= Eli Shamir =

Israeli mathematician and computer scientist (1934–2026)

- אלי שמיר
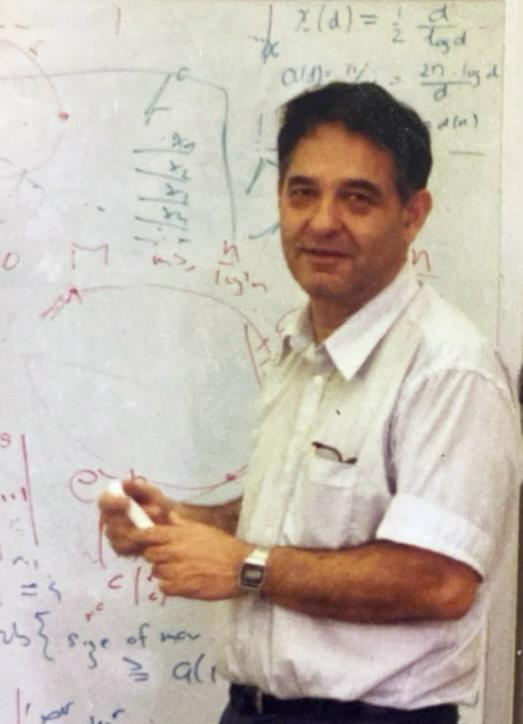
- Shamir in c. 1990
- Born: 1 July 1934
- Died: 5 March 2026 (aged 91)
- Education: Hebrew University
- Known for: Pumping lemma
- Scientific career
- Fields: Randomized and probabilistic algorithms, Communication networks, Natural language processing
- Thesis: Hilbert Transforms On a Half Line and Mixed Elliptic Boundary Problems in the Plane (1963)
- Doctoral advisor: Shmuel Agmon
- Doctoral students: Danny Dolev; Craig Gotsman; Joseph Naor; Marc Snir; Assaf Schuster; Eli Upfal

Eliahu "Eli" Shamir (Hebrew: אליהו (אלי) שמיר; 1 July 1934 – 5 March 2026) was an Israeli mathematician and computer scientist, the Jean and Helene Alfassa Professor Emeritus of Computer Science at the Hebrew University of Jerusalem.

== Life and career ==
Shamir was born in Jerusalem on 1 July 1934. He was the nephew of Yitzhaq Shami. During the 1948 Arab-Israeli War he volunteered to prepare defenses in Jerusalem. After studying at the Tachkemoni School and Hebrew University Secondary School, he studied mathematics at the Hebrew University of Jerusalem and served as the first operations research officer in the Israeli Air Force as part of the Atuda program. He earned a Ph.D. from the Hebrew University in 1963, under the supervision of Shmuel Agmon. After briefly holding faculty positions at the University of California, Berkeley and Northwestern University, he returned to the Hebrew University in 1966 and was promoted to full professor in 1972.

Shamir died on 5 March 2026, at the age of 91.

== Contributions ==
Shamir was one of the discoverers of the pumping lemma for context-free languages. He did research in partial differential equations, automata theory, random graphs, computational learning theory, and computational linguistics. He was (with Michael O. Rabin) one of the founders of the computer science program at the Hebrew University.

== Awards and honors ==
Shamir was given his named chair in 1987, and in 2002 a workshop on learning and formal verification was held in his honor at Neve Ilan, Israel.

== Selected publications ==
- Bar-Hillel, Y.; Perles, M.; Shamir, E. (1961), "On formal properties of simple phrase structure grammars", Zeitschrift für Phonetik, Sprachwissenschaft und Kommunikationsforschung, 14 (2): 143–172.
- Shamir, E.; Spencer, J. (1987), "Sharp concentration of the chromatic number on random graphs G_{n,p}", Combinatorica, 7 (1): 121–129, doi:10.1007/BF02579208, MR 0905159, S2CID 27769008.
- Freund, Yoav; Seung, H. Sebastian; Shamir, Eli; Tishby, Naftali (1997), "Selective sampling using the query by committee algorithm", Machine Learning, 28 (2–3): 133–168, Bibcode:1997MLear..28..133F, doi:10.1023/A:1007330508534.
