= Joseph Seffi Naor =

Israeli computer scientist

- יוסף ספי נאור
- Education: Hebrew University of Jerusalem; The Hebrew Reali School
- Scientific career
- Fields: Computer science
- Workplaces: Microsoft Research; Technion – Israel Institute of Technology; University of Southern California
- Doctoral advisor: Eli Shamir
- Doctoral students: Julia Chuzhoy
- Website: www.cs.technion.ac.il/~naor/

Joseph Seffi Naor (Hebrew: יוסף ספי נאור) is an Israeli professor of computer science and an author of over 200 peer-reviewed articles which were published in such journals as Journal of the ACM, IEEE Transactions on Pattern Analysis and Machine Intelligence and SIAM Journal on Computing among others.

== Biography ==
Naor was born in Haifa in 1957. and graduated from The Hebrew Reali Schoolin Haifa, in 1975. From 1981 to 1987 he was a teaching assistant at the Hebrew University of Jerusalem and from 1987 to 1988 was a post-doctoral fellow at University of Southern California in Los Angeles following by Stanford University with the same position until 1991. During 1983 and 1987 he received his Master's and Ph.D. degrees from Hebrew University in computer science. From 1998 to 2000 he was a Bell Labs' member of the technical staff at Lucent Technologies in Murray Hill, New Jersey, and from 2005 to 2007 worked at Microsoft Research in Redmond, Washington, as visiting researcher. Since 1991 he has worked as a professor at the Technion – Israel Institute of Technology as a computer scientist.
