= Julia Chuzhoy =

Israeli mathematician and computer scientist

- ג'וליה צ'וז'וי
- Education: Technion – Israel Institute of Technology (B.Sc., M.Sc., Ph.D.)
- Known for: Approximation algorithms, graph theory
- Awards: Best Paper Award at the Symposium on Foundations of Computer Science (2012)
- Scientific career
- Fields: Mathematics, Computer science
- Workplaces: Toyota Technological Institute at Chicago, University of Chicago
- Doctoral advisor: Seffi Naor

Julia Chuzhoy (Hebrew: ג'וליה צ'וז'וי) is an Israeli mathematician and computer scientist at the Toyota Technological Institute at Chicago, known for her research on approximation algorithms and graph theory.

== Education and career ==
Chuzhoy earned bachelor's, master's, and doctoral degrees from the Technion – Israel Institute of Technology in 1998, 2000, and 2004 respectively. Her dissertation, on approximation algorithms, was supervised by Seffi Naor. She has been at the Toyota Technological Institute since 2007, and also holds a position in the Computer Science Department of the University of Chicago.

== Contributions and recognition ==
Chuzhoy won the best paper award at the 2012 Symposium on Foundations of Computer Science for her paper with Shi Li on approximating the problem of connecting many given pairs of vertices in a graph by edge-disjoint paths.^{[CL12]} She is also known for her work showing a polynomial relation between the size of a grid graph minor of a graph and its treewidth.^{[CC16]} This connection between these two graph properties is a key component of the Robertson–Seymour theorem, is closely related to Halin's grid theorem for infinite graphs, and underlies the theory of bidimensionality for graph approximation algorithms.

She was an Invited Speaker at the 2014 International Congress of Mathematicians, in Seoul.

== Selected publications ==
| CL12. | Chuzhoy, Julia; Li, Shi (2012), "A polylogarithimic approximation algorithm for edge-disjoint paths with congestion 2", 2012 IEEE 53rd Annual Symposium on Foundations of Computer Science—FOCS 2012, IEEE Computer Soc., Los Alamitos, CA, pp. 233–242, MR 3186610. |

| CC16. | Chekuri, Chandra; Chuzhoy, Julia (2016), "Polynomial bounds for the grid-minor theorem", Journal of the ACM, 63 (5): A40:1–65, arXiv:1305.6577, doi:10.1145/2820609, MR 3593966, S2CID 209860422. Preliminary versions of this work were presented at the 2014 and 2015 Symposia on Theory of Computing. |
