= Assaf Schuster =

Israeli professor of computer science

- אסף שוסטר
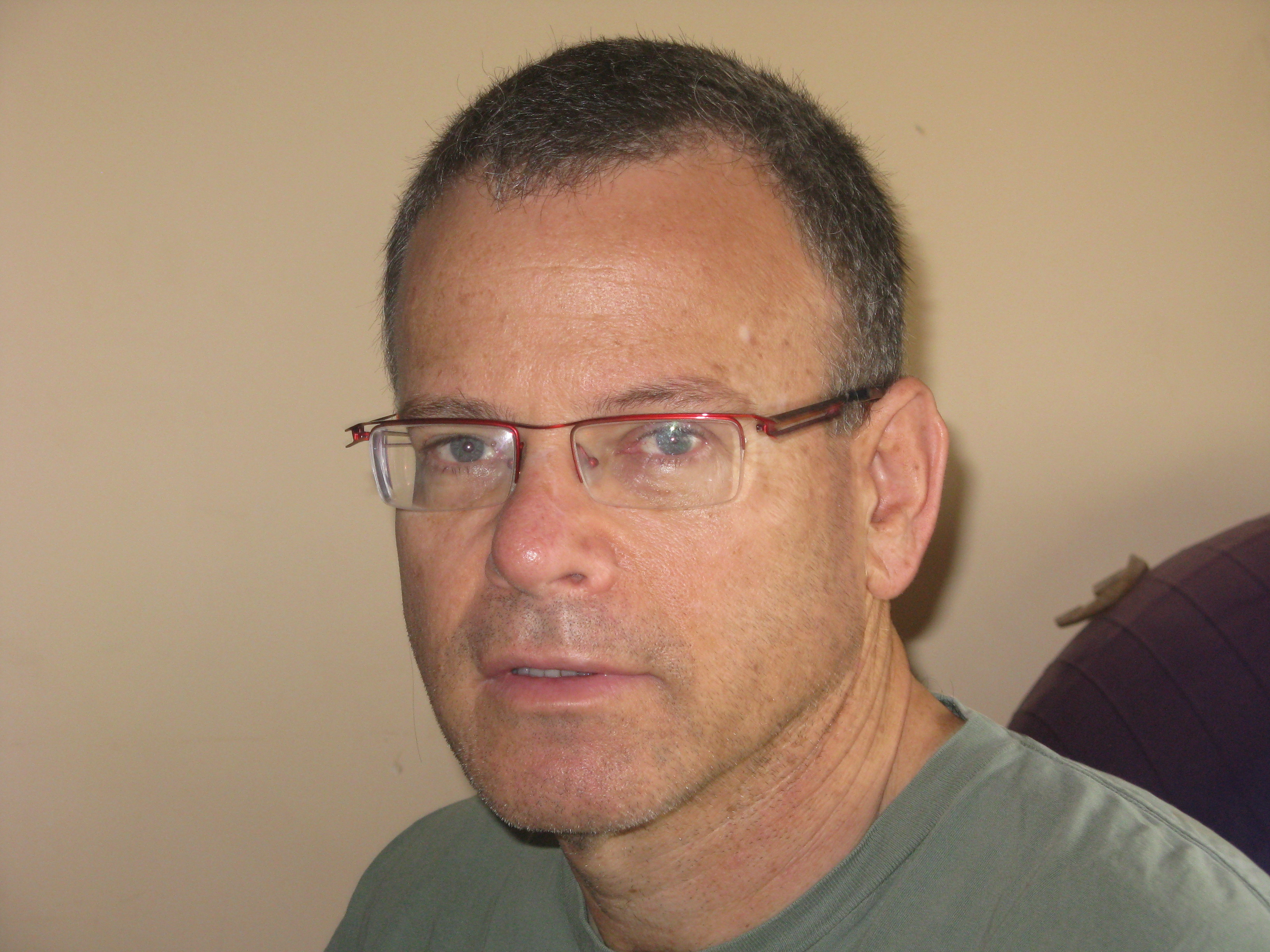
- Born: 1958 (age 67–68); Givat Brenner, Israel
- Education: Hebrew University of Jerusalem
- Known for: Cloud computing, dynamic configuration of communication networks
- Awards: Fellow of the Association for Computing Machinery (2015)
- Scientific career
- Fields: Computer Science
- Workplaces: Technion – Israel Institute of Technology
- Doctoral advisor: Eli Shamir

Assaf Schuster (Hebrew: אסף שוסטר) is an Israeli entrepreneur and professor of computer science whose works have been published in such journals as Computer Aided Verification and Journal of Systems and Software.

== Biography ==
Schuster was born in 1958 in the Israeli kibbutz Givat Brenner to Tzipora and Yochanan Schuster. His family is of Ashkenazi-Jewish origin.

Schuster began his academic studies at the Hebrew University in 1981, and graduated in 1984, with a bachelor's degree in mathematics and computer science. In 1986, he graduated with a master's degree in computer science. After receiving his degree, Schuster worked as a teacher at Ort College in Givat Ram, Jerusalem. In 1991, Schuster received a doctorate from the Hebrew University of Jerusalem in computer science. His PhD topic dealt with the dynamic configuration of communication networks for parallel computation, under the guidance of Eli Shamir. He then started working at Technion - Israel Institute of Technology. In 2000, he became an associate professor and in 2007, he became a professor.

In 2015 he was named a Fellow of the Association for Computing Machinery for his contributions to cloud computing.

In 2016, Schuster co-founded a startup called Cy-oT (Cyber of Things), along with Natan Bandler and Daniel Moscovici. Schuster served as the CTO until the company was sold to Verint in 2019.
