= Arie Kutz =

Israeli architect and urban planner

- אריה קוץ
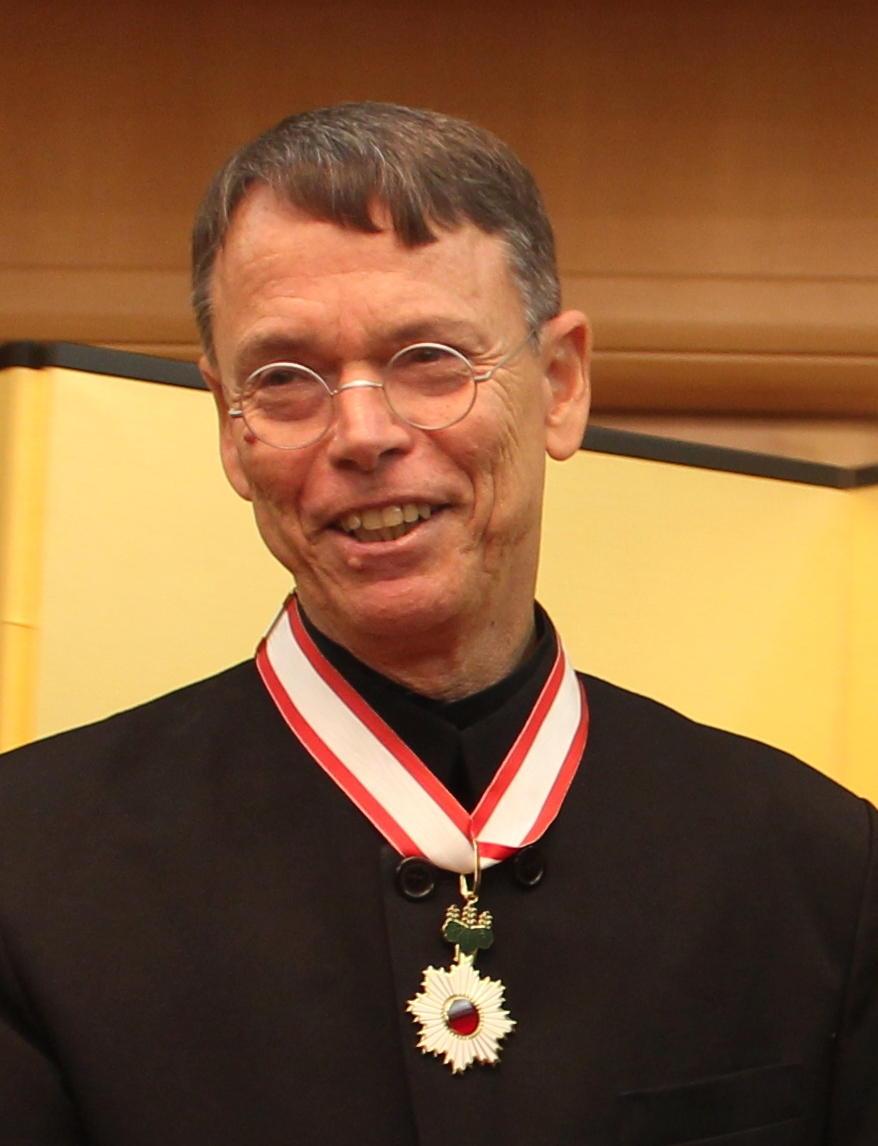
- Born: 9 March 1953 (age 73)
- Education: Technion – Israel Institute of Technology (B.Sc.); Tokyo Institute of Technology (M.Sc.)
- Occupations: Architect, urban planner
- Awards: Order of the Rising Sun (2016)

Arie Kutz (אריה קוץ; born 9 March 1953) is an Israeli architect and urban planner, specializing in urban planning and landscape design. He serves as chairman of the Israel–Japan Friendship Association.

In 2016, Kutz was awarded the Order of the Rising Sun by the Government of Japan for his contribution to the development of cultural and professional ties between Japan and Israel.

In the same year, the professional journal Binian Diur included Kutz among the 30 pioneers of Israeli architecture, and listed the architectural firm of which he is a co-owner among the 100 most influential architectural practices of the past decade.

== Early life and education ==
Kutz received his secondary education at the municipal Ohel Shem High School in Ramat Gan. After completing military service, he enrolled at the Technion – Israel Institute of Technology, where he earned a Bachelor of Science degree in architecture in 1979.

From 1981 to 1984, Kutz studied in Japan on a scholarship from the Japanese Ministry of Education, attending the Tokyo Institute of Technology. He obtained a Master of Science degree, specializing in the history of Japanese architecture, conservation of historic urban fabric, and urban restoration.

His master's thesis focused on the architectural concept of the "approach" as a spatio-temporal element of the traditional Japanese house, examined within the context of the interaction between architecture and time.

== Professional career ==
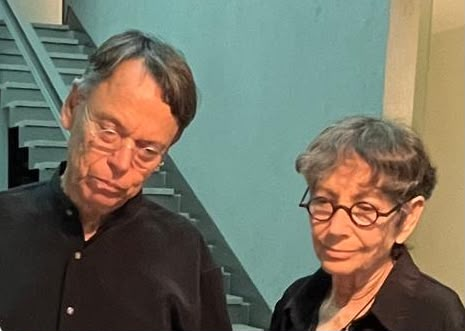
Architect Arie Kutz with his wife, Roni Nir

Kutz worked at the architectural firm Yaski–Gil–Sivan during two periods (1975–1981 and 1984–1988), participating in the design of residential, public, and commercial projects. One of his final projects at the firm was the HaSharon Mall in Netanya, which he worked on from the conceptual planning stage through completion.

In 1988, together with architect Roni Nir, he co-founded Nir–Kutz Architects Ltd. The firm operates in the fields of architectural design, urban planning, and landscape architecture, and is regularly featured in professional architectural publications.

From 1991 to 1997, Kutz was a member of the Central Planning Team of the Tel Aviv municipality, focusing on strategic urban development.

After leaving the municipality, he founded Planners’ Cell Ltd., a company specializing in urban planning. In 1999, he also co-established a landscape architecture studio together with Paul Friedberg and Dorit Shahar.

In 2003, Kutz was appointed head of the team responsible for the program of renewal and densification of central Jerusalem. In this role, he participated in the preparation of the master plan for the Mea Shearim neighborhood and other urban renewal projects.

== Selected projects ==
In 2013, Kutz developed a high-rise residential redevelopment project on the site of former Israel Defense Forces bases in Ramat Gan, proposing residential towers of up to 47 floors alongside a large urban park.

In 2011, Kutz won a competition for the design of a new wing of the Check Point campus. The project was completed in 2018 and attracted professional attention for its extensive use of green façades.

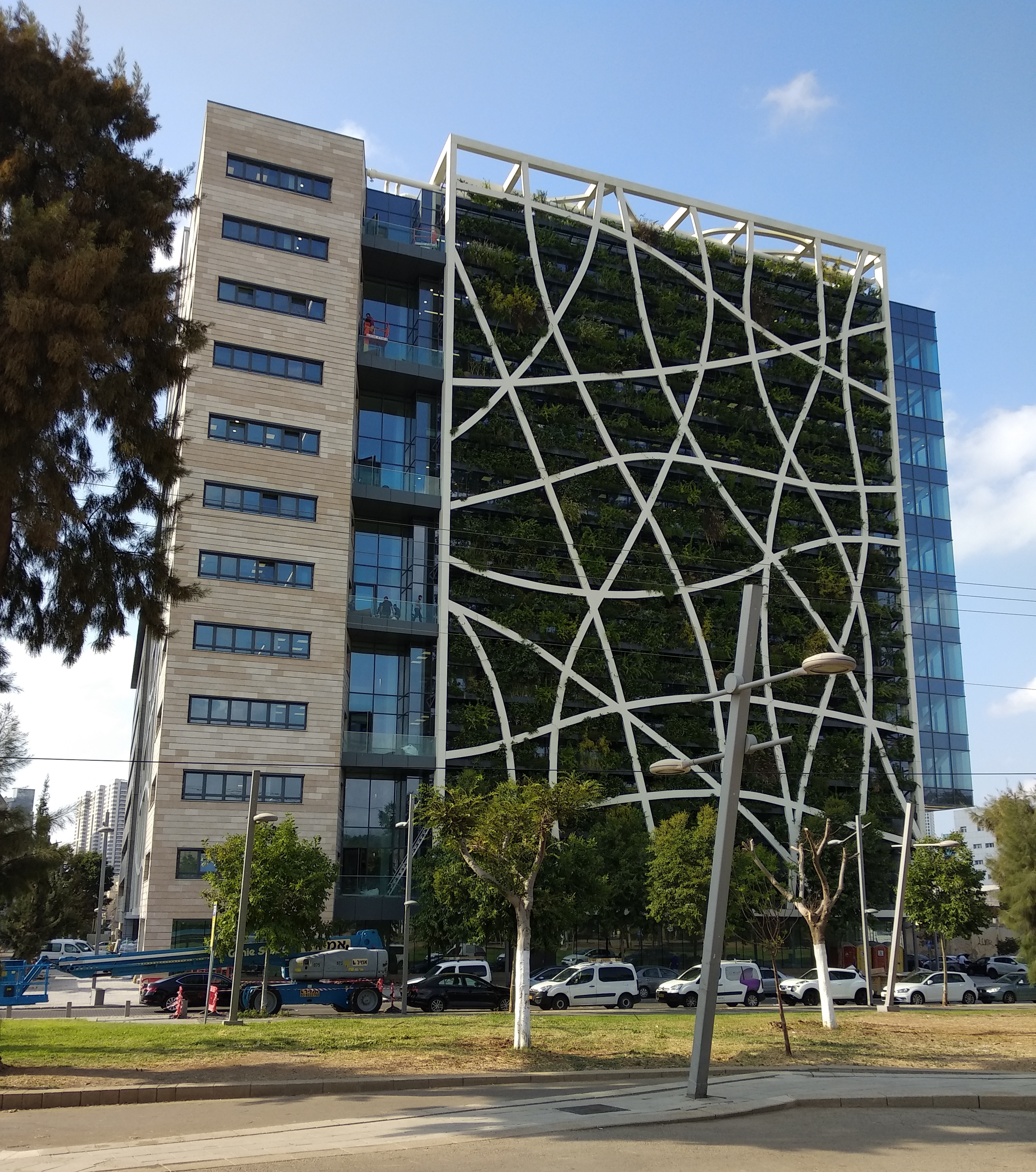
New wing of Check Point headquarters, Tel Aviv

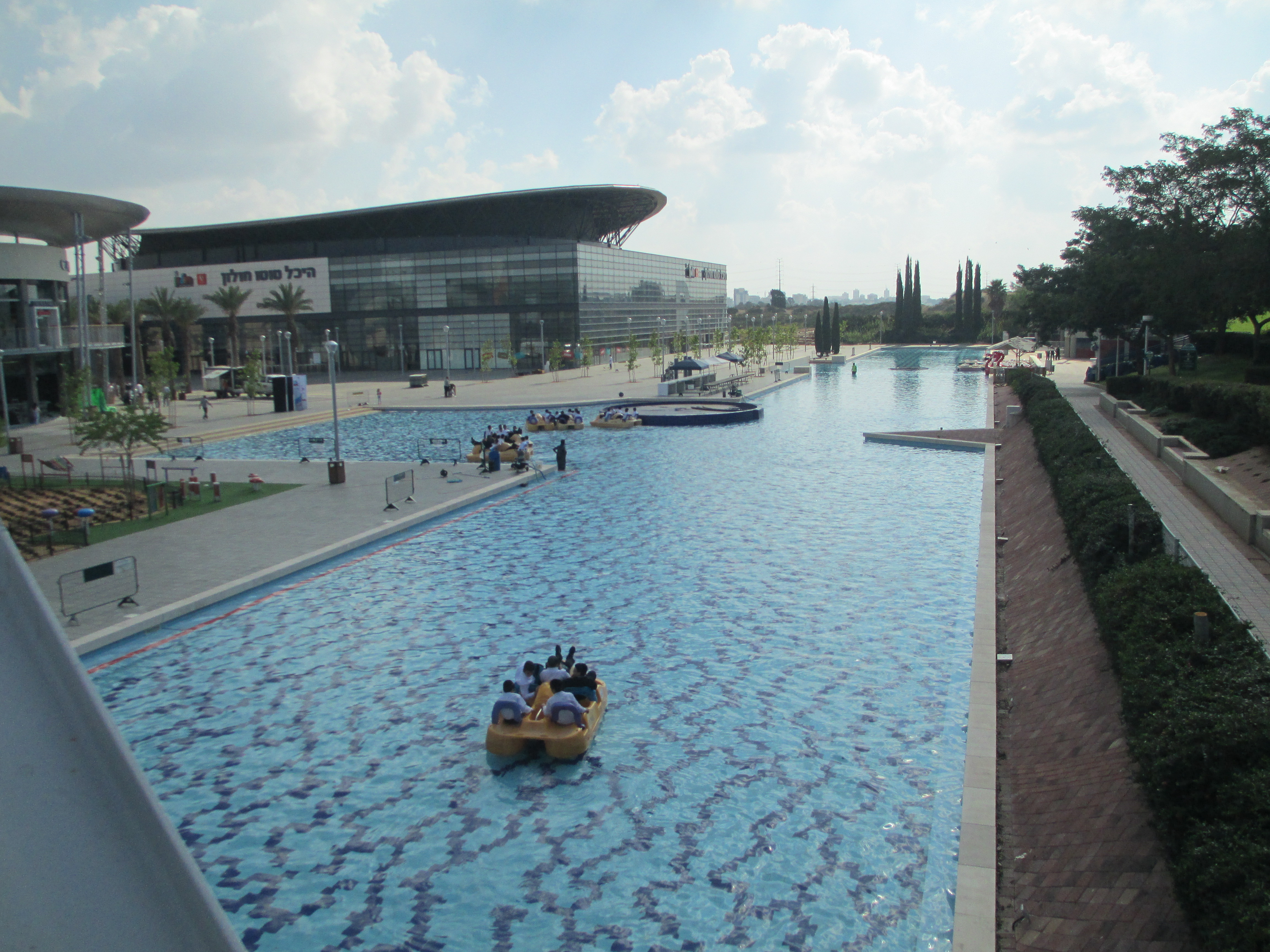
Peres Park, Holon

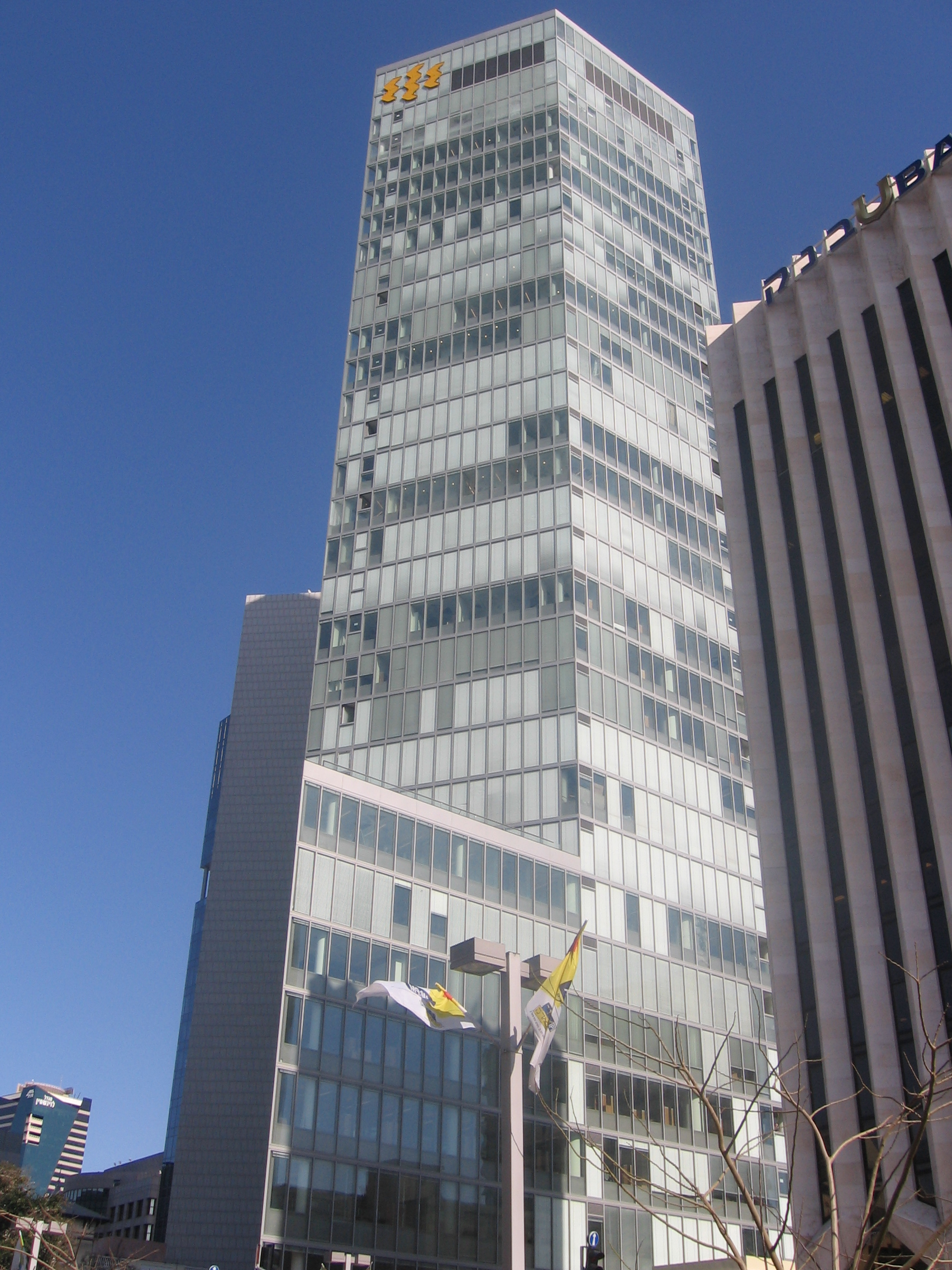
First International Bank building, Tel Aviv

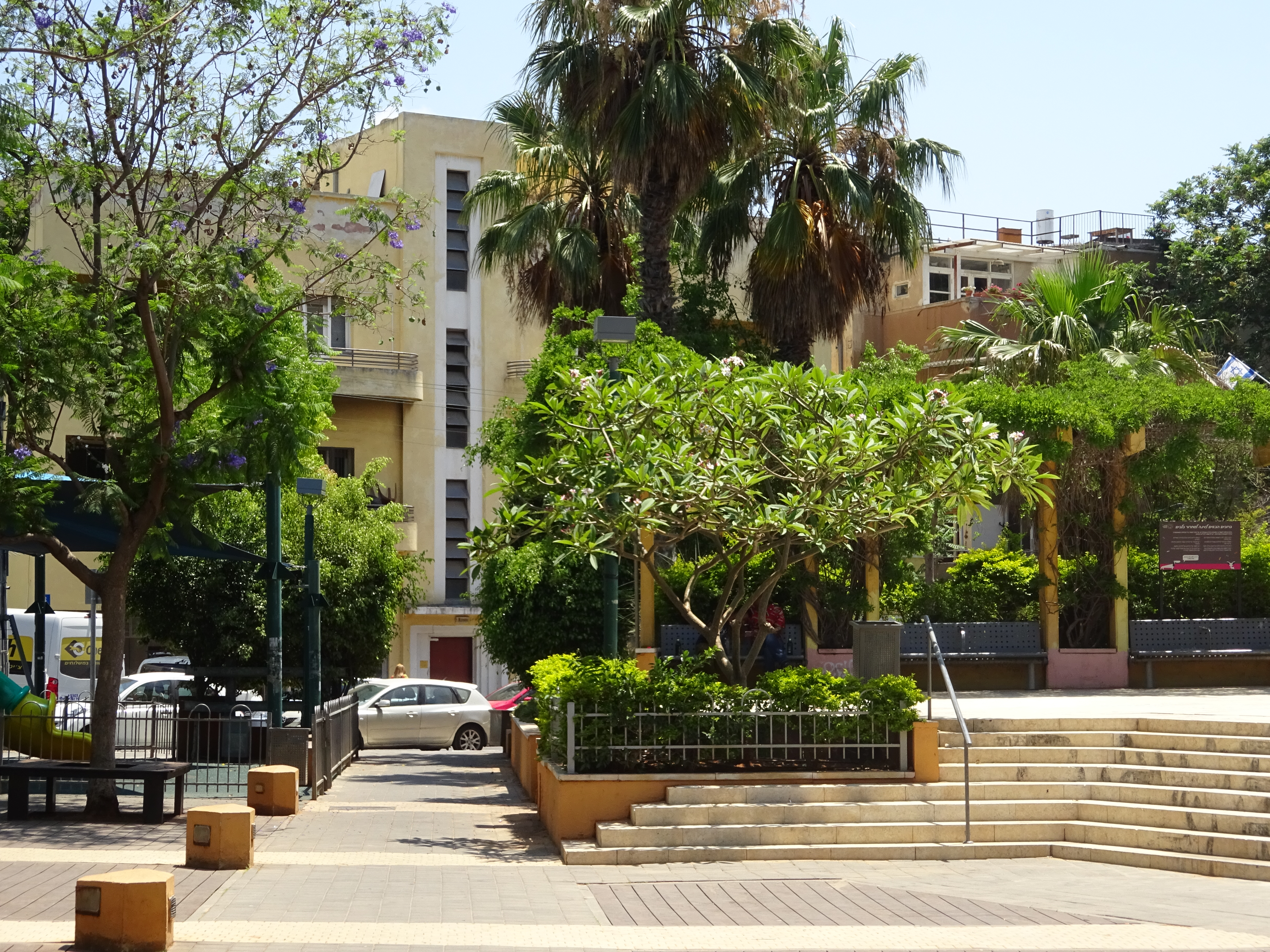
HaSharon Garden (Gan HaHashmal), Tel Aviv

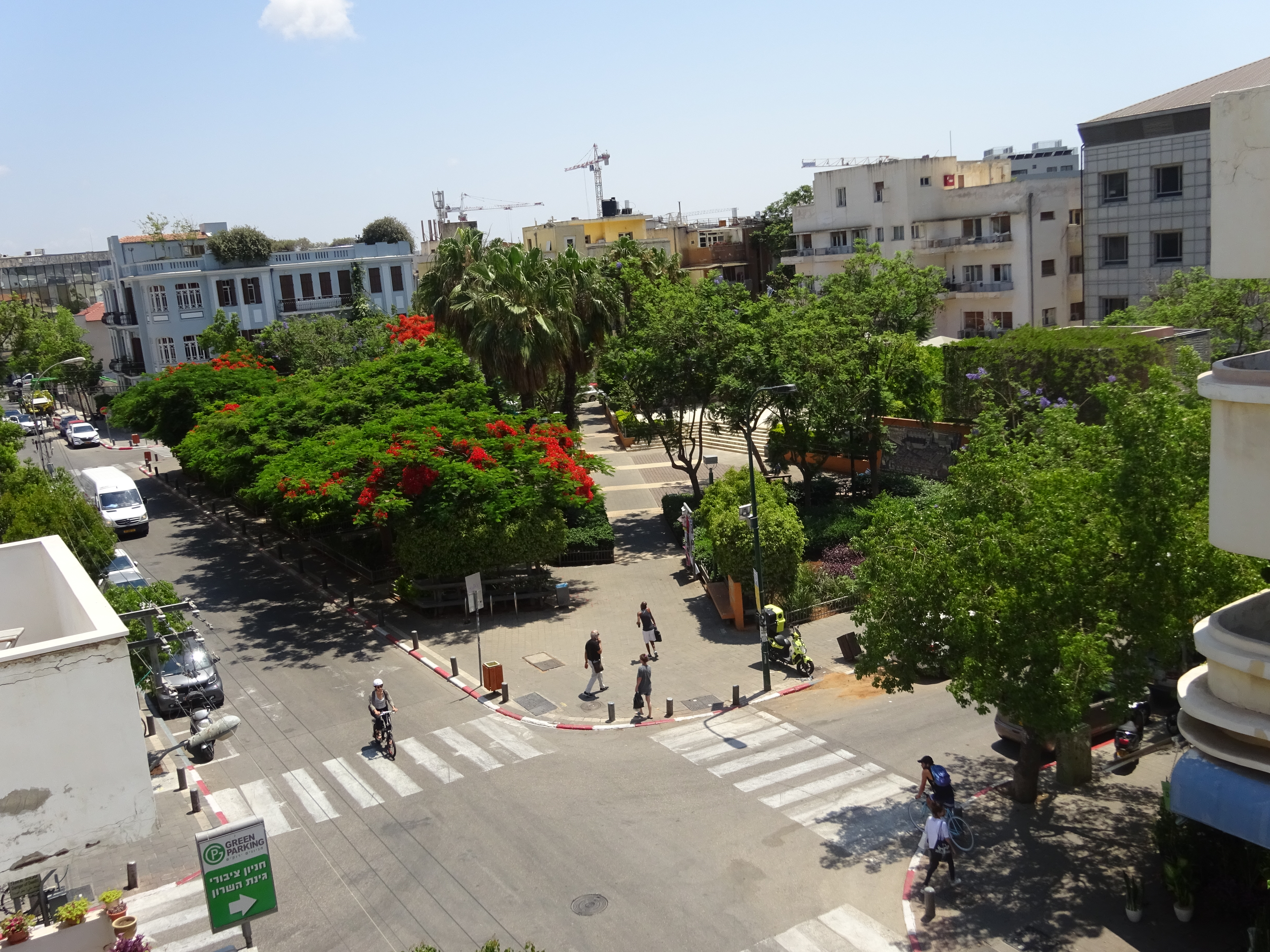
HaSharon Garden, aerial view

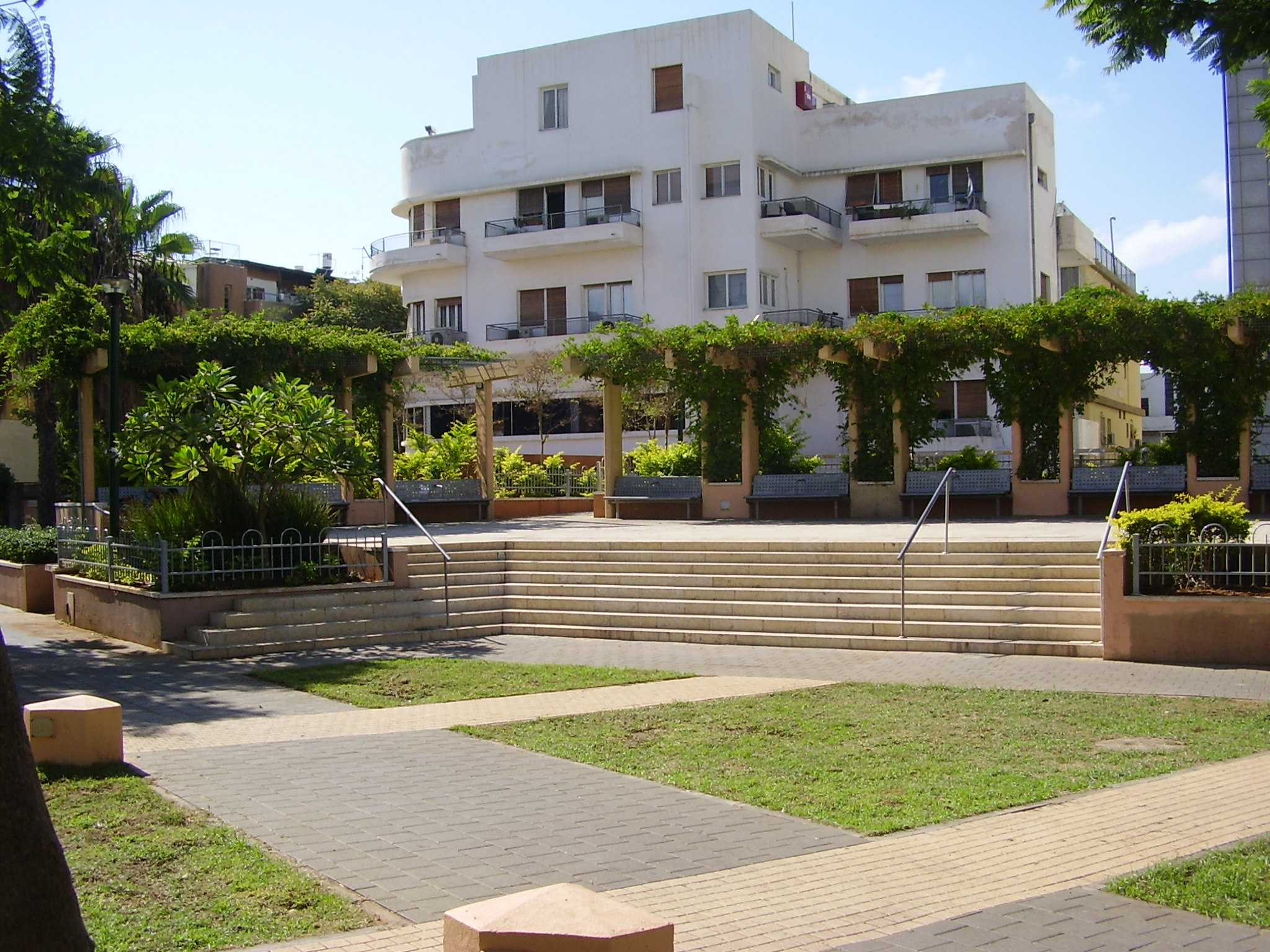
HaSharon Garden, Tel Aviv

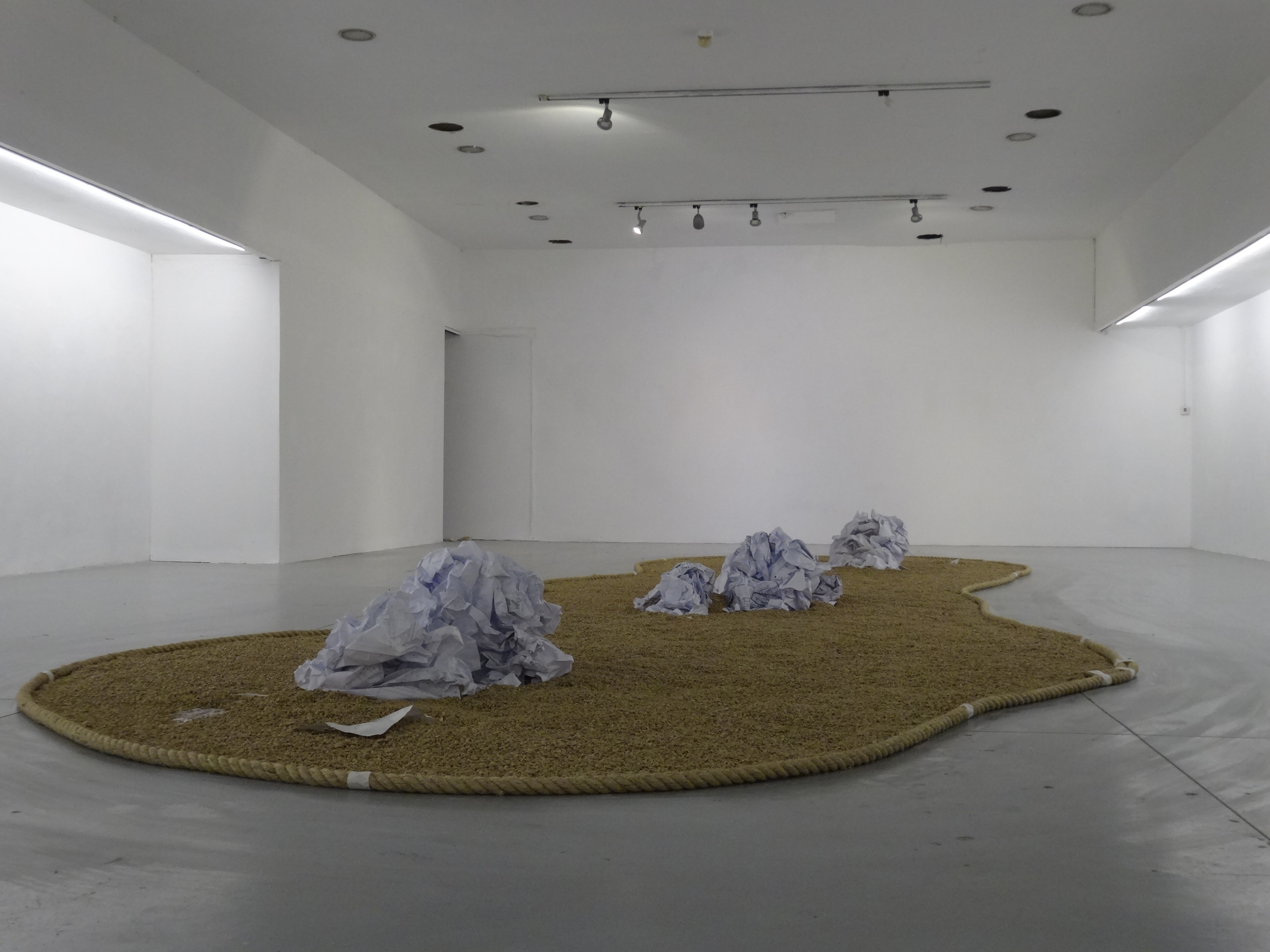
“Paper Bridge”, Tsaritsky Artists’ House

== Academic and public activity ==
Kutz teaches at the Department of East Asian Studies of Tel Aviv University.

He also regularly leads professional architectural study tours in Japan, focusing on Japanese architecture and culture, introducing Israeli architects to Japanese architectural traditions.

== Architectural style ==
The work of Arie Kutz is characterized by the influence of Japanese architectural aesthetics, attention to the relationship between architecture and landscape, and the use of diagonal compositional solutions. He consistently combines elements of historic urban fabric with contemporary architectural forms, as noted in professional literature.
