= Eli Upfal =

Israeli computer scientist

- אלי אבפל
- Education: Hebrew University
- Awards: IEEE Fellow (2002), ACM Fellow (2005), Paris Kanellakis Award (2020)
- Scientific career
- Fields: Computer Science
- Workplaces: Brown University
- Doctoral advisor: Eli Shamir

Eli Upfal (Hebrew: אלי אבפל) is a computer science researcher, currently the Rush C. Hawkins Professor of Computer Science at Brown University. He completed his undergraduate studies in mathematics and statistics at the Hebrew University of Jerusalem in 1978, received an M.Sc. in computer science from the Feinberg Graduate School of the Weizmann Institute of Science, Israel in 1980, and completed his PhD in computer science at the Hebrew University in 1983 under Eli Shamir. He has made contributions in a variety of areas. Most of his work involves randomized and/or online algorithms, stochastic processes, or the probabilistic analysis of deterministic algorithms. Particular applications include routing and communications networks, computational biology, and computational finance.

He is responsible for a large body of work, including, as of May 2012, more than 150 publications in journals and conferences as well as many patents. He has won several prizes, including the IBM Outstanding Innovation Award and the Levinson Prize in Mathematical Sciences. In 2002, Eli Upfal, was inducted as a Fellow of the Institute of Electrical and Electronics Engineers, and in 2005 he was inducted as a Fellow of the Association for Computing Machinery. He received, together with Yossi Azar, Andrei Broder, Anna Karlin, and Michael Mitzenmacher, the 2020 ACM Paris Kanellakis Award.

Eli is a coauthor of the book Mitzenmacher, Michael; Upfal, Eli (2005-01-31). Probability and Computing: Randomized Algorithms and Probabilistic Analysis. Cambridge University Press. ISBN 978-0-521-83540-4.
