= Technion International School =

- The emblem of the Technion
- Type: International program within a public university
- Established: 2009
- Undergraduates: 200
- Location: Haifa, Israel; 32°46′39″N 35°01′18″E
- Website: Technion International

Technion International (TI) is the international department of Technion-Israel Institute of Technology, which was ranked as the best university in Israel and the Middle East. Located in Haifa, Israel, Technion International was founded in 2009 in order to oversee Technion’s international academic endeavors. Technion International offers a variety of programs, including "full undergraduate and graduate programs, postdoctoral fellowships, study abroad programs, summer programs for gifted teens, research internships as well as entrepreneurship programs". As of 2018, "Technion has academic collaboration agreements with 232 universities in 41 countries and 36 medical school agreements".

Technion International has two international affiliates: the Jacobs Technion-Cornell Institute, with partnership with Cornell University, and the Guangdong Technion Israel Institute of Technology, located in Shantou, Guangdong Province, China. It is the first Israeli university to establish joint campuses oversees.

== Bachelors' Degree ==
Technion International offers two 4-year undergraduate degrees in English.

=== Civil Engineering ===
With the core themes of Construction Management and Water Resources Engineering, Civil Engineering at Technion International focuses on “…construction management at different stages of the construction process, such as management, economic, business, planning and legal issues associated with this process. Students also study topics related to the design and management of water delivery and supply systems, water and wastewater treatment and recycling, as well as the development of new water sources".

=== Mechanical Engineering ===
With core themes of Robotics Control and Dynamic Systems, Mechanical engineering at Technion International is based on “…materials, fluid and thermal sciences and offers areas of specialization in robotics, control, and dynamical systems. Students also gain practical skills and knowledge of robotics, computer aided design and simulation. Coursework will be combined with project-based laboratory and design assignments at the faculty’s advanced laboratories, to help students develop independence, creative talent, and leadership experience".

== Exchange Programs ==
Technion International is part of the Erasmus+ initiative. It is also a member of CLUSTER (Consortium of Leading Universities of Science and Technology), Global-E3 (Global Engineering Educational Exchange), CMU (Community of Mediterranean Universities) and IAU (International Association of Universities). Semester Abroad is geared towards university students from all over the world who wish to study at Technion International for a semester. Classes are offered in the faculties of Civil Engineering, Environmental Engineering, Aerospace Engineering, Chemical Engineering, Biology, Biotechnology Engineering, Electrical Engineering, Materials Engineering, Mechanical Engineering and Pre-medical. Students choose between a Winter and a Spring semester.

== Jacobs Technion-Cornell Institute ==
Located in Roosevelt Island, New York, the partnership between Technion-Institute of Technology and Cornell University was created with the mission “…to transform key industries through technological innovation, deep-tech startups, and uniquely skilled talent". Founded in 2012, Jacobs Institute offers a variety of master’s programs in the applied sciences. The Institute has three major "hubs" for its technological and industrial focuses: Connective Media, Health Tech, and Urban Tech. It also offers Masters' in Electric and Computer Engineering, Computer Science, Tech MBA, Engineering in Operations Research and Information Engineering, Master of Laws (LLM) in Law, Technology, and Entrepreneurship.

== Guangdong Technion Israel Institute of Technology (GTIIT) ==
Founded in 2015, GTIIT is in the city of Shantou, Guangdong province and is a partnership between Technion-Institute of Technology and Shantou University. The Institute offers undergraduate degrees in Chemical Engineering, in Biotechnology and Food Engineering, and in Materials Engineering, as well as Graduate and research programs. All of the programs are taught in English. Professor Aaron Ciechanover, Nobel Laureate, is the acting Vice Chancellor of GTIIT.

== Summer Programs ==
Technion International also offers specialized summer courses for college students.

=== Summer in Entrepreneurship with Professional Internship ===
This program was created for students with an interest in entrepreneurship and innovation. Students spend the first part of the summer doing an internship in one of Israel’s many high-tech companies. This is followed by courses on Entrepreneurship. Both the courses and the internship are worth Technion academic credit. The program also includes trips around the country.

=== Summer School of Engineering and Science ===
This program is open to third and fourth-year undergraduate students, graduate students, and recent graduates. This four-week program has students choose from a variety of departments, including Architecture, Chemistry, Electrical Engineering, etc, taught by Technion faculty. It also includes trips around the country. Students receive 4-5 Technion credits for this program.
