= Maytal Caspary Toroker =

- מיטל כספרי–טורוקר
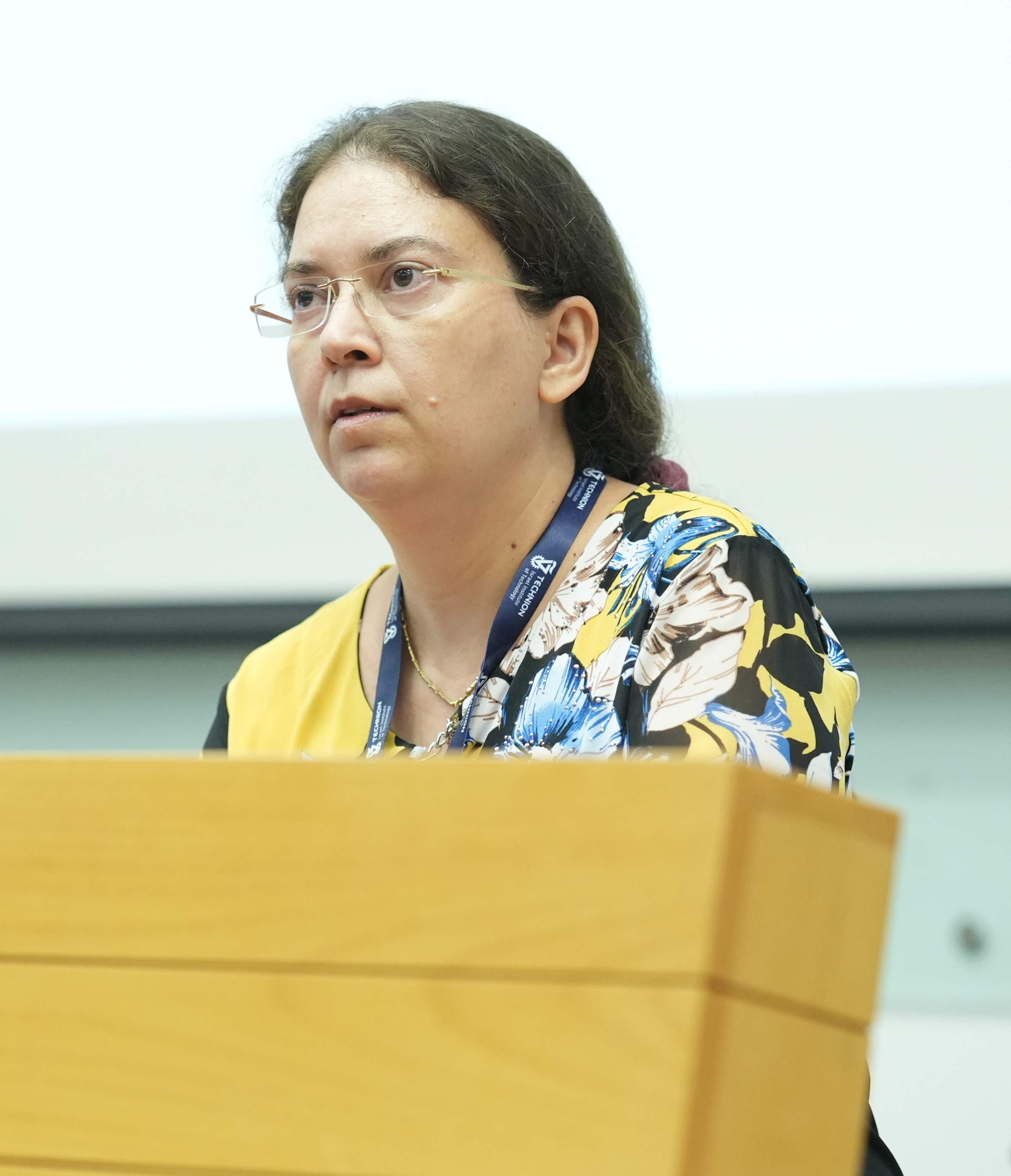
- Maytal Caspary Toroker at the Nanocrystal Conference (2023), Technion
- Born: Israel
- Citizenship: Israel
- Education: Technion-Israel Institute of Technology
- Occupation: Professor
- Known for: Studies on catalysis, charge transport through materials
- Scientific career
- Fields: Computational Materials Science, Density functional Theory, Catalysis
- Workplaces: Technion-Israel Institute of Technology, Princeton University
- Thesis: New rate expressions: formulation and applications to electron transfer processes (2009)
- Doctoral advisor: Uri Peskin
- Website: https://computationalmaterials.net.technion.ac.il/

Maytal Caspary Toroker (Hebrew: מיטל כספרי–טורוקר) is a professor in the Department of Materials Science and Engineering at Technion-Israel Institute of Technology, Haifa, Israel. She is recognized for her significant contributions in the field of computational materials science, particularly in its applications to catalysis, charge transport, and energy conversion devices.

== Early life and education ==
Maytal was born in Israel. She completed her BA degree in molecular biochemistry (2004) from the Department of Chemistry at Technion. Later, she pursued her direct Ph.D. (2009) from the same department.

== Research and career ==
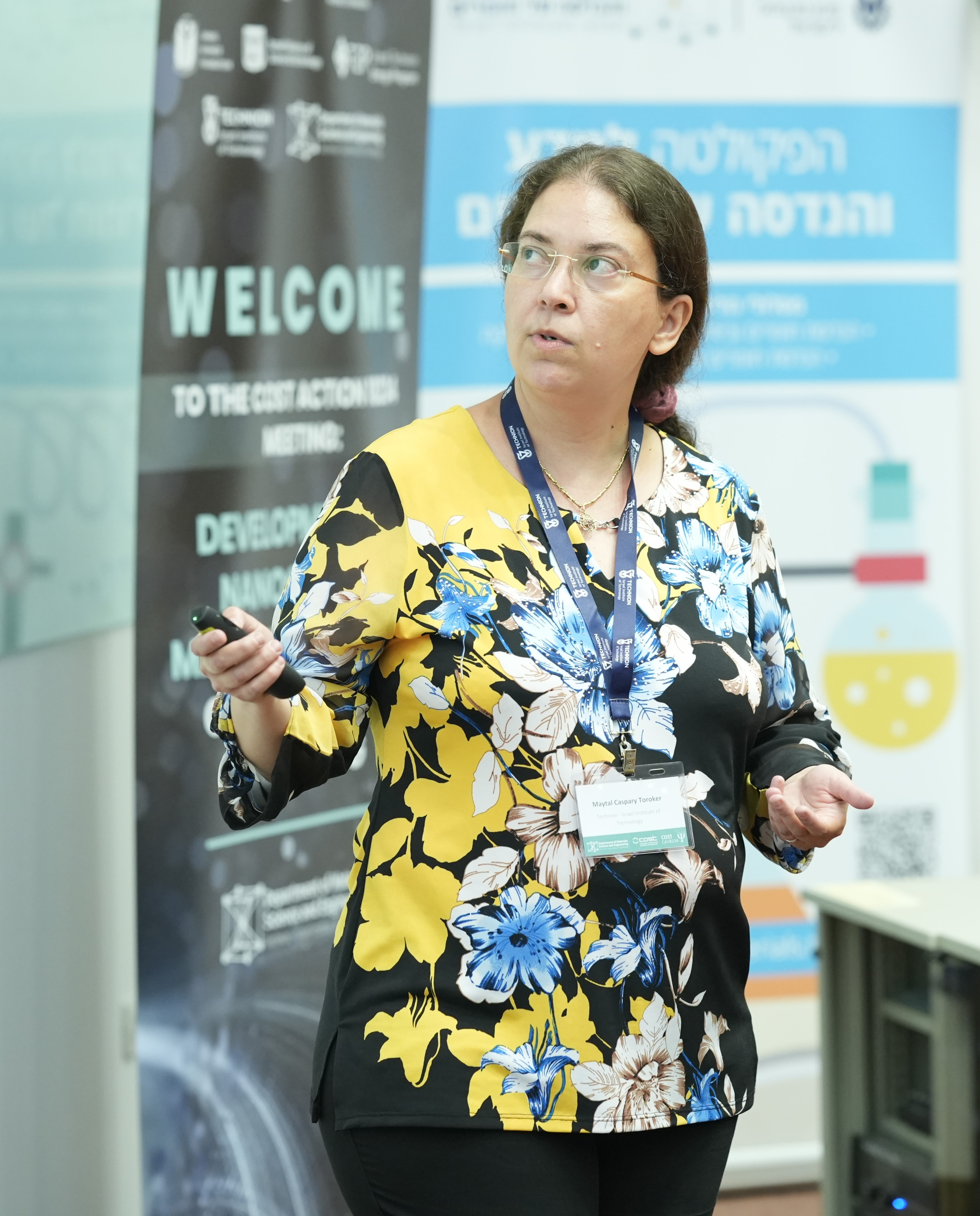
Prof. Maytal Caspary Toroker at Technion-Israel Institute of Technology, Haifa (2023)

After receiving her Ph.D., she started working with Prof. Emily A. Carter at Princeton University during the period of 2010–13, funded by the Marie Curie International Outgoing Fellowship from the European Union. In 2013, she joined the Department of Materials Science and Engineering at Technion-Israel Institute of Technology, Haifa, as an assistant professor, and she is currently working as a professor.

Her research at Technion mainly involves development of density functional theory (DFT) and its application. She has extensively worked on developing a method for charge transport calculation through heterostructures using wave propagation method. Her research on doped NiOOH (Nickel oxy-hydroxide) has explained the reason for the material's remarkable success in the oxygen evolution reaction. Her results show that it is the iron's ability to change its oxidation state that facilitates oxygen evolution. This work was published in the journal Physical Chemistry Chemical Physics and was featured on the front cover of Issue 11, 2017. She has also conducted research on transition metal oxides for their applications as photocatalysts and photoelectrodes. She developed a method to calculate the band edge positions using first principles quantum mechanics calculations. These band edge positions play a crucial role in determining the suitability of these materials for various applications. Apart from this, she also works on metal organic frameworks (MOFs) and covalent organic frameworks (COFs) for their application in photocatalysis and electrocatalysis.

Currently she is the chair of European Cooperation in Science and Technology (COST) action on Computational materials sciences for efficient water splitting with nanocrystals from abundant elements. She is in the editorial advisory board of the journal Advanced Theory and Simulation, Wiley

== Awards and honours ==
- Alexander Goldberg Research Prize (2021)
- L'Oréal-Unesco-Israel Award (2010)
- New England Fund (2009)
