= Craig Gotsman =

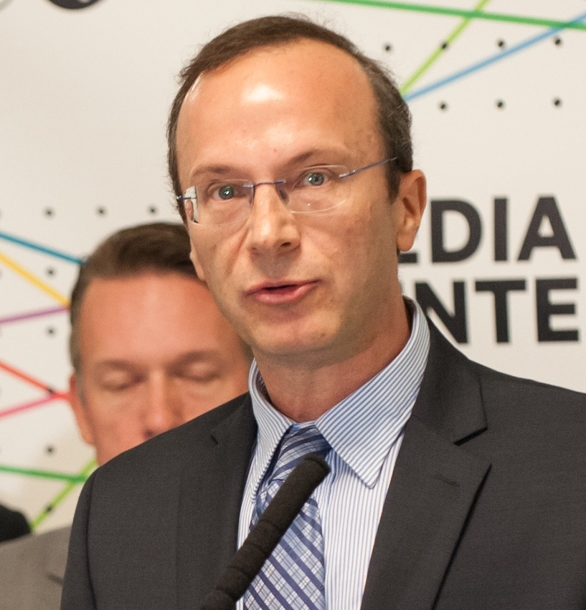
- Gotsman in 2013
- Born: Birmingham, UK
- Education: Hebrew University of Jerusalem
- Known for: Co-founder of Cornell Tech (NYC), tech entrepreneur
- Awards: Fellow, Association for Computing Machinery (ACM); Fellow, National Academy of Inventors (NAI); Fellow, Academy of Europe (AE); Fellow, Academy of Science, Engineering and Medicine of Florida (ASEMFL).
- Scientific career
- Fields: Computer Science
- Workplaces: New Jersey Institute of Technology; Cornell Tech; Technion - Israel Institute of Technology

Craig Gotsman is a Distinguished Professor of Computer Science at New Jersey Institute of Technology (NJIT). He was previously Dean of the Ying Wu College of Computing at NJIT between 2017-2023. Prior, he was one of the founders of the Cornell Tech campus in New York City and the founding director of the joint Jacobs Technion-Cornell Innovation Institute there. During 2024, he was Professor of Electrical and Computer Engineering at the University of Miami.

== Early life ==
Born in the UK, Gotsman spent his early childhood in South Africa. His family immigrated to Israel in 1973. He was awarded all his academic degrees, including a PhD in Computer Science in 1991, from the Hebrew University of Jerusalem. During 1984–89, Gotsman served as an officer in the Technological R&D Unit of the Israel Defense Forces, retiring from active reserve duty in 2005 with the rank of major.

== Academic career ==
Specializing in computer graphics and geometry processing, Gotsman joined the Computer Science Department at the Technion – Israel Institute of Technology in Haifa as an assistant professor in 1991. In 2005 he co-founded the Center for Graphics and Geometric Computing, and in 2006 he became the first incumbent of the Technion's Hewlett-Packard Chair in Computer Engineering.

Gotsman was visiting professor at Harvard University and research scientist at MIT during 2003–2004, visiting professor at INRIA, Sophia Antipolis in 2006 and visiting professor at ETH Zurich in 2010. He was appointed founding director of the joint Jacobs Technion-Cornell Innovation Institute at Cornell Tech. and served on the faculty there between 2012 and 2016.

Gotsman has published over 150 research papers and holds 13 US patents.

Gotsman is an ACM Fellow, a Fellow of the National Academy of Inventors, a Fellow of the Academy of Europe (Academia Europaea) and a Fellow of the Academy of Science, Engineering and Medicine of Florida.

=== Cornell Tech ===
Gotsman was a member of the leading team in the formation of the Cornell Tech campus in New York City. Cornell Tech is an applied sciences campus dedicated to fostering innovation and producing entrepreneurial engineers, a project conceived and driven by former Mayor Michael Bloomberg and the New York City Economic Development Corporation, with the purpose of growing the tech sector of NYC.

In 2011, Gotsman helped prepare the proposal to establish an Applied Sciences campus, submitted by Cornell University and Technion to the City of New York. The proposal subsequently won the bid, competing against a number of groups of international universities, including Massachusetts Institute of Technology and Stanford University. Technion was cited as "the MIT of Israel" and a key player because of its innovation culture and contribution to the emergence of Israel as a global technological superpower, as documented in the book "Startup Nation".

In 2011, Gotsman was appointed Deputy Senior Vice-President (equivalent to Vice Provost) at Technion, responsible for the joint Technion-Cornell venture. In Feb 2012 he was appointed Founding Director of the joint Jacobs Technion-Cornell Innovation Institute at Cornell Tech. In this role, Gotsman developed a number of novel academic and entrepreneurial programs, including the successful Runway program, supporting PhDs forming commercial ventures based on their deep technical expertise. He also engaged in faculty and student recruiting, corporate relations, media relations and fund raising.

=== New Jersey Institute of Technology ===
In 2017, Gotsman was named Distinguished Professor and Dean of the Ying Wu College of Computing at New Jersey Institute of Technology (NJIT). At NJIT, he worked with inter-disciplinary faculty members and the university leadership in expanding the college with a new department of Data Science, and the Institute for Data Science, and the new NJIT satellite facility in Jersey City. He was a member of the NJIT team that established the joint Institute for Future Technologies with Ben-Gurion University of Israel.

== Entrepreneurship ==
Gotsman co-founded three startup companies: Virtue3D was founded in 1997 and developed advanced technologies for Web-based 3D computer graphics based on Technion intellectual property. The technology was eventually acquired by German Mental Images. Estimotion – a precursor to Waze – was founded in 2000 and developed technologies for real-time traffic-based applications for cellular phones. The principal investors were Partner/Orange Communications and Shlomo Group. Estimotion was acquired by British ITIS Holdings. CatchEye/Perceptiko – commercializing 3D camera-related video-processing technology that Gotsman developed with colleagues at ETH Zurich – was founded in 2014 and acquired in 2017.

Gotsman also co-founded in 2006 an active consulting company – Geometrika – which develops graphics and geometric software technologies.

== Other Activities ==
=== Outreach ===
While at Technion, Gotsman served as Associate Dean for Computing during 2001–2003. He also founded its Industrial Affiliates Program and Alumni Program and served as Associate Dean for External Relations during 2005–2008.

=== Industrial Activity ===
Gotsman served as consultant for HP Labs in Haifa and spent summers during 1993–1996 at HP Labs in Palo Alto. He has also consulted for companies in Israel, Europe and the US, including Nokia, Shell Oil, Disney, Intel, Rafael, Autodesk and Samsung.

=== Public Service ===
In 2014, Gotsman served as a technology expert on the New York City Metropolitan Transportation Authority Reinvention Commission, appointed by the governor of NY State. In its report, the commission recommended a number of reforms to the public transportation systems in New York City. Gotsman is also active in the entrepreneurial community in New York and New Jersey, in particular through the New York City Economic Development Corporation. and the New Jersey Economic Development Authority.

== Select Bibliography ==
- Chen, R. and Gotsman, C. "Generalized As-Similar-As-Possible Warping with Applications in Digital Photography", Computer Graphics Forum, 35(2):81-92, 2016.
- Kuster C., Popa T., Bazin J.-C., Gotsman C. and Gross M. "Gaze Correction for Home Video Conferencing", ACM Transactions on Graphics (Proc. SIGGRAPH Asia), 31(6):174, 2012.
- Xu Y., Liu L., Gotsman C. and Gortler S.J. "Capacity-Constrained Delaunay Triangulation for Point Distributions", Computers and Graphics (Proc. SMI), 35(3):510–516, 2011.
- Ben-Chen M., Weber O. and Gotsman C. "Variational Harmonic Maps for Space Deformation", ACM Transactions on Graphics 28(3), (Proc. SIGGRAPH), 2009.
- Weber O., Ben-Chen M. and Gotsman C. "Complex Barycentric Coordinates with Applications to Image Deformation", Computer Graphics Forum, 28(2):587–597, 2009.
- Liu L., Zhang L., Xu Y., Gotsman C. and Gortler S.J. "A Local/Global Approach to Mesh Parameterization", Computer Graphics Forum, 27(5):1495–1504, (Proc. Symp. Geometry Proc.), 2008.
- Gortler S.J., Gotsman C. and Thurston D. "Discrete One-forms on Meshes and Applications to 3D Mesh Parameterization", Computer Aided Geometric Design, 33(2):83–112, 2006.
- Sumner R.W., Zwicker M., Gotsman C. and Popovic J. "Mesh-based Inverse Kinematics", ACM Transactions on Graphics, 24(3):488–495, (Proc. SIGGRAPH), 2005.
- Bogomjakov A. and Gotsman C. "Universal Rendering Sequences for Transparent Vertex Caching of Progressive Meshes", Computer Graphics Forum, 21(2):137–148, 2002.
- Karni Z. and Gotsman C. "Spectral Compression of Mesh Geometry", Computer Graphics (Proc. SIGGRAPH), 279–286, 2000.
- Touma C. and Gotsman C. "Triangle Mesh Compression", Proc. Graphics Interface 98, 1998.
- Rabinovich B. and Gotsman C. "Visualization of Large Terrains in Resource-Limited Computing Environments", Proc. IEEE Visualization, 1997.
