= Pini Gurfil =

Israeli aerospace engineer, university professor, author

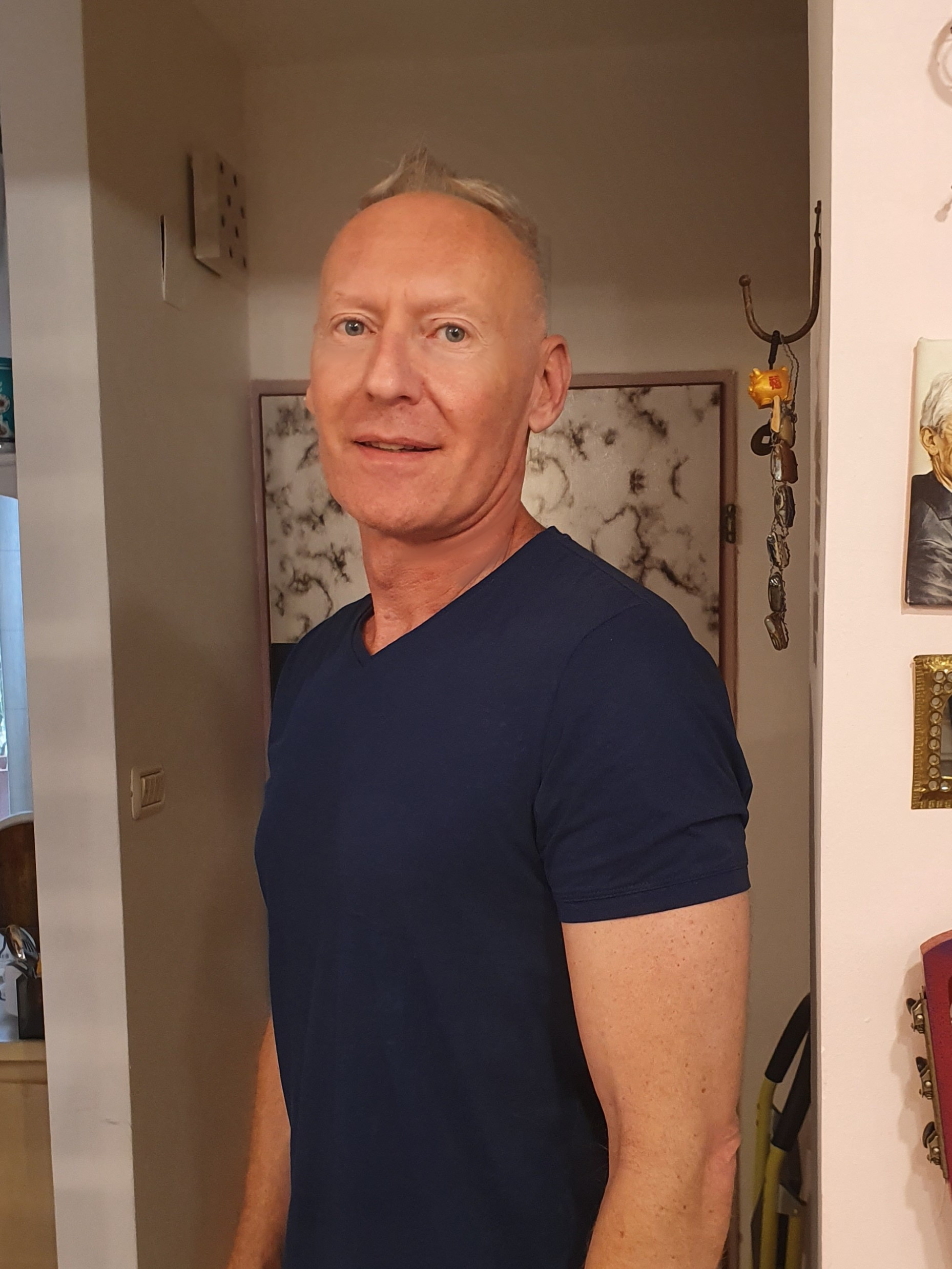
- Born: Pinchas Gurfil; April 26, 1971 (age 55); Chișinău, Moldavian SSR, Soviet Union (now Moldova)
- Education: Technion – Israel Institute of Technology (BSc, MSc, PhD)
- Occupations: Aerospace engineer, university professor, author, musician
- Known for: Pioneer of satellite formation flying; Principal Investigator of the Adelis-SAMSON mission; research in astrodynamics; developing algorithms for satellite guidance, navigation and control; Hebrew poetry; music albums
- Notable work: Spacecraft Formation Flying: Dynamics, Control and Navigation (Book)

Pinchas (Pini) Gurfil (Hebrew: פנחס (פיני) גורפיל; born April 26, 1971) is an Israeli professor of aerospace engineering at the Technion – Israel Institute of Technology. He was the head of the Asher Space Research Institute and the director of the Adelis-SAMSON satellite project. In addition to his academic work, Gurfil has published Hebrew-language poetry and is a musician.

== Education ==
Gurfil received all three of his academic degrees from the Technion Faculty of Aerospace Engineering. He earned his BSc in 1994, his MSc in 1998, and his PhD in 2000. From 2000 to 2003, he was a postdoctoral associate at Princeton University in the Department of Mechanical and Aerospace Engineering, under the guidance of N. Jeremy Kasdin.

== Academic career ==
Gurfil holds the Shirley & Burt Harris Chair and serves as a chaired professor in Technion's Faculty of Aerospace Engineering. He joined the Faculty of Aerospace Engineering at the Technion in 2004. He was promoted to full professor in 2018. From 2015 to 2020, he served as the head of the Asher Space Research Institute (ASRI).

Gurfil is an Associate Fellow of the American Institute of Aeronautics and Astronautics (AIAA), a Full Member of the International Academy of Astronautics (IAA), and a Member of the International Astronomical Union. (IAU)

=== Research ===
Gurfil's research focuses on astrodynamics, spacecraft orbital mechanics, guidance, navigation and control, and space systems engineering. A significant area of his work involves satellite formation flying, including research on operating multiple coordinated satellites using natural forces such as atmospheric drag, and research on fractionated spacecraft, for which Gurfil received a highly-competitive grant from the European Research Council (ERC). While at Princeton University, Gurfil worked on NASA's Terrestrial Planet Finder formation-flying mission.

As head of the Asher Space Research Institute, he led the Adelis- SAMSON space mission, the first-ever initiative to design, build, and launch three autonomous coordinated nanosatellites. The project, a collaboration with the Israeli space industry, aimed to demonstrate formation-flying technologies for search-and-rescue and geolocation purposes, and was launched in March 2021 on board a Soyuz-2 launcher.

Gurfil has also been involved in promoting international space collaboration, as well as in studies concerning Israel Space Agency's strategic planning, and has commented on national space policy and exploration initiatives, such as the Beresheet lunar lander.

== Academic publications ==
=== Authored books ===
- Alfriend, Kyle T.; Vadali, Srinivas Rao; Gurfil, Pini; How, Jonathan P.; Breger, Louis (2009). Spacecraft Formation Flying: Dynamics, Control and Navigation. Butterworth-Heinemann. doi:10.1016/C2009-0-17485-8. ISBN 978-0-7506-8533-7.
- Gurfil, Pini; Seidelmann, P. Kenneth (2016). Celestial Mechanics and Astrodynamics: Theory and Practice. Springer. doi:10.1007/978-3-662-50370-6. ISBN 978-3-662-50368-3.

=== Edited books ===
- Belbruno, Edward; Folta, David; Gurfil, Pini, eds. (2004). Astrodynamics, Space Missions, and Chaos. New York Academy of Sciences. ISBN 978-1-57331-512-8.
- Gurfil, Pini, ed. (2006). Modern Astrodynamics. Elsevier Science. doi:10.1016/s1874-9305(07)x8001-4. ISBN 978-0-12-373562-1.

=== Selected articles ===
- Carmi, A.; Gurfil, P.; Kanevsky, D. (2010). "Methods for sparse signal recovery using Kalman filtering with embedded pseudo-measurement norms and quasi-norms". IEEE Transactions on Signal Processing. 58 (4): 2405–2409. Bibcode:2010ITSP...58.2405C. doi:10.1109/tsp.2009.2038959.
- Segal, S.; Carmi, A.; Gurfil, P. (2014). "Stereovision-based estimation of relative dynamics between noncooperative satellites: Theory and experiments". IEEE Transactions on Control Systems Technology. 22 (2): 568–584. Bibcode:2014ITCST..22..568S. doi:10.1109/tcst.2013.2255288.
- Segal, S.; Gurfil, P. (2009). "Effect of kinematic rotation-translation coupling on relative spacecraft translational dynamics". Journal of Guidance, Control, and Dynamics. 32 (3): 1045–1050. Bibcode:2009JGCD...32.1045S. doi:10.2514/1.39320.
- Gurfil, P. (2005). "Relative motion between elliptic orbits: generalized boundedness conditions and optimal formationkeeping". Journal of Guidance, Control, and Dynamics. 28 (4): 761–767. Bibcode:2005JGCD...28..761G. doi:10.2514/1.9439.
- Gurfil, P.; Idan, M.; Kasdin, N.J. (2003). "Adaptive neural control of deep-space formation flying". Journal of Guidance, Control, and Dynamics. 26 (3): 491–501. Bibcode:2003JGCD...26..491G. doi:10.2514/2.5072.
- Gurfil, P.; Kholshevnikov, K.V. (2006). "Manifolds and Metrics in the Relative Spacecraft Motion Problem". Journal of Guidance, Control, and Dynamics. 29 (4): 1004–1010. Bibcode:2006JGCD...29.1004G. doi:10.2514/1.15531.
- Ben-Yaacov, O.; Gurfil, P. (2013). "Long-Term Cluster Flight of Multiple Satellites Using Differential Drag". Journal of Guidance, Control, and Dynamics. 36 (6): 1658–1670. Bibcode:2013JGCD...36.1731B. doi:10.2514/1.61496.

== Poetry and musical career ==
Gurfil has published poetry and is a singer-songwriter.

He began releasing recorded music in the early 2020s, with his first studio album Just Below My Cover appearing in 2022, followed by Read the Lyrics in 2024.

Singles such as "Reborn", "Anny", "Call It Art" and "Final Romance" have been reviewed by specialist outlets. Punk Head highlighted the philosophical and cinematic qualities of Anny. The single Final Romance (2024) was noted by TJPL News for its blend of art rock and retro influences with shifting time signatures.

Reviews of the 2024 album Read the Lyrics in outlets such as Less Than 1000 Followers described it as an "experimental and poetic" project that blends progressive rock, jazz and rockabilly elements with introspective lyricism.

=== Discography ===
Studio albums

- Just Below My Cover (2022)
- Read the Lyrics (2024)

=== Hebrew poetry ===
- Gurfil, Pini (2015). Nekudat Magoz. Tel Aviv: Gevanim. ISBN 978-9-655-34590-2.
- Gurfil, Pini (2015). Nolad La-amirah. Tel Aviv: Gevanim. ISBN 978-9-655-34673-2.
