= Neil Gehrels =

American astrophysicist (1953–2017)

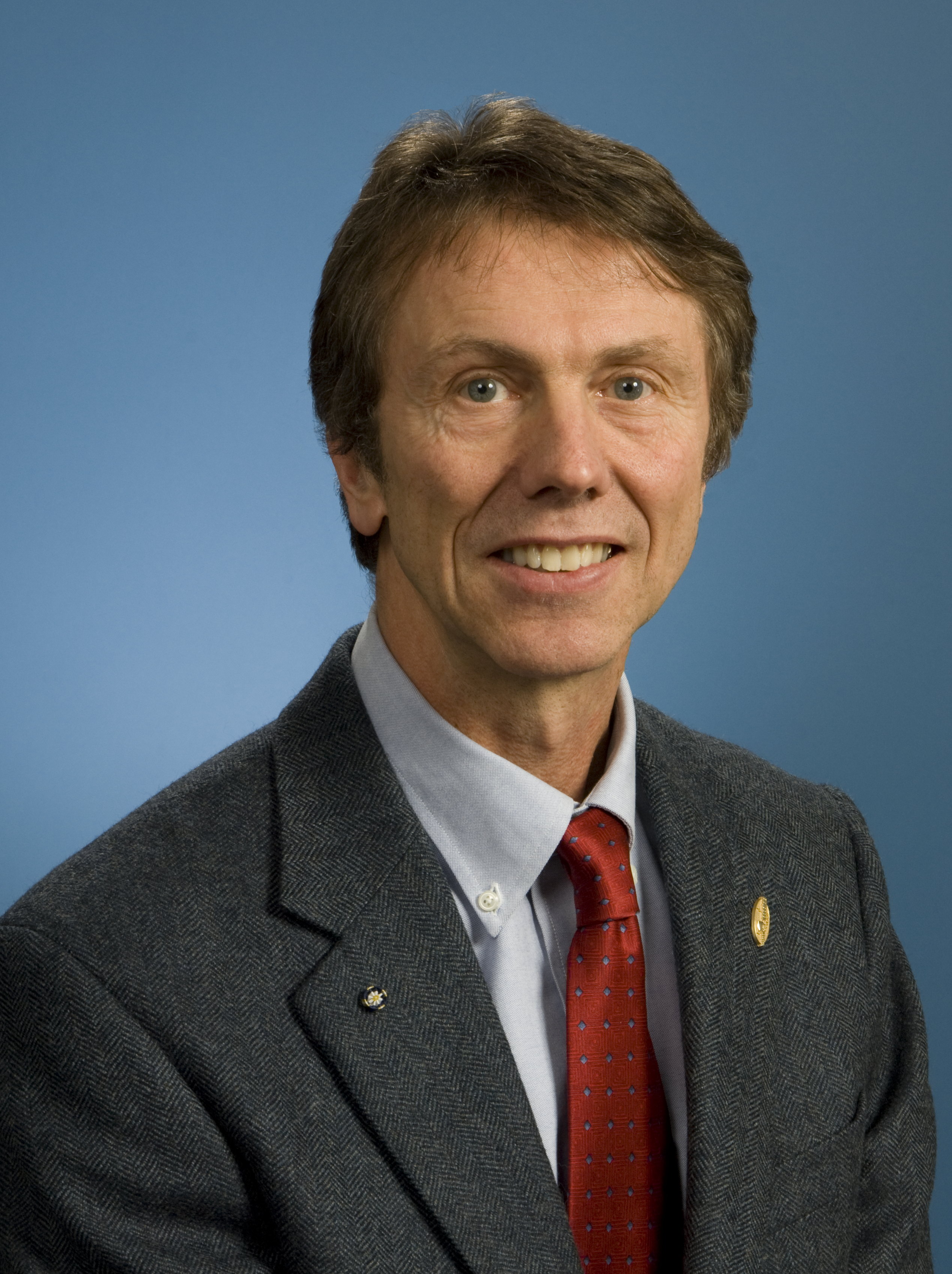
- Born: Cornelis A. Gehrels; October 3, 1952; Lake Geneva, Wisconsin, U.S.
- Died: February 6, 2017 (aged 64); Berwyn Heights, Maryland, U.S.
- Education: Caltech
- Awards: Henry Draper Medal (2009)
- Scientific career
- Fields: Astrophysics
- Thesis: Energetic oxygen and sulfur ions in the Jovian magnetosphere (1982)
- Doctoral advisors: Edward C. Stone; Rochus E. Vogt

Cornelis A. "Neil" Gehrels (October 3, 1952 – February 6, 2017) was an American astrophysicist specializing in the field of gamma-ray astronomy. He was Chief of the Astroparticle Physics Laboratory at NASA's Goddard Space Flight Center (GSFC) from 1995 until his death, and was best known for his work developing the field from early balloon instruments to space observatories such as the NASA Swift mission, for which he was the principal investigator. Gehrels led the WFIRST (later named the Nancy Grace Roman Space Telescope) wide-field infrared telescope towards a launch in August 2026. He was a member of the National Academy of Sciences and the American Academy of Arts and Sciences.

Gehrels died on February 6, 2017, at the age of 64. On January 10, 2018, NASA announced that Swift had been renamed the Neil Gehrels Swift Observatory, in his honor.

== Early life and education ==
Gehrels was born in Lake Geneva, Wisconsin, on October 3, 1952. His father was astronomer Tom Gehrels. He grew up near several telescopes including living at McDonald Observatory before his family settled in Tucson, Arizona, when he was 14, where he attended high school and then the University of Arizona as an undergraduate student. He received bachelor's degrees in music and physics from UofA in 1976. He received his Ph.D. in physics in 1982 from the California Institute of Technology, with Edward C. Stone and Rochus Eugen Vogt as advisers. He took a postdoctoral position at NASA's Goddard Space Flight Center in 1981 working with Bonnard J. Teegarden. In 1982, he became permanent at GSFC as an astrophysicist.

In 1980 while in graduate school, he married fellow graduate student Ellen Williams, who is a professor of physics at the University of Maryland and Director of ARPA-E at the Department of Energy. They have two children, Thomas (born 1987) and Emily (born 1990). Gehrels died of pancreatic cancer at the age of 64 on February 6, 2017.

== Career ==
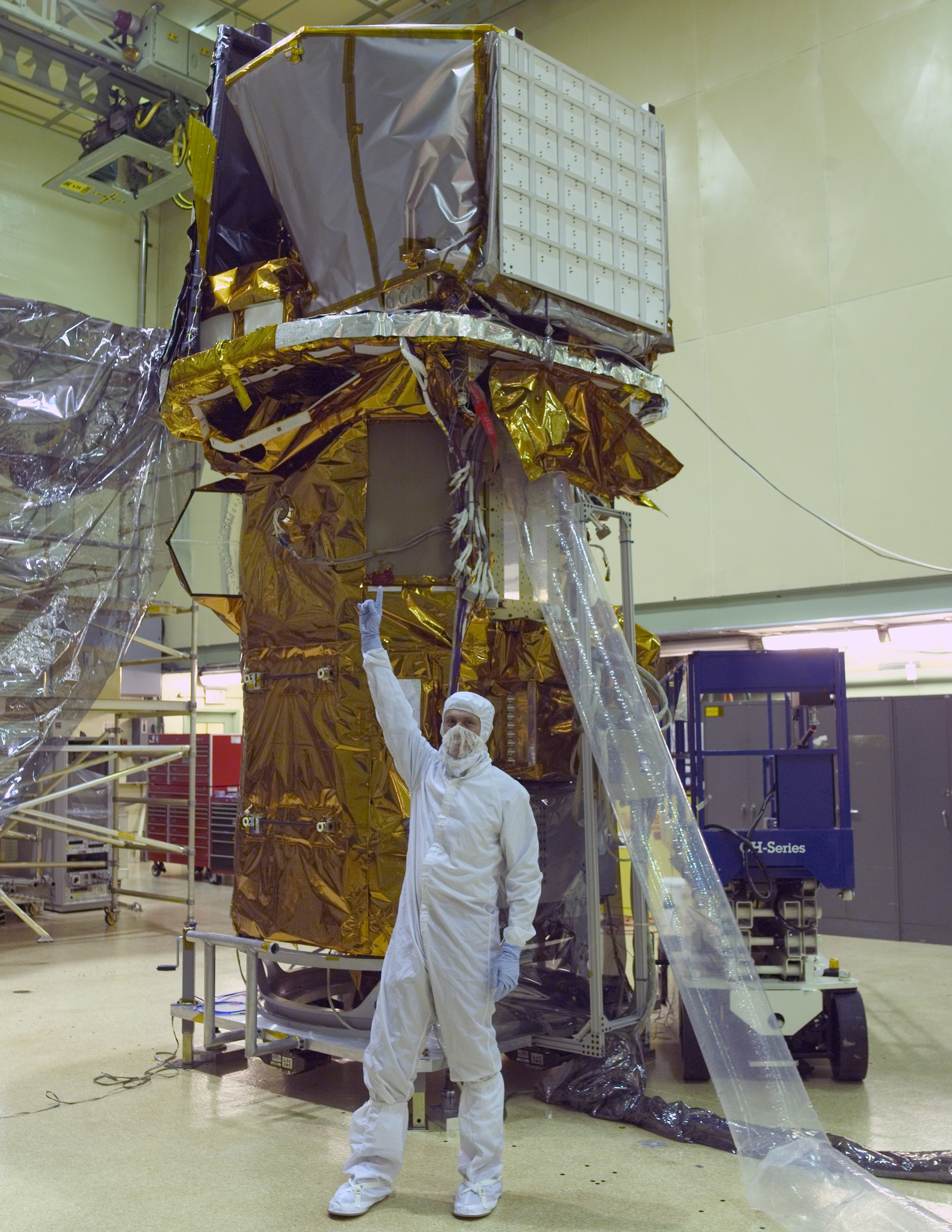
Neil Gehrels in cleanroom with Swift space telescope

Gehrels was chief of the Astroparticle Physics Laboratory at NASA's Goddard Space Flight Center starting in 1995. He was the principal investigator for the Swift Gamma-Ray Burst Mission. Other responsibilities include: project scientist for the Compton Gamma Ray Observatory (1991–2000), Mission scientist for Mission INTEGRAL, deputy project scientist for the Fermi Gamma-ray Space Telescope and project scientist for the Nancy Grace Roman Space Telescope, then known as the Wide Field Infrared Survey Telescope (WFIRST). He was also a professor at the University of Maryland College of Computer, Mathematical, and Natural Sciences at University of Maryland and adjunct professor of astronomy and astrophysics at Pennsylvania State University. His research focused on transient objects in the universe such as gamma-ray bursts (GRBs), supernova and active galaxy flares. He worked to develop gamma-ray astrophysics from a field of experiments detecting a few objects to a full astronomical discipline with thousands of sources in many classes.

He was elected chair of the Astronomy Section of the National Academy of Sciences in 2013. He published over 600 academic articles, which have been cited 40,000 times for an h-index of 97. His most cited works include papers on the discovery of the origin of short gamma-ray bursts, the Swift satellite, Poisson statistics, observations of gamma-ray bursts at the edge of the visible universe, discovery of a relativistic tidal disruption event, and finding of two classes of active galactic nuclei (AGN) in the gamma-ray band.

== Research ==
=== Overview ===
Gehrels was an astrophysicist with broad interests. He worked predominantly in the area of high-energy astrophysics, studying explosive objects in the universe such as supernovae, gamma-ray bursts, gravitational wave transients and tidal disruption events (stars torn apart when they approach too close to a massive black hole). He was also a laboratory physicist developing instrumentation for space observation.

=== Graduate studies ===
Gehrels's graduate schooling was at Caltech, working with advisors Rochus Vogt (1976–1979) and Edward C. Stone (1979–1981). The early period was spent performing laboratory and accelerator calibrations of the cosmic ray instrument on Voyager. The later years saw analysis of data from the instrument during the fly-bys of Jupiter (1979 for both Voyager 1 and 2). The elemental abundance of MeV particles in the Jovian magnetosphere was expected to be dominated by hydrogen and helium, so it was a surprise to find oxygen and sulfur dominant. This discovery was found to be related to the Voyager discovery of volcanoes on the moon Io spewing oxygen and sulfur into the magnetosphere. The Gehrels and Stone paper describing the measurement made a prediction, later confirmed, that the auroral emissions on Jupiter are cause by precipitating oxygen and sulfur ions.

=== Balloon Observations of SN 1987A ===
As a postdoc and then permanent scientist at Goddard, Gehrels worked on the GRIS balloon payload for high resolution (germanium detector) spectroscopy of gamma-ray sources. He first was involved in the proposal to NASA for the instrument, specializing in the design and techniques for background reduction. The payload was nearing completion when Supernova 1987A was discovered. The construction was quickly finished and the instrument flown to observe the gamma-ray line emission from Co-56 decay. The GRIS detection of a broadened and redshift 847 keV line was some of the first strong evidence for mixing and asymmetries in the ejecta, now recognized as signature characteristics of supernova explosions.

=== Compton Gamma Ray Observatory ===
Gehrels was the project scientist for the Compton Gamma Ray Observatory from its launch in 1991 to de-orbit in 2000. He followed Don Kniffen, who was project scientist during the development. The mission was one of the Great Observatories and provided the first comprehensive observations of the gamma-ray sky from 30 keV to 30 GeV. Discoveries include an isotropic distribution of gamma-ray bursts (GRBs) on the sky, supporting an extragalactic origin, two classes of GRBs with short and long durations, blazars with bright gamma-ray emission and harder spectra than Seyfert AGN (e.g. Dermer & Gehrels 1995), detailed mapping of gamma-rays from Al-26 decay in the galactic plane mapping regions of nucleosynthesis over the past million years, and detailed mapping of the 511 keV line from positron annihilation in the galaxy with concentration at the galactic center. Gehrels, et al. (Nature, 2000) found a new population of mid-latitude high energy gamma-ray sources.

=== Swift and Fermi observatories ===
Gehrels was the principal investigator of the Swift mission and deputy project scientist for the Fermi observatory. Swift is a three-instrument satellite launched in 2004 and designed to study GRBs and their afterglows. Since approximately 2009, it has become a community tool for observing transient and variable sources of all types including novae, supernova, AGN, magnetars, galactic black hole and neutron stars, tidal disruption events, and comets. Several requests are received per day. Gehrels led the Swift proposal, oversaw the development, and was chief scientist of the operations. Scientifically, he led several papers, including the discovery paper of short GRB afterglow and origin (Gehrels et al. Nature, 2005), and played a significant role in many others. The mission has characterized the afterglow and origin of short GRB for the first time, determine the shape of the X-ray and optical afterglow lightcurves to great precision and with large statistics (>1000 GRBs), provided a comprehensive data set of UV observation of supernova, and discovered X-ray outbursts from supernova shock breakouts and relativistically beamed tidal disruption events.

While Gehrels was chair of the lllSenior lllScientist lllAdvisory lllCommittee of the LAT instrument collaboration, he worked alongside leading scientists at Goddard, Stanford, the United States Naval Research Laboratory, and several other institutions to propose the mission and manifest it. Every three hours, Fermi scans the full sky in the high-energy gamma ray band for observations. This technology has the goal of understanding the high energy gamma ray space filling our skies with observations of pulsars, AGN, GRBs, novae, and diffuse emissions.

=== WFIRST Era ===
Gehrels joined the SNAP dark energy mission proposal led by Saul Perlmutter and Michael Levi in 2008. This evolved in the DOE-NASA Joint Dark Energy Mission (JDEM) program, for which Gehrels became the project scientist and chaired the Science Coordination Group in 2009. He led the proposal of JDEM to the 2010 Decadal Survey. This mission was combined with two other proposals to become the top ranked large mission WFIRST (now known as the Nancy Grace Roman Space Telescope). It is a wide-field infrared survey observatory. In 2012, NASA decided to use a donated 2.4 m (7 ft 10 in) Hubble-class telescope for WFIRST and to add a coronagraph instrument to the primary wide-field infrared survey instrument. The telescope launched in August 2026. It will perform observations at Hubble depth and image resolution with 100 times the field of view of Hubble, and will make direct imaging and spectroscopic measurement of exoplanets. The science areas are dark energy/cosmology, exoplanets, and general astrophysics. The mission began Phase A development in 2016. Gehrels was the project scientist and chaired the Formulation Science Working Group with co-chairs Jeremy Kasdin and David Spergel.

=== Other scientific work ===
Working at the conjunction of data analysis and theory, Gehrels wrote several papers of general interest:

- 1986 highly referenced paper on statistical confidence limits for small numbers of events, particularly in astrophysical data
- 1993 paper with Jack Tueller on the gamma-ray emission from the galactic ridge
- 1993 paper with wife Ellen Williams on temperatures of enhanced stability in hot thin plasmas
- 1993 Nature paper with Wan Chen on the Geminga supernova as a cause of the Local Bubble
- 1997 in Il Nuovo Cimento on the use of nu_Fnu spectral energy distributions
- 2003 paper with several co-authors on depletion of the Earth's ozone from nearby supernovae
- 2015 paper with John Cannizzo and several other co-authors on the galaxy observation strategy for follow-up observations of gravitational wave detections with large error regions on the sky

== Awards and honors ==
- 2017, Dan David Prize, astronomy (with Shrinivas Kulkarni and Andrzesj Udalski)
- 2016, Caltech Distinguished Alumni Award
- 2016, Milner Breakthrough Prize for LIGO gravitational wave discovery (Drever, Thorne, Weiss & LIGO Team)
- 2016, Physical Sciences Award, Washington Academy of Science
- 2016, Honorary Fellow, Royal Astronomical Society
- 2015, Asteroid 16000 Neilgehrels named in his honor
- 2012, Fellow, American Association for the Advancement of Science
- 2012, Alumnus of the Year, Honors College, University of Arizona
- 2012, Harrie Massey Award of COSPAR
- 2011, Member, International Academy of Astronautics
- 2010, Member, National Academy of Sciences
- 2009, George W. Goddard Award, SPIE
- 2009, Henry Draper Medal, National Academy of Sciences
- 2008, Member, American Academy of Arts and Sciences
- 2007, Bruno Rossi Prize, American Astronomical Society
- 2005, NASA Exceptional Scientific Achievement Medal
- 2000, Randolph Lovelace Award, American Astronautical Society
- 1993, Fellow, American Physical Society
- 1976–1977, Caltech Graduate Fellowship

== Selected publications ==
- 2016, "Galaxy Strategy for LIGO-VIRGO Gravitational Wave Counterpart Searches", N. Gehrels, et al., ApJ, 820, 136.
- 2015, "WFIRST Science Definition Team Report", D. Spergel, N. Gehrels et al., arXiv 1503.03757.
- 2014, "GRB 130427A: A Nearby Ordinary Monster", A. Maselli, et al., Science, 343, 48.
- 2012, "Fermi Large Area Telescope Second Source Catalog", P. Nolan, et al., ApJ Supp, 199, 31.
- 2011, "Relativistic Jet Activities from the Tidal Disruption of a Star by a Massive Black Hole", D. N. Burrows, et al., Nature, 476, 421.
- 2009, "Gamma Ray Bursts in the Swift Era", N. Gehrels, E. Ramirez-Ruiz, & D. B. Fox, ARAA, 47, 567.
- 2006, "The New Gamma Ray Burst Classification Scheme from GRB 060614", N. Gehrels, et al., Nature, 444, 1044.
- 2006, "Detection, Huge Explosion in the Early Universe", G. Cusumano, et al., Nature, 440, 164
- 2005, "A Short GRB Apparently Associated with an Elliptical Galaxy at Redshift z=0.225", N. Gehrels, et al., Nature 437, 851.
- 2005, "Swift Detection of a Giant Flare from SGR 1806-20", D. Palmer, et al., Nature, 434, 1107.
- 2004, "The Swift Gamma Ray Burst Mission", N. Gehrels, et al., ApJ, 611, 105.
- 2003, "Ozone Depletion from Nearby Supernovae", N. Gehrels, C. Laird, C. Jackman, J. Cannizzo & B. Mattson, Astrophys. J., 585, 1169.
- 2000, "New Population of Galactic High Energy Gamma Ray Sources", N. Gehrels, D. Macomb, D. Bertsch, D. Thompson,& R. Hartman, Nature, 404, 363.
- 1999, "Revisiting the Black Hole", R. Blandford & N. Gehrels, Physics Today, June 1999 p. 40.
- 1998, "The New Gamma Ray Astronomy", N. Gehrels and J. Paul, Physics Today, February 1998 issue, p. 26.
- 1995, "Two Classes of Gamma-Ray Emitting Active Galactic Nuclei", C. Dermer & N. Gehrels, Astrophys. J., 447, 103.
- 1993, "The Geminga Supernova as a Possible Cause of the Local Interstellar Bubble", N. Gehrels & W. Chen, Nature 361, 706.
- 1993, "Temperatures of Enhanced Stability in Hot Thin Plasmas", N. Gehrels & E. D. Williams, ApJ, 418, L25.
- 1987, "Prospects for Observations of Nucleosynthetic Gamma-Ray Lines and Continuum from SN 1987A", N. Gehrels, C.J. MacCallum and M. Leventhal, ApJ, 320, L19.
- 1986, "Confidence Limits for Small Numbers of Events in Astrophysical Data", N. Gehrels, ApJ, 303, 336.
- 1985, "Instrumental Background in Balloon-Borne Gamma-Ray Spectrometers and Techniques for Its Reduction", N. Gehrels, NIM, A239, 324.
- 1983, "Energetic Oxygen and Sulfur in the Jovian Magnetosphere and Its Contribution to the Auroral Excitation", N. Gehrels and E. C. Stone, JGR, 88, 5537.
