= Technion Faculty of Electrical Engineering =

Technion Faculty of Electrical and Computer Engineering
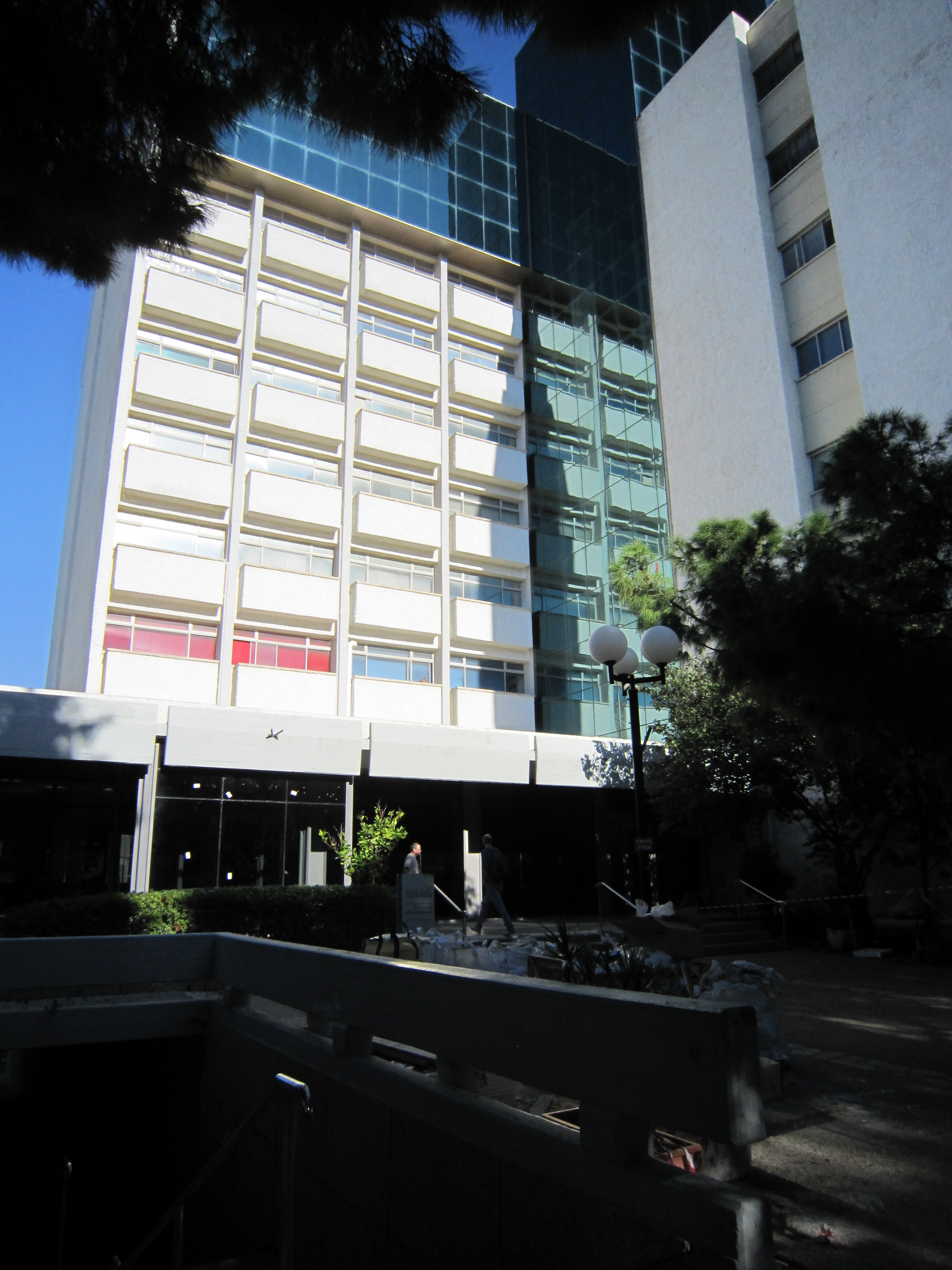
- Parent institution: Technion
- Established: 1947
- Dean: Idit Keidar
- Location: Haifa, Israel
- Website: vee.technion.ac.il

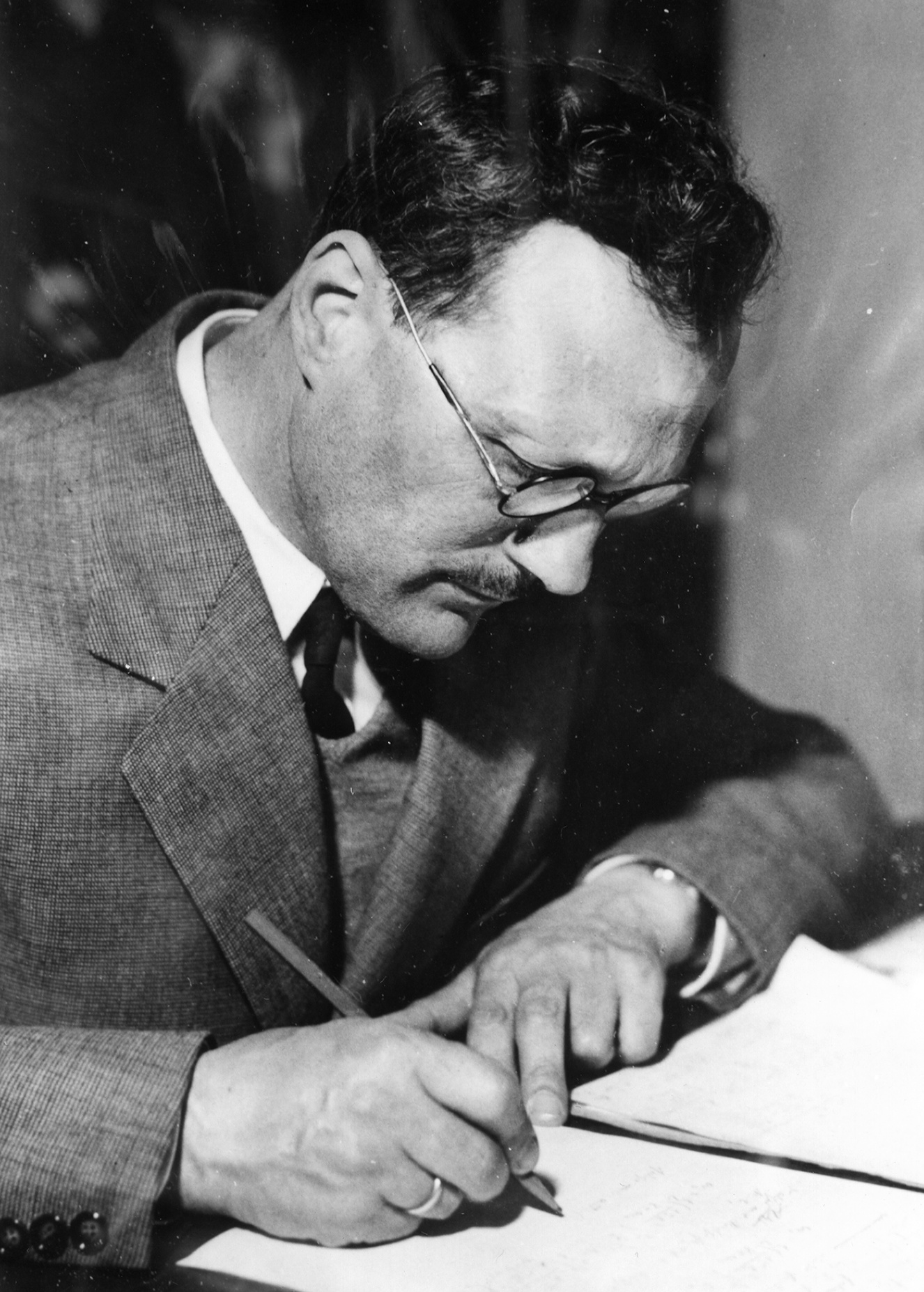
Franz Ollendorff founder of the Faculty of Technology in 1938 the ancestor of the Faculty of Electrical Engineering

The Technion Faculty of Electrical and Computer Engineering is an academic faculty of the Technion founded in 1947 before the State of Israel which focuses on the training of electrical engineers and computer engineers in various disciplines including CAD, VLSI, Image processing, Signal processing, Solid-state electronics, communication systems, integrated circuits, Parallel computing and systems, and embedded systems. The current dean of faculty is Professor Idit Keidar.

== History ==
In 1938 Franz Ollendorff, an Israeli physicist, established the department of Electrical Engineering under the Faculty of Technology. Franz became its first dean the following year. In 1947 the Faculty of Electrical Engineering was established after it split from the Faculty of Technology. In 2021 it was renamed The Viterbi Faculty of Electrical and Computer Engineering.

== Today ==
Today, the Faculty of Electrical and Computer Engineering is the largest faculty in the Technion with over 2,000 undergraduate students and over 400 master and doctorate students. The faculty consistently ranks among the top 10 Electrical and Computer Engineering faculties in the world.

== See also ==
- Asher Space Research Institute
- Technion Faculty of Aerospace Engineering
- Technion – Israel Institute of Technology
