= Nancy Grace Roman Space Telescope =

NASA infrared space telescope launched in 2026

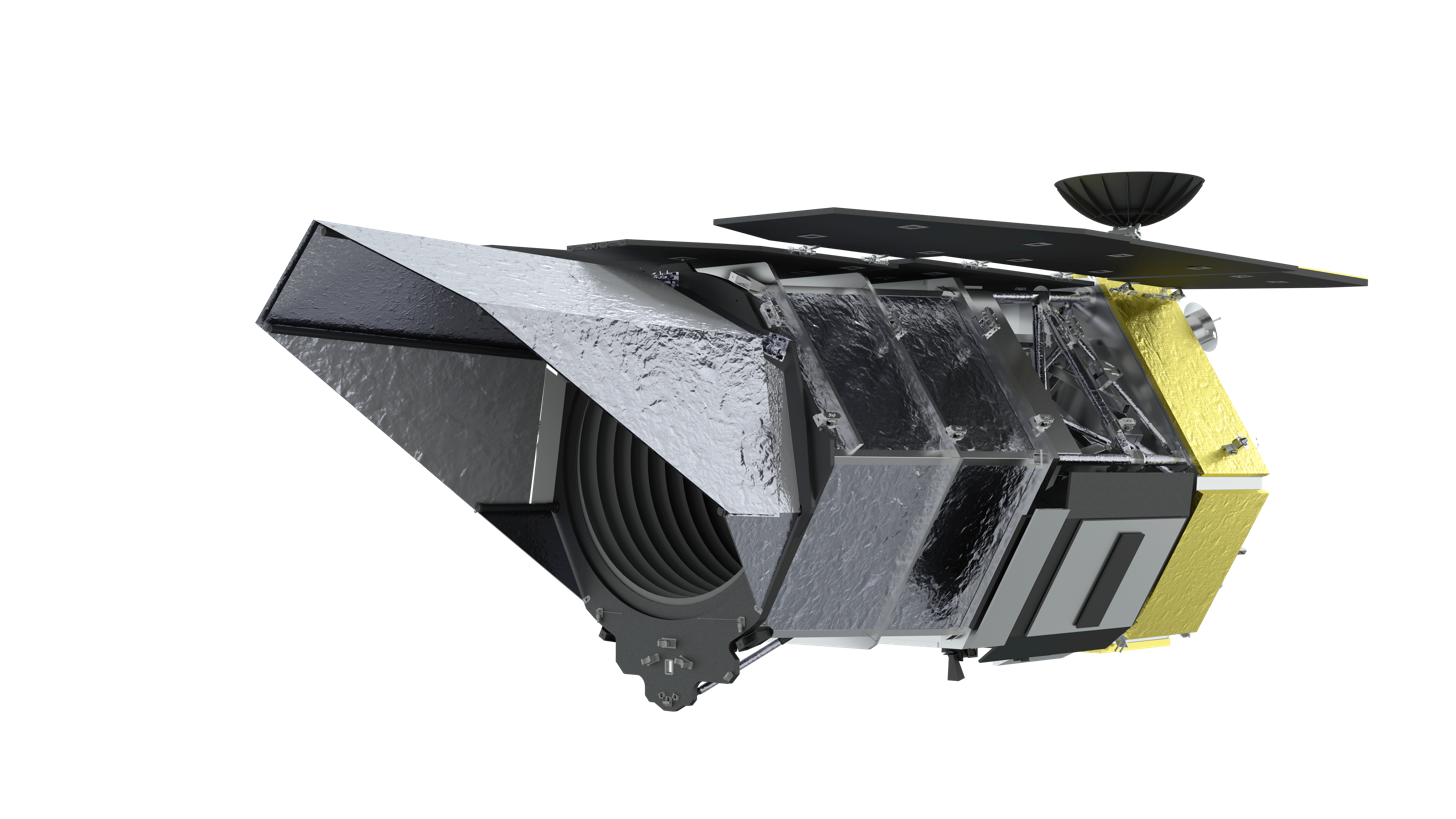
- Rendered model of the Nancy Grace Roman Space Telescope
- Names: Wide-Field Infrared Survey Telescope (WFIRST); Joint Dark Energy Mission (JDEM)
- Mission type: Infrared space telescope
- Operator: NASA / GSFC
- COSPAR ID: 2026-199A
- SATCAT no.: 100532
- Website: science.nasa.gov/mission/roman-space-telescope/
- Mission duration: 5 years (planned); 2 months, 23 days (elapsed)

Spacecraft properties
- Manufacturer: NASA Goddard Space Flight Center
- Launch mass: 9,174 kg (20,225 lb)
- Power: 4.1 kW

Start of mission
- Launch date: 30 August 2026, 11:26:04 UTC (7:26:04 AM EDT)
- Rocket: Falcon Heavy Block 5 (B1105 / B1072‑3 / B1104‑1), Flight 13
- Launch site: Kennedy, LC-39A
- Contractor: SpaceX

Orbital parameters
- Reference system: Sun–Earth L_{2} orbit
- Regime: Halo orbit

Main telescope
- Type: Three-mirror anastigmat
- Diameter: 2.4 m (7.9 ft)
- Focal length: 19 m (62 ft)
- Focal ratio: f/7.9
- Wavelengths: 0.48–2.30 μm (blue to near-infrared)

Transponders
- Band: S-band (TT&C support); K_{a}-band (data acquisition)
- Bandwidth: Few kbit/s duplex (S-band); 290 Mbit/s (K_{a}-band)
Instruments
- WFI: Wide-Field Instrument
- CGI: Coronagraph Instrument
- Large Strategic Science Missions; Astrophysics Division

The Nancy Grace Roman Space Telescope is a NASA infrared space telescope that was launched on a trajectory toward a Sun–Earth L_{2} orbit on 30 August 2026. It is named after NASA's first chief of astronomy, Nancy Grace Roman.

The telescope is based on an existing 2.4-meter (7.9-foot) primary mirror with a wide field of view that was donated by the National Reconnaissance Office and will carry two scientific instruments. The Wide-Field Instrument (WFI) is a 300.8-megapixel multi-band visible and near-infrared camera, providing image sharpness comparable to the Hubble Space Telescope over a 0.28-square-degree field of view, 100 times larger than imaging cameras on the Hubble. The Coronagraph Instrument (CGI) is a high-contrast, small-field-of-view camera and spectrometer covering visible and near-infrared wavelengths using novel starlight-suppression technology.

Its objectives include a search for exoplanets using gravitational microlensing, along with probing the chronology of the universe and growth of cosmic structure, with the end goal of measuring the effects of dark energy, the consistency of general relativity, and the curvature of spacetime. Roman was recommended in 2010 by the United States National Research Council Decadal Survey committee as the top priority for the next decade of astronomy. It was approved for development and launch on 17 February 2016. NASA expects to release Roman's first science images by early 2027.

== Science objectives ==
The science objectives of Roman aim to address cutting-edge questions in cosmology and exoplanet research, including:

- Answering basic questions about dark energy, complementary to the European Space Agency (ESA) Euclid mission, and including: Is cosmic acceleration caused by a new energy component or by the breakdown of general relativity on cosmological scales? If the cause is a new energy component, is its energy density constant in space and time, or has it evolved over the history of the universe? Roman will use three independent techniques to probe dark energy: baryon acoustic oscillations, observations of distant supernovae, and weak gravitational lensing.
- Completing a census of exoplanets to help answer new questions about the potential for life in the universe: How common are star systems like the Solar System? What kinds of planets exist in the cold, outer regions of planetary systems? What determines the habitability of Earth-like worlds? This census makes use of a technique that can find exoplanets down to a mass only a few times that of the Moon: gravitational microlensing. The census would also include a sample of free-floating planets with masses likely down to the mass of Mars.
- Establishing a guest investigator mode, enabling survey investigations to answer diverse questions about the Milky Way Galaxy and the universe.
- Providing a coronagraph for exoplanet direct imaging that will provide the first direct images and spectra of planets around the Solar System's nearest neighbors, similar to giant planets.
- Detection of primordial black holes.

== Instruments ==
The telescope carries two instruments. Both were installed into the telescope in December 2024.

=== Wide-Field Instrument ===
The Wide-Field Instrument (WFI) is the primary science instrument for the mission. It is a 300.8-megapixel camera, providing multiband imaging and spectroscopy from the visible to near-infrared (0.48 to 2.30 μm). Eight science filters, one wide band, and seven more narrow filters, provide high-quality images in subsets of the total spectral bandwidth of the instrument. It carries a high-dispersion grism and lower-dispersion prism assemblies for wide-field slitless spectroscopy.

A "dark element" made out of spectralon can block out the light from space and reflect calibration light onto the detector. The eight filters, two spectroscopy elements, and dark element are all attached to an Element Wheel Assembly (EWA) that rotates one element at a time into the active position.This enables the scientists to choose which colors of light are needed for each mission, or switch between imaging and spectroscopy modes.

A HgCdTe-based focal-plane array (FPA) captures a 0.28 square degree field of view with a resolution of 0.11 arcseconds. The detector array is composed of 18 H4RG-10 detectors provided by Teledyne. The instrument carries on-board calibration capability to help the scientists discern the subtle changes in images from their dark matter mission compared to ordinary distortions of the optics or of the FPA. The FPA is attached to a set of hexapod actuators that can reposition the focal plane into the best focus position based on analysis from the ground to ensure the captured images are always of high quality over the lifetime of the mission. WFI was completed and shipped to NASA in August 2024.

=== Coronagraph Instrument ===
The Coronagraph Instrument (CGI) is a high-contrast coronagraph covering shorter wavelengths (575 nm to 825 nm) using dual deformable mirror starlight-suppression technology. It is intended to achieve a part-per-billion suppression of starlight to enable the detection and spectroscopy of planets with a visual separation of as little as 0.15 arcseconds from their host stars. CGI is intended as a technology demonstrator for an exoplanet imaging instrument on a future large space-based observatory, such as the Habitable Worlds Observatory (HWO).

Wide Field Instrument

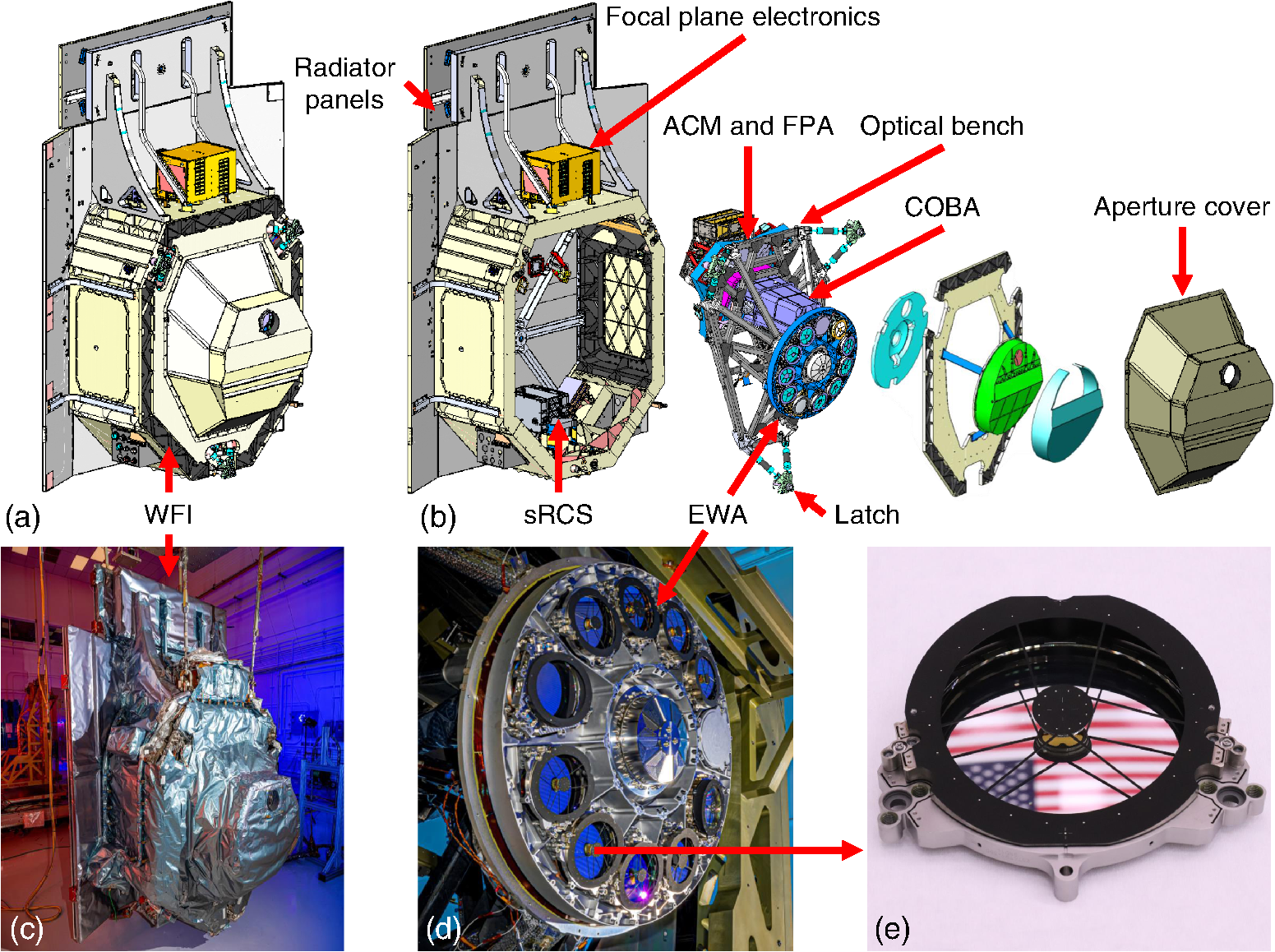
Wide Field Instrument: exploded view

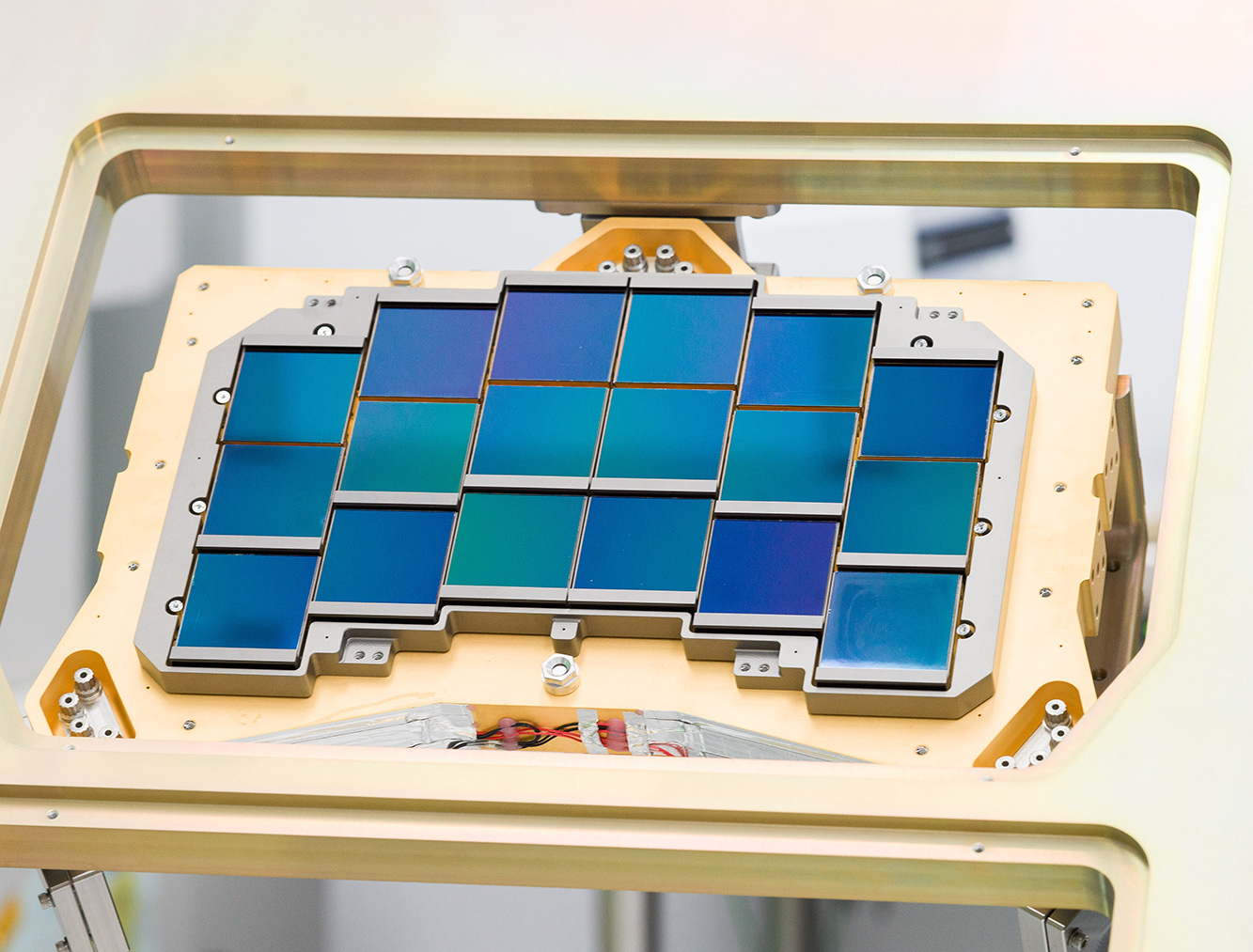
Roman's Wide Field Instrument focal plane Engineering Test Unit with 18 non-flight H4RG-10 detectors

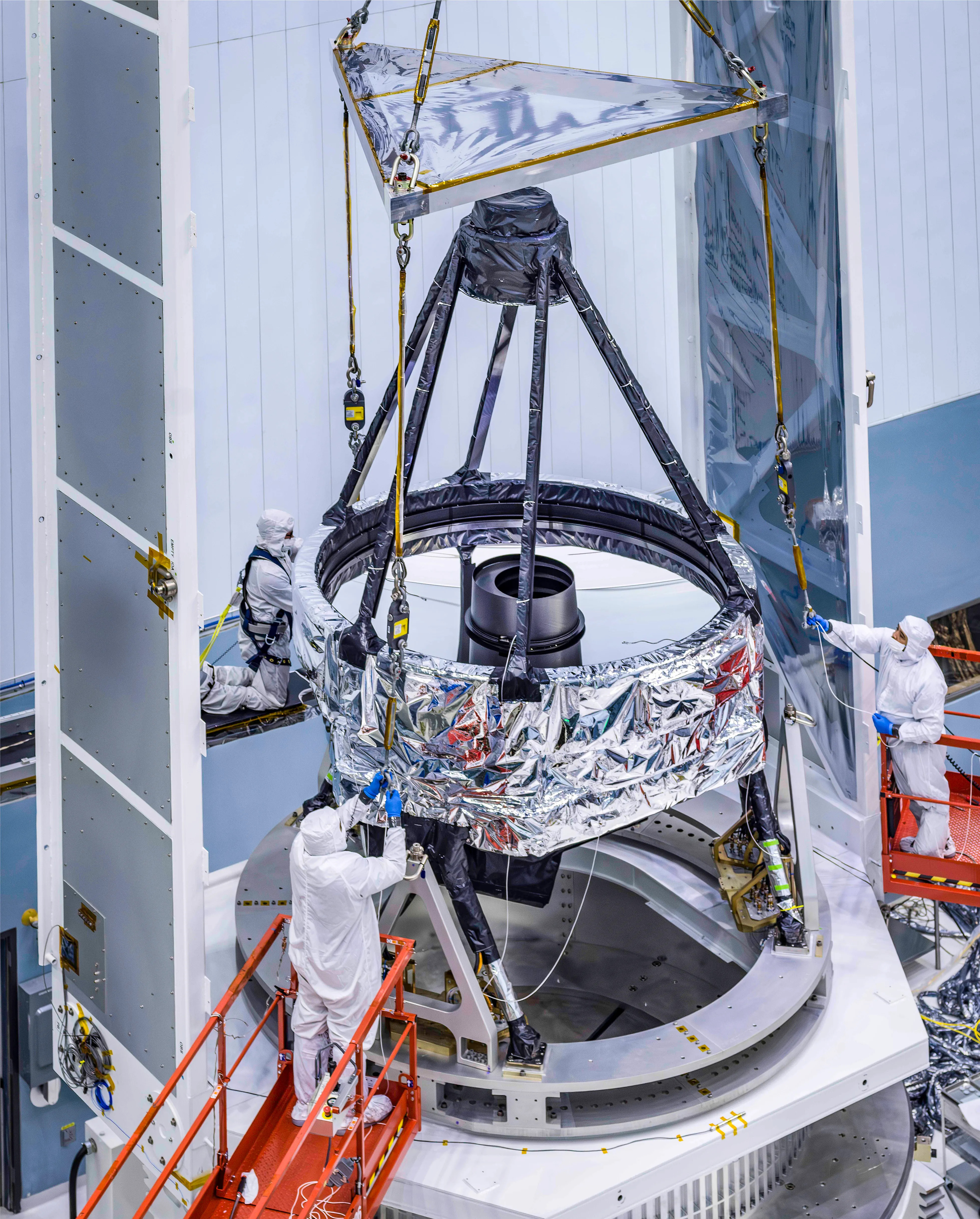
Optical Telescope Assembly

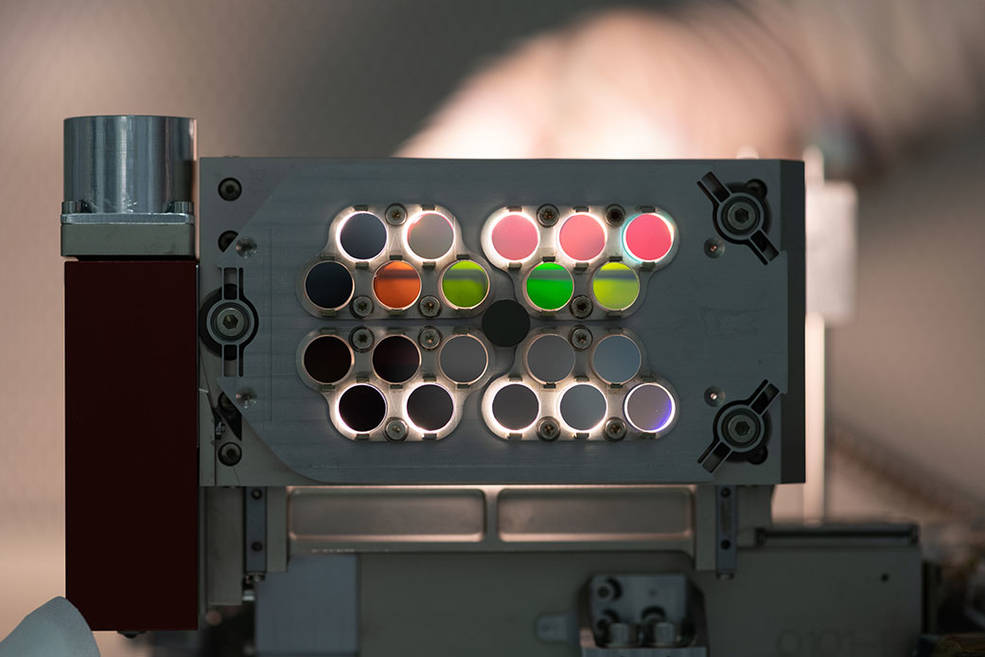
Coronagraph Instrument's color filter assembly

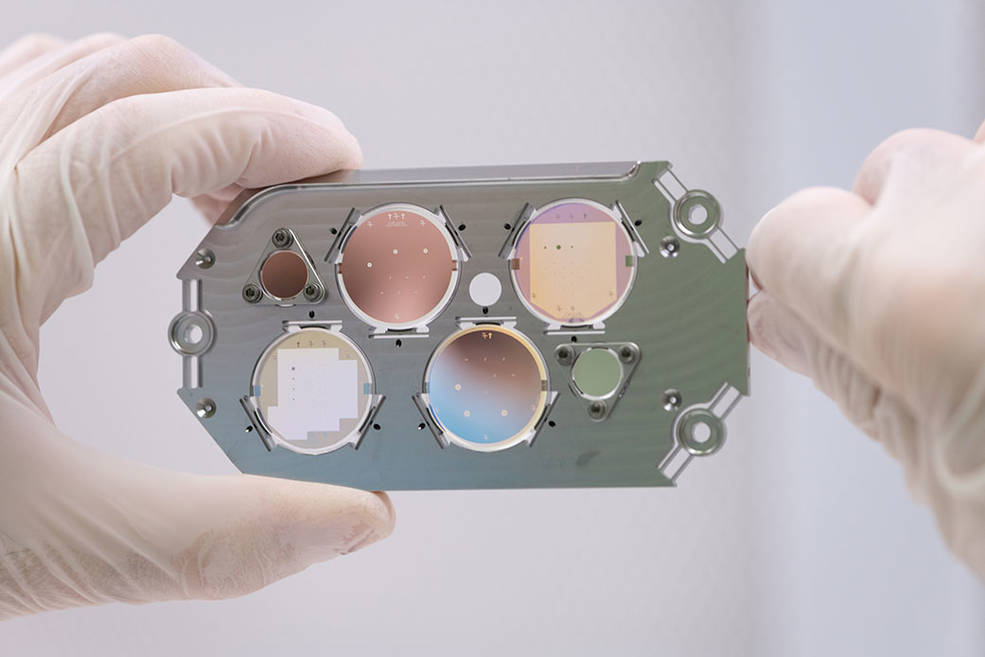
Coronagraph Instrument focal plane mask

== History ==
=== Origins ===
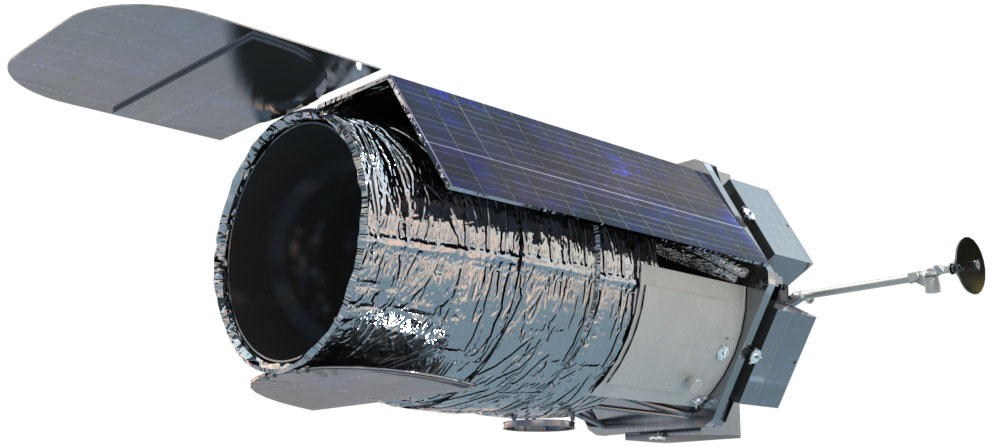
WFIRST-AFTA concept, 2013

The design of the Nancy Grace Roman Space Telescope shares a heritage with various proposed designs for the Joint Dark Energy Mission (JDEM) between NASA and the Department of Energy (DOE). The original design, called WFIRST (Wide-Field Infrared Survey Telescope) Design Reference Mission 1, was studied in 2011–2012, featuring a 1.3-meter (4 ft 3 in) diameter unobstructed three-mirror anastigmat telescope. It contained a single instrument, a visible to near-infrared imager/slitless prism spectrometer.

In 2012, another possibility emerged: NASA could use a second-hand National Reconnaissance Office (NRO) telescope made by Harris Corporation to accomplish a mission like the one planned for WFIRST. NRO offered to donate two telescopes, the same size as the Hubble Space Telescope but with a shorter focal length and hence a wider field of view. This provided important political momentum to the project, even though the telescope represents only a modest fraction of the cost of the mission and the boundary conditions from the NRO design had the potential to push the total cost over that of a fresh design. This mission concept, called WFIRST-AFTA (Astrophysics Focused Telescope Assets), was matured by a scientific and technical team; this mission is now the only present NASA plan for the use of the NRO telescopes. The Roman baseline design includes a coronagraph to enable the direct imaging of exoplanets.

Several implementations of WFIRST/Roman were studied. These included the Joint Dark Energy Mission-Omega configuration, an Interim Design Reference Mission and Design Reference Mission 1, both featuring a 1.3-meter (4 ft 3 in) telescope, Design Reference Mission 2 with a 1.1-meter (3 ft 7 in) telescope, and several iterations of the AFTA 2.4-meter (7 ft 10 in) configuration.

=== Formulation ===
In the fiscal year 2014, Congress provided US$56 million for Roman, followed by US$50 million in 2015. The fiscal year 2016 spending bill provided US$90 million for Roman, substantially more than NASA's request of US$14 million, allowing the mission to enter the "formulation phase" in February 2016. On 18 February 2016, NASA announced that Roman had formally transitioned from a study to a project, indicating its intent to proceed with the mission as baselined.

At that time, the "AFTA" portion of the mission concept name WFIRST-AFTA was dropped, as only that approach was being pursued with a plan for a mid-2020s launch. The total cost of Roman at that point was expected at more than US$2 billion. NASA's 2015 budget estimate was around US$2.0 billion in 2010 dollars, which corresponds to around US$2.7 billion in real year (inflation-adjusted) dollars.

In the 2015 final report, Roman was considered for both geosynchronous orbit and for an orbit around the Sun-Earth Lagrange point L_{2}. L_{2} has disadvantages versus geosynchronous orbit in available data rate and propellant required, but advantages for improved observing constraints, better thermal stability, and more benign radiation environment. Some science cases (such as exoplanet microlensing parallax) are improved at L_{2}, but the possibility of robotic servicing at either of the locations is currently unknown. By February 2016, it had been decided to use a halo orbit around L_{2}.

=== Development ===
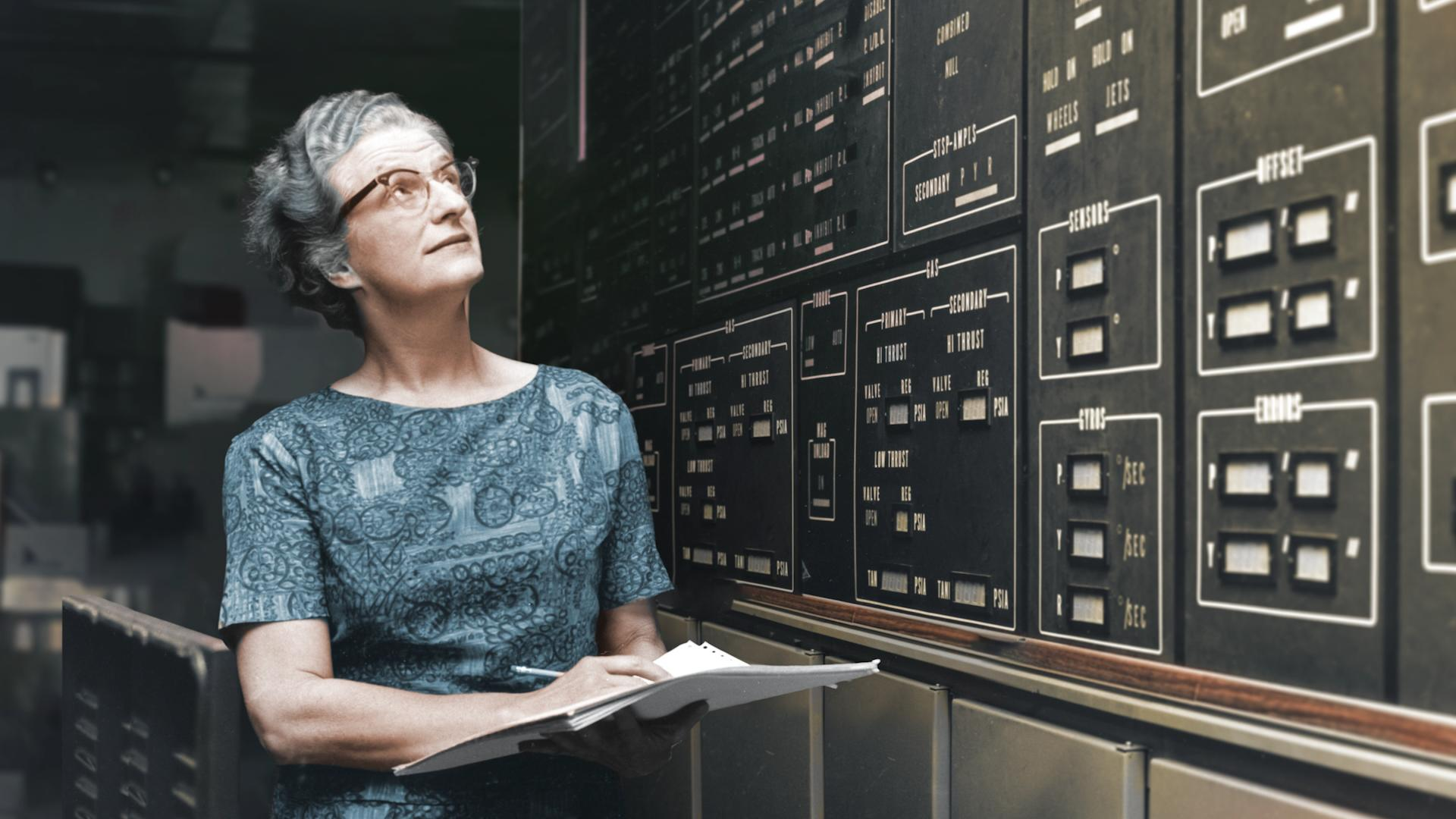
Dr. Nancy Grace Roman, NASA's first Chief of Astronomy, is shown at NASA's Goddard Space Flight Center in Greenbelt, Maryland, in approximately 1972.

A 3D model of the telescope, as of 2020

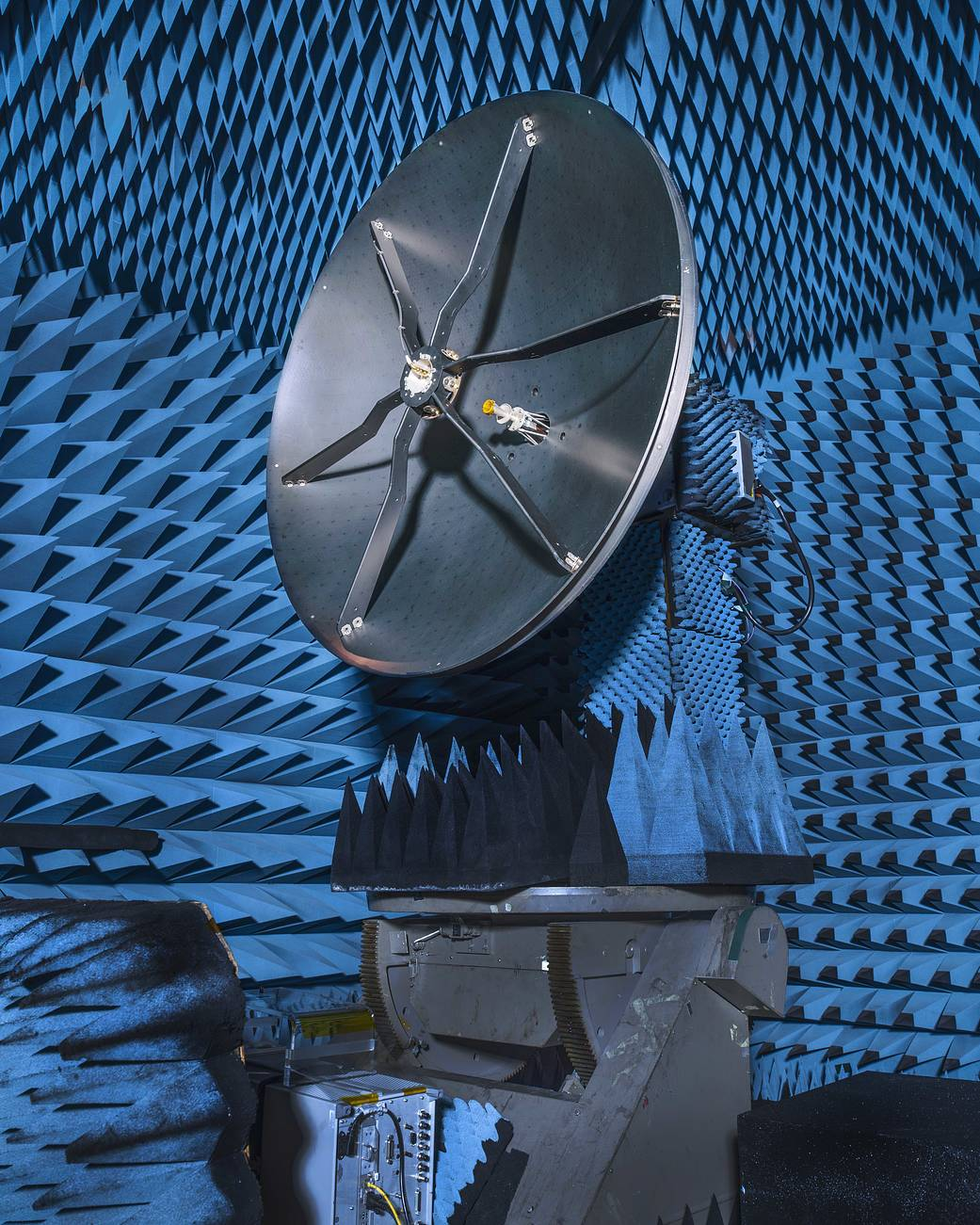
High-Gain Antenna for the Roman Space Telescope, 2023

The mission began Phase A development in 2016 with Neil Gehrels, as project scientist, chairing the Formulation Science Working Group with co-chairs Jeremy Kasdin and David Spergel. In April 2017, NASA commissioned an independent review of the project to ensure that the mission scope and cost were understood and aligned. The review acknowledged that Roman offers "groundbreaking and unprecedented survey capabilities for dark energy, exoplanet, and general astrophysics", but directed the mission to "reduce cost and complexity sufficient to have a cost estimate consistent with the US$3.2 billion cost target set at the beginning of Phase B".

In January 2018, NASA announced the reductions taken in response to this recommendation, and that Roman would proceed to its mission design review in February 2018 and begin Phase B by April 2018. NASA confirmed (March 2018) that the changes made to the project had reduced its estimated life cycle cost to US$3.2 billion and that the Phase B decision was on track to begin on 11 April 2018.

In February 2018, the Trump administration proposed an FY2019 budget that would have delayed the funding of the Roman (then called WFIRST), citing higher priorities within NASA and the increasing cost of the telescope. The proposed defunding of the project was met with criticism by professional astronomers, who noted that the American astronomical community had rated Roman the highest-priority space mission for the 2020s in the 2010 Decadal Survey. The American Astronomical Society expressed "grave concern" about the proposed defunding, and noted that the estimated lifecycle cost for Roman had not changed over the previous two years.

In agreement, the United States Congress approved an FY2018 Roman budget on 22 and 23 March 2018 in excess of the administration's budget request for that year, stating that it "rejects the cancellation of scientific priorities recommended by the National Academy of Sciences decadal survey process", and directed NASA to develop new estimates of Roman's total and annual development costs. The President of the United States announced he had signed the bill on 23 March 2018.

In May 2018, NASA awarded a multi-year contract to Ball Aerospace (now called BAE Systems Space & Mission Systems) to provide key components (the Opto-Mechanical Assembly) for the Wide-Field Instrument on Roman. In June 2018, NASA awarded a contract to Teledyne Scientific and Imaging to provide the infrared detectors for the Wide-Field Instrument. On 30 November 2018, NASA announced it had awarded a contract for the telescope. This was for a part called the Optical Telescope Assembly (OTA), and ran to 2025. This was in conjunction with the Goddard Space Flight Center, for which the OTA was planned for delivery as part of the contract.

NASA was funded via a FY2019 appropriations bill on 15 February 2019, with US$312 million for Roman, rejecting the President's reduced Budget Request and reasserting the desire for completion of Roman with a planning budget of US$3.2 billion.

A February 2019 description of the mission's capabilities is available in a white paper issued by members of the Roman team. In March 2019 the Trump administration again proposed to defund the Roman in its FY2020 budget proposal to Congress. In testimony on 27 March 2019, NASA Administrator Jim Bridenstine hinted that NASA would continue Roman after the James Webb Space Telescope, stating "WFIRST will be a critical mission when James Webb is on orbit". In a 26 March 2019 presentation to the National Academies' Committee on Astronomy and Astrophysics, NASA Astrophysics Division Director Paul L. Hertz stated that Roman "is maintaining its US$3.2 billion cost for now... We need US$542 million in FY2020 to stay on track". At that time, it was stated that Roman would hold its Preliminary Design Review (PDR) for the overall mission in October 2019 followed by a formal mission confirmation in early 2020.

NASA announced the completion of the Preliminary Design Review (PDR) on 1 November 2019, but warned that though the mission remained on track for a 2025 launch date, shortfalls in the Senate's FY2020 budget proposal for Roman threatened to delay it further.

On 2 March 2020, NASA announced that it had approved WFIRST to proceed to implementation, with an expected development cost of US$3.2 billion and a maximum total cost of US$3.934 billion, including the coronagraph and five years of mission science operations. On 20 May 2020, NASA Administrator Jim Bridenstine announced that the mission would be named the Nancy Grace Roman Space Telescope in recognition of the former NASA Chief of Astronomy's role in the field of astronomy.

In March 2021, the NASA Office of Inspector General (OIG) released a report that stated that the development of the telescope had been affected by the COVID-19 pandemic in the United States which had occurred during an acutely important time in its development. NASA was expecting a total impact of US$400 million due to the pandemic and its effect on subcontractors for the project.

On 29 September 2021, NASA announced that Roman had passed its Critical Design Review (CDR), and that with predicted impacts from COVID-19 disruptions, and with flight hardware fabrication completed by 2024 followed by mission integration, the launch date would be no later than May 2027. Via an agreement signed in June 2022, MPIA designed, built, and provided all of CGI's Precision Alignment Mechanisms (PAM) which operate, stabilize, and control optical elements such as optical filters. On 19 July 2022, NASA announced that Roman would be launched on a Falcon Heavy launch vehicle, with a contract specifying readiness by October 2026 and a launch cost of approximately $255 million.

=== Construction ===
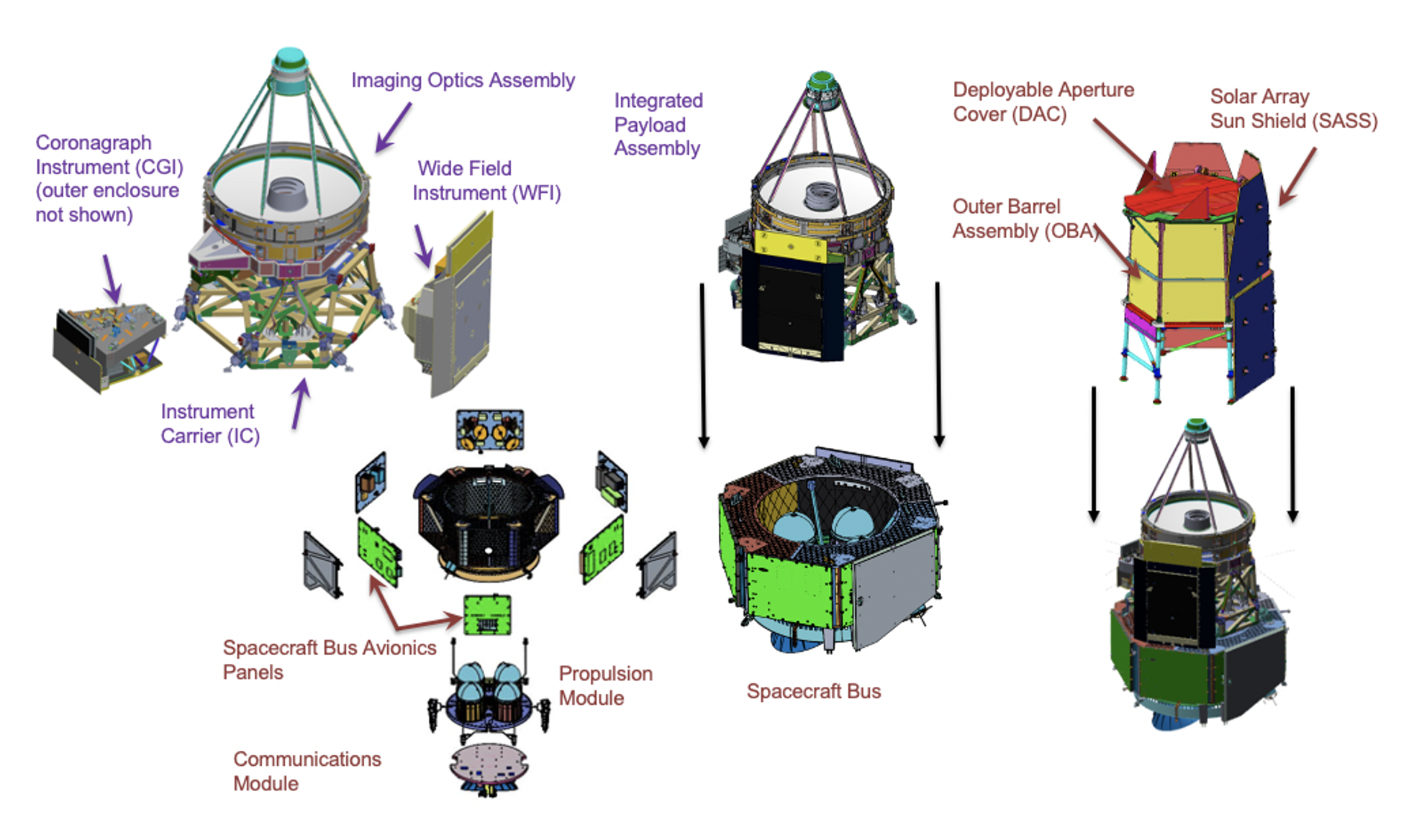
Roman Space Telescope structure

In September 2024, the satellite bus which would carry the telescope, was substantially completed. The following December, the instruments and mirror assembly were successfully integrated onto a section called the "instrument carrier". In October 2024, the telescope passed a major 'spin test'.

In April 2025, the second Trump administration proposed to cut funding for Roman again as part of its FY2026 budget draft. This was part of wider proposed cuts to NASA's science budget, down to US$3.9 billion from its FY2025 budget of US$7.5 billion. On 25 April 2025, the White House Office of Management and Budget announced a plan to cancel dozens of space missions, including the Roman Space Telescope, as part of the cuts. A revised budget released on 31 May 2025 did not include cancellation of the Roman Space Telescope.

During the 2025 federal government shutdown, NASA's Goddard Space Flight Center began closing multiple buildings and consolidating equipment, which the agency describes as a pre-planned "strategic consolidation" not expected to impact missions. A NASA spokesperson told CNN that work on the Nancy Grace Roman Space Telescope and the Dragonfly mission would continue during the shutdown as excepted operations. According to Space.com, some employees at the center expressed concern that the manner and timing of the closures could disrupt work on those projects, and CNN reported that an internal document compiled by Goddard staff cited potential impacts on specialized testing laboratories.

The telescope had finished construction on 25 November 2025. On 21 June 2026, the completed telescope arrived at the Kennedy Space Center, in preparation for launch. During final integration at Kennedy Space Center, in July 2026, technicians installed a commemorative plaque onto the telescope which holds a memory card containing 1,350,144 names submitted by the global public as part of a NASA public outreach campaign.

=== Launch ===
The telescope was launched as planned on 30 August 2026 at 11:26:04 UTC (7:26:04 AM EDT, local time at the launch site). Soon after separation from the launch vehicle, solar panels deployed and communications were established. On 31 August 2026, the telescope performed a 3-minute mid-course correction burn. On 1 September 2026, the telescope's antenna and sunshade successfully deployed and the Coronagraph Instrument was activated. The telescope will undergo a 90-day commissioning phase. It is expected to reach L2 after approximately 100 days or early December.

On 14 September 2026, NASA announced that the telescope has fuel for at least 22 years of scientific operations. NASA announced on 15 September 2026, activation of Wide Field Instrument (WFI) and stretched the Coronagraph instrument limbs after it was activated two weeks ago.

On 25 September 2026, NASA announced all ground stations were receiving data from the telescope. This included ESA's Australia ground station, JAXA's Misasa deep space station and NASA's Near Space Network in New Mexico. On 30 September 2026, NASA announced the guidance system was tested successfully and the Coronagraph took its first observation.

On 14 October 2026, NASA announced that it had checked the WFI and sharpened the telescope's focus. The WFI has an error of 63 nanometers RMS (Root Mean Square) against the expected 90 nanometers RMS, resulting in a 30% better performance than predicted by the Roman team.

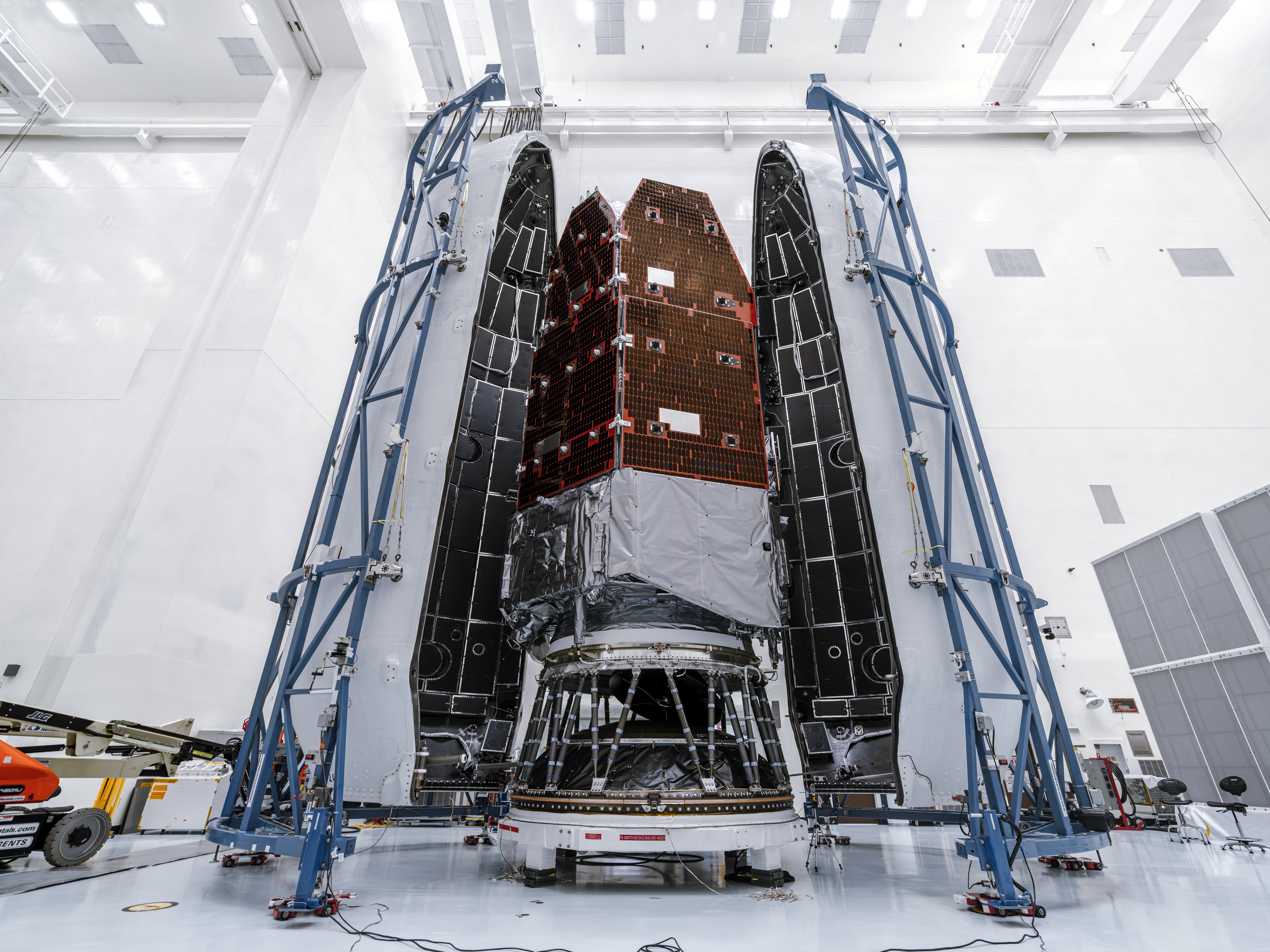
Roman's encapsulation in August 2026

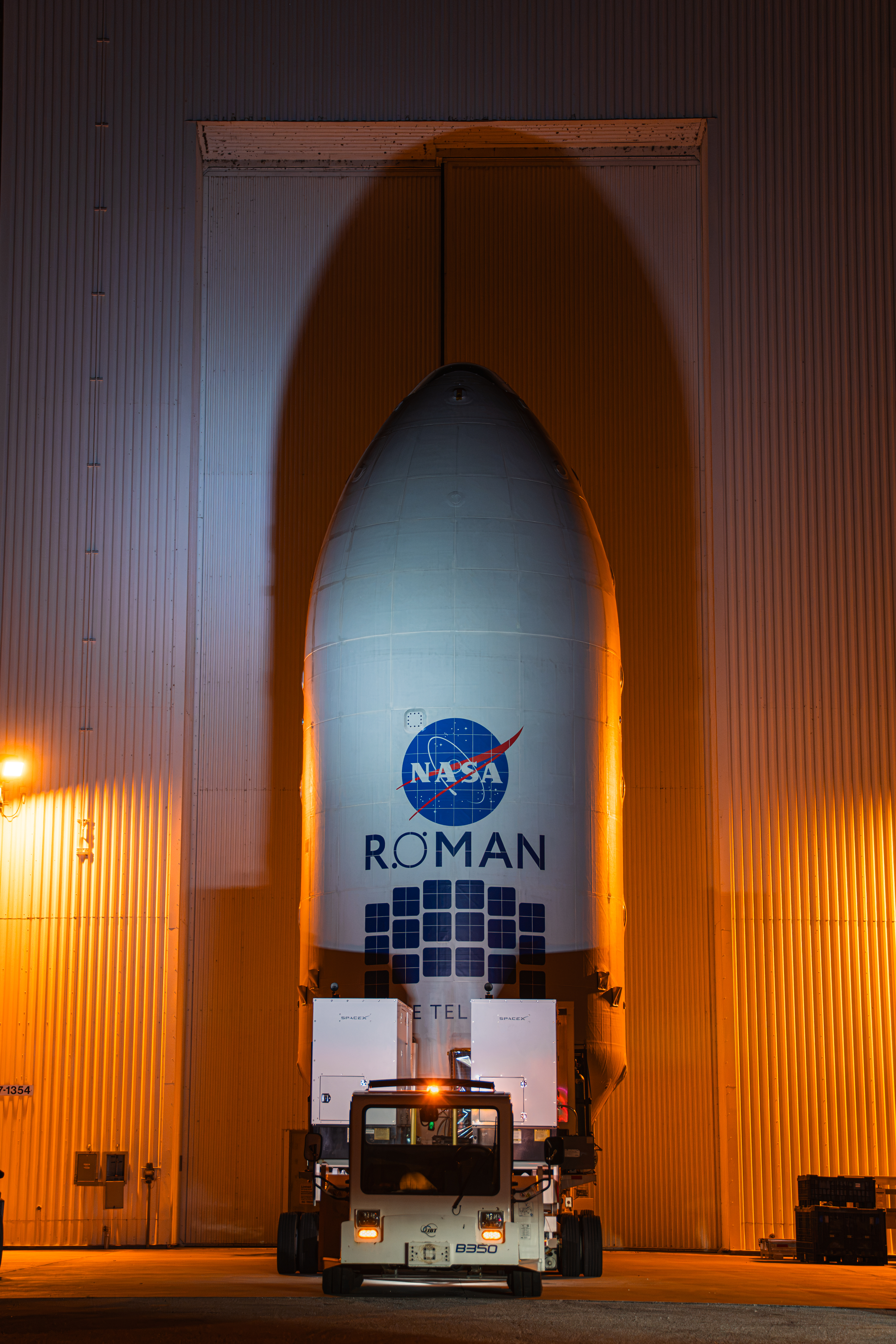
Roman, now inside a fairing, moving to LC-39A

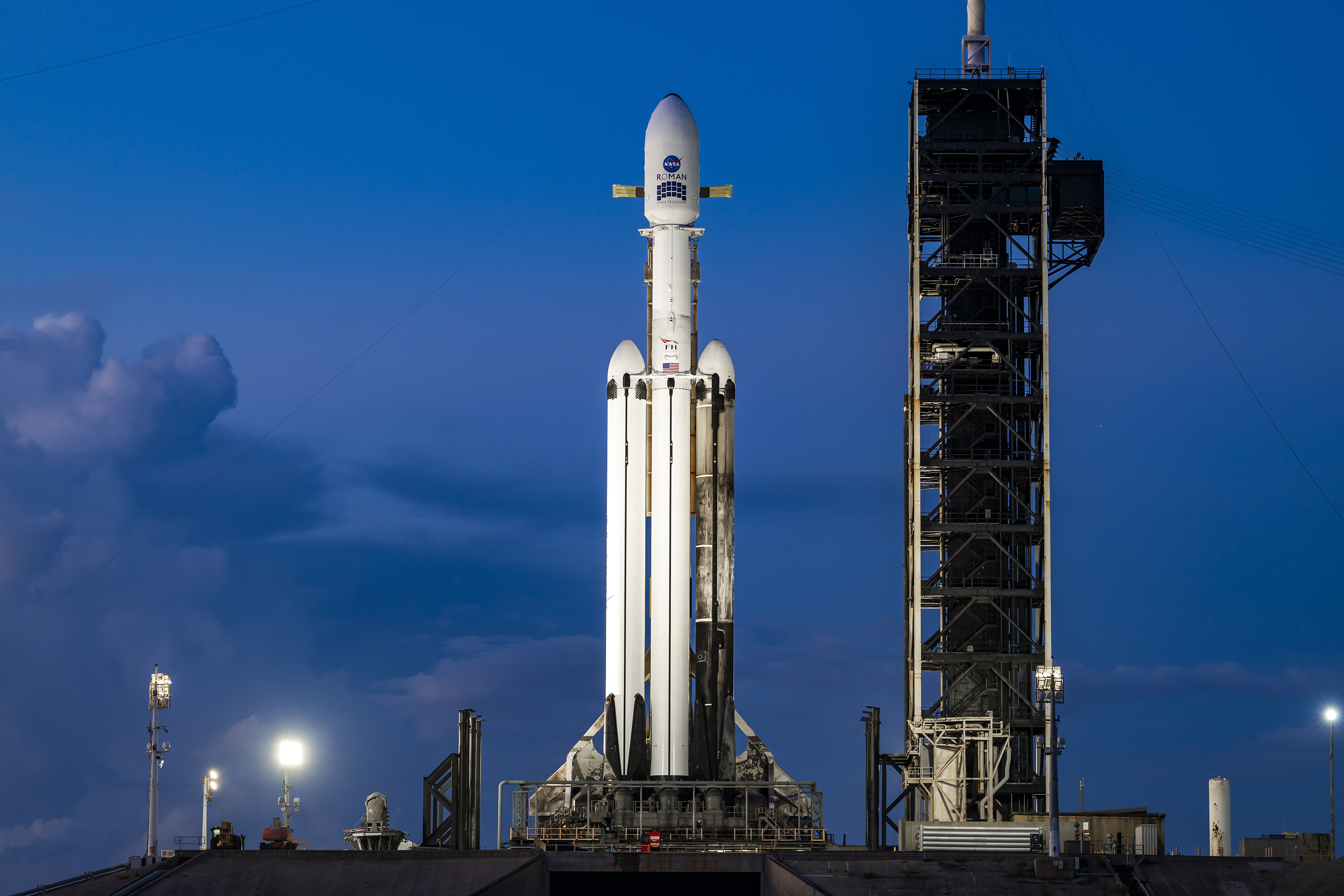
Falcon Heavy with Roman vertical at LC-39A

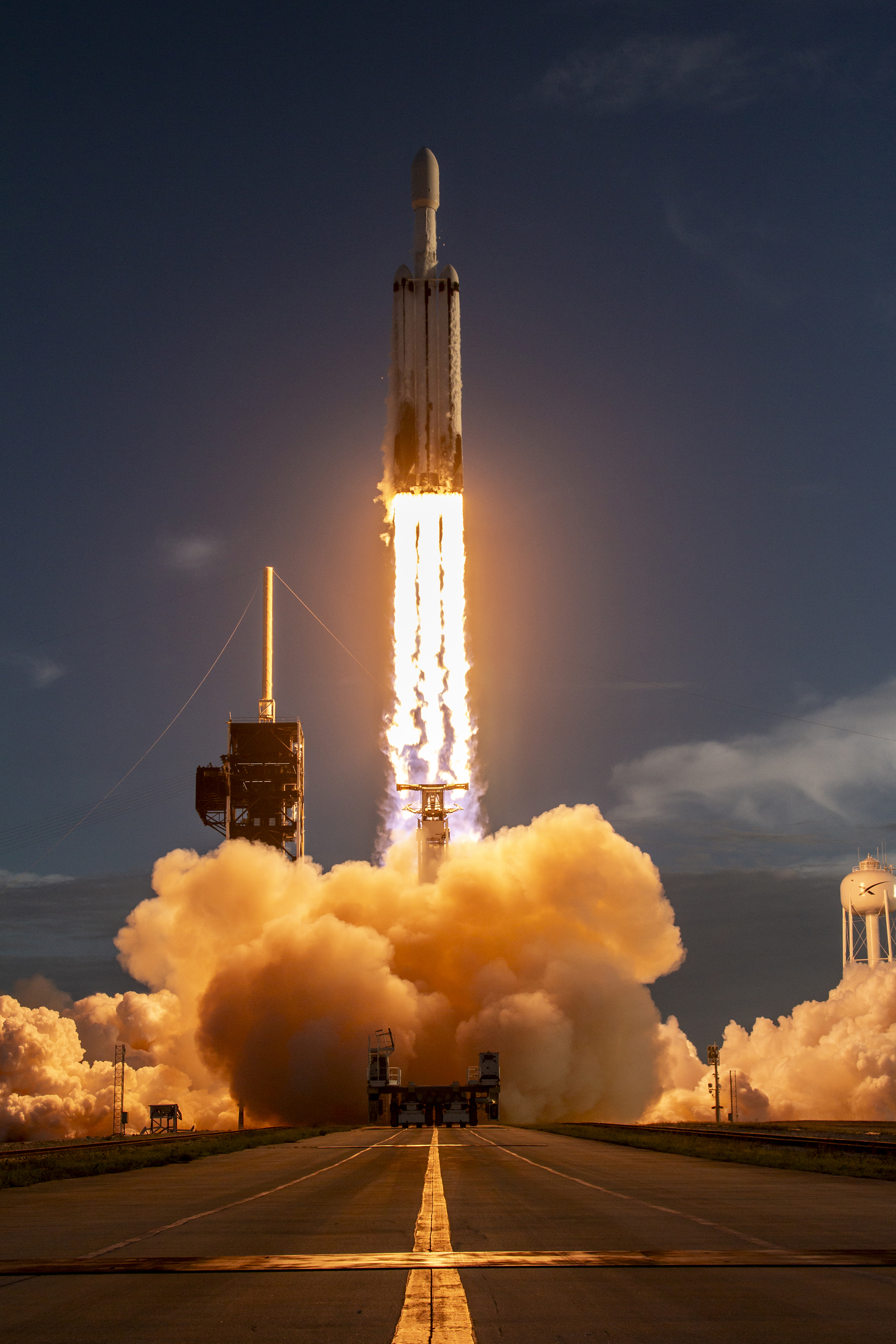
Falcon Heavy launching Roman

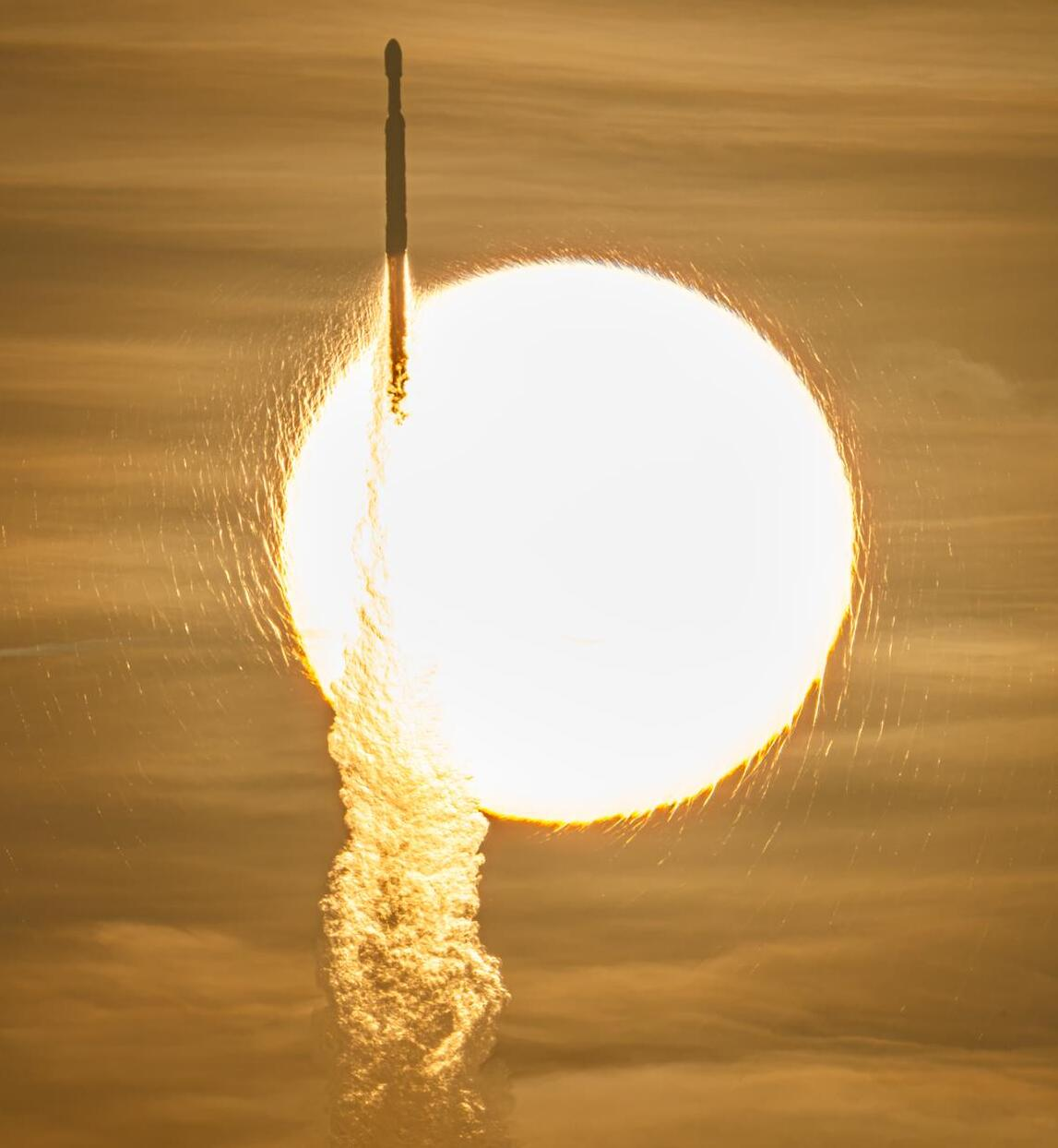
Falcon Heavy launching Roman, transiting the Sun

Visualization following Roman on its trajectory to L_{2}

== Partnerships ==
The Roman project office is located at NASA's Goddard Space Flight Center (GSFC) in Greenbelt, Maryland, and holds responsibility for overall project management. GSFC also leads the development of the Wide-Field Instrument, the spacecraft, and the telescope.

The Coronagraph Instrument was developed at NASA's Jet Propulsion Laboratory in Pasadena, California. Science support activities for Roman are shared among the Space Telescope Science Institute in Baltimore, Maryland, which is the Science Operations Center; the Infrared Processing and Analysis Center in Pasadena, California; and GSFC.

Four international partners, namely the French space agency CNES, European Space Agency (ESA), Japan Aerospace Exploration Agency (JAXA), and the Max Planck Institute for Astronomy have joined with NASA to provide various components and science support for Roman. Beginning in 2016 NASA expressed interest in ESA contributions to the spacecraft, coronagraph and ground station support. For the coronagraph instrument, contributions from Europe and Japan have been established. ESA contributed star trackers, batteries, and detectors for the instrument.

In 2018, a contribution from Germany's Max Planck Institute for Astronomy (MPIA) was under consideration, namely the filter wheels for the star-blocking mask inside the coronagraph. In 2016, the Japanese space agency JAXA proposed to add a polarization module for the coronagraph, plus a polarization compensator. An accurate polarimetry capability on Roman may strengthen the science case for exoplanets and planetary disks, which shows polarization. Ground support will be provided by a new NASA station in White Sands in New Mexico, the Misasa station in Japan and ESA's New Norcia station in Australia.

== Gallery ==
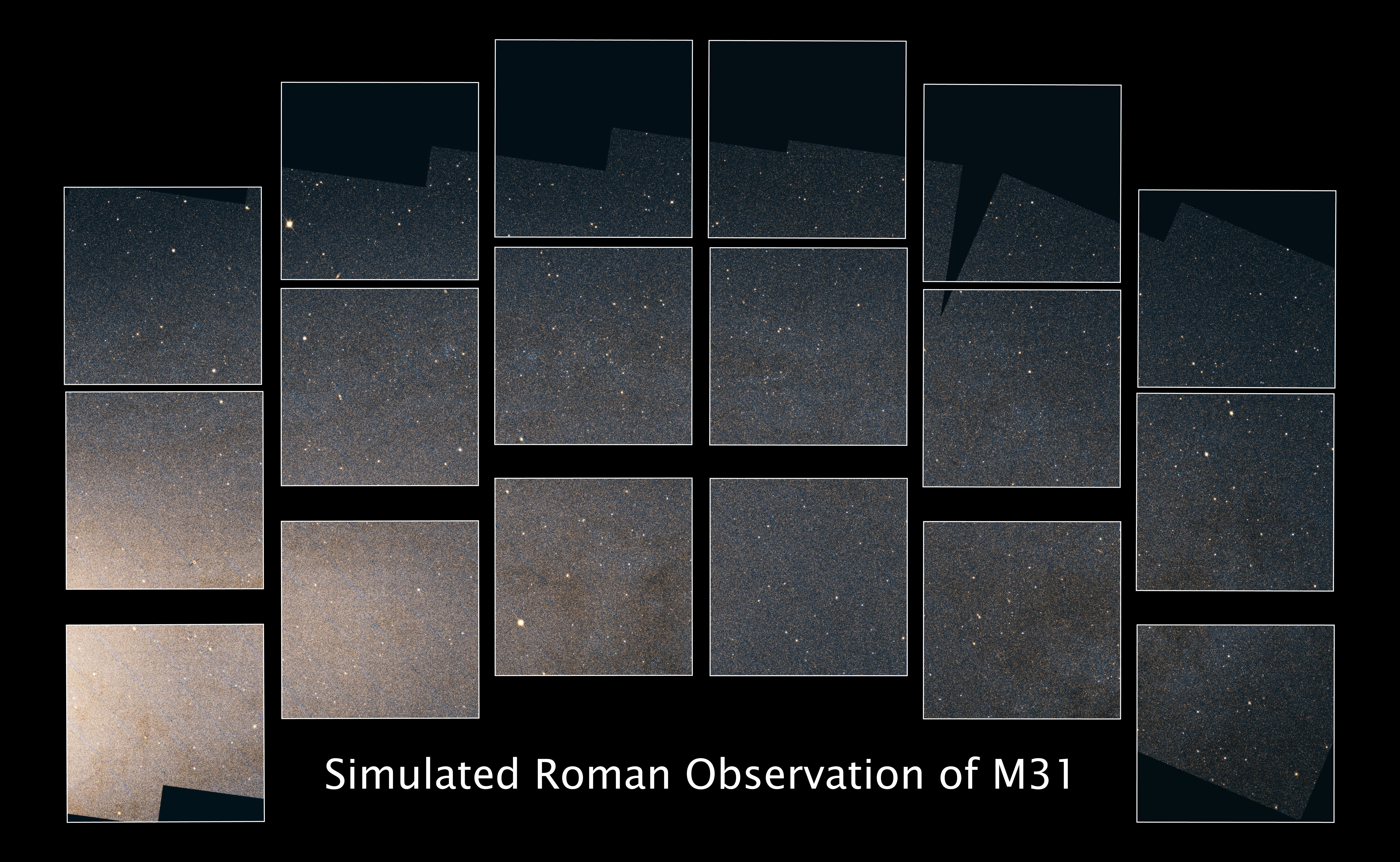
A simulated image of part of the Andromeda Galaxy

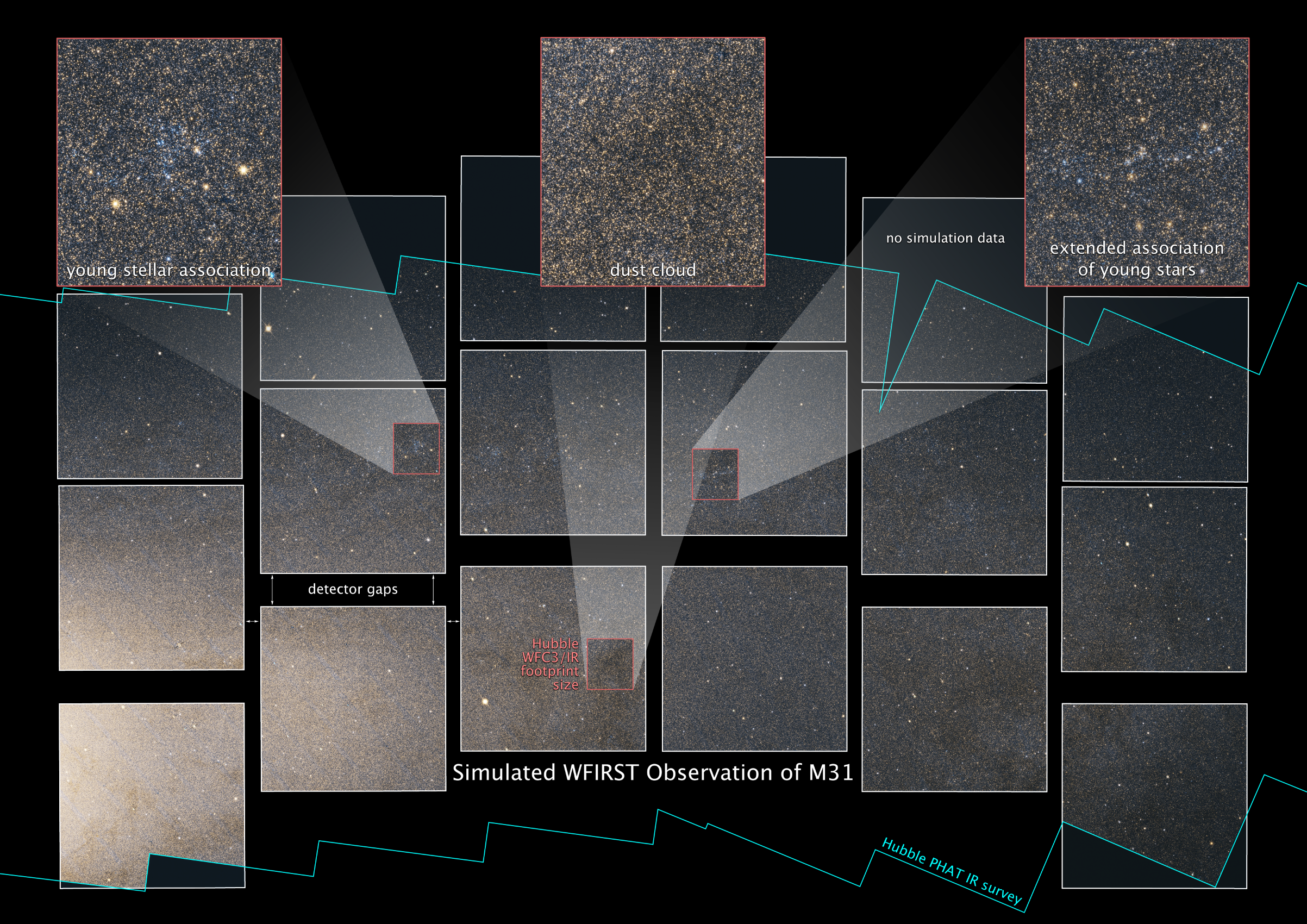
This simulated image showcases the red and infrared light of more than 50 million stars in Andromeda, as they would appear with WFIRST.

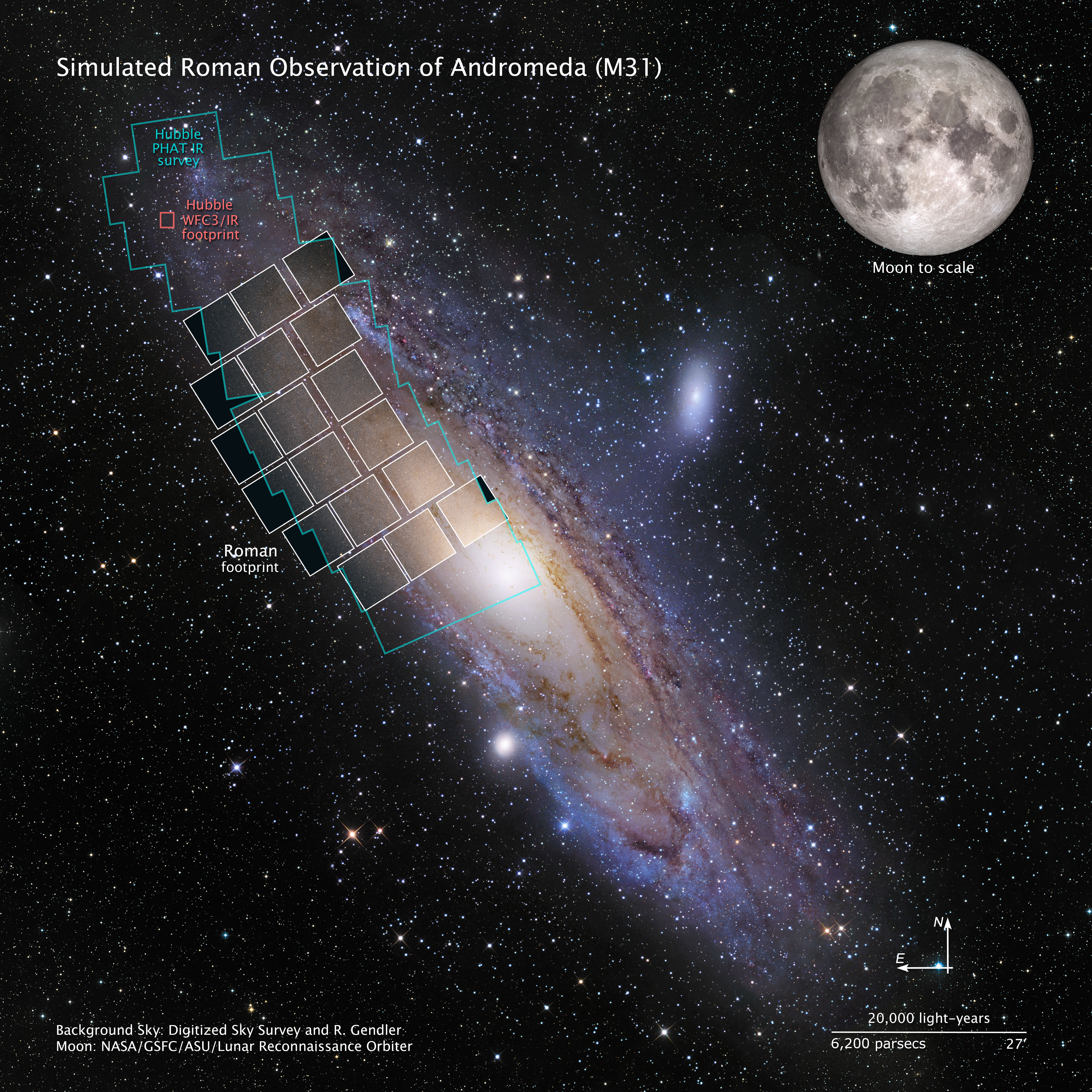
A composite figure shows the region of Andromeda covered by the Roman Space Telescope simulation. Roman would be able to image the main body of Andromeda in just a few pointings, surveying the galaxy nearly 1500 times faster than the Hubble Space Telescope.
Animation of Nancy Grace Roman Space Telescope

Around the Earth

Around the Sun – frame rotating with Earth – top view

Around the Sun – frame rotating with Earth – side view

Around the Sun – frame rotating with Earth – viewed from the Sun

Roman Space Telescope · Earth · Sun–Earth L2

=== First pictures ===
Test image by the Wide Field Instrument

The first test image was done with the Wide Field Instrument on 15 September 2026. It was taken as an initial performance assessment with the detector array still stowed as it was for launch, far from best focus. The image, which zooms into one detector and zooms again to a single star in the insets, offers a baseline the Roman team will work from to align the telescope's optics and tune the focus. The instrument's fine-guidance system will be activated after that, to allow Roman to lock onto targets. Then the telescope will be focused, and it will shrink each star's light to appear as a crisp point, rather than the broad, donut-like features seen on the test image. Roman's science images, which NASA expects to release by early 2027, will be much sharper.

== See also ==
- List of space telescopes
- James Webb Space Telescope – NASA/ESA/CSA infrared space telescope launched in 2021
- Spitzer Space Telescope – NASA infrared space telescope (2003–2020)
- Wide-field Infrared Survey Explorer – NASA satellite of the Explorer program
- Xuntian – Planned Chinese space telescope
