= Asher Space Research Institute =

Scientific research institute in Israel

Asher Space Research Institute מכון אשר לחקר החלל
- Established: 1984
- Mission: Advancing education, science, technology and engineering in all space related fields.
- Focus: Aerospace
- ASRI Director: Prof. Yoav Schechner
- Owner: Technion – Israel Institute of Technology
- Address: Technion city, Haifa, Israel
- Website: asri.institute

The Norman and Helen Asher Space Research Institute (ASRI) is a specialized research institute dedicated to multidisciplinary scientific research at Technion - Israel Institute of Technology, in Haifa, Israel.

ASRI was established in February, 1984. Its members come from a few Technion faculties, and it has a technical staff of Technion scientists in a variety of space-related fields (Physics, Aerospace Engineering, Mechanical Engineering, Electrical Engineering, Autonomous Systems and Computer Sciences). ASRI is a leading space research center in Israel and is involved in the development of space systems based on advanced and innovative technologies, as well as education through advanced degrees.

== History ==
Technion is Israel's oldest university, founded in 1912 to bring young people the technical skills they would need to build a nation. In the spirit of anticipating future needs, Technion established the faculty of Aeronautical Engineering in 1948. At the time, it was the only place in Israel teaching and researching aeronautics, and it has been credited in bringing the expertise to create the air force which guaranteed the survival on the young State of Israel. The Faculty evolved into today's Faculty of Aerospace Engineering at the Technion. Driven by a need for Israel to move into satellite technology in the 1980s, the Asher Space Research Institute was set up in 1984, four years before Israel formally rocketed into space with the launch of the Ofeq-1 satellite in 1988. Today, ASRI is the only center of higher education for space research in Israel.

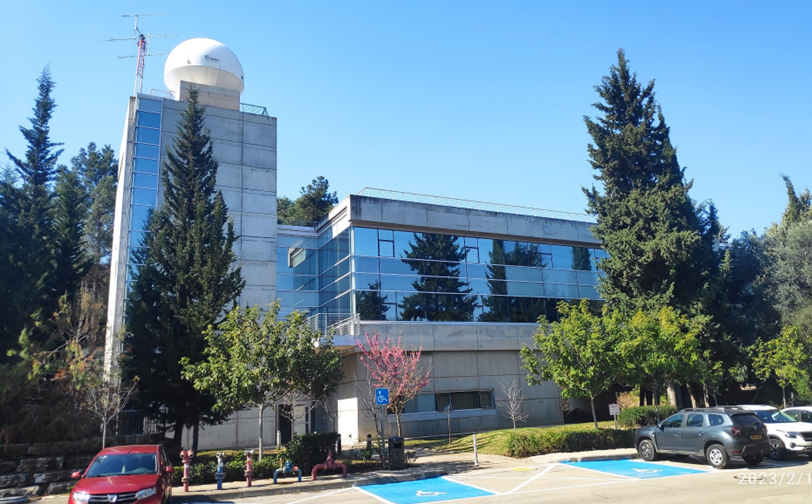
The ASRI Building at 'Technion-Israel Institute of Technology'

On February 12, 2009, the Norman and Helen Asher Space Building was dedicated at the Technion-Israel Institute of Technology in Haifa. Chicago resident Helen S. Asher and her late husband Norman provided the $3.5 million lead gift for the building. The occasion also celebrated the 30-year anniversary of Israel's space program. The institute is today managed by ASRI Director Prof. Yoav Schechner.

== ASRI Mission ==
ASRI's stated mission is to expand the frontiers of space research; investigate the Cosmos and Earth; combine innovations in science and technology; foster collaboration with industry and academia worldwide; and to promote scientific and technological education.

== Selected laboratories ==
In parallel to system development activities, members of the Institute technical staff perform, in collaboration with faculty members, research in various space related fields.

=== The Distributed Space Systems Laboratory (DSSL) ===
The Distributed Space Systems Laboratory (DSSL) is focused on dynamics and control of multiple spacecraft formation flying. The experimental facility is designed and equipped to test methods and machinery under circumstances as close to actual operating conditions as possible, including cooperative control, relative position and attitude sensing and space-borne sparse-aperture imaging. The lab includes an air bearing table, model satellites, and sensing devices. ASRI DSSL is currently working towards the launch of a formation flying mission into an Earth orbit.

=== Electric Propulsion ===
ASRI's research into electric propulsion of small satellites has culminated in the creation of the patented CAMILA, cited as the most efficient and effective rocket propulsion engine for space-craft and satellites. Working in collaboration with Israel's Soreq National Research Laboratory and RAFAEL, ASRI's Electric Propulsion laboratory is said to be pioneering the next generation of small thrusters. The lab is headed by Prof. Alexander Kapulkin, a rocket scientist from the former Soviet Union.

=== Laboratory for Space Interferometry (LaSI) ===
The Laboratory for Space Interferometry (LaSI) at the Asher Space Research Institute seeks solutions for improving the angular resolution of telescopes for both astronomical and Earth observations from space.

== Education ==
ASRI's educational activities include topical lectures for engineering students, supervision of undergraduate students space projects, and of graduate research theses'. One example of ASRI's educational initiatives was the DUSAT project. This consists of two identical Low Earth Orbit (LEO) microsatellites designed for simultaneous three-dimensional mapping. A current example is SABRES: a constellation of microsatellites for automated meter reading and other non-real time communication services. In addition to undergraduate and graduate degrees, ASRI has opportunities for postdoctoral research positions and frequently hosts international scientists.

== Gurwin TechSat ==
Gurwin TechSat was one of the world's first microsatellites to be designed, built and launched by students. Operations of TechSat II, also known as TechSat-1b and Gurwin-TechSAT-2, ceased in April 2010 when deterioration of its solar cells reduced power output so that the nominal performance of the satellite systems could no longer be supported. In the early 1990s, the Technion proposed building three or four small satellites for continuous early warning coverage. The TechSat Gurwin I was named in honour of Joseph and Rosalind Gurwin, whose interest and support of Israeli space research enabled its development. The flight model was completed in October 1994, but the first TechSat, also known as TechSat-1a, was lost when its Soviet converted ICBM Start launch vehicle failed. On 10 July 1998, the next microsatellite in the series, TechSat/Gurwin II, was successfully launched by Zenit 2 from Baikonur Cosmodrome.

The Asher Space Research Institute (ASRI) at Technion managed and conducted TechSat II operations from the university-based station. The solar cells used thin-film photovoltaic cell technology developed in Russia; they were mounted on four of the six outer aluminium panels. The box-shaped TechSat II carried six instruments to perform a range of experiments. Operations of TechSat II ceased in April 2010 when deterioration of its solar cells reduced power output so that the nominal performance of the satellite systems could no longer be supported. The mission has been said to demonstrate that a reduction of the satellite mass, size, and power consumption can be achieved without deterioration of its basic characteristics, such as mission life, payload efficiency and measurements precision.

== Education and outreach ==
=== Ilan Ramon Space Team Program ===
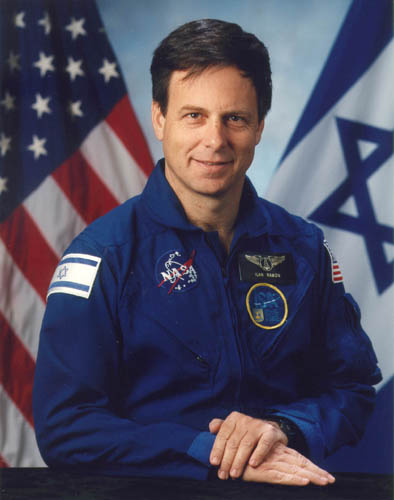
Colonel Ilan Ramon, Israeli astronaut killed during the failed re-entry of the Space Shuttle Columbia.

In 2002, ASRI set up the Ilan Ramon Space Club, in collaboration with the Jerusalem-based Society for Excellence in Education. After the tragic loss of the Columbia Shuttle and its crew, the space club was renamed in honor of Ilan Ramon - Israel's first astronaut. Ramon had conducted experiments in space designed by high school students and commissioned by ASRI and Israel's Ministry of Education. The club today consists of 12 nationwide groups of 20 high school students each. ASRI researchers prepare the syllabus for the clubs which are run with the help of Technion undergraduates.

=== Science and communication ===
Part of ASRI's global outreach drive involves a social media initiative to educated and inform the general public about space research in general and projects at Technion's ASRI in particular.
