= N. Jeremy Kasdin =

N. Jeremy Kasdin is an American astrophysicist pursuing research into the detection and characterization of exoplanetary systems. He is the assistant dean of the engineering school at the University of San Francisco. Prior to this, he was a professor at Princeton University and vice dean of the School of Engineering and Applied Sciences. He is a pioneer of the starshade technique for suppressing starlight to enable the direct detection of Earth-like planets around nearby stars. He is also a recognized authority on orbital dynamics and optimal estimation of physical state, and co-authored the book "Engineering Dynamics: A Comprehensive Introduction". His earlier work included involvement with NASA's Terrestrial Planet Finder mission, a mission studied in the 2000s; an innovative concept for a planet-finding telescope with an unusual pupil, and Gravity Probe B. Kasdin has also been involved with developing a means of tracking birds or other migratory animals anywhere in the world.

He is currently the leader of the coronagraph science (the Adjutant Scientist) for NASA's Nancy Grace Roman Space Telescope mission. Kasdin's work on shaped pupil coronagraphy, one of the techniques being developed for Roman, has demonstrated high contrast imaging over a restricted field of view near a bright object such as a star.
