= Technion Faculty of Aerospace Engineering =

- הפקולטה להנדסת אוירונוטיקה וחלל
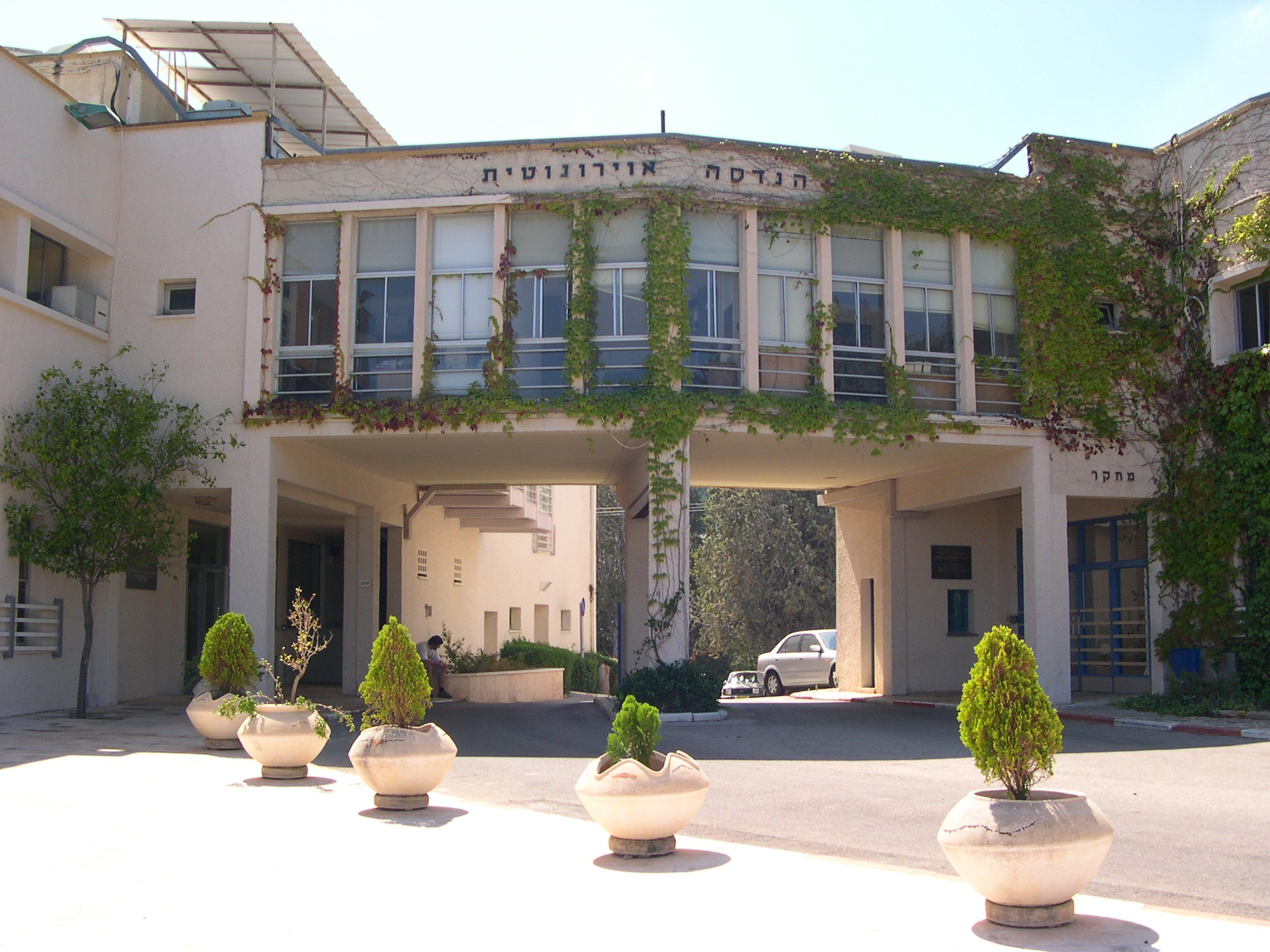
- Established: 1954
- Dean: Gil Iosilevskii
- Location: Haifa, Israel
- Website: https://aerospace.technion.ac.il

The Technion Faculty of Aerospace Engineering is a division of the Technion that conducts research and teaching in a wide range of aerospace disciplines. The faculty was founded in 1954.

== History ==
The early 1950s sought a need for a center of aeronautical research in Israel. In 1950, Sydney Goldstein accepted the chairmanship of the department of mathematics at Technion. The faculty was established in 1954 after Goldstein persuaded the President of the Technion, Yaakov Dori, and Prime Minister David Ben Gurion. The department expanded and developed rapidly, along with the development of the aerospace industry in Israel. After the Six-Day War, the faculty expanded and increased its research in airborne systems in affiliation with Rafael Advanced Defense Systems.

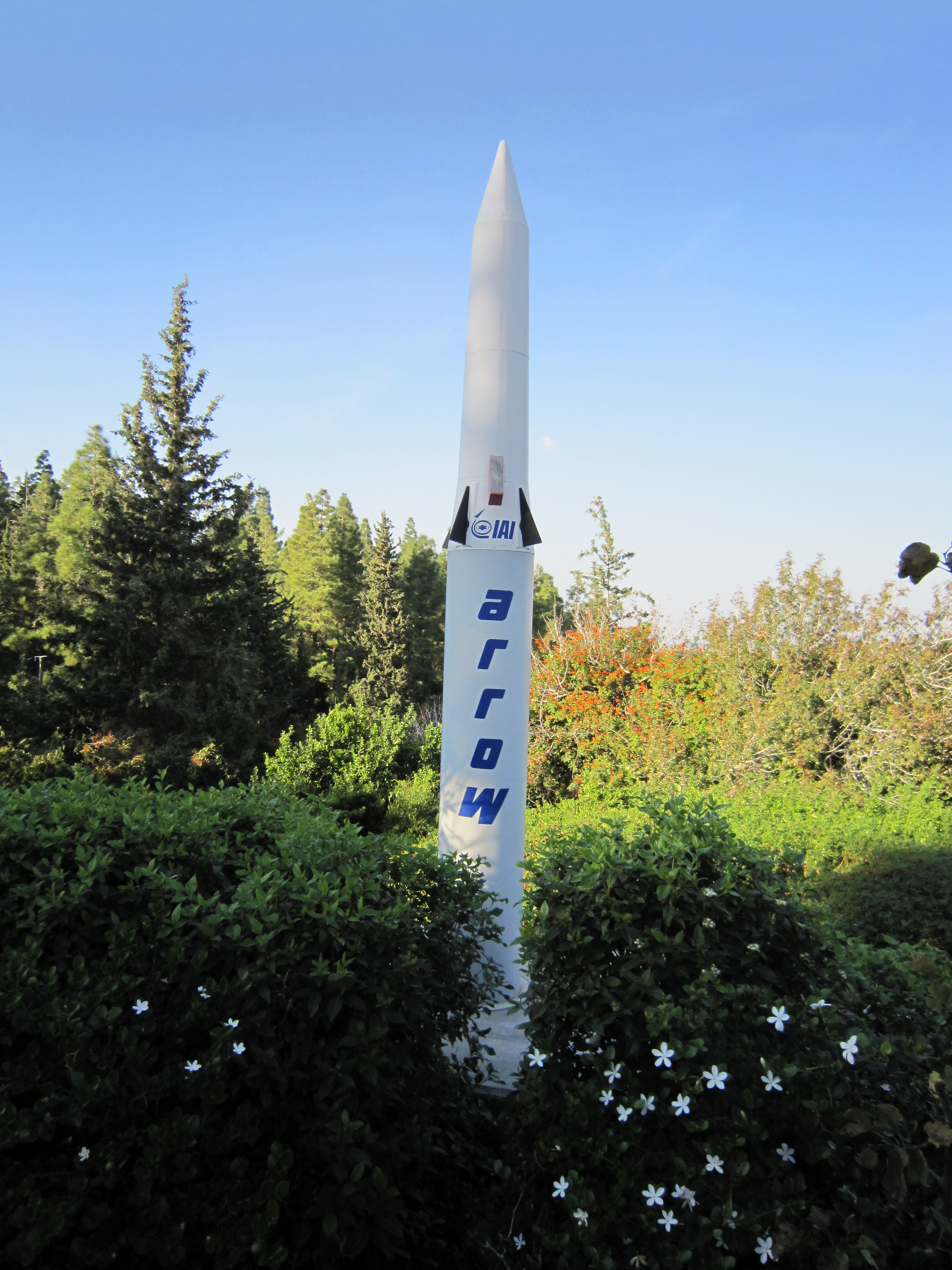
A model of the Arrow, located near the Faculty of Aerospace Engineering

== Facilities ==
The Aerospace Research Center consists of an Aerodynamics Laboratory, an Aerospace Structures Laboratory, a Combustion and Rocket Propulsion Laboratory, a Turbo and Jet Engine Laboratory, a Flight Control Laboratory, and the Design for Manufacturing Laboratory.

== Ranking ==
The Technion Faculty of Aerospace Engineering was ranked 8th in the world by the Shanghai Global ranking in 2017.

== See also ==
- Asher Space Research Institute
- Technion – Israel Institute of Technology
