= History of the Technion – Israel Institute of Technology =

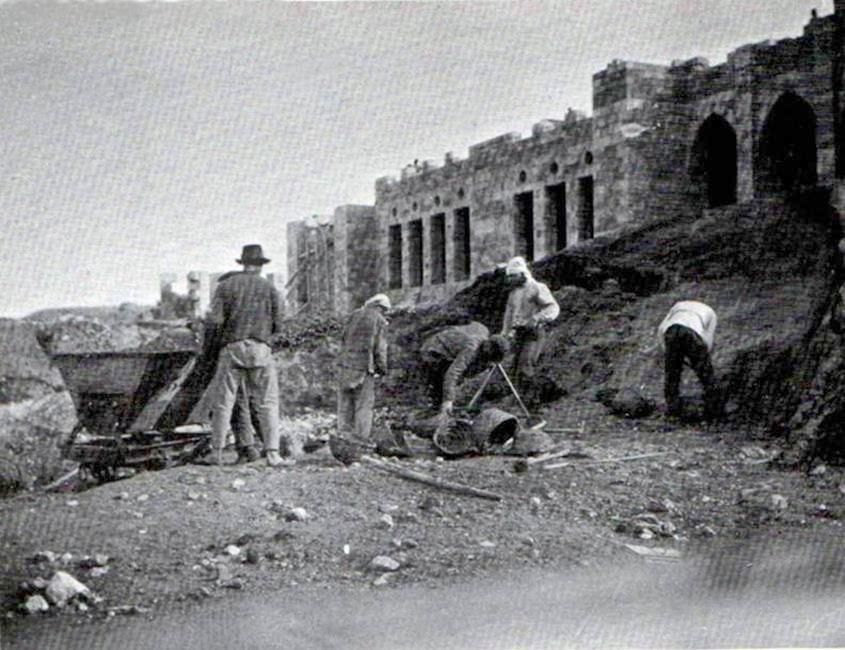
Construction of the Technion, 1912

The Technion – Israel Institute of Technology is a leading technical university in Haifa, Israel, with a history dating back to the early 20th century.

== Overview ==
The Technion logo

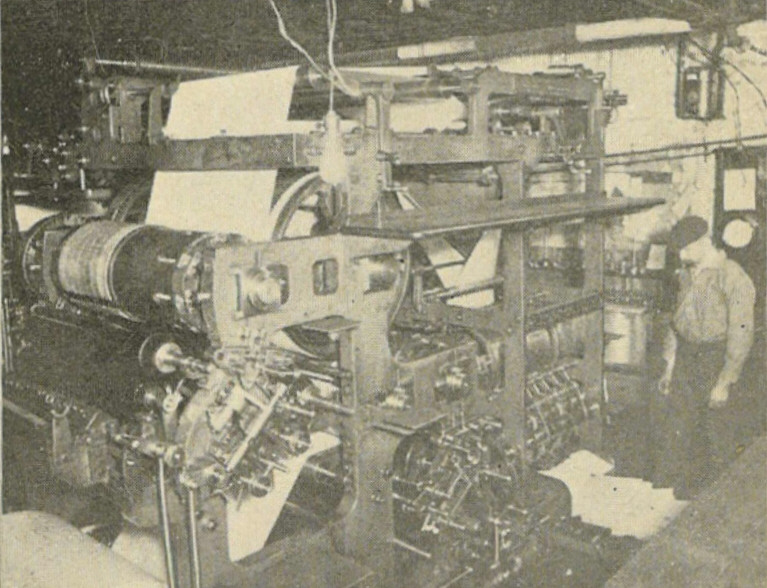
New means of communication with big printing presses opened new possibilities for early Zionists.

Initiated with the help of increasing Jewish unity made possible by the new communication technologies of the Second Industrial Revolution, the Technion – Israel Institute of Technology educated the engineers and brought the expertise to lay the infrastructure for the modern Israeli state. This included the fundamental infrastructure of electricity, water supplies and roads.

According to a leading British journalist, the Technion story is exemplary for other groups caught in the seemingly impossible task of creating an independent nation: "For more than two decades before the state was created, Technion (Israel Institute of Technology) helped to lay the foundations of the modern state of Israel. The identity of the country as a player in the field of science and technology can be traced to the vision of Technion."

Technion would grow rapidly, becoming a global pioneer in biotechnology, satellite research, computer science, nanotechnology and energy. In 2004, Technion professors won Israel's first Nobel Prizes in science. In 2011, Distinguished Prof. Dan Shechtman became Technion's third Nobel Laureate in Chemistry, for his discovery of quasicrystals, or Shechtmanite. It celebrated its cornerstone centennial in 2012 with 12,850 students and 80 graduate programs. In 2011, Technion partnered with Cornell University to submit a winning proposal to New York City to set up the Technion Cornell Institute of Innovation (TCII) on Roosevelt Island.

=== First plans ===
From the outset, the Zionist movement had a vision of the creation of a Jewish University in the historic land of Israel. Jews were often barred from technical or scientific training, and these skills and a grounded education in engineering were seen as a key to building a Zionist nation.

In 1902, Theodor Herzl envisioned Haifa as "a great park....with an overhead electrical train.... a city of magnificent homes and public institutions all made possible by applied science, engineering and technology." (Altneuland) Herzl infused political Zionism with a new and practical urgency. By the fifth Zionist congress at the Stadtcasino Basel in Switzerland in 1901, the pressure was on to found a number of cultural institutions and a resolution was adopted for a "fundamental survey of the question of founding a Jewish university."

A group of three young men in their twenties: Martin Buber of Vienna, student of philosophy and Zionist; Berthold Feiwel of Berlin – political writer and editor and Chaim Weizmann – formed a caucus emphasizing the need for a Jewish university with a first objective of education in technology. They produced a document pointing out the difficulties of Jewish youth who sought admission to universities where they lived. The lack of opportunities for technical studies, they wrote, was much more serious for Jewish students than in other studies. The problem was "eminiently economic and social". It meant that in Russia, the Jews were practically excluded from technical professions with the result that they were pushed into commercial occupations.

The plan was to set up a preparatory Technikum, in part to train students for the university and in part to serve as an independent institution for the training of young people in technical, agricultural and similar professions. Graduates would be the basis for establishing and maintaining a Jewish industry.

In 1903, 60,000 Jews of Palestine had just held elections for the first national democratic assembly, the grandfather of the present Knesset (Israel's parliament). It was called the Knessiah Rishonah (1st assembly). This gathering was special as a first grass-roots attempt to set up the structures of Jewish self-government. Zionist leader Dr. Menahem Ussishkin used the occasion to deliver a keynote address in which he expressed the urgency for an institution of higher education in Palestine. The convention supported a resolution for the establishment of a polytechnical institute in Palestine and the Technion – Israel Institute of Technology (at least on paper) was born.

Paul Nathan of the Hilfsverein der deutschen Juden ("Relief Organization of German Jews"), played a central role in bringing together diverse Jewish groups under the Technikum umbrella, and in raising resources.

=== First funds ===
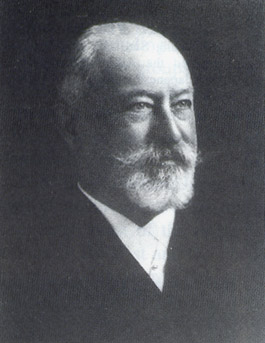
Founder Jacob Schiff was determined to ensure that the Technion would maintain its independence

The Russian tea merchant Kalonymous Zeev Wissotzky left all his holdings in the family business, approximately 1 million rubles, to philanthropic causes. Among the executors was Ahad Ha-Am, the distinguished Zionist philosopher. Ahad Ha-Am was able to recruit Wissotsky's son David to the Technikum plan, and a first contribution of 100,000 rubles was made.

In 1908, the American philanthropist Jacob Schiff was visiting the "holy land". Schiff was affected by the poverty and destitution he found among many of the Jews of Palestine and was inspired by the idea of an institution that would provide technical training.

Back in Europe, interest in the new Technikum was kept high. In 1909 Dr. Chaim Weizmann, who would later become President of the State of Israel, reported to a Zionist conference in Manchester that things were going well with the "National Polytecnikum". Wealthy Jews from many lands were already promising generous support.

=== Choice of Haifa ===
A campaign was mounted by the Jewish community in Jerusalem to host the Technikum, and a special committee was set up to put forward a case for Jerusalem. The case for Haifa proved stronger, and in the end won the day:

- Haifa was destined to be the city of the future ... a great port center of industry and shipping. With the building of the Hedjaz railroad, it would be linked to Damascus and Baghdad and would become an important crossroads for land transport as well.
- The local Jewish community was not yet rigid in its organization and character, unlike Jerusalem, the center of Orthodoxy; or Jaffa, which was a hotbed of Jewish nationalism. The neutrality of Haifa would minimize conflicts, they argued.
- The local Jewish community was small, and its influence hardly felt in the city. The Technikum would give impetus to the expansion and growth of the Jewish population in the North.

== 1912: first cornerstone ==
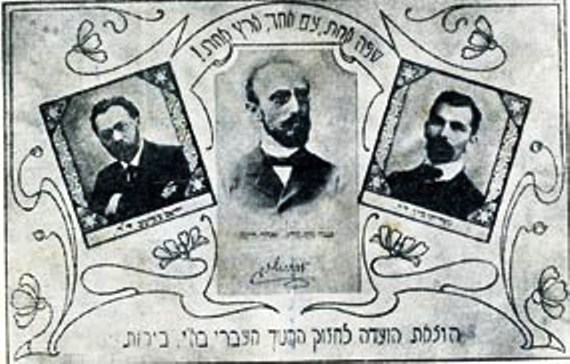
Flyer advocates the use of Hebrew

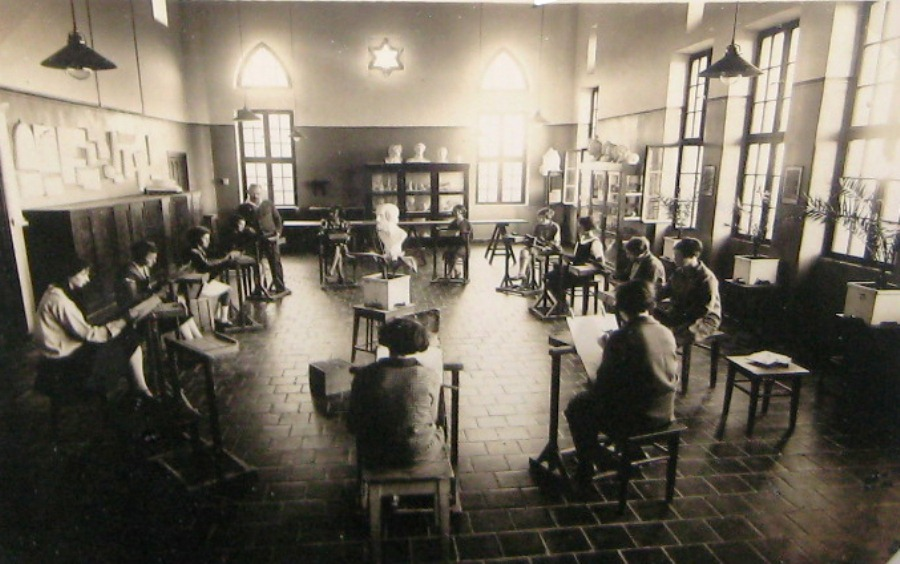
Architecture students at Technion (1920s)

In October 1909, Prussian Jewish architect Alexander Baerwald was asked to come up with a first plan for the new building. This architect – who used to play cello in a string quartet with Albert Einstein – was inspired by the idea of blending European form with Eastern elements. His design was approved by the Kuratorium, and in August 1910, Baerwald was assigned to draw up the detailed plans and supervise the execution. Aside from the stone, most of the other building material came from abroad. The lime was from France, the cement from Germany. Plumbing installations and various fixtures also came from Europe and to this day, visitors at the historic building can read the German manufacturers' inscriptions on floor plates and elsewhere in the building.

Digging of the well also created problems. First attempts could only reach 40 meters, at which point work was suspended due to a lack of skilled labor. A special permit to import the required dynamite was acquired, but it was only when a foreign expert was brought in that work on the well could finally be resumed and water was finally struck at 93 meters. The well was deepened to a 100 meters. The existence of a water source on the upper slopes of Mount Carmel would transform Haifa, becoming an elemental center for the sustenance of life for the following decades and for three invading armies. The well and its water would also become a vital source of income for the young, impoverished Technikum.

The Technikum completed construction on April 11, 1912.

=== War of the languages ===
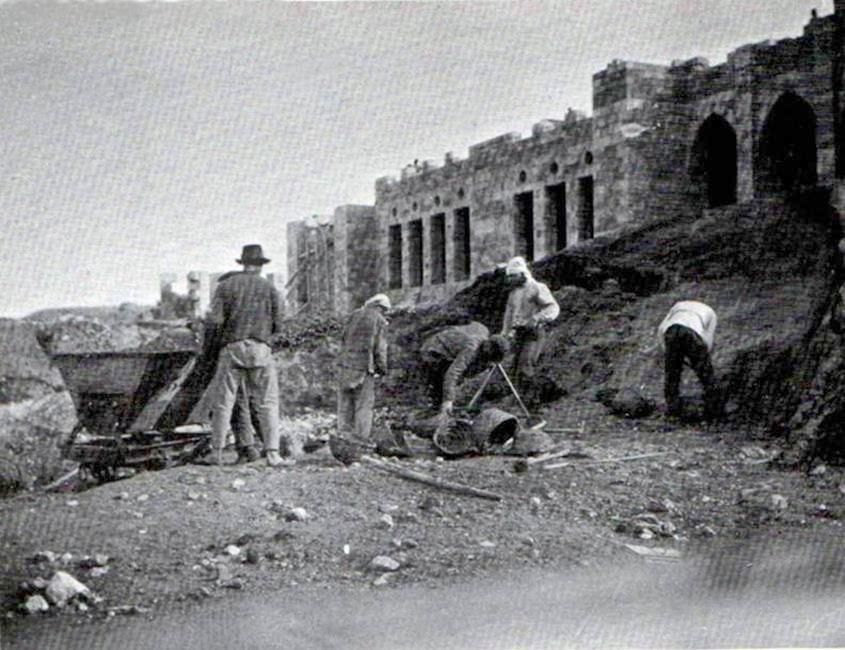
Construction of the Technion, 1912

An ongoing ideological conflict between the Hilfsverein – a global educational organization led by Jews from Germany – and the Zionist movement, escalated into an intense conflict over the planned language of instruction, known as the War of the Languages. Modern Hebrew was still in its infancy, and technical education was non-existent in the biblical tongue. A strong case was put forward for the Technikum to be run in German. A compromise of English was offered. Only the outcome of World War I and the diminished German influence in Palestine would finally resolve that Hebrew would be the official language of the Technion, and later the State of Israel.

=== Albert Einstein and other supporters ===
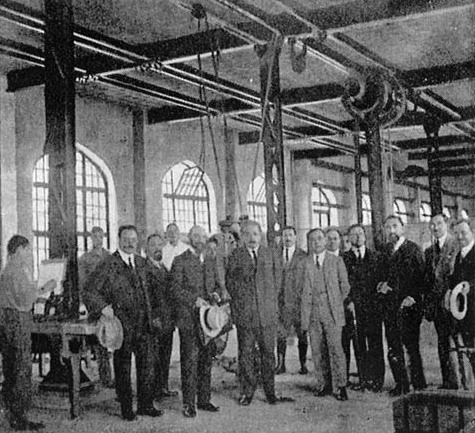
Albert Einstein at the Technion, c.1923

The development of technical and scientific opportunities for the Jewish people and at the new Technikum in Palestine in particular was an issue Prof. Albert Einstein felt worth his investment. "The development of Palestine is of real tremendous importance for all of Jewry," he said at a testimonial dinner with the American Technion Society. In 1923, Einstein visited the Technion. During his visit, he planted a now-famous first palm tree. The tree still stands today in front of the old Technion building in Hadar. Einstein returned to Germany to set up the first Technion Society, and served as its Chairman. He was later to tour America to raise funds for higher-education in Palestine, an issue he said he held "close to his heart". Einstein's motivation was not nationalistic, but humanistic. "I do what I can to help those in my tribe who are treated so badly everywhere," he said.

=== First classes ===
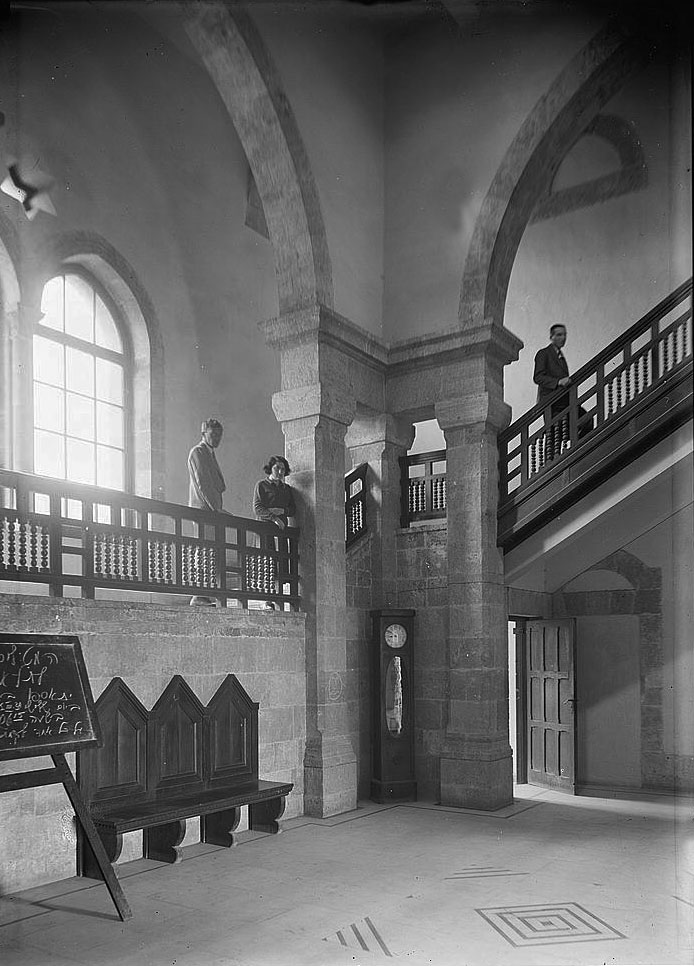
Technion students in the main lobby (1930s)

Arthur Blok, an electrical engineer, was the school's first President, assuming the position in 1924 until 1925. The Technion enrolled its first students in 1924, and its official opening ceremony took place in 1925. Its first class had 17 students, including one woman, who majored in civil engineering and architecture. Blok was succeeded as president by civil engineer Max Hecker (1925–27), Shmuel Pewsner (1927–29), Aharon Tcherniavsky (1927–29), and Joseph Breuer (1930–31).

== World War II ==
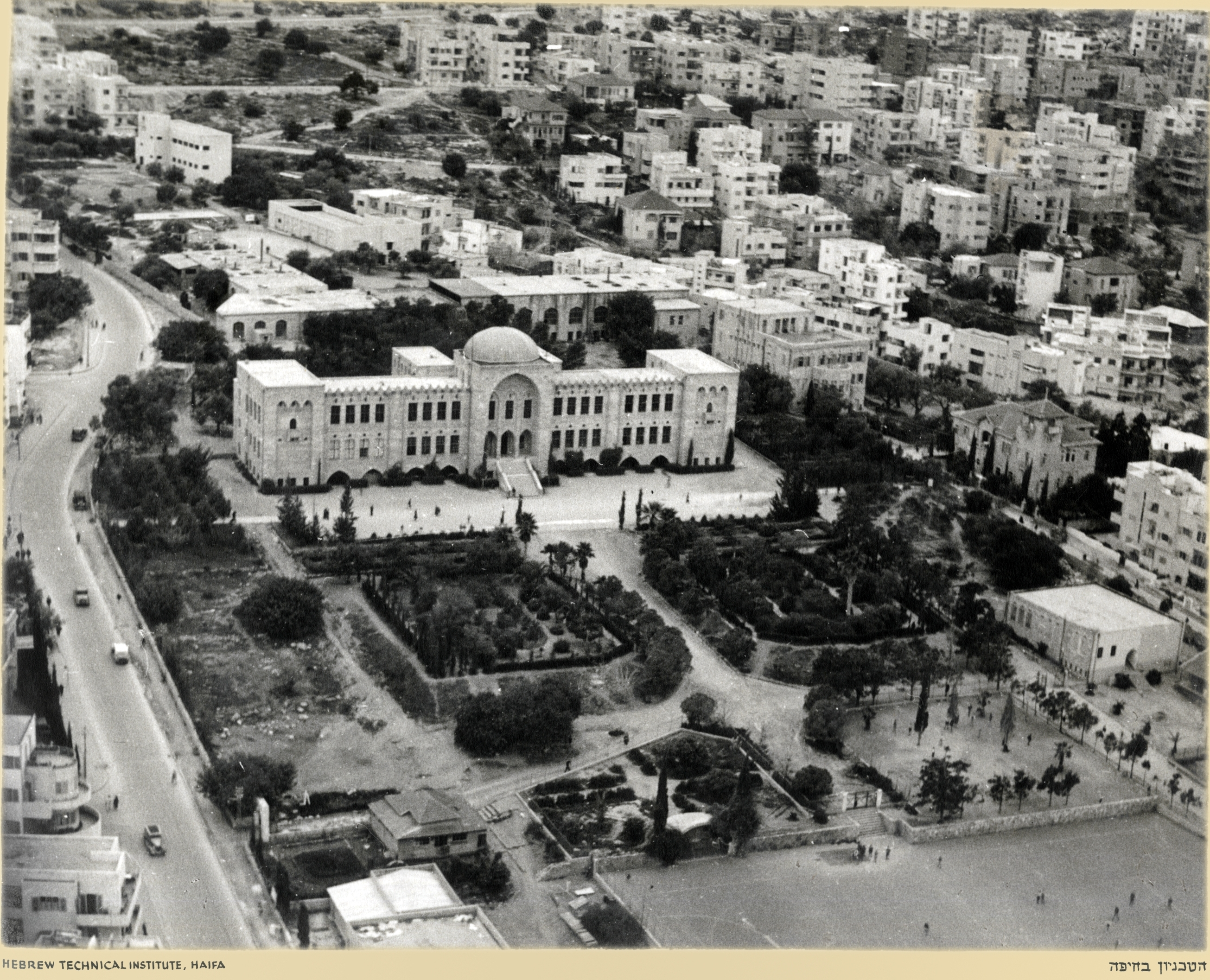
The Technion, 1937

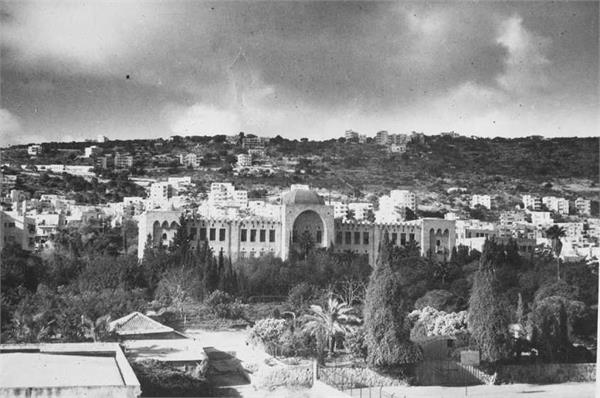
The Technion, 1945

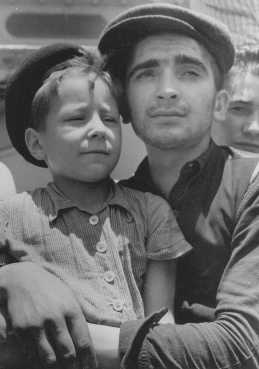
Refugees from the Holocaust arriving in Haifa

Shlomo Kaplansky was the president of the university from 1931 to 1950. In the 1930s, the Institute absorbed large numbers of Jewish students and distinguished scholars from Poland, Germany, and Austria, who were fleeing the Nazi regime. In the midst of immense financial difficulties, Technion staff voted to work temporarily without pay to ensure the Technion's economic survival. In 1934, the Faculty of Industrial Technology was established covering broad fields. By the late 1930s the demand for technical university graduates had increased, and many Technion students volunteered to fight with the British against the Third Reich. Enrollment exceeded 400 students, and the University had expanded to include a degree in industrial engineering, 11 labs, and a nautical school. In time, fields of study taught at the Faculty of Industrial Technology were made into independent faculties.

In the years preceding the establishment of the State, Technion was an active center for the Jewish underground – notably the Hagannah – and a source of technological defense solutions crucial to the struggle for independence.

== Israel independence ==
Yaakov Dori, first Chief of the General Staff of the Israel Defense Forces and 7th president of the Techion

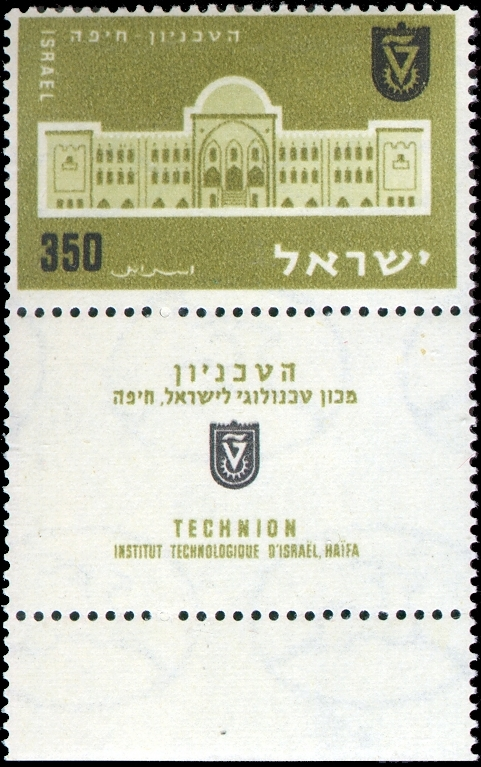
Technion national stamp, 1956

In 1948, with a student body of 680, Technion celebrated Israel's Declaration of Independence. The developing state created new demands on the veteran university. To meet these needs, Technion launched a variety of ambitious projects. In 1948, the Faculty of Electrical Engineering and the Faculty of Mechanical Engineering were set up. The Department of Aeronautical Engineering was established in 1949, and it claims to have laid the foundation for Israel's successful aerospace industries and Air Force.

== Rapid expansion and a new campus ==
Yaakov Dori, formerly the first Chief of Staff of the Israel Defense Forces, was President of the university from 1951 to 1965. By 1951, undergraduate enrollment had grown to 966 students. As the original campus in central Haifa had become too small, Prime Minister David Ben-Gurion selected a 300-acre site on Mount Carmel for a new campus. In 1953, the Institute began its move to Technion City on Mount Carmel.

In the 1950s the following Faculties were founded:

- Department of Aeronautical Engineering (1953) (renamed Faculty of Aerospace Engineering);
- Faculty of Agricultural Engineering (1953);
- Faculty of Chemical Engineering (1954);
- Faculty of Chemistry (1958);
- General Studies (1958) (renamed Department of Humanities and Arts);
- Faculty of Industrial Engineering and Management (1958).

== Decades of war and peace ==
During the 1960s, the Technion opened its doors to hundreds of students from the developing countries of Africa and Asia. Scores of Technion faculty members provided technological assistance to various countries worldwide, often under the auspices of United Nations agencies. Recognizing the growing trend in interdisciplinary activity, Technion established several new departments, including Biomedical Engineering, Computer Science, Applied Mathematics, and the Solid State Institute. Alexander Goldberg, a chemical engineer, was President of the university from 1965 to 1973. In 1969, Technion established the Faculty of Medicine, one of the few medical schools worldwide to be affiliated with an institute of technology. The 1970s in Israel were marked by tragedy of the Yom Kippur War and the optimism of Israel's peace agreement with Egypt. Technion remained at the forefront of the nation's activities – from producing technologies for guaranteeing Israel's future security, to planning cooperative regional research projects in subjects such as desalination and nuclear energy. The establishment of the Samuel Neaman Institute for Advanced Studies in Science and Technology at the Technion in 1978 further encouraged the interaction of academia, industry and government. In 1971 the Faculty of Biology was established. Amos Horev, an Israel Defense Forces Major-General and nuclear scientist, was President of the university from 1973 to 1982.

== The birth of Israeli high tech ==
In the 1980s, Technion-based research and its high number of graduates is said to have paved the way for the rapid expansion of Israel's high-tech industries. From the birth of fiber optics and the development of optoelectronics, Technion graduates were seen to be at the local forefront of technological innovation of the time. Josef Singer, an aeronautical engineer, was President of the university from 1982 to 1986, and Max Reis, a chemical engineer, from 1986 to 1990.

In the early 1990s, massive immigration from the former Soviet Union boosted the student population from 9,000 to 10,500. As well as absorbing a significant flow of high quality scientists and engineers from the former Soviet Union, Technion established technological incubator companies and structures to ensure that the new talent could be put to use. Zehev Tadmor, a chemical engineer, was President of the university from 1990 to 1998.

Multidisciplinary centers of excellence were established, ties with industry were strengthened, new academic programs were developed, and a campus expansion program was launched, including construction of The Henry and Marilyn Taub and Family Science and Technology Center, which houses the western world's largest computer science faculty.

In 1998, Technion's Asher Space Research Institute (ASRI) successfully launched the "Gurwin TechSat II" microsatellite, making Technion one of five universities with a student program that designs, builds, and launches its own satellite. Amos Lapidot, the tenth Commander of the Israeli Air Force, was President of the university from 1998 to 2001, and Yitzhak Apeloig, a pioneer in the computational chemistry field, from 2001 to 2009.

In 2007, the Technion's historic role in technology transfer in Israel was streamlined globally with the launch of its T3 Technion Technology Transfer office. Peretz Lavie, an expert in the psychophysiology of sleep and sleep disorders, was President of the university from 2009 to 2019.

Technion has an active multidisciplinary center in Energy Research, to strengthen Israel as the globe reaches peak oil. It also has campus-wide programs in Nanotechnology and Science, and Life Science and Engineering. Uri Sivan, a physicist, has been President of the university since 2019.

== First Nobel prizes in science ==
In 2004, two Technion scientists became the first Israelis to bring home the Nobel Prize in Science. Avram Hershko, Aaron Ciechanover – together with colleague Irwin Rose – unraveled how the cell functions as a highly efficient checking station where proteins are built up and broken down. The degradation is not indiscriminate but takes place through a process that is controlled in detail so that the proteins to be broken down at any given moment are given a molecular label. The labelled proteins are then fed into the cells' "waste disposers", or proteasomes, where they are chopped into small pieces and destroyed.

The label consists of a molecule called ubiquitin. This fastens to the protein to be destroyed, accompanies it to the proteasome where it is recognised as the key in a lock, and signals that a protein is on the way for disassembly. Shortly before the protein is squeezed into the proteasome, its ubiquitin label is disconnected for re-use. Examples of processes governed by ubiquitin-mediated protein degradation are cell division, DNA repair, quality control of newly produced proteins, and important parts of the immune defence.

In 2011, the Nobel Prize for chemistry was awarded to Prof. Dan Shechtman, for his discovery of quasiperiodic crystals, or "Shechtmanite".

== Historic Technion achievements ==
- Technion is one of only five universities in the world with a student program to design and build satellites (the first launch attempt in 1995 failed, success launch of the identical copy was in 1998).
- DNA strands were used for the first time to assemble a conductive wire 1,000 times thinner than a human hair.
- The origin of a new anti-Parkinson's drug that is sold worldwide.
- The home of the Shechtmanite and Quasiperiodic Crystals – a new class of materials. The discovery earned Prof. Dan Shechtman the Nobel Prize for Chemistry in 2011.
- The Lempel-Ziv algorithm that has become an international standard for data compression, and an IEEE Milestone.
- Co-authoring the first paper revealing that embryonic stem cells can be cultivated for medical application.
- More than 70% of founders and managers in the Israeli high tech industry are Technion graduates.
- A group of Technion graduates created PHP (versions 3 through 5), a web programming language installed on more than 80% of web servers worldwide.

== See also ==
- Science and technology in Israel
