= William James Wintle =

William James Wintle (1861–1934) was an English journalist and writer.

== Life ==
Wintle's family was from Gloucestershire. He was educated at the Sir Walter St John's Grammar School For Boys, in Battersea. He then was headmaster of a school for a time.

By 1896 Wintle was writing for the Windsor Magazine. He then joined the Harmsworth staff, working for Lord Northcliffe. There he worked on magazines, and the Harmsworth Encyclopaedia, a part-published (=serialized) work. Later he was director of a publishing house.

As naturalist, Wintle was known as a shell collector; his collection went to that of Arthur Blok. He became a fellow of the Zoological Society during 1899. He joined the Malacological Society of London also, during 1916, and was its Secretary during 1919; he was elected to the Conchological Society of Great Britain and Ireland during 1917.

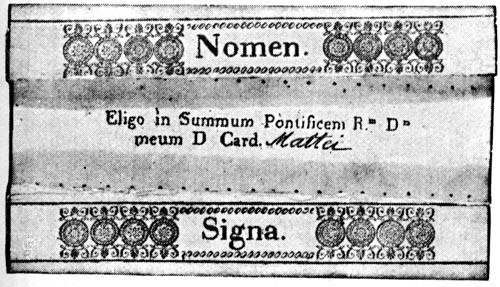
Papal conclave ballot, illustration from the article "How the Pope is Elected" by W. J. Wintle, in the London Magazine for June, 1903

Interested in Christian religion, Wintle donated to the Anglican church in Chiswick. He spent time on Caldey Island with the Benedictines there. A British Museum list of those presenting zoology specimens during 1920 includes a Brother W. J. Wintle. He later became a Roman Catholic convert.

== Works ==
One of Wintle's pieces of journalism, Life in Our New Century from 1901, was published originally in the Harmsworth Magazine.

Wintle also composed and published various books:

- Armenia and its Sorrows (1896), prompted by the Hamidian massacres. A letter of endorsement from W. E. Gladstone to Wintle was used to publicise the book.
- Paradise Row and Some of its Inhabitants (1897)
- Recreations with a Pocket Lens (1911)
- Nights with an Old Lag (1911)
- Pilgrim Songs on the King's Highway (1911)
- The Songs of Old England (1912)
- Ghost Gleams: Tales of the Uncanny (1921). These are regarded as ghost stories for children, and A Light in the Dormitory has been included in an anthology.

Wintle wrote for the Sunday School Union, using the pseudonym "John Upton" for a weekly article for the Union's Sunday School Chronicle. With them he published:

- The Story of Florence Nightingale (1896)
- The Story of Albert the Good (Prince Consort) (1897)
- Dr. J. L. Phillips ... A Biographical Sketch (1898) with Mary Phillips; biography of James Liddell Phillips (1840–1895)
- The Story of Victoria, R.I.: Wife, Mother, Queen (1901)
- Florence Nightingale and Frances E. Willard: the Story of Their Lives, with Florence Witts, undated

According to his obituary, Wintle also wrote a Life of Charles Spurgeon.
