= GTEP =

GTEP may refer to:

- Georgia Train and Equip Program, a military program in Georgia
- Grand Technion Energy Program, an education center in Israel
