= Thomas Kilduff =

American neuroscientist and sleep researcher

- Education: University of Florida; Stanford University
- Known for: Discovery of hypocretin
- Awards: 2009 AAAS Fellow
- Scientific career
- Fields: Neuroscience, particularly the neurobiology of sleep and wakefulness
- Workplaces: Ames Research Center; Stanford University School of Medicine; SRI International
- Academic advisors: Wilse B. Webb, Craig Heller, Bill A. Williams, William C. Dement

Thomas S. Kilduff is an American neuroscientist and the director of SRI International's Center for Neuroscience. He specializes in neurobiology related to sleep and wakefulness, and was involved in the discovery of hypocretin (also known as orexin), a neuropeptide system that is highly involved in wakefulness regulation.

His group at SRI International also discovered an unusual neuronal population in the cerebral cortex that is activated during sleep.

He is also a consulting professor at the Stanford University School of Medicine's Department of Psychiatry and Behavioral Sciences.

== Education ==
Kilduff obtained a B.S. from the University of Florida and earned an M.S. and a Ph.D. in biological sciences from Stanford University, where he was also awarded fellowships from the Danforth Foundation, the Grass Foundation, and the National Science Foundation.

== Career ==
Kilduff was a senior research scientist at Stanford University's Center for Sleep and Circadian Neurobiology. He was also a visiting scientist in the Scripps Research Institute's Department of Molecular Biology, a visiting professor at the University of Perugia's Istituto di Biologia Cellulare, and a National Academy of Sciences National Research Council research associate at NASA's Ames Research Center.

In 1999, Kilduff joined SRI International as part of a new molecular neurobiology group, where he subsequently founded the Sleep Neurobiology Program before becoming director of the Center for Neuroscience.

== Research ==
Kilduff's early research focused on the neural control of mammalian hibernation and circadian rhythms.

Kilduff and scientists at the Scripps Research Institute co-discovered hypocretin (also known as orexin), a neuropeptide system that is involved in the control of wakefulness. Subsequent research established that the hypocretin neurons degenerate in the sleep disorder narcolepsy and is the likely cause of this disorder.

== Awards and memberships ==
He was named a Fellow Member of the American Association for the Advancement of Science in the December 18, 2009 issue of Science. He was named an SRI Fellow in 2010 and a Distinguished Scientist by the SRS in 2017.

He is a member of the Society for Neuroscience has served on the boards of the Associated Professional Sleep Societies, the Sleep Research Society, and was a Founding Member of the Sleep Research Society Foundation.

== See also ==
- Neuroscience of sleep
