= Amos Lapidot =

Israeli fighter pilot and commander (1934–2019)

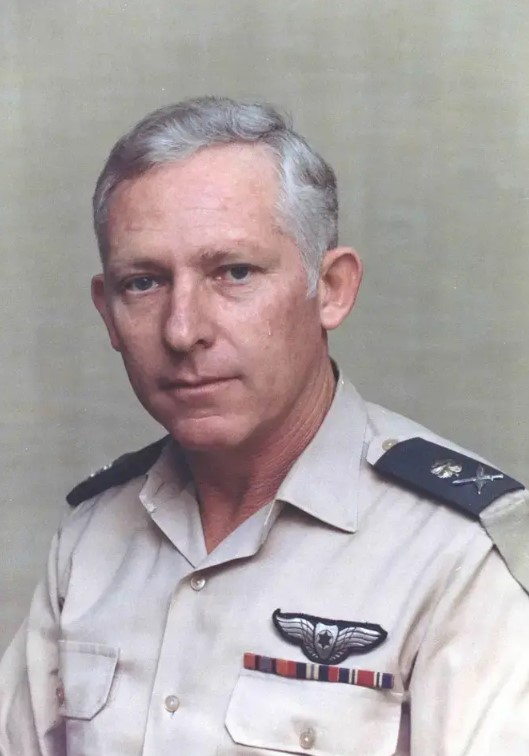
- Native name: עמוס לפידות
- Born: 1934; Kfar Saba, Mandatory Palestine (now Israel)
- Died: November 20, 2019 (aged 85)
- Allegiance: Israel Defense Forces
- Service years: 1952–1987
- Rank: Aluf
- Commands: 113 Squadron, Hatzor Airbase, Air Intelligence Directorate, Commander of the Israeli Air Force
- Conflicts: Suez Crisis; Six-Day War; War of Attrition; Yom Kippur War; 1982 Lebanon War; South Lebanon conflict Operation Wooden Leg
- Other work: President of Technion – Israel Institute of Technology, Chair of the academic committee of the Fisher Institute for Air and Space Strategic Studies

Aluf Amos Lapidot (Hebrew: עמוס לפידות; 1934 – November 20, 2019) was an Israeli fighter pilot who served as the tenth Commander of the Israeli Air Force, a position he held from 1982 to 1987. From 1998 to 2001 he was the President of Technion – Israel Institute of Technology.

== Biography ==
Lapidot was born in Kfar Saba, Israel, in 1934, and grew up in Havatzelet HaSharon. He initially enlisted in the IDF Artillery Corps, before eventually joining the nascent Israeli Air Force, and completed the IAF pilots' course in 1954. He flew the P-51 Mustang, Gloster Meteor, and Dassault Ouragan.

Lapidot held a BA in mathematics from Tel Aviv University, and a master's degree in financial systems engineering from Stanford University.

During the Suez Crisis, he flew the Ouragan and the Dassault Mystère. In 1961 he switched to the Dassault Mirage III and became the deputy commander of 101 Squadron, the IAF's first Mirage squadron. In 1962, he was assigned command of 113 Squadron, flying Ouragans, and in 1965 became commander of 101 Squadron, which he was to lead during the Six-Day War. In 1970, he was put in charge of the weapons department in the Israeli Air Force and in 1973 became commander of Hatzor Airbase, which he led during the Yom Kippur War.

In 1975, Lapidot was put in charge of the Air Intelligence Directorate and in 1981 he became the director of the IAI Lavi project. A year later, in 1982, he was promoted to the rank of Aluf and became the Commander of the Israeli Air Force.

During his tenure, the Israeli Air Force received more F-16 fighter jets and upgraded its missile inventory with the Israeli AGM-142 Have Nap. It was under his aegis that the IAF carried out Operation Wooden Leg, a raid on the headquarters of the Palestine Liberation Organization (PLO) at Hammam al-Shatt, Tunisia (1,500 miles away from Israel). In 1987, Lapidot completed his term as Commander of the Israeli Air Force and handed command over to Avihu Ben-Nun.

In 1988, Lapidot created a think-tank organization. From 1998 to 2001 he was the President of Technion – Israel Institute of Technology, following Zehev Tadmor and followed by Yitzhak Apeloig. In 2007, he headed a public committee appointed by Transport Minister Shaul Mofaz to examine aviation safety. He resigned in May 2008 after its recommendations were not implemented. He was the chair of the academic committee of the Fisher Institute for Air and Space Strategic Studies.

== Gallery ==
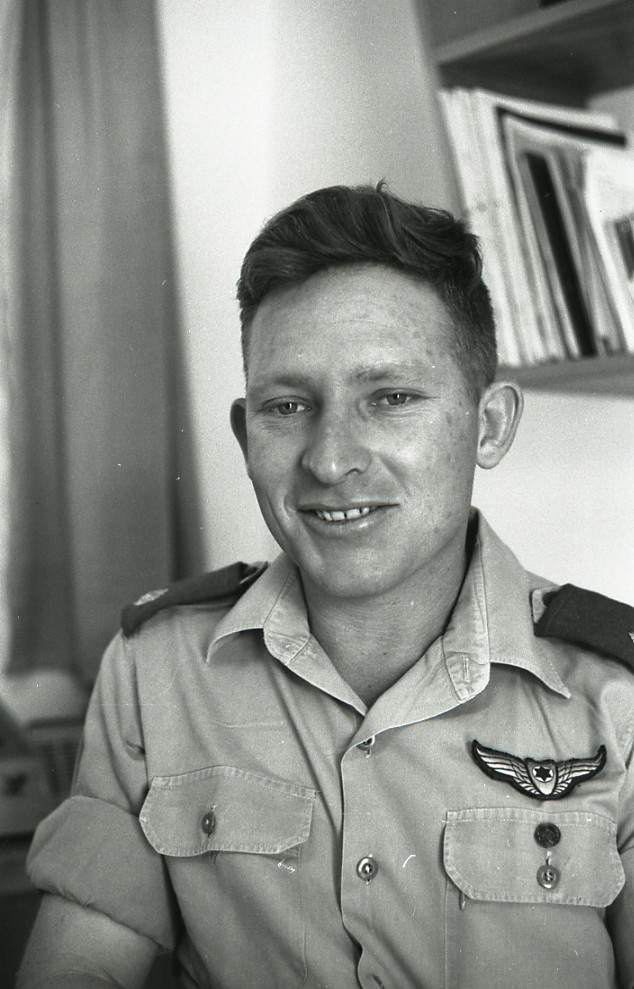
Amos Lapidot in his younger years

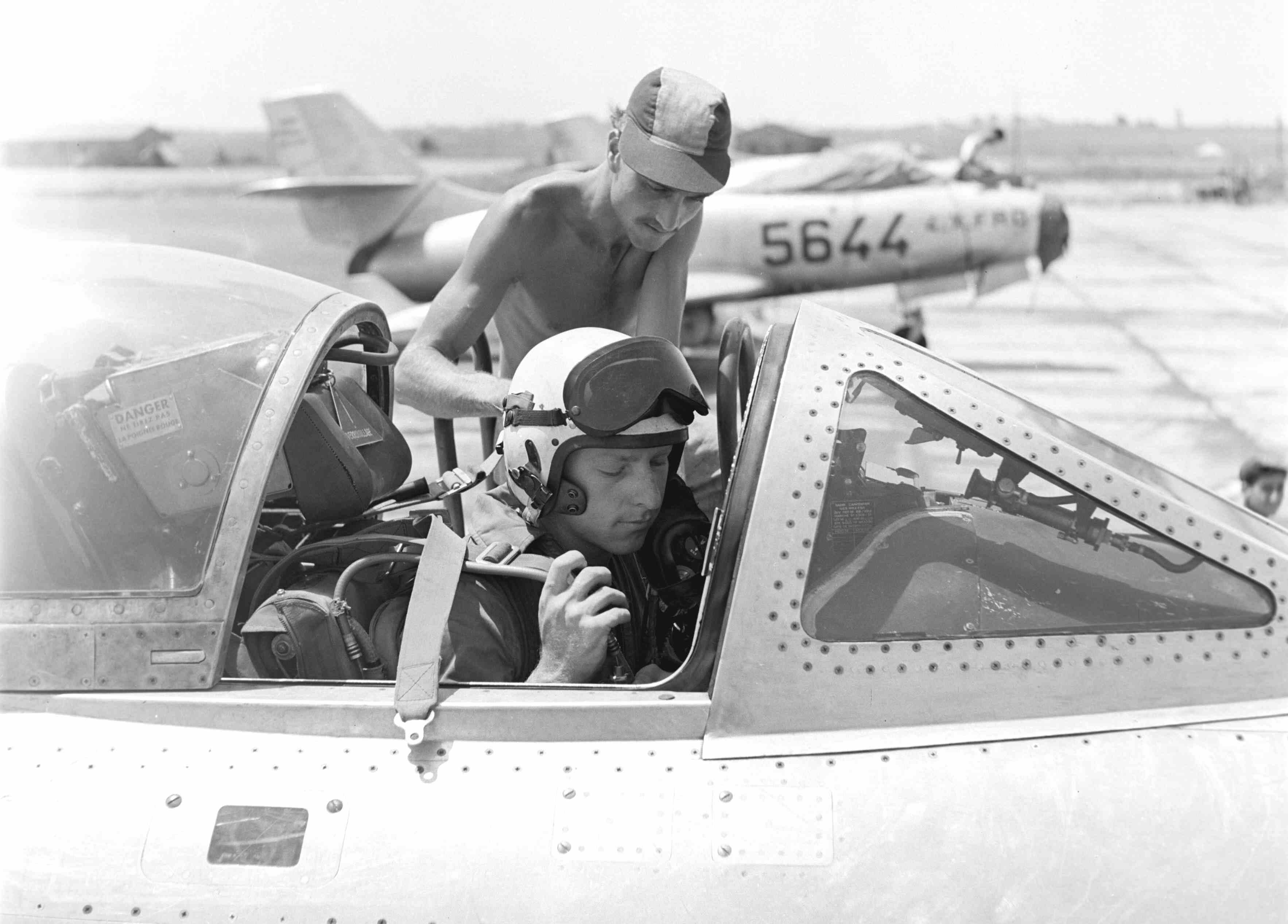
Amos Lapidot 1956 as pilot of a Dassault Ouragan at Hatzor Airbase

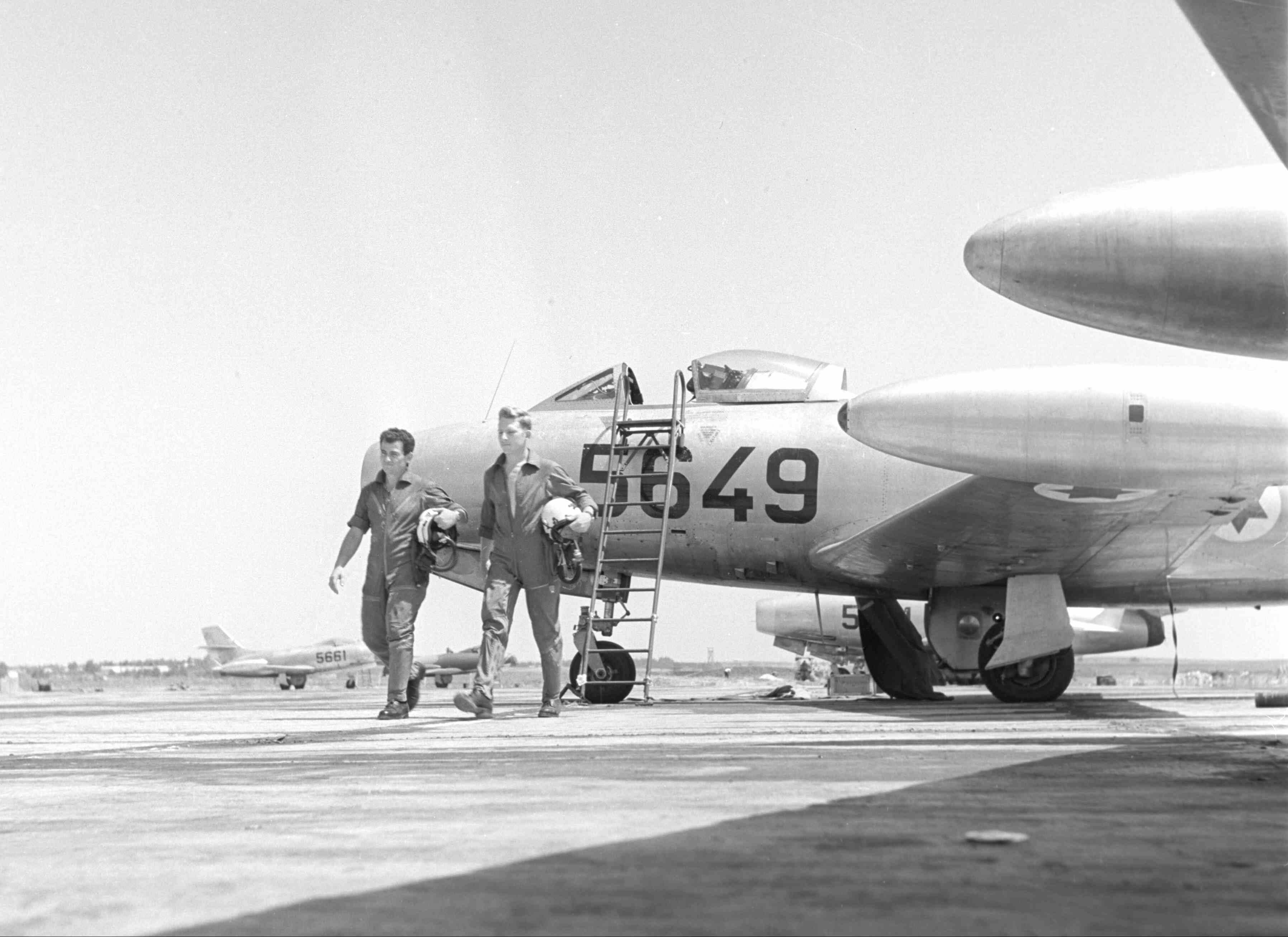
Amos Lapidot (right) 1956 after getting out of his Dassault Ouragan jet at Hatzor Airbase

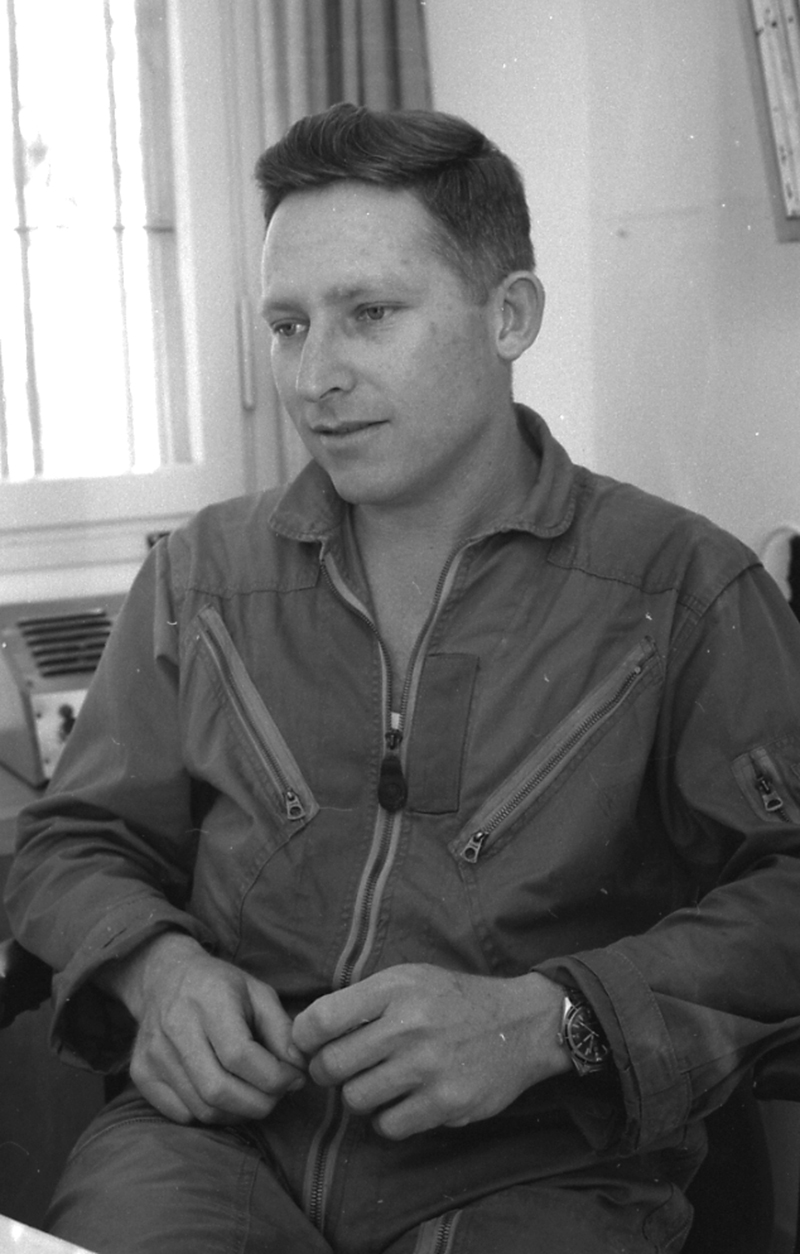
Amos Lapidot as commander of 101 Squadron "First Fighter" in 1967, the year of the Six-Day War

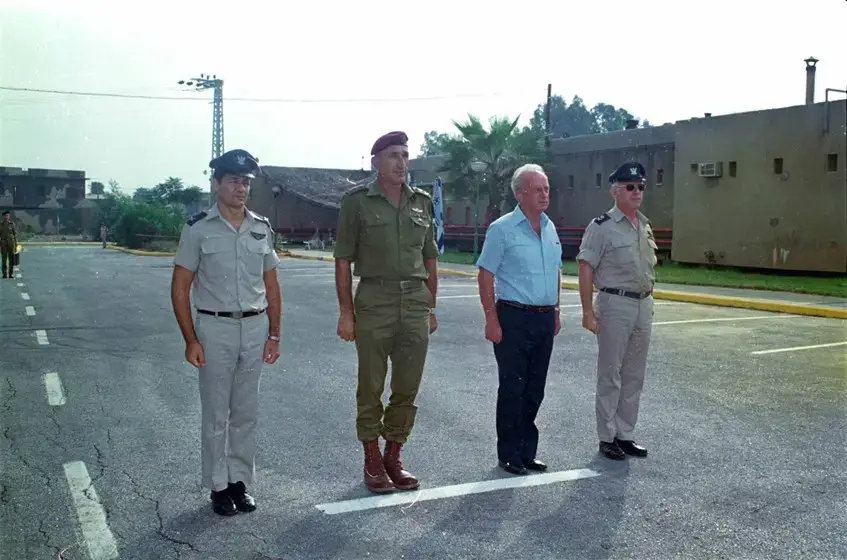
Amos Lapidot (right) beside Yitzhak Rabin 1984 at Tel Nof Airbase

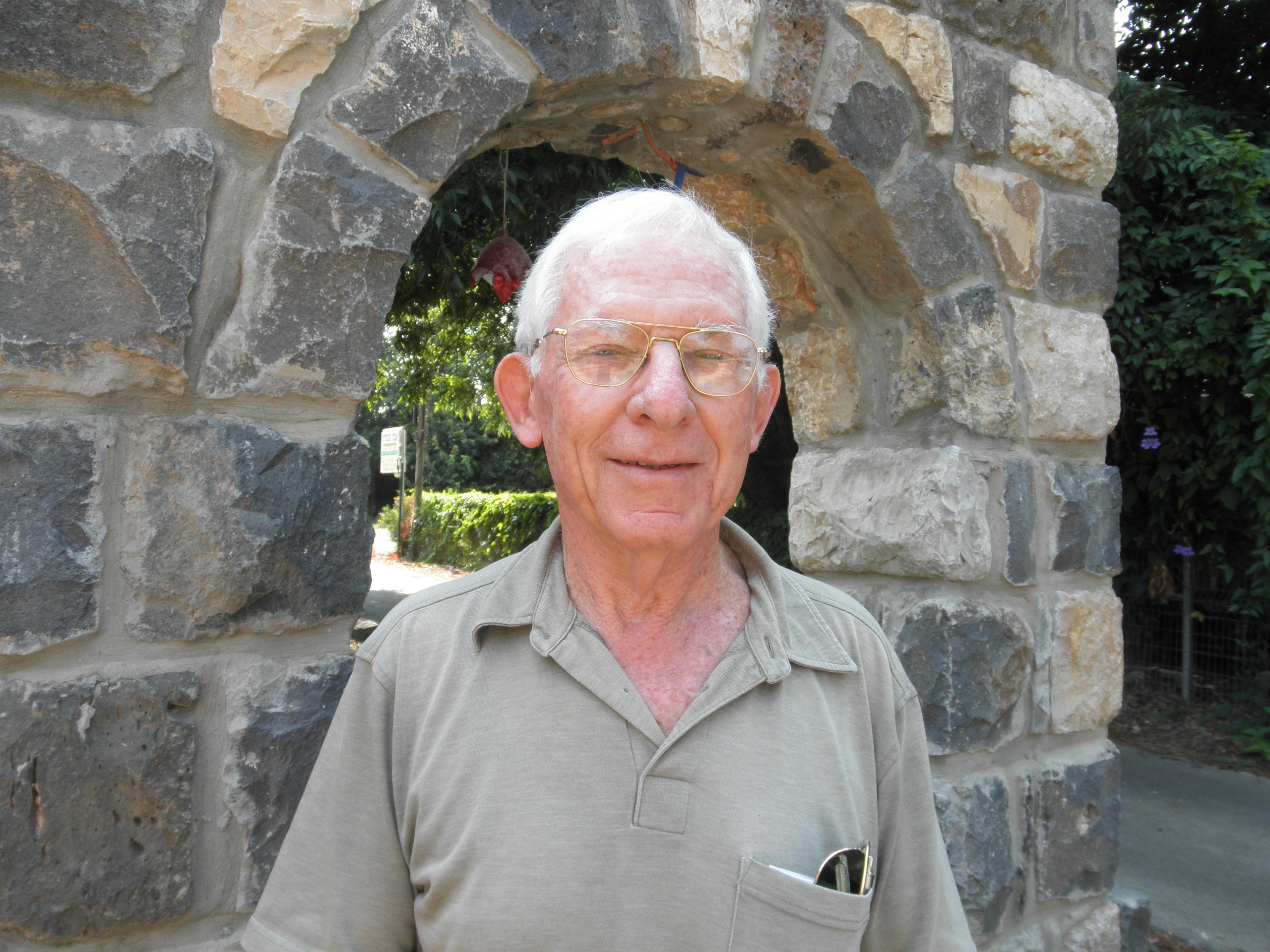
Amos Lapidot in 2012
