= Peretz Lavie =

Israeli scholar

- פרץ לביא
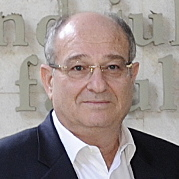
- Lavie (2011)
- Born: 19 February 1949 (age 77); Petah Tikva, Israel
- Education: Tel Aviv University; University of Florida; University of California, San Diego
- Known for: 16th president of the Technion - Israel Institute of Technology; expert in the psychophysiology of sleep and sleep disorders; Heads the Technion Sleep Laboratory; André Ballard Chair in Biological Psychiatry; Dean of the Rappaport Faculty of Medicine (1993–1999)
- Awards: EMET Prize in medicine (2006)

Peretz Lavie (Hebrew: פרץ לביא; born 19 February 1949) was the 16th president of the Technion - Israel Institute of Technology, having taken the position on 1 October 2009 through September 2019. Lavie, an expert in the psychophysiology of sleep and sleep disorders, heads the Technion Sleep Laboratory and holds the André Ballard Chair in Biological Psychiatry. Between 1993 and 1999 he served as dean of the Rappaport Faculty of Medicine, and between 2001 and 2008, as the Technion's vice president for resource development and external relations.

Lavie has authored several books, including The Enchanted World of Sleep and Restless Nights: Understanding Sleep Apnea and Snoring. Lavie has founded several start-up companies.

== Biography ==
Peretz Lavie was born in Petah Tikva, Israel, in 1949. The family moved to Zikhron Ya'akov, where he completed his studies at the elementary school Nili and then at the regional high school in Pardes Hanna. He was an instructor and coordinator in the youth movement Maccabi Hatzair. He finished his bachelor's degree in statistics and psychology at Tel Aviv University.

He received his PhD in physiological psychology at the University of Florida, in 1974, working in the pioneering sleep laboratory of Wilse B. Webb. He continued postdoctorate research at the Department of Psychiatry of the University of California, San Diego with Daniel Kripke.

On his return to Israel in 1975, Lavie joined the Technion – Israel Institute of Technology, where he set up a sleep research laboratory, which was then the first laboratory to diagnose sleep disorders. Now called the Center for Sleep Medicine, it currently has four branches in Israeli hospitals. Through these research facilities, over 120,000 people have been tested.

In 1997, Lavie initiated a similar center in the affiliated hospitals of Harvard University in the USA. In addition to clinical services, the center established companies that manufacture medical equipment for sleep testing. Among these is Itamar Medical – that manufactures equipment for home diagnosis of sleep disorder, identifying people who are at high risk for heart disease, and SLP that manufactures a variety of sensors for sleep laboratories.

Lavie initiated and participated in a number of actions to change public regulations in Israel, for example in cancelling the "zero hour" policy in primary schools. He was a promoter of daylight saving time and the prevention of road accidents due to fatigue and sleepiness. Lavie also persuaded the Israel Broadcasting Authority to broadcast a silent channel (broken only in the event of an alert) during The first Gulf War. This was also implemented during the second Lebanon War.

In 1978, Lavie became Senior Lecturer; in 1983 Associate Professor; and in 1989 Full Professor. In 1994, he was awarded the Andre Ballard Chair in Biological Psychiatry. Between 1993–99 he was appointed Dean of the Rappaport Faculty of Medicine at the Technion. From 2001–08 he was Vice President of the Technion's Public Affairs and Resource Development division.

Lavie was editor-in-chief of the Journal of Sleep Research He has written several books; written more than 400 scientific articles; and given hundreds of lectures. His bestselling book "The Enchanted World of Sleep" has been translated into 15 languages. Another, "Restless Nights: Understanding Snoring and Sleep Apnea," earned him the 2006 Brigham and Women's Hospital Authors Award.

As Technion President, which he became in 2009 succeeding Yitzhak Apeloig, Lavie was instrumental in forming an alliance with Cornell University in order to compete for the right to build Cornell Tech, a $2 billion graduate school of applied sciences on Roosevelt Island. The success of this bid, and the creation of the Technion-Cornell Institute of Innovation (TCII) in 2012, the first such honor to be received by any Israeli center of higher education.

Lavie's Technion Presidency witnessed the reception by Technion of its 3rd Nobel Prize in Science. In 2011, the Nobel Prize in Chemistry was awarded to Prof. Dan Shechtman for the discovery of quasicrystals. Lavie initiated and oversaw the Technion cornerstone centennial, in which 100 years of Technion history were celebrated since the laying of the first cornerstone in 1912. He was succeeded as president by Uri Sivan.

Peretz Lavie is married to Lena Lavie, a cell biologist, and has three children and three grandchildren.

== Awards ==
- 2006 – EMET Prize in medicine.
- 2006 – William Gruen Prize for Innovative Research, from the American Sleep Research Society
- 2005 – The Michele and Howard Kessler Health Education Library Award of the Brigham and Women's Hospital, Boston for the book "Restless Nights" (Yale University Press, 2003)
- 2004 – University of Pisa Biannual Sleep Research Award to the Best Sleep Researcher in Europe
- 2001 – Elkeles Prize, from the Israeli Ministry of Health and Keren Kayemet LeIsrael for Best Medical Scientist
- 1995 – Technion's Hershel Rich Prize in Technological Innovation

== Books ==
- Lectures on Sleep and Dreaming. Lavie, P. Ministry of Defense Publication, Israel, 1981 (Heb.).
- Ultradian Rhythms in Physiology and Behavior. Schulz, H. and Lavie, P. (Eds.) Springer, Berlin, 1985.
- Sleep. Horne, J. and Lavie, P. (Eds.). Fischer Struttgart, 1988.
- Brain, Structure and Function: Historical Concepts. Lavie, P. Ministry of Defense Publication, Israel 1989 (Heb.).
- The Enchanted World of Sleep. Lavie, P: Yale University Press (translated into French, Italian, German, Polish, Greek, Spanish, Portuguese, Czech, Ukrainian, Chinese [2 versions], Japanese) 1996.
- Sleep Disorders: Diagnosis, Management and Treatment. A Handbook for Clinicians. Lavie, P., Pillar, G. and A. Malhotra: Martin Dunitz Ltd, publishers, London, 2002.
- Sleepless nights: When snoring becomes sleep apnea. Lavie, P. Yediot Achronot / Sifrei Chemed, Tel-Aviv, Israel, 2002.
- Restless Nights: Understanding Snoring and Sleep Apnea. Lavie, P. Yale University Press, 2003.
