= Kinneret Keren =

Israeli physicist

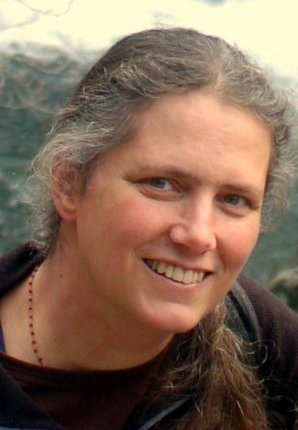
Keren in 2016

Kinneret Keren (Hebrew: כנרת קרן; born 1972) is an Israeli biophysicist and nanotechnologist whose research has involved the biology-based self-assembly of molecular electronics using DNA as a template, as well as the movement of biological cells, pattern formation, and morphogenesis in biology and synthetic biology. She is a faculty member in the Department of Physics at the Technion – Israel Institute of Technology.

== Education and career ==
Keren was born in 1972 in Jerusalem. She studied mathematics and physics at the Hebrew University of Jerusalem, graduating summa cum laude in 1996. After completing a master's degree in physics from the Weizmann Institute of Science in 1998, working with Ady Stern on quantum dots, she went to the Technion for continued study and received her Ph.D. there in 2003. Her doctoral dissertation, Self-Assembly of Molecular-Scale Electronics by Genetic Recombination, was jointly supervised by Erez Braun and Uri Sivan.

She was a postdoctoral researcher in biochemistry at Stanford University, working with cell biologist Julie Theriot, from 2003 to 2008, before returning to the Technion in 2008 as an assistant professor.

== Recognition ==
Keren was a 2010 recipient of the Krill Prize of the Wolf Foundation, and a 2011 recipient of the EBSA Young Investigators’ Medal and Prize of the European Biophysical Societies' Association.

She was named as a Fellow of the American Physical Society (APS) in 2024, after a nomination from the APS Division of Biological Physics, "for pioneering biophysical studies of mechanobiology, leading to new insights in our understanding of cell motility and morphogenesis and revealing the crucial roles of mechanical forces, membrane tension, and dynamics of actomyosin cytoskeleton in cellular movement".
