= Wilse B. Webb =

American psychologist and sleep researcher

Wilse B. Webb (1920–2018) familiarly known as Bernie Webb, was an American psychologist and sleep researcher, long associated with the University of Florida.

== Early life and education ==
Wilse B. Webb was born in October, 1920 in Yazoo City, Mississippi. He often went by the name of Bernie Web. In September 1941 he attended the University of Iowa. He graduated from Louisiana State University. When WWII broke out, he was in graduate school at the University of Iowa, where he studied under Kurt Lewin and Carl Seashore. Shortly after Pearl Harbor, he left school to become a psychologist in the Army Air Force. While studying combat pilot efficiency, he flew in strike missions against Japan and China. He returned to Iowa after the war, where he became "a believer in Clark Hull and a disciple of Kenneth Spence". Spence was influential in theories of learning and motivation. Webb completed his PhD in 1947. Just ten years after completing his PhD, Webb published his first paper regarding the subject of sleep in the journal of Experimental Psychology.

== Career ==
Early in his career, Webb held teaching positions at the University of Tennessee and Washington University in St. Louis, and was head of the U.S. Navy's Aviation Psychology Laboratory in Pensacola, Florida. In 1959, he moved to the University of Florida as chairman of the psychology department. He remained there for the rest of his career, serving into his 90s as a Graduate Research Professor of psychology.

His doctoral students at Florida included Peretz Lavie and Thomas Kilduff, among many others.

Wilse B. Webb was an Honorary Life Member of the Southern Society for Philosophy and Psychology, and was its president in 1960. He held many responsible positions in the American Psychological Association, including serving as a member of the Communications Committee with oversight on development of a National Information System for Psychology in the early 1970s. The sleep community recognized his efforts and contributions to sleep and elected his an Honorary Member of the American Academy of Sleep Medicine. Webb died on January 15, 2018, aged 97.

== Publications ==
Wilse B. Webb wrote or edited seven books and about 250 papers, mostly on the subject of sleep. His last known publication, at age 91, was a comment on the article Harnessing the Power of Wikipedia for Scientific Psychology. He said "I view this project [Wikipedia] as one of the most important in advancing the public knowledge of psychology that I have ever seen."

Wilse B. Webb dedicated his life to research, specifically in the field of psychology involving sleep. His appreciation for research is that its standards specify how accurately and reliably data is collected. One form of data collection Webb warns his readers about is surveying the public. In his article “Opinion Polls and Science”, Webb warns his readers about the danger of opinion polls used as scientific data, calling it unreliable. Opinion surveys do not gauge behavioral or physical events, and they do not meet scientific standards. One example of a danger is a low response rate, which may introduce sampling bias as only those who are interested may respond - rather than a true representation of those with the health concerns under research. Webb concludes that while surveys have their place, they should not be equivalent to scientific data.

=== Books ===
- Sleep: The Gentle Tyrant. Anker Publishing Co., 1992
- Biological Rhythms, Sleep, and Performance. John Wiley & Sons, 1982
- Sleep: An Experimental Approach. Prentice Hall, 1976
- Sleep: An Active Process: Research and Commentary. Pearson Scott Foresman, 1973
- Sleep Therapy: A Bibliography and Commentary. Charles C. Thomas, Ltd., 1966

=== Selected articles ===
This is a list of Wilse Webb's 20 most recent articles. More can be found on his page at ResearchGate.

- "Opinion Polls and Science". in Sleep 33(7):865-6 · July 2010
- "The first night effect: An EEG study". in Psychophysiology 2(3):263 - 266 · January 2007
- "The different prevention science". in American Psychologist 52(10):1141 · October 1997
- "Sleep as a biological rhythm: A historical view". in Sleep · March 1994
- "Human Subjects Review Boards: A Modest Proposal". in American Psychologist 42(5):516-517 · May 1987
- "Enhanced slow sleep in extended sleep". in Electroencephalography and Clinical Neurophysiology 64(1):27-30 · August 1986
- "A Further Analysis of Age and Sleep Deprivation Effects". in Psychophysiology 22(2):156 - 161 · March 1985
- "Experiments on extended performance: Repetition, age, and limited sleep periods". in Behavior Research Methods 17(1):27-36 · January 1985
- "Age, Sleep Deprivation, and Performance". in Psychophysiology 19(3):272 - 276 · May 1982
- "A historical footnote on sex differences research". in American Psychologist 37(3):338-338 · March 1982
- "My Problems with Human Subjects". in Teaching of Psychology 8(2):113-114 · April 1981
- "An Essay on Consciousness". in Teaching of Psychology 8(1):15-19 · February 1981
- "Sleep and Sleeplessness in Advanced Age, Vol. 5". Advances in Sleep Research. in PsycCRITIQUES 26(10) · January 1981
- "In pursuit of the shiftworker: A discussion of methodologies". in Behavior Research Methods 11(1):24-25 · January 1979
- "The Reliability of Arousal Threshold During Sleep". in Psychophysiology 15(5):412 - 416 · September 1978
- "The research-academic psychologist". in American Psychologist 32(10):894-895 · October 1977
- "Temporal Distribution and Ontogenetic Development of EEG Activity During Sleep". in Psychophysiology 14(3):315 - 321 · May 1977
- "Progress in psychology: 1903-1907". in American Psychologist 29(12):897-902 · December 1974
- "The displacement of stages 4 and REM sleep with a full night of sleep". in Psychophysiology 5(2):142-148 · September 1968
- "Sleep cycle reversal". in Psychophysiology 5:216 · January 1968
