= Yitzhak Apeloig =

Israeli scholar (1944–2026)

- יצחק אפלויג
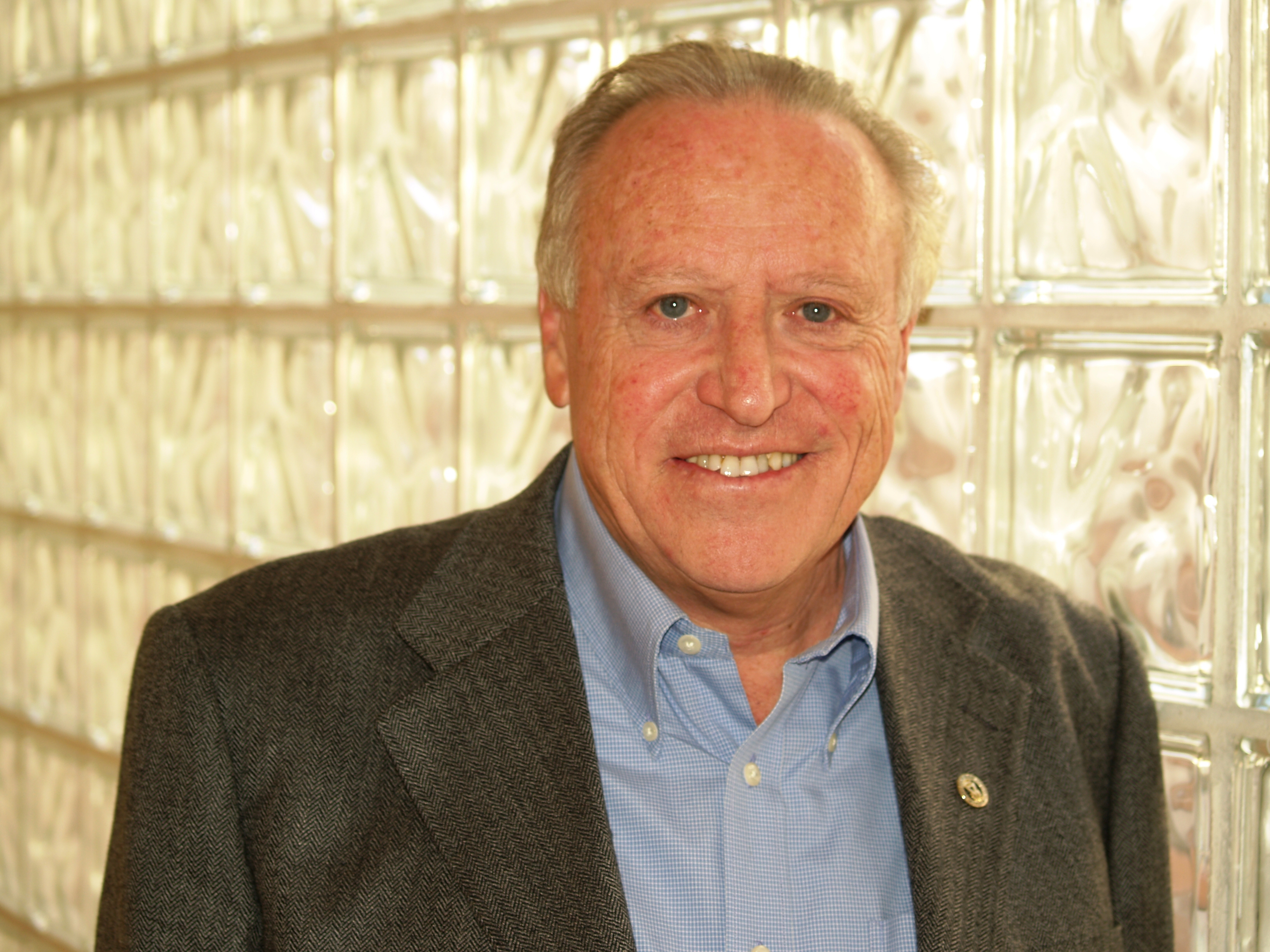
- Born: 1 September 1944; Buchara, Uzbek SSR, USSR
- Died: 28 May 2026 (aged 81); Haifa, Israel
- Education: The Hebrew University (Ph.D., 1974); Princeton University (Postdoctoral, 1974–1976)
- Occupation: Distinguished Professor at the Schulich Faculty of Chemistry
- Employer: Technion
- Organization: Schulich Faculty of Chemistry
- Known for: President of the Technion 2001–2009; Distinguished Professor at the Schulich Faculty of Chemistry
- Title: President of the Technion
- Term: 9
- Predecessor: Amos Lapidot
- Successor: Peretz Lavie
- Awards: Frederic Stanley Kipping Award in Silicon Chemistry, 2010
- Website: chemistry.technion.ac.il/en/team/yitzhak-apeloig/

Yitzhak Apeloig (Hebrew: יצחק אפלויג; 1 September 1944 – 28 May 2026) was an Israeli scholar who was a pioneer in the computational chemistry field of the Ab initio quantum chemistry methods for predicting and preparing the physical and chemical properties of materials. He was the president of the Technion from 2001 until 2009 where the position was handed off to Peretz Lavie. Apeloig held the Joseph Israel Freund Chair in Chemistry and was the co-director of the Lise Meitner Minerva Center for Computational Quantum Chemistry at the Technion. He served as dean of the Faculty of Chemistry from 1995 to 1999, where he was named Teacher of the Year at three occasions.

During his Technion presidency, Apeloig recruited more than 150 elite scholars and scientists worldwide to the Technion. He also established a number of interdisciplinary research centers such as the Russell Berrie Nanotechnology Institute. He also established the Lorry I. Lokey Interdisciplinary Center for Life Sciences and Engineering. In 2010 was inducted to the American Academy of Arts and Sciences. The same year he also became a recipient of the Frederic Stanley Kipping Award in Silicon Chemistry.

== Life and career ==
Apeloig was born in Bukhara, Uzbek SSR on 1 September 1944, after his family fled from the Nazis following the invasion of Poland in September 1939. In 1947, when he was three years old, the family immigrated to Israel. He served in the Nahal Brigade and the paratroopers between 1962 and 1964. He studied chemistry and physics at the Hebrew University of Jerusalem, and completed his undergraduate (receiving his BA in physics and chemistry in 1967, and his masters in 1969) and graduate education there, including a Ph.D. in chemistry in 1974. He conducted postdoctoral research at Princeton University with Paul v. R. Schleyer and collaborated with Nobel Laureate John A. Pople. Apeloig joined the faculty of the Technion in 1976 and in 1983 he was appointed a professor. He became the dean of the Faculty of Chemistry in 1995 until 2001 when he became the president of the Technion, replacing Amos Lapidot. In 2009 he was followed as president by Peretz Lavie.

Yitzhak Apeloig died in Haifa in 28 May 2026, at the age of 81.

== Awards ==
- 2011 – Officer's Cross of the Order of Merit of the Federal Republic of Germany from Bundespräsident Christian Wulff
- 2010 – Honorary Foreign Member of the American Academy of Arts and Sciences
- 2010 – American Chemical Society Fredric Stanely Kipping Award in Silicon Chemistry
- 2010 – Alexander von Humboldt – Lise Meitner Senior Research Award
- 2009 – Fellow, American Association for the Advancement of Science
- 2008 – Honorary Member, Mexican Academy of Sciences
- 2007 – Wacker Silicone Award
- 2006 – Honorary Doctorate of Science from the Technische Universität Berlin, Germany
- 2002 – C. A Coulson Lecturer, University of Georgia, Athens, USA
- 2002 – The Israel Chemical Society Prize
- 1997 – Distinguished Teacher Award by the Technion Student Association
- 1996 – Granted a Minerva Center in Computational Quantum Chemistry
- 1994–1999 – Alexander von Humboldt – Lise Meitner Senior Research Award
- 1993 – Distinguished Teacher Award by the Technion Student Association
- 1993 – Senior Scientist Exchange Fellow, Israel-Italy National Council for Research and Development
- 1991, 1993 – Henri Gutwirth Prize for Excellence in Research by the Technion
- 1991, 1999, 2010 – Japan Society for the Promotion of Science (JSPS), Senior Visiting Professor Award
- 1988 – Technion Award for Academic Excellence, Technion (The New England Prize)
- 1986 – Distinguished Teacher Award by the Technion Student Association
- 1986 – Louis Klein Visiting Professorship in Australian Universities
- 1985, 1991 – Deutscher Akademischer Austauschdienst (DAAD) Visiting Professor
- 1979 – Deutscher Akademischer Austauschdienst (DAAD) Fellowship
- 1977–1978 – Bat-Sheba de Rothschild Fellow
- 1974 – Yashinski Prize for Distinguished Ph.D. Thesis
- 1971 – Prize for Distinguished Student of the Dean of the Faculty of Sciences, Hebrew University
- 1965–1967 – Annual Prize for Distinction in Chemistry Studies, Hebrew University

== Publications ==
- Heinemann, Christoph; Müller, Thomas; Apeloig, Yitzhak; Schwarz, Helmut (1 January 1996). "On the Question of Stability, Conjugation, and "Aromaticity" in Imidazol-2-ylidenes and Their Silicon Analogs". Journal of the American Chemical Society. 118 (8): 2023–2038. Bibcode:1996JAChS.118.2023H. doi:10.1021/ja9523294. ISSN 0002-7863.
- Collins, John B.; Dill, James D.; Jemmis, Eluvathingal D.; Apeloig, Yitzhak; Schleyer, Paul v. R.; Seeger, Rolf; Pople, John A. (1976). "Stabilization of planar tetracoordinate carbon". Journal of the American Chemical Society. 98 (18): 5419–5427. Bibcode:1976JAChS..98.5419C. doi:10.1021/ja00434a001. ISSN 0002-7863.
- Luke, B. T.; Pople, J. A.; Krogh-Jespersen, M. B.; Apeloig, Y.; Karni, M.; Chandrasekhar, J.; Schleyer, Paul v. R. (1986). "A theoretical survey of unsaturated or multiply bonded and divalent silicon compounds. Comparison with carbon analogs". Journal of the American Chemical Society. 108 (2): 270–284. Bibcode:1986JAChS.108..270L. doi:10.1021/ja00262a014. ISSN 0002-7863.
