= Nir Tessler =

Israeli electrical engineer (born 1962)

- ניר טסלר
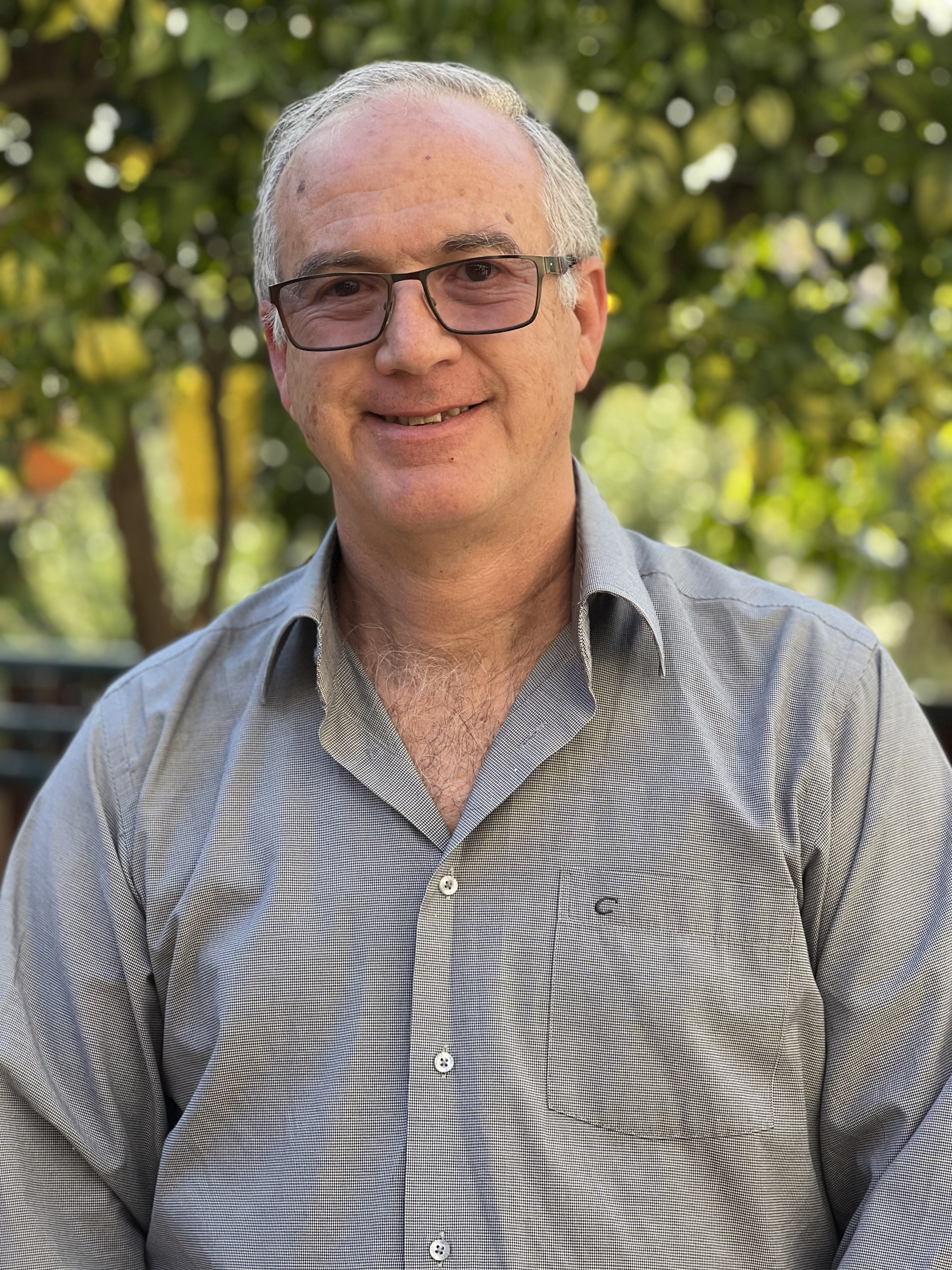
- Born: 1962 (age 63–64); Haifa, Israel
- Education: Technion
- Known for: Plastic electronics; Organic field-effect transistor; Near infrared nanocrystal LED
- Awards: Honorary fellow of the Chinese chemical society (2020); Fellow of the Royal society of chemistry (2020)
- Scientific career
- Fields: Optoelectronics; Device chemical physics; Thin-film field-effect transistors; Perovskite solar cell; Photovoltaics; Photo images; Nanocrystal devices
- Workplaces: Cavendish Laboratory; Technion
- Thesis: Dynamic Properties of Inverted QW Laser Structure (1995)
- Doctoral advisor: Gadi Eisenstein

Nir Tessler (Hebrew: ניר טסלר; born 1962) is the Barbara and Norman Seiden professor in the Faculty of Electrical and Computer Engineering and head of the Microelectronics and Nanoelectronics centers at the Technion - Israel Institute of Technology.

== Early life and education ==
Nir Tessler was born in Haifa, Israel. He studied at Hebrew Reali School, and served in the Israeli Air Force from 1980 to 1985.

Tessler received his B.Sc in electrical engineering in 1989 (Summa Cum Laude) and M.Sc in electrical engineering (1992), both from the Technion. His Ph.D. degree was received in 1995 from the Technion. Tessler authored the thesis Dynamic Properties of Inverted QW Laser Structure, under the supervision of Gadi Eisenstein.

== Career ==
Tessler was a research associate and later an EPSRC advanced fellow at the Cavendish Laboratory, Cambridge University, UK from 1995 to 1999. He then joined the faculty of electrical engineering at the Technion as a senior lecturer. Tessler became an associate professor in 2003, and a full professor in 2008. From 2010, Tessler is head of the Microelectronics and Nanoelectronics centers at the Technion.

As of April 2022, Tessler has supervised 27 graduate students, and authored over 200 scientific publications.

== Research ==
Tessler's research work focuses on new materials and the relation of their chemical and physics properties with device performance; Device chemical-physics and device structural designs. This includes light-matter interaction (including laser action and micro-cavities), transport of electrons, holes, and ions, electron-hole pairs (excitons), processing of devices (transistors, photo-images, detectors and solar cells).

In 1996 Tessler was the first to introduce a “plastic laser” based on semiconducting organic molecule (polymer). Two years later he initiated the construction of the first smart-pixel, which proved that thin flexible screens are feasible. In 2002 he showed that organic LEDs (OLEDs) can be made to emit light at a wavelength (“color”) that is relevant to fiber-based communication (i.e., at 1.3 micron). In 2006, he submitted a patent for a new transistor structure which had a vertical orientation where the transistor functions of gate, source, channel, and drain are stacked one on top of the other.

== Honors and awards ==
- 1995 The Rothschild Post Doctoral Fellowship
- 1999 Alon Fellowship
- 2009 Top 1% in the field of Chemistry. - Essential Science Indicators from Thomson Reuters
- 2020 Honorary fellow of the Chinese chemical society for “pioneering contributions in the field of conjugated polymer lasers, near infrared polymer LEDs, organic semiconductor charge transport, and vertical structure organic field effect transistor devices”
- 2020 Fellow of the Royal society of chemistry

== Selected articles ==
- N. Tessler and G. Eisenstein, On carrier injection and gain dynamics in quantum well lasers, IEEE Journal of Quantum Electronics, 1993, 29, 1586–1595.
- N. Tessler, G. J. Denton and R. H. Friend, Lasing from conjugated-polymer microcavities, Nature, 1996, 382, 695–697.
- G. J. Denton, N. Tessler, N. T. Harrison and R. H. Friend, Factors influencing stimulated emission from poly(p-phenylenevinylene), Physical Review Letters, 1997, 78, 733–736.
- H. Sirringhaus, N. Tessler and R. H. Friend, Integrated optoelectronic devices based on conjugated polymers, Science, 1998, 280, 1741–1744.
- N. Tessler, N. T. Harrison and R. H. Friend, High peak brightness polymer light-emitting diodes, Advanced Materials, 1998, 10, 64-+.
- V. Cleave, G. Yahioglu, P. Le Barny, R. H. Friend and N. Tessler, Harvesting singlet and triplet energy in polymer LEDs, Advanced Materials, 1999, 11, 285–288.
- N. Tessler, Lasers based on semiconducting organic materials, Advanced Materials, 1999, 11, 363–370.
- Y. Roichman and N. Tessler, Generalized Einstein relation for disordered semiconductors - Implications for device performance, Applied Physics Letters, 2002, 80, 1948–1950.
- N. Tessler, V. Medvedev, M. Kazes, S. H. Kan and U. Banin, Efficient near-infrared polymer nanocrystal light-emitting diodes, Science, 2002, 295, 1506–1508.
- M. Soreni-Harari, N. Yaacobi-Gross, D. Steiner, A. Aharoni, U. Banin, O. Millo and N. Tessler, Tuning energetic levels in nanocrystal quantum dots through surface manipulations, Nano Letters, 2008, 8, 678–684.
- N. Tessler, Y. Preezant, N. Rappaport and Y. Roichman, Charge Transport in Disordered Organic Materials and Its Relevance to Thin-Film Devices: A Tutorial Review, Advanced Materials, 2009, 21, 2741–2761.
- O. Solomeshch et al., "Ground-State Interaction and Electrical Doping of Fluorinated C-60 in Conjugated Polymers," Advanced Materials, vol. 21, no. 44, 0935–9648, pp. 4456-+, 2009
- H. Shekhar, O. Solomeshch, D. Liraz and N. Tessler, Low dark leakage current in organic planar heterojunction photodiodes, Applied Physics Letters, 2017, 111.
- H. Shekhar, A. Fenigstein, T. Leitner, B. Lavi, D. Veinger, and N. Tessler, "Hybrid image sensor of small molecule organic photodiode on CMOS – Integration and characterization," Sci Rep, vol. 10, no. 1, p. 7594, 2020.
