= Grand Technion Energy Program =

Program at Technion - Israel Institute of Technology

The emblem of the Technion

The Nancy and Stephen Grand Technion Energy Program (GTEP) or Grand Technion Energy Program was established in 2007 at Technion - Israel Institute of Technology, which is Israel's first university, founded in 1912.

== Overview ==
GTEP's stated aim is to bring together Technion's researchers to discover and tap alternative and renewable energy sources, promote more efficient energy use, and reduce the environmental damage caused by the production of fossil fuels.

GTEP is interdisciplinary, with members spanning the range from nano science through to applied engineering.

The stated GTEP mission is:

1. To support energy projects with global impact
2. To promote multidisciplinary cooperation
3. To build on Israel and Technion's existing strengths in energy research and application
4. To attract new faculty into energy research
5. To attract graduate students
6. To strengthen industrial & international cooperation
7. To raise awareness in Israel and across the world of energy issues

More than 40 faculty members from nine Technion faculties are involved in GTEP projects.

== GTEP's four-point strategy ==
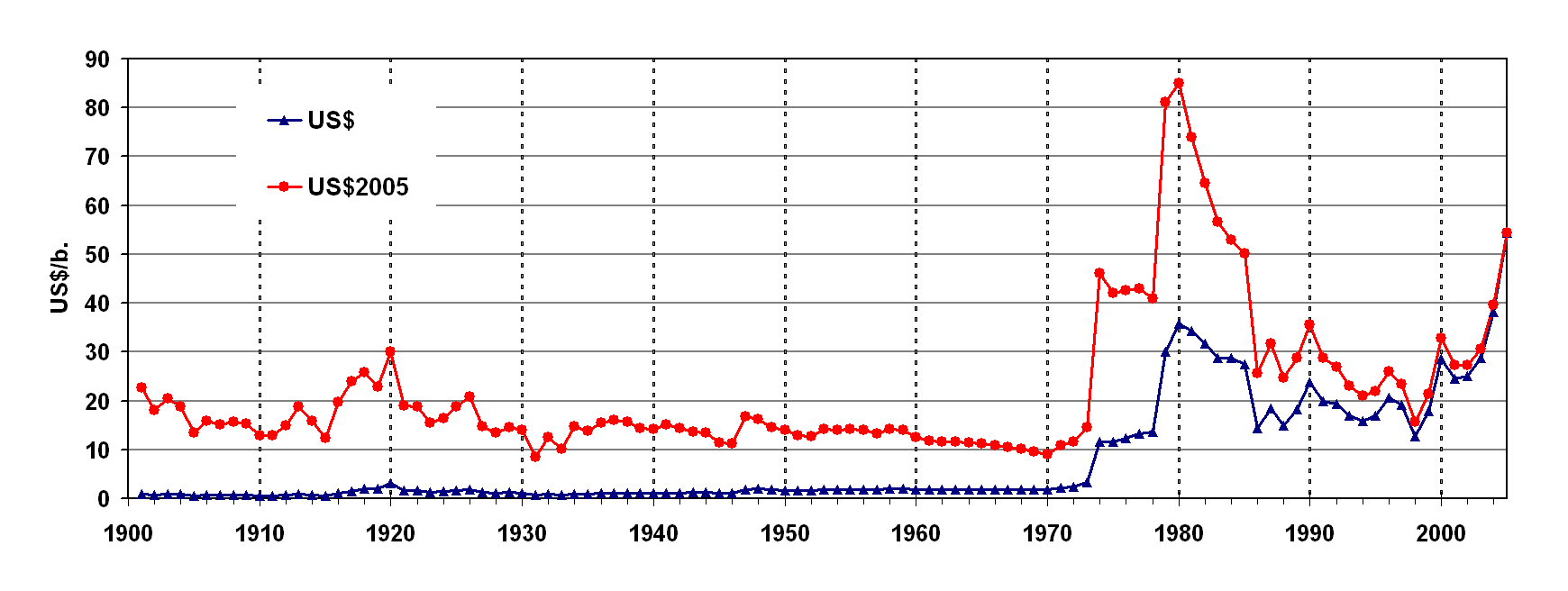
Oil prices 1900 int.

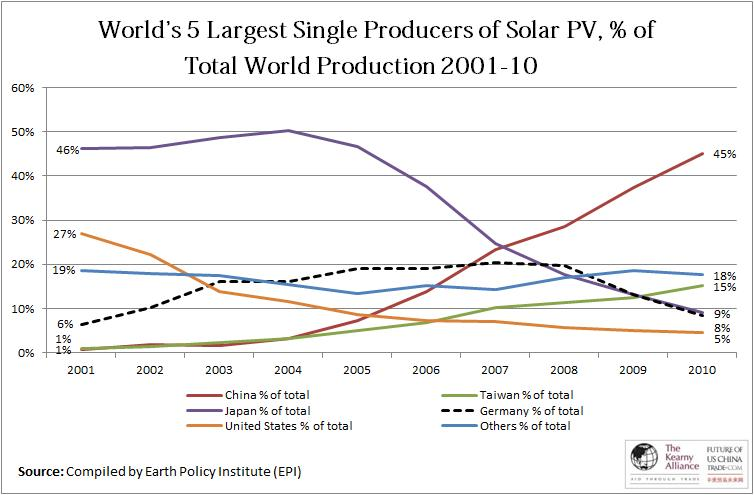
Five largest producers of solar photovoltaics, % of total world solar photovoltaic production (2001–2010).

Alternative fuels

- Non-carbon fuels
- Hydrogen technologies
- Biomass-based fuels

Renewable energy sources

- Solar thermal technologies
- Photovoltaic cells
- Wind power

Energy storage and conversion

- fuel cells
- batteries

Energy conservation

- Conservation-minded urban planning
- Insulation substances
- Smart windows that can deflect sunlight as needed
- Combustion processes

== National leadership ==
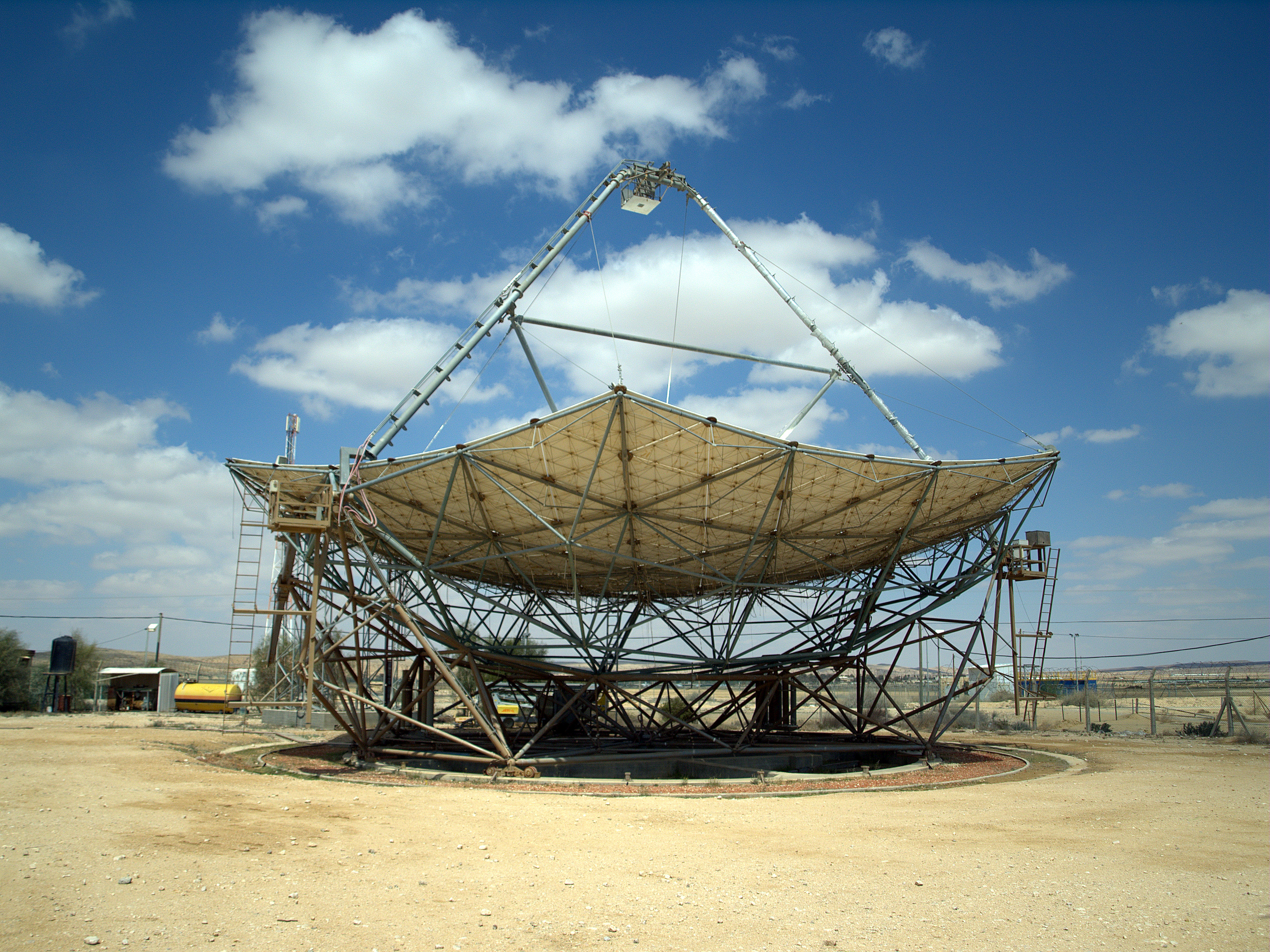
Solar dish at Ben-Gurion National Solar Energy Center in Israel.

In 2011, GTEP submitted the winning proposal to the Israel Science Foundation, through the framework of the Israeli Centers for Research Excellence (I-CORE). As proposal coordinator, GTEP is coordinating top researchers to advance research into Solar fuels from Technion, the Weizmann Institute of Science and Ben-Gurion University of the Negev. The I-CORE for Solar Fuels includes nine existing faculty members from each university and 3 new faculty members in each school (a total of 36 members).

== Notable GTEP faculty members ==
- Prof. Yoed Tsur, GTEP Director, Technion Faculty of Chemical Engineering.
- Prof. Gideon Grader, Founder and Former GTEP Director, Technion Faculty of Chemical Engineering.
- Prof. Avner Rothschild, Technion Faculty of Materials Engineering.
- Prof. Yair Ein-Eli, Technion Faculty of Materials
- Prof. Ilan Riess, Technion Faculty of Physics.
- Prof. Nir Tessler, Technion Faculty of Electrical Engineering.
- Prof. Gadi Schuster, Technion Faculty of Biology.
- Prof. Avner Rothschild, Technion Faculty of Materials Science and Engineering
- Prof. Lilac Amirav, Technion Schulich Faculty of Chemistry
- Prof. David Greenblatt, Technion Faculty of Mechanical Engineering .

== Technion faculties involved with GTEP ==
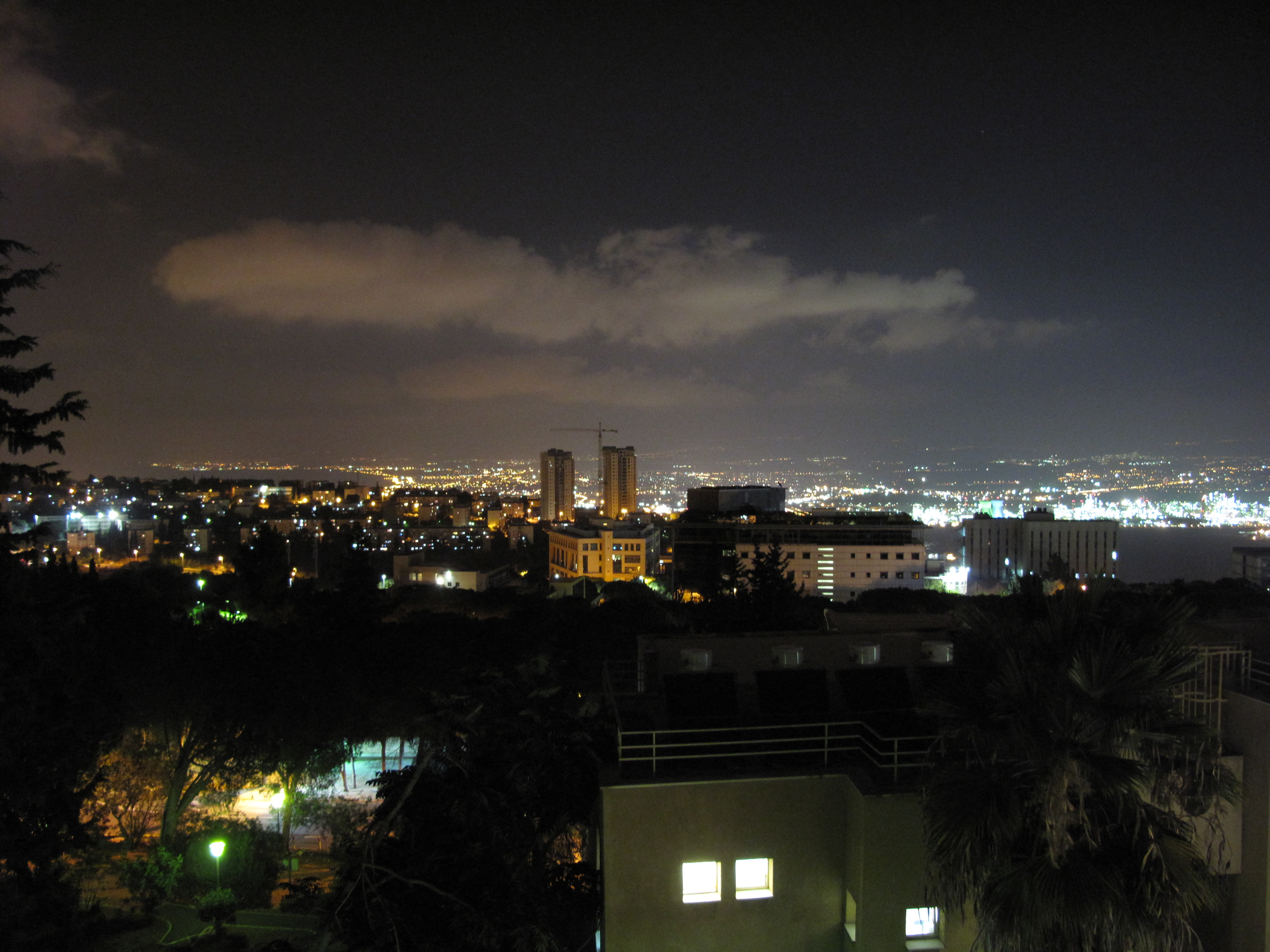
Wikimania 2011: view from the Technion dorms at night.

- Aerospace Engineering
- Architecture and Town Planning
- Biology
- Biotechnology and Food Engineering
- Chemical Engineering
- Chemistry
- Civil and Environmental Engineering
- Electrical Engineering
- Materials Engineering
- Mechanical Engineering
- Physics
- Mathematics

== GTEP International Graduate Studies Program ==
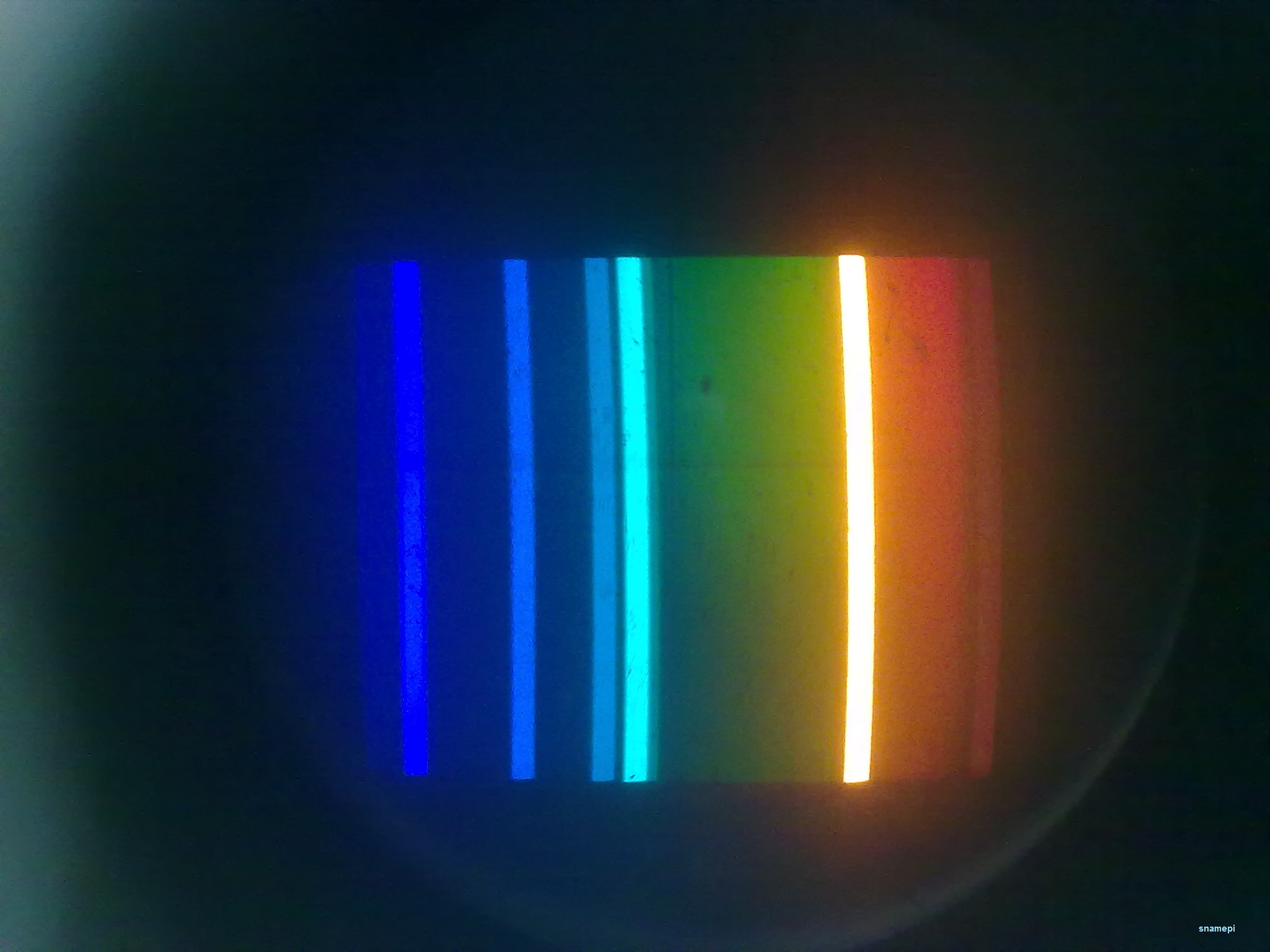
Helium Spectrum Technion.

GTEP houses Israel's only multidisciplinary graduate studies program in energy science and technology.

- MSc in Energy Engineering
- MSc in Energy
- PhD Program
