= Max Hecker =

- מקס הקר
- Born: Mordecai Hecker; 28 January 1879; Austro-Hungarian Empire
- Died: 12 June 1964 (aged 85)
- Occupation: civil engineer
- Known for: President of the Technion – Israel Institute of Technology

Mordecai "Max" Hecker (Hebrew: מקס הקר) was an Austrian-born Israeli President of the Technion – Israel Institute of Technology.

== Biography ==
Hecker was born in Austria, and was a civil engineer. He was the President of the Technion – Israel Institute of Technology from 1925 to 1927, succeeding Arthur Blok.
