= T3 Technion Technology Transfer =

Israeli technology transfer unit

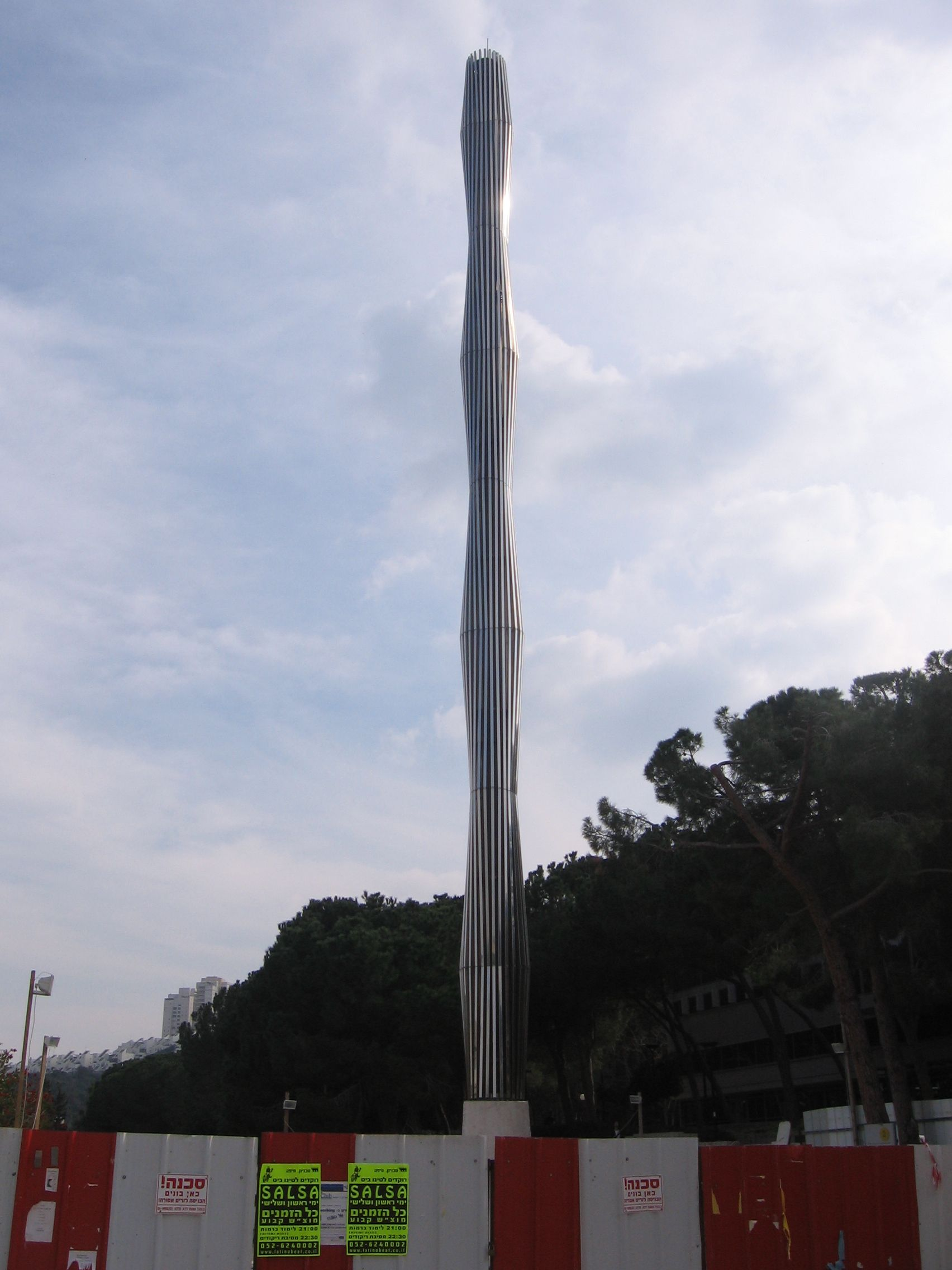
The Calatrava Obelisk at the heart of Technion City.

T3 Technion Technology Transfer is the technology transfer unit of the Technion – Israel Institute of Technology in Israel. The unit operates under the auspices of the Technion Research & Development Foundation.

== Overview ==
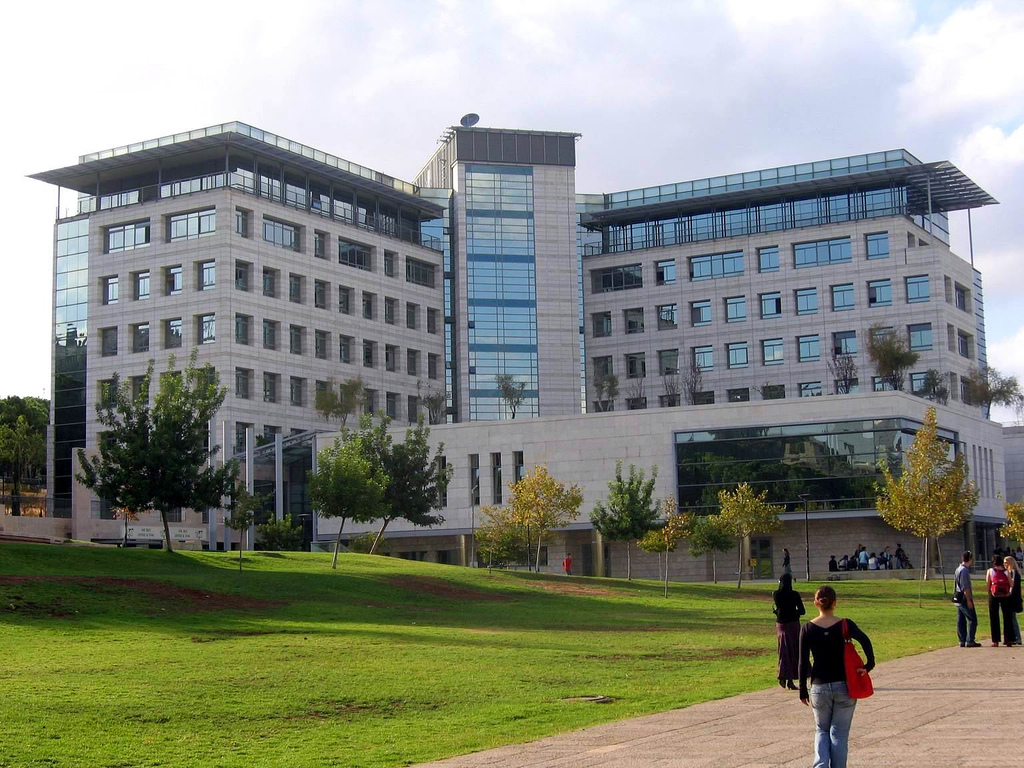
The Technion Computer Science Faculty.

T3 is staffed by an 11-member team whose focus is to commercialize new ideas in science and technology from Technion in Israel, by finding investors and entrepreneurs to develop commercial applications. This includes licensing intellectual property and the establishment of start-up companies. The team has been described as "the private sector's gateway to Technion innovation".

The name T3 was taken to represent the three 'T's' in the name Technion Technology Transfer, and to indicate that scientific breakthrough is taken to another dimension (cubed) when developed and applied as solutions in the real world.

Since 2005, the unit has been managed by Benjamin Soffer, a lawyer who has served on the board of directors of companies including Genegraft, SLP Ltd, Regentis Biomaterials, EORD, Guide-X and Slender Medical. Soffer was special advisor to Israel's Chief Scientist at the Israeli Ministry of Industry and Trade.

== Commercialization strategies ==
T3's strategy is to escort Technion technologies from the initial point of discovery, through the process of development and licensing, to the formation of ventures with industry. Commercialization strategies are tailored to the requirements of each venture, in order to enhance the market value and performance of Technion discoveries and increase their success in the global marketplace. This includes:

- Analysis of new inventions and concepts developed at the Technion
- Licensing technologies developed at the Technion
- Incorporation of spin-off companies based on Technion IP
- Participation in the board of directors of affiliated companies
- Negotiation and approval of the IP and business aspects of agreements with industry

== Major developments ==
=== Rasagiline ===
Rasagiline is a drug to treat Parkinson's disease discovered by Prof. Moussa B.H. Youdim of Technion and John Finberg. It was developed in collaboration with Teva Pharmaceuticals Ltd, in Israel. Having won U.S. Food and Drug Administration approval, the drug is now marketed worldwide as Azilect.

=== Start-ups formed with T 3 patents ===
- Mazor Surgical Technologies: Mazor has pioneered the development of miniature, semi robotic bone-mounted positioning systems for a range of orthopedic procedures.
- Biosense Inc.: A company that developed a 3-D cardiac mapping and navigation technology.
- FineTech: offering sophisticated chemical products and services to the pharmaceutical industry.
- Regents Biomaterials Ltd: a medical material development company involved in the cartilage repair market.
- Corindus Ltd: a company providing robotic technologies for catheterizing laboratories and radiology/special procedure suites.
- Pluristem Therapeutics: developer of human placental adherent stromal cells for commercial use in disease treatment.

=== Examples of T3 patents ===
- Novel hypergolic fuel
- Source of intense coherent high-frequency radiation
- Three-dimensional video scanner
- Highly sensitive, real-time structural monitoring
- Compact direction finding antenna
- Silicon air batteries
- GeomCore - outstanding 3D graphics
- Adaptive queue management (software and algorithms)
- Tandem eletrocyte fuel cell
- Learning control scheme for hybrid vehicles

== Programs ==
=== Entrepreneur in residence program ===
The unit runs an Entrepreneur In Residence program, in which global entrepreneurs are recruited and are given the chance to license new Technion technologies. The program normally requires a minimal amount of equity and the presentation of a business plan. As part of its effort to attract entrepreneurs, the group uses its network of venture capitalists, Incubators, head-hunting firms and service providers.

=== Internal applicable research funds ===
One challenge in technology transfer is the gap between early research products, and the level of evidence investors need to support further research. The Technion's internal applicable research funds are aimed at bridging this gap by taking promising projects beyond the proof of concept stage.

=== Awards ===
The Technion awards researchers, inventions, developments and publications from its scientists that have a profit potential. The goal of the award is to encourage entrepreneurship in research. The researchers are rated based on commercial applicability (such as potential market share), and technological maturity.

=== The Technion network ===
The American Technion Society and other Technion societies worldwide form an international network of supporters. T3 draws on this network for expertise in its commercialization efforts.

== Outside Activities ==
=== Webinars ===
The Technion has initiated a webinar program aimed at presenting Technion innovations to an audience of investors, industry leaders, entrepreneurs, corporate executives, in-licensing officers and service providers. The purpose of this program is to increase visibility and to assist in marketing and commercialization efforts. Independently, T3 maintains an active presence in the social media on LinkedIN, Facebook and Twitter.

=== MBA – global patent course ===
This program is the result of a combined effort by the Dingman Center for Entrepreneurship at the University of Maryland, T3 and Technion's MBA program. Within this initiative, MBA students (an equal amount of Israeli and American students from Maryland University and Harvard University), collaborate on a business plan aimed at commercializing patents and technologies developed by Technion researchers. The course offers hands-on experience in commercialization and starting a company involving a real-life innovation. At the end of the course, students present their business plans to a group of venture capitalists and entrepreneurs.

=== Internal technology transfer seminars ===
The group conducts seminars and workshops to Technion faculty and graduate students dealing with different aspects of commercialization, e.g., patenting, entrepreneurship, finance, fund raising, licensing, company formation

=== Professional conferences ===
The members of the team present in national and international conferences related to commercialization, licensing, and technology transfer. These include the Israeli, European and US Biome conferences, AUTM conferences, and Nanotechnology conferences.

== AMIT ==
The Technion is the first university outside of the U.S. selected by Alfred E. Mann to be a part of his network of Alfred Mann Institutes (AMIs). The Alfred Mann Institute at the Technion (AMIT) was established with an endowment exceeding US$100 million. Among the patents developed by AMIT is the electronic nose to sniff out cancer, invented by Hossam Haick
