= Uri Sivan =

Israeli physicist

- אורי סיון
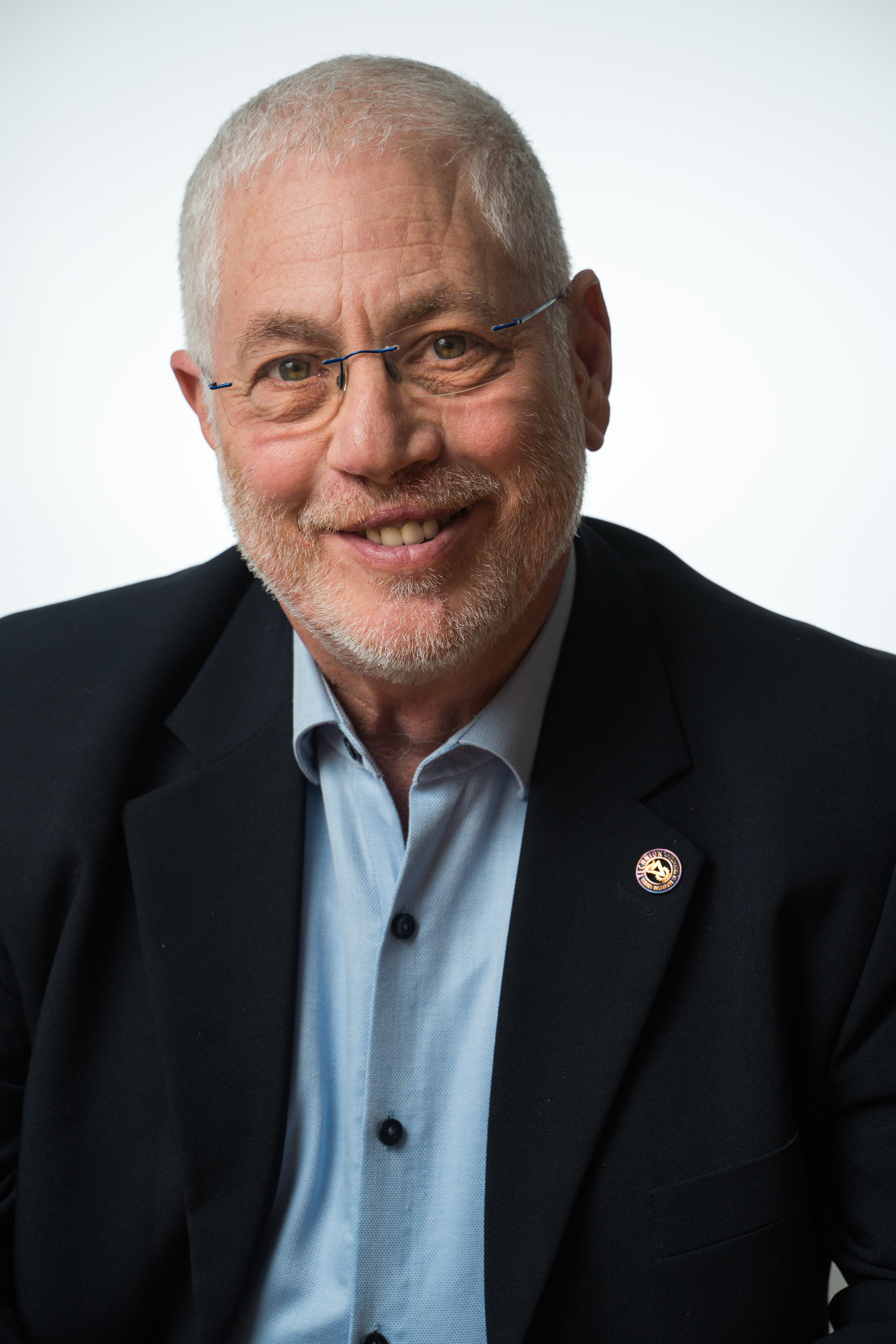
- Uri Sivan, 2019
- Born: 1955 (age 70–71)
- Education: Tel Aviv University (BSc, MSc, PhD)
- Occupation: physicist
- Known for: 17th President of the Technion – Israel Institute of Technology; Bertoldo Badler Chair in the Technion's Faculty of Physics
- Scientific career
- Doctoral students: Kinneret Keren

Uri Sivan (Hebrew: אורי סיון; born 1955) is an Israeli physicist who is the 17th president of the Technion – Israel Institute of Technology. He is also the holder of the Bertoldo Badler Chair in the Technion's Faculty of Physics.

== Biography ==
Uri Sivan's parents immigrated to Mandatory Palestine from Poland in 1936. They studied at the Technion – Israel Institute of Technology after being banned from European universities because they were Jewish.

Sivan served as a pilot in the Israeli Air Force.

Sivan has a BSc in Physics and Mathematics, and an MSc and PhD in physics from Tel Aviv University.

Sivan lives in Haifa, Israel. He is married and has three children.

== Academic career ==
In 1991, after three years at IBM’s T. J. Watson Research Center in New York State, Sivan joined the Faculty of Physics at the Technion – Israel Institute of Technology, and became the holder of the Bertoldo Badler Chair.

Sivan set up and led the Russell Berrie Nanotechnology Research Institute at Technion from 2005 to 2010, and in 2017 he set up the National Advisory Committee for Quantum Science and Technology of the Council for Higher Education's Planning and Budgeting Committee.

In September 2019, Sivan became the 17th President of the Technion – Israel Institute of Technology, replacing Peretz Lavie.

== Awards and recognition ==
Sivan was awarded the Israel Academy of Sciences Bergmann Prize, the Mifal Hapais Landau Prize for the Sciences and Research, the Rothschild Foundation Bruno Prize, the Technion's Hershel Rich Innovation Award, and the Taub Award for Excellence in Research.
