= Russell Berrie Nanotechnology Institute =

Israeli technology research institute

Coordinates: 32°46′39″N 35°01′18″E

- Parent institution: Technion
- Founder: Russell Berrie
- Established: 2005
- Focus: Nanotechnology; Nanoscience
- Director: Yeshayahu Talmon
- Faculty: 110
- Location: Haifa, Israel
- Website: rbni.technion.ac.il

The Russell Berrie Nanotechnology Institute (RBNI) was established in January 2005 as a joint endeavour of the Russell Berrie Foundation, the government of Israel and the Technion, Israel Institute of Technology. It is one of the largest academic programs in Israel and is among the largest nanotechnology centers in the world.

Prof. Yeshayahu Talmon of the Technion Faculty of Chemical Engineering is the Director of RBNI since 2010, when he took over from Prof. Uri Sivan.

RBNI has over 110 faculty members and approximately 300 graduate students and postdoctoral fellows under its auspices at Technion. Its multidisciplinary activities span 14 different faculties.

== Research areas ==
The key research areas are the various fields of nanoscience and nanotechnology: Nanoelectronics, Nanooptics, Nanomaterials, Nanomechanics, Nanomedicine.

== Technion faculties ==
- Aerospace Engineering
- Biology
- Biomedical Engineering
- Biotechnology & Food Engineering
- Chemical Engineering
- Chemistry
- Civil & Environmental Engineering
- Computer Science
- Electrical Engineering
- Materials Engineering
- Mathematics
- Mechanical Engineering
- Medicine
- Physics

== Facilities ==
=== Special centers and cooperative facilities ===
The institute contains the Sara and Moshe Zisapel Nanoelectronics Center, equipped with state-of-the-art clean rooms and individual labs. It complements the Wolfson Microelectronics Centre with approximately 700 m2 of clean rooms.

In cooperation with the Technion Lorry I. Lokey Center for Life Science and Engineering, RBNI has invested in equipment facilitating advanced mechanical characterization and manipulation of tissue and tissue scaffolds, and bio-rheology.

=== Special instrumentation ===
The institute has a top-of-the-line Transmission Electron Microscope (TEM) (0.07 nm resolution), an additional TEM, Environmental Scanning Electron Microscope (ESEM) and advanced facilities for sample preparation including the Dual Focused Ion Beam. There is now also a new cryo TEM and a new high resolution cryo SEM. A UHV Scanning Tunneling Microscope (STM), Near Field Scanning Optical Microscope (NSOM), and Time of Flight Secondary Ion Mass Spectrometry (TOFSIMS) are now also available.

Colloidal and molecular characterization equipment has been grouped under one roof and supplemented with small angle X-ray scattering and X-ray diffraction capabilities, as well as spectroscopy capabilities in solution.

A cluster supercomputer has been installed facilitating parallel computation, and services researchers from several faculties.

== Graduate program ==
The 'Norman Seiden Multidisciplinary Graduate Program in Nanoscience and Nanotechnology was launched in October 2005 and expanded in October 2006 to include a PhD program.

The science involving nanometric systems and the technology derived from them involves the convergence of know-how from numerous fields. The Program offers a core curriculum exposing students to the varied fields of nano science and endows them with the necessary knowledge in the life sciences (Biology and Medicine), the exact sciences (Chemistry and Physics), and engineering (Electrical, Materials, Chemical, Mechanical, Biomedical, Biotechnology and more).

The students are exposed to a broad curriculum covering topics from life sciences, physical sciences, and engineering and the individual curriculum reflects the student's individual background. The broad education requires five semesters for MSc compared with the usual four, with the first two semesters mostly devoted to filling gaps in the required background. In 2010, RBNI added its international graduate program in nano science and technology.

== Winter schools ==
RBNI winter schools in Nanoscience and Nanotechnology attract participants from around the world. Following the success of the 2008 winter school, the second winter school was held in February 2010 in Ein Gedi near the Dead Sea. Both were organized by a dedicated committee of 15 lecturers, and approximately 140 graduate students from Technion and other Israeli academic institutions.

== Ties with industry ==
Strengthening contacts with Israeli industry is a stated RBNI priority. Dozens of meetings with firms have taken place over the past 5 years, including open days with companies such as Intel, IBM, Elbit, Israel Aircraft Industry (IAI), Applied Materials, and more.

The investment in capital equipment at the institute has served approximately 120 research groups from industry that used this equipment over the past 5 years. Approximately 110 cooperative projects with industry were launched via programs such as Magneton, Nofar, participation in MAGNET consortia, participation in defense projects and more. RBNI has filed more than 104 patent applications.

== Outreach ==
In cooperation with the Technion Youth Activity section, the institute initiated a nano education program for junior and high-school students in Israel. As part of this program an “Introduction to Nano” lecture was developed and introduced to youth from different schools in Israel visiting the Technion Youth activity section. An additional lecture was developed in 2008 on routes to new, denser information storage strategies.

The "nano bible" created at the Russell Berrie Nanotechnology Institute was originally produced to demonstrate the current miniaturization capabilities as part of the effort to attract high school students to science and technology. It was later given by Israel President Shimon Peres to Pope Benedict XVI, on his visit to Jerusalem. RBNI is one of the first Israeli research institutes to create an active presence in the social media, on Facebook and Twitter.
