= Arthur Blok =

English electrical engineer and academic (1882-1974)

- ארתור בלוק
- Born: 19 March 1882; Hornsey, North London
- Died: 14 October 1974 (aged 92)
- Education: University College London (BSc)
- Known for: First administrative head (or Principal, as then called) of the Technion – Israel Institute of Technology
- Awards: Officer of the Order of the British Empire

Arthur Blok (Hebrew: ארתור בלוק; March 19, 1882 – October 14, 1974) was the British-born first administrative head (or Principal, as he was then called) of the Technion – Israel Institute of Technology, in Haifa, Israel (then Mandatory Palestine), from 1924 to 1925.

== Biography ==
Blok was born in Hornsey, North London, and attended Owen's School. He was an electrical engineering graduate of University College London (BSc). He was personal assistant to Professor Ambrose Fleming.

Blok was the first administrative head (or Principal, as he was then called) of the Technion, from 1924 to 1925. He was succeeded by Max Hecker.

He was appointed OBE in 1945. Blok died on 14 October 1974, aged 94.
