= Zehev Tadmor =

Israeli chemical engineer

- זאב תדמור
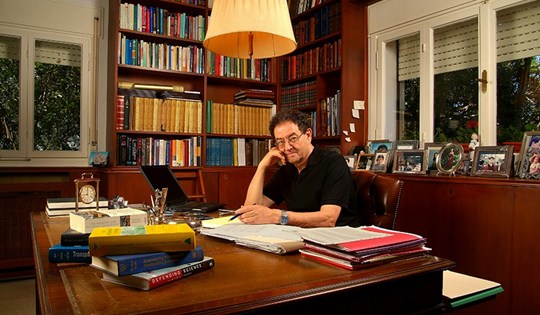
- Born: 1937 (age 88–89)
- Education: Technion-Israel Institute of Technology (BSc and MSc in chemical engineering); Stevens Institute of Technology (Doctorate in chemical engineering)
- Known for: Distinguished Professor, President Emeritus, and Chairman of the Technion-Israel Institute of Technology; Chairman of the Samuel Neaman Institute for Advanced Studies in Science and Technology
- Awards: Emet Prize (2005)

Zehev Tadmor (Hebrew: זאב תדמור; born 1937) is a retired Israeli chemical engineer who has served as distinguished professor, president, and chairman of the Technion-Israel Institute of Technology. He is also chairman of the Samuel Neaman Institute for Advanced Studies in Science and Technology, a policy research center. His main research interest is polymer and plastics engineering and processing. He won the Emet Prize in 2005.

== Biography ==
Tadmor received his BSc and MSc degrees in chemical engineering from the Technion-Israel Institute of Technology, and his doctorate in chemical engineering from the Stevens Institute of Technology in New Jersey.

Tadmor's main research interest is polymer and plastics engineering and processing. He has published three books and 75 papers in the field.

He worked for the Western Electric Company as a Senior Research Engineer, and then joined the Technion Faculty of Chemical Engineering in 1968. In 1975 Tadmor was appointed a Technion full professor, and in 1988 a Distinguished Technion Professor in the Department of Chemical Engineering. From 1984 to 1988 he served as Dean of the Department of Chemical Engineering.

Tadmor served as President of The Technion from 1990 to 1998. He is Chairman of the Technion-Israel Institute of Technology.

He is also Chairman of the Samuel Neaman Institute for Advanced Studies in Science and Technology, a policy research center.

== Accolades ==
Tadmor was elected a member of the US National Academy of Engineering in 1991 for creative research and his influence on the practice of polymer processing. He is also an elected member of the Israel Academy of Sciences.

He was inducted into the Polymer Processing Hall of Fame in 1993, and received the Rotary Prize for "Outstanding Contributions to Higher Education in Israel". Tadmor was awarded an Honorary Doctorate in Industrial Chemistry from the University of Bologna in 1995, and received the Society of Plastics Engineers of the USA "Extrusion Division Distinguished Service Award" and "Outstanding Achievement Award in Plastics Engineering and Technology". He won the Emet Prize in 2005 in Exact Sciences in the field of chemical engineering "for his original and pioneering contribution to the field of polymer processing, transforming it into a new and important engineering discipline, and for his academic leadership as a pre-eminent mentor and researcher in chemical engineering in Israel."
