= List of presidents of the Technion =

Yaakov Dori first Chief of the General Staff of the Israel Defense Forces and 7th president of the Techion

The Technion – Israel Institute of Technology in Haifa, Israel, has had 16 presidents and directors in more than a century of history, as of 2025.

The following is a list of presidents of the Technion ordered by date:

1. Arthur Blok (1924–1925)
2. Eng. Max Hecker (1925–1927)
3. Shmuel Pewsner (1927–1929)
4. Prof. Aharon Tcherniavsky (1927–1929)
5. Prof. Joseph Breuer (1930–1931)
6. Dr. Shlomo Kaplansky (1931–1950)
7. Lt. Gen. (Res.) Yaakov Dori (1951–1965)
8. Alexander Goldberg (1965–1973)
9. Maj. Gen. (Res.) Amos Horev (1973–1982)
10. Prof. Josef Singer (1982–1986)
11. Dr. Max W. Reis (1986–1990)
12. Prof. Zehev Tadmor (1990–1998)
13. Maj. Gen. (Res.) Amos Lapidot (1998–2001)
14. Prof. Yitzhak Apeloig (2001–2009)
15. Prof. Peretz Lavie (2009–2019)
16. Prof. Uri Sivan (2019–present)

== See also ==
- History of the Technion
