= Shabtai Rosenne =

Israeli diplomat (1917–2010)

- שבתאי רוזן
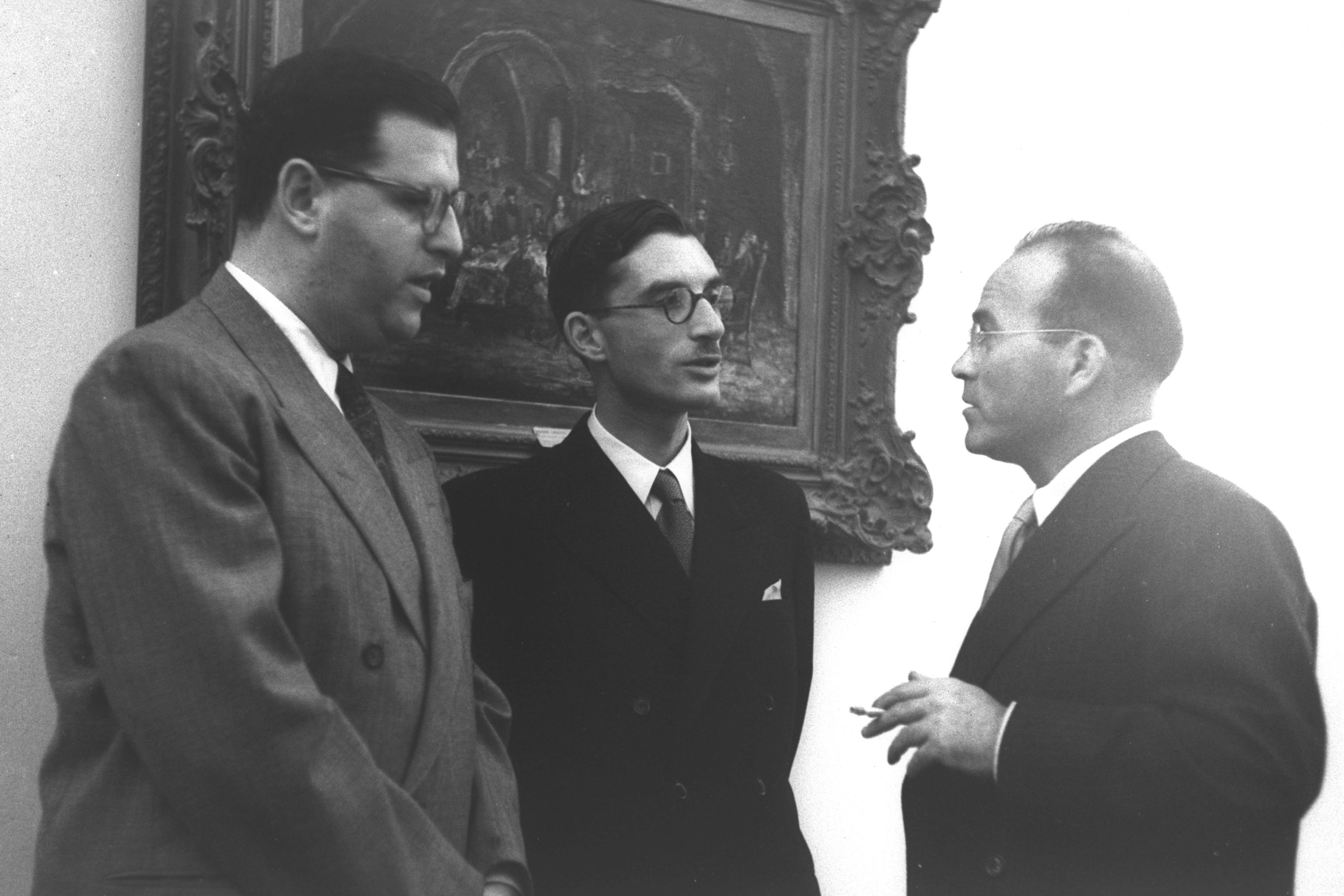
- Israeli foreign ministry officials (from left) Abba Eban, Shabtai Rosenne, and Reuven Shiloah, July 1949.

Legal adviser for the Israeli Ministry of Foreign Affairs
- In office 1948–1967
- Preceded by: position established
- Succeeded by: Theodor Meron

Personal details
- Born: Sefton Wilfred David Rowson; 24 November 1917 London, England
- Died: 21 September 2010 (aged 92) Jerusalem
- Education: University of London (LLB); Hebrew University of Jerusalem (PhD)
- Occupation: Professor of International Law
- Awards: 1960 Israel Prize for Jurisprudence; 1999 Manley O. Hudson Award for International Law and Jurisprudence; 2004 Hague Prize for International Law

Shabtai Rosenne (Hebrew: שבתאי רוזן; 24 November 1917 – 21 September 2010) was a Professor of International Law and an Israeli diplomat. Rosenne was awarded the 1960 Israel Prize for Jurisprudence, the 1999 Manley O. Hudson Medal for International Law and Jurisprudence, the 2004 Hague Prize for International Law and the 2007 Distinguished Onassis Scholar Award. He was the leading scholar of the World Court - the PCIJ and ICJ and had a widely recognized expertise in treaty law, state responsibility, self-defence, UNCLOS and other issues of international law.

Rosenne authored some 200 articles and essays, as well as The Law and Practice of the International Court in 1997 and 2006, United Nations Convention on the Law of the Sea, 1982: a Commentary in 2002, Provisional Measures in International Law: the International Court of Justice and the International Tribunal for the Law of the Sea in 2005, and Essays on International Law and Practice in 2007.In June 2010, he was appointed to the Israeli special independent public Turkel Commission of Inquiry into the Gaza flotilla raid.

== Biography ==
Sefton Wilfred David Rowson (later Shabtai Rosenne) was born in London, United Kingdom, the son of Harry Rowson. In 1938, Rosenne completed his academic studies in law (LL.B.; University of London), studying naval law. In 1959, he earned a PhD from the Hebrew University of Jerusalem.

He served from 1940 to 1946 in the Royal Air Force. He then worked in the Political Department of the Jewish Agency, initially in London and subsequently in Jerusalem, for two years. He was married (1940) with Esther Schultz, they had two sons, Jonathan and Daniel . Rosenne died of a heart attack in Jerusalem on 21 September 2010 at the age of 92.

== Diplomatic career ==
With the approach of the end of the British Mandate in Palestine, Rosenne was appointed to the Legal Secretariat of the Situation Committee, which helped create the administrative apparatus of the new State of Israel. After the declaration of the State, he joined the Israeli Foreign Ministry. From 1948 to 1967, Rosenne served as a Legal Adviser to the Foreign Ministry. Among other things, he was as a member of the Israeli delegation to the 1949 Armistice Agreements. He was also a member of the UN-established International Law Commission from 1962 to 1971, and has been a member of the Institut de Droit International since 1963.

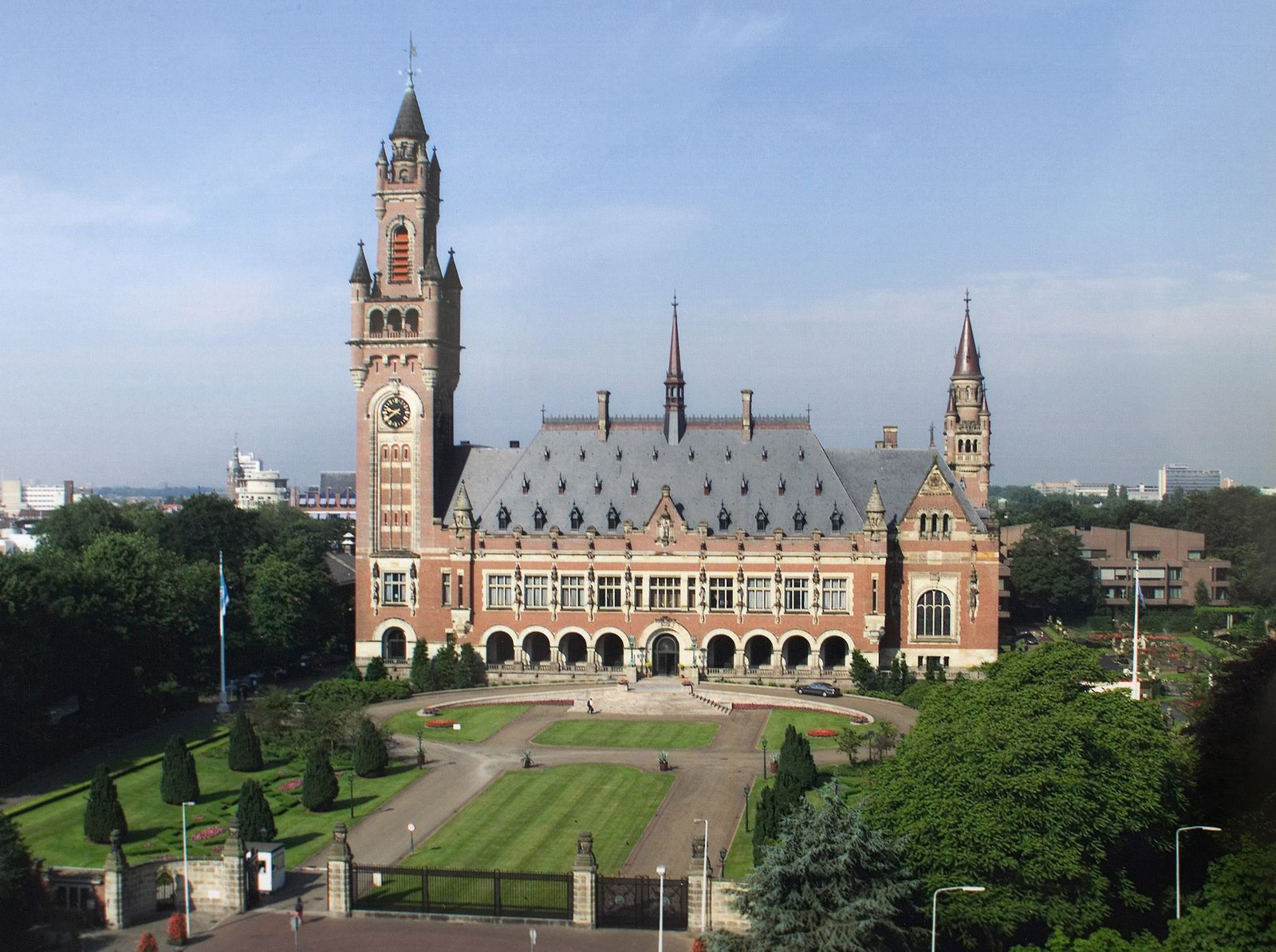
Seat of the Permanent Court of Arbitration: The Peace Palace ("Vredespaleis"), The Hague

In 1960, he was appointed to the rank of Ambassador. He served as Deputy Permanent Representative of Israel to the United Nations in New York from 1967 to 1971, and Israel's Permanent Representative to the United Nations and other international organizations in Geneva from 1971 to 1974. In 1972, a letter bomb was sent to him, which was defused. He was appointed Ambassador-at-Large in 1974.

He was Vice Chairman of Delegation to the First and Second United Nations Conference on the Law of the Sea, and from 1973 to 1982 he was Chairman of the Delegation to the Third UN Conference on the Law of the Sea and a member of the Drafting Committee of the UNCLOS.

In 1993, he acted as Serbia's chief legal advisor. From 1994 to 1996 he was a Member of the Permanent Court of Arbitration in The Hague. He was also a member of the Court's Steering Committee.

== Academic career ==
He returned to Britain and lectured in international law and naval law at the Royal Naval College in Greenwich, London, from 1946 to 1947. Rosenne taught at The Hague Academy of International Law in 1954 and 2001. He became a member of the Institute of International Law in 1963.

After leaving public service, Rosenne became a member of the faculty (with the rank of Professor) at Bar Ilan University. He also taught at the Rhodes Oceans Academy in Greece, as the Arthur Goodhart Professor in Legal Science in the University of Cambridge, the Bella van Zuylen Professor in the University of Utrecht, and visiting professor in international law at the University of Amsterdam and the University of Virginia.

In 2001, after Rosenne was invited to teach his General Course on The Perplexities of Modern International Law, he became a member of the Hague Academy of International Law. He has also served as a consultant to various governments, including to the United States and Yugoslavia (in the Bosnian Genocide case) before the International Court of Justice (ICJ), and to Japan and Suriname in their Arbitrations in the ICSID and PCA respectively.

He wrote United Nations Convention on the Law of the Sea, 1982: a Commentary in 2002, Provisional Measures in International Law: the International Court of Justice and the International Tribunal for the Law of the Sea in 2005, and Essays on International Law and Practice in 2007. The first edition of Rosenne's monumental treatise on The Law and Practice of the International Court was handed to then ICJ President Stephen M. Schwebel and UN Legal Counsel Hans Corell in November 1997. The second edition was handed by Rosenne to ICJ President Rosalyn Higgins on the eve of the Court's 60th Anniversary in April 2006 and it was praised in solemn tribute of ICJ President Hisashi Owada to the memory of Professor Rosenne of 11 October 2010 as "an indispensable guide to the role and functioning of the Court as the principal judicial organ of the United Nations". As President Owada at his tribute's p. 10 added: "Rosenne's keen interest in and enthusiasm about the work of the Court, which continued unabated throughout his life, was greatly appreciated by all Members of the Court, past and present".

== Turkel Commission of Inquiry ==
Routes of Gaza-bound flotilla (green) and Israeli Navy (orange)

On 14 June 2010, Rosenne was appointed to the Israeli special independent public Turkel Commission of Inquiry into the Gaza flotilla raid.

The commission was established to investigate whether Israel's actions in preventing the arrival of ships in Gaza were in accordance with international law. Its focus included the security considerations for imposing a naval blockade on the Gaza Strip; the conformity of the naval blockade with the rules of international law; the conformity of the actions during the raid to principles of international law; and the actions taken by those who organized and participated in the flotilla and their identities.

Also appointed to the commission were former Israeli Supreme Court Justice, Jacob Turkel, and former Technion University President, Amos Horev, as well two other members, Miguel Deutch and Reuven Merchav, added in July 2010. In addition, two foreign observers were appointed to the commission, former First Minister of Northern Ireland, David Trimble, and former head of the Canadian military's judiciary, Judge Advocate General, Ken Watkin, authorized to take part in hearings and discussions, but not to vote on final conclusions.

== Awards and recognition ==
- In 1960, Rosenne was awarded the Israel Prize, in jurisprudence.
- In 1994, he was honoured by the American Society of International Law, and has been elected to serve as its honorary president.
- In 1994, he was also honoured with the Sharett Prize.
- In 1999, he was awarded the Manley O. Hudson Medal for International Law and Jurisprudence.
- In 2004, he received the Hague Prize for International Law.
- In 2007, Rosenne received Distinguished Onassis Scholar Award from the Rhodes Oceans Academy in Greece.
- Solemn Tribute of ICJ President Hisashi Owada to the memory of Professor Shabtai Rosenne, in Nicaragua v. Colombia (Costa Rica's Intervention) Hearings, CR 2010/12, at 10 of 11 October 2010 and ICJ Cases and UN 6th Committee Pays Respect to the Israeli Jurist Shabtai Rosenne of 6 October 2010 and Shabtai Rosenne Obituary: Eminent International Lawyer, Teacher and Israeli Diplomat by Malcolm Shaw of 12 October 2010 and in Memoriam Shabtai Rosenne (24 November 1917 – 21 September 2010) by B. Kwiatkowska, in 26 IJMCL 1-3 (2011 No.1) & NILOS Papers and in Memoriam, 105 AJIL 91-93 2011/No.1 by Former ICJ President Stephen M. Schwebel and The Telegraph (UK) Obituary

== Published works ==
=== Books ===
- Essays on International Law and Practice, Shabtai Rosenne, Martinus Nijhoff Publishers, 2007, ISBN 90-04-15536-8
- Interpretation, Revision, and other Recourse from International Judgments and Awards, Shabtai Rosenne, Martinus Nijhoff Publishers, 2007, ISBN 90-04-15727-1
- The Law and Practice of the International Court, 1920–2005: The Court and the United Nations, Shabtai Rosenne, Yaėl Ronen, Martinus Nijhoff Publishers, 2006, ISBN 90-04-15019-6
- Provisional Measures in International Law: the International Court of Justice and the International Tribunal for the Law of the Sea, Shabtai Rosenne, Oxford University Press, 2005, ISBN 0-19-926806-1
- The Perplexities of Modern International Law, Shabtai Rosenne, Hague Academy of International Law, Martinus Nijhoff Publishers, 2004, ISBN 90-04-13692-4
- The World Court: What it is and how it Works, Shabtai Rosenne, Terry D. Gill, Erik Jaap Molenaar, Alex G. Oude Elferink, 6th Edition, United Nations Publications, 2003, ISBN 90-04-13816-1
- United Nations Convention on the Law of the Sea, 1982: a Commentary, Myron H. Nordquist, Satya N. Nandan, Shabtai Rosenne, Michael W. Lodge, Martinus Nijhoff Publishers, 2002, ISBN 90-411-1981-7
- The development of the regime for deep seabed mining, Satya N. Nandan, Michael W. Lodge, Shabtai Rosenne, Kluwer Law, 2002, ISBN 978-976-610-503-7
- The Hague Peace Conferences of 1899 and 1907 and International Arbitration: Reports and Documents, Shabtai Rosenne, Permanent Court of Arbitration, Cambridge University Press, 2001, ISBN 90-6704-134-3
- The Law and Practice of the International Court, 1920–1996: Jurisdiction, Shabtai Rosenne, Martinus Nijhoff Publishers, 1997, ISBN 90-411-0264-7
- Intervention in the International Court of Justice, Shabtai Rosenne, Martinus Nijhoff Publishers, 1993, ISBN 0-7923-2109-X
- An International Law Miscellany, Shabtai Rosenne, Martinus Nijhoff Publishers, 1993, ISBN 0-7923-1742-4
- The International Law Commission's Draft Articles on State Responsibility: Part 1, Articles 1–35, Shabtai Rosenne, United Nations International Law Commission, Martinus Nijhoff Publishers, 1991, ISBN 0-7923-1179-5

=== Articles ===
- "The International Court of Justice New Practice Directions", Shabtai Rosenne, 8 The Law and Practice of International Courts and Tribunals 171, 2009
- "The International Court and the United Nations: Reflections on the Period 1946–1954", Shabtai Rosenne, International Organization 244, 2009
- "Travaux Préparatoires", Shabtai Rosenne, 12 International and Comparative Law Quarterly 1378, 2008
- "When is a Final Clause Not a Final Clause", Shabtai Rosenne, 98 The American Journal of International Law 546, 2004
- "The Three Central Elements of Modern International Law", 17 Hague Yearbook of International Law 3, 2004
- "The International Court of Justice: Revision of Articles 79 and 80 of the Rules of Court", Shabtai Rosenne, 14 Leiden Journal of International Law 77, 2001
- "The International Tribunal for the Law of the Sea: Survey for 1999", Shabtai Rosenne, 15 The International Journal of Marine and Coastal Law 443, 2000
- "International Tribunal for the Law of the Sea: 1998 Survey", Shabtai Rosenne, 14 The International Journal of Marine and Coastal Law 453, 1999
- "International Tribunal for the Law of the Sea: 1996–97 Survey", Shabtai Rosenne, 13 The International Journal of Marine and Coastal Law 487, 1998
- "State Responsibility and International Crimes: Further Reflections on Article 19 of the Draft Articles on State Responsibility", Shabtai Rosenne, 30 N.Y.U. Journal of International Law & Policy 145, 1997–98
- "Geography in international maritime boundary-making", Shabtai Rosenne, 15 Political Geography 319, 1996
- "Establishing the International Tribunal for the Law of the Sea", Shabtai Rosenne, 89 American Journal of International Law 806, 1995
- "The United Nations Convention on the Law of the Sea", Shabtai Rosenne, 29 Israel Law Review 491, 1995
- "The Qatar/Bahrain Case What is a Treaty? A Framework Agreement and the Seising of the Court", Shabtai Rosenne, 8 Leiden Journal of International Law 161, 1995

== See also ==
- List of Israel Prize recipients
