= David Trimble =

Northern Irish statesman (1944–2022)

The Right Honourable The Lord Trimble PC
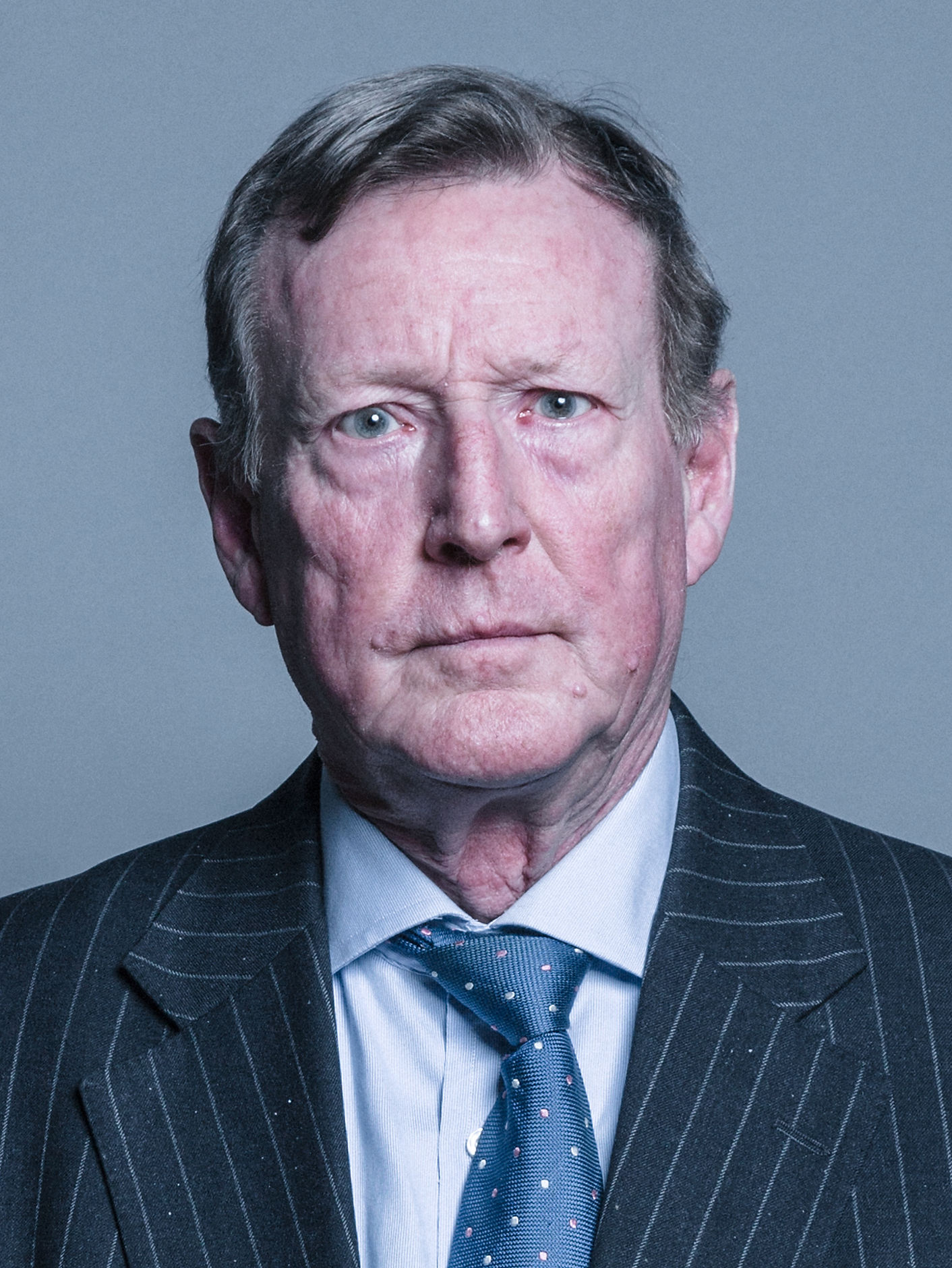
- Official portrait, 2018

First Minister of Northern Ireland
- In office 1 July 1998 – 14 October 2002 (Note: Reg Empey served as Acting First Minister from 1 July to 6 November 2001.) Serving with Seamus Mallon and Mark Durkan
- Preceded by: Office established
- Succeeded by: John Reid (Note: During the periods of suspension of the Northern Ireland Executive, the Secretaries of State for Northern Ireland assumed the responsibilities of the First Minister and deputy First Minister. At the time of suspension the Northern Ireland Secretary was John Reid.)(as Secretary of State for Northern Ireland); Ian Paisley (2007)

12th Leader of the Ulster Unionist Party
- In office 8 September 1995 – 24 July 2005
- Deputy: John Taylor; Reg Empey
- Preceded by: James Molyneaux
- Succeeded by: Reg Empey

Member of the Legislative Assembly for Upper Bann
- In office 25 June 1998 – 7 March 2007
- Preceded by: Constituency established
- Succeeded by: George Savage

Member of the House of Lords
- Lord Temporal
- Life peerage 2 June 2006 – 25 July 2022

Member of Parliament for Upper Bann
- In office 17 May 1990 – 11 April 2005
- Preceded by: Harold McCusker
- Succeeded by: David Simpson

Northern Ireland Forum Member for Upper Bann
- In office 30 May 1996 – 25 April 1998
- Preceded by: Forum created
- Succeeded by: Forum dissolved

Personal details
- Born: William David Trimble; 15 October 1944 Belfast, Northern Ireland
- Died: 25 July 2022 (aged 77) Dundonald, County Down, Northern Ireland
- Party: Ulster Unionist ( before 1973; 1978–2007 ); Ulster Vanguard (1973–1978); Conservative (from 2007)
- Spouses: Heather McComb (m. 1968; div. 1976) Daphne Orr (m. 1978)
- Children: Four
- Education: Queen's University Belfast (LLB)
- Profession: Barrister; lecturer
- Awards: Nobel Peace Prize (1998)
- Website: Official website
- Trimble's voice from the BBC programme Great Lives, 14 August 2007

William David Trimble, Baron Trimble (15 October 1944 – 25 July 2022) was a Northern Irish statesman and politician who was the inaugural First Minister of Northern Ireland from 1998 to 2002 and leader of the Ulster Unionist Party (UUP) from 1995 to 2005. He was also Member of Parliament (MP) for Upper Bann from 1990 to 2005 and Member of the Legislative Assembly (MLA) for Upper Bann from 1998 to 2007.

Trimble began his career teaching law at The Queen's University of Belfast in the 1970s, during which time he began to get involved with the paramilitary-linked Vanguard Progressive Unionist Party (VPUP). He was elected to the Northern Ireland Constitutional Convention in 1975 and joined the UUP in 1978 after the VPUP disbanded. Remaining at Queen's University, he continued his academic career until being elected as the MP for Upper Bann in 1990. In 1995 he was unexpectedly elected as the leader of the UUP. He was instrumental in the negotiations that led to the Good Friday Agreement in 1998 and (along with John Hume) won the Nobel Peace Prize that year for his efforts. He was later elected to become the first First Minister of Northern Ireland, although his tenure was turbulent and frequently interrupted by disagreements over the timetable for Provisional Irish Republican Army decommissioning.

Trimble resigned the leadership of the UUP soon after being defeated at the 2005 general election. In June 2006, he accepted a life peerage in the House of Lords, taking the title of Baron Trimble, of Lisnagarvey in the County of Antrim. He did not stand again for the Assembly, which finally reconvened in 2007, instead leaving the UUP to join the Conservative Party.

== Early life and education ==
William David Trimble was born in the Wellington Park Nursing Home, Belfast on 15 October 1944. He was the son of William and Ivy Trimble, lower-middle class Presbyterians who lived in Bangor, County Down.

He attended Bangor Grammar School from 1956 to 1963. He then studied at Queen's University of Belfast (QUB) from 1964 to 1968, where he was awarded the McKane Medal for Jurisprudence. He received a first class honours degree (the first at Queen's in three years), becoming a Bachelor of Laws (LL.B).

Trimble's paternal grandfather George was born in Easkey, County Sligo, to parents William Trimble and Mary Burns.

== Early career ==
=== Academic career ===
Trimble qualified as a barrister in 1969. He began that year as a Queen's University of Belfast lecturer, subsequently becoming Assistant Dean of the law faculty from 1973 to 1975, a senior lecturer in 1977 and head of Commercial and Property Law from 1981 to 1989. He resigned from the university in 1990 when he was elected to Parliament.

In 1983, as he sat in his office at the university, he heard gunshots which turned out to be those of the IRA killers of Edgar Graham, a friend and fellow law lecturer. He was asked to identify the body. In 1994 he was told by the Royal Ulster Constabulary that he had been targeted for assassination.

=== Political career ===
Trimble became involved with the right-wing, paramilitary-linked Vanguard Unionist Progressive Party (known as Vanguard) in the early 1970s. He ran unsuccessfully for the party in the 1973 Assembly election for North Down, coming last. In 1974, he was a legal adviser to the Ulster Workers' Council during the successful UWC strike against the Sunningdale Agreement.

Trimble was elected to the Northern Ireland Constitutional Convention in 1975 as a Vanguard member for Belfast South and, for a time, served as the party's joint deputy leader, along with the Ulster Defence Association's Glenn Barr. The party had been established by Bill Craig to oppose sharing power with Irish Nationalists and to prevent closer ties with the Republic of Ireland; however, Trimble was one of those to back Craig when the party split over Craig's proposal to allow voluntary power sharing with the SDLP.

Trimble joined the mainstream Ulster Unionist Party (UUP) in 1978 after Vanguard disbanded and was elected one of the four party secretaries. He served as vice chairman of the Lagan Valley Unionist Association from 1983 to 1985 and was named chairman in 1985. He served as chairman of the UUP Legal Committee from 1989 to 1995 and as honorary secretary of the Ulster Unionist Council in 1990–96.

Trimble was elected to Parliament with 58% of the vote in a by-election in Upper Bann in 1990. He was one of the few British politicians who urged support for the government of Bosnia and Herzegovina during the civil war in the 1990s.

== Leader of the Ulster Unionist Party ==
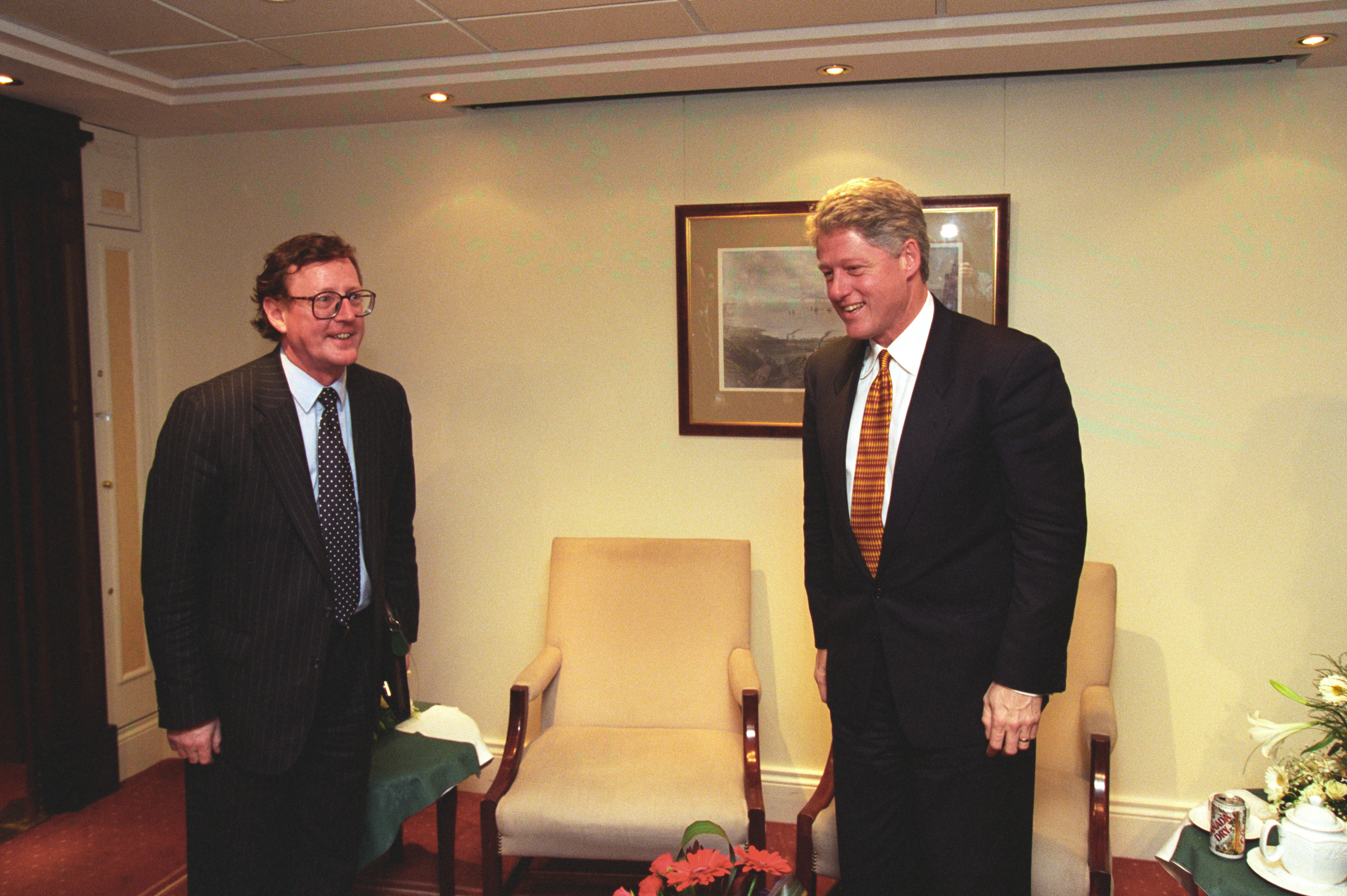
Trimble with US president Bill Clinton in Belfast, 1995

On 8 September 1995, Trimble unexpectedly won election as leader of the UUP, defeating the front-runner John Taylor and three other candidates.

Trimble's election as Leader came in the aftermath of his role in the Drumcree conflict, in which he led a controversial 1995 Orange Order Protestant march, amidst Nationalist protest, down the predominantly Catholic nationalist Garvaghy Road in Portadown, County Armagh. Trimble and Democratic Unionist Party (DUP) leader Ian Paisley walked hand-in-hand as the march, banned since 1997, proceeded down the road. Many Irish Catholics viewed it as insensitive, while many Protestants felt that it was a sign that Trimble was defending them.

Shortly after the election, Trimble became the first UUP Leader in 30 years (since Terence O'Neill) to meet with the Taoiseach in Dublin. In 1997, he became the first unionist leader since the partition of Ireland in 1921 to agree to negotiate with Sinn Féin.

In the subsequent All-Party negotiations, Trimble led the UUP delegation and sat at the table with Sinn Féin, though in the eight months of the negotiations he never spoke directly to their leader, Gerry Adams. Trimble at first opposed the appointment of former US Senator George Mitchell as the chairman of the all-party talks, but eventually accepted him. The talks were successful, culminating in the Good Friday Agreement of 10 April 1998, which resulted in power-sharing with Nationalists. Trimble was subsequently seen as instrumental in getting his party to accept the accord. On 22 May 1998, voters in Northern Ireland approved the agreement, with 71 per cent in favour.

Trimble was appointed to the Privy Council in the 1998 New Year Honours.

== First Minister of Northern Ireland ==
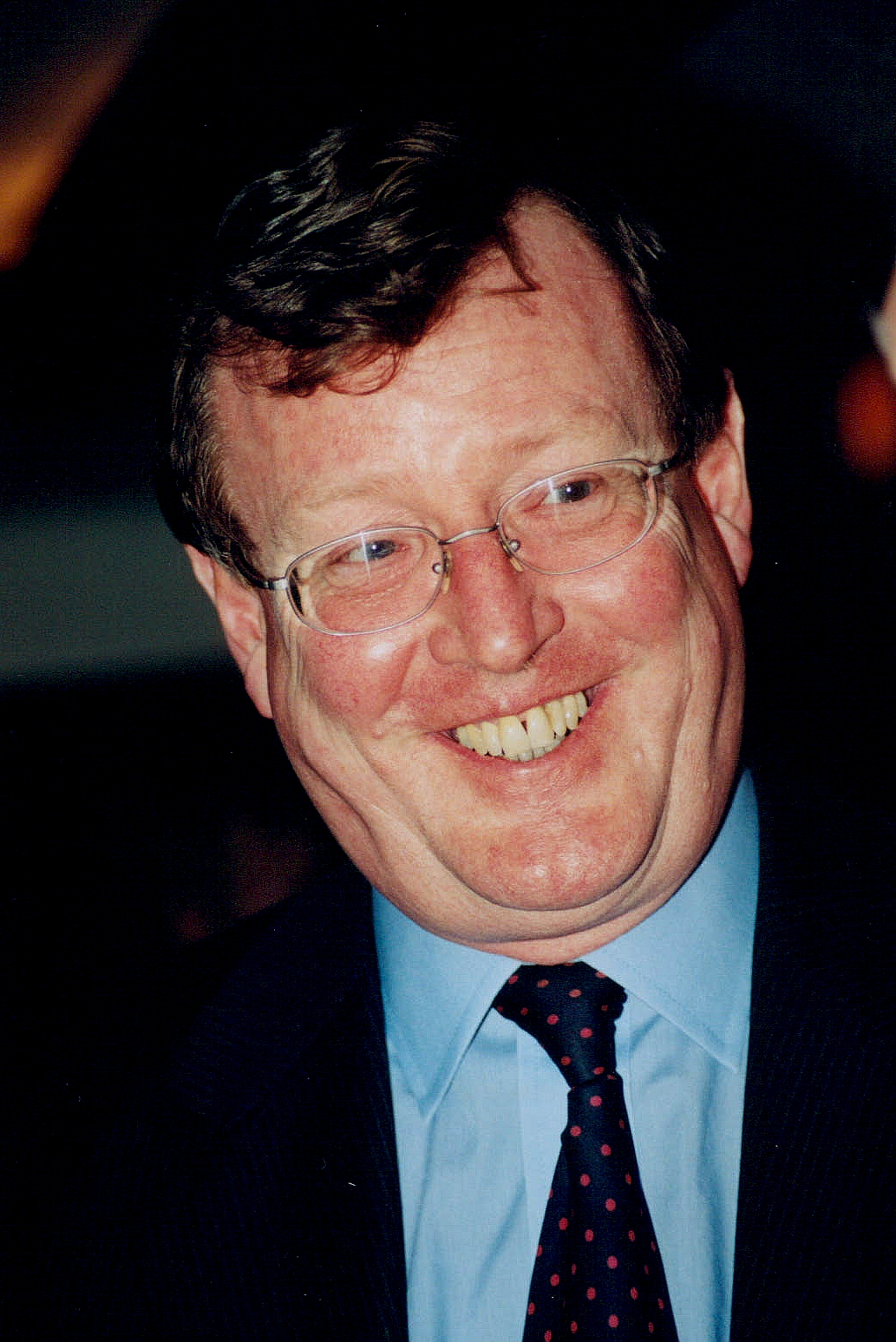
Trimble in Washington, D.C., 2001

Trimble was elected on 25 June 1998 as a Member of the Northern Ireland Assembly for Upper Bann. He was elected First Minister of Northern Ireland on 1 July 1998.

Arguments over the extent of Provisional Irish Republican Army decommissioning led to repeated disruptions during Trimble's tenure as First Minister. In particular:

- The office of First Minister was suspended from 11 February 2000 to 30 May 2000. During this time, Trimble attempted to reassure party members who were sceptical of the post-Good Friday Agreement institutions, saying, "Unionists won the war... The Agreement gave unionism the opportunity to take control of Northern Ireland's constitutional future and to take a major stake in the government of our country... Does anyone really think Gerry Adams wanted this?".
- Trimble resigned as First Minister on 1 July 2001 due to the continuing impasse arising from the IRA's refusal of his demands that it decommission its arms, as per the commitments all parties had signed up to in section 7 pt. 3 (page 25) of the 1998 Good Friday Agreement but he was re-elected on 5 November 2001
- The Assembly was suspended from 14 October 2002 until 2007 due to accusations of an IRA spy ring being operated there (the so-called Stormontgate Affair), which Trimble described as ten times worse than Watergate.

In 1998, Tony Blair announced a new judicial inquiry, the Bloody Sunday Inquiry, into the killing of 13 unarmed civil rights marchers in Derry in 1972. A previous investigation, the Widgery Tribunal, into the same event had been discredited. During the debate in the House of Commons, Trimble was one of few dissenting voices. He said: "I am sorry to have to say to the Prime Minister that I think that the hope expressed by the Honourable Member for Foyle [John Hume] that this will be part of the healing process is likely to be misplaced. Opening old wounds like this is likely to do more harm than good. The basic facts of the situation are known and not open to dispute." Reporting in 2010, the Saville Inquiry confirmed that all of the 13 killings and 13 woundings were unjustified.

During a meeting with Blair in 2001, Trimble questioned the impartiality of judge Sir Brian Kerr, later chief justice of Northern Ireland and a Law Lord appointed to the Supreme Court. This evidence and comments made about other public figures contradicts what Trimble's biographer considered a "lack of personal bigotry against Catholics".

== Peerage ==
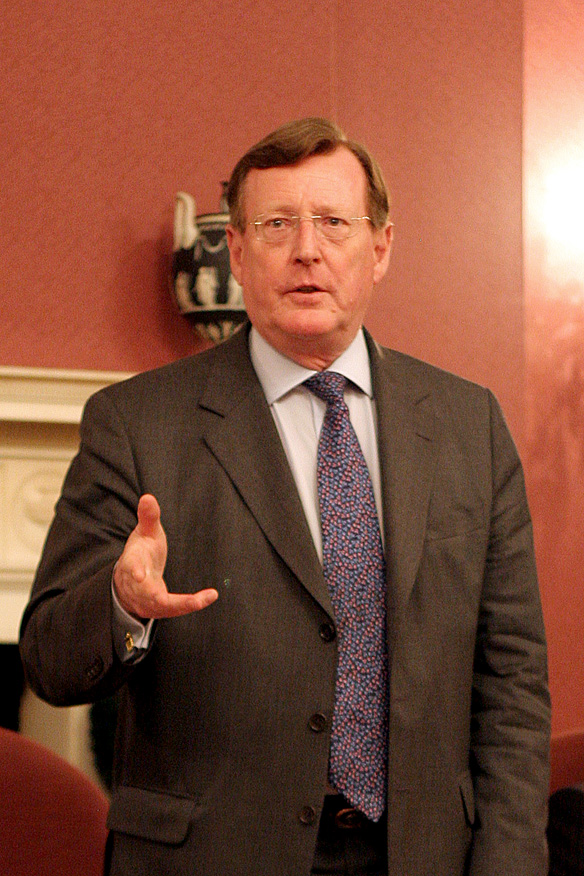
Trimble in 2009

At the general elections of 2005, Trimble was defeated in Upper Bann by the DUP's David Simpson in his bid for re-election to Parliament in Westminster. The Ulster Unionist Party retained only one seat in Parliament (out of 18 in Northern Ireland) after the 2005 general election, and Trimble resigned the party leadership on 7 May 2005.

On 11 April 2006, it was revealed that Trimble would take a seat in the House of Lords as a working life peer. On 21 May 2006 it was announced that he had chosen the geographical designation Lisnagarvey, the original name for his adopted home town of Lisburn. Subsequently, on 2 June 2006, he was created Baron Trimble, of Lisnagarvey in the County of Antrim. Eight months later, he confirmed that he would be standing down from the Northern Ireland Assembly at the next election.

Trimble announced on 17 April 2007 that he had decided to join the Conservative Party in order to have greater influence in politics in the United Kingdom. At the same time, however, he stated that he did not intend to campaign against the Ulster Unionist Party and proposed the idea of a future alliance between the Conservatives and the Ulster Unionists, similar to that which had existed prior to 1974 and the fallout of the Sunningdale Agreement. This idea became reality with the formation of the electoral alliance of Ulster Conservatives and Unionists in late 2008. It was reported that if the Conservatives won the 2010 general election, Trimble would receive a "significant" ministerial role, possibly in the Cabinet. In the end, however, Trimble was not offered any governmental or front bench position following the formation of the Conservative–Liberal Democrat coalition government.

In May 2010, Trimble joined the Friends of Israel Initiative, a non-Jewish international project supporting Israel's right to exist. The initiative, started by former prime minister of Spain José María Aznar, also included former United States Ambassador to the United Nations John R. Bolton, British historian Andrew Roberts and former Peruvian president Alejandro Toledo. On 29 January 2013, Trimble and Aznar co-wrote an article in The Times condemning Hezbollah and calling on European governments to list it as a terrorist organisation.

In 2016, Trimble supported the Leave side in the UK referendum on EU membership. He said that if he had ever had any doubts about the issue, "his eight years on the EU Select Committees in the House of Lords – which scrutinise the EU's operations – had convinced him of the need to cut ties with Brussels". He cited a study which found that economic growth in the UK reduced after the decision to enter the Common Market and reduced further when the UK went into the Single Market.

=== Turkel Commission of Inquiry ===
Routes of Gaza-bound flotilla (green) and Israeli Navy (orange)

On 14 June 2010, Trimble was appointed an observer to the Israeli special independent public Turkel Commission of Inquiry into the Gaza flotilla raid.

The Commission investigated whether Israel's actions in preventing the arrival of ships in Gaza were in accordance with international law. It focused among other things on the security considerations for imposing a naval blockade on the Gaza Strip and the conformity of the naval blockade with the rules of international law; the conformity of the actions during the raid to principles of international law; and the actions taken by those who organised and participated in the flotilla, and their identities.

On the commission were former Israeli Supreme Court Justice, Jacob Turkel, and former Technion University President, Amos Horev, as well two other members added in July 2010. (Bar Ilan University Professor of International Law Shabtai Rosenne also served on the commission from its establishment until his death on 21 September 2010.) In addition, the commission had two foreign observers, Trimble and former head of the Canadian military's judiciary, Judge Advocate General, Ken Watkin, who took part in hearings and discussions, but did not vote on the final conclusions. The panel, in January 2011, concluded both Israel's naval blockade of Gaza and the interception of the flotilla "were found to be legally pursuant to the rules of international law".

== Personal life ==
Trimble married firstly Heather McComb, a work colleague in the Land Registry, on 6 September 1968 at Donaghadee Church of Ireland church. Their twin sons were born prematurely and did not survive. In 1976 the couple divorced. Two years later, on 31 August 1978, he married a former student of his, Daphne Elizabeth (née Orr) in Warrenpoint Methodist Church. They had two sons and two daughters (Richard, Victoria, Nicholas and Sarah). Richard Trimble is a maths teacher and head of the sixth form at Graveney School in Tooting, South West London. Lady Trimble served as a member of the Equality Commission for Northern Ireland and later the Northern Ireland Human Rights Commission, before standing unsuccessfully in the UK parliamentary election of May 2010 for the Conservatives and Unionists in Lagan Valley.

His son Nicholas was active within the Ulster Unionist Party and serving on the Lisburn and Castlereagh City Council at the time of his father's death. Nicholas Trimble was co-opted in 2016 to replace Alexander Redpath as a Councillor representing Downshire West on Lisburn and Castlereagh City Council.

Trimble admitted in July 2019 that he was "forced" to change his position on same-sex marriage and partnerships after voting against them, because of his lesbian daughter Vicky, who married her girlfriend Rosalind Stephens in Scotland in 2017. He told peers in the House of Lords "I cannot change that, and I cannot now go around saying that I am opposed to it because I acquiesced to it. There we are."

In 2021 Trimble was diagnosed with mixed dementia, a combination of Alzheimer's disease and vascular dementia, and in early 2022 with lung cancer. He died of community-acquired pneumonia in the Ulster Hospital, Dundonald, on 25 July 2022, at the age of 77.

== Honours ==
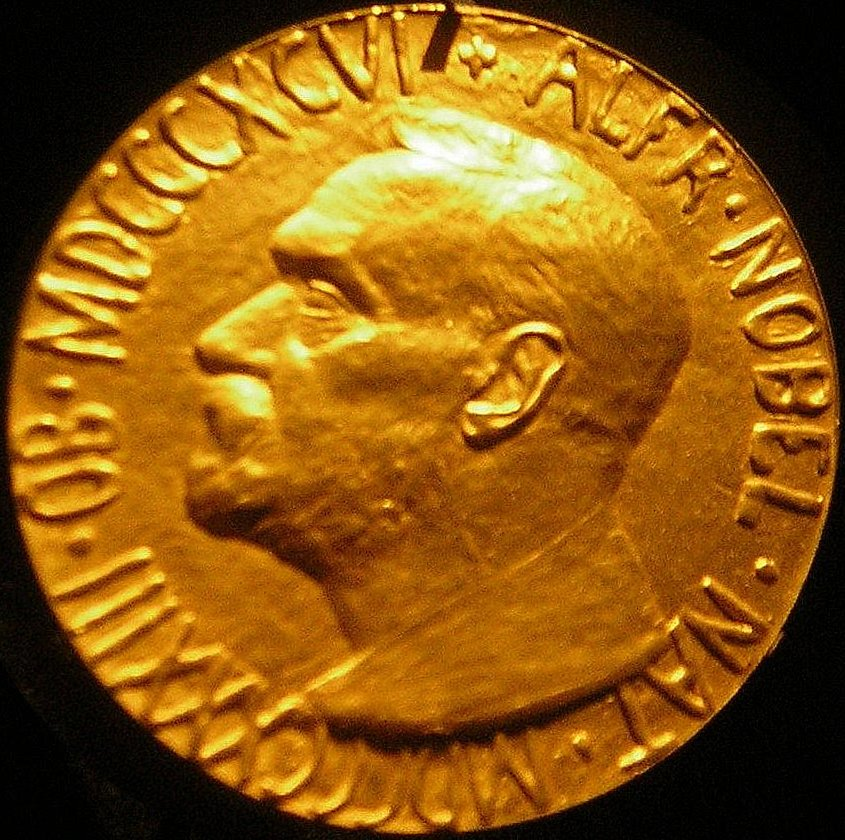
Nobel Peace Prize

In October 1998, Trimble and John Hume were awarded the Nobel Peace Prize for their efforts to find a peaceful solution to the conflict in Northern Ireland. The Nobel Institute noted:

As the leader of the traditionally predominant party in Northern Ireland, David Trimble showed great political courage when, at a critical stage of the process, he advocated solutions which led to the [Belfast (Good Friday)] peace agreement.

At a ceremony in Paris on 8 December 1999, Trimble was appointed an Officier in the Légion d'Honneur by the French Government.

In 2002, Trimble was awarded the Golden Plate Award of the American Academy of Achievement.

== Selected works ==
=== Books ===
- Trimble, David (2001). To Raise Up a New Northern Ireland: Articles and Speeches 1998–2000. The Belfast Press. ISBN 978-0953928712. Archived from the original on 25 July 2011.
- Trimble, W D (1991). The foundation of Northern Ireland. Lurgan, County Armagh: Ulster Society Publications. p. 43. ISBN 9781872076102. OCLC 26273413.

=== Articles ===
- Trimble, David (1998–1999). "The Belfast Agreement". Fordham International Law Journal. 22: 1145.

== See also ==
- List of Northern Ireland Members of the House of Lords
- List of Northern Ireland members of the Privy Council of the United Kingdom

== Notes and references ==
Parliament of the United Kingdom
Preceded by Harold McCusker	Member of Parliament for Upper Bann; 1990–2005	Succeeded by David Simpson
Northern Ireland Assembly
New assembly	Member of the Legislative Assembly for Upper Bann; 1998–2007	Succeeded by George Savage
Political offices
New office	First Minister of Northern Ireland; 1998–2002	Vacant Office suspended Title next held by Ian Paisley
Party political offices
Preceded by Ernest Baird; Lindsay Smyth	Deputy Leader of the Vanguard Unionist Progressive Party; 1975–1978; Served alongside: Glenn Barr	Position abolished
Preceded by James Molyneaux	Leader of the Ulster Unionist Party; 1995–2005	Succeeded by Reg Empey
