= Ken Watkin =

Canadian general and lawyer

Brigadier General Ken Watkin OMM, CD, KC
- Born: Kenneth Watkin; November 3, 1954 (age 72); Kingston, Ontario, Canada
- Education: Royal Military College of Canada (Bachelor of Laws; 1976), Queen's University (Master of Laws), and; Harvard Law School (Visiting Fellow at the Human Rights Program)
- Known for: Former Judge Advocate General of the Canadian Forces
- Notable work: "Assessing Proportionality: Moral Complexity and Legal Rules", 8 Yearbook of International Humanitarian Law 3, 2007; Warriors without rights?: combatants, unprivileged belligerents, and the struggle over legitimacy, 2005
- Predecessor: Maj.-Gen. Jerry Pitzul
- Successor: Brig.-Gen. B. Blaise Cathcart
- Spouse: Maureen
- Children: three daughters

Brigadier General Kenneth Watkin, OMM CD KC (born 1954) is a Canadian lawyer, soldier and jurist. Watkin was Judge Advocate General (JAG) of the Canadian Forces from 2006 to 2010. He is an expert on military law.

He was promoted to brigadier general and appointed JAG effective April 2006, for a four-year term.

In June 2010, the Israeli government appointed Watkin to be one of two international observers serving on an Israeli commission of inquiry looking into the events surrounding an Israeli raid on the Mavi Marmara.

== Early life and education ==
Watkin was born in Kingston, Ontario, a non-identical triplet, along with a brother (Kerry) and sister (Kathy); he also has an older brother (Robert). He and his siblings attended Loyalist Collegiate.

Watkin is a graduate of the Royal Military College of Canada (B.A., 1976) and Queen's University Law School in Kingston, Ontario, where he received Bachelor of Laws and Master of Laws degrees. From 2002 to 2003, Watkin was a visiting fellow at the Human Rights Program of Harvard Law School.

== Career ==
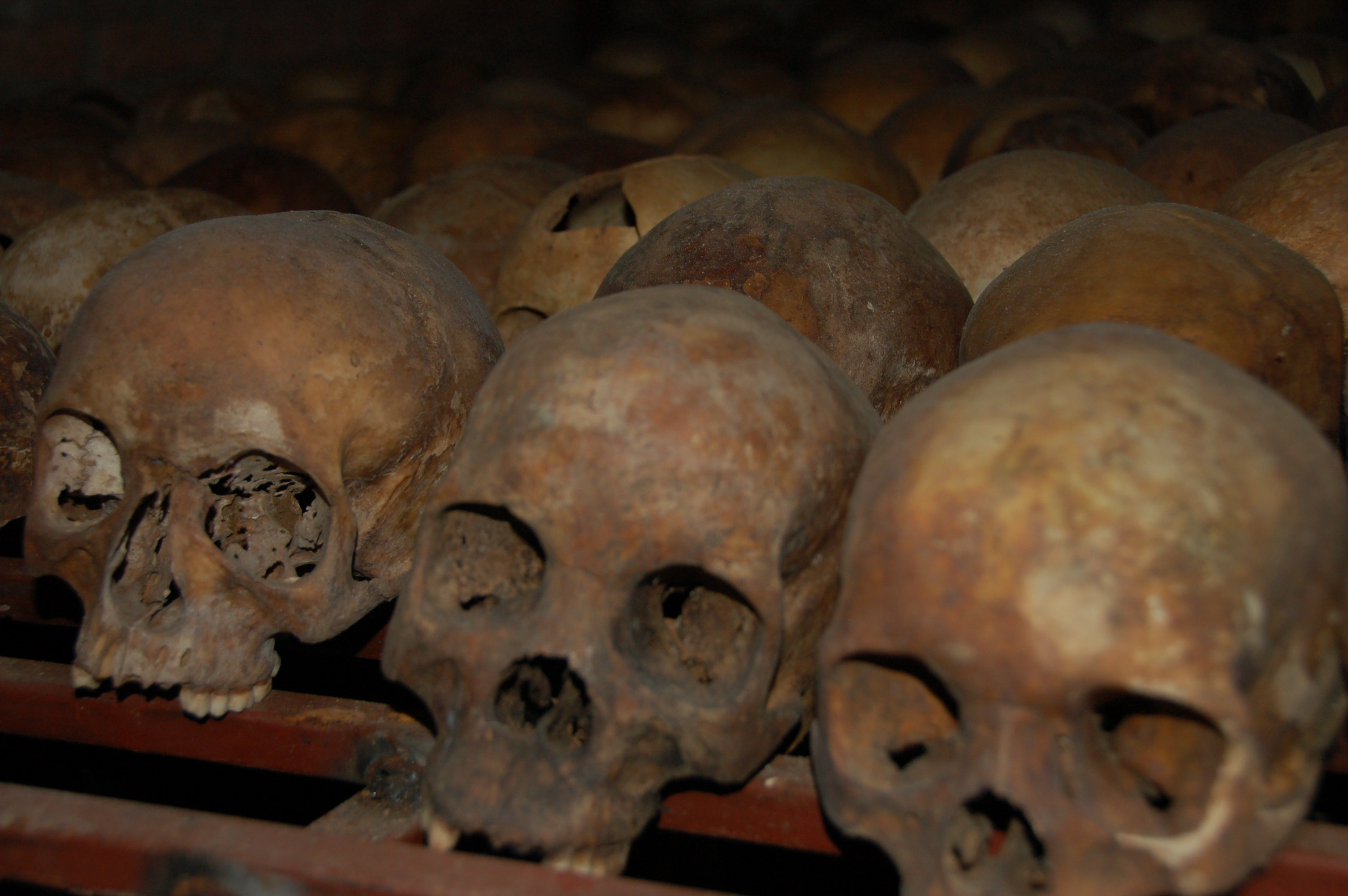
Skulls of victims of Rwandan genocide

=== Pre-JAG ===
Ken Watkin started his career as an infantry officer in the Royal Canadian Regiment. His first tour of duty after graduating from The Royal Military College was with the Royal Canadian Regiment battalion in Gagetown New Brunswick.

Watkin served as a Canadian Forces legal officer, starting in 1982, for 24 years prior to his appointment to JAG. He was trial counsel at courts-martial and appellate counsel before the Canadian Court Martial Appeal Court. He worked as legal counsel on several investigations into the 1994 Rwandan genocide, and counselled Canadian naval commanders in Bosnia and during a fisheries dispute with Spain. He has written papers on the topics of human rights, international humanitarian law, and military operational law.

==== Somalia shooting inquiry ====
In the summer of 1994 when he was a Lieutenant-Colonel he wrote a legal review in which he questioned the conclusions of an investigation by Canadian Airborne Regiment Battle Group Col. Serge Labbe of an incident later known as the Somalia Affair, where two Somalis were shot while fleeing from the Canadian compound in Belet Huen on March 4, 1993. One of the men died. He also questioned Labbe's "openness in reporting to higher headquarters." Watkin's paper, which concluded that the Canadian military had attempted a cover-up, was considered during the inquiry into the events of that day. Watkin testified that he was disturbed by comments made by Lt.-Col. Carol Mathieu, who was charged with negligent performance of duty for allegedly ordering soldiers to fire on looters. Watkin had been asked to brief the soldiers on the rules of war. He testified that Mathieu said, "All that doesn't matter, you just throw down some loose rounds".

==== Afghan detainee issue ====
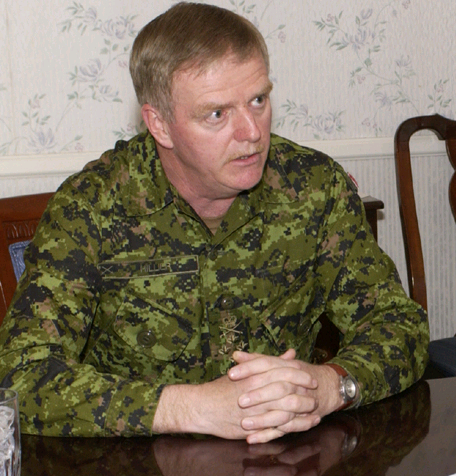
General Rick Hillier

In the Canadian Afghan detainee issue, Watkin as Judge Advocate General wrote a May 2007 memo to Chief of Defence Staff Gen. Rick Hillier and Lt.-Gen. Michel Gauthier telling them that it would be a crime to fail to investigate allegations of prisoner abuse. He advised the Canadian Forces command that they could be "criminally negligent" if they were to transfer detainees to a risk of torture in Afghan hands. Watkin declined to answer questions on the basis of solicitor-client privilege when called to testify in Canada's House of Commons, saying that the privilege owed to the Government of Canada prevented him answering a number of the House's questions. Craig Scott, an Osgoode Hall Law School professor of international human rights law, said: "If there's this paper trail of good legal advice going against what the government is doing, it's even more likely (the federal government violated its obligations under international law)."

=== Turkel Commission of Inquiry ===
Routes of Gaza-bound flotilla (green) and Israeli Navy (orange)

On June 14, 2010, he was appointed as an observer to the Israeli special independent public Turkel Commission of Inquiry into the Gaza flotilla raid.

The Commission investigated whether Israel's actions in preventing the arrival of ships in Gaza were in accordance with international law. Its focus was, among other things, on the security considerations for imposing a naval blockade on the Gaza Strip and the conformity of the naval blockade with the rules of international law; the conformity of the actions during the raid to principles of international law; and the actions taken by those who organized and participated in the flotilla, and their identities.

On the Commission were former Israeli Supreme Court Justice, Jacob Turkel, and former Technion University President, Amos Horev, as well as two other members added in July 2010. (Shabtai Rosenne, Bar Ilan University Professor of International Law, also served on the Commission from its establishment until his death on 21 September 2010.) In addition, the Commission had two foreign observers, Watkin and former First Minister of Northern Ireland, David Trimble, who took part in hearings and discussions, but did not vote on the final conclusions.

== Awards ==
- Appointed to the Order of Military Merit (2002)
- Appointed Queen's Counsel (Q.C.) (2006)
- Maritime Commander's Commendation
- 2017 Francis Lieber Prize, American Society of International Law, Best Book on Law and Armed Conflict, Fighting at the Legal Boundaries: The Use of Force in Contemporary Conflict
- 2008 Lieber Society Military Prize, American Society of International Law, for the article "Assessing Proportionality: Moral Complexity and Legal Rules"

== Select works ==
=== Books ===
- The Law in War: A Concise Overview, Routledge, 2018, ISBN 9781138910478
- Fighting at the Legal Boundaries: Controlling the Use of Force in Contemporary Conflict, Oxford University Press, 2016, ISBN 9780190457976
- "Stability Operations: A Guiding Framework for 'Small Wars' and other Conflicts of the 21st Century?", Chapter in The war in Afghanistan: a legal analysis, Michael N. Schmitt, Government Printing Office, 2009, ISBN 1-884733-64-6
- "21st Century Conflict and International Humanitarian Law: Status Quo or Change?", Chapter in International law and armed conflict: exploring the faultlines, Michael N. Schmitt, Jelena Pejic, Yôrām Dinšṭein, Martinus Nijhoff Publishers, 2007, ISBN 90-04-15428-0
- Warriors without rights?: combatants, unprivileged belligerents, and the struggle over legitimacy, Kenneth Watkin, Harvard School of Public Health, Program on Humanitarian Policy and Conflict Research, 2005

=== Articles ===
- "Opportunity Lost: Organized Armed Groups and the ICRC 'Direct Participation in Hostilities' Interpretive Guidance", Kenneth Watkin, 42 NYU Journal of International Law and Politics 641, 2010
- "Assessing Proportionality: Moral Complexity and Legal Rules", 8 Yearbook of International Humanitarian Law 3, 2007
- "Tergeting: Pragmatism and the Real World", Ken Watkin, 8.2 The Canadian Army Journal 66, Summer 2005
- "Canada/United States Military Interoperability and Humanitarian Law Issues: Land Mines, Terrorism, Military Objectives and Targeted Killing", Kenneth Watkin, 15 Duke Journal of Comparative & International Law 281, 2004–05
- "Controlling the Use of Force: A Role for Human Rights Norms in Contemporary Armed Conflict", Kenneth Watkin, The American Journal of International Law, 2004
- "Guerriers, obéissance et primauté du droit", Kenneth Watkin, 3 Le Bulletin de Doctrine et d'Instruction de l'Armee de Terre 24, Winter 2000/Spring 2001

Military offices
Preceded by Maj.-Gen. Jerry Pitzul	Judge Advocate General; 2006–10	Succeeded by Brig.-Gen. B. Blaise Cathcart
