= Bernatchez =

Bernatchez is a surname. Notable people with the surname include:

- Geneviève Bernatchez, Canadian Forces officer
- Louis Bernatchez (1960–2023), Canadian professor
- Nazaire Bernatchez (1838–1906), Canadian politician
- René Bernatchez (1913–1980), Canadian politician

== See also ==
- Bernache
