= Max Reis =

Max Reis may refer to:

- Max Reis (chemical engineer)
- Max Reis (racing driver)
