= Josef Singer =

Israeli aeronautic engineer

- יוסף זינגר
- Born: August 24, 1923; Vienna
- Died: November 12, 2009 (aged 86)
- Education: Imperial College London; the Polytechnic Institute of Brooklyn
- Known for: President of Technion – Israel Institute of Technology
- Awards: Wilhelm Exner Medal (1994); Ludwig Prandtl Ring (1994); Israel Prize (2000)

Josef ("Josi") Singer (Hebrew: יוסף זינגר; August 24, 1923 – November 12, 2009) was an Israeli aeronautical engineer. He was a professor at the Technion – Israel Institute of Technology and served as the university's president.

== Biography ==
Singer was born in Vienna. He and his family immigrated to Haifa, Mandatory Palestine, in 1933 when he was 10 years old. He studied at the Hebrew Reali School. In his youth he joined the Haganah and earned a pilot's license. During World War II he enlisted in the Royal Air Force and served for three years as a mechanic and cadet pilot.

He subsequently studied aeronautical engineering at Imperial College London, earning a first-class BSc and DIC in 1948. He then served as a technical officer in the Israeli Air Force. After being discharged with the rank of Major, he resumed his studies at the Polytechnic Institute of Brooklyn, earning an MSc in 1953 and a PhD in 1957 under the supervision of Nicholas J. Hoff.

Singer joined the faculty of the Technion. He founded the university's Department of Aeronautical Engineering and served as its dean twice, from 1958 to 1960 and again from 1965 to 1967. He became an associate professor in 1961 and a full professor in 1965. He was President of the Technion from 1982 to 1986. He replaced Amos Horev as president, and was in turn succeeded by Max Reis. He also became Senior Vice President of Israel Aircraft Industries, served as the manager of its engineering division from 1971 to 1973, and was chairman of its Board of Directors from 1986 to 1988.

He was a founding member and president of the Israel Society of Aeronautics and Astronautics. He was also a member of the International Academy of Astronautics, foreign associate of the National Academy of Engineering, foreign member of the French Air and Space Academy, and fellow of the American Institute of Aeronautics and Astronautics. He was awarded the International Council of the Aeronautical Sciences' Maurice Roy Medal in 1990, the Ludwig Prandtl Ring in 1994, and the Wilhelm Exner Medal in 1994. He was the recipient of the Israel Prize in 2000 for his lifetime achievement in the field of aeronautical engineering. He was awarded the Sesquicentennial Medal by the New York University Tandon School of Engineering (formerly the Polytechnic Institute of Brooklyn - his alma mater) in 2005, as well as honorary doctorates by Aix-Marseille University and the University of Glasgow.

== Awards ==
- Maurice Roy Medal (1990).
- Wilhelm Exner Medal (1994).
- Ludwig Prandtl Ring (1994).
- Israel Prize (2000).

== See also ==
- List of presidents of the Technion
