= Loyalist Collegiate and Vocational Institute =

Location
- 153 Van Order Drive; Kingston, Ontario, K7M 1B9; Canada; 44°14′18″N 76°31′13″W

Information
- School type: Public, Secondary
- Motto: Grit, Growth, Gratitude
- Founded: 1963 (official opening in 1964)
- School board: Limestone District School Board
- Superintendent: Krishna Burra, CEO/Director of Education, LDSB
- Area trustee: Joy Morning, City of Kingston: Portsmouth & Sydenham Districts
- Administrator: Laura Varrette
- Principal: Margaret Connelly
- Grades: 9 - 12
- Enrollment: 669 (2022-2023)
- Language: English
- Colours: Kelly green, gold and white
- Team name: Lancers
- Website: lcvi.limestone.on.ca

Loyalist Collegiate and Vocational Institute (LCVI) is a secondary school (high school) located in Kingston, Ontario, Canada. It is commonly referred to as simply "LC". The school is located at 153 Van Order Drive in the city's Calvin Park neighbourhood. It was built to serve newly developed areas in what was then the west end of the city, where thousands of new homes were being built in the early 1960s. Loyalist was the third public high school in the city and was needed to accommodate the first wave of the baby boom generation then entering their teen years. Construction began in 1962 and classes began in fall 1963. The official opening was held October 6, 1964.

LCVI hosted elementary school students when it first opened, since construction of Calvin Park Public School, located across the street from the high school, had not yet been completed. The elementary school portion of Loyalist was given the name "Loyalist Senior Public School" (LSPS).

The school was built to accommodate up to 2,000 students. When Loyalist first began operation, secondary enrollment was 715. At the beginning of its second year (1964), enrollment was 984. Enrollment at LSPS in 1963 was 270, and increased to 300 in 1964. Enrollment in 2010 was approximately 750, but had further reduced to just over 500 students by 2015. Peak enrollment (near capacity) occurred in the early 1970s, when the school was by far the largest in the area, and the major decline toward today's numbers started in the early 1980s as the last of the baby boom generation graduated. Following the closure of Queen Elizabeth Collegiate and Vocational Institute in 2016, students already attending QECVI were transferred to LCVI, and enrollment is now projected to be stable until about 2020.

Under principal John "Jack" Linscott from 1963 until 1984, LCVI was highly successful in combining technical and trades education with traditional academics. The school was also an early leader in implementing International and English as a Second Language programs.

As when it first opened, LCVI again shares space with grade 7 and 8 students who attend Calvin Park Public School. Calvin Park Public School was previously a kindergarten to grade 8 school which opened in 1965 in a separate building directly across the street from LCVI. The original building now serves as an adult education centre.

The school colours are Kelly green, white and gold, and sports teams use the name "Lancers".

== School characteristics ==
- Loyalist's community includes Kingston's central electoral areas including Portsmouth, Trillium and Meadowbrook-Strathcona Districts.
- Calvin Park Public School, Grade 7 and 8 is located in the same building.
- Enrollment of over 500 students in Grades 9 to 12 (2015)
- Adult and Senior Citizen's Programs
- Support services and individualized programs for students with special needs
- Community Service Work
- Cook's Internship (Focus Program) & Dual Credit Oversight for Cook's Apprenticeship Program
- Renovations Plus (Focus Program)
- Studio LC (Focus Program)
- Academic Arts Enriched Program (AAEP) Grades 9 & 10
- Advanced Placement-Prep Grades 9 & 10
- Advanced Placement courses & exams in grades 11 and 12
- LINK Program site
- English as a Second Language (International Program Site)
- SHSM – Construction, Arts, Health & Wellness, Hospitality & Tourism
- School to Community
- Canadian Academy of Travel and Tourism- Gold Level School (One of 4 provincial gold level programs)

== International education ==
LCVI hosts a number of programs tailored to meet the needs of a variety of international students. Students may complete their high school diploma requirements, prepare for post-secondary studies, or do intensive language study.

Program features include:

- language classes
- full curriculum
- academic and career counselling
- high school credits
- post-secondary preparation

== Notable alumni ==
- Syl Apps, Jr., retired NHL player
- Scott Arniel, former NHL player and head coach
- Thomas Cromwell, jurist and former Supreme Court of Canada justice.
- Doug Gilmour, retired NHL player
- Isra Girgrah, former World Professional Boxing Champion
- Lisa Howard, Canadian actor
- Ted Hsu, Canadian politician, MP for Kingston and the Islands (2011–15); MPP (2022-)
- Jennifer Lanthier, children's author
- Ted Simonett, Canadian actor
- Julie Stewart, Canadian actor
- Judith Thompson, playwright
- Ken Watkin, Judge Advocate General (JAG) of the Canadian Forces from 2006 to 2010
- Antje McNeely, former Chief of Kingston police

== See also ==
- Education in Ontario
- List of secondary schools in Ontario
