= Public Committee (Israel) =

A Public Committee (Hebrew: ועדה ציבורית) is a committee appointed by the Israeli Cabinet, or by other various governmental bodies in Israel, and at times with the cooperation of other Israeli public bodies, in order to objectively explore a matter on the public agenda.

Public Committees are appointed to review a public matter that requires legislation such as tax reform and formulate recommendations, to review the conduct of a public body, formulating recommendations to prevent a repetition of such misconducts, and draw conclusions on the figures responsible for it or to award a prize.

Committee are granted a letter of appointment by the responsible minister that details the committee's chair and members, its objectives and timetable.

Each committee receives a descriptive name that reflects its goal. They usually become known by the chair's name, such as the Shamgar Commission, and most recently, the Turkel Commission.

The committee issues a comprehensive report that summarizes its findings and recommendations. Deadlines are not always met, and at times the committee produces an interim report. Usually, reports are available for public review. At times, when national security is at stake, the report is divided into confidential and public sections. Committee recommendations may or may not be binding.

Four types of committees are appointed by law:

- National Commission of Inquiry – Established according to the National Commission of Inquiry 1968, or the State Comptroller's law 1958
- Parliamentary Commission of Inquiry – Established according to the Basic law: the Knesset
- Government Revision Committee – Established according to the Government law - 2001 (as the most recent Turkel Commission was established).
- IDF Inquiry Commission – Established according to the Military-Justice law 1955.

Most Public Committees are dismantled after completing their work. At times, a Public Committees are established for long-term objectives, or for regular activities, such as the Government official's senior positions Committee and the Government Appellation Committee (Hebrew: ועדת השמות, Va'adat HaShemot)

== See also ==
- Commission of inquiry
- Public inquiry
- Jacob Turkel
