= Merhav =

Merhav is a surname. Notable people with the surname include:

- Dina Merhav (1936–2022), Croatian-born Israeli sculptor
- Reuven Merhav (born 1936), Israeli diplomat
