= Turkel Commission =

Israeli investigation into military operation

The Turkel Commission (officially The Public Commission to Examine the Maritime Incident of 31 May 2010) was an inquiry set up by Israeli Government to investigate the 2010 Gaza flotilla raid, and the Blockade of Gaza. It was led by Israeli retired Supreme Court Judge Jacob Turkel. The other initial members of the commission were former president of the Technion and military expert, Amos Horev, and professor of international law, Shabtai Rosenne, who died in September 2010. The probe was overseen by two International observers: William David Trimble, former Leader of the Northern Irish Ulster Unionist Party and Northern Irish First Minister, a Nobel Peace Prize laureate, and Canadian former military judge Ken Watkin.

The report found that the blockade of Gaza was legal on the basis that human rights organizations have found that 60% of Gazans suffer from "'food insecurity' (i.e., the lack of physical and economic access to sustainable food sources), and not [from] 'starvation' (a deliberate deprivation of food, which is intended to weaken or annihilate the population)."

The report has been criticized for being inconsistent with human rights reports and for inadequate treatment of the principle of proportionality regarding the blockade of Gaza. Specifically, the report denies the existence of a humanitarian crisis in Gaza. The report has also been criticized for failing to reconcile its conclusions with the findings by Israeli doctors that all of the dead passengers suffered multiple bullet wounds and five were shot in the neck or head.

The first part of the report was published in January 2011, the second part, titled "Israel’s Mechanisms for Examining and Investigating Complaints and Claims of Violations of the Laws of Armed Conflict According to International Law" was published in 2013.

== Background ==
In the aftermath of the Gaza flotilla raid, Israel rejected calls from the United Nations and governments all around the world for an independent investigation of the events, (Note: Schult, Christoph; Steinvorth, Daniel (June 16, 2010). "Chip im Slip". Der Spiegel. "Regierungen in aller Welt forderten Israel auf, den Vorfall durch internationale Ermittler klären zu lassen, doch Premier Benjamin Netanjahu wollte davon nichts wissen – und hat nun eine interne Kommission eingesetzt." (Governments all over the world have urged Israel to have international investigators examine the incident, but Prime Minister Benjamin Netanyahu did not want to hear about this – and has installed an internal commission.)) but has formed a domestic commission of inquiry to investigate the raid, that includes two international observers and is headed by retired Supreme Court of Israel Justice Jacob Turkel.

== Members ==
The Israeli members of the commission were as follows:

- Chair: Justice (ret.) Jacob Turkel – former Israeli Supreme Court Justice
- Professor Shabtai Rosenne – Bar Ilan University Professor of International Law (Professor Rosenne, 93 years old, died during the work of the commission, on 21 September 2010, and was not replaced.)
- Maj.-Gen (Res.) Amos Horev – retired Israeli army major-general and Technion President
- Professor Miguel Deutch – Tel Aviv University Professor of Law
- Reuven Merhav – retired Foreign Ministry director-general

The two international observers were:

- David Trimble (UK) – Former Leader of the Northern Irish Ulster Unionist Party and former First Minister of Northern Ireland
- Ken Watkin Q.C. (Canada) – former head of the Canadian military's legal branch, Judge Advocate General

The committee was coordinated and managed by Hoshea Gottlieb.

The committee also contracted the services of two foreign international law experts:

- Professor Wolff Heintschel von Heinegg
- Professor Michael Schmitt

== Authority and operation ==
The inquiry was charged with investigating the legality of the Israeli blockade and the legality of the Israeli navy's actions during the raid, and determining whether investigations of claims of war crimes and breaches of international law conform to Western standards. It was also charged with looking into the Turkish position, and the actions taken by the flotilla's organizers, especially the IHH, and examining the identities and intentions of the flotilla's participants.

The commission was approved by the Cabinet of Israel on 14 June. The commission could hold sessions behind closed doors if it so decided. The inquiry was to exclusively examine the legality of Israel's naval blockade of Gaza and the flotilla raid.

Amid widespread media criticism that painted the commission as a tool to justify the blockade of Gaza, the use of force to maintain it and the Gaza flotilla raid, Jacob Turkel told the Israeli government that the commission could not do its job without expanded investigative powers. Other jurists criticized the panel's limited mandate, and the Israeli peace group Gush Shalom sent a petition to Israel's High Court of Justice. As of June 2010, the committee had no power to subpoena witnesses and cannot draw personal conclusions against those involved in the raid. Prime Minister Benjamin Netanyahu, Justice Minister Yaakov Neeman, Defense Minister Ehud Barak and Turkel engaged in intense negotiations on the mandate and powers of the commission. Barak refuses to let the panel question any Israel Defense Forces soldiers or officers aside from its chief of staff and its military advocate general.

== International observers ==
The two international observers were David Trimble of the United Kingdom and Brig.-Gen. (Ret.) Ken Watkin, Q.C. of Canada. The foreign observers took part in hearings and discussions, but did not vote on the proceedings or the final conclusions. Turkel informed the two foreign observers that they would be allowed to question witnesses freely during the hearings and examine any material they wished, but that they might be denied access to documents or information if it was "almost certain to cause substantial harm to national security or to the state's foreign relations." According to the BBC and Der Spiegel, both observers are seen as friends of Israel.

In an official letter to the commission after the release of the first part of their findings in January 2011, Trimble and Watkin stated that they had "no doubt that the Commission is independent." Both expressed their satisfaction with the work of the commission, stating that it had provided them with access to all materials and made sure they were full partners in the process and that "We are glad the commission made ongoing efforts to hear both sides."

== Findings ==
The first part of the findings were released January 23, 2011. In the 245-page report, the commission "cleared the government and military of wrongdoing" saying that the "passengers were to blame for the violence." It continued and said "by clearly resisting capture, the Mavi Marmara had become a military objective." "The commission accused the IHH, a Turkish Islamist charity that owned the Mavi Marmara, "of planned and extremely violent" resistance which was "directly connected to the ongoing international armed conflict between Israel and Hamas."

The January 2011 report addressed the following:

- The question of whether or not the naval blockade imposed on the Gaza Strip by Israel conformed with the rules of international law.
- An assessment of the actions taken by the IDF to enforce the naval blockade.
- An examination of the actions taken by the organizers of the flotilla and its participants and their identity.

The commission members divided the report into two sections, the first dealing with the naval blockade of the Gaza Strip and the second with the operation to capture the Mavi Marmara.

=== Legality of the naval blockade ===
Regarding whether or not the naval blockade imposed on the Gaza Strip by Israel conformed to the rules of international law, the commission found that the conflict between Israel and the Gaza Strip is an international armed conflict and that Israel's “effective control” of the Gaza Strip ended when it completed the disengagement from the territory. The purpose of the naval blockade was primarily a military- security one. The naval blockade was imposed on the Gaza Strip lawfully, with Israel complying with the conditions for imposing it.

The commission also stated that Israel is complying with its humanitarian obligations as the blockading party, including the prohibition against starving the civilian population or preventing the supply of objects essential for the survival of the civilian population and medical supplies, and the requirement that the damage to the civilian population is not excessive in relation to the real and direct military advantage anticipated from the blockade. The imposition and enforcement of the naval blockade on the Gaza Strip was not found to constitute "collective punishment" of the population of the Gaza Strip.

The commission further found that international law does not give individuals or groups the freedom to ignore the imposition of a naval blockade that satisfies the conditions for imposing it and that is enforced accordingly, especially where a blockade satisfies obligations to neutral parties, merely because in the opinion of those individuals or groups it violates the duties of the party imposing the blockade concerning the entity subject to the blockade.

=== Legality of the raid ===
Regarding the legality of the raid itself, the commission reached the following conclusion: A vessel that attempts to breach a blockade is subject to international law governing the conduct of hostilities, and international humanitarian law, including the rules governing the use of force. The Israeli armed forces' interception and capture of the Gaza flotilla vessels was consistent with established international naval practice.

=== Use of force ===
Regarding the use of force, the commission concluded the following:

- The participants in the flotilla were predominantly an international group of civilians whose main goal was to bring publicity to the humanitarian situation in Gaza by attempting to breach the blockade.
- A group of IHH and affiliated activists on board the Mavi Marmara and the other flotilla vessels violently opposed the Israeli boarding. The IHH activists who participated in that violence were civilians taking a direct part in hostilities.
- The force used against civilians on board the flotilla was governed by the principles of "necessity" and use of "proportionate force" associated with human rights-based law enforcement norms. The IHH activists lost the protection of their civilian status when they directly participated in the hostilities.
- The Rules of Engagement for the operation provided an authority to use force that reflected the nature of a law-enforcement operation.
- The IHH activists carried out the violence on board the Mavi Marmara by arming themselves with a wide array of weapons, including iron bars, axes, clubs, slingshots, knives, and metal objects. These were weapons capable of causing death or serious injury. Further, the hostilities were conducted in an organized manner with IHH activists, among others, operating in groups when violently assaulting the IDF soldiers.
- The IHH activists used firearms against the IDF soldiers during the hostilities.

The commission examined 133 incidents in which force was used. The majority of the uses of force involved warning or deterring fire and less lethal weapons. The commission found that overall, the IDF personnel acted professionally in the faces of extensive and unanticipated violence. This included continuing to switch back and forth between less-lethal and lethal weapons in order to address the nature of the violence directed at them. The commission concluded that in 127 cases, the use of force appeared to be in conformity with international law. In six cases, the commission concluded that it had insufficient information to be able to make a determination. Three out of those six cases involved the use of live fire and three cases involved physical force; two incidents of kicking and one strike with the butt of a gun. In five out of the 127 incidents that appeared to be in conformity with international law, there was insufficient evidence to conclude that the use of force was also in accordance with law enforcement norms. However, in these cases, force appeared to be used against persons taking a direct part in hostilities and, as a consequence, was in conformity with international law.

=== Planning and organization ===
Regarding the planning and organization of the IDF mission to enforce the blockade, the commission stated that violent opposition to the boarding was not anticipated, and this had a direct impact on the operational tactics, rules of engagement, and training before the operation. However, the focus of the planning and organization of the operation on a lower level of resistance did not lead to a breach of international law, the commission said.

=== Conclusions ===
In its final remarks, the committee concluded that:

- "The naval blockade imposed on the Gaza Strip – in view of the security circumstances and Israel’s efforts to comply with its humanitarian obligations – was legal pursuant to the rules of international law."
- "The actions carried out by Israel on May 31, 2010, to enforce the naval blockade had the regrettable consequences of the loss of human life and physical injuries. Nonetheless, and despite the limited number of uses of force for which we could not reach a conclusion, the actions taken were found to be legal pursuant to the rules of international law."

== Criticism ==
Turkey and Palestinian leader Mahmoud Abbas dismissed the Israeli investigation and said it would not meet demands set by the UN Security Council. The Israeli newspaper Haaretz described the investigation as more and more like a "farce" and criticized its credibility and fairness. UN Secretary-General Ban Ki-moon repeated the demand for an independent investigation, stating that the Israeli investigation will not have international credibility.

Amnesty International called the commission a "whitewash," saying it "reinforces the view that the Israeli authorities are unwilling or incapable of delivering accountability for abuses of international law committed by Israeli forces." The Israeli human rights group Gisha said that "No commission of inquiry can authorize the collective punishment of a civilian population by restricting its movement and access, as Israel did in its closure of Gaza, of which the maritime closure was an integral part."

Political scientist Norman Finkelstein criticized the report for being a "whitewash." Finkelstein challenged the report's conclusion that the blockade did not deliberately cause hunger, arguing that the limitation of "civilian goods" to a "humanitarian minimum" suggested an intent to collectively punish the Gazan population, a claim not adequately addressed by the report. He specifically noted that the blockade prevented the entry of essential medical supplies and basic food items, including lentils, pasta, and tomato paste.

Furthermore, Finkelstein cited a report from the Israeli human rights organization Gisha, which detailed items restricted by the blockade. These items encompass a variety of goods such as spices (sage, coriander, ginger), food products (jam, halva, vinegar, nutmeg, chocolate, fruit preserves, seeds, nuts, biscuits, potato chips), and non-food items (musical instruments, notebooks, writing materials, toys, chicks, and goats). He argued that the restriction of these goods further indicated the punitive nature of the blockade.

The report's claim that the blockade complies with the principle of proportionality has also been contested. First, on the basis that the intentional infliction of starvation is not the only test of a blockade's legality. Second, a blockade causing a civilian population to be inadequately supplied with food to cause hunger may constitute a disproportionate effect.

The commission's chairman Jacob Turkel also criticized the structure of the commission and threatened to resign if its powers were not expanded. He has requested that the commission be recognized as an official state commission of inquiry with full powers under the Commissions of Inquiry law, have two more members, be allowed to subpoena witnesses and documents, warn those who testify before it that the panel's findings could harm them, and hire outside experts in relevant fields. In July 2010, the Israeli cabinet voted to expand the committee's powers to include subpoenas and receiving sworn testimony but with the proviso that they cannot speak with any IDF soldiers.

Israel's High Court of Justice provided strong support for the criticism against the absence of women on the commission, when it found for the petitioners, Israeli feminist NGOs led by Itach-Maaki: Women Lawyers for Social Justice. The petitioners challenged the absence of women on the commission, particularly after its expansion from three to five members, when it was no longer composed only of international law experts, but included a diplomat and a civil law expert. The Court ruled that by failing to nominate women, Israel's Government violated its duty under the Equal Rights for Women's Law. The Law was amended in 2005, following United Nations Security Council Resolution 1325. According to this Amendment, the Government has a duty to consider the "due representation" of women from all segments of the population in any policy-making committee, including on peace and security teams. Dismissing the Government's claims that it was too late to add new members to the commission because its work is too far advanced, and that there were no qualified women to be found, the High Court issued a decree ordering the Government to add at least one woman to the commission's panel. The Court added that if the Government approaches five qualified women and all of them refuse the invitation to serve on the commission, then this time around the Government would be considered as having fulfilled its legal obligation to consider women's representation. Two weeks after the Court's ruling, the Government announced that five women refused to serve on the commission, and that it therefore considered itself in compliance with the law. Justice Minister Yaakov Ne'eman, after reportedly lying to Government Cabinet on his actions toward nominating women, publicly expressed his view that the Court's ruling was a severe mistake.

The ruling, however, have made an ongoing impact on the governmental culture with regards to women. When, in August 2010, Prime Minister Netanyahu announced the launch of direct peace negotiations, he announced that he would abide by his legal duty and nominate women to the negotiation team. Shortly afterwards, when Defense Minister Ehud Barak established an investigative committee to inquire about the "Yoav Galant Document" affair, he too nominated a woman to that committee.

Others have criticized the composition of the committee, specifically that the advanced age of the three initial Israeli members (average age, 85) and that all members were male.
