= Canadian Tire guy =

Character in TV commercials for Canadian Tire

The Canadian Tire guy is a character played by actor Ted Simonett in a series of television commercials for Canadian Tire stores that ran for eight years. The character typically touted the features and benefits of products unique to Canadian Tire in a friendly, helpful everyday scenario.

In 2005, Canadian Tire changed advertising agencies, which led to a gradual phasing out of Simonett's character. In March 2006, he and on-screen wife "Gloria" were let go since the commercials had become the subject of parody, and as such were no longer considered effective. They have been parodied on Royal Canadian Air Farce, This Hour Has 22 Minutes, and the Rick Mercer Report. In many circles, particularly in relation to blog sites, Simonett's character - commonly referred to as the Canadian Tire Guy (TCTG) - has evoked particularly hostile reactions.

== Maclean's ==
The October 28, 2005 edition of Maclean's published an article that ridiculed Ted Simonett and his "Canadian Tire Guy" character. Shortly afterward, in March 2006, Canadian Tire unveiled its new ad campaign without Simonett.

== Ted Simonett ==
Ted Simonett (born 1953) is a Canadian actor most widely known for his work in Canadian Tire television commercials.

Simonett was raised in Kingston, Ontario, where he attended Loyalist Collegiate and Vocational Institute and later Queen's University. He spent time working in Britain, and since then has been a Toronto-based actor appearing in film, television, and on the stage. He became Canadian Tire's spokesman in 1997.

Little information about Simonett is available, as indicated in recent newspaper articles attempting to find out who the 'Canadian Tire guy' really is. He was signed with Canadian Tire with stipulations in his contract which prevented him from participating in interviews. Rumours circulated that there was a clause in his contract that required him to keep his trademark beard.

Simonett is also a wildlife and headshot photographer, with Canadian actors including Jackie English (TVO Kids), and Dan Lett.

=== Filmography ===
- Forever Mine (1999) (Mr. Galen)
- The Marriage Fool (1998) (TV) .... Falco ... a.k.a. Love After Death
- Blackjack (1998) (TV) .... Mark Smoot ... a.k.a. John Woo's Blackjack
- The Fixer (1998) (TV) .... Mike Jameson
- Short for Nothing (1998) .... Dad
- Night of the Twisters (1996) (TV) .... Stan
- Woman on the Run: The Lawrencia Bembenek Story (1993) (TV) .... Judge Skwieraski
- Broken (1992) .... Uncredited
- Sorry, Wrong Number (1989) (TV) .... Dave
- The Dream Team (1989) .... Yuppie
- Glory! Glory! (1989) (TV) .... Hank
- Switching Channels (1988) .... Tillinger
- Police Academy 4: Citizens on Patrol (1987) .... Copeland's partner
- I'll Take Manhattan (1987) (mini) TV Series
- Prescription for Murder (1987) (TV) .... Dr. Rosenberg

=== Television work ===
- Poltergeist: The Legacy playing "Don Gannon" in episode: "Lullaby" (episode # 2.14) 13 June 1997
- The Twilight Zone playing "Gerry" in episode: "The Trance" (episode # 3.10) 26 November 1988
- Captain Power and the Soldiers of the Future playing "Jim Mitchell" in episode: "The Intruder" (episode # 1.9) 15 November 1987
- The Littlest Hobo playing "Harrison" in episode: "The Clown" (episode # 3.14) 28 January 1982
- The Littlest Hobo playing "Dave Martindale" in episode: "Runaway" (episode # 2.15) 12 February 1981
