= Jerry S.T. Pitzul =

Major-General Jerry S.T. Pitzul, CMM CD QC, was the Judge-Advocate-General for the Canadian Forces at National Defence Headquarters in Ottawa, Ontario from 1998 to 2006.

Major-General Pitzul has enjoyed a distinguished legal career in the Canadian Forces and the public sector. He has held various appointments within the Office of the Judge-Advocate General, including that of Director of Law/Prosecutions and Appeals where he acted as chief prosecutor for the Canadian Forces. He was later appointed by the Minister of National Defence to the position of Deputy Chief Military Trial Judge where he presided over courts martial across Canada and in various parts of Europe including the former Republic of Yugoslavia.

In 1995, Major-General Pitzul retired from the Canadian Forces and accepted an appointment in Nova Scotia as Director of the Public Prosecution Service and lawful Deputy of the Attorney General where he was responsible for all Crown prosecutions within the province. He subsequently returned to the Canadian Forces in 1998 upon appointment by Order in Council to the position of Judge Advocate General in the rank of Brigadier-General.

Major-General Pitzul has written various publications on military law, including A Handbook for Military Prosecutors. He has also authored several manuals for military judges on trial procedure, substantive criminal law, and evidence.

Major-General Pitzul earned his Bachelor of Administration (BAD) in 1975 from the Collège militaire royal de Saint-Jean, Québec. He later earned his Master of Business Administration (MBA) in 1976 and his Bachelor of Laws (LLB) in 1979 at Dalhousie University in Halifax, Nova Scotia.

In December 2000 Major-General Pitzul was appointed to the Order of Military Merit (Canada) in its highest grade, that of Commander.

Major-General Pitzul was promoted to his present rank effective 8 April 2002 and was reappointed as Judge-Advocate-General of the Canadian Forces for a further four-year term effective 14 April 2002. He has since retired and been replaced by Brigadier-General Ken Watkin.

On 18 October 2002, Major-General Pitzul was appointed Queen's Counsel by the Province of Nova Scotia.

Preceded by Brig. Gen. Pierre G. Boutet	Judge Advocate General; 1998-2006	Succeeded by Brig. Gen. Ken Watkin
