= École secondaire publique Mille-Îles =

Location
- 1290 Wheathill St. Kingston, Ontario, K7M 0H4; Canada; 44.24739871312551°N 76.56092979730326°W

Information
- School type: Secondary
- Motto: felicitas per doctrinam
- Founded: 1995
- School board: CEPEO
- Principal: Ali Belhis
- Grades: 7-12
- Enrollment: 234
- Language: French
- Website: www.mille-iles.cepeo.on.ca (in French)
- Last updated: Jan. 31st 2026

École secondaire publique Mille⁻Îles is a high school in Kingston, Ontario and was initially started as a French program within Kingston Collegiate and Vocational Institute (KCVI) in 1977. In 1980, it became a separate module serving students in grades 9 to OAC. The establishment of a distinct francophone public high school was first suggested in 1987, and the project came to fruition in 1994, which led to the inauguration of Mille-Îles as a distinct entity in 1995, still within the KCVI building. The school moved to its present location, the former location of Calvin Park Public School, in 1999, when it also expanded to welcome students in grades 7 and 8.

In April 2012, the school moved to a new building (a renovated elementary school), which combined École élémentaire publique Madeleine-de-Roybon and Mille-Îles under the same roof. The schools, although they kept their separate identities, welcomed students from kindergarten to grade 12. There was also a daycare service offered by La garderie éducative.

In January 2018, it was announced that a French community hub would be built. "The two French boards in Kingston — the Conseil des Ecoles Catholiques du Centre-Est de l’Ontario (CECCE) and the Conseil des Écoles Publiques de l’Est de l’Ontario (CEPEO) — will see close to $24 million to build the new combined facility for École secondaire publique Mille-Îles and École secondaire catholique Marie-Rivier, which will also include the Centre Culturel Frontenac community hub."

In September 2018, while waiting for the construction of the new building, the school moved into the old St-Patrick Catholic Elementary school, which was shut down by the Algonquin and Lakeshore Catholic District School Board in 2015.

In March 2020, it was announced that the French community hub would not be ready until at least the 2021–2022 school year. In December 2022, an article published on Radio-Canada, mentioned the school was going to be ready in September 2023. Students were in fact able to start the 2023-2024 school year in the new building. The new school was inaugurated in September 2023.

== Motto ==
The school motto is "felicitas per doctrinam," which means "happiness through learning."

== Special programs ==
Mille-Îles offers the IB Middle Years Programme (since February 2012) and the IB Diploma Programme (since March 2016). Additionally, Mille-Îles offers the Specialist High Skills Major (SHSM) program, which is a program offered by the Ontarian Government.

== See also ==
- Education in Ontario
- List of secondary schools in Ontario
