= Calvin Park Public School =

Location
- 153 Van Order Drive; Kingston, Ontario, K7M 1B9; Canada; 44°14′18″N 76°31′14″W

Information
- School type: Public, Middle school
- Founded: 1965
- School board: Limestone District School Board
- Superintendent: Andre Labrie
- Area trustee: David Jackson
- School number: 076120
- Administrator: Liz Suriyuth & Jennifer Osborne
- Principal: Elizabeth Suriyuth
- Grades: 7-8
- Enrollment: 386 (September 2008)
- Language: English
- Colours: Red and Blue
- Team name: Calvin Comets
- Website: calvinpark.limestone.on.ca

Calvin Park Public School is a school for grade 7 and 8 students located in the same building as Loyalist Collegiate and Vocational Institute (LCVI), at 153 Van Order Drive in Kingston, Ontario, Canada. It is part of the Limestone District School Board.

== History ==
When the building that houses both schools was first opened in 1963, Calvin Park was called "Loyalist Senior Public School" (LSPS). In 1965, Calvin Park Public School opened in a new two-storey building located directly across the street from LCVI. While the school hosted Kindergarten to grade 8 students, its primary function was as a senior public school ("junior high") for students from five K-6 elementary schools in Kingston's west end who would eventually attend LCVI. By the early 1980s, K-6 students had relocated to nearby Centennial Public School, and Calvin Park had exclusively hosted grades 7 and 8. With declining enrollment at both schools, the grade 7 and 8 students were relocated into available space at LCVI, and the old Calvin Park building became home to an adult education centre and later the French language high school École secondaire publique Mille-Iles.

Calvin Park is now host to four programs: the Core program (ordinary Ontario curriculum), the Challenge program (advanced learning), the LEAP Program (Limestone Education through the Arts - integrating the arts into a normal curriculum) and the Atlas program (Applying Technology for Learning, Aptitude and Success).

School sports teams are given the nickname "Comets." The school colours are navy blue, and white.
