= Yaakov Dori =

Israeli general (1899-1973)

- יַעֲקֹב דּוֹרִי
- Dori in 1949
- Born: Yaakov Dostrovsky; October 8, 1899; Odessa, Odessa Uezd, Kherson Governorate, Russian Empire
- Died: January 22, 1973 (aged 73); Haifa, Israel
- Military career
- Allegiance: United Kingdom; Israel
- Branch: Haganah; British Army (World War I); Israel Defense Forces
- Service years: 1917–1949
- Rank: Rav Aluf (highest rank)
- Commands: Chief of Staff of the Haganah; IDF Chief of Staff
- Conflicts: World War I 1948 Arab-Israeli War

Yaakov Dori (Hebrew: יַעֲקֹב דּוֹרִי; October 8, 1899 – January 22, 1973), born Yaakov Dostrovsky, was the first Chief of Staff of the Israel Defense Forces (IDF). He was also the President of the Technion – Israel Institute of Technology.

== Biography ==
Yaakov Dostrovsky (later Dori) was born in Odessa in present-day Ukraine (then part of the Russian Empire) to Tzvi and Myriam Dostrovsky. The family immigrated to Ottoman Palestine following the anti-Jewish pogrom in Odessa in 1905. Upon completing high school at the Hebrew Reali School in Haifa, he enlisted in the Jewish Legion of the British Army during World War I. Following the war he studied engineering at the University of Ghent.

His son, Yerachmiel Dori, served as commander of the IDF's Engineering Corps. His daughter, Etana Padan, was a biochemist and a professor of microbial ecology at the Hebrew University of Jerusalem. His youngest son, Zvi Dori, was a Chemistry Professor at the Technion and the founder of the first Israeli Science Museum (Technoda). Israel Dostrovsky, physical chemist and former President of the Weizmann Institute of Science, was his first cousin.

== Military career ==
When he returned to Palestine in 1926, he joined the Haganah and adopted the underground name of "Dan". In the Haganah, he was the commander of the Haganah Forces of Haifa.

In 1939, Dori was appointed Chief of Staff of the Haganah, a position he held until 1946. As CoS Haganah it was Yaakov Dori's duty to take the Haganah from a diffuse self-defense organisation to a model army. From 1946-47 he also headed the Palestinian Jewish delegation sent to purchase arms in the United States.

When the IDF was formed, Dori took over as its first Chief of Staff. Yet, despite his good command and organizational skills, he was already suffering from failing health and had difficulty commanding his troops during the 1948 Palestine War, so he was forced to rely heavily on his deputy, Yigael Yadin. He completed his term as Chief of Staff on November 9, 1949, and retired from the military. He was succeeded by his deputy, Yadin. After his release from the army, however, he continued to wear the officer's pin he was awarded when he first became a second lieutenant.

== Academic career ==
Upon leaving the IDF, Dori was appointed chairman of the nation's Science Council, attached to the Prime Minister's office. He was later appointed president of the Technion – Israel Institute of Technology in Haifa in 1951, a position he held until 1965. He followed Shlomo Kaplansky, and was followed by Alexander Goldberg.

== Legacy and commemoration ==
The Israel Defense Forces base at Tel HaShomer, one of the largest in Israel, is named after Ya'akov Dori. A prominent road in Haifa and a street in Beersheba are both named after him.
