= Reuven Merhav =

- ראובן מרחב
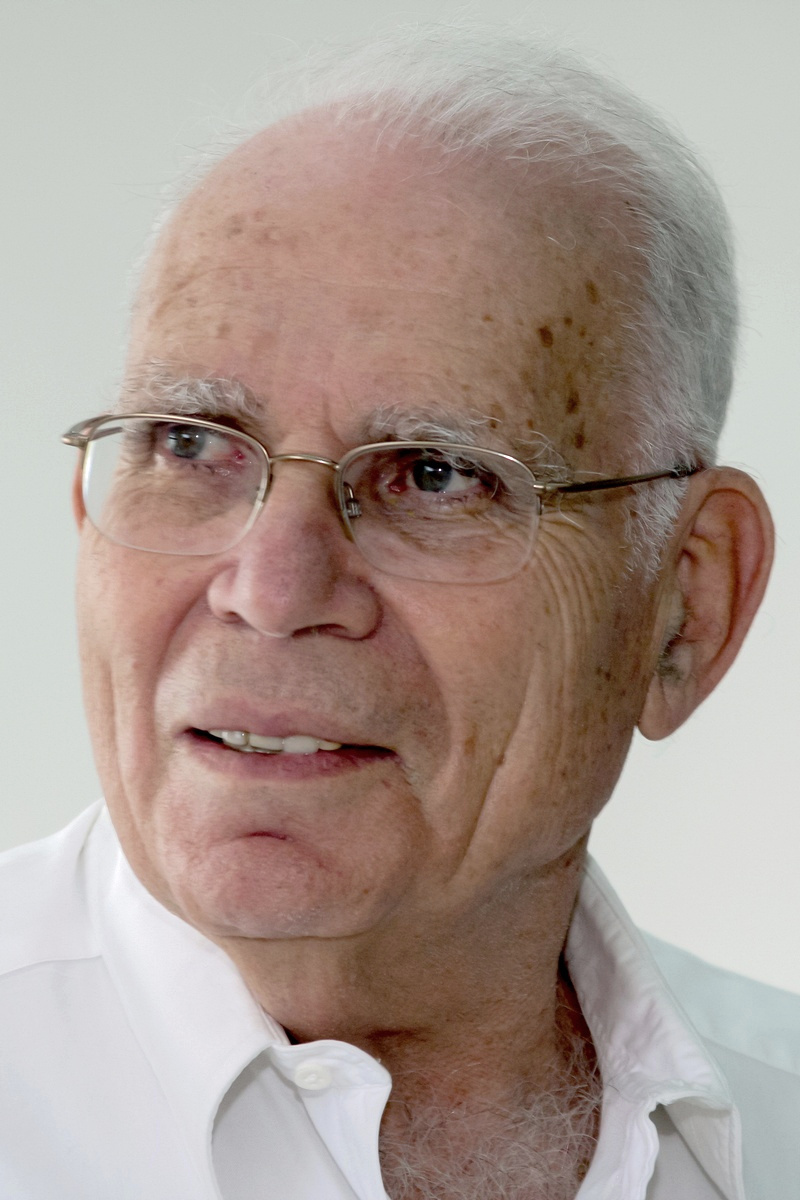
- Born: 1936 (age 89–90); Tel Aviv, Mandatory Palestine

Reuven Merhav (Hebrew: ראובן מרחב; born 1936) is an Israeli diplomat and an intelligence official.

== Early life and education ==
Merhav is the son of Jewish parents who escaped Nazi persecution in Germany. He graduated from the School of History at Tel Aviv University and from the Institute of Asian and African Studies of the Hebrew University of Jerusalem, where he was elected President of the National Union of Israeli Students, before earning his degree in Islamic Studies, Middle Eastern history and Arabic language and literature.

He previously served, as part of his compulsory military service, in the Israel Defense Forces (IDF) in a paratrooper commando unit which was active in reprisal operations carried out by the IDF in the 1950s and 1960s in response to frequent Fedayeen terror attacks. In 1956, Merhav returned to Kibbutz Dvir in southern Israel, where he was part of its Israeli founding group.

== Career ==
Merhav worked in Israeli intelligence from 1961 to 1983 in missions overseas in Ethiopia, Kenya and Iran before the Iranian Revolution. He was Director General of the Israeli Ministry of Foreign Affairs from 1988 to 1991. A fellow of the Jerusalem Institute for Israel Studies (JIIS) since 1995 till present, he was called by Prime Minister Ehud Barak to the 2000 Camp David Summit in an effort to end the Israeli-Palestinian conflict. He was appointed as a member of the Turkel Commission, which investigated the 2010 Gaza flotilla raid, and the Blockade of Gaza.

He worked in Israeli intelligence from 1961 to 1983 specializing mainly in the Horn of Africa and the wide Middle East. Following a few years at headquarters, he was posted to Addis Ababa, Nairobi and Teheran. He then was appointed to another position at headquarters. He joined the Ministry of Foreign Affairs and worked in a diplomatic mission in Lebanon from 1983 to 1984, advising during the Lebanon War which had ramifications for Israel. He worked in Hong Kong from 1985 to 1988 fostering paths to China prior to establishing diplomatic relations between Israel and the People’s Republic of China.

Merhav was Director General of the Israeli Ministry of Foreign Affairs from 1988 to 1991. In this capacity, he was chief negotiator in the Taba negotiations with Egypt about withdrawal from Sinai as part of the Egypt–Israel peace treaty, which laid foundations for the establishment of diplomatic relations with China; established the first Israeli mission in Beijing in 1991, and negotiated diplomatic and administrative terms to allow "Operation Solomon" to rescue the Jewish community in Ethiopia in May 1991. He was then appointed Director General of the Israeli Ministry of Immigrant Absorption from 1992 to 1993, when the Ministry focused on the integration of Ethiopian Jews in Israel.

He worked at the Operational Theory Research Institute, an IDF organ, as advisor and tutor on geopolitical subjects from 1999 to 2007.

He lectured at the Hebrew University's Federmann Graduate School of Public Policy and Government from 2006 to 2008.

== Volunteering ==
Merhav is the 11th and current Chair of the Presidium of the Association of Israelis of Central European Origin, and a member of the Board of Directors of the Claims Conference.

In 2009, he was appointed leader of the Israeli delegation to the 2009 Holocaust Era Assets Conference (HEAC), convened in Prague under the auspices of the Czech Republic. He is special advisor to the Head of the European Sho'ah Legacy Institute (ESLI) in Prague, the monitoring organ for HEAC resolutions. He was nominated by the foreign minister of the Czech Republic as member of the ESLI Honorary Board in 2015.

He co-wrote "The Role of the Hashemite Kingdom of Jordan in a Future Permanent Status Settlement in Jerusalem: Legal, Political and Practical Aspects".

In 2001, he was elected to the executive committee of the Council for Peace and Security. This is a non-partisan body of retired IDF, intelligence community and foreign affairs officials, academics and experts, for promotion of regional peace arrangements.

He was the founding and first chairman of the executive committee of the Max Stern Academic College of Emek Yezreel from 1995 to 2000 as well as the founding and first chairman of the Ethiopian National Project, a tripartite project of the Ethiopian Community, the Government of Israel and world Jewry, to advance education among Ethiopian youth from 2002 to 2007.

Since 1993, he has been a member of various public committees and organs, including the National Labour Court.

In 2000, he was a member of the panel selecting recipients of the Israel Prize, in the category of 'Special contribution to state and society'.
