= Geneviève Bernatchez =

Canadian Forces officer

- Military career
- Allegiance: Canada
- Branch: Royal Canadian Navy
- Service years: 1987–2023 (38 years)
- Rank: Rear admiral
- Commands: Judge Advocate General
- Awards: Order of Military Merit; Canadian Forces' Decoration

Geneviève Bernatchez, OMM CD, is a former Canadian Forces officer who has served as the fifteenth judge advocate general (JAG) from June 27, 2017 to June 27, 2023. She held the rank of Rear admiral in the Royal Canadian Navy. She was the first woman to serve as JAG.

== Background ==
Bernatchez is a native from Gaspé, Québec. She began her military career in 1987, joining the Naval Reserve Division HMCS Donnacona in Montréal as a Naval cadet. She studied law at the Université de Montréal and was called to the bar in 1993; she also holds a masters of international legal studies degree, with a specialization in national security law, from Georgetown University in Washington, D.C. She transferred to the Regular Force in 1997, working as a military lawyer in the JAG's office.

In 1999, Bernatchez deployed with the Canadian Forces Air Command during the Kosovo war.

Rear admiral Bernatchez retired in 2023, after serving 38 years in the Canadian Armed Forces.

== Awards and decorations ==
Bernatchez's personal awards and decorations include the following:

Ribbon	Description	Notes
	Order of Military Merit (OMM)	Appointed Officer(OMM) on 4 October 2018
	General Service Medal (Canada)	Op Echo (24 Mars-10 Jun 1999)
	Canadian Peacekeeping Service Medal	
	Canadian Forces' Decoration (CD)	with two Clasp for 32 years of service
