= Shlomo Kaplansky =

Labour Zionist politician

- שלמה קפלנסקי
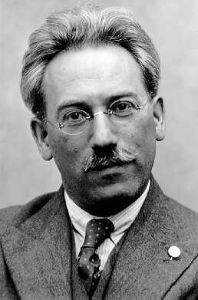
- Shlomo Kaplansky (1950)
- Born: 7 March 1884; Białystok, Russian Empire (now Białystok, Poland)
- Died: 7 December 1950 (aged 66); Haifa, Israel
- Known for: President of the Technion – Israel Institute of Technology
- Office: Secretary of the World Union of Poalei Zion
- Political party: Labour Zionist

Shlomo Kaplansky (Hebrew: שלמה קפלנסקי; born 7 March 1884 in Białystok - died 7 December 1950 in Haifa) was a Labour Zionist politician, who served as the secretary of the World Union of Poalei Zion. During the 1920s he was a leading advocate of a bi-national state in Palestine. Kaplansky was the President of the Technion – Israel Institute of Technology.

== Biography ==
Kaplansky was one of the founders of Poale Zion, a Marxist-Jewish group. He was a Poale Zion delegate to the 10th Zionist Congress (Basle, August 1911) at which he raised the question of relations with the Arabs and advocated explaining to them the benefits that the Zionist enterprise could bring them.

In June 1914, he argued that sharecroppers being evicted following Zionist land purchases should be given land outside Palestine. He was profoundly shaken by the First World War which led to his opposition to notions of armed conflict in Palestine and he hoped for the realization of Zionism by peaceful means.

In 1919, he envisioned that "both people in this country, Jews and Arabs, are guaranteed national autonomy on a personal basis, and will enjoy national equity of rights in municipalities and local governments" and that "the national languages of Jews and Arabs will enjoy equal status."

He became head of the World Union of Poale Zion in Vienna and in the summer of 1920 he and David Ben-Gurion were sent to set up a Poale Zion office in London. The office was in rooms in Petticoat Lane with Moshe Sharett working part-time translating Yiddish into English. They succeeded in becoming affiliated to the British Labour Party under the name of 'The Jewish Socialist Labour Party', claiming membership of 3,000—although actual membership was then a few hundred. One issue that they tried to influence policy on was the northern border of Palestine which was being decided at the San Remo conference. They hoped that it would be extended as far as the Litani River. They had only limited success in influency Labour party Middle East policy and the office closed in March 1921.

Along with David Ben-Gurion, he had contacts with both Labour and the Independent Labour Party. He collaborated with the Independent Labour Party in setting up the Vienna International.

In Palestine, he became a member of Ahdut HaAvoda and attended their 3rd Congress held at Ein Harod in May 1924. At the time the British Mandate authorities were proposing the setting up of a legislative council. Kaplansky was in favour of supporting the initiative. "We should come to an agreement with the Arabs, and together demand the expansion of the parliament's jurisdiction and ultimate self rule." He proposed two assemblies: one of elected representatives which would inevitably have an Arab majority; the second would have equal numbers of Jews and Arabs. He called for cooperation with the Arabs without British supervision and for the establishment of settlements all over the country with a vision of a bi-national state.

Ben-Gurion was strongly opposed to these proposals which he called "Kaplansky's error". He opposed negotiations with Arabs since their leadership was from the "effendi" ruling class and called for the development of ties with an Arab working class. He wanted the separation of the two people, Arab and Jew, under British supervision with Jewish settlements in concentrations as a prelude to a Jewish State. The Congress rejected Kaplanski's proposals. Five years later Ben-Gurion reversed his position on federal institutions and, in 1936, he accepted the idea of negotiations with effendis.

In 1925, Kaplansky was director of the Zionist Organisation Settlement Department in Jerusalem.

In 1927, Ben-Gurion called for his resignation as the Ahdut HaAvoda representative on the Zionist Executive over the way relief was being distributed to unemployed Jews. The resignation call was rejected by the Histadrut but Kaplansky did resign later in the year, following the Zionist Congress in Basel, September 1927. He was appointed chairman of the Histadrut economic committee.

During the 1928 discussions between Hapoel Hatzair and Ahdut HaAvoda which led to the formation of Mapai he threatened to resign because the manifesto was not socialist enough. In 1929, Kaplansky returned to the Zionist Executive and was a member of the delegation from Palestine to the Jewish Labour Congress held in Berlin, 27 September 1929.

Kaplansky was appointed as the President and Director of Technion in 1931, a position he held until 1950. Under Kaplansky's leadership Technion was developed into a technological university of Central European type. He was preceded by Joseph Breuer, and succeeded by Yaakov Dori.

The 21st Zionist Congress held in Geneva, August 1939, appointed Kaplansky as head of a committee of enquiry into Arab–Jewish relations which reported to a conference convened in Palestine by Chaim Weizmann in 1945.

In May 1942 Kaplansky presided over a special conference which led to the formation of the "V-League to help the Soviet Union" which raised funds for the Soviet war effort.
