= Alexander Goldberg (chemical engineer) =

Israeli chemical engineer

- אלכסנדר גולדברג
- Born: 1906; Wilno, Russian Empire (now Vilnius, Lithuania)
- Died: 1985 (aged 78–79)
- Occupation: Chemical engineer
- Known for: President of the Technion – Israel Institute of Technology (1965–1973)

Alexander Goldberg (Hebrew: אלכסנדר גולדברג; 1906-1985) was an Israeli chemical engineer. In 1965–1973, he served as President of the Technion – Israel Institute of Technology.

== Biography ==
Alexander Goldberg was born in Wilno, Russian Empire (now Vilnius, Lithuania), studied in London, and immigrated to Israel in 1948.

Goldberg was a chemical engineer, and was general director of the chemical firm Chemicals and Phosphates, at which he began to work in 1948. He also held the post of managing director of the Negev Phosphates Co., and was a member of the board of the Dead Sea Works.

Goldberg was President of the Technion – Israel Institute of Technology from 1965 to 1973. He was preceded by Yaakov Dori, and followed by Amos Horev.

== See also ==
- Education in Israel
