= Max Reis (chemical engineer) =

Chemical Engineer

Max W Reis
- מקס רייס
- Born: Max Walter Reis; 1927
- Died: 2014 (aged 86–87)
- Education: Imperial College London (PhD. in chemical engineering)
- Occupation: chemical engineer
- Known for: President of the Technion – Israel Institute of Technology

Max Walter Reis (Hebrew: מקס רייס; 1927-2014) was a chemical engineer who was President of the Technion – Israel Institute of Technology from 1986–1990.

== Biography ==
Reis attended Imperial College London, where he obtained a PhD. in chemical engineering. Reis was President of the Technion – Israel Institute of Technology from 1986–1990.
