= Jacob Turkel =

Israeli judge (1935–2023)

- יעקב טירקל
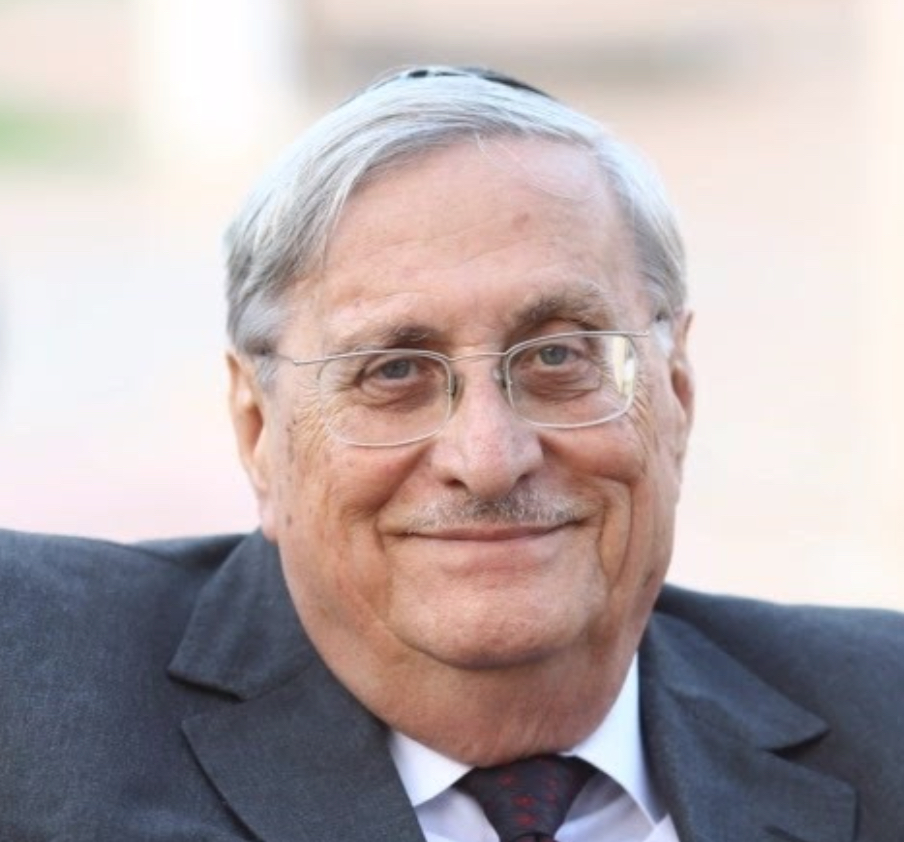
- Turkel in 2018
- Born: 24 March 1935; Tel Aviv, Mandatory Palestine
- Died: 29 May 2023 (aged 88); Tel Aviv, Israel
- Other name: Yaakov
- Education: Hebrew University of Jerusalem
- Known for: Former Supreme Court of Israel Justice

Jacob Turkel (Hebrew: יעקב טירקל; 24 March 1935 – 29 May 2023) was an Israeli judge who was a Supreme Court of Israel Justice. Turkel served as a judge for 38 years, a decade of that time on the Israeli Supreme Court. In June 2010, he was appointed to head the Israeli special independent Turkel Commission of Inquiry into the Gaza flotilla raid.

== Biography ==
Turkel was born in Tel Aviv in 1935 to a family that had immigrated from Vienna. When he was five the family moved to Jerusalem, where Turkel attended Ma'aleh, a state religious school. Turkel studied law at Hebrew University of Jerusalem, graduating from its law school in 1960.

Turkel died in Tel Aviv on 29 May 2023, at age 88.

== Judicial career ==
From 1967 onwards, Turkel served on various courts, including the Shalom Court, as a Regional Court judge. From 1980 to 1995 he served as president of the Beersheba District Court (during which time he took two years off to serve as an acting Supreme Court justice).

Turkel served as an Israeli Supreme Court Justice from 1995 until 2005.

In August 2000 he wrote in an opinion that by filling in gaps of missing text in a 2,000-year-old Dead Sea Scroll, and deciphering and putting together scroll fragments, a scholar had shown "originality and creativity" that gave him a copyright in his work. In October 2000, he rejected an appeal by Holocaust survivors and the Simon Wiesenthal Center against the first Israeli performance of a work by German composer Richard Wagner, who Holocaust survivors and others say promoted anti-Semitism.

In June 2004, he issued a temporary injunction prohibiting the State of Israel from removing thousands of tons of earth and rubble mixed with assorted archaeologically rich artifacts lying on Jerusalem's Temple Mount. He still sat on a military court appeals panel as late as 2010.

Turkel was known during his tenure on the Supreme Court for writing a relatively large number of dissenting opinions, compared to his fellow Justices. This accorded with the Supreme Court opinion in which he wrote about the right of the individual to "shout out [his own] truth", and the article he wrote in Mehkarei Mishpat (Bar-Ilan University Law Review) in which he said: "The stand of the individual against an 'overwhelming majority' is not a negligible matter."

== Academic career ==
Turkel taught at Ben Gurion University of the Negev, the University of Tel Aviv, the law school of Netanya Academic College, and other academic institutions.

== Public commissions ==
Turkel headed a public commission that was set up in 1999 to reform Israel's inheritance law. The commission proposed in 2006 that the law's definition of a couple be altered from "husband and wife", so that it would apply to both gay and heterosexual couples. He also served as a member of the Committee of Judicial Appointments.

In June 2010, he was appointed by Israeli Prime Minister Benjamin Netanyahu to head the Israeli special independent commission of inquiry, referred to as the Turkel Commission, into the events in the flotilla in Gaza. The Commission investigated whether Israel's actions in preventing the arrival of ships in Gaza were in accordance with international law. It focused among other things on considering the security considerations for imposing a naval blockade on the Gaza Strip and the conformity of the naval blockade with the rules of international law; the conformity of the actions during the raid to principles of international law; and the actions taken by those who organized and participated in the flotilla, and their identities.

== Other roles ==
Turkel served as chairman of the Award Committee that administers the EMET Prize for Art, Science and Culture.

== See also ==
- Public Committee (Israel)
