= Judge Advocate General (Canada) =

Office of the Canadian Forces concerned with legal and judicial affairs

Judge Advocate General of the Canadian Armed Forces
- Juge-avocat général des Forces armées canadiennes
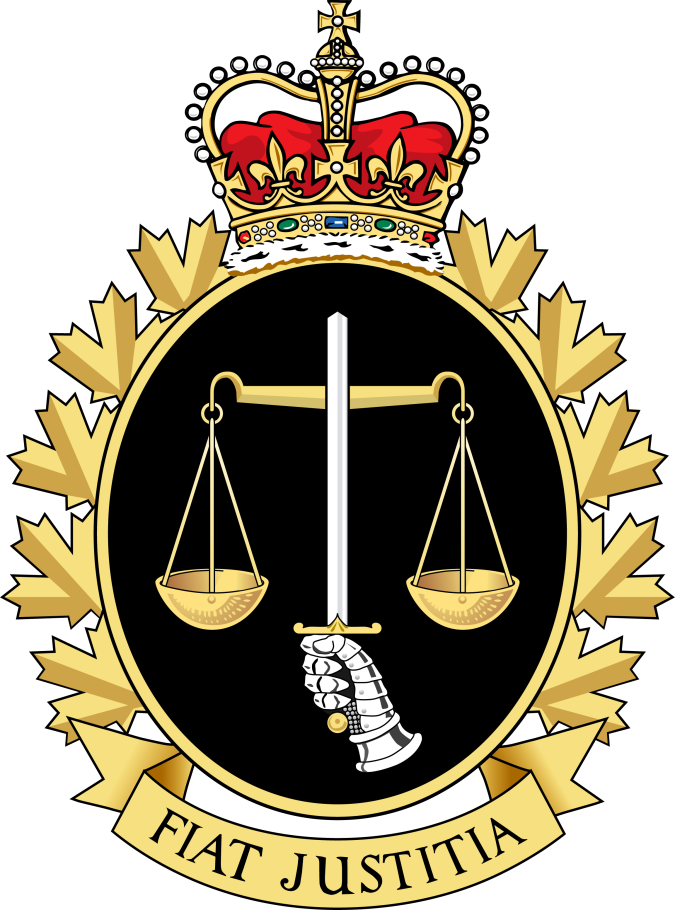
- Incumbent; Major-General Rob Holman since June 28, 2023
- Canadian Armed Forces; Department of National Defence
- Reports to: Minister of National Defence
- Appointer: Governor in Council; on the advice of the minister of national defence
- Term length: No more than 4 years; renewable
- Website: Official website

Judge Advocate General of the Canadian Armed Forces (French: juge-avocat général des Forces armées canadiennes) is the title of the senior legal officer who oversees the administration of military justice in the Canadian Armed Forces and provides legal advice on military matters to the governor general, the minister of national defence, the Department of National Defence and the Canadian Armed Forces. The office is defined in section 9 of the National Defence Act.

The 16th and current holder of the office is Major-General Rob Holman, since June 28, 2023.

== Office of the Judge Advocate General ==
The office consists of 159 regular force legal officer positions and 64 reserve force legal officer positions. Regular force legal officers are deployed as follows:

- National Defence Headquarters in Ottawa
- Eight Assistant Judge Advocate General (AJAG) offices: Esquimalt, Edmonton, Winnipeg, Toronto, Montreal, Halifax, NORAD HQ (USA), and Germany.
- Ten Deputy Judge Advocate (DJA) offices across Canada
- Four Regional Military Prosecutor (RMP) offices across Canada
- Canadian Forces Military Law Centre at the Royal Military College of Canada (RMC) in Kingston, Ontario
- Deputy Commander-in-Chief North American Aerospace Defence Command Headquarters (in Colorado Springs, Colorado, United States)
- with CF contingents deployed overseas
- in training with CF formations and units participating in major national and international exercises.

== List of judge advocates general ==
1. Major-General Henry Smith, 1911-1918
2. Lieutenant-Colonel Oliver Mowat Biggar, 1918-1920
3. Brigadier Reginald John Orde, 1920-1950
4. Brigadier-General William J. Lawson, 1950-1969
5. Brigadier-General Harold A. McLearn, 1969-1972
6. Brigadier-General James M. Simpson, 1972-1976
7. Major-General John Patterson Wolfe, 1976-1982
8. Brigadier-General Frank Karwandy, 1982-1986
9. Brigadier-General Robert L. Martin, 1986-1990
10. Commodore Peter R. Partner, 1990-1993
11. Brigadier-General Pierre G. Boutet, 1993-1998
12. Major-General Jerry S.T. Pitzul, 1998-2006
13. Brigadier-General Ken Watkin, 2006-2010
14. Major-General B. Blaise Cathcart, 2010-2017
15. Rear-Admiral Geneviève Bernatchez, 2017-2023
16. Major-General Rob Holman, 2023-

== See also ==
- Courts martial of Canada

United Kingdom

- Judge Advocate General of the Armed Forces
- Judge Advocate of the Fleet

United States

- Judge Advocate General's Corps
