= Amos Horev =

Israeli military official and expert

- עמוס חורב
- Horev in 1957 as a colonel
- Born: Amos Sochaczewer; 30 June 1924 (age 102); Jerusalem, British Mandate of Palestine
- Education: Technion – Israel Institute of Technology; Massachusetts Institute of Technology (BA and Master's in mechanical engineering)
- Known for: Former IDF Major-General; President of Technion; Military expert Nuclear scientist
- Title: Professor, General
- Spouse: Shoshana Horev
- Children: Yehiam (son)

Amos Horev (Hebrew: עמוס חורב; né Sochaczewer; born 30 June 1924) is an Israeli military official and expert. He served as a commander in the Palmach the elite force of the Haganah before the founding of the state, and was later an Israel Defense Forces (IDF) Major-General, Chief of Ordnance and subsequently Quartermaster General and Chief Scientist of the IDF, nuclear scientist, President of Technion University, and Chairman of Rafael. In June 2010, he was appointed to the Israeli special independent Turkel Commission of Inquiry into the 2010 Gaza flotilla raid.

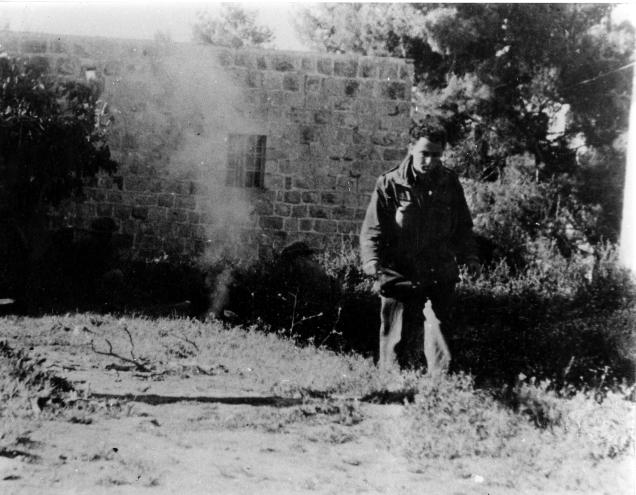
Amos Horev in Katamon during Operation Yevusi

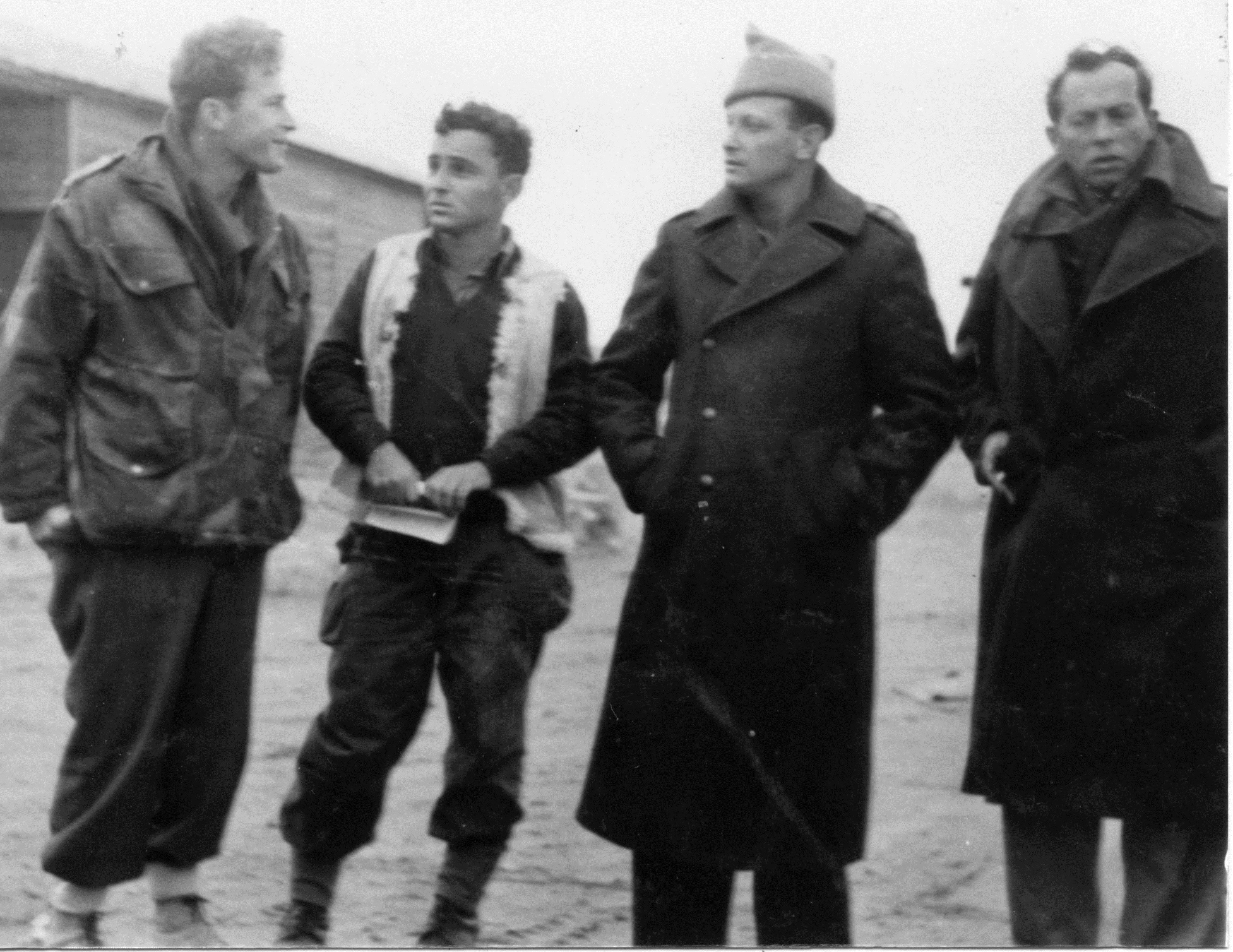
Amos Horev (second from the left) as a commander of the Palmach with Yigal Allon and Yitzhak Rabin in 1949 during Operation Horev

== Biography ==
=== Before the founding of the state of Israel ===
Amos Horev was born in Jerusalem on June 30, 1924. His father, Alec, was director of the mechanical workshop of the Hebrew University of Jerusalem. As a teenager he was among the founders of the Zionist youth movement Gordonia in Jerusalem. He studied at the gymnasium and from the age of 14 was a member of the Haganah. He fought against Arabs during the 1936–1939 Arab revolt in Palestine. He was appointed as an officer in 1940 and was one of the first recruits to Palmach when it was founded in 1941. During the war of independence he participated in many battles in the Jerusalem area and toward the end of the war was assistant to Yitzhak Rabin.

He later attended MIT, where he studied mechanical engineering.

He was President of Technion University from 1973 to 1982, replacing Alexander Goldberg and succeeded by Josef Singer.

=== Later life ===
Horev turned 100 on 30 June 2024.

== Decorations ==

1947–1949 Palestine war (with Palmach clap and defense of Jerusalem clap)	Sinai war	War of Attrition	Yom Kippur War

== Awards and recognition ==
Amos Horev was awarded the Israel Security Prize, and later was appointed as the Chairman of the Israel Security Prize and was the Chief Scientist of the Defense Ministry. He was Aluf (Major General), the highest rank in the Israel Defense Forces after the Chief of Staff.
