= Pittsburgh Township =

Former township in Ontario, Canada

Coordinates: 44°22′59″N 076°19′58″W

Pittsburgh is a former incorporated and now geographic township in Ontario, Canada. Located within Frontenac County, it was surveyed in 1787–1788 and named for William Pitt the Younger, the British prime minister. It was incorporated on January 1, 1850. The township was amalgamated into the city of Kingston effective January 1, 1998. The community still retains the name "Pittsburgh" within the government of Kingston.

Pittsburgh Township is home to Fort Henry, Canadian Forces Base Kingston, the Royal Military College of Canada and the historic community of Barriefield, Ontario. It includes the east side of the UNESCO-listed Rideau Canal at Kingston Mills (site of the Shafia family murders), hosts a handful of motels serving Ontario Highway 15 and former Ontario Highway 2, a federal prison (Pittsburgh and Joyceville Institutions in Joyceville, Ontario) and three museums (Military Communications and Electronics Museum, RMC Museum and MacLachlan Woodworking Museum).

Pittsburgh Township, separated from Kingston by the Cataraqui River, is linked to the downtown by the La Salle Causeway. The Waaban Crossing, located between the La Salle Causeway and Highway 401, opened in 2022.

== Former reeves ==
- John Marks 1850–1854
- Samuel Rees 1855–1857
- John Ruttan 1858
- Alexander McArthur 1859–1860
- Hugh McCaugherty 1861–1862
- James Hutton 1863
- William Ferguson Jr. 1864
- Martin Strachan 1865–1870, 1876–1879
- Peter Graham (W) 1871–1875
- Thomas Stark 1880–1881
- Richard Patterson 1882–1884
- Richard Anglin 1885
- Michael Graves 1886
- William Hutton 1887–1888, 1890
- David Trotter 1889
- Thompson Whitney 1891–1893
- William Toner 1894
- John Kane 1895–1896
- John Bennett 1897–1898
- Robert McAlpin 1899
- Daniel C. McLean 1900
- Daniel McLean 1901–1902
- Thomas Maxwell 1903
- James Greenlee 1904
- John McFarlane 1905–1906
- William Franklin (W) 1907–1908, 1912–1917
- Thomas Spence 1909
- James Gordon 1910
- David Rogers 1911
- George Maitland 1918–1920
- John Sibbit (W) 1921–1926, 1932–1938
- Alfred Franklin 1927–1928, 1931
- William Atkinson 1929–1930
- John McMaster (W) 1939–1943
- Wilson Franklin 1944–1945
- Colin Woods (W) 1946–1950
- Robert Wilson 1951–1953
- Earl Shepard (W) 1954–1958
- Eric Pearson (W) 1959–1966
- Hugh Wilson 1967–1968
- Wilmer Nuttal (W) 1969–1971
- Donald Hunter 1972
- Edward Swayne (W) 1973–1980
- Hans Westenberg 1981–1982
- Vincent Maloney 1983–1985
- Cameron English (W) 1986–1988
- Barry Gordon 1989–1994
- Carl Holmberg 1995–1997

== See also ==
- List of townships in Ontario
