= Kingston, Ontario =

City in Ontario, Canada

Kingston
- City (single-tier)
- City of Kingston
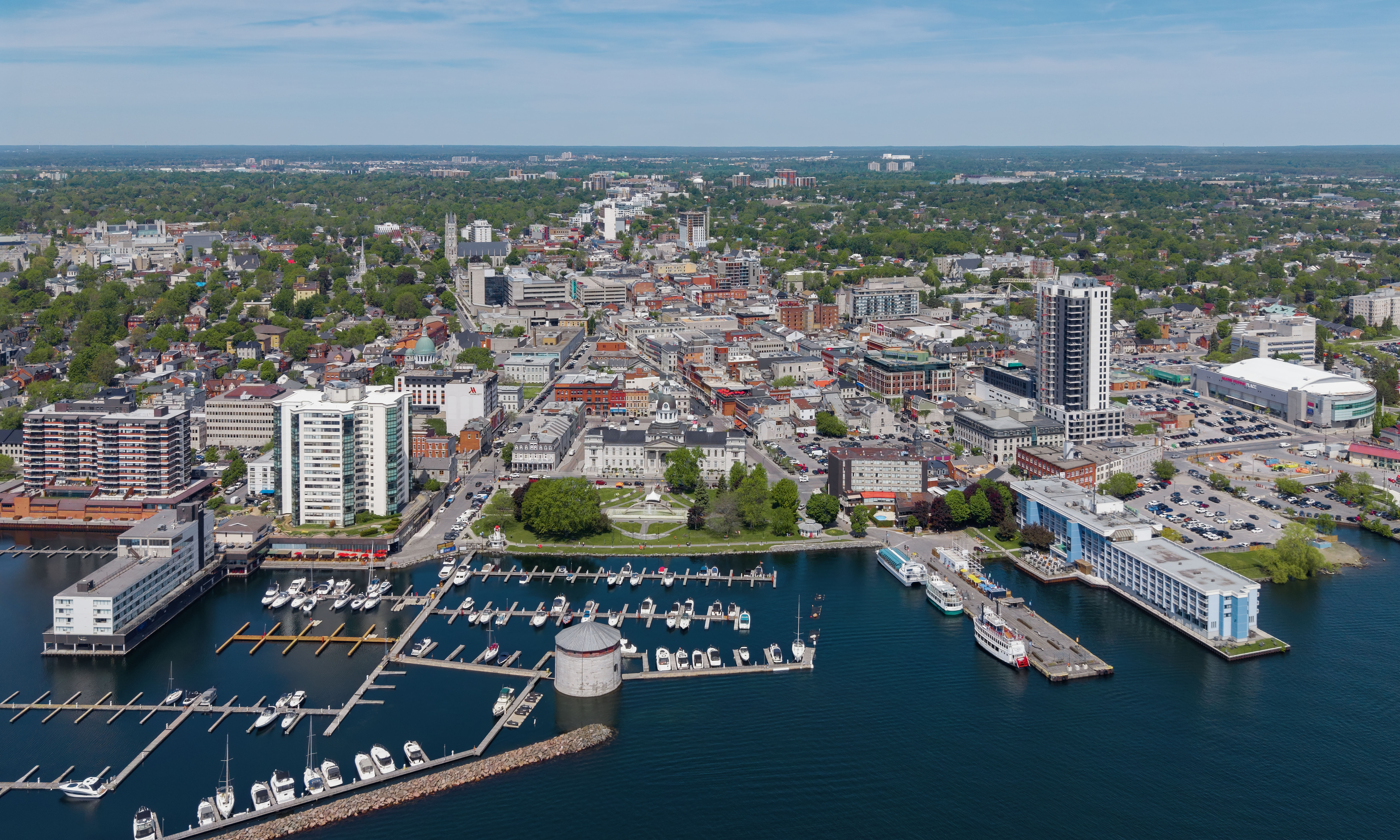
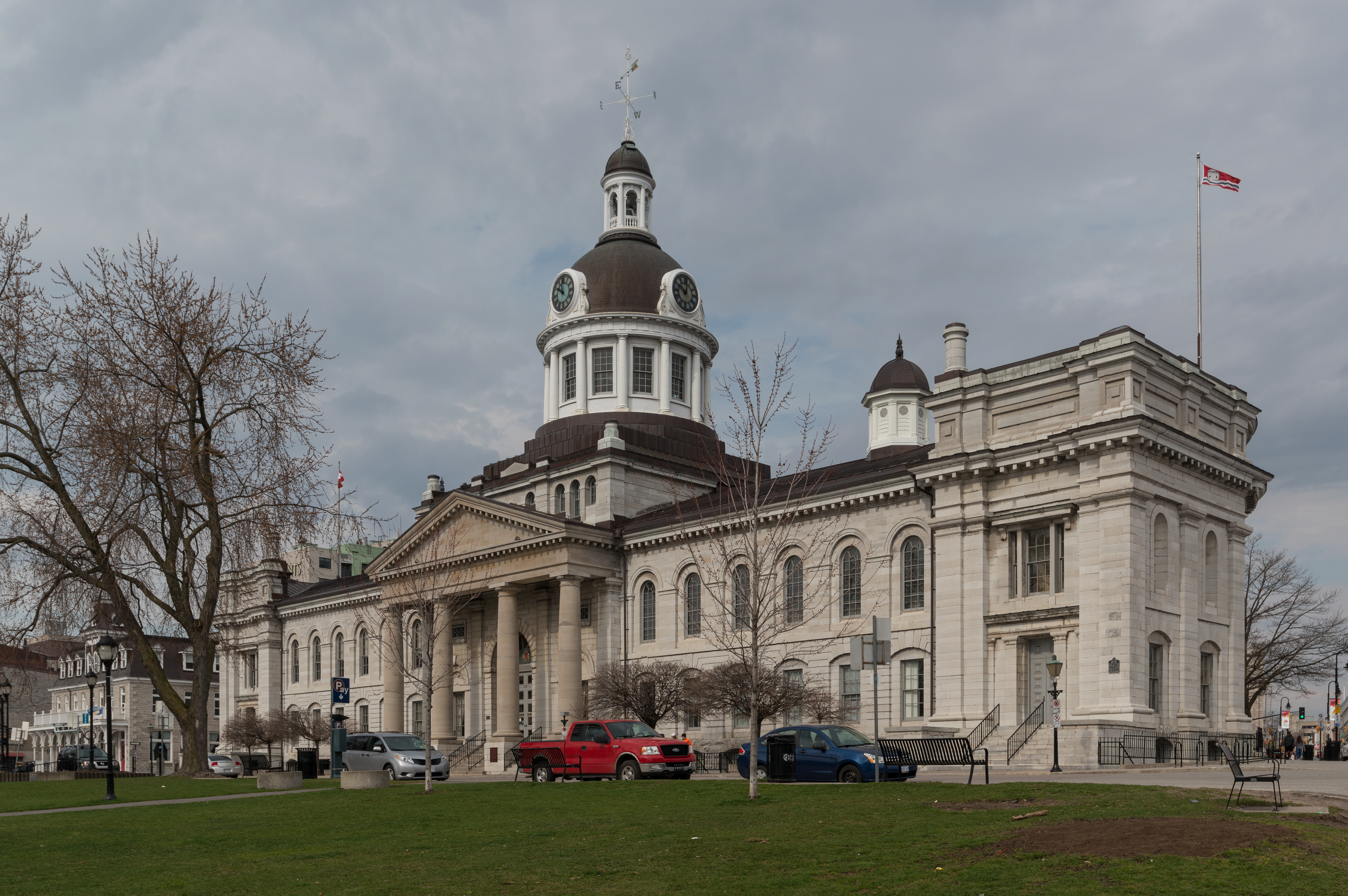
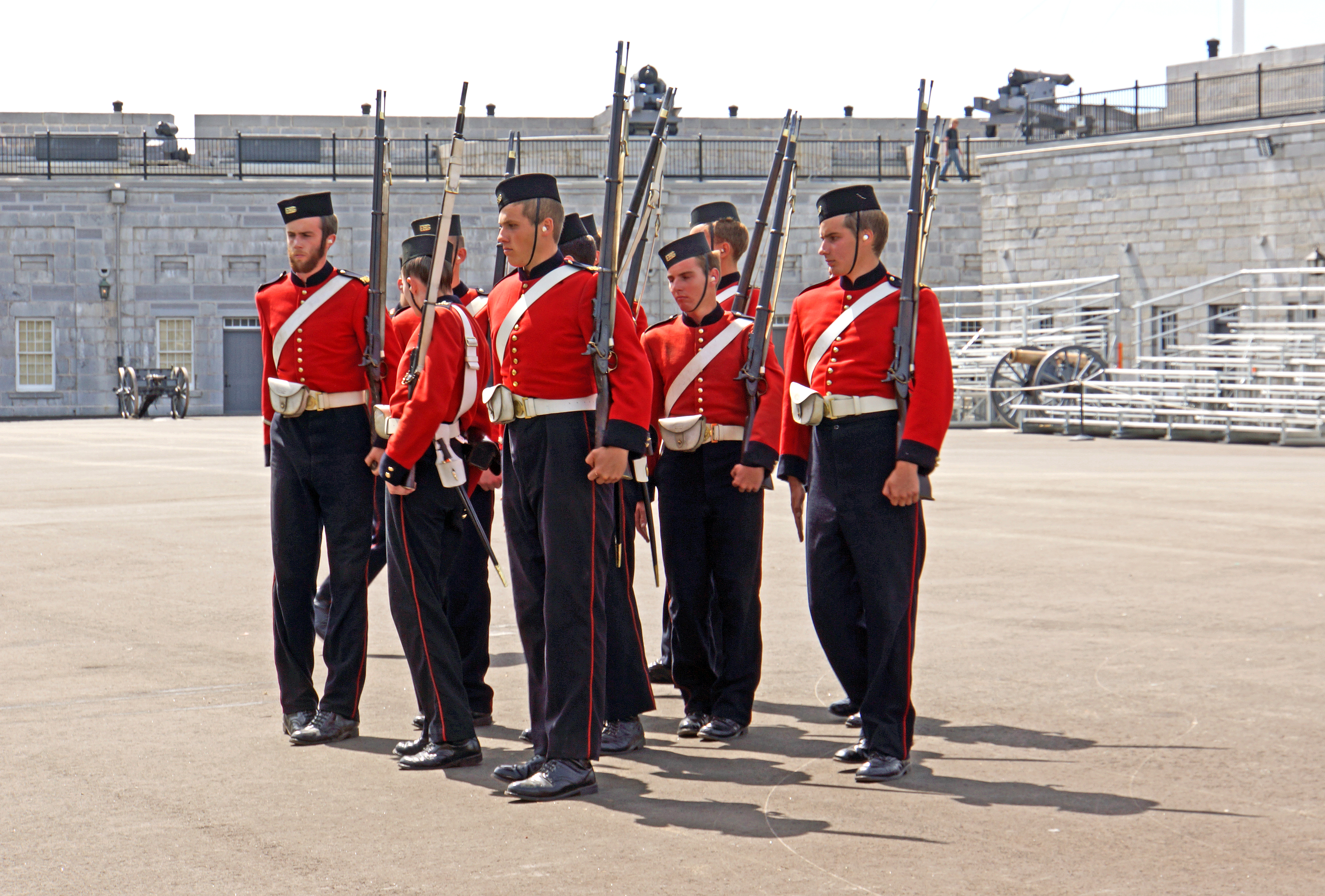
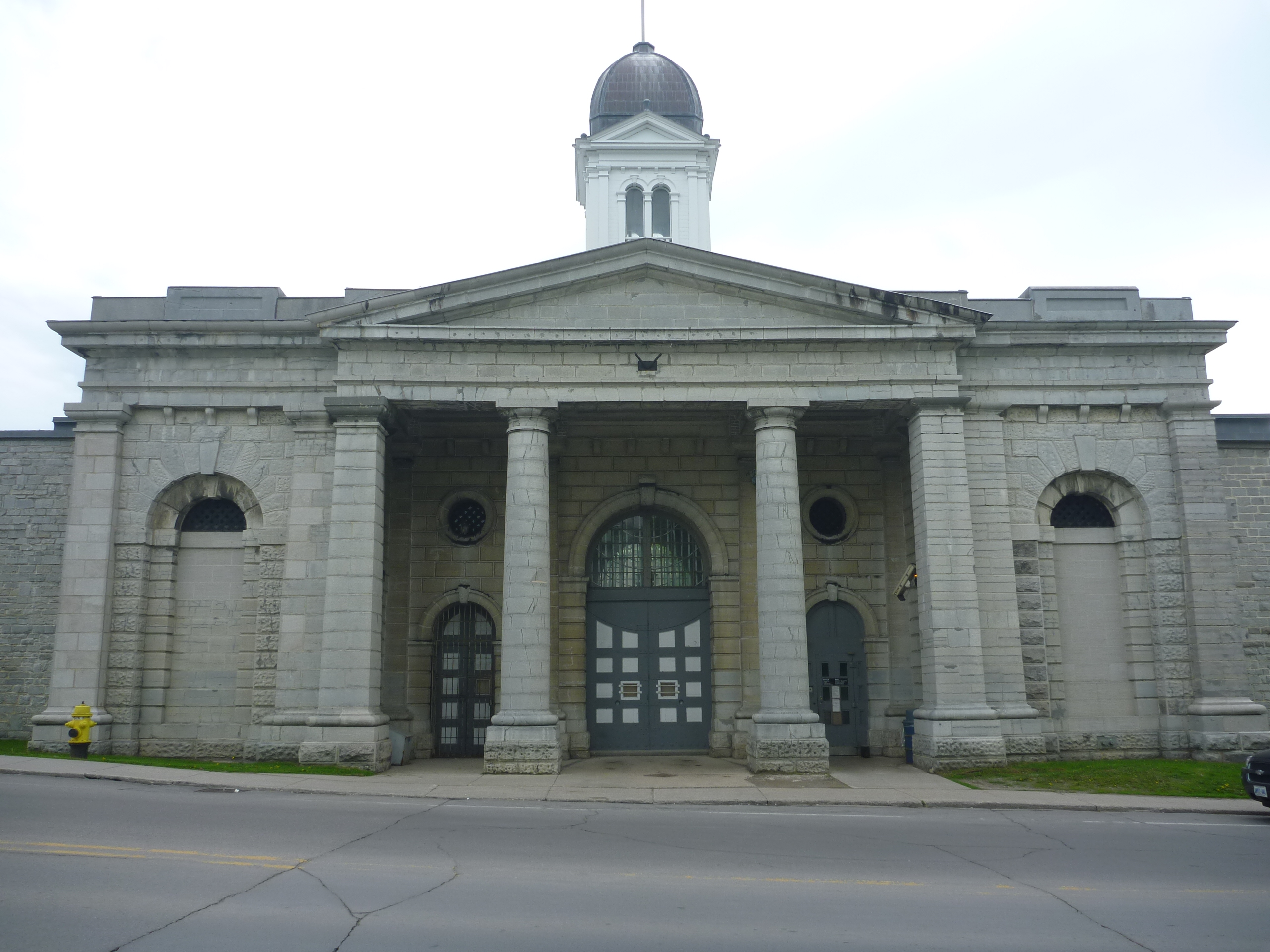
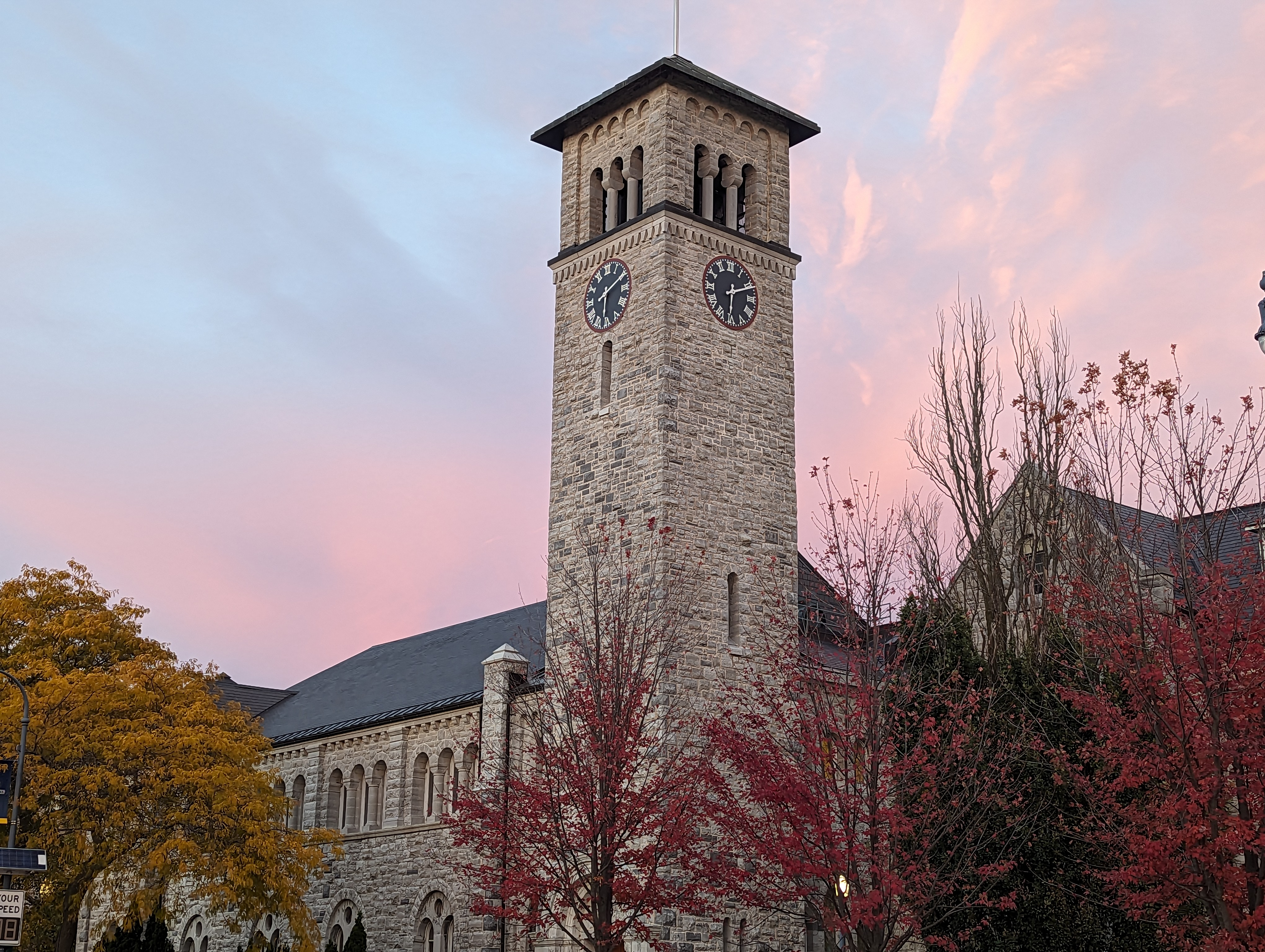
- Downtown Kingston City Hall Fort Henry Kingston Penitentiary Queen's University

- Flag Coat of arms Logo
- Nickname: "Limestone City"
- Motto(s): Antiquitate Civilitate Humanitate (Latin) ("A Civil And Creative Community with a Proud Past")
- Interactive map of Kingston
- Location within Southern Ontario Location within Canada
- Coordinates: 44°13′50″N 76°28′52″W
- Country: Canada
- Province: Ontario
- Established: 1673 (as Fort Cataraqui; later renamed Fort Frontenac)
- Incorporated: 1838 (as town); 1846 (as city)
- Amalgamated: 1998 (with Kingston and Pittsburgh Townships)

Government
  - Mayor: Conny Glenn
  - Governing Body: Kingston City Council
  - MPs: Mark Gerretsen (L); Scott Reid (C)
  - MPPs: Ted Hsu (OLP); John Jordan (PC)

Area
  - Land: 451.58 km^{2} (174.36 sq mi)
  - CMA: 1,919.17 km^{2} (741.00 sq mi)
- Elevation: 93 m (305 ft)

Population (2021)
  - Total: 132,485
  - Density: 293.4/km^{2} (760/sq mi)
  - CMA: 172,546
  - CMA density: 89.9/km^{2} (233/sq mi)
- Time zone: UTC−5 (EST)
  - Summer (DST): UTC−4 (EDT)
- Postal code span: K7K through K7P
- Area codes: 613, 343, 753
- GDP (Kingston CMA): CA$9.4 billion (2018)
- Website: www.cityofkingston.ca

Kingston is a city in Ontario, Canada, on the northeastern end of Lake Ontario. It is at the beginning of the St. Lawrence River and at the mouth of the Cataraqui River, the south end of the Rideau Canal. Kingston is located between the Prince Edward County and Thousand Islands tourist regions, and is nicknamed the "Limestone City" because it has many heritage buildings constructed using local limestone.

Growing European exploration in the 17th century and the desire for the Europeans to establish a presence close to local Native occupants to control trade led to the founding of a French trading post and military fort at a site known as "Cataraqui" (generally pronounced /kætəˈrɒkweɪ/ ka-tə-ROK-way) in 1673. The outpost, called Fort Cataraqui, and later Fort Frontenac, became a focus for settlement. After the Conquest of New France (1759–1763), the site of Kingston was relinquished to the British. Cataraqui was renamed Kingston after the British took possession of the fort, and Loyalists began settling the region in the 1780s.

Kingston was named the first capital of the United Province of Canada on February 10, 1841. While its time as a capital city was short and ended in 1844, the community has remained an important military installation. The city is a regional centre of education and health care, being home to a major university, a large vocational college, and three major hospitals.

Kingston was the county seat of Frontenac County until 1998. Kingston is now a separate municipality from the County of Frontenac. Kingston is the largest municipality in southeastern Ontario and Ontario's 10th largest metropolitan area. John A. Macdonald, the first prime minister of Canada, lived in Kingston.

== History ==
=== Naming history and etymology ===
Cataraqui, Kingston's original name, is a derivation of an Indigenous language name for the Kingston area. The word may mean "Great Meeting Place", "the place where one hides", "impregnable", "muddy river", "place of retreat", "clay bank rising out of the water", "where the rivers and lake meet", "rocks standing in water", or "place where the limestone (or clay) is".

Cataraqui was referred to as "the King's Town" or "King's Town" by 1787, in honour of King George III. The name was abbreviated to "Kingston" in 1788. Cataraqui today is an area around the intersection of Princess Street and Sydenham Road, where the village of Cataraqui (formerly known as Waterloo) was located. Cataraqui is also the name of a municipal electoral district.

=== Early Indigenous habitation ===
Archaeological evidence suggests people lived in the Kingston region as early as the Archaic period (about 9,000–3,000 years ago). Evidence of Late Woodland Period (about 500–1000 AD) early Iroquoian occupation also exists. The first more permanent encampments by Indigenous people in the Kingston area began about 900 AD. The group that first occupied the area before the arrival of the French was probably the Wendat people (Hurons), who were later displaced by the Haudenosaunee.

At the time the French arrived in the Kingston area, Five Nations Haudenosaunee (Iroquois) had settled along the north shore of Lake Ontario. Although the area around the south end of the Cataraqui River was often visited by Haudenosaunee and other groups, Haudenosaunee settlement at this location only began after the French established their outpost. By 1700, the north shore Haudenosaunee had moved south, and the area once occupied by the Haudenosaunee (which includes Kingston) became occupied by the Mississaugas, a subtribe of the Anishinaabe, who had moved south from the Lake Huron and Lake Simcoe regions.

=== French settlement and Fort Frontenac ===
European commercial and military influence and activities centred on the fur trade developed and increased in North America in the 17th century. Fur trappers and traders were spreading out from their centres of operation in New France. French explorer Samuel de Champlain visited the Kingston area in 1615.

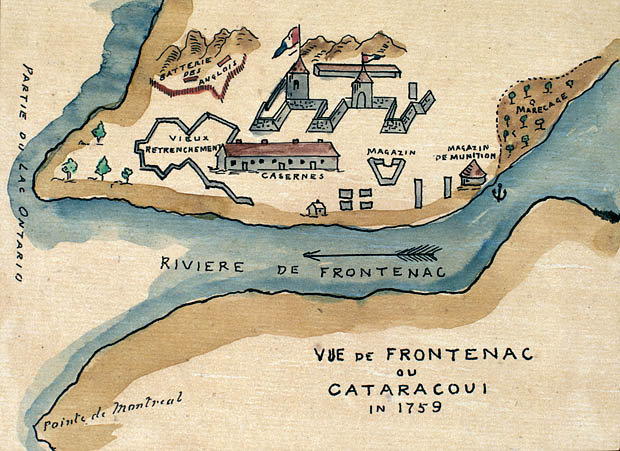
"View of Frontenac or Cataracoui in 1759". Watercolour map depicting Fort Frontenac.

To establish a presence on Lake Ontario for the purpose of controlling the fur trade with local indigenous people, Louis de Buade de Frontenac, Governor of New France, established Fort Cataraqui, later to be called Fort Frontenac, at a location known as Cataraqui in 1673. The fort served as a trading post and military base, and gradually attracted indigenous and European settlement. In 1674, René-Robert Cavelier, Sieur de La Salle was appointed commandant of the fort. From this base, de La Salle explored west and south as far as the Gulf of Mexico. The fort was rebuilt several times and experienced periods of abandonment. The Haudenosaunee siege of 1688 led to many deaths, after which the French destroyed the fort, but would rebuild it. The British destroyed the fort during the Battle of Fort Frontenac (Seven Years' War) in 1758 and its ruins remained abandoned until the British took possession and partially reconstructed it in 1783. The fort was renamed Tête-de-Pont Barracks in 1787. It was turned over to the Canadian military in 1870–71 and is still being used by the military. It was renamed Fort Frontenac in 1939. Partially reconstructed parts of the original fort can be seen today at the western end of the La Salle Causeway.

=== Loyalist settlement ===
In 1783, Frederick Haldimand, governor of the Province of Quebec directed Major Samuel Holland, Surveyor-General of Quebec, to lay out a settlement for displaced British colonists, or Loyalists, who were fleeing north because of the American Revolutionary War and "minutely examine the situation and site of the Post formerly occupied by the French, and the land and country adjacent". Haldimand had originally considered the site as a possible location to settle loyal Mohawks. The survey would also determine whether Cataraqui was suitable as a navy base since nearby Carleton Island on which a British navy base was located had been ceded to the Americans after the war. Holland's report about the old French post mentioned "every part surpassed the favorable idea I had formed of it", that it had "advantageous Situations" and that "the harbour is in every respect Good and most conveniently situated to command Lake Ontario". Major John Ross, commanding officer of the King's Royal Regiment of New York at Oswego partly rebuilt Fort Frontenac in 1783. As commander, he played a significant role in establishing the Cataraqui settlement.

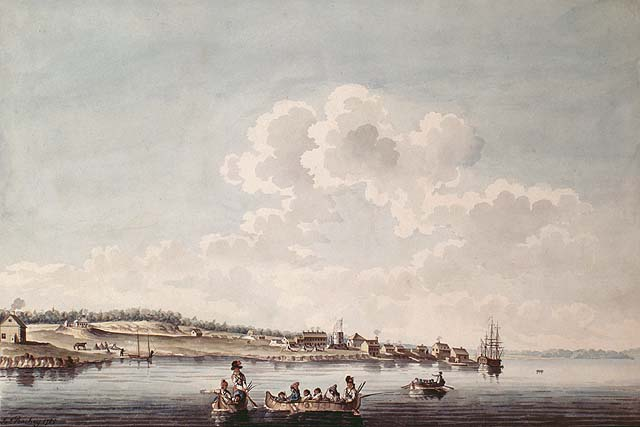
A Southeast View of Cataraqui, by James Peachey, August 1785

To facilitate settlement, the British Crown entered into an agreement with the Mississaugas in October 1783 to purchase land east of the Bay of Quinte. Known as the Crawford Purchase, this agreement enabled settlement for much of the eastern section of the north shore of Lake Ontario. With the completion of the Mississauga agreement, settlement could proceed, although the planning of the layout of the townsite had not waited for the completion of the negotiations. The area was surveyed, and the survey report mentioned the area was deemed to have productive lands, abundant resources, a good harbour and an existing townsite. These requirements were considered ideal to settle the Loyalists. Three kinds of refugee Loyalists would settle at Cataraqui: 'associated' or 'incorporated' Loyalists who were organized into companies under militia officers, provincial colonial regiments and their dependants, and unincorporated Loyalists who came to Canada independently.

Many Loyalist refugees had at first settled on Carleton Island, and operated businesses there. When the Island was ceded to the United States after the Revolutionary War, these Loyalists, along with their businesses, relocated to Cataraqui.

Notable Loyalists who settled in the Cataraqui area include Molly Brant (the sister of Six Nations leader Joseph Brant); businessman and political figure Richard Cartwright; John Stuart, a clergyman, missionary and educator who arrived in 1785; and militia captain Johan Jost Herkimer. The first name given to the settlement by the Loyalists was King's Town, which eventually developed into the current appellation. The first child born in King's Town was John Godfrey Lloyd, son of a discharged Hessian soldier from Herkimer County, New York, Johan Gottlieb Lloyd, and his wife Mary Klein. Klein was one of six daughters of John Cline, who was killed during the British-supported Seneca raids in the Mohawk Valley, New York, in May 1780. Klein was brought to Carleton Island with Molly Brant, and arrived in Cataraqui in 1783, before the influx of Loyalist settlers in 1784.

A group of Loyalists from New York State, led by Captain Michael Grass who arrived in 1784 after sailing from New York City and up the St. Lawrence River, established a camp south of Fort Frontenac at Mississauga Point.

The first high school (grammar school) in what later became the province of Ontario was established in Kingston in 1792 by Loyalist priest John Stuart, which evolved into Kingston Collegiate and Vocational Institute.

=== War of 1812, and development ===
During the War of 1812, Kingston (with a population of 2,250) was a major military centre. It was the base for the Lake Ontario division of the British naval fleet on the Great Lakes, which engaged in a vigorous arms race with the American fleet based at Sackets Harbor, New York for control of Lake Ontario. The Provincial Marine quickly placed ships into service and troops were brought in. A Royal Naval detachment built warships in order to control Lake Ontario. Fortifications and other defensive structures were built. The first Fort Henry was built during this time to protect the dockyards in Navy Bay. This fort was replaced by a more extensive fort on Point Henry in 1813. The present limestone citadel, constructed between 1832 and 1836, was intended to defend the recently completed Rideau Canal (opened in 1832) at the Lake Ontario end as well as the harbour and the naval dockyard. In 1843, the advanced battery overlooking the lake to the south was completed when the casemated commissariat stores and magazines were built. Fort Henry was garrisoned by British until 1871. It was restored starting in 1936 and is a popular tourist attraction, now part of a World Heritage Site.

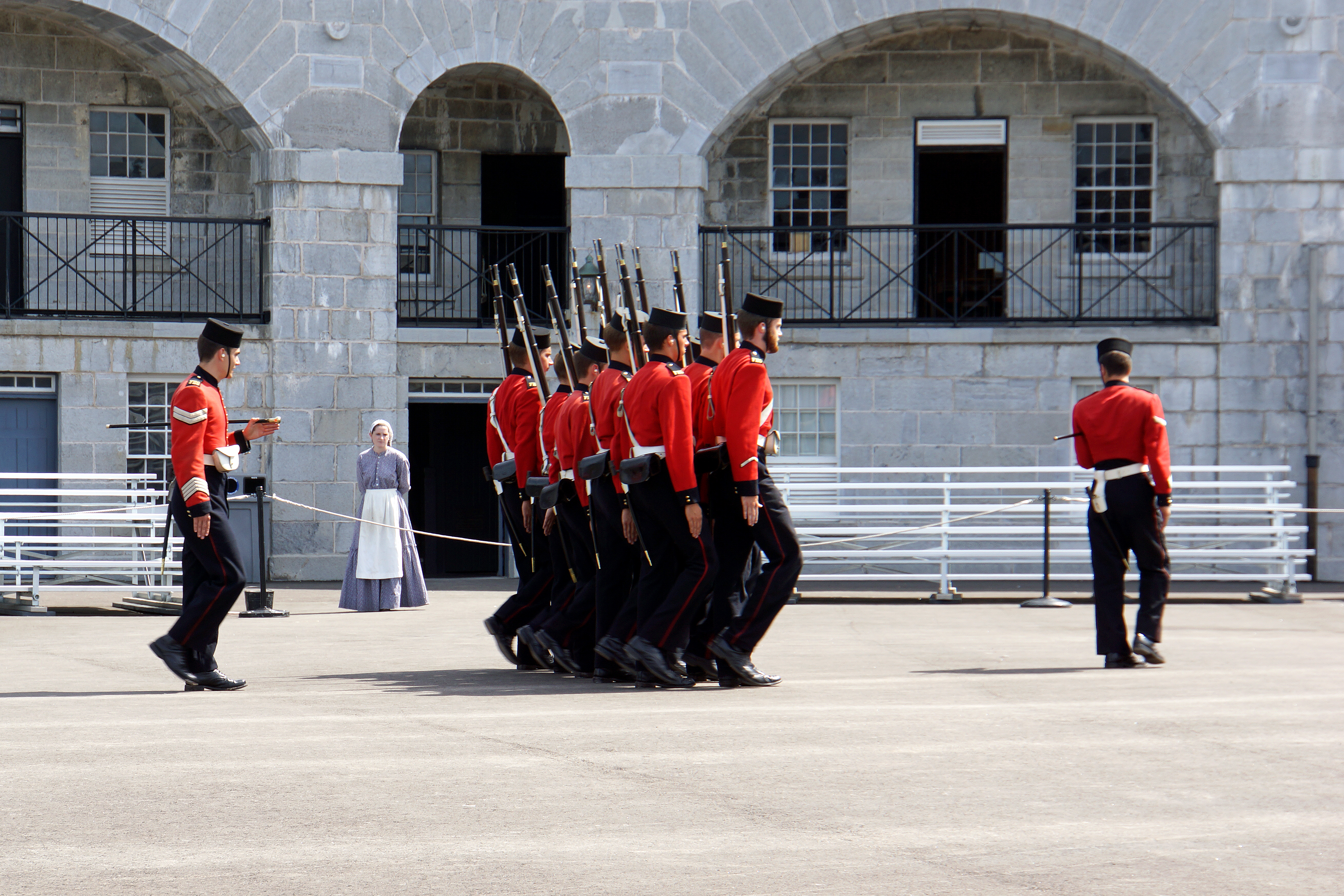
Fort Henry Guard practice drill, Fort Henry

Kingston's location at the Rideau Canal entrance to Lake Ontario made it the primary military and economic centre of Upper Canada after canal construction was completed in 1832. It was incorporated as a town in 1838; the first mayor of Kingston was Thomas Kirkpatrick. Kingston had the largest population of any centre in Upper Canada until the 1840s. Kingston was incorporated as a city in 1846.

Kingston became an important port as businesses relating to transshipment, or forwarding, grew. Since Kingston was at the junction of the St. Lawrence River and Lake Ontario, commodities shipped along the lake from the west such as wheat, flour, meat, and potash were unloaded and stored at Kingston to await transfer to vessels that could navigate the risky St. Lawrence. With the completion of the Rideau Canal, cargoes could be transported in a safer fashion since the St. Lawrence River route could be bypassed. The canal was a popular route for transporting lumber.

Regiopolis College (for training priests) was incorporated in March 1837, and in 1866 the college was given full degree-granting powers, although these were rarely used and the college closed in 1869. The building became the Hotel Dieu Hospital in 1892. The college reopened at another location in 1896. Queen's University, originally Queen's College, one of the first liberal arts universities, first held classes in March 1842; established by the Presbyterian Church, it later became a national institution. The Royal Military College of Canada (RMC) was founded in 1876.

Kingston Penitentiary, Canada's first large federal penitentiary, was established in 1835 and operated until 2013. Several more prisons would be established in later years in the greater Kingston area, including the federal Prison for Women (1930, closed in the 1990s), Millhaven Institution, Collins Bay Institution, Frontenac (which amalgamated with Collins Bay in 2013), and Joyceville Institution.

During the Upper Canada Rebellion, 1837–38, much of the local militia was posted in Kingston, under Lieutenant-colonel Richard Henry Bonnycastle who completed construction of the new Fort Henry.

=== As Canada's first capital ===
Lord Sydenham, the Governor General of Canada chose Kingston as the first capital of the united Canadas, and it served in that role from 1841 to 1844. The first meeting of the Parliament of the Province of Canada on June 13, 1841, was held on the site of what is now Kingston General Hospital. The city was considered too small and lacking in amenities, however, and its location near the border made it vulnerable to American attack. Consequently, the capital was moved to Montreal in 1844, and it alternated between Quebec City and Toronto from 1849 until Ottawa, then a small lumber village known as Bytown, was selected as the permanent capital by Queen Victoria. Subsequently, Kingston's growth slowed considerably and its national importance declined.

In 1846, with a population of 6,123, Kingston was incorporated as a city, with John Counter as the first mayor. By that time, there were stone buildings, both residential and commercial. The market house was particularly noteworthy as "the finest and most substantial building in Canada" which contained many offices, government offices, space for church services, the post office, the City Hall (completed in 1844) and more. Five weekly newspapers were being published. Fort Henry and the marine barracks took up a great deal of space. Kingston Penitentiary had about 400 inmates. (The prison opened in 1835, with a structure intended to reform the inmates, not merely to hold or punish them.) Industry included a steam grist mill, three foundries, two shipbuilders, ship repairers and five wagon makers; tradesmen of many types also worked here. All freight was shipped by boat or barges and ten steamboats per day were running to and from the town. Five schools for ladies and two for boys were operating, and the town had four bank agency offices. There were ten churches or chapels and the recently opened Hotel Dieu hospital was operated by sisters with the Religious Hospitallers of St. Joseph as a charity.

Both Hotel Dieu and Kingston General Hospital (KGH) cared for victims of the typhus epidemic of 1847. The KGH site held the remains of 1,400 Irish immigrants who had died in Kingston in fever sheds along the waterfront, during the 1847 North American typhus epidemic, while fleeing the Great Famine. They were buried in a common grave. The remains were re-interred at the city's St. Mary's Cemetery in 1966. In 1995, KGH was designated a National Historic Site of Canada, because it is "the oldest public hospital in Canada still in operation with most of its buildings intact and thus effectively illustrates the evolution of health care in Canada in the 19th and 20th centuries".

In 1848, the Kingston Gas Light Company began operation. (Gas lamps would be used until 1947.) By that time, the town was connected to the outside world by telegraph cables.

The Grand Trunk Railway arrived in Kingston in 1856, providing service to Toronto in the west, and to Montreal in the east. Its Kingston station was 3.2 km (2 mi) north of downtown. Kingston became an important rail centre, for both passengers and cargo, due to difficulty travelling by ship through the rapids-and-shoal-filled river.

By 1869, the population had increased to 15,000, and there were four banks. There were two ship building yards.

Kingston was the home of Canada's first Prime Minister, John A. Macdonald. He won his first election to Kingston City Council in 1843, and would later represent the city for nearly 50 years at the national level, both before and after Confederation in 1867. One of his residences in Kingston, Bellevue House, is now a popular National Historic Site of Canada open to the public, and depicting the house as it would have been in the 1840s when he lived there.

In the early hours of April 18, 1840, a dock fire, fanned by high winds, spread to a warehouse containing between 70 and 100 kegs of gunpowder. The resulting explosion spread the fire throughout the city's downtown area, destroying a large number of buildings, including the old city hall. To prevent similar incidents from occurring in future, the city began building with limestone or brick. This rebuilding phase was referred to as "the Limestone Revolution" and earned the city the nickname "The Limestone City".

=== 20th century ===
The Canadian Locomotive Company was in the early 20th century the largest locomotive works in the British Empire and the Davis Tannery was at one time the largest tannery in the British Empire. The tannery operated for a century and was closed in 1973. Other manufacturing companies included the Marine Railway Company, which built steamboats; the Victoria Iron Works, which produced iron in bars from scrap; several breweries; a distillery; and two soap and candle manufacturers. (By the start of the 21st century, most heavy industry would leave the city and their former sites would be gradually rehabilitated and redeveloped.)

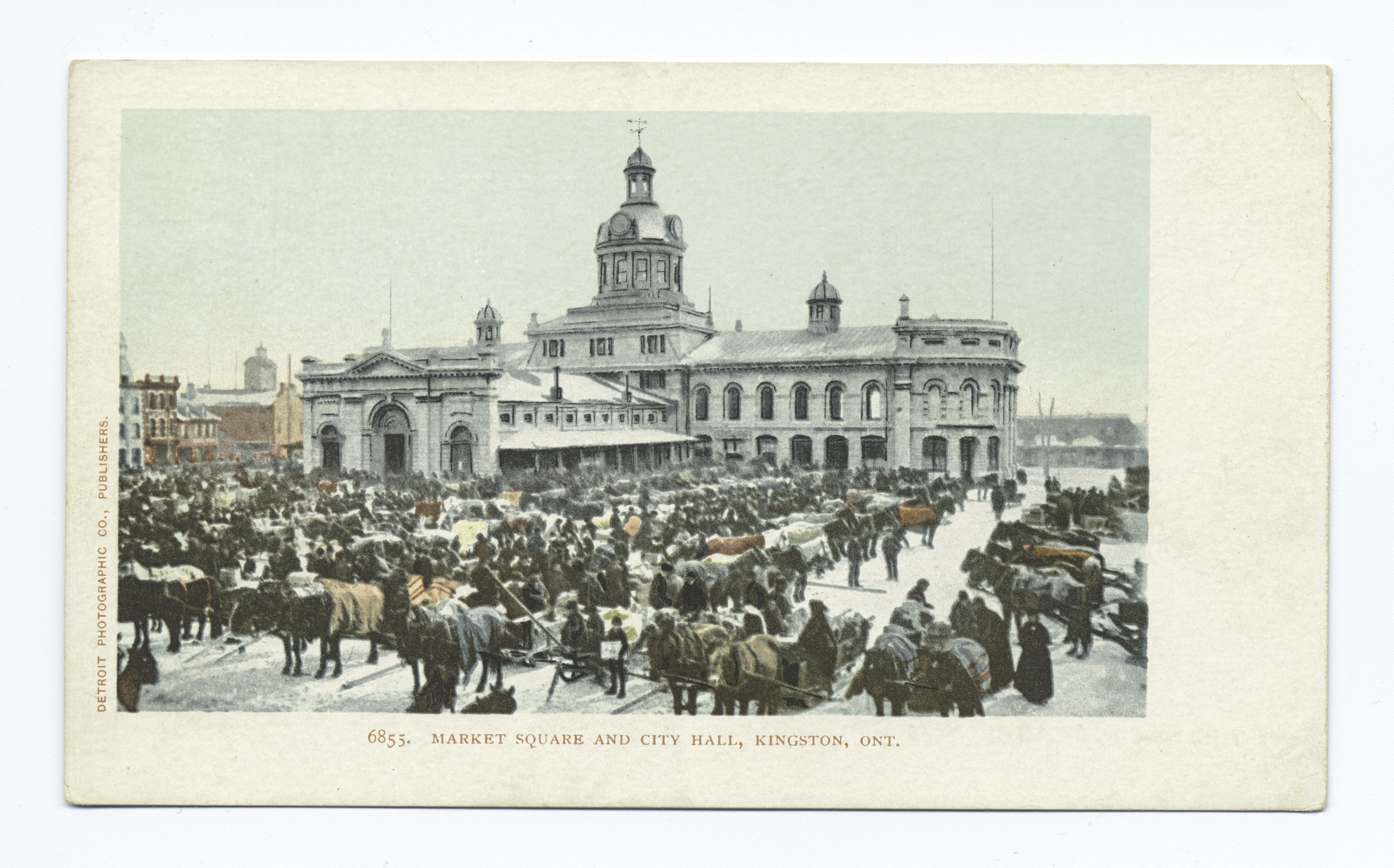
Market Square, early 20th century

A telephone system began operation in Kingston in 1881; at that time the population was 14,091. Electricity was not available in Kingston until 1888.

Kingston grew moderately through the 20th century through a series of annexations of lands in adjacent Kingston Township, including a 1952 annexation of some 5,500 acres (22 km^{2}) which encompassed areas west to the Little Cataraqui Creek (including the village of Portsmouth), where a number of large residential subdivisions were built in the late 1950s and early '60s.

Kingston's economy gradually evolved from an industrial to an institutional base after World War II. Queen's University grew from about 2,000 students in the 1940s to its present size of over 28,000 students, more than 90 per cent of whom are from outside the Kingston area. The Kingston campus of St. Lawrence College was established in 1969, and the college has 6,700 full-time students. The Royal Military College of Canada was founded in 1876, and has about 1,000 students. Kingston is a regional health care centre, anchored by Kingston General Hospital and the medical school at Queen's. The city's economy is also dominated by post-secondary education, military institutions, and prison installations.

Municipal governance had been a topic of discussion since the mid-1970s due to financial imbalance between the city and the surrounding townships, which now had large residential areas and a population approaching that of the city proper. On January 1, 1998, the city was amalgamated with Kingston Township and Pittsburgh Township to form the new City of Kingston. The city's boundaries now encompass large rural areas north of Highway 401 and east of the Cataraqui River.

=== 21st century ===
The La Salle Causeway, originally opened in 1916, included a bascule lift bridge, spanning the Cataraqui River. It was demolished by the Government of Canada after it failed in buckling due to an engineering error during 2024 refit work. The bridge has temporarily been replaced by a modular bridge.

== Military history ==
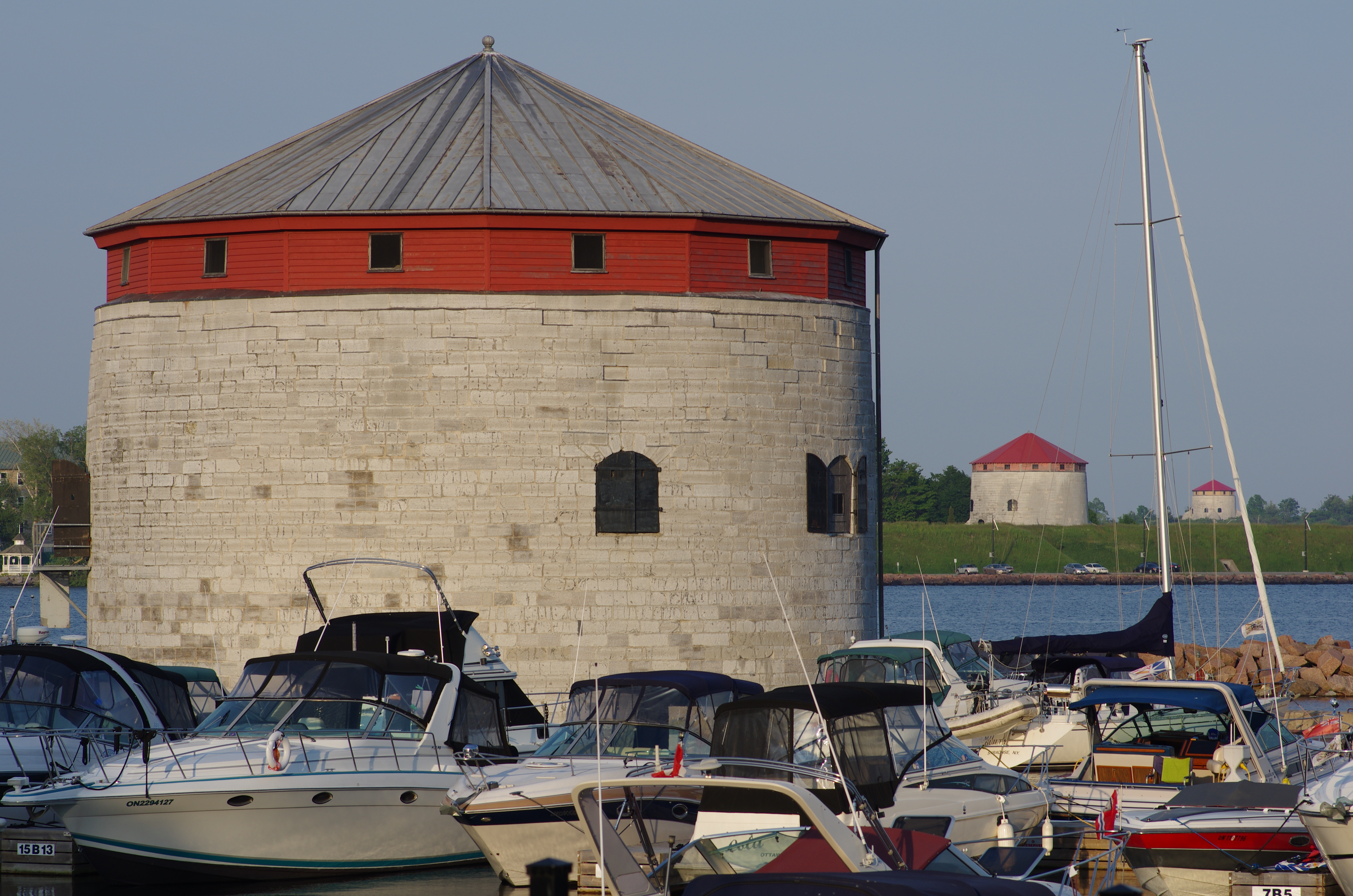
Line of defence: three Martello towers (Shoal Tower, Fort Frederick, Cathcart Tower). A fourth tower, Murney Tower, is southwest of this location.

Kingston, being strategically located at the head of the St. Lawrence River and at the mouth of the Cataraqui River near the border with the United States, has been a site of military importance since Fort Frontenac was built in 1673. The French and, later, the British established military garrisons. The War of 1812 led to the bolstering of military troops, the servicing of ships, and the building of new fortifications to defend the town and the Naval Dockyard. Forts were constructed on Point Henry and at Point Frederick. A picket wall, or stockade, incorporating five blockhouses was built to the west of the town, and batteries were constructed. In November 1812 American naval forces attacked the British sloop Royal George in Kingston harbour but the ship took refuge in the harbour and the American forces withdrew.

Several defensive fortifications were constructed in the late 1840s because of tensions with the United States. These include Fort Henry, four Martello towers (Cathcart Tower, Shoal Tower, Murney Tower, and Fort Frederick), and the Market Battery. Military ships were built at the Naval Dockyard at Point Frederick from 1788 to 1853. The peninsula near the entrance of the later Royal Military College of Canada was the headquarters of the Royal Navy in between 1813 and 1853. (Fort Frederick, built in 1812–13, was also on this peninsula.)

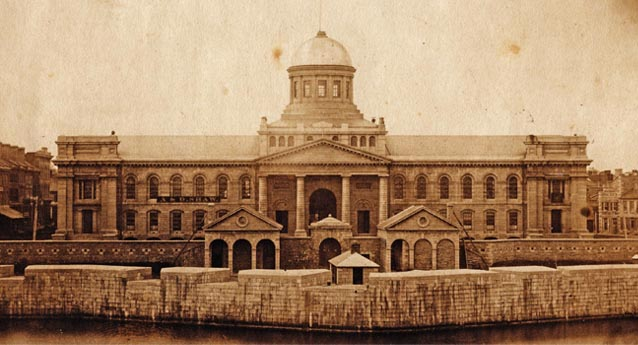
Kingston City Hall and the Market Battery, 1857

After the British army withdrew from most locations in Canada in 1870–71, two batteries of garrison artillery were formed by the Dominion Government; the "A" Battery was in Kingston at Fort Henry and Tête du Pont Barracks (Fort Frontenac). (The other battery was in Quebec City) The batteries were also schools of gunnery. Designated as the Regiment of Canadian Artillery, the regular component evolved into the Royal Canadian Horse Artillery. Most of its battery remained housed at Tête du Pont Barracks until 1939.

Following the withdrawal of British forces from Canada in 1870–71, the federal government recognized the need for an officer training college in Canada. In 1874, during the administration of Alexander Mackenzie, enabling legislation was passed. Located on Point Frederick, the site of the former Royal Naval Dockyard,

Before a formal college was established in 1876, there were proposals for military colleges in Canada. Staffed by British Regulars, students underwent a military course in 1865 at the School of Military Instruction in Kingston. The school enabled officers of militia or candidates for commission or promotion in the militia to learn military duties, drill and discipline, to command a company at Battalion Drill, to Drill a Company at Company Drill, the internal economy of a Company and the duties of a Company's Officer. The school was retained at Confederation, in 1867.

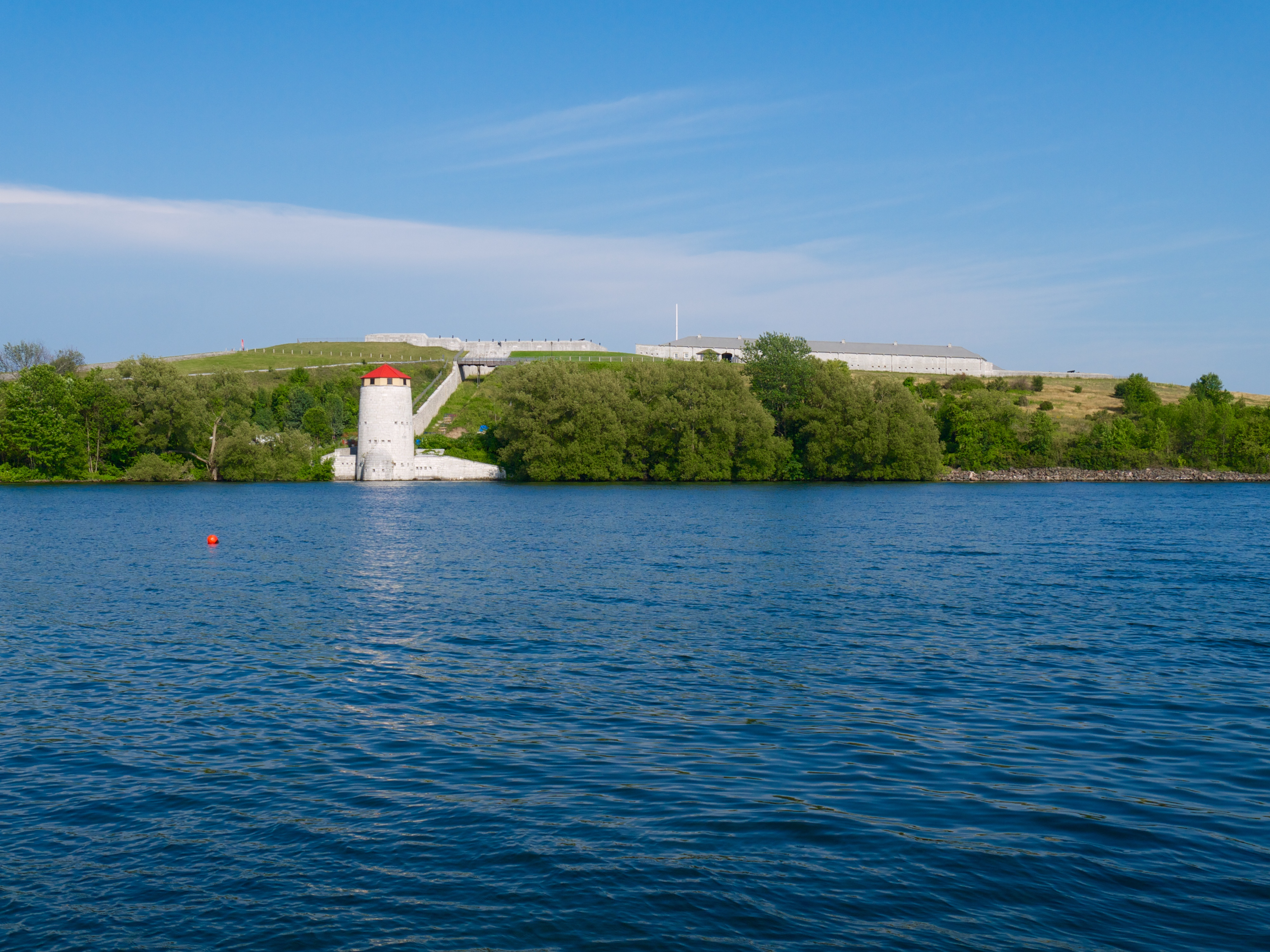
Fort Henry, 2015

The withdrawal of imperial troops required a Canadian location for the training of military officers. Because of Kingston's military tradition and the fact several military buildings already existed at the old naval dockyard, Point Frederick was chosen as the location for Canada's first military college, the Royal Military College of Canada (RMC). The facility, called simply The Military College until 1878, opened on Point Frederick with 18 students in 1876 under the first Commandant, Lieutenant-colonel Edward Osborne Hewett, of the Royal Engineers, providing cadets with academic and military training. In 1959, it became the first military college in the Commonwealth with the right to confer University degrees.

Located east of Kingston's downtown, the army's Camp Barriefield, now McNaughton Barracks, was constructed at the beginning of the First World War and expanded during the Second World War. Camp Barriefield was named in honour of Rear-Admiral Robert Barrie (May 5, 1774 – June 7, 1841), a British naval officer noted for his service in the War of 1812. It was later named McNaughton Barracks after Andrew George Latta McNaughton, a former Minister of National Defence. Nearby Vimy Barracks was established in 1937 for the Royal Canadian Corps of Signals (later the Royal Canadian School of Signals). Vimy and McNaughton Barracks house the Canadian Forces School of Communications and Electronics (CFSCE), the Canadian Armed Forces' military communications training centre and several other units. McNaughton Barracks and Vimy Barracks make up most of CFB Kingston (Canadian Forces Base Kingston). Major military facilities supported by CFB Kingston include Fort Frontenac, on the site of the original fort, and the Royal Military College of Canada.

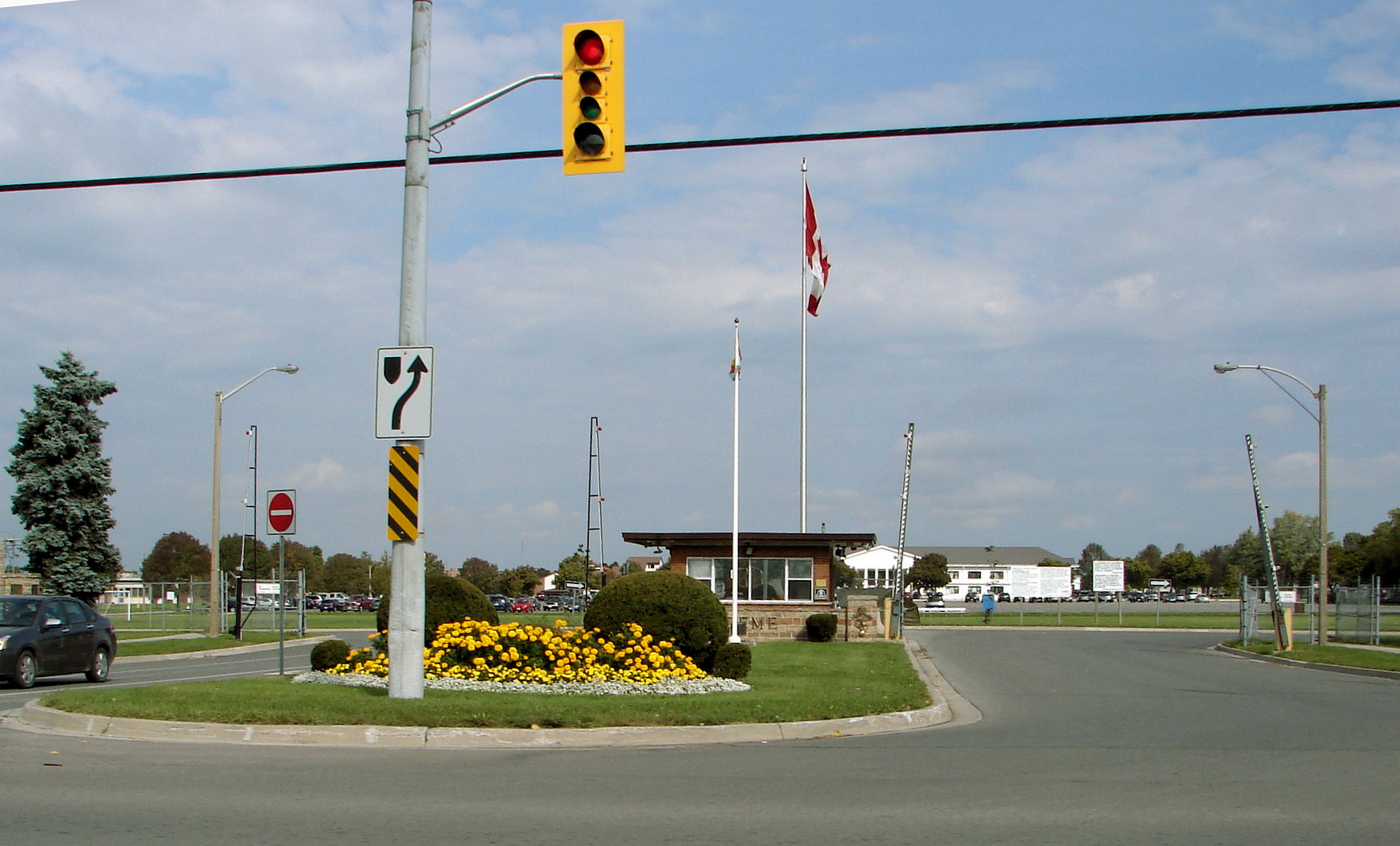
Main gate, CFB Kingston

The Princess of Wales' Own Regiment has been a fixture in the City of Kingston since 1863. The PWOR operates as a Primary Reserve Regiment, its members drawn from the Kingston and area community.

During the First World War, the 21st Battalion was formed and saw action in France in 1915 resulting in 18 battle honours including their role in the Battle of Vimy Ridge. The Royal Canadian Horse Artillery also fought in Europe with the 2nd Canadian Division, taking part in 13 major battles. Fort Henry became an internment camp for enemy aliens from August 1914 to November 1917.

During the Second World War the Stormont, Dundas and Glengarry Highlanders (SD&G), mobilized in June 1940. During fighting, troops that had formed in Kingston received recognition from the government for their achievements. Fort Henry was again an internment camp (Camp 31) from September 1939 to December 1943. A military aerodrome, RCAF Station Kingston, was constructed to the west of Kingston to support flying training as part of the British Commonwealth Air Training Plan.

== Heritage sites ==
Kingston is known for its historic properties, as reflected in the city's motto of "where history and innovation thrive". Including World Heritage Sites, National Historic Sites, Provincially Significant sites, municipally designated heritage properties, and listed or non-designated heritage properties, the city has 1,211 properties listed in the heritage register it maintains pursuant to the Ontario Heritage Act.

In 2007, the Rideau Canal, along with the fortifications at Kingston, was designated a World Heritage Site, one of only 15 such sites in Canada.

There are 21 National Historic Sites of Canada in Kingston.

== Demographics ==
Historical populations
Year	Pop.	±%
1871	12,407	—
1881	14,091	+13.6%
1891	19,263	+36.7%
1901	17,961	−6.8%
1911	18,874	+5.1%
1921	21,753	+15.3%
1931	23,439	+7.8%
1941	30,126	+28.5%
1951	33,459	+11.1%
1956	48,618	+45.3%
1961	53,526	+10.1%
1966	59,004	+10.2%
1971	59,047	+0.1%
1976	56,032	−5.1%
1981	52,616	−6.1%
1986	55,050	+4.6%
1991	56,597	+2.8%
1996	55,947	−1.1%
2001	114,195	+104.1%
2006	117,207	+2.6%
2011	123,363	+5.3%
2016	123,798	+0.4%
2021	132,485	+7.0%
Source: Statistics Canada

In the 2021 census conducted by Statistics Canada, Kingston had a population of 132,485 living in 57,836 of its 63,095 total private dwellings, a change of 7% from its 2016 population of 123,798. With a land area of 451.58 km^{2} (174.36 sq mi), it had a population density of 293.4/km^{2} (759.9/sq mi) in 2021.

At the census metropolitan area (CMA) level in the 2021 census, the Kingston CMA had a population of 172,546 living in 73,506 of its 80,955 total private dwellings, a change of 7.1% from its 2016 population of 161,175. With a land area of 1,919.17 km^{2} (741.00 sq mi), it had a population density of 89.9/km^{2} (232.9/sq mi) in 2021.

=== Ethnicity ===
In 2021, 82.4 per cent of Kingston residents were white / European, 13.4 per cent were visible minorities and 4.2 per cent were Indigenous. The largest visible minority groups were South Asian (3.4 per cent), Chinese (2.4 per cent), Black (2.0 per cent), Arab (1.2 per cent), and Latin American (1.0 per cent).

Largest ethnic origin in Kingston CMA by census tract based on the 2021 census

Ethnic and cultural origins (2021)	Population	per cent
Irish	33,410	25.9
English	32,920	25.5
Scottish	28,430	20.0
Canadian	20,990	16.3
French n.o.s	14,315	11.1
German	12,210	9.5
Caucasian (White) n.o.s+ European n.o.s	6,675	5.2
British Isles n.o.s	6,535	5.1
Dutch	6,395	5.0
Italian	4,630	3.6
First Nations (North American Indian) n.o.s.+ North American Indigenous, n.o.s.	3,825	3.0
Polish	3,550	2.7
Chinese	3,155	2.4
Welsh	3,025	2.3
Note: a person may report more than one ethnic origin.

Panethnic groups in the City of Kingston (2001–2021)
Panethnic group	2021		2016		2011		2006		2001	
Panethnic group	Pop.	%	Pop.	%	Pop.	%	Pop.	%	Pop.	%
European (Note: Statistic includes all persons that did not make up part of a visible minority or an indigenous identity.)	106,315	82.34%	104,340	86.79%	106,660	89.68%	103,540	90.78%	103,030	92.75%
Indigenous	5,470	4.24%	4,220	3.51%	3,485	2.93%	2,360	2.07%	1,765	1.59%
South Asian	4,430	3.43%	2,395	1.99%	1,995	1.68%	1,720	1.51%	1,430	1.29%
East Asian (Note: Statistic includes total responses of "Chinese", "Korean", and "Japanese" under visible minority section on census.)	3,990	3.09%	3,250	2.7%	2,505	2.11%	2,920	2.56%	2,035	1.83%
African	2,600	2.01%	1,750	1.46%	1,105	0.93%	1,030	0.9%	685	0.62%
Middle Eastern (Note: Statistic includes total responses of "West Asian" and "Arab" under visible minority section on census.)	2,300	1.78%	1,480	1.23%	1,065	0.9%	645	0.57%	530	0.48%
Southeast Asian (Note: Statistic includes total responses of "Filipino" and "Southeast Asian" under visible minority section on census.)	1,860	1.44%	1,300	1.08%	1,035	0.87%	755	0.66%	755	0.68%
Latin American	1,270	0.98%	885	0.74%	805	0.68%	710	0.62%	595	0.54%
Other (Note: Statistic includes total responses of "Visible minority, n.i.e." and "Multiple visible minorities" under visible minority section on census.)	875	0.68%	590	0.49%	280	0.24%	360	0.32%	265	0.24%
Total responses	129,115	97.46%	120,215	97.11%	118,930	96.41%	114,050	97.31%	111,085	97.28%
Total population	132,485	100%	123,798	100%	123,363	100%	117,207	100%	114,195	100%

- Note: Totals greater than 100 per cent due to multiple origin responses.

=== Mother tongue ===
2021 Canadian census: English – 82.86%, French – 3.12%, Mandarin – 1.25%, Portuguese – 1.12%, Punjabi – 1.2%, Arabic – 0.94%.

=== Religion ===
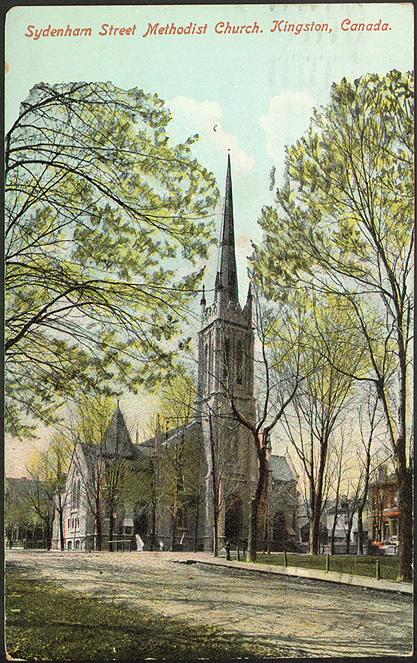
Sydenham Street Methodist Church in 1910. It was built in 1852 and later expanded.

In 2021, 65,490 Kingston residents, or about half of the population, were members of Christian groups; the largest were Roman Catholics, who numbered 30,385 (23.5 per cent), the United Church of Canada (8,575 or 6.6 per cent), and the Anglican Church of Canada (8,600 or 6.7 per cent).

The Presbyterian Church was particularly influential in the 19th-century development of Kingston post-secondary education. The church was a founder and financial supporter of Queen's University until 1912 when it was agreed the university should become a secular institution. John A. Macdonald was also a member of St. Andrew's Presbyterian Church in Kingston.

The religious history of the city can still be seen in the monumental stone churches throughout the downtown core, some of which now serve as community and co-working spaces. Newer churches in the city, like Reunion Kingston, tend to seek rental options rather than build new physical spaces.

Groups other than Christians and the non-religious include Muslims (3,375 or 2.6 per cent), Hindus (1,670 or 1.3 per cent), and Jews (875 or 0.7 per cent). The city's oldest synagogue, Beth Israel Congregation, was founded in 1908 and has been on Centre Street, near Queen's University, since 1961. 55,355 people, or 42.9 per cent of the population, identified as non-religious.

== Government ==
=== Municipal ===
For its municipal government, the city is divided into 12 wards; each elects one councillor. All voters in the city cast ballots for the mayor, currently Bryan Paterson, an economics professor at the Royal Military College of Canada. Paterson was re-elected in the 2022 Ontario municipal elections for the 2022–2026 term.

The councillors elected for the same term were:

- Gary Oosterhof – Countryside District (acclaimed)
- Paul Chaves – Loyalist-Cataraqui District
- Lisa Osanic – Collins-Bayridge District
- Wendy Stephen – Lakeside District
- Don Amos – Portsmouth District
- Jamshed (Jimmy) Hassan – Trillium District
- Brandon Tozzo – Kingscourt-Rideau District
- Jeff McLaren – Meadowbrook-Strathcona District
- Vincent Cinanni – Williamsville District
- Conny Glenn – Sydenham District
- Gregory Ridge – King's Town District
- Ryan Boehme – Pittsburgh District

A referendum held as part of the 2018 municipal on adoption of ranked voting received support from a majority of respondents (62.9%). While the municipality began work towards implement ranked voting for the 2022 election, city councils in Ontario were banned from using ranked choice ballots by the Supporting Ontario's Recovery and Municipal Elections Act, 2020.

=== Provincial ===
Kingston federal election results
Year	Liberal		Conservative		New Democratic		Green	
2021	41%	28,490	24%	17,137	29%	20,416	2%	1,729
2019	45%	32,033	20%	14,488	23%	16,414	9%	6,223

Kingston provincial election results
Year	PC		New Democratic		Liberal		Green	
2025	22%	12,022	12%	6,663	62%	33,288	2%	1,195
2022	26%	13,002	31%	15,675	36%	18,499	3%	1,769
2018	27%	15,687	39%	22,867	27%	15,605	6%	3,801

In provincial elections, the city consists of two ridings. Most of the city is Kingston and the Islands, formed after the 1999 redistribution, incorporating half of the former Frontenac-Addington and most of the former Kingston and the Islands riding. A small portion north of Highway 401 is in Lanark—Frontenac—Kingston which was created in 2015.

Party	Member of Provincial Parliament	From	To	Riding
Liberal	Ted Hsu	June 2, 2022	present	Kingston and the Islands
Progressive Conservative	John Jordan	June 2, 2022	present	Lanark—Frontenac—Kingston

=== Federal ===
Kingston is part of two federal ridings. Most of the city is in Kingston and the Islands, created in 1966 from Kingston and parts of Hastings—Frontenac—Lennox and Addington and Prince Edward—Lennox. A small portion north of Highway 401 is in Lanark—Frontenac, which was created by the 2012 Canadian federal electoral redistribution and was legally defined in the 2013 representation order. It came into effect upon the call of the 42nd Canadian federal election on October 19, 2015.

Party	Members of Parliament	From	To	Riding
Liberal	Mark Gerretsen	October 19, 2015	present	Kingston and the Islands
Conservative	Scott Reid	October 21, 2019	present	Lanark—Frontenac

== Economy ==
Kingston's economy relies heavily on public sector institutions and establishments. The most important sectors are related to health care, higher education (Queen's University, the Royal Military College of Canada, and St. Lawrence College), government (including the military and correctional services), tourism and culture. Manufacturing, and research and development play a smaller role than in the past. The private sector accounts for half of Kingston's employment. One of Kingston's major industrial employers of the 20th century, the Canadian Locomotive Company, closed in 1969, and the former Alcan and DuPont operations employ far fewer people than in the past. But due to the city's central location between Toronto, Ottawa, Montreal and Syracuse, NY a trucking and logistics warehousing industry has developed.

According to the Kingston Economic Development Corporation, the major employers in Kingston as of October 2023 were:

- Queen's University, 9,352
- Canadian Forces Base Kingston, 8,500
- Kingston Health Sciences Centre, 5,953
- Limestone District School Board, 3,400
- Correctional Service of Canada, 2,500
- Providence Care, 1,700
- City of Kingston, 1,550
- St. Lawrence College, 875
- Invista Canada, 700
- Empire Life Insurance, 674
- Ontario Ministry of Health, 530
- J. E. Agnew Food Services (operates several Tim Hortons stores), 450
- Calian Technologies, 363
- Novelis (formerly Alcan), 285
- Tim Hortons Distribution Centre, 280
- Commissionaires Canada, 255
- Cancoil Thermal Corporation, 200
- Assurant, 180
- Canada Royal Milk, 165
- Haakon Industries, 160
- DuPont, 150
- Frulact, 95
- Kingston Process Metallurgy, 90
- Coca-Cola Bottling, 85
- MetalCraft Marine, 70
- PepsiCo Beverages Canada, 45

=== Tourism ===
According to Statistics Canada, the tourism industry in Kingston represents a vital part of the city's economy. In 2004, over 3,500 jobs were contributed to Kingston's economy due to the tourism industry. The tourism industry has been at a healthy growth rate and has become one of the most performing sectors of Kingston. Unique opportunities are presented for this industry in this time of shifting travel trends and the baby boomer generation. The success of Kingston's tourism industry is heavily dependent on information about travellers; however, data availability still remains a challenge.

Kingston has launched several tourism campaigns including Downtown Kingston! and Yellow Door. The city launched a campaign to attract more traffic to downtown Kingston. The campaign's mission statement promises, "to promote downtown Kingston as the vibrant and healthy commercial, retail, residential, and entertainment centre of our region, attracting more people to live, shop, work and gather". The downtown area of Kingston is known as the central business district, and is the gathering place for various events including the Kingston Buskers Rendezvous, FebFest, and the 1000 Islands Poker Run.

Alternatively, Yellow Door promotes tourism to the entire city. The goal of the campaign is to increase the consumer's exposure to Kingston tourism, while remaining financially reasonable. A yellow door was used as a metaphor for Kingston – and the good times people have – and used street workers to gather potential tourists from nearby Toronto and Ottawa. "Yellow Door" promotes interest by offering potential tourists a trip to Kingston. In 2013, Yellow Door received the Tourism Advertising Award of Excellence for the marketing and promotion of an Ontario tourism product.

=== Attractions ===
Tripadvisor users rate the following among the best attractions in and near the city: Canada's Penitentiary Museum, Fort Henry (Fort Henry National Historic Site), Wolfe Island (via ferry), Bellevue House National Historic Site, the Great Lakes Museum, City Hall and the downtown waterfront nearby. Ontario Travel's recommendations include cruising the Thousand Islands, The Grand Theatre and Slush Puppie Place.

== Coat of arms ==
Coat of arms of Kingston, Ontario
Crest Rising above barry wavy of three Argent Azure and Argent a rock proper thereon a beaver statant Or; Escutcheon Gules a Martello tower Argent upon barry wavy of five Argent and Azure in chief three Eastern crowns Or; Supporters Dexter a griffin sinister a lion Or each gorged with a collar of maple leaves Gules; Motto 'Antiquitate Civilitate Humanitate'

== Transportation ==
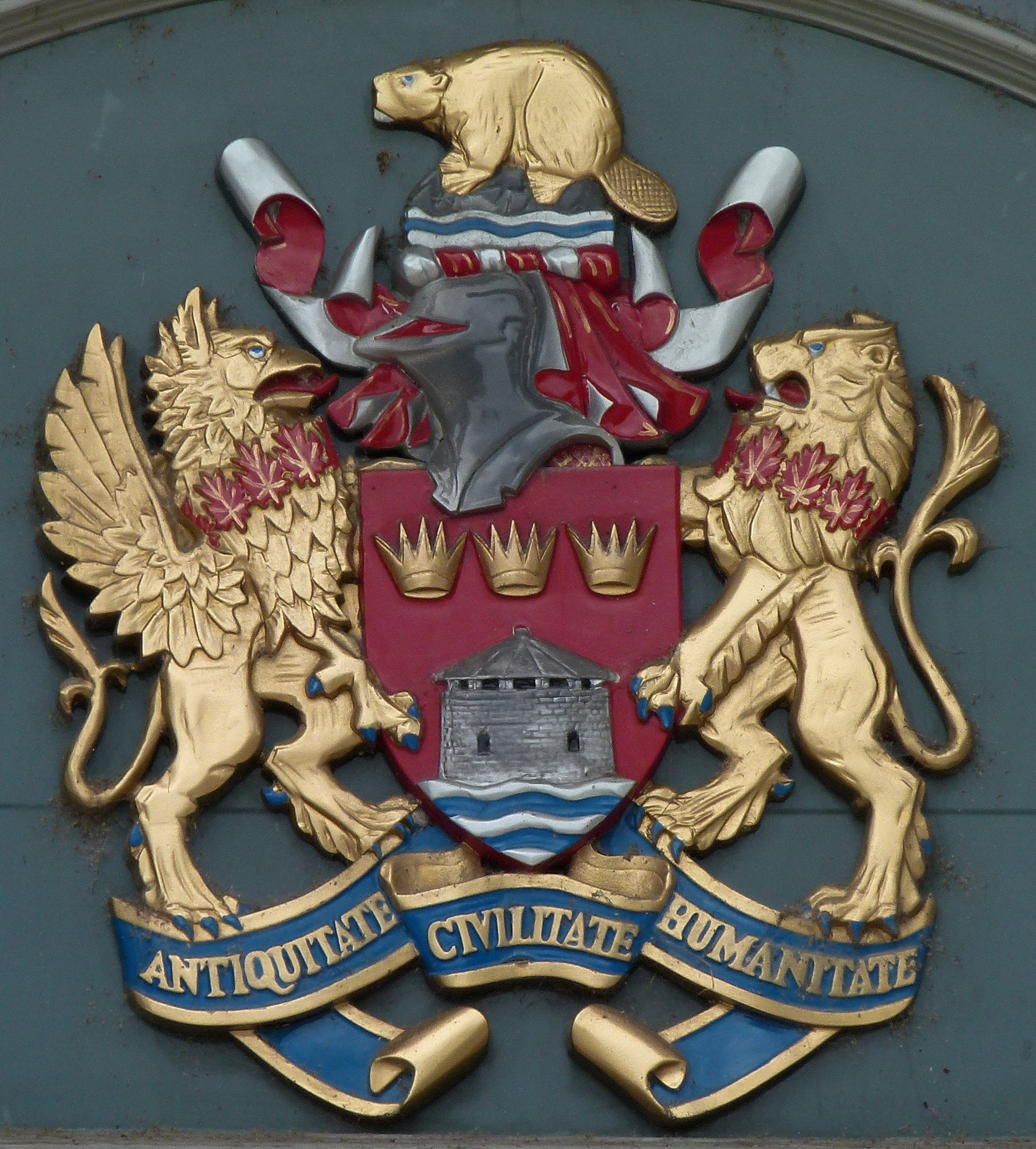
Coat of Arms

Highway 401 is the principal access route into Kingston and runs across the northern section of the urbanized portion of the city. The first sections of the highway in the Kingston area were opened in 1958, although it was not fully completed for another ten years. In addition to the 401, the Waaban Crossing and the La Salle Causeway are bridge crossings of the Cataraqui River. Highway 15 is an alternative route between Kingston and the Ottawa region. From the south, Interstate 81 connects with Highway 401 at the Thousand Islands Border Crossing east of Kingston.

=== Ferry service ===
Regular ferry service, using the Wolfe Islander IV operated by the Ontario Ministry of Transportation. sails between downtown Kingston and Wolfe Island. Seasonal ferry service from Cape Vincent, New York, via Wolfe Island, into downtown Kingston is an alternate route to and from the United States. There are also tourist ferries departing downtown Kingston regularly, although with greater frequency in the summer months.

=== Via Rail ===
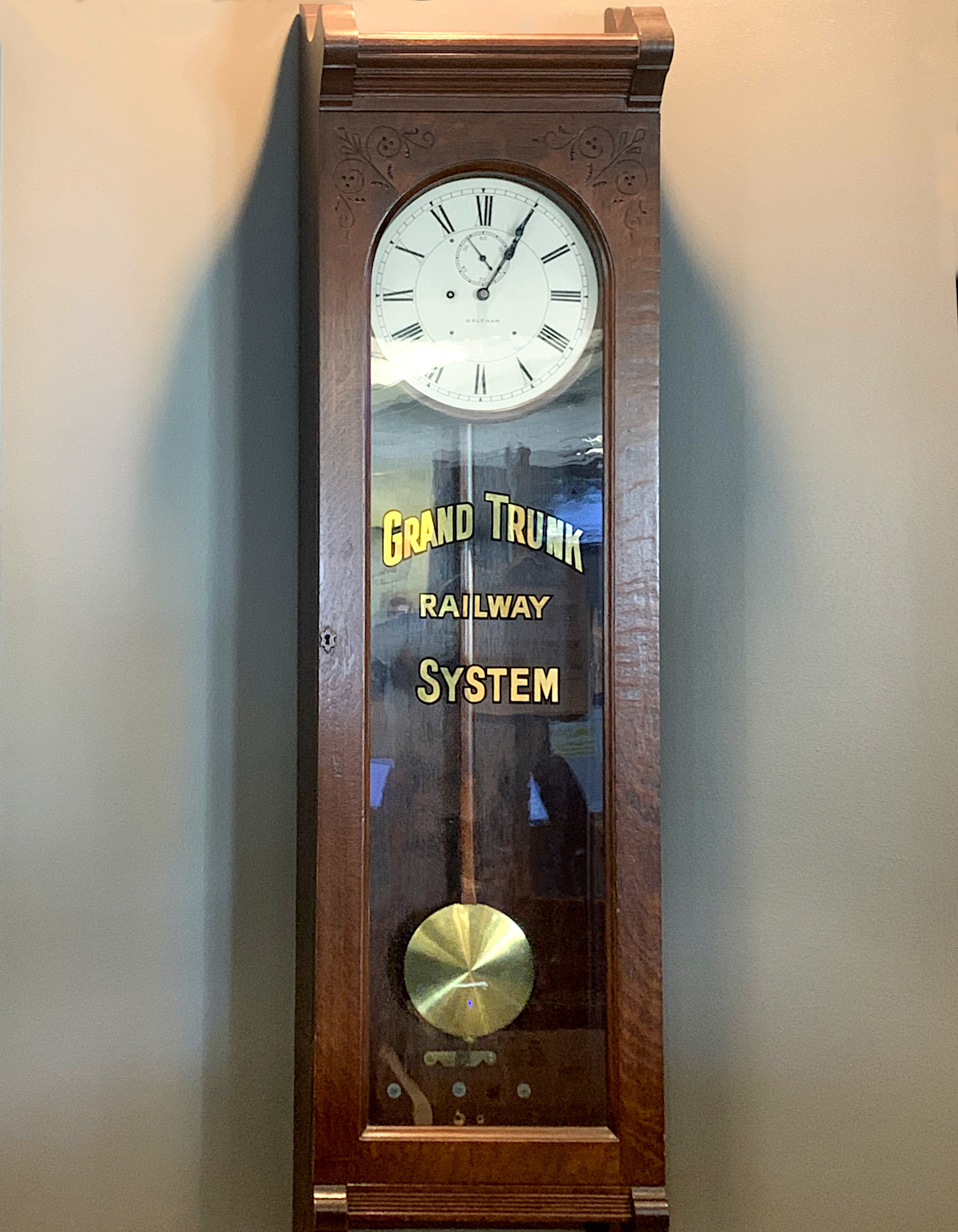
Antique railway clock from the Grand Trunk Railway in the railway station in Kingston

Via Rail's Corridor service connects Kingston station along the main line between Windsor, Ontario and Quebec City, and to Ottawa. Its current station was built in 1974, relocated from the original station site 2 km (1.2 mi) further east. Kingston is a regular stop on train services operating between Toronto and Ottawa and between Toronto and Montreal.

=== Airport ===
On June 30, 2020, Air Canada announced its intention to cease operations at Kingston Norman Rogers Airport. Air Canada said the timing of the suspensions and shutdowns would be governed by requirements for regulatory notice.

In March 2022, Pascan Aviation started regular passenger service between Kingston and Montréal–Trudeau International Airport. However, Pascan Aviation announced that they would pausing their service from Kingston Airport starting in January 2023 for an undetermined amount of time, which meant that the city would be without any passenger air service for the time being.

=== Intercity buses ===
Megabus (Coach Canada) provides frequent service from their Kingston Bus Terminal and Queen's University to a range of destinations in Ontario and Quebec. Passengers can book direct buses to Toronto's Union Station Bus Terminal, Toronto Pearson Airport, Toronto-Yorkdale, Montreal, Ottawa, Mississauga, Brockville, Cornwall, Kirkland, and Whitby.

In 2021, Rider Express began to serve Kingston along its Toronto-Ottawa Route providing Kingston with direct bus service to Toronto, Ottawa, Scarborough, and Belleville. Passengers depart and arrive at the Rider Express's Kingston Bus Stop located at 1185 Division St. at Esso Gas Station by the McDonald's.

In 2022, FlixBus began to serve Kingston along its Windsor-Ottawa Route. This provides passengers bus services from Kingston to Toronto, Ottawa, Hamilton, London, Windsor, Scarborough, Whitby–Oshawa, and Chatham-Kent. Passengers depart and arrive at Flixbus's Kingston Bus Stop located at 275 Wellington Street in downtown Kingston.

In 2022, Red Arrow bus company included Kingston on a route between Toronto and Ottawa.

Shuttle Kingston was reported in 2013 to connect to Watertown and Syracuse.

=== Public transportation ===
Kingston Transit is the organization that handles the local public transportation system within Kingston. The organization runs over 20 bus routes throughout Kingston with additional routes being added on a seasonal basis to support the needs of the student population in Kingston. The organization charges a standard fare of $3.50 for riders over the age of 15 and provides free service to those under the age of 15.

Kingston Access Services provides accessible municipal bus service to residents who cannot use Kingston Transit due to disability. In 2017, Kingston Access Services celebrated its 50th anniversary as Ontario's oldest accessible transit service having been established originally as the "Kingston Bus for the Handicapped" in 1967.

=== Taxi services ===
Two taxi services operate in the city: Amey's Taxi and Modern City Taxi Cab Limited. Additionally, Uber also provides service to customers in the city and is licensed and regulated by Kingston Area Taxi Commission. The Uber cars that operate in Kingston are UberX, Uber Comfort, and Uber Green. In October 2022, Kingston ranked 4th on Uber's "Nightlife Index" due to the high volume of rides between 10pm and 2am within the city.

== Culture ==
Kingston hosts several festivals during the year, including the Kingston WritersFest, Limestone City Blues Festival (ended 2023), the Kingston Canadian Film Festival, Artfest, Spring Reverb, the Kingston Buskers Rendezvous, Kingston Jazz Festival, the Reelout Queer Film Festival, Feb Fest, the Wolfe Island Music Festival, the Skeleton Park Arts Festival, Kingston Pride, Día de los Muertos Kingston Festival, and The Kick & Push Festival.

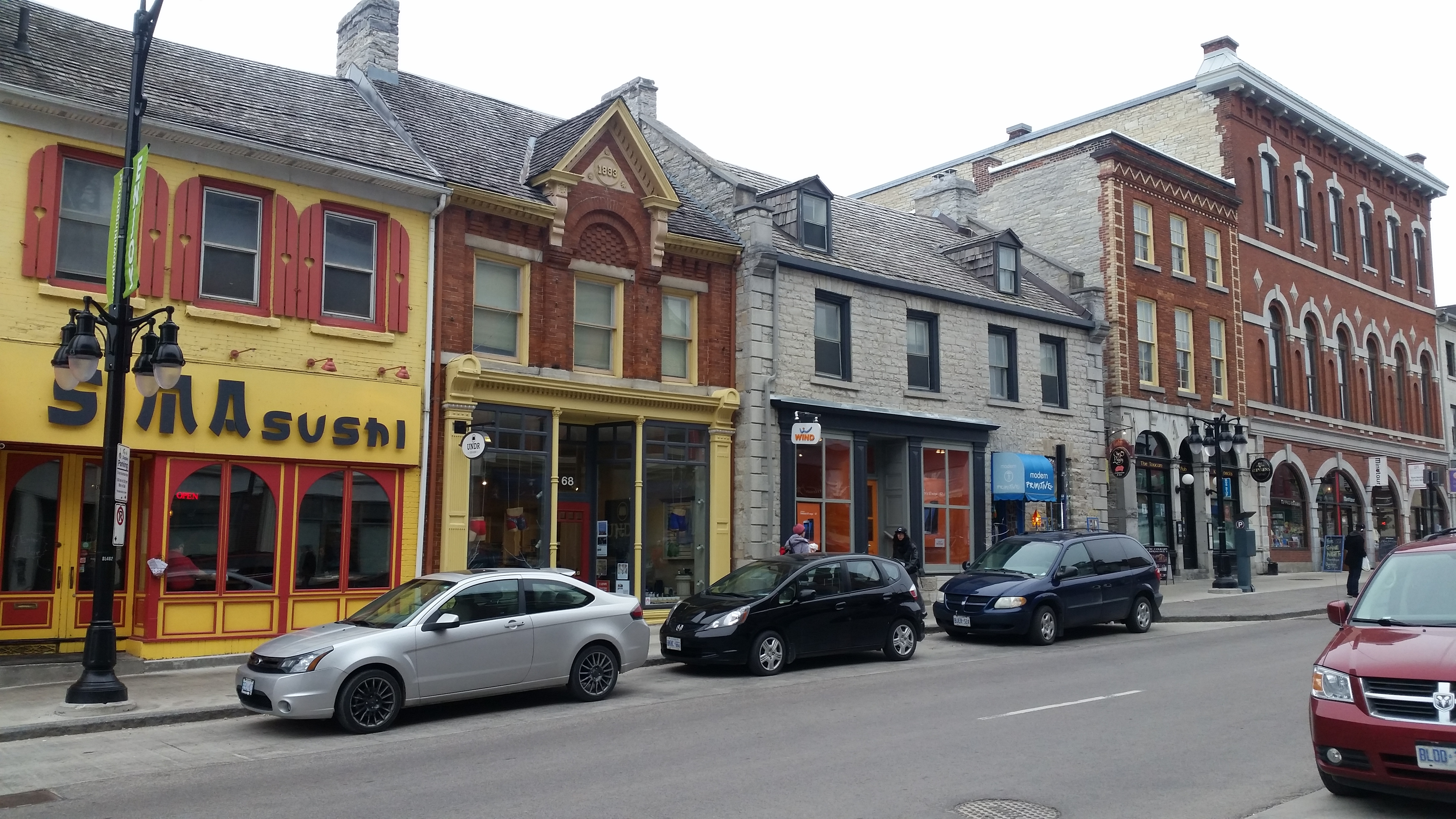
Architecture of Princess Street in March 2016

Kingston is home to many artists who work in visual arts, media arts, literature, and a growing number who work in other time-based disciplines such as performance art. The contemporary arts scene in particular has two long standing professional non-profit venues in the downtown area, the Agnes Etherington Art Centre (founded 1957), and Modern Fuel Artist-Run Centre (founded 1977). Local artists often participate in the exhibition programming of each organization, while each also presents the work of artists from across Canada and around the world – in keeping with their educational mandates. Alternative venues for the presentation of exhibition programs in Kingston include the Union Gallery (Queen's University's student art gallery), Verb Gallery, Open Studio 22, the Kingston Arts Council gallery, The Artel: Arts Accommodations and Venue, and the Tett Centre for Creativity and Learning.

The Kingston WritersFest occurred annually until 2024. In 2025, the festival was discontinued due to financial challenges. Circle of Wellness hosts Día de los Muertos Kingston Festival which occurs annually on the first Sunday of November. For over four decades the Ukrainian Canadian Club of Kingston has hosted the "Lviv, Ukraine" pavilion as part of the Folklore tradition, holding this popular cultural and folk festival annually on the second full weekend in June (at Regiopolis-Notre Dame High School). Literary events also happen throughout the year at the Kingston Frontenac Public Library and local bookstores. Writers who are or have been residents of Kingston include Steven Heighton, Bronwen Wallace, Helen Humphreys, Michael Ondaatje, Diane Schoemperlen, Michael Crummey, Mark Sinnett, Mary Alice Downie, Robertson Davies, Wayne Grady, Merilyn Simonds, Alec Ross, Jamie Swift and Carolyn Smart.

Music and theatre venues include the Isabel Bader Centre for the Performing Arts, The Grand Theatre, and The Wellington Street Theatre, which host performances from international, national, and local groups like Domino Theatre, Theatre Kingston, The Vagabond Repertory Theatre Company, Hope Theatre Projects, Bottle Tree Productions, and other small groups dot the downtown area. The Kick & Push Festival was founded in 2015 to increase summer theatre programming downtown. The Kingston Symphony performs at The Grand Theatre, as do several amateur and semi-professional theatre groups. Slush Puppie Place (renamed from K-Rock Centre and Leon's Centre) a 5,800-seat entertainment venue and ice rink, opened in February 2008.

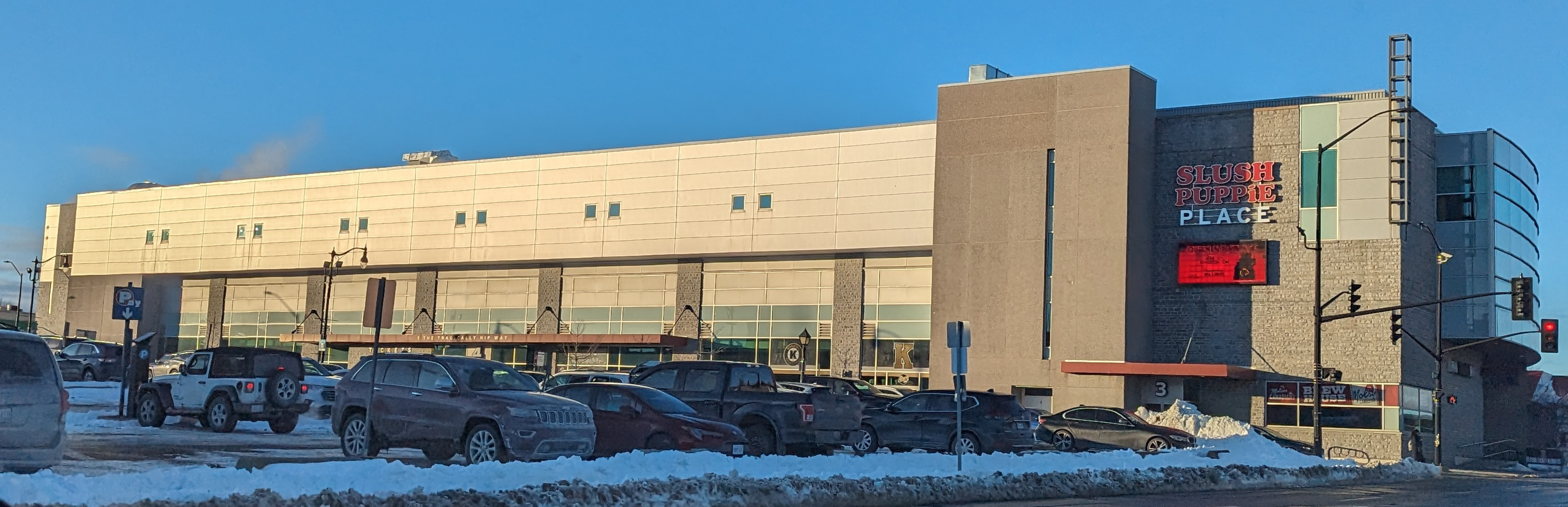
Slush Puppie Place

The city has spawned several musicians and musical groups, most of whom are known mainly within Canada, but a few of whom have achieved international success. These include The Tragically Hip, The Abrams, The Glorious Sons, The Mahones, jazz singer Andy Poole, Bedouin Soundclash, Sarah Harmer, The Arrogant Worms, The Headstones, The Inbreds, The Meringues, PS I Love You and members of Moist, including singer David Usher.

Kingston is also the birthplace of Bryan Adams. The first winner of the television series Canadian Idol was Kingston native Ryan Malcolm.

Poet Michael Andre was raised in Kingston. Zal Yanovsky of The Lovin' Spoonful lived in Kingston until his death in 2002.

Comedian and actor Dan Aykroyd has a residence just north of Kingston and is a frequent face in town. He was briefly a minor partner in a restaurant called Aykroyd's Ghetto House Café on upper Princess Street during the 1990s which prominently featured a Blues Brothers' car projecting out from the second story wall.

== Education ==
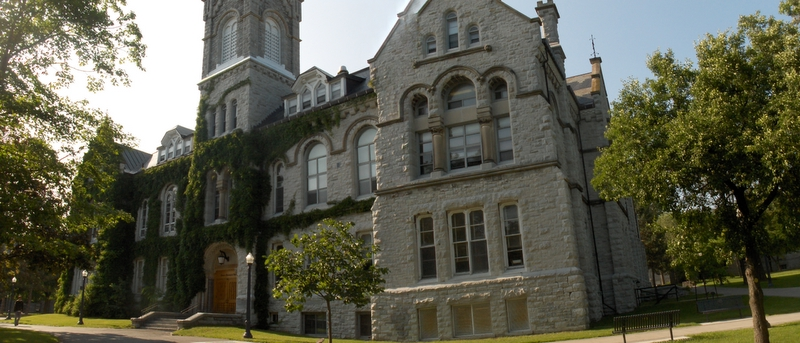
Theological Hall at Queen's University

Kingston is the site of two universities, Queen's University and the Royal Military College of Canada, and a community college, St. Lawrence College. According to Statistics Canada, Kingston has the most PhD holders per capita of any city in Canada.

=== Queen's University ===
Queen's University is one of Ontario's oldest universities and offers a variety of degree programs. The university was founded in 1841 under a royal charter from Queen Victoria. It has an enrolment of over 31,000 students. Queen's Main Campus is rather self-contained, but is within close walking distance of downtown Kingston, making it a pedestrian-friendly university for students and faculty alike.

=== Royal Military College of Canada ===
The Royal Military College of Canada, established in 1876, is Canada's only military university (Collège Militaire Royal in Saint-Jean-sur-Richelieu, Quebec, is a military college), providing academic and leadership training to officer cadets, other members of Canada's armed forces and civilians. There are 1,100 undergraduate students and 500 full- and part-time graduate students.

=== St. Lawrence College ===
St. Lawrence College offers baccalaureate degree programs at its Kingston campus in behavioural psychology, industrial trades, microelectronics, nursing, and business administration (the latter via a partnership with Laurentian University), in addition to certificate, diploma, and advanced diploma programs.

=== Primary and secondary education ===
The Limestone District School Board serves students in the City of Kingston and the counties of Frontenac and Lennox and Addington. Along with the Limestone School of Community Education, which provides adult education and training programs, approximately 21,000 students attend 70 elementary and secondary schools along with supporting education centres. The Algonquin and Lakeshore Catholic District School Board serves students of the Roman Catholic faith. Approximately 12,800 students attend 36 elementary schools and five secondary schools in this district. The Catholic high schools in the immediate Kingston area include Regiopolis Notre-Dame and Holy Cross Catholic High School. The francophone community is served by two school boards, the Conseil des écoles publiques de l'Est de l'Ontario and the Conseil des écoles catholiques du Centre-Est, each providing one secondary school in the area.

Secondary schools in Kingston:

- Bayridge Secondary School
- École secondaire catholique Sainte-Marie-Rivier
- École secondaire publique Mille-Îles
- Frontenac Secondary School
- Holy Cross Catholic Secondary School
- Kingston Secondary School
- La Salle Secondary School
- Leahurst College High School
- Loyalist Collegiate and Vocational Institute
- Regiopolis-Notre Dame Catholic Secondary School

== Correctional institutions and facilities ==
Kingston has the largest concentration of federal correctional facilities in Canada. The facilities are operated by the Correctional Service of Canada. Of the nine institutions in the Kingston area, seven are within the city's municipal boundaries.

- Kingston Penitentiary (maximum security) (Officially closed September 30, 2013).

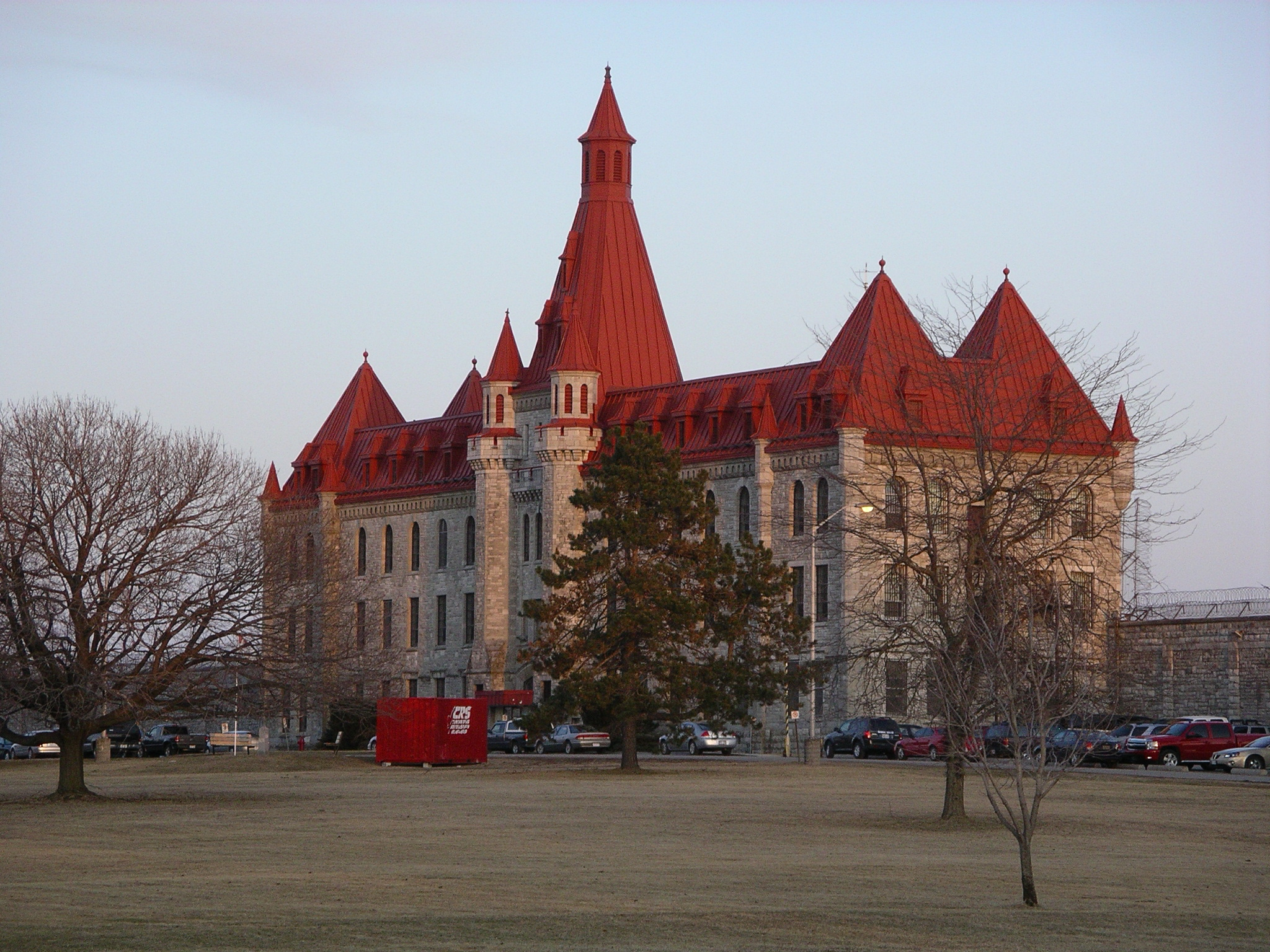
Collins Bay Institution

- Regional Treatment Centre (multi-level security), co-located within Kingston Penitentiary
- Joyceville Institution (medium security)
- Pittsburgh Institution (minimum security), co-located with Joyceville
- Collins Bay Institution (medium security)
- Frontenac Institution (minimum security), co-located with Collins Bay

Until 2000, Canada's only federal correctional facility for women, the Prison for Women (nicknamed "P4W") was also in Kingston. As a result of the report of the Commission of Inquiry into Certain Events at the Prison for Women in Kingston, the facility was closed in 2000. Queen's University purchased the property with the intention of renovating it to house the Queen's Archives, but the interior of the building was awarded a heritage designation; Queen's found the required upgrades difficult to finance. In 2018, Queen's University sold the property to Siderius Developments, which in 2024 divided it into blocks to begin residential development.

In September 2013, after almost 180 years of housing prisoners, Kingston Penitentiary closed. The maximum security prison was named a National Historic Site of Canada in February 1990 due to its history and reputation. In its early years, the prison had a vital role in constructing the city. The prison brought prosperity to Kingston, and along with eight other prisons being built in the area, helped create an impressive local economy.

== Geography and climate ==
Kingston is within the Mixedwood Plains Ecozone, and is dominated in the Kingston area by a mixture of deciduous and coniferous tree species and abundant water resources. The region is underlain mostly by Ordovician limestone of the Black River Group.

Being within hardiness zone 5, Kingston has a moderate humid continental climate (Köppen climate classification Dfb). It has cooler summers and colder winters than most of Southern Ontario. Although proximity to Lake Ontario has a moderating effect on the climate, it also tempers the heat and can on occasion increase precipitation, especially during heavy snowfall events. Mild to strong breezes blowing off Lake Ontario make Kingston one of the most consistently windy cities in Canada, especially near the water. As a result of the moderation the all-time high is a relatively modest 35.6 °C (96.1 °F) recorded on July 9, 1936.

However, due to the humidity, the humidex values on such hot days is normally very high. The coldest temperature ever recorded in Kingston was −35.6 °C (−32.1 °F) on February 17, 1896.

The central part of the city is between the Cataraqui River to the east and the Little Cataraqui Creek to the west, with outlying areas extending in both directions. The eastern part of the city is accessible by the La Salle Causeway on Highway 2.

Major features of Kingston's waterfront include Flora MacDonald Confederation Basin, Portsmouth Olympic Harbour, Collins Bay, Wolfe Island, Garden Island, the Cataraqui River (including the Inner Harbour and, within that, Anglin Bay).

Climate data for Kingston / Kingston A, & Kingston Pumping Station (precipitation) WMO ID: 71820; coordinates 44°13′24″N 76°35′58″W; elevation: 93 m (305 ft) and Climate ID: 6104146; coordinates 44°13′07″N 76°35′48″W; elevation: 92.4 m (303 ft); 1991–2020 normals and Climate ID: 6104175; coordinates 44°14′38″N 76°28′50″W; elevation: 76.5 m (251 ft); 1981-2010 normals, extremes 1872–present (Note: Extreme high and low temperatures in the table below were recorded at Queen's University from July 1872 to March 1957, at Kingston (Ontario Hydro) from April 1957 to June 1967, at Kingston Pumping Station from October 1996 to November 2007 and at Kingston Norman Rogers Airport from May 1967 to present)
Month	Jan	Feb	Mar	Apr	May	Jun	Jul	Aug	Sep	Oct	Nov	Dec	Year
Record high humidex	14.7	14.4	23.8	32.6	37.9	41.3	43.8	44.7	40.7	33.5	22.7	18.1	44.7
Record high °C (°F)	13.5 (56.3)	14.4 (57.9)	21.2 (70.2)	30.7 (87.3)	31.7 (89.1)	31.8 (89.2)	35.6 (96.1)	33.9 (93.0)	30.8 (87.4)	26.1 (79.0)	20.6 (69.1)	14.2 (57.6)	35.6 (96.1)
Mean daily maximum °C (°F)	−2.6 (27.3)	−1.8 (28.8)	3.2 (37.8)	10.0 (50.0)	17.6 (63.7)	22.1 (71.8)	25.4 (77.7)	24.6 (76.3)	20.5 (68.9)	13.8 (56.8)	7.5 (45.5)	1.6 (34.9)	11.8 (53.2)
Daily mean °C (°F)	−7.0 (19.4)	−6.4 (20.5)	−1.1 (30.0)	5.4 (41.7)	12.4 (54.3)	17.3 (63.1)	20.8 (69.4)	20.0 (68.0)	15.6 (60.1)	9.5 (49.1)	3.5 (38.3)	−2.2 (28.0)	7.3 (45.1)
Mean daily minimum °C (°F)	−11.5 (11.3)	−10.9 (12.4)	−5.5 (22.1)	0.9 (33.6)	7.3 (45.1)	12.5 (54.5)	16.1 (61.0)	15.3 (59.5)	10.7 (51.3)	5.1 (41.2)	−0.6 (30.9)	−6.0 (21.2)	2.8 (37.0)
Record low °C (°F)	−34.5 (−30.1)	−35.6 (−32.1)	−25.9 (−14.6)	−13.3 (8.1)	−4.0 (24.8)	0.6 (33.1)	6.0 (42.8)	3.9 (39.0)	−1.3 (29.7)	−7.5 (18.5)	−17.2 (1.0)	−30.5 (−22.9)	−35.6 (−32.1)
Record low wind chill	−45.1	−43.3	−37.3	−22.8	−8.5	0.0	0.0	0.0	−4.6	−12.9	−24.6	−42.4	−45.1
Average precipitation mm (inches)	82.1 (3.23)	65.9 (2.59)	64.6 (2.54)	78.1 (3.07)	78.4 (3.09)	73.0 (2.87)	64.3 (2.53)	78.7 (3.10)	95.4 (3.76)	90.4 (3.56)	98.1 (3.86)	82.5 (3.25)	951.4 (37.46)
Average rainfall mm (inches)	32.7 (1.29)	30.2 (1.19)	40.0 (1.57)	71.3 (2.81)	78.4 (3.09)	73.0 (2.87)	64.3 (2.53)	78.7 (3.10)	95.4 (3.76)	90.0 (3.54)	88.0 (3.46)	49.6 (1.95)	791.6 (31.17)
Average snowfall cm (inches)	49.5 (19.5)	35.7 (14.1)	24.5 (9.6)	6.8 (2.7)	0.0 (0.0)	0.0 (0.0)	0.0 (0.0)	0.0 (0.0)	0.0 (0.0)	0.4 (0.2)	10.1 (4.0)	32.9 (13.0)	159.9 (63.0)
Average precipitation days (≥ 0.2 mm)	15.8	13.0	12.3	12.9	13.7	12.1	10.8	11.2	11.6	13.0	14.8	14.6	155.7
Average rainy days (≥ 0.2 mm)	6.0	5.1	7.9	11.4	13.7	12.1	10.8	11.2	11.6	13.0	12.6	8.0	123.5
Average snowy days (≥ 0.2 cm)	11.6	9.3	6.4	2.2	0.0	0.0	0.0	0.0	0.0	0.19	3.4	8.2	41.2
Average relative humidity (%) (at 1500 LST)	70.1	67.4	63.7	62.4	63.4	67.3	65.7	64.9	65.9	66.6	68.9	71.8	66.5
Mean monthly sunshine hours	95.3	119.0	140.8	176.5	222.1	243.5	280.4	241.9	162.9	146.3	88.0	75.2	1,991.9
Percentage possible sunshine	33.1	40.4	38.2	43.8	48.6	52.5	59.7	55.7	43.3	42.8	30.4	27.1	43.0
Source: Environment and Climate Change Canada, (July maximum), (February minimum), (1981-2010 precipitation), (1991-2020 temperature and humidity), (1971-2000 sun)

== Sports ==
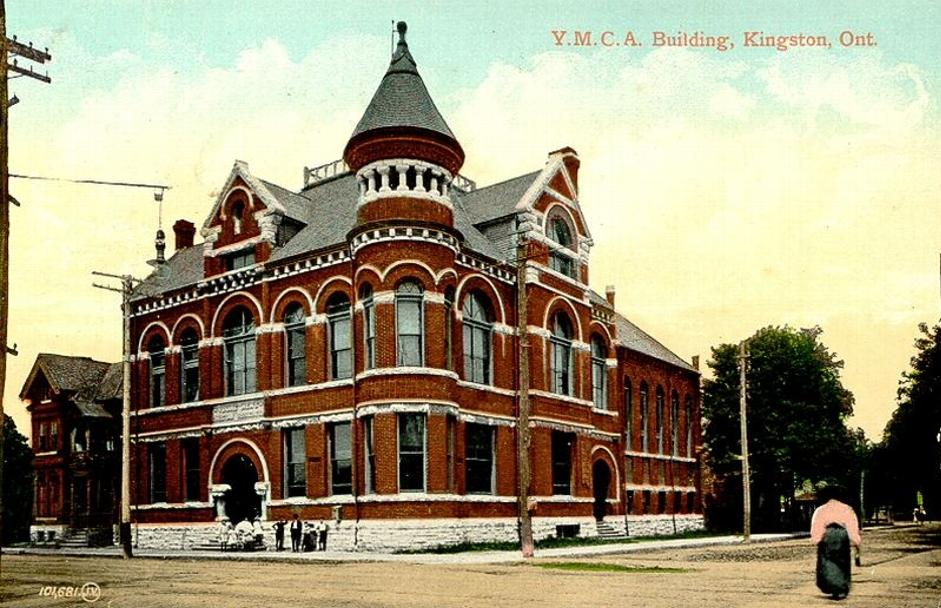
Postcard of the Y.M.C.A. Building in Kingston c. 1908

=== Hockey ===
Kingston lays claim to being the birthplace of ice hockey, though this is contested. Support for this is found in a journal entry of a British Army officer in Kingston in 1843. He wrote "Began to skate this year, improved quickly and had great fun at hockey on the ice." Kingston is also home to the oldest continuing hockey rivalry in the world by virtue of a game played in 1886 on the frozen Kingston harbour between Queen's University and the Royal Military College of Canada. To mark this event, the city hosts an annual game between the two institutions, played on a cleared patch of frozen lake with both teams wearing period-correct uniforms and using rules from that era. The two schools also contest the annual Carr-Harris Cup, named for Lorne Carr-Harris, under modern competitive conditions to commemorate and continue their rivalry.

The Memorial Cup, which serves as the annual championship event for the Canadian Hockey League, began in 1919 on the initiative of Kingstonian James T. Sutherland. The first championship was held in Kingston. Sutherland, a member of the Hockey Hall of Fame, also helped establish the annual exhibition game between the Royal Military College of Canada and the United States Military Academy (West Point) in 1923.

Kingston is represented in the Ontario Hockey League (OHL) by the Kingston Frontenacs. Kingston had a team in the Ontario Junior Hockey League (OJHL), the Kingston Voyageurs but ceased after the 2018–19 season.

The Original Hockey Hall of Fame, formerly the International Hockey Hall of Fame, was established in September 1943 with a building constructed in 1965. The original building was near the Kingston Memorial Centre (which was opened in 1950), but has since been relocated to Kingston's west end at the Invista Centre. The International Hockey Hall of Fame, founded by the National Hockey League (NHL) and the Canadian Amateur Hockey Association, is the oldest sports hall of fame in Canada. The museum's collection is home to various items that pay homage to Kingston's role in the history of hockey in Canada. These include: the original square hockey puck from the first Queens University vs. the Royal Military College of Canada (RMC) game in 1886, hockey's oldest sweater worn by a Queen's student in 1894, and Canada's first Olympic gold medal from 1924, among others.

Slush Puppie Place, in the downtown core, opened in February 2008, and serves as home ice for the Frontenacs. The Voyageurs played at the Invista Centre in the city's west end. The arena is now home to the Kingston Wranglers of the United States Premier Hockey League.

=== Sailing ===
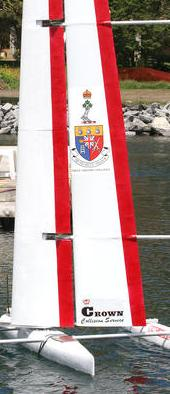
Royal Military College of Canada robotic sailboat

The city is known for its fresh-water sailing, and hosted the sailing events for the 1976 Summer Olympics. CORK – Canadian Olympic-training Regatta, Kingston – now hosted by CORK/Sail Kingston is still held every August. Since 1972, Kingston has hosted more than 40 World and Olympic sailing championships. Kingston is listed by a panel of experts among the best yacht racing venues in the US, even though Kingston is in Canada.

Kingston sits amid cruising and boating territory, with easy access to Lake Ontario, the St. Lawrence River, and the Thousand Islands National Park, formerly the St. Lawrence Islands National Park.

Kingston is also home to the youth sail training ship called the St. Lawrence II.

During the summers, the RMC campus in Kingston plays host to a Royal Canadian Sea Cadets camp called HMCS Ontario, which provides sail training along with much other training to youth from across Canada. The Kingston Yacht Club in downtown Kingston has a learn to sail program for both children and adults.

=== Diving ===
Kingston is known for fresh-water wreck diving. Kingston's shipwrecks are well preserved by its cool, fresh water, and the recent zebra mussel invasion has caused a dramatic improvement in water clarity that has enhanced the quality of diving in the area.

=== Lawn bowling ===
The Kingston Lawn Bowling Club has been at its location on Napier Street since 1932, although the sport's beginnings in Kingston have been traced back to 1914. While the club offers a variety of recreational opportunities, a number of its members have gone on to compete successfully at the provincial level and beyond. Most notable of these was Dick Edney, who was inducted into the Kingston and District Sports Hall of Fame in 2005.

=== Golf ===
The Kingston area has eight golf courses, two of which are entirely public. The Kingston Golf Club, established in 1884, was a founding member of the Royal Canadian Golf Association in 1895; however, this club ceased operating in the mid-1920s. The first winner of the Canadian Amateur Championship that same year was Kingstonian Thomas Harley, a Scottish immigrant carpenter. Richard H. (Dick) Green, who immigrated to the area from England in the late 1920s, was the longtime club professional for nearly 40 years at Cataraqui Golf and Country Club (founded in 1917 and redesigned by Stanley Thompson in 1930). Green also helped design several courses in eastern Ontario, including Smiths Falls (1949), Glen Lawrence (1955), Rideau Lakes (1961), Amherstview (1971), Garrison (1971), Evergreen (1972), Belle Park Fairways (1975), Rivendell (1979), and Colonnade (1984). Matt McQuillan, a professional player on the PGA Tour for the 2011 and 2012 seasons, was born and raised in Kingston, and developed his game at the Garrison Golf and Curling Club. McQuillan won the 2005 Telus Edmonton Open on the PGA Tour Canada.

=== Curling ===
Three curling clubs are in the Kingston area: the Cataraqui Golf & Country Club, Garrison Golf & Curling Club, and the Royal Kingston Curling Club. The Royal Kingston Curling Club (RKCC) was founded in 1820, and was granted Royal patronage in 1993. In 2006, the RKCC moved to a new facility at 130 Days Road, to make way for the construction of a new complex at Queen's University, the Queen's Centre.

Kingston has a history of hosting major curling competitions. In 2020, Kingston hosted the Tim Hortons Brier, the national men's curling championship. Kingston previously hosted the Brier in 1957. In 2013, Kingston hosted the Scotties Tournament of Hearts, the national women's curling championship.

=== Rugby ===
The Kingston Panthers Rugby Football Club (KPRFC) was founded in 1959, and from that moment onward has established a reputation as a strong community player. KPRFC is a non-profit organization answering directly to the Eastern Ontario Rugby Union (EORU), the Rugby Ontario (ORU), and Rugby Canada (RC). The Kingston Panthers R.F.C., recently celebrated their fortieth anniversary with an EORU championship in the Division 1 championship game at Twin Elm Rugby Park in Ottawa, Ontario.

=== Football ===
The earliest known incarnation of an organized football team in Kingston is the Kingston Granites which played in the predecessor league to the Canadian Football League, the Ontario Rugby Football Union, (ORFU). The team played for four seasons between 1898 and 1901 winning 1 ORFU title in 1899 defeating the Ottawa Rough Riders 8–0. Kingston also hosted the 10th Grey Cup on December 2, 1922. The Limestone Grenadiers now represent Kingston and the surrounding area in the Ontario Varsity Football League. The Club franchise catchment area draws players from Frontenac, Hastings, Lanark, Leeds, Lennox and Prince Edward counties. League play runs from late May through August. The Junior and Varsity teams' main schedule pits the Grenadiers against eastern Ontario opponents and cross-over games with western Ontario teams leading to a provincial title championship game.

=== Volleyball ===
The Kingston Volleyball Club (KVC) was founded in 2015. It is a non-profit organization, a member of the Ontario Volleyball Association (OVA), Volleyball Canada (VC). The club relies on fundraising in order to operate.

=== Soccer ===
Kingston had a soccer presence in 2011 when Kingston FC represented the city in the Canadian Soccer League's second division. In 2012, the club was promoted to the league's first division and competed in the league until 2015. Their greatest success occurred in 2013, when the club won the divisional title and finished as runners-up in the playoff championship final.

After Kingston left the CSL, the city was represented in League1 Ontario by Kingston Clippers with both a men's and women's side. The Clippers played their final season in the league in 2016.

In 2025, it was announced that the Kingston Sentinels would begin play in League2 Ontario, the province's third division, in the 2026 season, representing the return of semi-professional soccer to the city.

== See also ==
- Belle Island
- Cartwright Point, Ontario
- Inner Harbour, Kingston
- Sydenham Ward
- Kingston Mills
- Rideau Heights, Kingston
- Royal eponyms in Canada
- HMCS Kingston (MM 700)
