= Kingston, Ontario Inner Harbour =

Harbour in Canada

Coordinates: 44.2363°N 76.4738°W

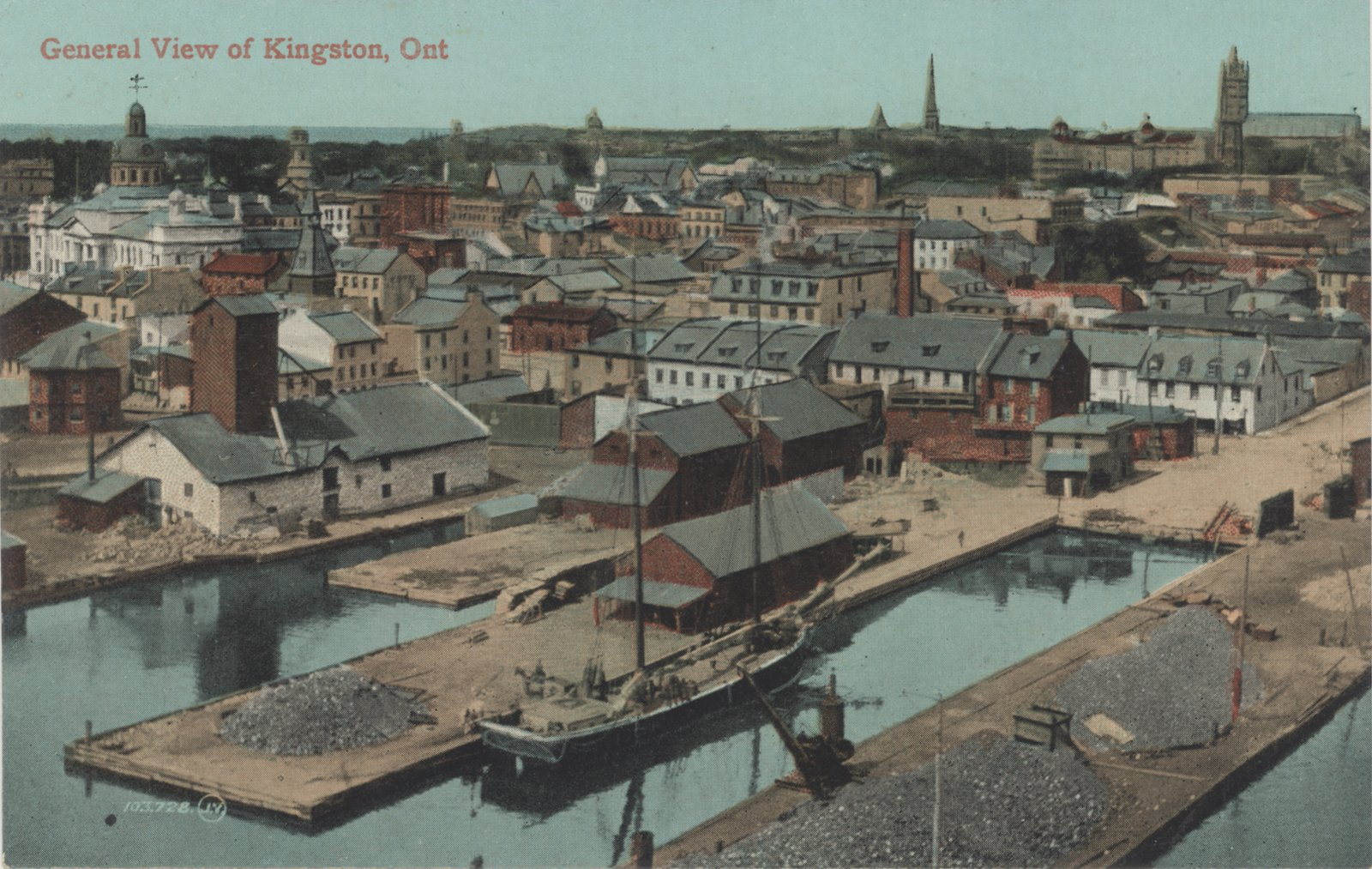
Postcard of the waterfront of Kingston, Ontario, Canada

The Kingston, Ontario Inner Harbour is situated at the south end of the Cataraqui River northeast of the downtown core of Kingston, Ontario, Canada. It is the section of Kingston Harbour that is north of the La Salle Causeway.
