= La Salle Causeway =

Causeway in Kingston, Ontario

Coordinates: 44°14′04.8″N 76°28′28.5″W

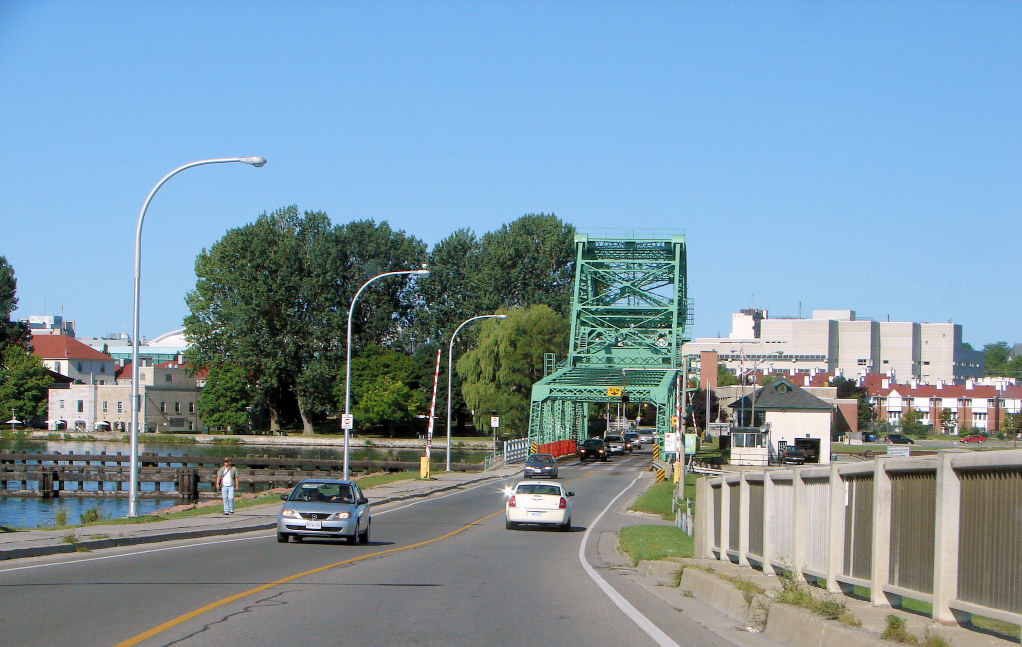
The causeway and lift bridge, looking west.

The La Salle Causeway, also called the LaSalle Causeway, is a causeway located in Kingston, Ontario. It allows Highway 2 to cross the Cataraqui River (the southern entrance of the Rideau Canal). The causeway separates Kingston's inner and outer harbours. Construction of the causeway was completed on April 15, 1917. The causeway transports approximately 23,000 vehicles daily.

Three bridges are incorporated into the causeway, the centre one being a Strauss trunnion bascule lift bridge, which was designed by Joseph Strauss, who designed the Golden Gate Bridge in San Francisco.

The La Salle Causeway was named after René-Robert Cavelier, Sieur de La Salle. who oversaw the construction of Fort Frontenac in 1673 at what is now the western end of the causeway.

== History ==
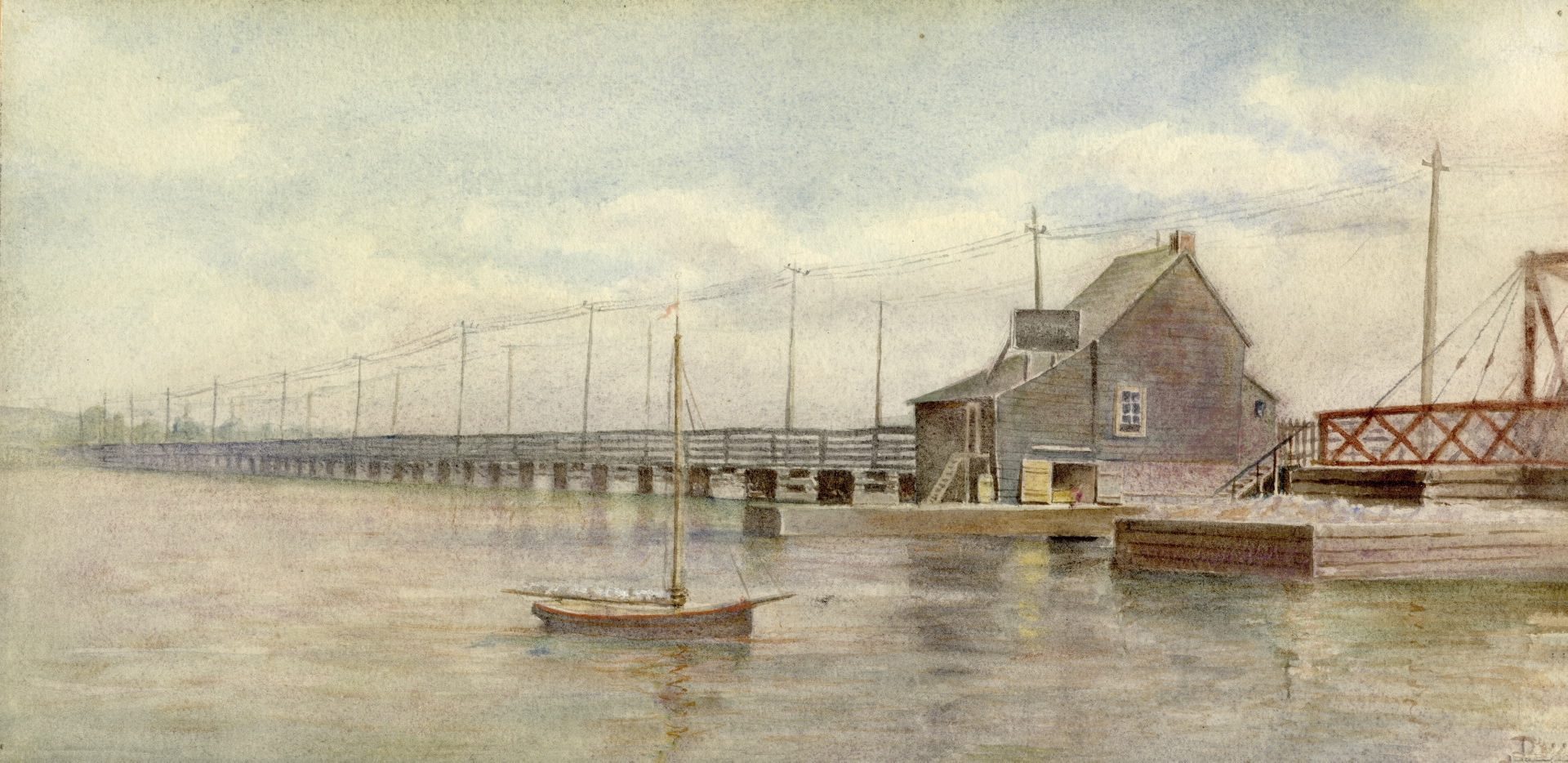
Cataraqui Bridge and Toll House circa 1900. Watercolour by Ella Isabel Fraser (1856–1943). View is to the east.

The first attempt at transportation across the river was a cable-operated scow type of ferry that began operating in 1786. Two rowboats were often available for use as well.

In 1826, the Cataraqui Bridge Company was formed to build a wooden bridge "1800 feet long by 25 feet wide and built on stone piers" (548.6 m × 7.6 m). The Cataraqui Bridge was opened in 1829. Tolls were collected from a toll booth on the west end of the bridge, and since pedestrians were charged a penny, the bridge was popularly known as the "Penny Bridge." A drawbridge allowed larger vessels to pass through but was eventually replaced by an easier-to-operate swing bridge.

In 1917, the Penny Bridge was replaced by the causeway which included three bridges: two bridges at each end of the causeway, and the centre bascule lift bridge. Only the original centre lift bridge remains since the steel bridges at the east and the west ends of the causeway were replaced with concrete bridges in 1962 and 1993, respectively.

On March 30, 2024, a diagonal steel truss element supporting the counterweight on the lift bridge was damaged while work was carried out to strengthen it. Public Services and Procurement Canada soon followed with an announcement about a long-term closure of the bridge.

On May 28, 2024, Public Services and Procurement Canada announced that the lift bridge will be demolished and replaced by a new movable bridge.

On October 3, 2024, a temporary modular bridge that has replaced the lift bridge was opened to traffic and pedestrians.

== See also ==
- Waaban Crossing – another crossing of the Cataraqui River
- List of bascule bridges
- List of bridges in Canada

== Bibliography ==
- Armstrong, Alvin. Buckskin to Broadloom - Kingston Grows Up. Kingston Whig-Standard, 1973. No ISBN.
- Mika, Nick and Helma et al. Kingston, Historic City. Belleville: Mika Publishing Co., 1987. ISBN 0-921341-06-7.
