= Waaban Crossing =

Road bridge in Kingston, Ontario, Canada

- Coordinates: 44°15′31″N 76°28′21″W
- Crosses: Cataraqui River
- Locale: Kingston, Ontario, Canada
- Begins: John Counter Boulevard
- Ends: Gore Road
- Other name: Third Crossing
- Owner: City of Kingston

Characteristics
- Total length: 1.2 km (0.75 mi)
- Height: 6.7 m (22 ft)
- No. of lanes: 2

History
- Architect: Hatch
- Constructed by: Kiewit Construction
- Construction cost: $180 million
- Opened: December 13, 2022

Location
- Interactive map of Waaban Crossing

The Waaban Crossing (known as the Third Crossing bridge during development) is a 1.2-kilometre (0.75 mi) crossing of the Rideau Canal on the Cataraqui River in Kingston, Ontario, linking John Counter Boulevard on the western side of the river with Gore Road on the eastern side.

The bridge opened in December 2022, at a cost of $180 million funded by equal contributions from the city, provincial, and federal governments. The bridge has one vehicle lane in each direction for road traffic, and a multimodal lane for pedestrians and cyclists.

== History ==
The Cataraqui River forms the lower portion of the Rideau Canal and drains into Lake Ontario at Kingston. The river was first crossed in 1917 by the La Salle Causeway in downtown Kingston, today forming part of Highway 2. In the 1960s, the city of Kingston was bypassed by Highway 401, which provided an additional crossing of the river to the north.

A third crossing of the river was first proposed in the 1960s, owing to the congestion at the La Salle Causeway lift bridge. In the 1990s, plans for a third crossing were put on hold, after the provincial government planned to widen Highway 401 in the area. Following amalgamation of local municipalities in 1998 by the Mike Harris provincial government, the new City of Kingston identified the need for increased capacity across the river in 2004. In 2012, the environmental assessment into a bridge was completed, with an estimated cost of $110 million. Initial conceptual designs of the bridge featured a large steel arch, and a lookout point for pedestrians crossing the river.

In 2014, Bryan Paterson was elected mayor of Kingston. He announced his intent to have the bridge under construction within his first term of office. In June 2017, the provincial government committed $60 million to a new bridge, with Kingston City Council committing an additional $60 million shortly afterwards. In February 2018, Kingston and the Islands MP Mark Gerretsen announced that the application for $60 million of federal infrastructure funds had been successful. Gerretsen praised Kingston and the Islands MPP Sophie Kiwala for persuading the provincial government to provide funds.

In August 2018, the City of Kingston selected a consortium of Kiewit, Hatch and SYSTRA to design and construct the bridge. Despite criticism from the local community that the bridge should be built with 4 lanes rather than 2, or that the bridge should not be built at all owing to its high cost – construction of the bridge began in 2019. The design of the bridge was finalised in January 2020, with consideration of the UNESCO World Heritage Site status of the Rideau Canal. In March 2022, Mayor Paterson announced that following community consultation, the bridge would be named Waaban Crossing, after an Ojibwe word meaning dawn or morning light.

The bridge opened to the public on December 13, 2022. Built at a cost of $180 million, the bridge was completed on time and on budget, despite the COVID-19 pandemic. The bridge has one vehicle lane in each direction for road traffic, and a multimodal lane for pedestrians and cyclists.

== See also ==
- La Salle Causeway – Causeway in Kingston, Ontario
