= Cataraqui River =

River in Eastern Ontario, Canada

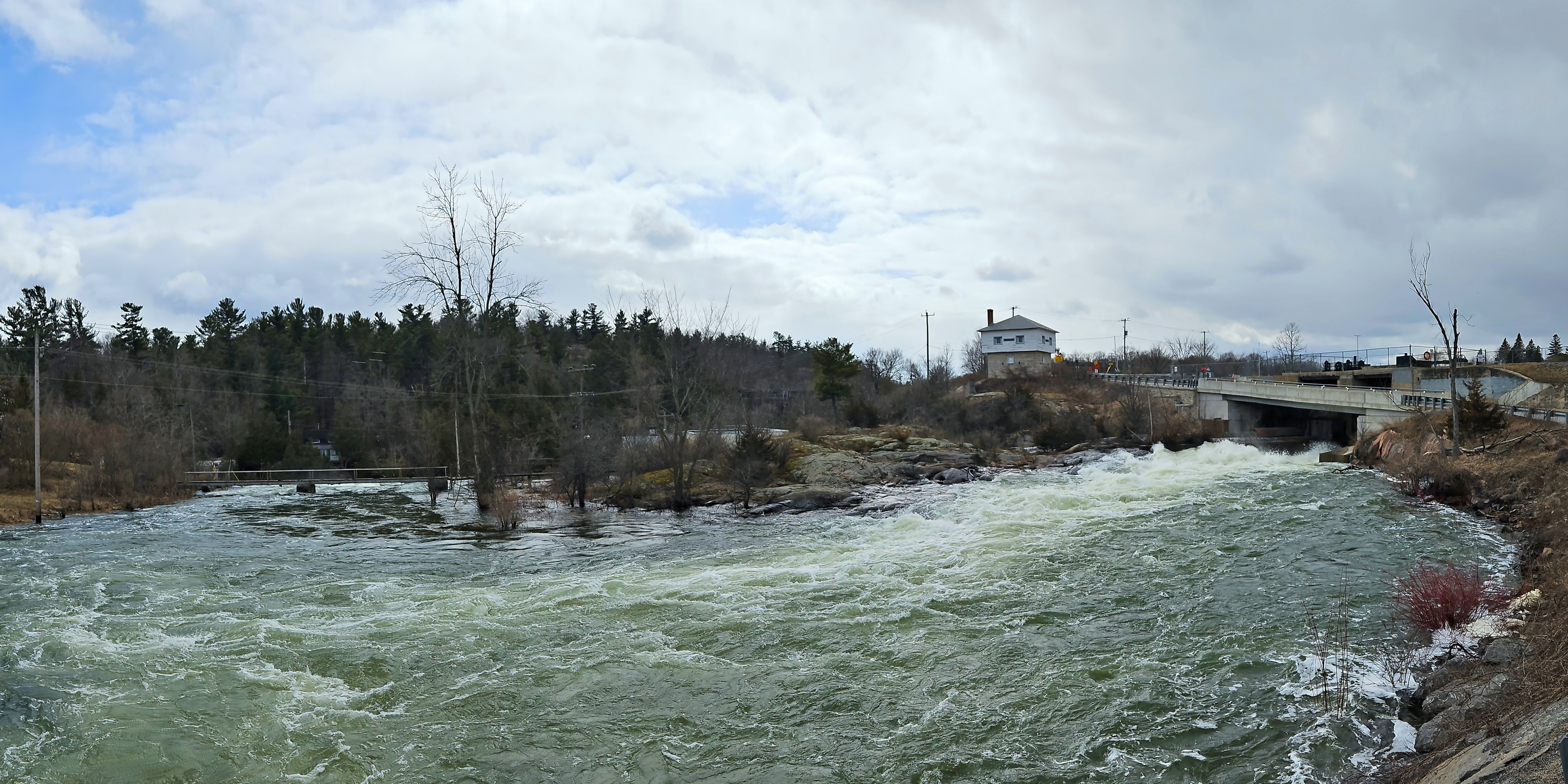
- Cataraqui River at Kingston Mills

- Location within Southern Ontario

Location
- Country: Canada
- Province: Ontario

Physical characteristics
- Source: Cranberry Lake
  - location: The Round Tail, near Brewers Mills, Kingston
  - coordinates: 44°25′35″N 76°18′27″W
  - elevation: 96 m (315 ft)
- Mouth: Kingston Harbour (Lake Ontario)
  - location: Kingston
  - coordinates: 44°14′03″N 76°28′27″W
  - elevation: 75 m (246 ft)
- Basin size: 910 km^{2} (350 sq mi)

Basin features
- Waterbodies: River Styx, Colonel By Lake
- Inland ports: Kingston Harbour, Kingston Inner Harbour

The Cataraqui River (/ˌkætəˈrɒkweɪ/ KAT-ə-ROK-way) forms the lower portion of the Rideau Canal and drains into Lake Ontario at Kingston, Ontario. The name is taken from the original name for Kingston, Ontario; its exact meaning, however, is undetermined. Early maps showed several name variations including the Great Cataraqui River and Grand River Cataraquay. The river was once called Riviere de Frontenac, or Frontenac River. The alternate spelling "Cadaraqui" also appears in some historic texts.

A portion of the Cataraqui River that significantly widens north from Charon Point is also known as River Styx.

The Cataraqui Region Conservation Authority administers water management concerns within the Cataraqui River watershed.

== History ==
Prior to the Rideau Canal being built (1826 – 1832), the Cataraqui River had its headwaters in Dog and Loughborough Lakes. It was a meandering creek, a 1795 map (by surveyor Lewis Grant) noted "a great number of rapids and Carrying Places on this creek." This changed with the building of the Rideau Canal. The Superintending Engineer of the project, Lt. Colonel John By, used a slackwater construction technique, building dams to drown rapids. In the area of the Cataraqui Creek from Upper Brewers to Kingston Mills he had the forests cut down to form a straight channel (this work is visible in the Burrowes paintings of Brewer's Lower Mill shown below). The area was then flooded in late 1831/early 1832 with the completion of canal dams at Kingston Mills, Lower Brewers and Upper Brewers.

Today the watershed of the Cataraqui River includes lakes south of the watershed divide at Newboro, such as Sand, Opinicon, Clear and Newboro. However, in the pre-canal era, water from those lakes flowed into the White Fish River which drained to the Gananoque River rather than the Cataraqui River. The section between those two rivers was the Cranberry Flood Plain; the only water contribution from the White Fish River to the Cataraqui was in times of spring flood. This changed in the early 1800s with the building of a mill dam by Lemuel Haskins at White Fish Falls, near today's village of Morton. That dam retarded the outflow of the White Fish River to the Gananoque, backed it up over the Cranberry Flood Plain, sending water south to the Cataraqui River. To stop the escape of his mill water down Cataraqui Creek, Haskins built a second dam at the Round Tail (just north of Upper Brewers) which blocked the channel of the creek. These two dams made the Cataraqui Flood Plain navigable for the first time.

When the Rideau Canal was built, Haskins' dam at Morton was enlarged and a new dam was built at Upper Brewers. Those two dams (managed today by Parks Canada) created Whitefish Lake, Little Cranberry Lake and much expanded Cranberry and Dog lakes. Most of the flow from what was previously the White Fish River watershed now flows down the Cataraqui River.

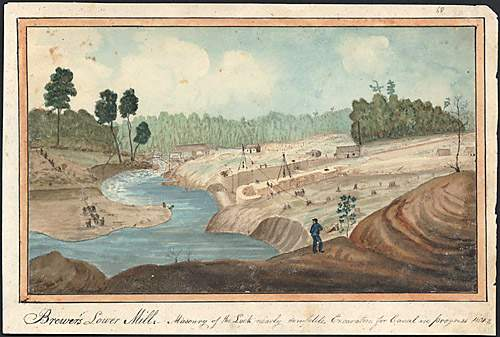
The lock at Lower Brewers nearing completion in 1831 by Thomas Burrowes

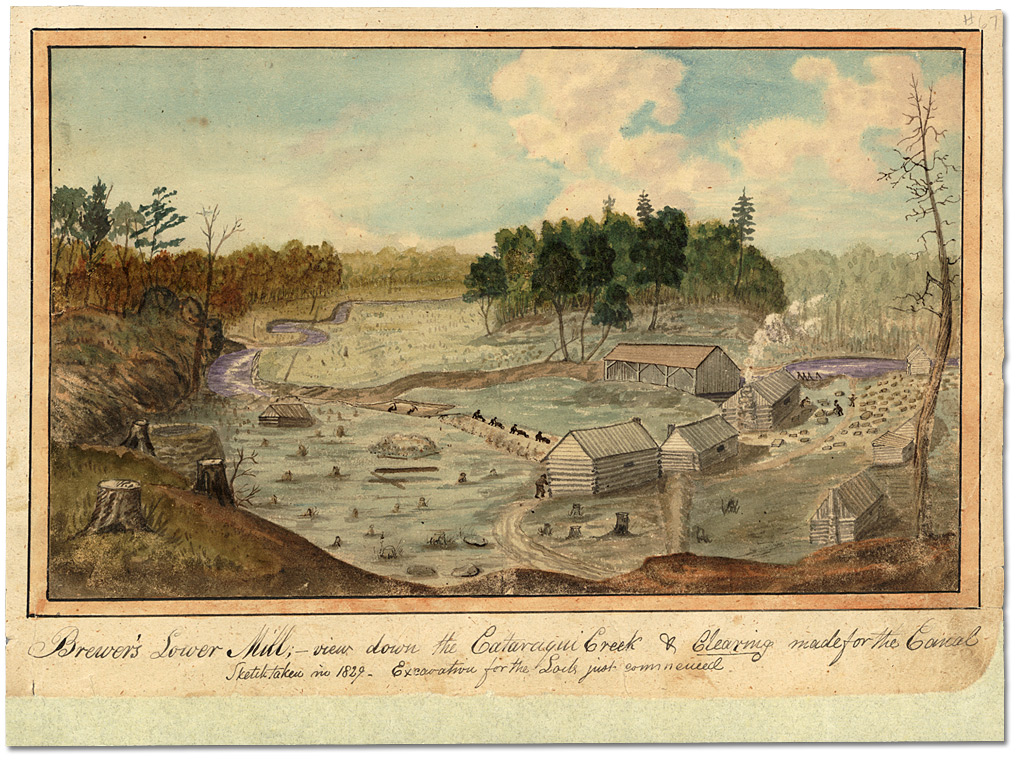
Brewer's Lower Mill - view down the Cataraqui Creek and clearing made for the Rideau Canal, 1829 by Thomas Burrowes

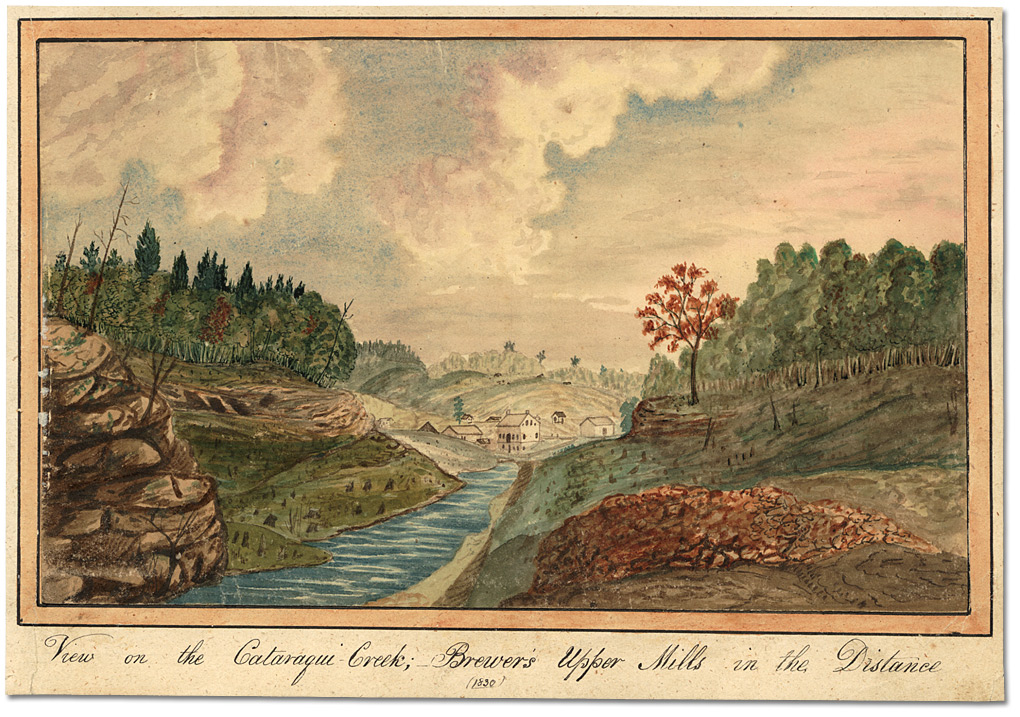
View on the Cataraqui Creek, Brewer's Upper Mills in the background, 1830 by Thomas Burrowes

== See also ==
- List of Ontario rivers
- La Salle Causeway
- Waaban Crossing
- Belle Island
