= List of historic places in Kingston, Ontario =

This article is a list of historic places in the City of Kingston, Ontario entered on the Canadian Register of Historic Places, whether they are federal, provincial, or municipal.

See also List of historic places in Ontario.

== List of historic places ==
| Name | Address | Coordinates | Government recognition (CRHP №) | Wikidata ID | Image |
|---|---|---|---|---|---|
| Branch Tower East | Fort Henry Defence Complex; Kingston ON | 44°14′N 76°28′W | Federal (4357) | | More images |
| Defensible Lockmaster's House | Rideau Canal National Historic Site of Canada; Kingston ON | 44°14′52″N 76°11′17″W | Federal (16781) | | |
| Defensible Lockmaster's House | Rideau Canal National Historic Site of Canada; Kingston ON | 44°33′48″N 76°17′29″W | Federal (16782) | | Upload Photo |
| Kingston Harbour, Shoal Martello Tower | In Kingston Harbour; Kingston ON | 44°13′44″N 76°28′41″W | Federal (4737) | | More images |
| Lower Brewers Defensible Lockmaster's House | Rideau Canal National Historic Site of Canada; Kingston (Washburn) ON | 44°23′20″N 76°19′30″W | Federal (11024) | | |
| Vimy Barracks Building B7 | 1 Estafette Street, Vimy Barracks; CFB Kingston ON | 44°14′24″N 76°26′13″W | Federal (2883) | | Upload Photo |
| 1 Baiden Street | 1 Baiden Street; Kingston ON | 44°13′18″N 76°31′09″W | Kingston municipality (9664) | | |
| 157-161 Queen Street | 157 Queen Street; Kingston ON | 44°13′59″N 76°29′08″W | Kingston municipality (9734) | | |
| 223 King Street East, Kingston | 223 King Street East; Kingston ON | 44°13′39″N 76°29′01″W | Ontario (8265) | | More images |
| 232 King Street East | 232 King Street East; Kingston ON | 44°13′40″N 76°29′00″W | Kingston municipality (15961) | | More images |
| 610 Montreal Street | 610 Montreal Street; Kingston ON | 44°14′54″N 76°29′12″W | Kingston municipality (14101) | | Upload Photo |
| 9 North Street | 9 North Street; Kingston ON | 44°14′15″N 76°28′53″W | Kingston municipality (15958) | | Upload Photo |
| Administration Building /Cell Block (C-18, C-16) | Former Women's Prison; Kingston ON | 44°13′43″N 76°33′21″W | Federal (7584) | | |
| Anglican Diocesan Centre | 90 Johnson Street; Kingston ON | 44°13′46″N 76°29′02″W | Kingston municipality (10768) | | More images |
| Ann Baillie Building National Historic Site of Canada | Kingston General Hospital Complex; Kingston ON | 44°13′26″N 76°29′30″W | Federal (4024) | | More images |
| Armoury | 100 Montreal Street; Kingston ON | 44°14′02″N 76°29′02″W | Federal (3308) | | Upload Photo |
| Barriefield Heritage Conservation District | On a hillside rising from the eastern shore of the Great Cataraqui River, adjacent to the intersection of Highways 2 and 15 near Fort Henry, the Royal Military College and Canadian Forces Base Kingston; Kingston ON | 44°14′26″N 76°27′42″W | Kingston municipality (10829) | | Upload Photo |
| Bellevue House National Historic Site of Canada | 35 Centre Street; Kingston ON | 44°13′22″N 76°30′12″W | Federal (1284, (4355) | | More images |
| Blockhouse | Kingston Mills Lock; Kingston ON | 44°17′34″N 76°26′34″W | Federal (10653) | | Upload Photo |
| Bradstreet Block | Tête de Pont barracks in Fort Frontenac; Kingston ON | 44°14′03″N 76°28′41″W | Federal (4330) | | Upload Photo |
| Branch Tower West | Fort Henry; Kingston ON | 44°14′N 76°28′W | Federal (4356) | | More images |
| Bridge Office and Shop | adjacent to a lift bridge on the Lasalle Causeway of the Rideau Canal; Kingston ON | 44°14′05″N 76°28′30″W | Federal (10056) | | Upload Photo |
| Building B-37 | CFB Kingston; Kingston ON | 44°14′37″N 76°27′22″W | Federal (11324) | | Upload Photo |
| Building B-39 | CFB Kingston; Kingston ON | 44°14′44″N 76°27′20″W | Federal (11323) | | Upload Photo |
| Canadian National Railway Station | 810 Montreal Street; Kingston ON | 44°15′14″N 76°29′06″W | Federal (4629) | | More images |
| Caponier | Fort Henry; Kingston ON | 44°13′49″N 76°27′37″W | Federal (4363) | | More images |
| Cataraqui Cemetery National Historic Site of Canada | Cataraqui Cemetery, 927 Purdy’s Mill Road; Kingston ON | 44°15′40″N 76°32′32″W | Federal (18925) | | |
| Cedar Island Cathcart Tower | Cedar Island; Kingston ON | 44°13′32″N 76°27′15″W | Federal (10111) | | More images |
| Church of the Good Thief (Roman Catholic) | 743 King Street West; Kingston ON | 44°13′14″N 76°31′21″W | Ontario (10402) | | More images |
| Collins Bay Institution, Administration Building, A-1 | Federal Penitentiary at Collins Bay; Kingston ON | 44°14′N 76°34′W | Federal (3296) | | More images |
| Collins Bay Institution, Cell Block, Building B-1 | 455 Bath Road, Collins Bay Institution; Kingston ON | 44°14′N 76°34′W | Federal (2658) | | Upload Photo |
| Commissariat Stores / Reverse Fire Chamber East | Fort Henry; Kingston ON | 44°14′N 76°28′W | Federal (4362) | | Upload Photo |
| Commissariat Stores / Reverse Fire Chamber West | Fort Henry Defence Complex; Kingston ON | 44°14′N 76°28′W | Federal (4397) | | Upload Photo |
| Courcelles Block | Tête de Pont barracks in Fort Frontenac; Kingston ON | 44°14′03″N 76°28′41″W | Federal (4331) | | Upload Photo |
| Curtain Wall and Demi-Bastions | Fort Henry; Kingston ON | 44°14′N 76°28′W | Federal (4359) | | Upload Photo |
| De Noyan Block | Fort Frontenac; Kingston ON | 44°14′02″N 76°28′41″W | Federal (3317) | | Upload Photo |
| East Workshop | Kingston Penitentiary; Kingston ON | 44°13′09″N 76°30′45″W | Federal (10242) | | Upload Photo |
| Elizabeth Cottage National Historic Site of Canada | 251 Brock Street; Kingston ON | 44°13′54″N 76°29′21″W | Federal (11909) | | More images |
| Elmhirst House | 443 Union Street West; Kingston ON | 44°13′27″N 76°30′41″W | Federal (19617) | | Upload Photo |
| Former Prison for Women | Kingston Penitentiary, Building A3; Kingston ON | 44°13′18″N 76°30′49″W | Federal (10239) | | |
| Former Warden's Residence | 555 King Street West; Kingston ON | 44°13′18″N 76°30′49″W | Federal (10217) | | More images |
| Fort Champlain Cadet Quarters (B34) | RMC Kingston; Kingston ON | 44°13′59″N 76°27′58″W | Federal (2672) | | Upload Photo |
| Fort Frontenac National Historic Site of Canada | 1 Ontario Street; Kingston ON | 44°14′01″N 76°28′41″W | Federal (12130) | | More images |
| Fort Henry National Historic Site of Canada | Point Henry between the mouth of Kingston harbour and a second natural harbour at the mouth of the Cataraqui River; Kingston ON | 44°13′52″N 76°27′35″W | Federal (7869) | | More images |
| Fort Lasalle Dormitory | RMC Kingston; Kingston ON | 44°14′00″N 76°28′00″W | Federal (4812) | | More images |
| Frontenac County Court House National Historic Site of Canada | 1 Court Street; Kingston ON | 44°13′40″N 76°29′23″W | Federal (12033), Ontario (8845) | | More images |
| Registry Office | 1 Court Street; Kingston ON | 44°13′38″N 76°29′27″W | Kingston municipality (10770) | | |
| Guardhouse No. 14 | Point Frederick, RMC Kingston; Kingston ON | 44°14′00″N 76°28′00″W | Federal (4785) | | Upload Photo |
| Health Care Clinic (Building B-62) | CFB Kingston; Kingston ON | 44°14′50″N 76°27′35″W | Federal (2685) | | Upload Photo |
| Heating Plant, former Commissariat Storehouse | Tête de Pont barracks in Fort Frontenac; Kingston ON | 44°14′03″N 76°28′41″W | Federal (4332) | | Upload Photo |
| Hewitt House | RMC Kingston; Kingston ON | 44°14′00″N 76°28′00″W | Federal (4807) | | Upload Photo |
| Inglewood | 110 Collingwood Street; Kingston ON | 44°13′31″N 76°30′04″W | Kingston municipality (15960) | | More images |
| Kingston City Hall National Historic Site of Canada | 216 Ontario Street; Kingston ON | 44°13′48″N 76°28′49″W | Federal (7628) | | More images |
| Custom House | 294 King Street East; Kingston ON | 44°13′46″N 76°28′56″W | Federal (3291) | | More images |
| Kingston Customs House National Historic Site of Canada | 294 King Street East; Kingston ON | 44°13′47″N 76°28′56″W | Federal (7538) | | More images |
| Kingston Dry Dock National Historic Site of Canada | 55 Ontario Street; Kingston ON | 44°13′34″N 76°29′02″W | Federal (10531) | | More images |
| Kingston Drydock Pumphouse | 55 Ontario Street; Kingston ON | 44°13′29″N 76°28′58″W | Federal (4696) | | More images |
| Kingston Fortifications National Historic Site of Canada | Kingston ON | 44°13′45″N 76°28′57″W | Federal (13858) | | Upload Photo |
| Kingston General Hospital National Historic Site of Canada | 76 Stuart Street; Kingston ON | 44°13′28″N 76°29′34″W | Federal (4218) | | More images |
| Kingston Navy Yard National Historic Site of Canada | Campus of the Royal Military College; Kingston ON | 44°13′28″N 76°29′34″W | Federal (10484) | | |
| Kingston Penitentiary National Historic Site of Canada | King Street West; Kingston ON | 44°13′11″N 76°30′49″W | Federal (13265) | | More images |
| LaSalle Block | Fort Frontenac; Kingston ON | 44°14′02″N 76°28′41″W | Federal (3318) | | Upload Photo |
| Lockmaster's House | Kingston Mills Lock, Rideau Canal; Kingston ON | 44°17′31″N 76°26′31″W | Federal (11333) | | Upload Photo |
| Main Cellblock | Kingston Penitentiary; Kingston ON | 44°13′16″N 76°30′45″W | Federal (3309) | | |
| Market Square Heritage Conservation District | roughly bounded by King, Clarence, Brock, and Ontario Streets; Kingston ON | 44°13′47″N 76°28′49″W | Kingston municipality (7430) | | Upload Photo |
| Murney Martello Tower | 18 King Street West; Kingston ON | 44°13′20″N 76°29′26″W | Federal (10810) | | More images |
| Murney Tower National Historic Site of Canada | 18 King Street West; Kingston ON | 44°13′21″N 76°29′26″W | Federal (7640) | | More images |
| North Lodge | 555 King Street (Kingston Penitentiary); Kingston ON | 44°13′08″N 76°30′47″W | Federal (3656) | | Upload Photo |
| Northeast Tower Building D-1 | Collins Bay Institution; Kingston ON | 44°14′N 76°34′W | Federal (2761) | | |
| Northwest Tower Building D-4 | Collins Bay Institution; Kingston ON | 44°14′N 76°34′W | Federal (2800) | | Upload Photo |
| Old Fort Henry, Reverse Fire Gallery West | Fort Henry; Kingston ON | 44°13′49″N 76°27′37″W | Federal (4350) | | |
| Old Kingston Post Office National Historic Site of Canada | 86 Clarence Street; Kingston ON | 44°13′48″N 76°29′00″W | Federal (11661) | | More images |
| Penitentiary Towers | Kingston Penitentiary; Kingston ON | 44°13′08″N 76°30′47″W | Federal (16724) | | Upload Photo |
| Point Frederick Buildings National Historic Site of Canada | Point Frederick, RMC Kingston; Kingston ON | 44°13′40″N 76°28′10″W | Federal (11616) | | More images |
| Portsmouth Community Correctional Centre | 508 Portsmouth Avenue; Kingston ON | 44°14′15″N 76°31′44″W | Federal (9769) | | More images |
| First Baptist Church | 110 Sydenham Street; Kingston ON | 44°13′51″N 76°29′16″W | Kingston municipality (15959) | | More images |
| Light Tower | Pigeon Island, southwest of Wolfe Island; Kingston ON | 44°04′00″N 76°33′00″W | Federal (13343) | | Upload Photo |
| Post Office (Old) | 86 Clarence Street; Kingston ON | 44°13′47″N 76°28′56″W | Federal (16442) | | |
| Prince George Hotel | 200 Ontario Street; Kingston ON | 44°13′45″N 76°28′51″W | Ontario (1503) | | More images |
| Redoubt | Fort Henry; Kingston ON | 44°14′N 76°28′W | Federal (4354) | | |
| Reverse Fire Gallery East | Fort Henry; Kingston ON | 44°13′49″N 76°27′37″W | Federal (4352) | | |
| Rideau Canal National Historic Site of Canada | Rideau Street from Kingston to Ottawa ON | 44°40′45″N 76°13′16″W | Federal (5727) | | More images |
| RMC Buildings: Gatehouse #3 | Point Frederick, RMC Kingston; Kingston ON | 44°14′00″N 76°28′00″W | Federal (4784) | | Upload Photo |
| Rochleau Property | 68 Princess Street; Kingston ON | 44°13′53″N 76°28′53″W | Ontario (8899) | | Upload Photo |
| Ross Block | Tête de Pont barracks in Fort Frontenac; Kingston ON | 44°14′03″N 76°28′41″W | Federal (4335) | | Upload Photo |
| Royal Military College of Canada Building 2 | RMC Kingston; Kingston ON | 44°14′06″N 76°28′13″W | Federal (11224) | | |
| Royal Military College of Canada Building 24 | RMC Kingston; Kingston ON | 44°13′48″N 76°27′58″W | Federal (11184) | | |
| Royal Military College of Canada Building 27 | RMC Kingston; Kingston ON | 44°13′44″N 76°28′01″W | Federal (11113) | | |
| Royal Military College of Canada Building 3 | RMC Kingston; Kingston ON | 44°14′06″N 76°28′09″W | Federal (11327) | | |
| Royal Military College of Canada Building 30a Guardhouse | RMC Kingston; Kingston ON | 44°17′17″N 76°28′08″W | Federal (11132) | | |
| Royal Military College of Canada Building 31 | RMC Kingston; Kingston ON | 44°13′44″N 76°28′11″W | Federal (11332) | | |
| Royal Military College of Canada Building 36 former Riding Stables | RMC Kingston; Kingston ON | 44°14′07″N 76°28′08″W | Federal (11101) | | |
| Royal Military College of Canada Building 5 | RMC Kingston; Kingston ON | 44°14′02″N 76°28′01″W | Federal (11197) | | |
| Royal Military College of Canada Building 55 | RMC Kingston; Kingston ON | 44°13′48″N 76°28′01″W | Federal (11325) | | |
| Royal Military College of Canada Building 6 | RMC Kingston; Kingston ON | 44°14′00″N 76°28′00″W | Federal (11244) | | Upload Photo |
| Royal Military College of Canada Building 9 | Ridout Row, RMC Kingston; Kingston ON | 44°14′03″N 76°28′06″W | Federal (11166) | | Upload Photo |
| Royal Military College of Canada Building 9a | Ridout Row, RMC Kingston; Kingston ON | 44°14′03″N 76°28′07″W | Federal (11168) | | |
| Royal Military College of Canada Commandants Residence, former Royal Navy Hospital, Building 10 | RMC Kingston; Kingston ON | 44°14′00″N 76°28′00″W | Federal (4391) | | More images |
| Royal Military College of Canada Currie Building, Building No. 15 | RMC Kingston; Kingston ON | 44°14′00″N 76°28′00″W | Federal (4389) | | More images |
| Royal Military College of Canada Fort Frederick Magazine Building R30B (1846) | RMC Kingston; Kingston ON | 44°13′38″N 76°28′12″W | Federal (11099) | | |
| Royal Military College of Canada Fort Frederick Martello Tower | RMC Kingston; Kingston ON | 44°13′59″N 76°28′01″W | Federal (4390) | | |
| Royal Military College of Canada Stone Frigate (No. 23) | RMC Kingston; Kingston ON | 44°14′00″N 76°28′00″W | Federal (4388) | | More images |
| Royal Military College of Canada, MacKenzie Building | RMC Kingston; Kingston ON | 44°14′00″N 76°28′00″W | Federal (4382) | | More images |
| Royal Military College, Old Gymnasium | RMC Kingston; Kingston ON | 44°14′00″N 76°28′00″W | Federal (4753) | | More images |
| Royal Military College, Yeo Hall Mess Building | RMC Kingston; Kingston ON | 44°14′00″N 76°28′00″W | Federal (4811) | | More images |
| St. Andrew's Manse | 146 Clergy Street East; Kingston ON | 44°14′01″N 76°29′20″W | Kingston municipality (10771) | | Upload Photo |
| St. Andrew's Presbyterian Church | 130 Clergy Street East; Kingston ON | 44°13′57″N 76°29′20″W | Kingston municipality (10772) | | More images |
| St. George's Cathedral | 270 King Street; Kingston ON | 44°13′46″N 76°28′56″W | Ontario (8197) | | More images |
| St. Helen's Complex, Stone Gables | 462 King Street West; Kingston ON | 44°13′13″N 76°30′29″W | Federal (4710) | | More images |
| St. Helen's Complex: Red Cross Lodge | 440 King Street West; Kingston ON | 44°13′13″N 76°30′29″W | Federal (6220) | | Upload Photo |
| St. Helen's Complex: St. Helen's | 440 King Street West; Kingston ON | 44°13′13″N 76°30′29″W | Federal (16462) | | Upload Photo |
| St. Helen's Complex: Grant House | 440 King Street West; Kingston ON | 44°13′13″N 76°30′29″W | Federal (4712) | | Upload Photo |
| Shelter | Cedar Island, St. Lawrence Islands National Park; Kingston ON | 44°13′42″N 76°27′02″W | Federal (11280) | | Upload Photo |
| Shoal Tower National Historic Site of Canada | Kingston Harbour; Kingston ON | 44°13′44″N 76°28′41″W | Federal (11810) | | More images |
| Sir John A. Macdonald Gravesite National Historic Site of Canada | Cataraqui Cemetery; Kingston ON | 44°15′44″N 76°32′32″W | Federal (12964) | | More images |
| South Workshop | Kingston Penitentiary; Kingston ON | 44°13′07″N 76°30′49″W | Federal (10243) | | Upload Photo |
| Vimy Barracks (B-6) | CFB Kingston; Kingston ON | 44°13′58″N 76°27′37″W | Federal (9800) | | Upload Photo |
| Vimy Barracks (C-1) | CFB Kingston; Kingston ON | 44°13′58″N 76°27′37″W | Federal (11303) | | Upload Photo |
| Vimy Barracks (Forde Building, B-16) | CFB Kingston; Kingston ON | 44°14′15″N 76°26′11″W | Federal (9801) | | Upload Photo |
| Vimy Barracks, Building B-1 | CFB Kingston; Kingston ON | 44°14′18″N 76°26′16″W | Federal (9867) | | Upload Photo |
| Vincent Block / Administration Office | Fort Frontenac; Kingston ON | 44°14′02″N 76°28′41″W | Federal (3311) | | Upload Photo |
| Wartman House | 86 Sunny Acres Road; Kingston ON | 44°12′37″N 76°33′49″W | Kingston municipality (16303) | | More images |
| West Workshop | Kingston Penitentiary; Kingston ON | 44°13′08″N 76°30′50″W | Federal (10241) | | Upload Photo |

== See also ==
- List of National Historic Sites of Canada in Kingston, Ontario
