= Timeline of Kingston, Ontario history =

The timeline of Kingston history shows the significant events in the history of Kingston, Ontario, Canada.

== Aboriginal period ==
- About 500 CE to 1600s – The First Nations settlements

== 17th century ==
- 1673 – Established as Fort Cataraqui; later renamed Fort Frontenac
- 1688 – The Iroquois siege, the French destroyed the fort, but rebuilt it later

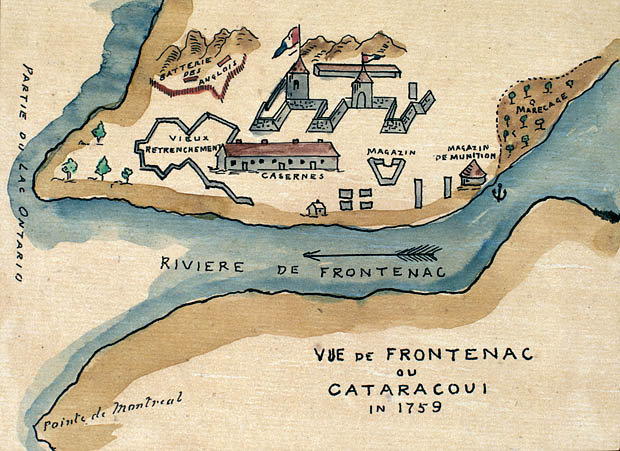
"View of Frontenac or Cataracoui in 1759". Watercolour map depicting Fort Frontenac

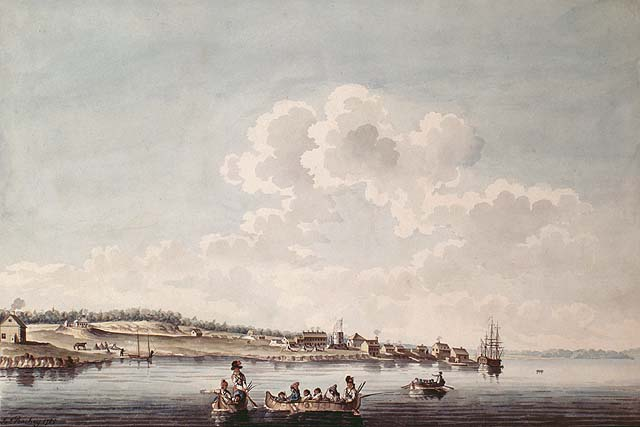
A Southeast View of Cataraqui, by James Peachey, August 1785

== 18th century ==
- 1758 – The British destroyed the fort during the Battle of Fort Frontenac (Seven Years’ War) and its ruins remained abandoned
- 1783 – The British took possession and partially reconstructed the fort
- 1783 – The Crawford Purchase, an agreement with the Mississaugas, to purchase land east of the Bay of Quinte, to lay out a settlement for displaced British colonists, or Loyalists, who were fleeing north because of the American Revolutionary War
- 1784 – Influx of Loyalist settlers
- 1787 – Cataraqui was referred to as “the King’s Town” in honour of King George III
- 1788 – The name was abbreviated to “Kingston”
- 1792 – The first high school (grammar school) of Ontario was established (evolved into Kingston Collegiate and Vocational Institute)

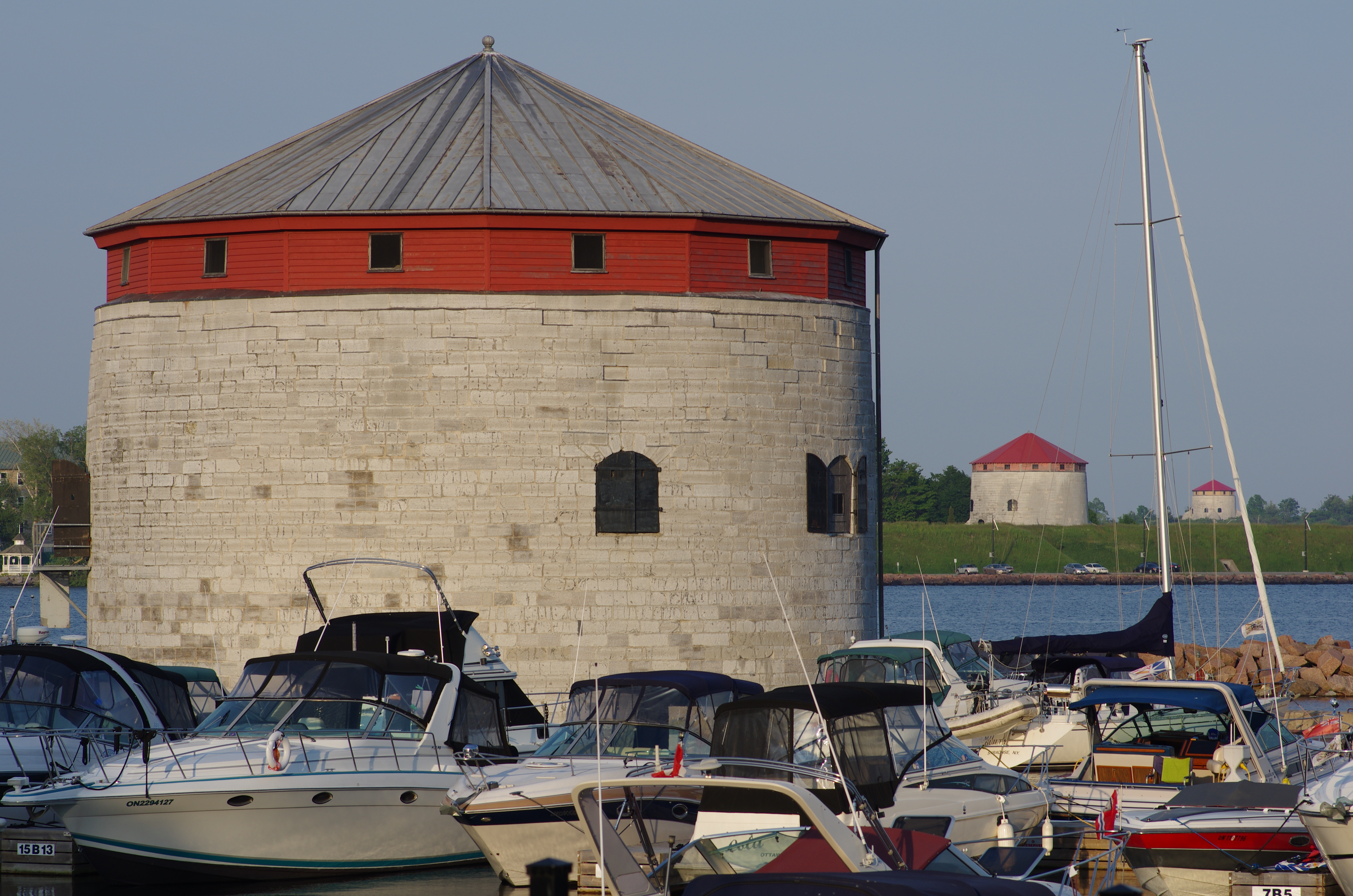
Line of defence: three Martello towers (Shoal Tower, Fort Frederick, Cathcart Tower). A fourth tower, Murney Tower, is southwest of this location

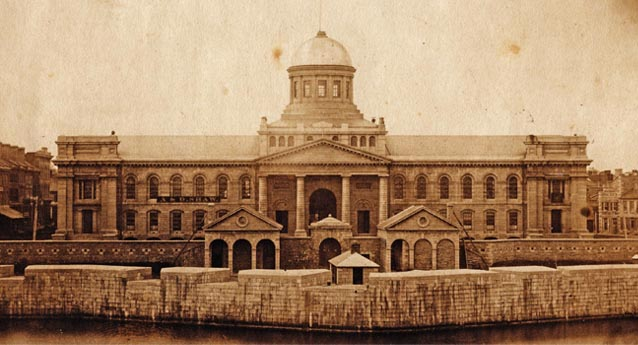
Kingston City Hall and the Market Battery, 1857

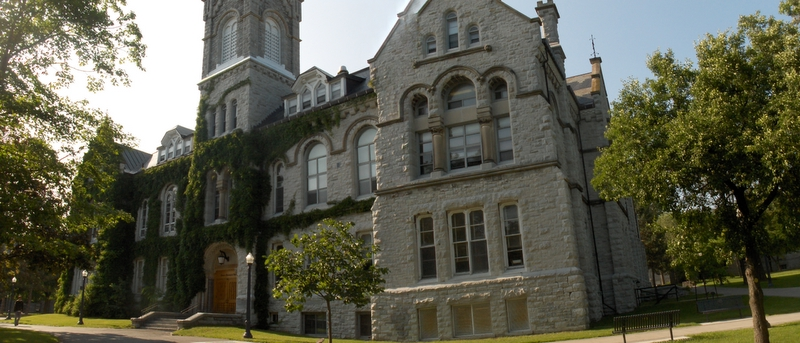
Theological Hall at Queen's University

== 19th century ==
- 1812 – The first Fort Henry was built to protect the dockyards in Navy Bay
- 1812, November – American naval forces attacked the British sloop Royal George in Kingston harbour but the ship took refuge in the harbour and the American forces withdrew
- 1813 – Fort Henry was replaced by a more extensive fort on Point Henry (Kingston population was 2,250)
- 1832–1836 – The construction of Fort Henry’s limestone citadel
- 1832 – Rideau Canal completion
- 1835 – Kingston Penitentiary, Canada’s first large federal penitentiary, was established (operated until 2013)
- 1838 – Kingston incorporated as town
- 1840, April 18 – a dock fire, fanned by high winds, resulted in explosion and spread of the fire throughout the city’s downtown area, destroying a large number of buildings, including the old city hall
- 1840s and later – “the Limestone Revolution” (to prevent similar incidents from occurring in future), Kingston’s nickname became “The Limestone City” since then
- 1840s – Construction of several defensive fortifications because of tensions with the United States (among them are Fort Henry, four Martello towers – Cathcart Tower, Shoal Tower, Murney Tower, and Fort Frederick – and the Market Battery)
- 1841–1844 – Kingston served as the first capital of the united Canadas (the capital then was moved to Montreal)
- 1841, June 13 – The first meeting of the Parliament of the Province of Canada was held on the site of what is now Kingston General Hospital
- 1842 – Queen’s University (originally Queen's College) first held classes
- 1844 – The City Hall completed
- 1846 – Kingston incorporated as city (with a population of 6,123)
- 1847 – North American typhus epidemic; Hotel Dieu and Kingston General Hospital cared for victims
- 1856 – The Grand Trunk Railway reached Kingston
- 1876 – The Royal Military College of Canada was founded
- 1881 – A telephone system began operation; at that time the population was 14,091
- 1888 – Electricity reached Kingston

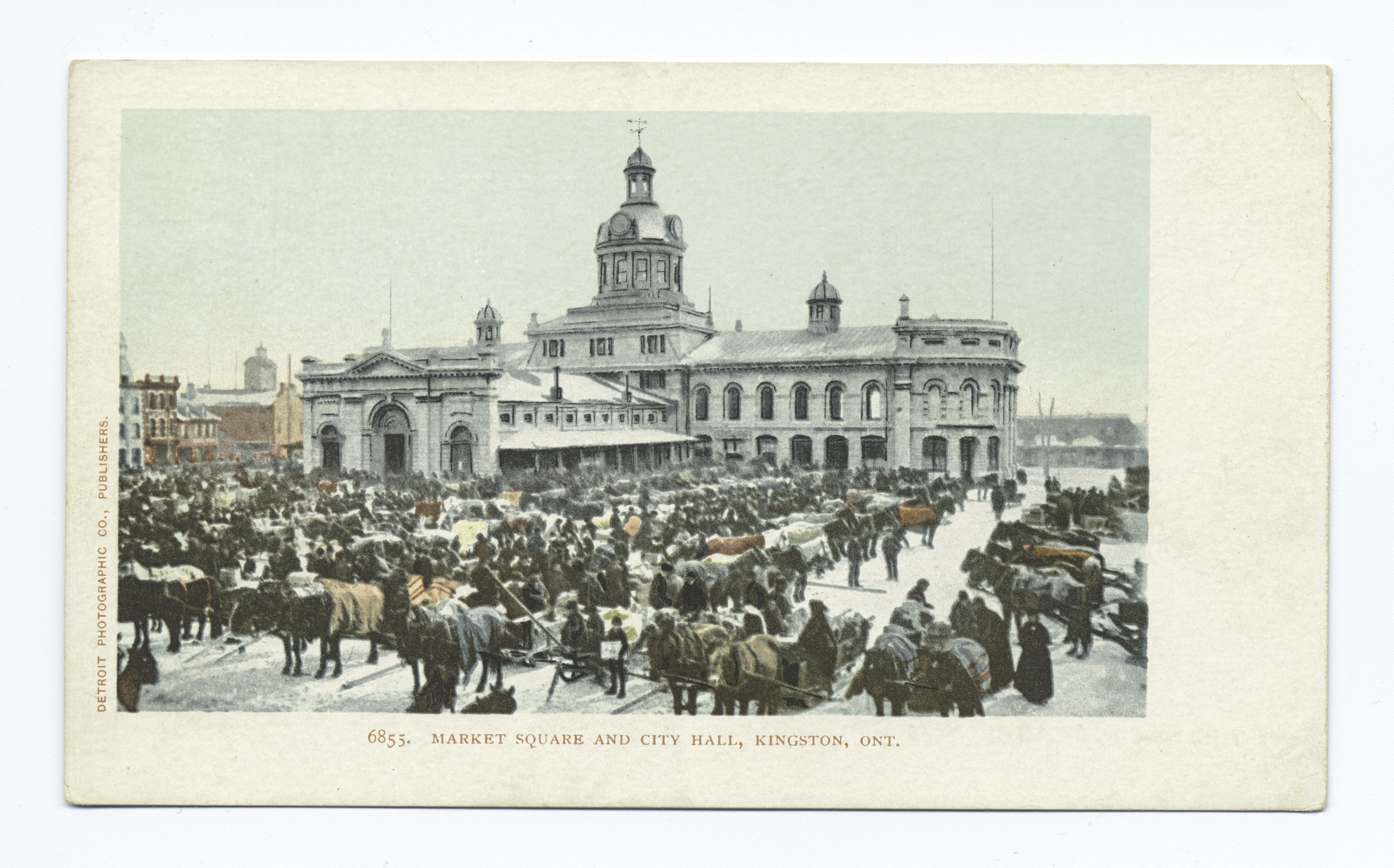
Market Square, early 20th century

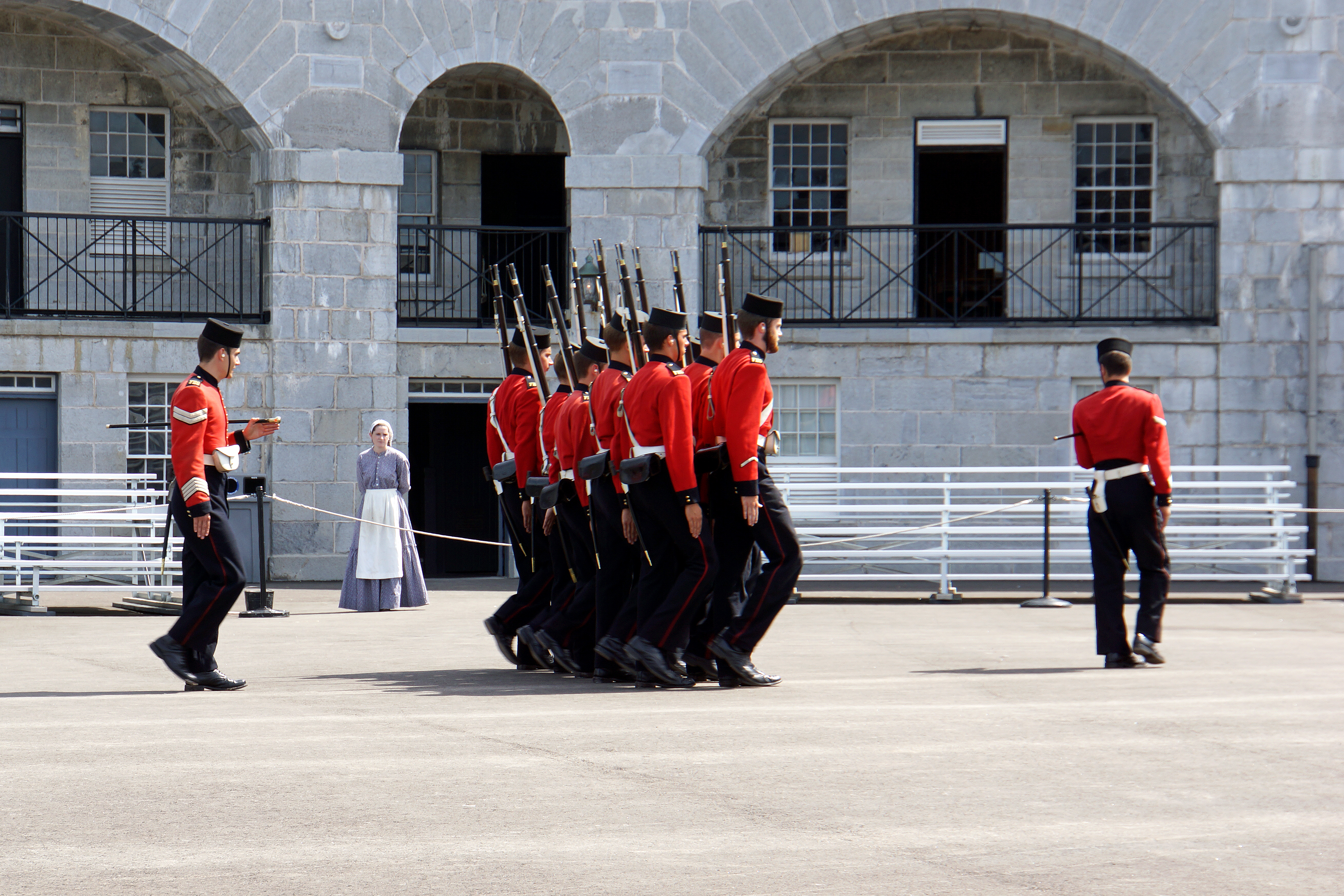
Fort Henry Guard practice drill, Fort Henry

== 20th century ==
- 1914 – Camp Barriefield, now McNaughton Barracks, was constructed
- 1914–1917 – Fort Henry served as an internment camp for “enemy aliens”
- 1936 – Fort Henry restoration, now part of a World Heritage Site
- 1937 – Vimy Barracks was established for the Royal Canadian School of Signals
- 1939–1943 – Fort Henry was again an internment camp (Camp 31)
- 1959 – The Royal Military College of Canada became the first military college in the Commonwealth with the right to confer University degrees
- 1995 – Kingston General Hospital was designated a National Historic Site of Canada because it is “the oldest public hospital in Canada still in operation with most of its buildings intact”
- 1998 – Amalgamation with Kingston and Pittsburgh Townships

== 21st century ==
- 2024 – The La Salle Causeway, including a bascule lift bridge, was demolished (temporarily replaced by a modular bridge)

== Notes ==
=== Bibliography ===
- Adams, Nick.Iroquois Settlement at Fort Frontenac in the Seventeenth and Early Eighteenth Centuries Archived September 13, 2017, at the Wayback Machine. Ontario Archaeology, No. 46: 4–20. 1986.
- Armstrong, Alvin. Buckskin to Broadloom – Kingston Grows Up. Kingston Whig-Standard, 1973. No ISBN.
- Mika, Nick and Helma et al. Kingston, Historic City. Belleville: Mika Publishing Co., 1987. ISBN 0-921341-06-7.
- Mika, Nick and Helma. Kingston Heritage, Buildings, Monuments, Plaques Belleville: Mika Publishing Co., 1983, 160 pages.
- Osborne, Brian S. and Donald Swainson. Kingston, Building on the Past for the Future. Quarry Heritage Books, 2011. ISBN 1-55082-351-5
- Roy, James. Kingston: The King's Town. Toronto: McClelland and Stewart, 1952.
- Turner, Larry. "The Founding of Kingston, Ontario" Archived July 7, 2011, at the Wayback Machine. The Loyalist Gazette, Volume XXII, No. 1. Retrieved 2015-01-14
- Preston, Richard. Kingston Before the War of 1812: A Collection of Documents Archived December 4, 2021, at the Wayback Machine. Toronto: Champlain Society Publications, 1959.
- The Heritage Ambassadors of Kingston
