= Fort Frederick =

Fort Frederick may refer to:

== Canada ==
- Fort Frederick (Newfoundland)
- Fort Frederick (Kingston, Ontario)
- Fort Frederick (Saint John, New Brunswick), built at the mouth of the St. John River in 1758 by the British during the St. John River Campaign of the French and Indian War

== South Africa ==
- Fort Frederick, Eastern Cape in the central part of Port Elizabeth

== United States ==
- Fort Frederick (Albany), Albany, New York
- Fort Frederick (Maine), a fort rebuilt 1729–30 on the site of Fort William Henry
- Fort Frederick State Park, Maryland
- Fort Frederick, South Carolina
- Fort Frederick Heritage Preserve, South Carolina
- Fort Frederick (Vermont)
- Fort Frederik, U.S. Virgin Islands
- Fort Frederick, U.S. Virgin Islands

== See also ==
- Fort Frederica National Monument, on St. Simons Island, Georgia, USA
- Fort Fredrick, Trincomalee, Sri Lanka
