= List of National Historic Sites of Canada in Kingston, Ontario =

This is a list of National Historic Sites (French: Lieux historiques nationaux du Canada) in Kingston, Ontario. There are 22 National Historic Sites designated in Kingston, including the Rideau Canal which extends from Ottawa and traverses 202 kilometres (126 mi) to Kingston. The following sites are administered by Parks Canada: Bellevue House, Kingston Fortifications, the Rideau Canal and Shoal Tower (identified below by the beaver icon). Fort Henry and Fort Frontenac were both designated in 1923 and were the first sites designated in Kingston.

Numerous National Historic Events also occurred in Kingston, and are identified at places associated with them, using the same style of federal plaque which marks National Historic Sites. Several National Historic Persons are commemorated throughout the city in the same way. The markers do not indicate which designation—a Site, Event, or Person—a subject has been given.

National Historic Sites located elsewhere in Ontario are listed at National Historic Sites in Ontario.

This list uses names designated by the national Historic Sites and Monuments Board, which may differ from other names for these sites.

* UNESCO World Heritage Site unit

== National Historic Sites ==
Site	Date(s)	Designated	Location	Description	Image
Ann Baillie Building	1904 (completed)	1997	Kingston; 44°13′25.56″N 76°29′32.53″W	One of the first purpose-built nurses’ residences in Canada, the building represents the professionalization of nursing in Canada in the early 20th-century, and now serves as the Museum of Health Care	Postcard from circa 1910 showing the Nurses' house at the Kingston General Hospital, now known as the Ann Baillie Building
Bellevue House	1841 (completed)	1995	Kingston; 44°13′22″N 76°30′12″W	A noted example of Italianate architecture in the Picturesque manner in Canada, and the former residence of John A. Macdonald, a Father of Confederation and the first Prime Minister of Canada	Exterior view of Bellevue House in winter
Cataraqui Cemetery	1850 (established)	2011	Kingston; 44°15′52″N 76°32′28″W	One of the best examples of a medium-sized rural or garden cemetery in Canada, containing a range of remarkable monuments, a Gothic Revival lodge, and the graves of many notable Canadians, including John A. Macdonald, the first Prime Minister (itself a NHS)	A view of grave markers in Cataraqui Cemetery
Elizabeth Cottage	1843 (completed)	1993	Kingston; 44°13′54.46″N 76°29′20.26″W	A representative example of a 19th-century Gothic Revival villa	Exterior view of Elizabeth Cottage in winter
Fort Frontenac	1673 (original fort completed)	1923	Kingston; 44°14′00″N 76°28′43″W	Originally a French trading post that served as a gateway to the West, the base of Robert de LaSalle’s explorations and a French outpost against the Iroquois and English forces	Remnants of the old fort with the new Fort Frontenac in background
Fort Henry *	1840 (completed)	1923	Kingston; 44°13′48.95″N 76°27′34.85″W	British fort that served as the principal fortification among a series of military works designed to defend Kingston, its harbour and dockyard and the entrance to the Rideau Canal	Soldiers at Fort Henry
Frontenac County Court House	1858 (completed)	1980	Kingston; 44.227777°N 76.489777°W	Representative of the large-scale court houses erected in Ontario after 1850, when the Ontario Municipal Act was amended to give increased power to counties to construct court houses on a monumental scale to accommodate various county functions	Exterior view of front facade of Frontenac County Court House and fountain
Kingston City Hall and Market Square	1844 (completed)	1961	Kingston; 44°13′47.68″N 76°28′50.1″W	A prominent example of the Neoclassical style in Canada, with a landmark tholobate and dome; its scale and design are reflective of Kingston's status at the time of construction as capital of the Province of Canada. The Kingston Public Market, founded in 1801, is behind city hall and part of the national historic site and is the oldest public market in Ontario.	Exterior view of Kingston City Hall
Kingston Customs House	1859 (completed)	1971	Kingston; 44°13′46.64″N 76°28′56.45″W	A limestone former customs house; an excellent example of the architectural quality of mid-19th-century public buildings designed in the British classical tradition	A 1907 postcard of the Kingston Customs House
Kingston Dry Dock	1892 (completed)	1978	Kingston; 44°13′30.63″N 76°29′0.16″W	An important construction and repair facility for ships on the Great Lakes; noted for the Second World War naval vessels, notably corvettes, built in this dry dock	Dry dock in 1890
Kingston Fortifications	1840 (completed)	1989	Kingston; 44.222275°N 76.490357°W	A fortification system consisting of five installations (Fort Henry NHS, Fort Frederick, Murney Tower NHS, Shoal Tower NHS and Cathcart Tower), crucial to the 19th century defense of Kingston and the terminus of the Rideau Canal	The Martello Tower at Fort Frederick
Kingston General Hospital	1833–1924 (completion of historic buildings)	1995	Kingston; 44°13′27″N 076°29′35″W	A complex of limestone buildings, built between 1833 and 1924, set in a campus of more recent hospital buildings; the oldest public hospital in Canada still in operation, with facilities illustrative of health care in Canada in the 19th and 20th centuries	
Kingston Navy Yard	1788 (established)	1928	Kingston; 44°13′44″N 76°28′07″W	The site of a Royal Navy Dockyard from 1788 to 1853	Naval shipyard, Point Frederick, July 1815. Watercolour by Emeric Essex Vidal. Commodore's house and two ships under construction, the Canada and the Wolfe, can be seen in the background
Kingston Penitentiary	1835 (established)	1990	Kingston; 44.22069°N 76.51340°W	Canada's oldest reformatory prison, with a layout that served as a model for other federal prisons for more than a century; its massive stone wall and north gate are an imposing local landmark	Exterior view of the north gate of Kingston Penitentiary
Murney Tower *	1846 (completed)	1930	Kingston; 44.22228°N 76.490582°W	A martello tower located on Murray Point on the west shore of Kingston Harbour; also a component of the Kingston Fortifications National Historic Site of Canada	Exterior view of Murney Tower
Old Kingston Post Office	1859 (completed)	1971	Kingston; 44°13′47.91″N 76°28′58.89″W	A two-storey, limestone building built in the Neoclassical style, illustrative of the popularity of neoclassical elements in the mid-19th century and the eclecticism of early Victorian architecture in Canada	Exterior view of the Old Post Office in Kingston
Point Frederick Buildings *		1973	Kingston; 44°13′40.73″N 76°28′10.12″W	A peninsula upon which a major British naval base was located during the War of 1812; an assemblage of architecturally significant structures used by the Royal Military College of Canada	Exterior view of the martello tower on Point Frederick in winter
Rideau Canal *	1837 (completed)	1925	Ottawa to Kingston; 45°25′33″N 75°41′50″W	Built for the British government by Lieutenant-Colonel John By as a defensive work in the event of war with the United States, the canal is the best preserved example of a 19th-century slack water canal in North America, with most of its original structures intact	View of the canal locks at Jones Falls
Roselawn	1841 (completed)	1969	Kingston; 44°13′31.98″N 76°30′36.66″W	A two-storey neoclassical house, now used as a conference centre by Queen's University; at one time the centre of a large estate, it is representative of the large 19th-century country houses built for affluent Kingstonians just beyond the (then) city outskirts	Exterior view of the Roselawn house
Shoal Tower *	1847 (completed)	1930	Kingston; 44°13′43.69″N 76°28′41.14″W	A martello tower located on a shoal in Kingston harbour; a component of the Kingston Fortifications NHS, and symbolic of Kingston's military and naval significance in the 19th century	Exterior view of Shoal Tower
Sir John A. Macdonald Gravesite	1891 (burial)	1938	Kingston; 44.262080°N 76.542188°W	The burial place of Sir John A. Macdonald, a Father of Confederation and the first Prime Minister of Canada, in Cataraqui Cemetery NHS	1891 photo of Macdonald's funeral in Cataraqui Cemetery
War of 1812 Shipwrecks	1814 (built)	2015	Kingston; 44.231003°N 76.452241°W	Wrecks of the British ships Saint Lawrence, Princess Charlotte, and Prince Regent in Deadman Bay and elsewhere	

== See also ==
- List of historic places in Kingston, Ontario
