= Kingston Fortifications =

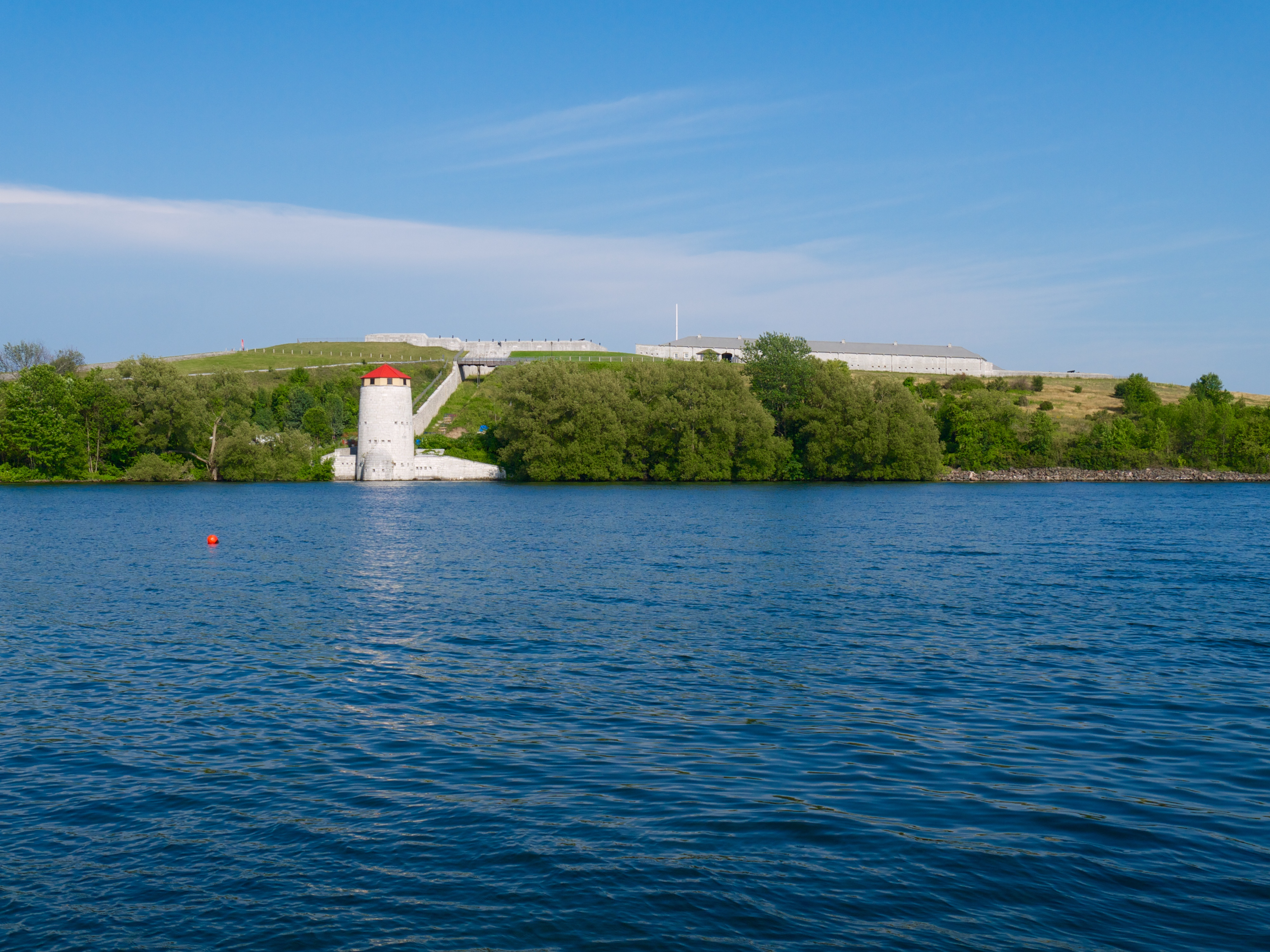
- Established: 1832 to 1840
- Location: Kingston, Ontario, Canada
- Coordinates: 44°13′40″N 76°28′10″W
- Type: fortifications

UNESCO World Heritage Site
- Part of: Rideau Canal
- Criteria: Cultural: (i)(iv)
- Reference: 1221
- Inscription: 2007 (31st Session)

National Historic Site of Canada
- Designated: 1930

The Kingston Fortifications are a series of 19th century defensive works in Kingston, Ontario, Canada, that are National Historic Sites of Canada and UNESCO World Heritage Sites (as part of the Rideau Canal inscription). The fortification system consists of five installations:

- Fort Henry
- Fort Frederick
- Murney Tower
- Shoal Tower
- Cathcart Tower

== See also ==
- List of National Historic Sites of Canada in Kingston, Ontario
