= Museum of Health Care =

Museum in Kingston, Ontario

Canadian Museum of Health Care
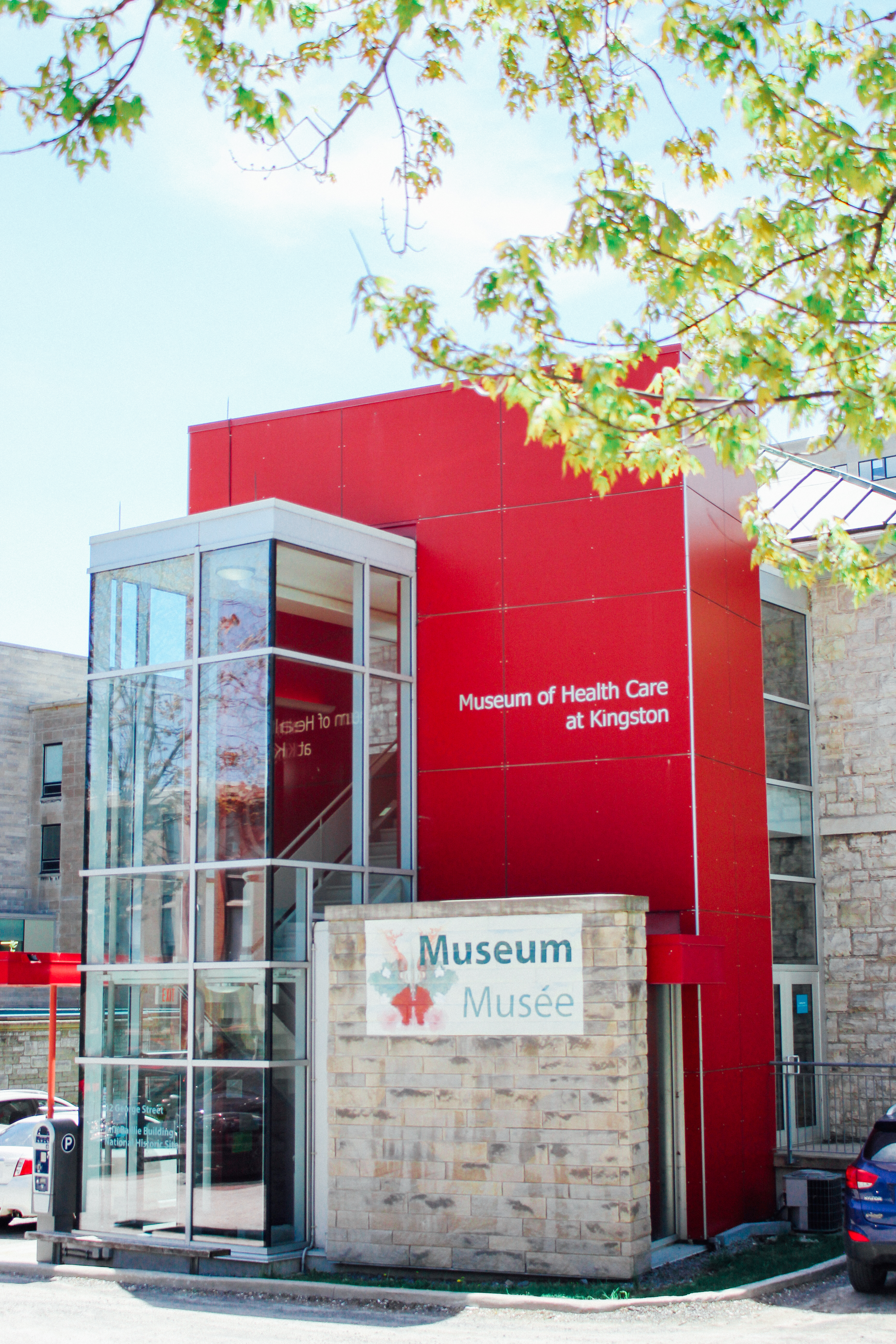
- Canadian Museum of Health Care main entrance.
- Former name: Museum of Health Care at Kingston
- Established: 1904 (as the Ann Baillie nursing student residence); 1995 (as the Canadian Museum of Health Care)
- Location: 32 George Street, Kingston, Ontario, Canada
- Coordinates: 44.22376°N 76.49211°W
- Type: History Museum
- Collection size: 35,000+ artefacts
- Director: Dr. Simge Erdogan-O'Connor
- President: Dr. Ian Gemmill
- Website: museumofhealthcare.ca mhc.andornot.com museumofhealthcare.blog

National Historic Site of Canada
- Designated: 1997

The Canadian Museum of Health Care (operating as the Museum of Health Care at Kingston) is located in Kingston, Ontario, Canada in the Ann Baillie Building on the Kingston General Hospital site and covers medical history from the 18th century to the modern era. Its research and collection are searchable on-line via their website and online catalogue.

== Ann Baillie Building ==
The historic Ann Baillie Building is a 1904 Beaux-Arts style limestone structure and National Historic Site of Canada commemorating the history of nursing education in Canada.

Originally a dormitory, the Ann Baillie Building was designed by Kingston architect William Newlands to house 26 nursing students at the Kingston General Hospital's School of Nursing; its construction was supported by fundraising efforts by the Nurses Alumnae Association. While the first nursing students at Kingston General enrolled in 1886 and graduated in 1888 (the programme being lengthened to three years in 1905), originally nursing student accommodations were located within the hospital itself as quarters both overcrowded and at risk of contamination with infectious disease.

The School of Nursing closed in 1974, after the Ontario provincial government transferred the training of nurses to colleges and universities. As Queen's University constructed its own residence for nursing students, Waldron Tower, the original dormitory was vacated. The building was historically designated by the City of Kingston under the Ontario Heritage Act in 1994 and recognised to be of national historic significance by the Historic Sites and Monuments Board in 1997.

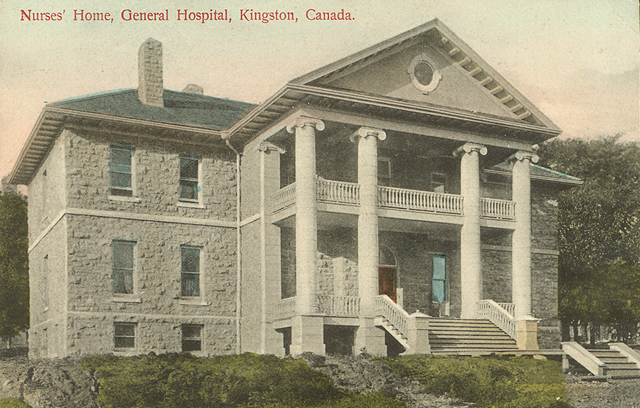
The original Ann Baillie Building from 1904 in Beaux-Art style.

"One of the earliest nurses' residences in Canada, this stately building symbolizes the development and recognition of nursing as a profession. The home was completed in 1904 for students at the Kingston General Hospital nursing school, who cared for patients in the wards and operating rooms as part of their training. The building was later named in honour of Ann Baillie, a graduate of the school and its superintendent from 1924 to 1942. Here as elsewhere, a place of their own helped nurses shape a professional role indispensable to health care within the hospital and the community."

— 1999 historic plaque, Historic Sites and Monuments Board

The building currently houses the Coalition of Canadian Healthcare Museums and Archives as well as the Museum of Health Care.

== Canadian Museum of Health Care ==
In 1995, the Canadian Museum of Health Care was relocated to the Ann Baillie Building. It is the only museum in Canada dedicated to the history of health and health care.

One of the largest collections of medical and healthcare artefacts in Canada, the Canadian Museum of Health Care is home to a wide range of artefacts and archival documents and photographs from surgical tools to laboratory instruments documenting how people have preserved health and managed disease, pain, and suffering from the late 18th century to the present day. The Museum strives to connect visitors with the experience of people in past times and provide context and perspective on contemporary health issues. The Museum serves the general public, practitioners, students, and historians through exhibitions, interpretive programs, and special events throughout the year.

=== History ===
First conceived in 1988 by founder James Low, the Canadian Museum of Health Care was born in 1991 when it began to build its collections of medical and general health objects and archives from across Canada. The Museum relocated to its permanent home in the former nursing-student residence at Kingston General Hospital in 1995. The Museum is a non-profit corporation and registered charity and has had a board of directors since 1996; it bills itself as Canada's only museum dedicated solely to preserving health care history. Dr. James Low, the Museum's administrative officer, was appointed to the Order of Canada in 2014.

The Museum strives to preserve the material history of the medical and healthcare past with the goal of enhancing public understanding of the history of health and health care, particularly in Canada. The Museum acquires, conserves, researches, displays, and interprets artefacts that help to tell these stories. The Museum also serves as a primary resource for scholarly work in the history of health care.

The Museum also has a commitment to scholars: the Museum benefits from the presence of the Hannah Chair, History of Medicine at Queen's University, Kingston General Hospital Archives, Queen's University Archives and Bracken Health Sciences Library at Queen's University.

=== Collections ===
The Museum has an extensive collection of artifacts and archival documents, dating from the 18th century to the present. There are approximately 35,000 items in the artefact and archival collections.

The Museum's collections include a wide range of artefacts including medical, surgical, and laboratory instruments, commemorative objects, and patient care items. Some of the larger collections feature artefacts from the areas of anesthesiology, renal dialysis, orthopaedics, cardiology, patent medicines, nursing, and X-ray.

Significant artefacts include:

- Melrose New Electronic Products Ltd. Extracorporeal Heart and Lung machine with oxygenator, ca. 1958
- “Kingmed” dialysis machine designed and produced at Kingston General Hospital, 1967. Last surviving model.
- A large collection of cardiac pacemakers, 1950s – 1990s
- Prostheses collection (hip, elbow, knee, leg), c.1920–1975.
- Iron lung built at the Hospital for Sick Children, Toronto during a polio outbreak, 1937. Believed to be the last surviving unit in Canada.
- A rare Waite & Bartlett electrostatic generator unit, circa 1910. Used for electrotherapy treatment and early X-ray imaging and treatment.
- A rare collection of medical moulages, (wax gynaecological and obstetrical anatomical teaching models), produced in Kingston, Ontario, 1940s by artist Marjorie Winslow under the guidance of Dr. Edwin Robertson of Queen's University.
- Microscope used by Dr. James B. Collip.
- Over 750 items in the collection of Canadian nursing uniforms, documents, photographs, and memorabilia, 1880s to 2000.
- Over 2700 objects in the Museum's collection of drug containers and pharmacy objects (late 18th century to late 20th century).
- A dental history collection donated by the Canadian Dental Association, reported to include dental chairs, instruments, journals, lab equipment, a plaster dental cast of former prime minister John Diefenbaker’s teeth and a set of painful-looking tooth extraction turn-keys.
- 4000-item collection of medical artefacts from the former Academy of Medicine, Toronto, including:
- Army surgeon’s regulation instrument case, by Gardner, Stodart, circa 1812. A field set belonging to Dr. Henry Grasett, surgeon-in-chief to forces during the War of 1812
- A Mayer & Meltzer carbolic steam sprayer, circa 1870. Technology developed by Dr. Joseph Lister, 1st Baron Lister for sterilizing operating rooms.
- Antiseptic midwifery washbasin, 18th century. Used at the first obstetrics clinic at Vienna General Hospital during the time of Dr. Ignaz Philipp Semmelweis.

The Museum includes both on-site and off-site exhibits, focusing on the development of medicine and health care, in its operations.n on-line tour "From the Collection" of 30 profiles and a database of more than 30000 artefacts was added in 2011.

=== Tours ===
The Museum is affiliated with: CMA, CHIN, and Virtual Museum of Canada. The Museum has conducted special events for kids, including an annual Teddy Bear Hospital.

Current details of the Museum's guided tours and education programs can be found on the Museum website.

== See also ==
- Medicine and History of medicine
- List of National Historic Sites of Canada in Kingston, Ontario
