= Fort Henry Guard =

Historical demonstration military unit in Kingston, Ontario

The Fort Henry Guard
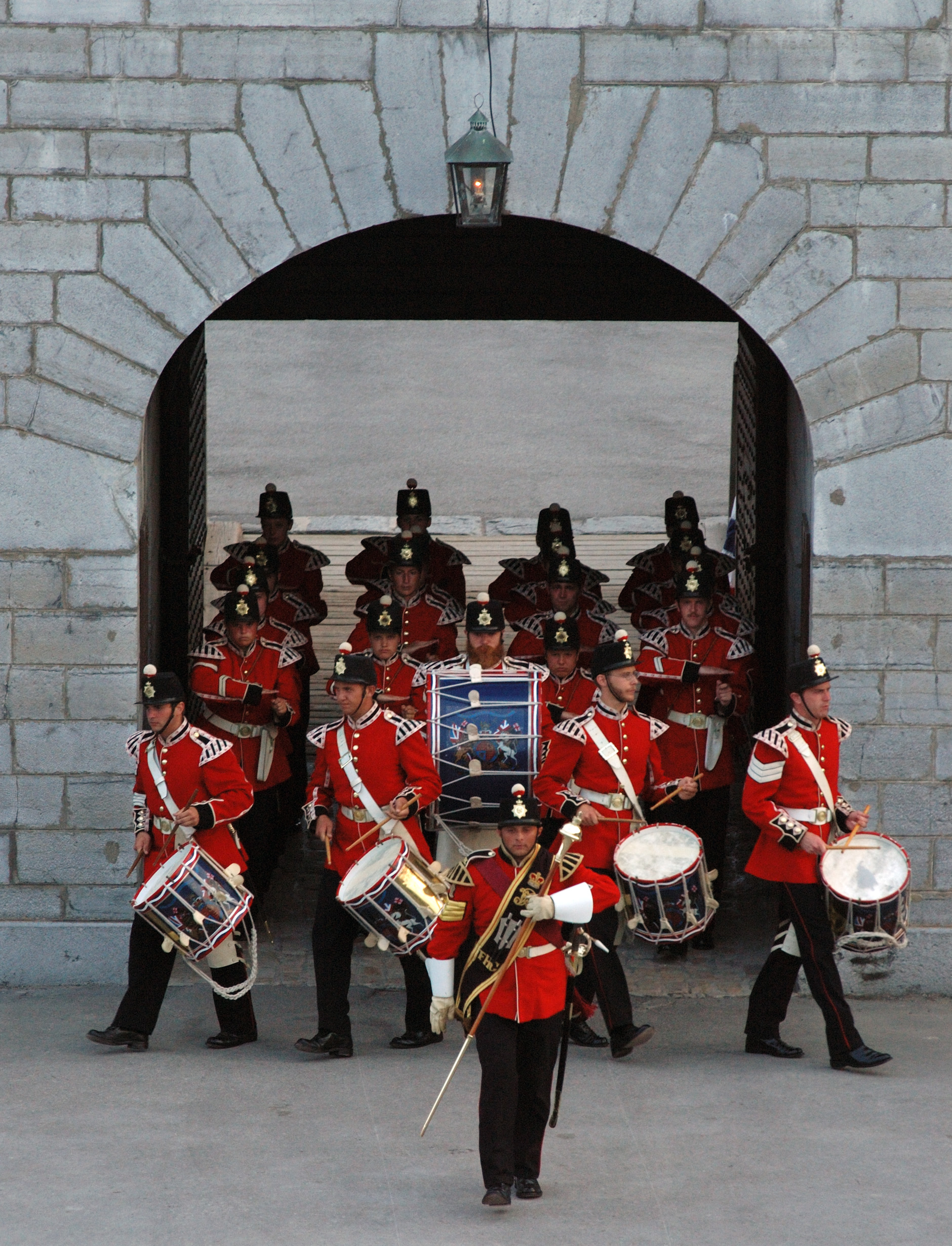
- Fort Henry Guard Drums
- Active: 1938-Present
- Country: Canada
- Branch: Civilian Exhibition Drill
- Type: Line Infantry
- Size: Two Sub-Units
- Garrison/HQ: Fort Henry
- Motto(s): Et Nos Meremur (We also serve)
- March: Quick March: British Grenadiers; Slow March: The Maple Leaf Forever
- Mascot(s): David the XIIth

Commanders
- Honorary Guard Commander: Annette Bergeron

The Fort Henry Guard (FHG) is a historical interpretation and exhibition drill organization based at Fort Henry, a national historic site in Kingston, Ontario, Canada. It has recreated the British military tradition of a bygone era since its founding in 1938. The Guard seeks to interpret in an entertaining and animated manner, a snapshot of life in the British Army of Queen Victoria, when Canada was part of the British Empire. The Guard also practices and performs historic military drill, demonstrated during daily inspections, cannon firings and garrison parades in addition to the weekly Sunset Ceremonies. Guard members dress in the standard line infantry uniforms of a British regiment and the standard gunner's uniforms of the Royal Artillery in the year of 1867, but the Guard does not represent any specific infantry regiment that garrisoned the fort.

The Fort Henry Guard consists primarily of university, college, and high school students from the Kingston area. It is an entirely civilian organization with no formal ties to the Canadian Forces. The Guard performs and provides interpretive programming from May to October.

== History ==
The Fort Henry Guard was founded in 1938 by Ronald L. Way, after Fort Henry was restored as part of a government-sponsored work program during the Great Depression. During the Second World War, the fort was used by the Canadian military as a prisoner of war camp. The Guard ceased to exist during this time, and many of the original members of the Fort Henry Guard served overseas. The fort reopened as a living museum in 1948, and the Fort Henry Guard has manned the fort every summer since.

The Guard has performed at numerous events and ceremonies in Canada and abroad since its founding, most notably the Royal Tournament in England. Performing with the United States Marine Drum and Bugle Corps and Silent Drill Platoon both at their barracks in Washington D.C. and in Fort Henry itself is another famous event in which the Guard has been involved. The Guard also annually performs the 1812 Overture with the Kingston Symphony, uniquely combining music with artillery fire. Elizabeth II, Prince Philip and many other noted visitors from around the world have expressed their appreciation for Fort Henry and the Fort Henry Guard.

The Guard Colours are based on the regulations in effect in 1867 and were presented to the Fort Henry Guard in 1955. They have been carried on parade ever since. The Regimental Colours of the Fort Henry Guard, instead of bearing battle honours, commemorate the 33 British Regiments and 6 Canadian Regiments who have garrisoned Fort Henry.

Although the officers and soldiers of today's Guard superficially represent the regular garrisons of Fort Henry, the connection is seen in the unit's pride, honour, tradition, and esprit de corps. The Guard has its own history and traditions.

== Organization ==
The Guard's most senior non-administrative position is that of the Guard Captain, who oversees all aspects of training and performance throughout the summer. The second most senior position after the Guard Captain is that of the Artillery Lieutenant, who oversees the fort's artillery. There are also two Ensigns whose main duties are to carry the Regimental Colours when parading, instruct new staff about the history of the Fort, manage interpretive programming, and assist in the running of Fort Henry as officer of the day.

The Guard is composed of two sub-units. The Drill Squad, a precision drill team carrying the Snider–Enfield rifle, is led by the Serjeant Major and the Colour Serjeant. The Drums, a precision military marching unit who play fifes, bugles, snare drums and bass drums, are led by the Drum Major and the Drum Serjeant. Other positions within the Guard can include an Adjutant (typically the rank of an Infantry Lieutenant), a Brigade Sergeant Major, who can act as the NCO in charge of the artillery in the absence of a lieutenant, serjeants to assist in artillery and/or interpretation duties, and several junior non-commissioned officers within the two main sub-units who are involved with the training and immediate supervision of the privates. Promotion within the Guard is based on merit and seniority - every Guard Captain in the Fort Henry Guard started as a private. There are also domestic interpreters and a headquarters unit; this is usually composed of pipers, pioneers, and formerly a Goat Major, who was in charge of David XI, a White Saanen Goat who served as the Guard's mascot. All Guard are trained to man the Fort's guns in the uniforms of the Royal Artillery. Members of the Drums subunit typically man the 6-pounder Armstrong guns while in artillery uniform, while the 24-pounder smooth bore muzzle loading guns are typically fired by members of the Drill Squad. Both subunits participate in carronade and mortar firing. While in artillery uniform, members of the Guard may make use of the Snider-Enfield carbine.

== Equipment ==
The Guard is noted for its dedication to historical accuracy and as such the uniforms, while not original, are extremely accurate reproductions. In addition, the Snider-Enfield rifles and carbines used by the Guard are all original to the 1860s. The Guard also fires 24-pounder smooth bore muzzle loading guns, three rifled breech loader 6- and 12-pounder Armstrong guns, 32 pounder carronades, and mortars.

== See also ==
- Fort York Guard
