= Bracken Health Sciences Library =

Library in Ontario, Canada

Coordinates: 44°13′28″N 76°29′30″W

- Type: Queen's University Library Information repository and research resource
- Branches: 2 floors at Botterell Hall
- Criteria for collection: research publications

Other information
- Website: Bracken Health Sciences Library

The Bracken Health Sciences Library at Queen's University in Kingston, Ontario, Canada, occupies two floors of Botterell Hall. It offers complete library services and its staff are committed to excellent user service. The library is open 100 hours per week, with extended exam-study hours towards the end of the semester.

Bracken Health Sciences Library is known for its teaching activities, which include a complete curriculum-integrated information literacy program for medical students and a dedicated e-lab equipped with television monitors, computer projectors, and laptop computers. The courses in this program span all four years of the medical curriculum, and are taught by Bracken librarians.

Bracken Health Sciences Library has networked access to a suite of health sciences databases, including MEDLINE and Evidence-Based Medicine Reviews. Other user services include highly subsidized document delivery for material not available in Kingston, and traditional and electronic reference services. In addition to print journals and books, the library offers around-the-clock electronic access to a large array of full-text journals and books.

== Partnerships and collaboration ==
Bracken Health Sciences Library has established partnerships with a number of community hospitals and health care providers. Queen's University Library is a member of the Association of Research Libraries, Canadian Association of Research Libraries, and the Ontario Council of University Libraries. Queen's University Library is a contributor to the Open Content Alliance.
