= Fort Frederick, U.S. Virgin Islands =

Coordinates: 17°42′55″N 64°52′59″W

Fort Frederick, United States Virgin Islands
- Village
- Interactive map of Fort Frederick, United States Virgin Islands
- Country: United States Virgin Islands
- Island: Saint Croix
- Time zone: UTC-4 (AST)

Fort Frederick is a settlement on the island of Saint Croix in the United States Virgin Islands.
