= Fort Frederick (Vermont) =

Coordinates: 44.4896°N 73.1863°W

Fort Frederick was a formidable blockhouse that was built at the Winooski (then “Onion”) River in 1773 by Ira Allen, one of the first English occupants to settle in the locality. He named it after the ten-year-old Frederick, Duke of York and Albany, second son of George III of the United Kingdom. Allen also established a shipyard nearby at the Winooski River bridge in 1772.

The blockhouse served both as a fort and as a general store and office for the land-speculating “Onion River Company” and was built as a matter of security against the Yorkers and Indians, who at that time were held in equal enmity. Fort Frederick was never used for defense, but its protective presence increased the value of Onion River property and advanced local settlement.

After the American Revolutionary War, Ira Allen returned to build a dam across the Winooski River with a sawmill at each end. That was the start of the use of the Winooski falls to generate energy and continued into the 20th century, with the construction of water-powered mills on both sides of the river.
