= Fort Frederick, South Carolina =

English fort in South Carolina

Coordinates: 32°23′06″N 80°40′41″W

Fort Prince Frederick was the southernmost fort in British North America from 1726 to 1758. Initially constructed of logs, it was later improved with tabby walls, which were completed in 1733. After the founding of Georgia on February 12, 1733 several other forts were constructed farther south, including Fort Frederica on St. Simons Island, diminishing the strategic importance of Fort Frederick. The fort is located in Port Royal, South Carolina.

== Historical Context ==
South Carolina was the southernmost colony in British North America until the founding of Georgia in 1733. Fort Frederick was located near the southern tip of the colony on Port Royal Sound, one of the deepest natural harbors on the east coast of the continent. Control of the sound was essential in the geopolitical context of Spanish claims to the area and French interest in expanding eastward from the Lower Mississippi.

The fort also protected the town of Beaufort, founded in 1711. Beaufort was the second settlement in the Province of Carolina after the founding of its capital, Charles Town (now Charleston) in 1670. Rice production and trade with Native Americans tied to the Atlantic triangular trade had made the region prosperous. The rice plantations of coastal South Carolina (the South Carolina Lowcountry) made Charles Town one of the wealthiest cities in America. Fort Frederick, however, became obsolete with a strong military presence in the Province of Georgia under the command of James Oglethorpe.

== Description ==
The South Carolina Department of Natural Resources provides this description of the fort: A relatively small fort, it measures 125 feet by 75 feet with an obvious bastion on the southwest side. The eastern wall was lined with a battery and cannon. The interior of the fort held a barracks and a magazine and was garrisoned by an independent Company of Foot British Regulars until their transfer to Georgia in 1736.

== Prince Frederick ==
Fort Frederick was named for Frederick, Prince of Wales (1707-1751), son of George II and Queen Caroline. Fort Frederica in Georgia, built in 1736, was also named for Prince Frederick. Frederick was raised in Hanover (now part of Germany) and relocated to England in 1728 only after his father inherited the throne from George I. At the time Fort Frederick was named for him, he was a new presence in Britain's House of Hanover monarchy. By the time Oglethorpe named Fort Frederica after him, he was emerging as a progressive opposition figure within the royal family. The 4th Earl of Shaftesbury (great grandson of the founder of Carolina) and James Oglethorpe were among those affiliated with the opposition country party movement. Lord Bolingbroke envisioned Frederick as a national redeemer in his work, On the Idea of a Patriot King.

== Archaeology at the Site ==
The site was on the grounds of Naval Hospital Beaufort until it was donated to the State of South Carolina in 1997 as part of the National Park Service's Federal-Lands-to-Parks Program. Due to erosion, part of the fort is now under the Beaufort River. The exposed portions of the heavily degraded tabby walls have been protected with a new layer of tabby.

Fort Frederick may be the oldest tabby structure in South Carolina. In 2015, archaeologists investigated the site. Once a full assessment is completed, the site may be opened to the public. "It's wonderful to have this type of history, but when it's behind a fence, then it's difficult to expose people to it," noted Port Royal town manager Van Willis.

== Fort Frederick and the Founding of Georgia ==
In January, 1733 colonists bound for the future colony of Georgia arrived at Fort Frederick. They rested following their trans-Atlantic journey and prepared to establish the new colony at barracks that had just been completed for the fort. Their leader, Georgia Trustee James Oglethorpe, ventured out with South Carolina scouts to the Savannah River, forty miles by water, to select to select a site for Savannah, Georgia's first city.

== Fort Frederick and the Emancipation Proclamation ==
The Emancipation Proclamation was read to the public on a site adjacent Fort Frederick on January 1, 1863. Many people arrived by water for this monumental event, landing at the fort's dock and walking through it to hear the reading. This connection between the event that day and the fort makes the site "hallowed ground" in the estimation of the historian Dr. Lawrence S. Roland.

== See also ==
- Fort Frederick Heritage Preserve
- Province of South Carolina
- Beaufort, South Carolina
- Port Royal, South Carolina
- Port Royal Sound
