= Fort Frederick Heritage Preserve =

Archaeological site in South Carolina, United States

- Fort Frederick
- U.S. National Register of Historic Places
- Location within South Carolina Location within the United States
- Nearest city: Port Royal, South Carolina
- Coordinates: 32°23′4″N 80°40′42″W
- Built: 1734
- NRHP reference No.: 74001826
- Added to NRHP: December 31, 1974

Fort Frederick Heritage Preserve is a 3-acre (12,000 m^{2}) property located in Port Royal, South Carolina. Situated along the Beaufort River, the preserve contains the remains of Fort Frederick. Also known as Fort Prince Frederick, the tabby fort was built by the British between 1730 and 1734 to defend against a possible attack from the Spanish at St. Augustine, Florida. It was named to the National Register of Historic Places in 1974.

The fort, also known as Fort Prince Frederick, is believed to be the oldest tabby structure in the state. Provincial scout boats were stationed here periodically. A relatively small fort, it measures 125 feet by 75 feet with an obvious bastion on the southwest side. The eastern wall was lined with a battery and cannon. The interior of the fort held a barracks and a magazine and was garrisoned by an independent company of British regulars until their transfer to Georgia in 1736.

The preserve is located adjacent to the grounds of the Beaufort Naval Hospital. The preserve is open to the public daily via a passive park established in 2021.
