= Cathcart Tower =

Coordinates: 44°13′31″N 76°27′14″W

- Cedar Island, Kingston, Ontario
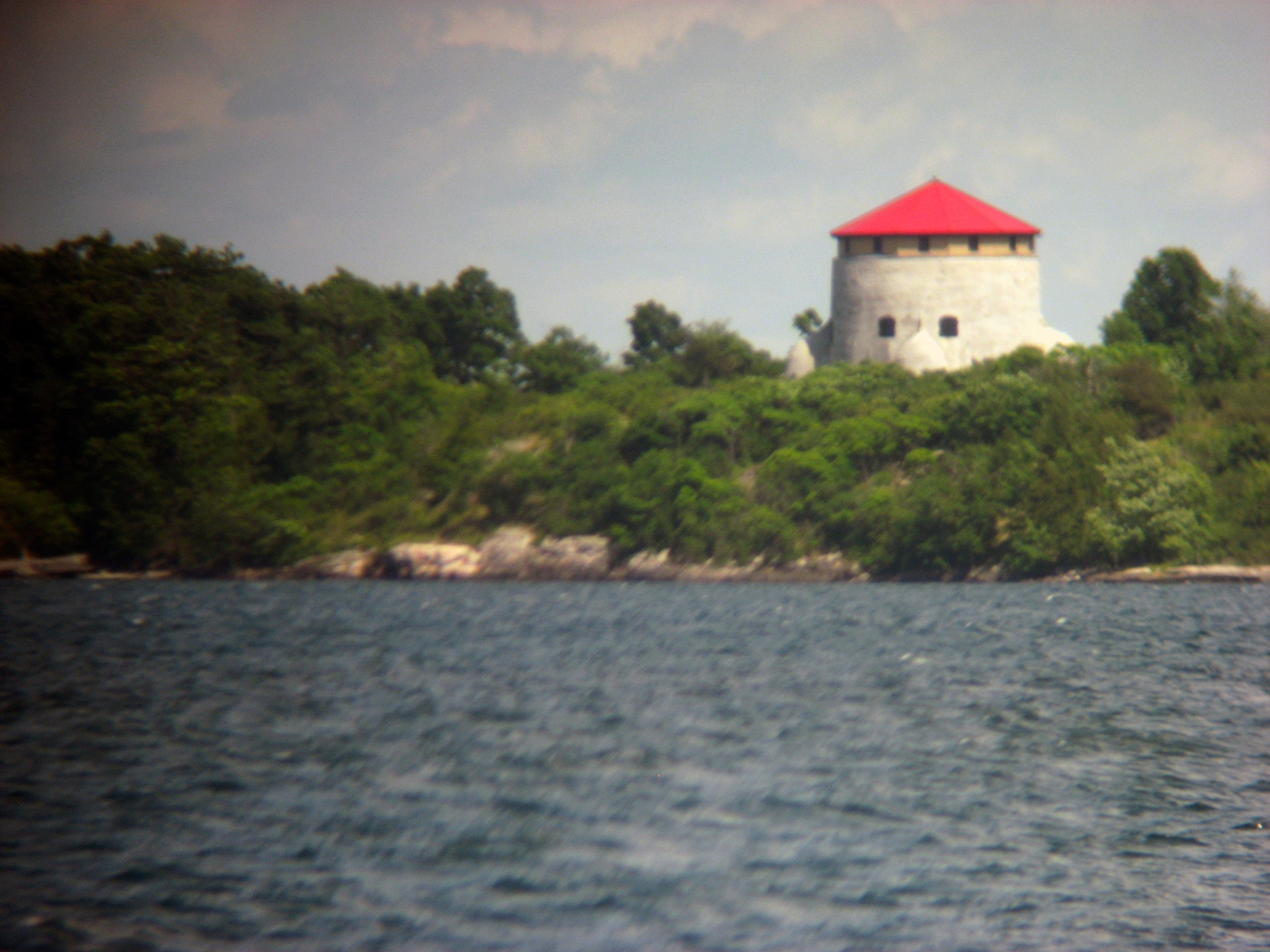

Site information
- Type: Martello tower

Site history
- Built: 1848
- Materials: Local limestone
- Location within Southern Ontario Location within Ontario Location within Canada

UNESCO World Heritage Site
- Official name: Cathcart Tower, Cedar Island
- Part of: Rideau Canal
- Criteria: Cultural: (i)(iv)
- Reference: 1221-004
- Inscription: 2007 (31st Session)
- Area: 0.25 ha (27,000 sq ft)
- Buffer zone: 9.15 ha (985,000 sq ft)

Cathcart Tower is a Martello tower located on Cedar Island in the St. Lawrence River, off the eastern shore of Fort Henry in Kingston, Ontario, Canada. It is one of four such towers built in the 1840s to protect Kingston's harbour and the entrance to the Rideau Canal. The other towers are: Fort Frederick, Shoal Tower, and Murney Tower. Alexander Mackenzie was a foreman on the construction of the Cathcart Tower and later went on to become Canada's second prime minister 1873–1878. It was his work crew whose boat capsized while returning from Cedar Island, drowning 17 men. Hamilton Cove was subsequently renamed Deadman's Bay.

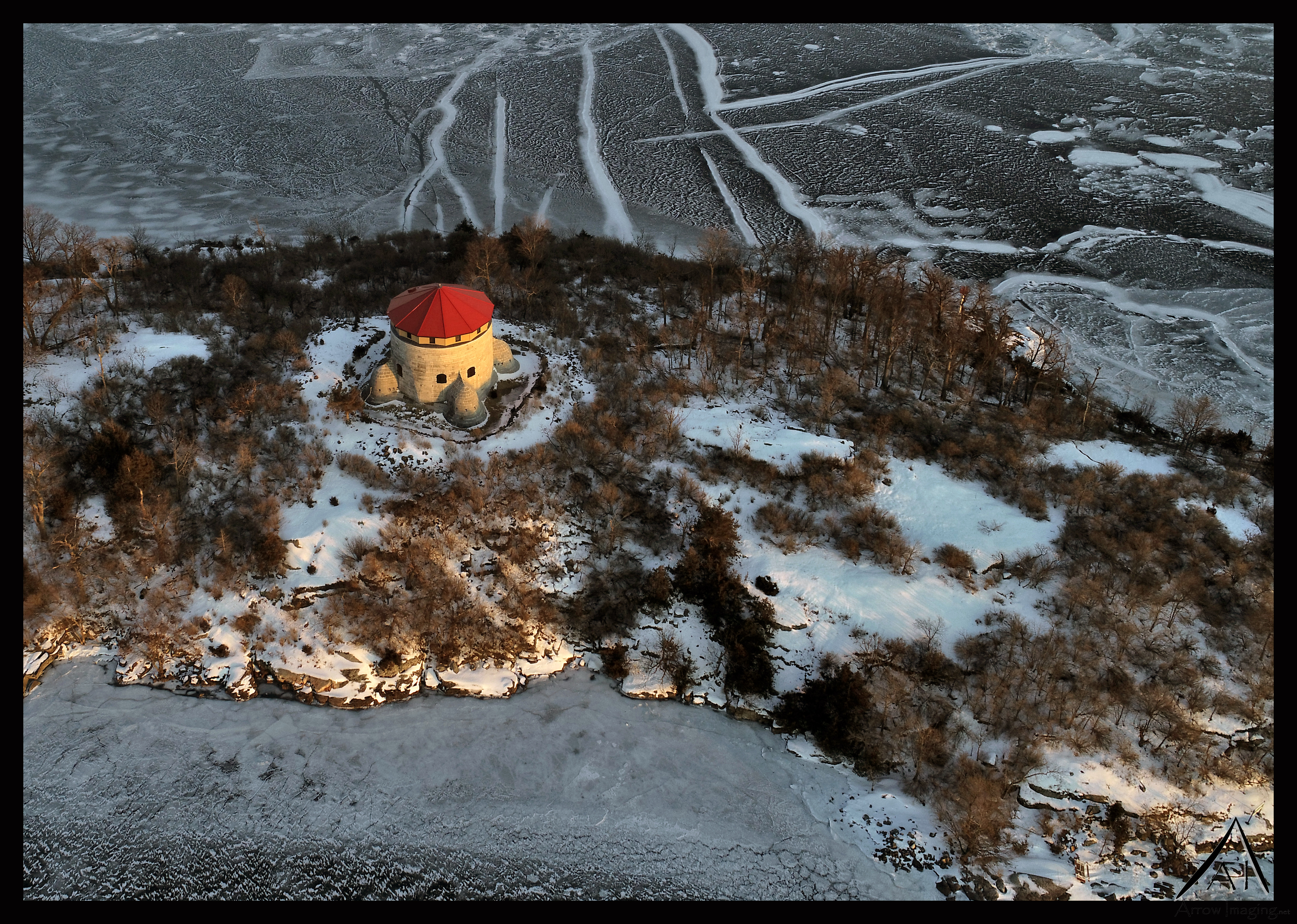
Cathcart Tower Kingston Ontario

Built in 1848, this limestone tower is 11 m high and 16.5 m in diameter. It is surrounded by a shallow ditch and by a glacis extending to the shorelines on three sides. The guns of Cathcart Tower covered the eastern approaches of Kingston Harbour.

The towers' construction was prompted by a dispute between Great Britain and the United States over the boundary between British Columbia and Oregon that threatened to lead to war (see Oregon crisis). When war was averted, Cathcart Tower was used for a time as a barracks for soldiers garrisoned at nearby Fort Henry. Eventually it was abandoned.

The tower is now part of the Rideau Canal and Kingston Fortifications National Historic Site, the Rideau Canal and Kingston Fortifications UNESCO World Heritage Site, and is within the boundaries of Thousand Islands National Park (formerly St. Lawrence Islands National Park).

The tower can be reached by private water craft with docks located on the north and east side of Cedar Island.
