= Murney Tower =

Defensive tower built to protect Kingston, Ontario, from American threats

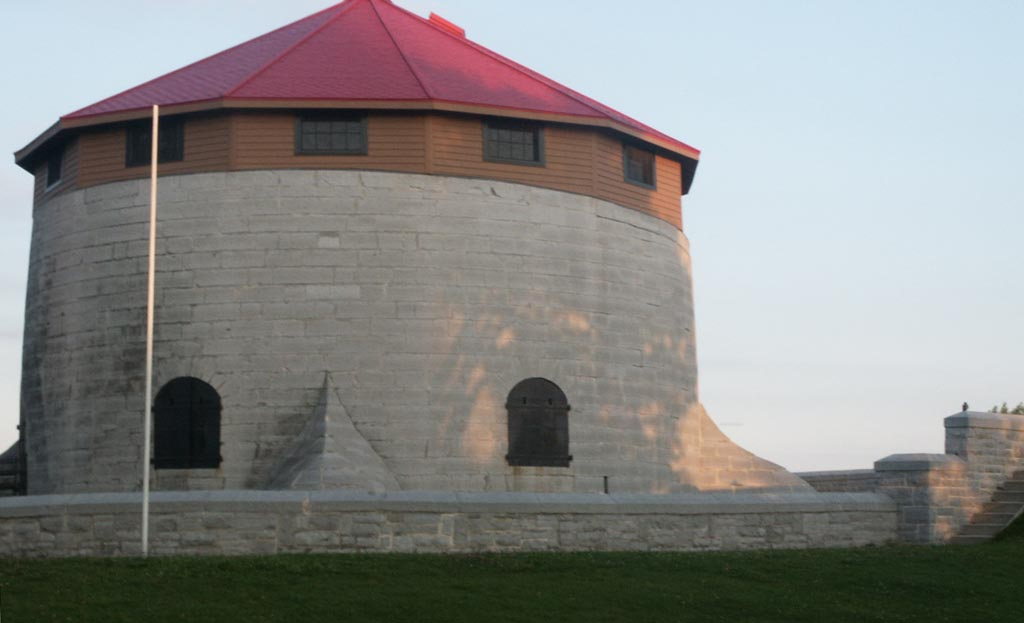
- Established: 1846
- Location: Murney Point, Kingston, Ontario, Canada
- Coordinates: 44°13′20″N 76°29′25.5″W
- Type: Martello tower
- Website: www.kingstonhistoricalsociety.ca/the-murney-tower

UNESCO World Heritage Site
- Official name: Murney Tower, Kingston
- Part of: Rideau Canal
- Criteria: Cultural: (i)(iv)
- Reference: 1221-006
- Inscription: 2007 (31st Session)
- Area: 0.17 ha (18,000 sq ft)
- Buffer zone: 2.71 ha (292,000 sq ft)

National Historic Site of Canada
- Designated: 1930

Murney Tower is a Martello tower in Kingston, Ontario, Canada, whose construction dates to January 1846. The tower was built in response to the Oregon Crisis, which was a tense dispute over the border between British North America and the United States in the 1840s.

The tower is one of five components of Kingston's fortifications that defended Kingston Harbour, the Naval Dockyard, military supply depot and the southern entrance of the Rideau Canal. Murney Tower complements the fortifications of Fort Henry, Ontario; Cathcart Tower on Cedar Island; Shoal Tower in the Confederation Basin; and Fort Frederick on the grounds of the Royal Military College of Canada. In addition to protecting the harbour and approaches to Kingston, these fortifications were designed to concentrate fire on Gardiners Island, it being the only place to effectively land artillery at the time.

== History ==
=== Background ===
When the tower was first constructed they planned to call it Murray Tower after the Master General of Ordnance. The land however, was owned by the Murney family and was called Murney Point by the locals. They thus began calling the tower, Murney Tower. This name stuck. The original inscription stone above the door read "Murray Tower". An "N" was affixed over the first "R" so that the current sign reads "MURNAY TOWER", a hybrid spelling of the two versions.

Construction began on the tower on February 7, 1846. On June 15 of the same year the Oregon treaty was resolved, reducing tensions with the Americans. On June 19, the walls were built to their full height. Construction of the tower was finished on November 10, 1846.

=== Life in the tower ===
The tower was occupied from 1848 until 1885. The main floor (ground level) was the barracks level where the soldiers and their families lived, ate, and slept. It was manned by the Royal Canadian Rifle Regiment until 1870, then by Battery A until 1880, and Battery B until 1884. After 1885 it was watched by the Princess of Wales Own Regiment. It could house a maximum of 24 soldiers and one officer or multiple soldiers and their families.

A birth was recorded in the tower in 1882. Sergeant Thomas Pugh and his wife Martha Mary lived in the tower with their seven children: William, Thomas, James, Murney May, Lillian, Bertha, and Sydney. Murney May Pugh was born in May while her family was living in the tower. She eventually left Kingston to become a nurse and served overseas in the First World War. The Pugh family have had a significant impact on Kingston and Canada's history, serving over 470 years in the military.

== Architecture and defenses ==
The tower stands surrounded by a dry-ditch and is accessible only by a bridge. When the tower was originally built, there was no bridge to cross the dry-ditch. It is likely that soldiers would have accessed the tower through two ladders placed in the ditch. Murney Tower was constructed with locally quarried limestone with special brickwork on the barracks and basement levels of the tower's interior. On the thickest side the walls are about 15 ft (4.6 m) thick at the base and 13 ft (4.0 m) thick up top. On the weaker side the walls are about 8 ft (2.4 m) thick. The walls are thicker on the south side because a naval attack from the Americans was the most likely form of attack and thus is what the tower is prepared for. Cannonballs from enemy ships should have theoretically bounced right off the walls.

Currently, the barracks has two internal carronade cannons that would have fired 32-pound (15 kg) cannonballs directed out shuttered windows. These carronades had a range of 400 metres (1,300 ft) and would have been used for anti-personnel warfare in case of a land attack. These cannons could be moved about the interior embrasures, and so cover multiple approaches, including the bridge.

The lower floor contained the ventilated gunpowder and artillery magazines and storage rooms, along with four caponiers, which acted as a defense system for the dry-ditch surrounding the tower, allowing soldiers to fire through small loopholes at troops attacking the tower's base. Caponiers were unique to the Kingston Martello Towers, due to controversy surrounding them. The walls are much thinner in the caponier than in the rest of the tower and are thus more vulnerable to attack. However, they also provided troops with the opportunity to protect the dry ditch through rifle loops, with strategic additional doors and rifle holes meant to keep out any enemy who successfully breached the caponier.

The uppermost level is the artillery or gun platform, which supports a Blomefield cannon (which also fired 32-pound (15 kg) cannonballs) that could be rotated along an iron track, thus providing full coverage around the tower's entire circumference. The Blomefield cannon was redesigned by Thomas Blomefield, Inspector of Artillery and Superintendent of the Royal Brass Foundry in 1780. Blomefield redesigned the Armstrong cannon that had been previously used by the British forces, replacing it with a cannon that was simpler in design, lighter, and had more effective recoil restraint. The cannon weighs 6,429 lb (2,916 kg), with a range of 2,000 metres (6,600 ft).

Roofs are not original Mediterranean design of Martello towers, but a temporary snow roof added to the open gun platform two years after the tower's construction protects the gun and keeps out the large amounts of snow. The addition of a roof is a common feature on Canadian Martellos. The original roof was installed in 1849. In 1921 a windstorm removed the original wooden and tin roof. Parts of the roof date to the reconstruction that followed in 1925, but the majority of the present roof dates from the 1970s and is not removable for safety reasons. Despite being one of the most sophisticated Martello towers designed and built by the British, Murney Tower quickly became obsolete due to improvements made in military weaponry and ship design.

== Present day ==
In 1925, the museum was opened as a museum for the public by the Kingston Historical Society. It continues to be operated by the Kingston Historical Society as the Murney Tower Museum through the summer months (May through Labour Day in September). Displays include three cannons (32-pounder), period uniforms, muskets, and other mid-19th-century military artifacts.

Although 14 Martello towers were built in Canada, only nine are still standing, four of them in Kingston. Currently, only Murney Tower Museum is open to the public. Fort Henry has two towers that resemble Martello towers; however, they are branch ditch towers.

=== Designations ===
In 1930 Murney Tower was designated a national historic site due to its sophisticated design.

In 1989 the Kingston Fortifications were designated a National Historic Site of Canada.

In 2007, the Rideau Canal and Kingston Fortifications (including Murney Tower) were recognized as a UNESCO World Heritage Site. It was recognized as having played an important role in the defense of British North America and in enabling Canada to develop its own political and cultural identity.
