= Shoal Tower =

- Confederation Basin, Kingston, Ontario Canada.
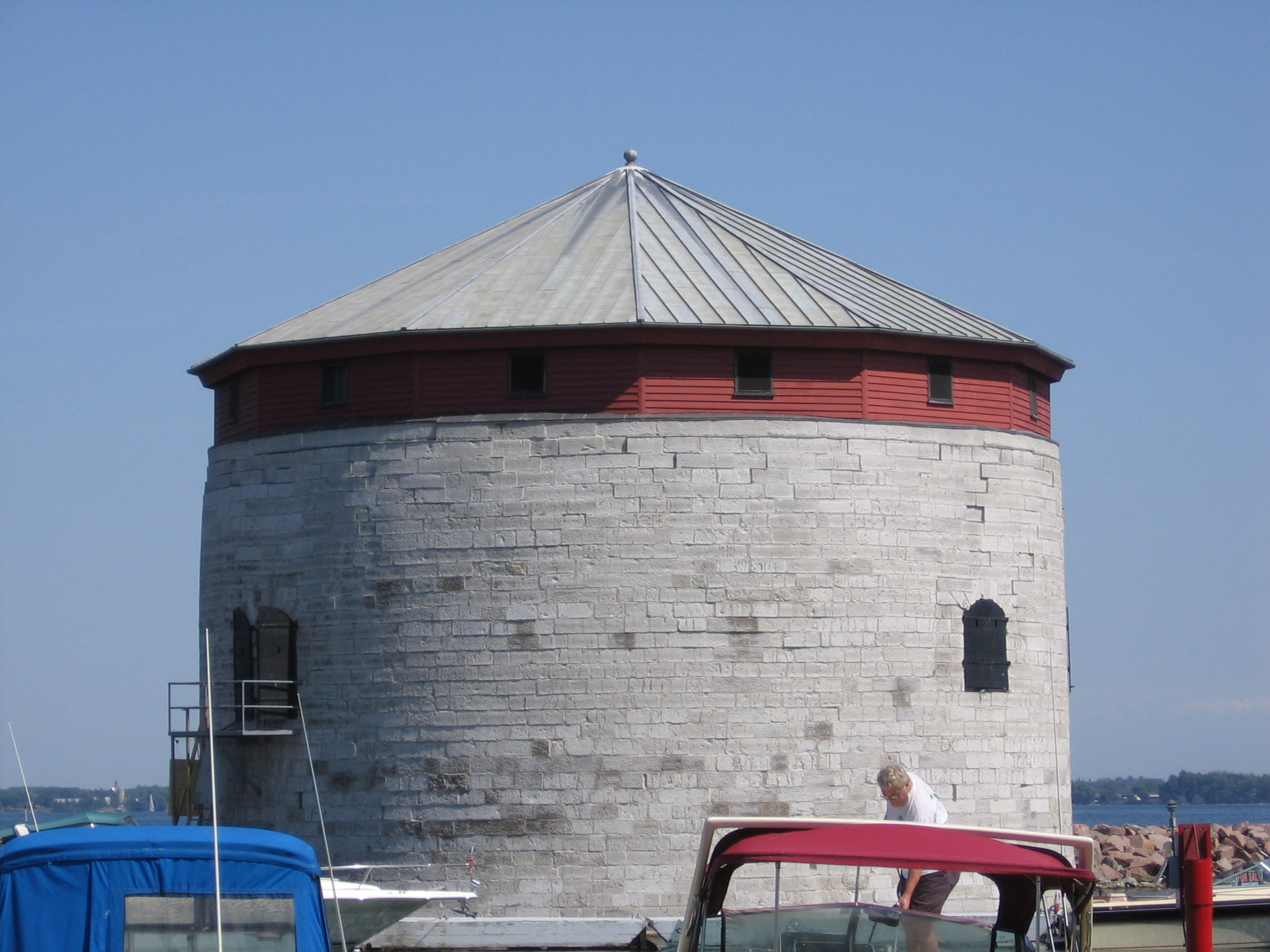
- Shoal Tower

Site information
- Type: Martello tower

Site history
- Built: 1847
- Materials: Local limestone
- Location within Southern Ontario Location within Ontario Location within Canada

UNESCO World Heritage Site
- Official name: Shoal Tower, Kingston
- Part of: Rideau Canal
- Criteria: Cultural: (i)(iv)
- Reference: 1221-005
- Inscription: 2007 (31st Session)
- Area: 0.32 ha (34,000 sq ft)
- Buffer zone: 1.68 ha (181,000 sq ft)
- Coordinates: 44°13′43.5″N 76°28′41.5″W

Shoal Tower, originally known as Victoria Tower, is a Martello tower located in the harbour (Confederation Basin) of Kingston, Ontario, Canada, directly opposite Kingston City Hall. It is one of four such towers built in the 1840s to protect Kingston's harbour and the entrance to the Rideau Canal. Cathcart Tower on Cedar Island, Shoal Tower in the Confederation Basin, Fort Frederick on the grounds of the Royal Military College of Canada, and Murney Tower were part of the same strategic improvements. Although 16 Martello towers were built in Canada, only 11 are still standing, four of them in Kingston.

Built in 1847, this limestone tower is 11 m high and 16.5 m in diameter. The guns of Shoal Tower defended the approaches of Kingston Harbour. A dispute between Great Britain and the United States over the boundary between British Columbia and Oregon that threatened to lead to war and to the invasion of Canada (see Oregon crisis) prompted their construction. Eventually Shoal Tower was abandoned.

It was designated a National Historic Site of Canada in 1930, and is part of the Kingston Fortifications National Historic Site.
