= Kingston General Hospital =

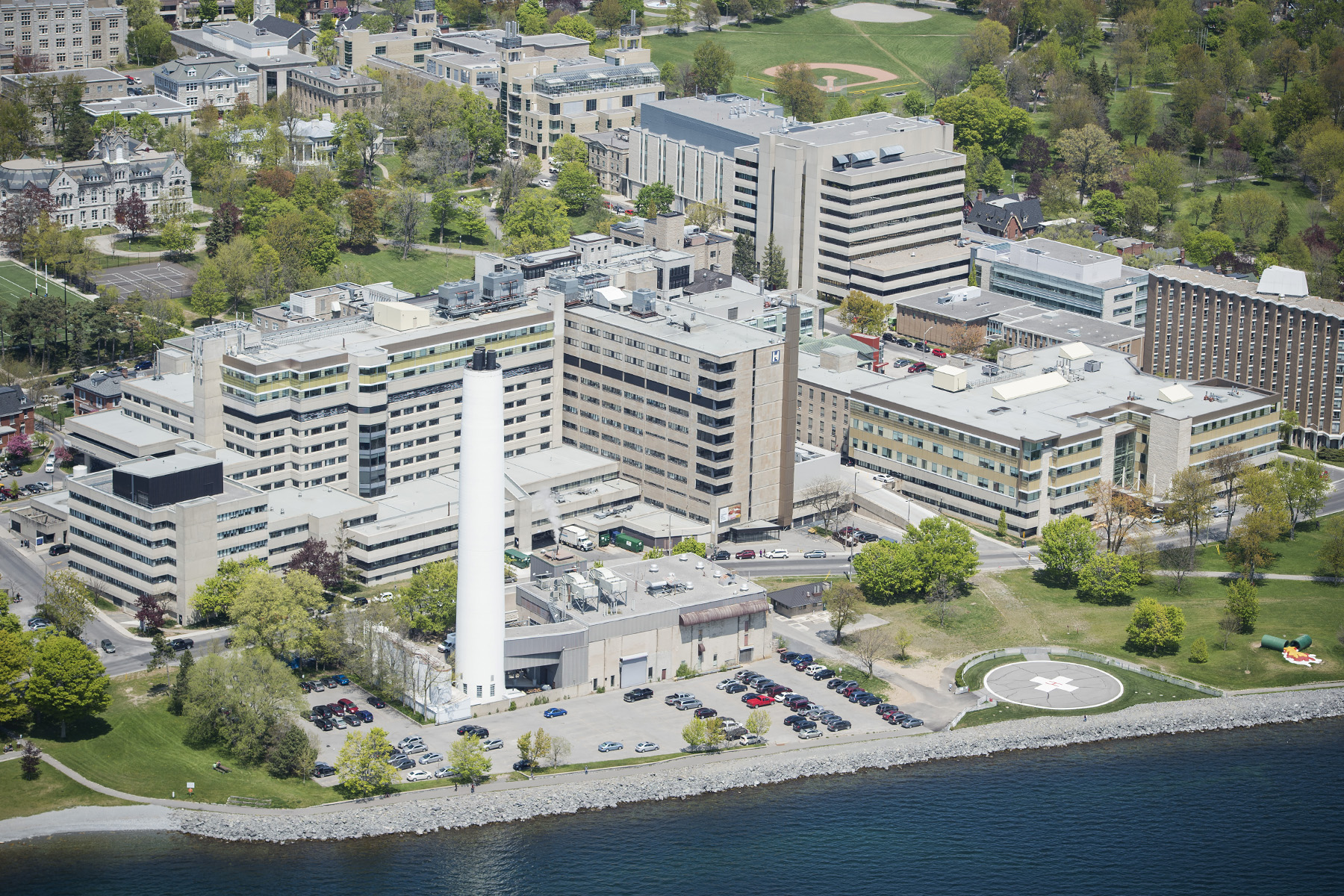

- Location in Ontario

Geography
- Location: 76 Stuart Street, Kingston, Ontario, Canada
- Coordinates: 44°13′27″N 076°29′35″W

Organization
- Care system: Public Medicare (OHIP)
- Type: Acute care
- Affiliated university: Queen's School of Medicine

Services
- Emergency department: Yes, Level II Trauma Centre
- Beds: 500+

Helipads
- Helipad: TC LID: CPJ7

History
- Founded: 1835

Links
- Website: http://www.kingstonhsc.ca
- Lists: Hospitals in Canada

The Kingston General Hospital (KGH) site is an acute-care teaching hospital affiliated with Queen's University located in Kingston, Ontario, Canada. Along with the Hotel Dieu Hospital (HDH) site, these hospitals form Kingston Health Sciences Centre which delivers health care services to more than 500,000 residents throughout southeastern Ontario; conducts health care research and trains future health care professionals.

The KGH site is the oldest public hospital in Canada still in operation with most of its buildings are intact. Architecturally reflecting the evolution of health care in the 19th and 20th centuries, the KGH site was designated a National Historic Site of Canada in 1995.

== History ==
=== 19th century ===
In 1832 an Act of Parliament named a commission to "superintend and manage the erection and completion of a hospital in or near the town of Kingston". In 1835 the first building was completed on the site where KGH stands today, on land purchased from Archdeacon George O'Kill Stuart. The building, designed to accommodate 72 patients, remained unoccupied until three years later when the city had the money to purchase equipment and furnishings. In 1838 the hospital briefly housed its first patients, twenty wounded Americans taken prisoner in the Battle of the Windmill during the Rebellion of 1837.

When Kingston was named the capital of the Province of Canada in 1841 and the United Provinces required an unoccupied building to serve as the first house of Parliament, the hospital was chosen. Parliament met in the hospital from the time of the Union of the Provinces of Upper and Lower Canada from 1841 until 1844 when the capital and parliament were moved to Montreal. In 1845, the building was returned to its original purpose and, thanks to the Female Benevolent Society, began its seasonal operation as a charitable institution.

The hospital grounds also holds the remains of approximately 1,400 Irish immigrants who had died in Kingston in fever sheds along the waterfront, during the typhus epidemic of 1847, while fleeing the Great Famine. While some of the remains were re-interred to the city's St. Mary's Cemetery in 1966, work to relocate the vast majority of the remains began in August 2021.

Initial resident staff included a housekeeper-nurse and an assistant. In time, a house surgeon and caretaker also lived on site. The Female Benevolent Society provided volunteers while local doctors took turns offering their services free-of-charge. The hospital cared mainly for the poor, many of them recent immigrants, until the 20th century. The hospital's affiliation with the Queen's School of Medicine began in 1854. A much-needed addition to the main building and funded by local businessman John Watkins, the Watkins Wing opened in January 1863 to treat patients with infectious diseases. Recognizing the value of professionally trained nurses, surgeon Kenneth Fenwick was instrumental in convincing the board to establish an in-house training program for nurses in 1886. The hospital recognized the importance of isolating patients with infectious disease when the Nickle Wing was built. Named after local businessman and benefactor William Nickle, the Nickle Wing opened in 1891. Then, in view of the increasing number of maternity patients and their particular needs, the hospital board proposed a new building for women. A bequest from the estate of foundry-owner Michael Doran provided for the Doran Building, which began admitting patients in 1894. The 19th century discovery of ether and chloroform and their potential for eliminating pain and suffering during surgery along with the importance of antisepsis led to the construction of appropriate facilities for surgery. In 1892 at the Kingston Hospital, surgeon Kenneth Fenwick offered to fund the construction of a surgical amphitheatre which was completed and in operation by 1895.

=== 20th century ===
The board approved construction of a nurses' home in response to the expanding role of nursing and the success of the nursing school. The Nurses' Home (later named after Ann Baillie) opened in 1904. Formalizing the role of the community's volunteer women, the hospital's Women's Aid was founded in 1905 and within a year had 110 members. This organization, now known as the KGH Auxiliary, was one of the first of its kind in Ontario. Almost immediately, the women began to raise funds for the hospital. Their efforts contributed to funding the Empire Wing in 1914 which was built to provide additional private accommodation for paying patients. Although the hospital continued to serve as a charitable institution, an increasing number of paying patients reflected the growing acceptance of the hospital by community members who traditionally received health care at home.

In 1924, Kingston General Hospital suffered from a number of personnel and management problems. Based on the recommendation of Dr. Horace Brittain, the hospital's Board of Governors decided to appoint someone with an administrative rather than medical background to run the hospital. In March 1925, civil engineer R. Fraser Armstrong was appointed superintendent of KGH, a position he kept until 1957. As the need for diagnostic services increased, a long fund-raising campaign resulted in construction of the Richardson Laboratories and the Douglas Wing in 1925. During the Great Depression, Armstrong developed the Community Cooperative Group Hospital Plan, Ontario's first public health insurance plan.

In 1932, the entire hospital staff donated five percent of their salaries to the hospital to help offset rate reductions caused by the Depression. 1947, the Victory Wing was completed. Beds were reserved for patients from Veterans Affairs Canada. Victory also housed clinical facilities for the Ontario Cancer Foundation.

Another lengthy fund-raising campaign resulted in construction of the Angada Children's Hospital which opened in 1953. The hospital chose the name Angada - an Arabic word meaning "to bring help unto you"- in recognition of generous financial support from the Shriners.

In 1960, the hospital built the Walter T. Connell Wing, named after the longtime head of the Department of Medicine at KGH and Queen's University.

Two more floors were added to the Connell Wing in 1970. The Fraser Armstrong Patient Centre, which offered a range of outpatient clinics, opened its doors in 1975. An emergency department followed in 1976. In 1977, the Ronald C. Burr Wing opened with facilities for regional rehabilitation.

In 1981, the T. Ashmore Kidd Wing opened with a new operating room, medical records and radiology facilities. Three years later, renovations made way for new facilities including laboratories, ophthalmology, prosthetics, endoscopy, renal unit and a pulmonary function lab; space for the KGH Auxiliary was also added.

Named after a prominent Kingston couple known for their contributions to the community (and beyond), the Syl and Molly Apps Medical Research Centre opened in 1987. The Kidd/Davies Patient Tower and new main entrance made their debut in 1989.

Among the services available in the new wing were a neonatal intensive-care unit, a renal unit and cardiac services. New magnetic resonance imaging (MRI) equipment was installed at KGH in 1994, making Kingston one of Ontario's regional diagnostic imaging centres. Major renovations to floors 9 and 10 of the hospital's Connell Wing were completed in 1995. The Same Day Admission Centre was built on Dietary 2 in 1997. Major renovations to the Emergency Services area were completed in 1998.

=== 21st century ===
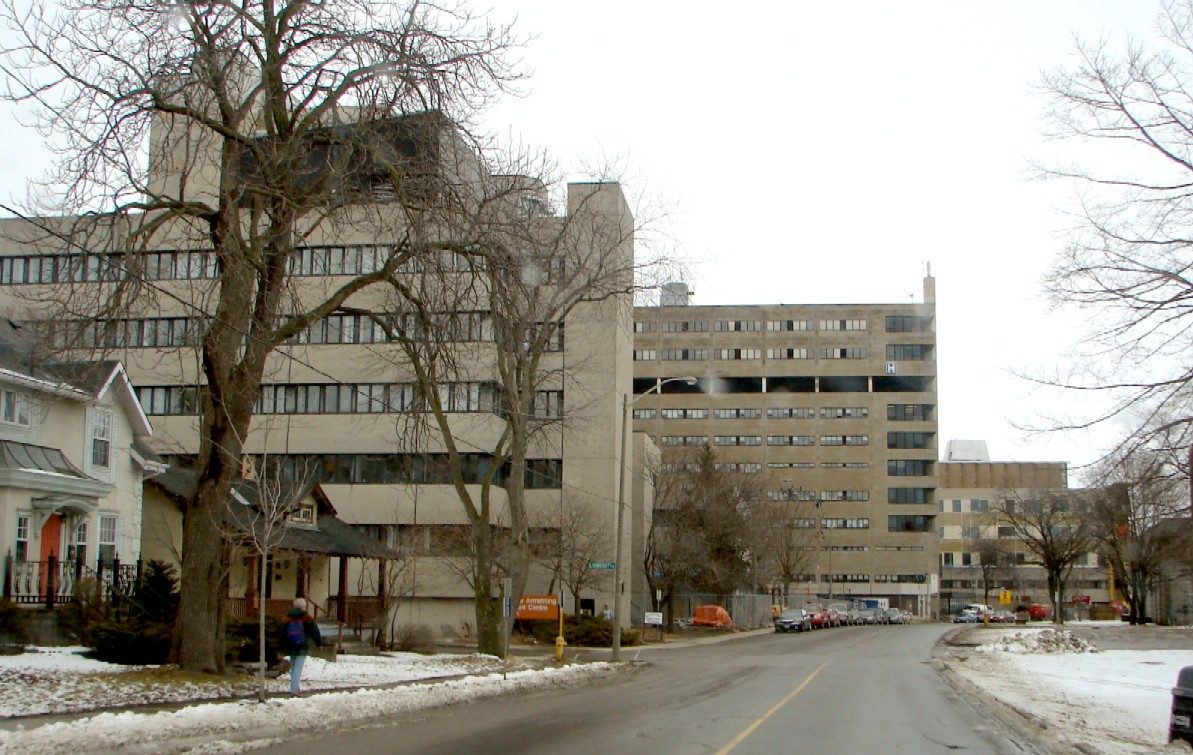
Kingston General Hospital, 2010

Major renovations to the Syl and Molly Apps wing were undertaken in 2002. Sections D&E of the emergency department were renovated and opened in 2003. The Kingston Regional Cancer Centre integrated with KGH and became the Cancer Care South East at KGH in 2004. The Centre for Advanced Urological Research opened at 62 Barrie Street in 2005. A replacement MRI machine was installed in 2005. In 2009, two new floors were added to the Kidd Wing, and a major expansion of the Cancer Centre in the Burr Wing has recently been completed. Outpatient clinics were transferred to Hotel Dieu Hospital as KGH consolidated as the tertiary (acute care) hospital for the Southeast LHIN.

2008 marked a change in direction for the hospital when patient and family-centred care became a focus. As one of the first hospitals in Canada to embrace patient and family-centred care, KGH attracted media attention and several awards.

Launched in 2010, the Kingston General Hospital Research Institute (KGHRI) has a mission to create and advance knowledge that brings evidence into practice for the benefit and empowerment of patients, families and the medical community. The institute is affiliated with a number of other Kingston-based hospitals and the Faculty of Health Sciences at Queen's University, which together receive over $80 million per year in external research funding.

The Research Institute is currently developing the W.J. Henderson Centre, a new 12,000 square foot clinical research space to house a multi-disciplinary hub that brings together scientists, treatment teams, patients and families. The centre will feature modular labs that can be shared by several research teams, as well as patient-friendly observation areas for overnight studies and clinical trials.

In April, 2017, Kingston General Hospital and Hotel Dieu Hospital were integrated together into a corporation known as Kingston Health Sciences Centre. Dr. David Pichora, the new President and CEO said, "Together, our two hospitals will be able to make the most of our shared resources to deliver better access to care and provide our communities a broader range of services close to home."

In 2017, a Canadian-first medical innovation, the hybrid ablation treatment of atrial fibrillation, was performed at Kingston Health Sciences Centre and Queen's University by a multidisciplinary team of cardiac surgeons (Dr. Gianluigi Bisleri) and cardiologists (Dr. Benedict Glover).

== Services ==
- Cardiac care
- Critical care
- Emergency care
- Sexual assault / domestic violence
- Mental health
- Nephrology
- Oncology
- Pediatrics
- Obstetrics and gynaecology
- Pathology and molecular medicine
- Surgery, perioperative, and anesthesiology
- Acute General Internal Medicine
- Neurosurgery
- KHSC@Home| Home care services

=== Clinics ===
- Cardiac Rhythm Device
- Diagnostic radiology
- EEG
- Endocrinology and Metabolism
- Gastroenterology
- Infection control
- Regional Stroke Program
- Rheumatology
- Sleep lab

== Heliport ==
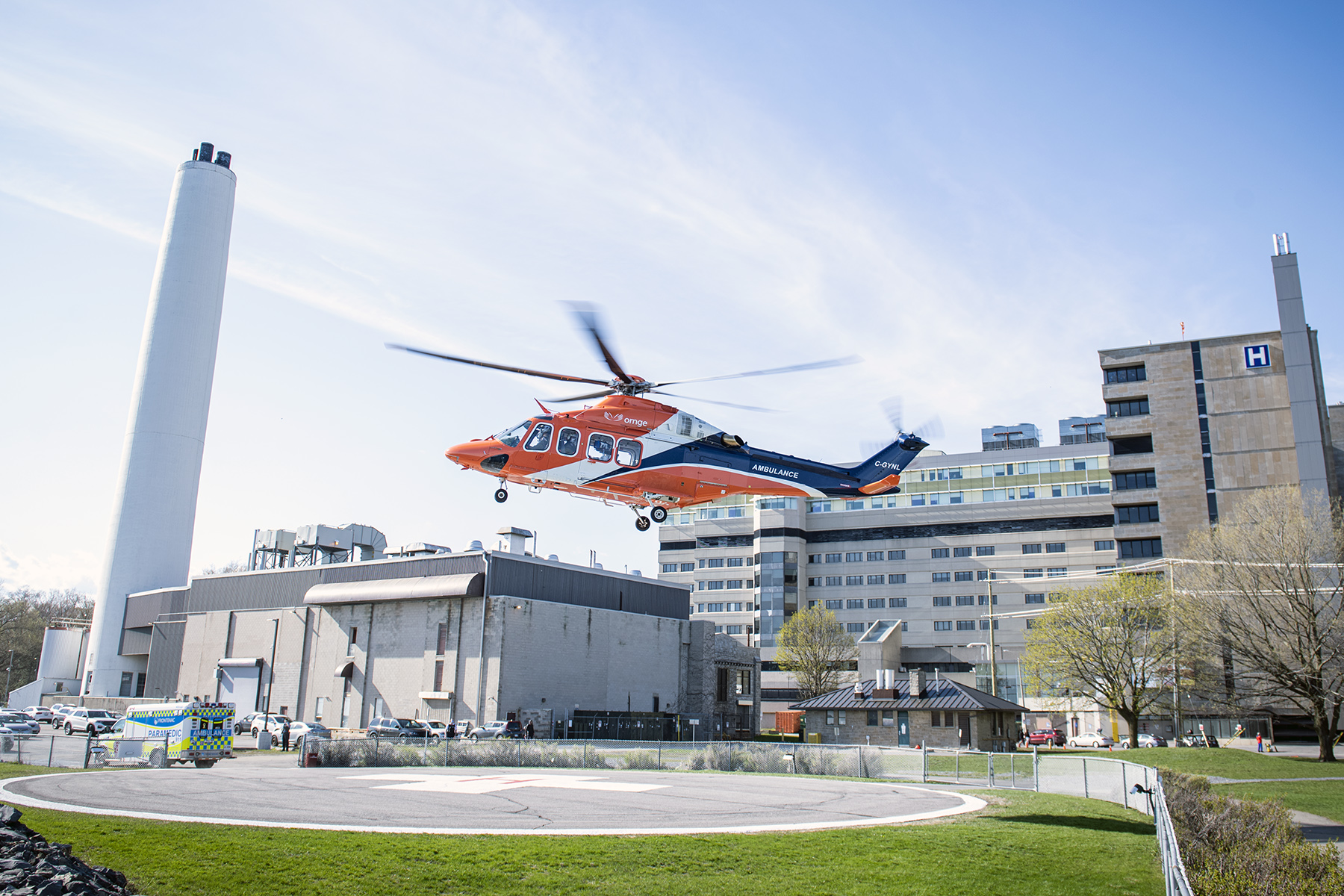
An Ornge air ambulance landing at the Kingston General Hospital site of Kingston Health Sciences Centre in Kingston Ontario Canada.

The heliport is located on ground level and on the south side of King Street West facing the waterfront. This requires ambulance transfer from the pad to the hospital building on the north side of King Street.

== See also ==
- Hotel Dieu Hospital site
- Providence Care Hospital
- Museum of Health Care

Preceded by none	Site of the Legislative Assembly of the United Provinces of Canada; 1841–1843	Succeeded by St. Anne's Market (Marche Sainte-Anne) - now Place d'Youville, Montreal
