= Fort Frederick (Kingston, Ontario) =

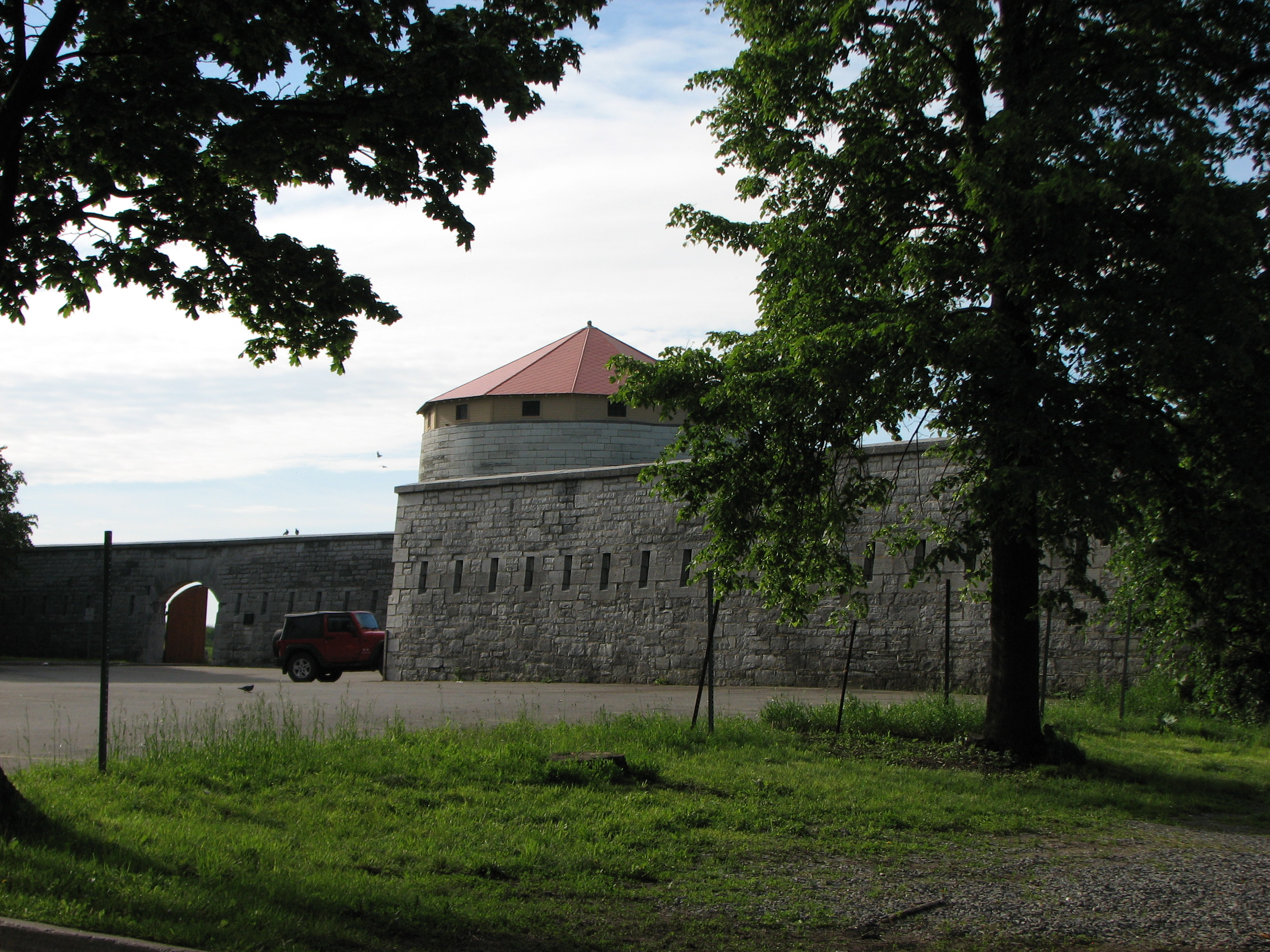
- Location: Kingston, Ontario, Canada
- Coordinates: 44°13′40″N 76°28′10″W
- Type: earthworks surrounding a Martello tower.
- Curator: Ross McKenzie
- Website: www.rmc-cmr.ca/en/museum/rmc-museum

UNESCO World Heritage Site
- Official name: Fort Frederick, Kingston
- Part of: Rideau Canal
- Criteria: Cultural: (i)(iv)
- Reference: 1221-003
- Inscription: 2007 (31st Session)
- Area: 3.1 ha (330,000 sq ft)
- Buffer zone: 3 ha (320,000 sq ft)

Fort Frederick is a historic military building located on Point Frederick on the grounds of the Royal Military College of Canada (RMC) in Kingston, Ontario, Canada. Its construction dates to 1846 and the Oregon boundary dispute. The fort consists of earthworks surrounding a Martello tower. Fort Frederick is included in two separate National Historic Sites of Canada: the Kingston Fortifications National Historic Site and the Point Frederick Buildings National Historic Site.

== History ==
Fort Frederick was built on the south end of Point Frederick, the site of the Kingston Royal Naval Dockyard. The point and fort were named after Frederick, Prince of Wales. The original fort, consisting of earthworks, was built during the War of 1812 for protection against naval attack. On November 10, 1812, the Fort Frederick battery took part in the Battle of Kingston Harbour, repulsing an American naval squadron under Commodore Isaac Chauncey.

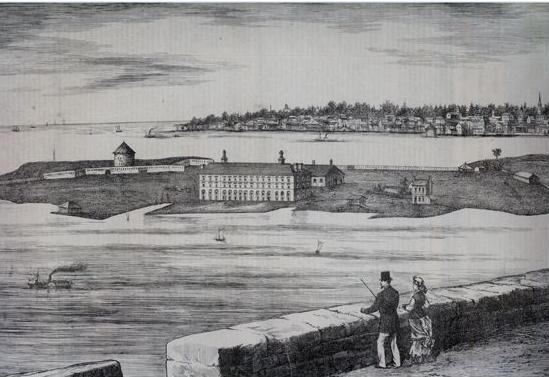
Fort Frederick c. 1874

Four stone Martello towers were built to strengthen Kingston's defences in 1846 during the Oregon boundary dispute between the United States and Britain. The towers were meant to protect the shipyard and the entrances to the Rideau Canal and St. Lawrence River, from possible United States aggression. Fort Frederick contains one of these towers, built on the site of the original fort; the tower houses the RMC Museum. The three other towers were Cathcart Tower, Murney Tower, and Shoal Tower. Fort Frederick was abandoned in 1870.

Alexander Mackenzie was a foreman on the construction of the Fort Frederick Martello Tower and later went on to become Canada's second prime minister. While on an unannounced trip to Fort Frederick to look for a possible site for a new military college, Prime Minister Mackenzie asked the then commandant, Colonel de la C.T. Irwin, if he knew the thickness of the outside wall. When the surprised commandant could not answer, Prime Minister Mackenzie said "It's 5 feet 6 inches, I know for I built it myself!".

While Archibald Macdonnell was Commandant of RMC, between 1909 and 1919, the upper floors of Fort Frederick were used as a common room. After the seniors rolled cannonballs down the common room stairs, the floor was reallocated as a recruit haven. The college's class of 1931 gifted Fort Frederick with wooden gates and a plaque in 1971 in remembrance of the days when Fort Frederick was a recruit refuge.

== Legacy ==
On 28 June 1985 Canada Post issued 'Fort Frederick, Ont.' one of the 20 stamps in the "Forts Across Canada Series" (1983 and 1985). The stamps are perforated 12 1/2 x 13 and were printed by Ashton-Potter Limited based on the designs by Rolf P. Harder.

== Affiliations ==
The Museum is affiliated with: CMA, CHIN, and Virtual Museum of Canada.

== See also ==
- List of forts
- List of National Historic Sites of Canada in Kingston, Ontario
- Royal eponyms in Canada
