= Pemzashen Church =

7th-century Armenian church

Pemzashen Church Պեմզաշեն եկեղեցի
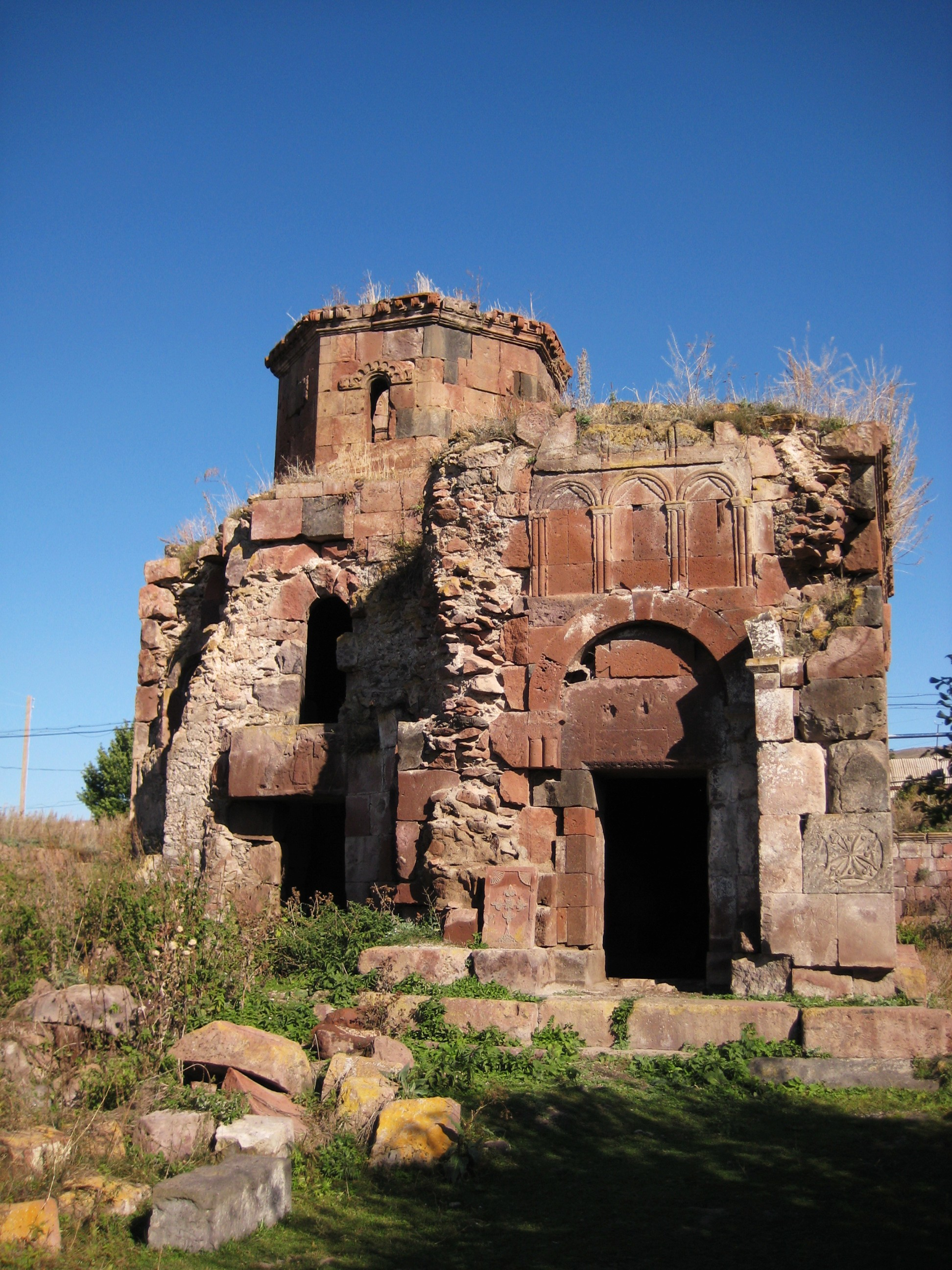
- Pemzashen Church, October 2009.

- Location within Armenia Location within Shirak

Religion
- Affiliation: Armenian Apostolic Church
- Status: Ruins

Location
- Location: Pemzashen village, Shirak Province, Armenia
- Coordinates: 40.5933°N 43.9400°E

Architecture
- Style: Armenian
- Completed: 7th century, adjacent to 5th-century basilica foundations.

Pemzashen Church (Armenian: Պեմզաշեն եկեղեցի) of the 7th century is located within the village of Pemzashen in the Shirak Province of Armenia just off the main road through town. It sits adjacent to the foundations of a 5th-century basilica.

== Architecture ==
The church at Pemzashen has a small cruciform central-plan with a single intact octagonal drum above. Four small windows are located around the drum. The dome that once stood above has since collapsed, but the geometric cornice directly under where it stood is still intact. A side chapel is attached to the main church with a separate entry directly adjacent to the main portal to the church. Upon the lintel to the main entry to the church is a carving of the Virgin Mary holding the baby Jesus in her arms, and an angel to either side descending to Mary with child holding a cloth in their arms. Mary is flanked by two other figures with gifts in their hands. The angel and figure to the right have been defaced almost completely except for the angel's cloth, and the faces of all of the remaining figures have been defaced as well except for the figure standing to the right. The rear façades of the church and chapel are partially in ruin, and at one time there had been other rooms attached to the front façade of the structure, as is evident from the remnants of collapsed walls.

== Gallery ==
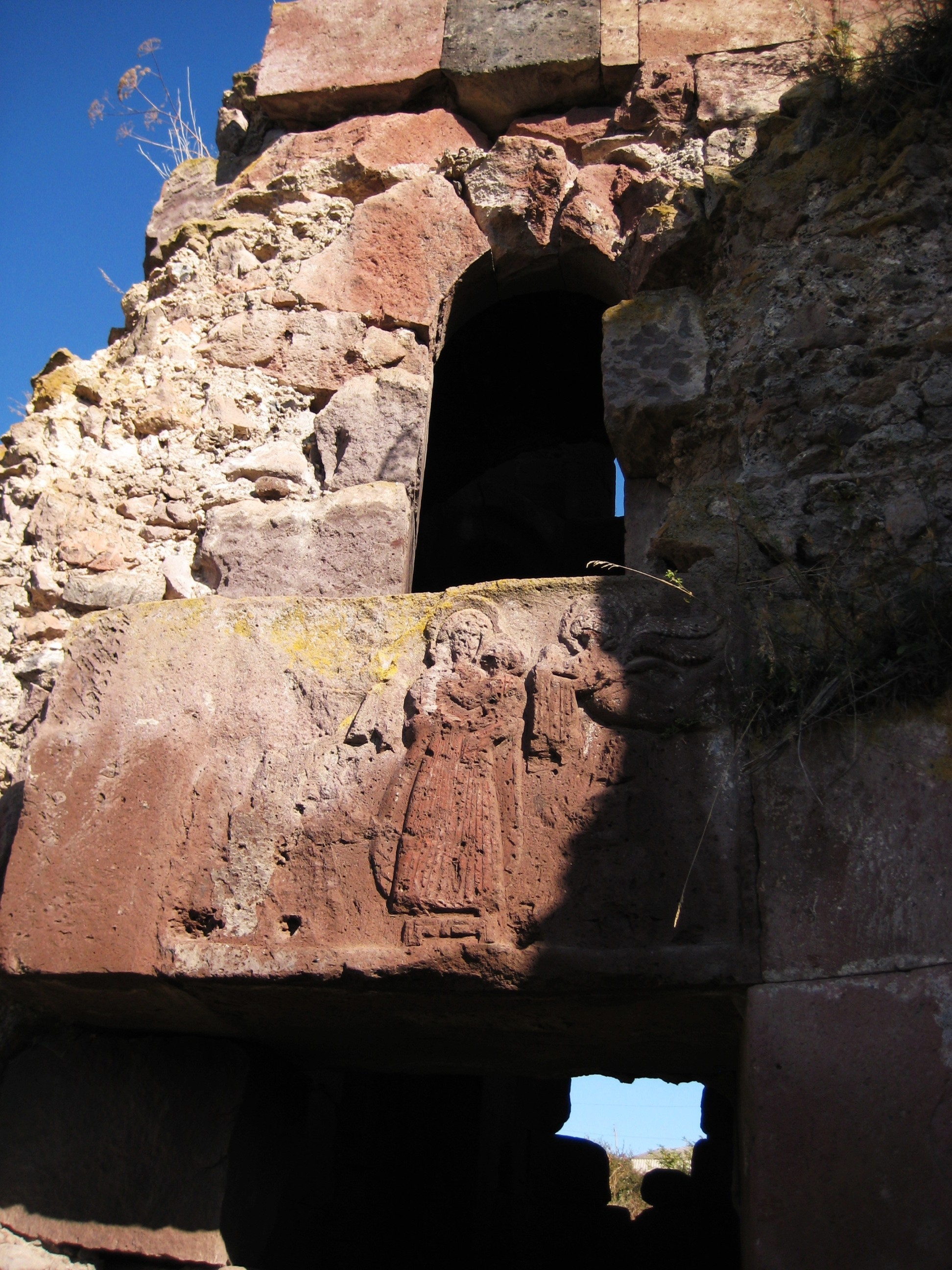
Decorative lintel above the door at the church. The Virgin Mary holds the baby Christ and is flanked by two angels and Maji

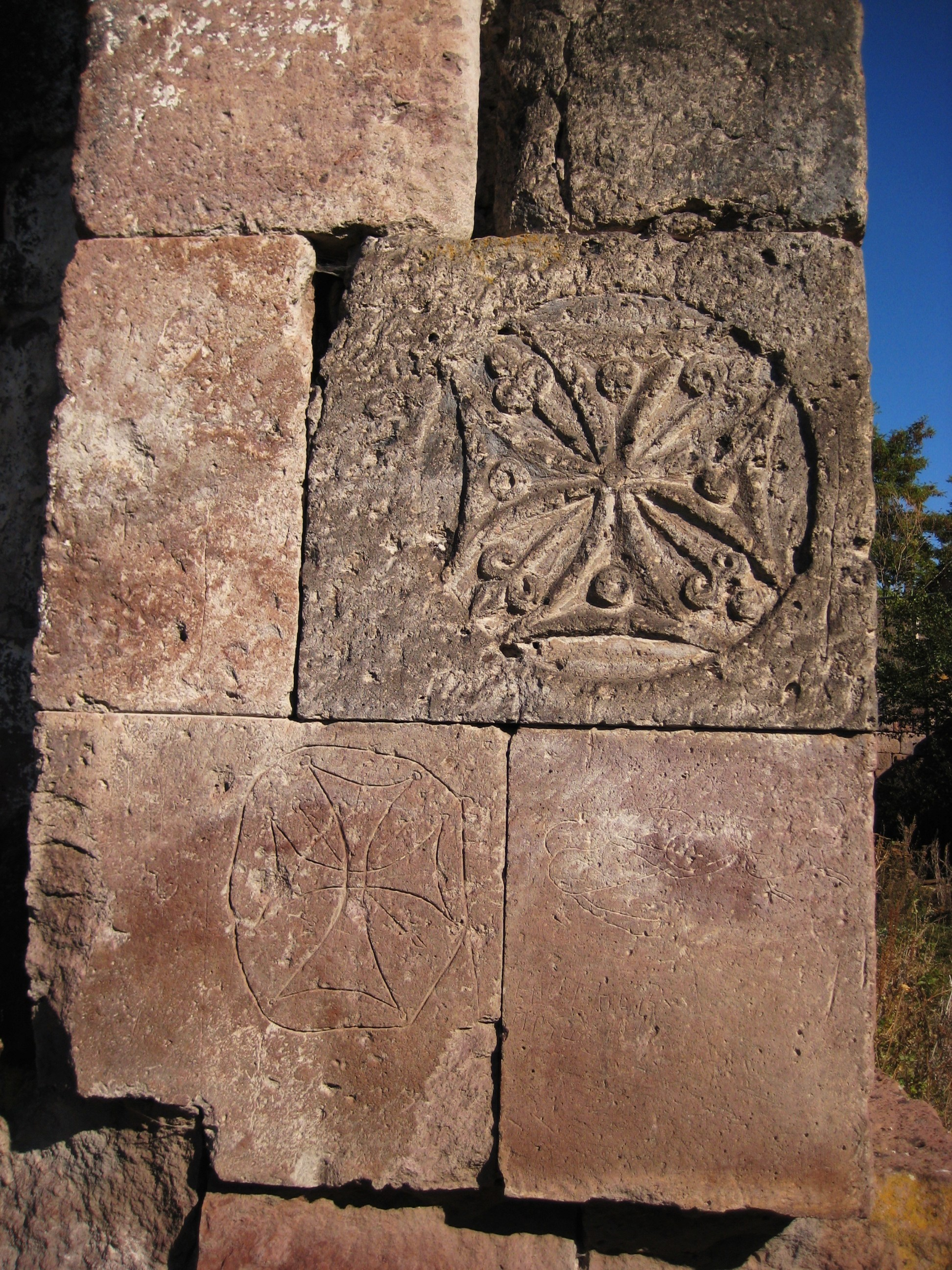
Cross relief upon the front exterior wall

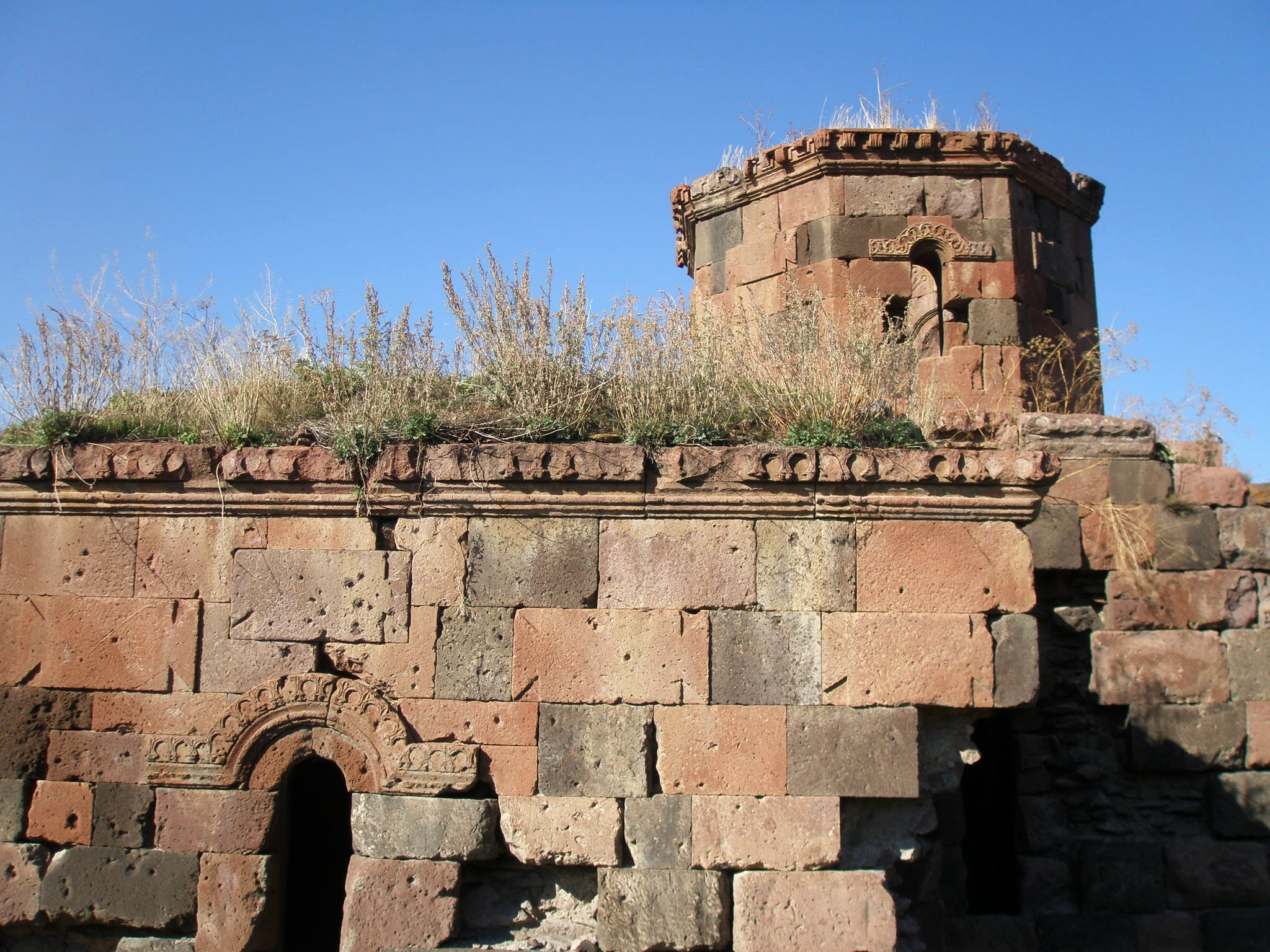
South façade

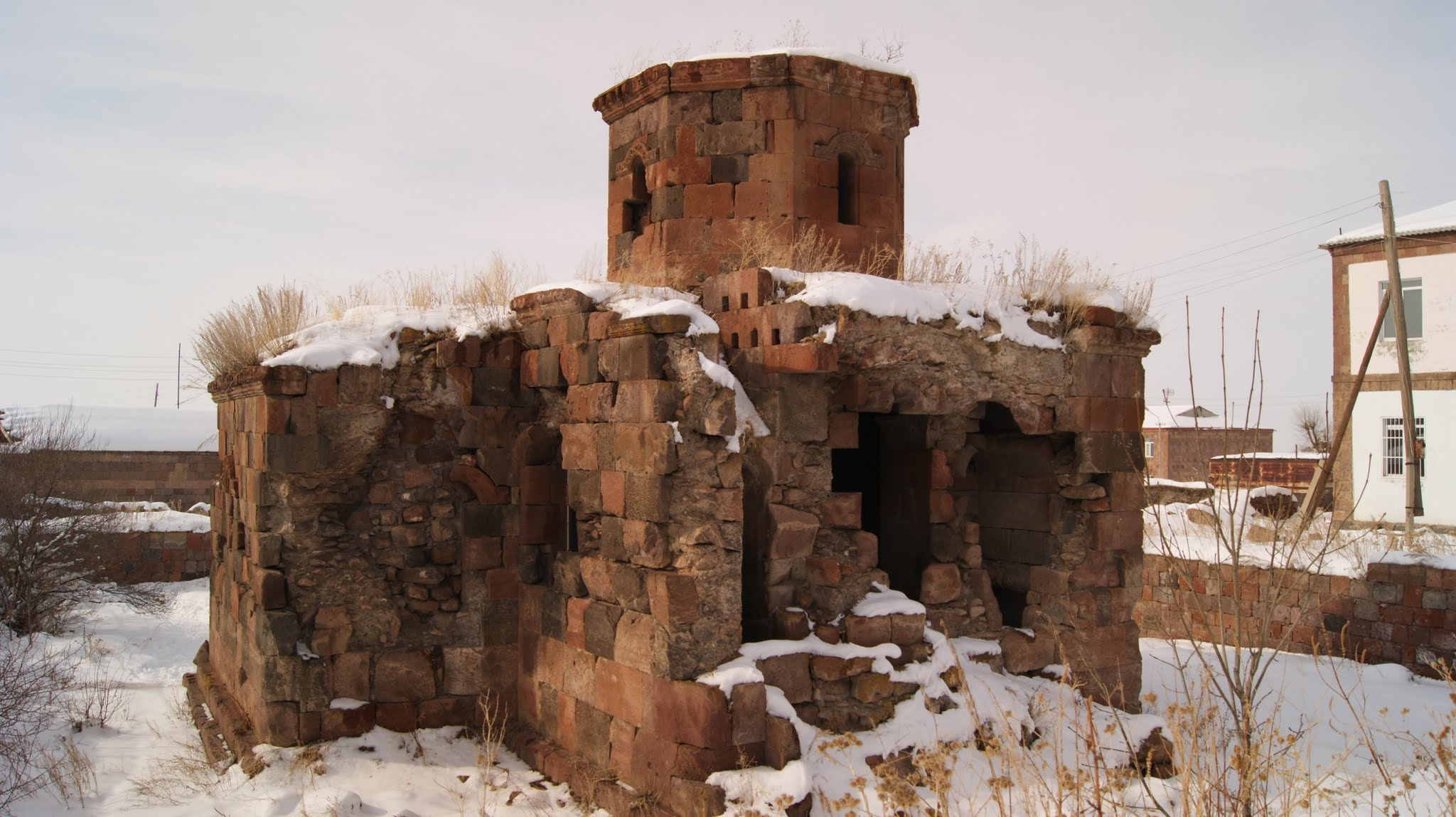
Rear view of the church.
