= Rockwood Asylum =

Coordinates: 44.2159°N 76.5229°W

- Government of Ontario
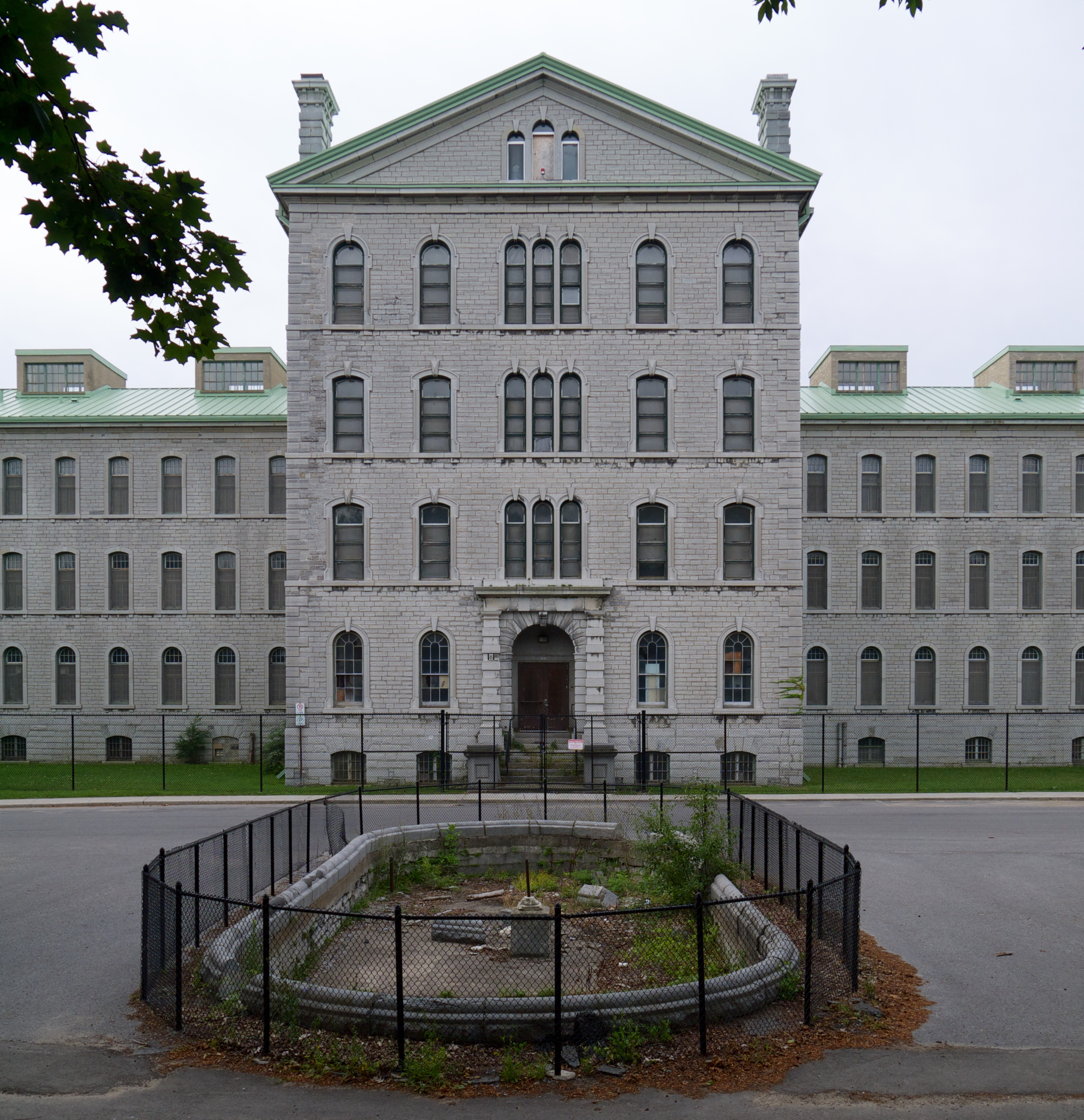
- Entrance to Rockwood Asylum

Geography
- Location: 752 King Street West, Kingston, Ontario, Canada

Organisation
- Type: Specialist

Services
- Beds: 300
- Speciality: Criminally Insane

History
- Construction started: 1859
- Opened: 1862
- Closed: 2000

Rockwood Asylum (also known as Rockwood Lunatic Asylum or Rockwood Asylum for the Criminally Insane) was one of the first criminal asylums in Upper Canada, established in 1859 in Kingston, Ontario. Although methodologies of patient care changed drastically throughout its existence, the facility existed as some form of psychiatric hospital until its closure in 2000. The four-storey building remains vacant on its original property just west of Portsmouth, a few metres inland from the shore of Lake Ontario.

== History ==
The goal of establishing a separate facility in Kingston for the "criminally insane" was founded largely due to issues of overcrowding at local jails and the nearby Kingston Penitentiary. The Provincial Lunatic Asylum established in Toronto and similar institutions in New York persuaded the politicians of Upper Canada to design a facility that incorporated "modern treatment methods" of the time.

The land was rented, and later purchased by the Province of Canada from John Cartwright, whose 40-acre waterfront estate sat just outside the then village of Portsmouth. William Coverdale was selected as the architect of the structure, with much debate over the most optimal layout and progressive hospital design practices of the time. John A. Macdonald—then joint-premier of the Province of Canada—personally inspected the site during construction, weighing in on the ideal size and function of Rockwood Asylum.

== Operation ==
John Palmer Litchfield was the first superintendent of Rockwood, indulging in the practices of bloodletting to "cure" patients. However, Litchfield was later exposed to be an experienced con-man, who had lied about his medical credentials to obtain the position.

Affiliation with Queen's University and the provincial psychiatric system led to much research and debate about the appropriate methods for patient care, which drastically improved under William Metcalf and Charles Kirk Clarke towards the end of the 19th century.

The Cartwright horse stables were used to house female patients until a new wing was added onto the facility in 1868.

The facility had a major shift in 1959, when most patients were transferred to the nearby Ontario Hospital, and Rockwood obtained a new name and purpose: "The Penrose Building", a residence for local citizens with disabilities.

Officially closing in 2000, Coverdale's "Italian-style" stone building remains vacant.
