= Mount Hope United Methodist Church =

Church in Pennsylvania, United States

Coordinates: 39.871089°N 75.440097°W

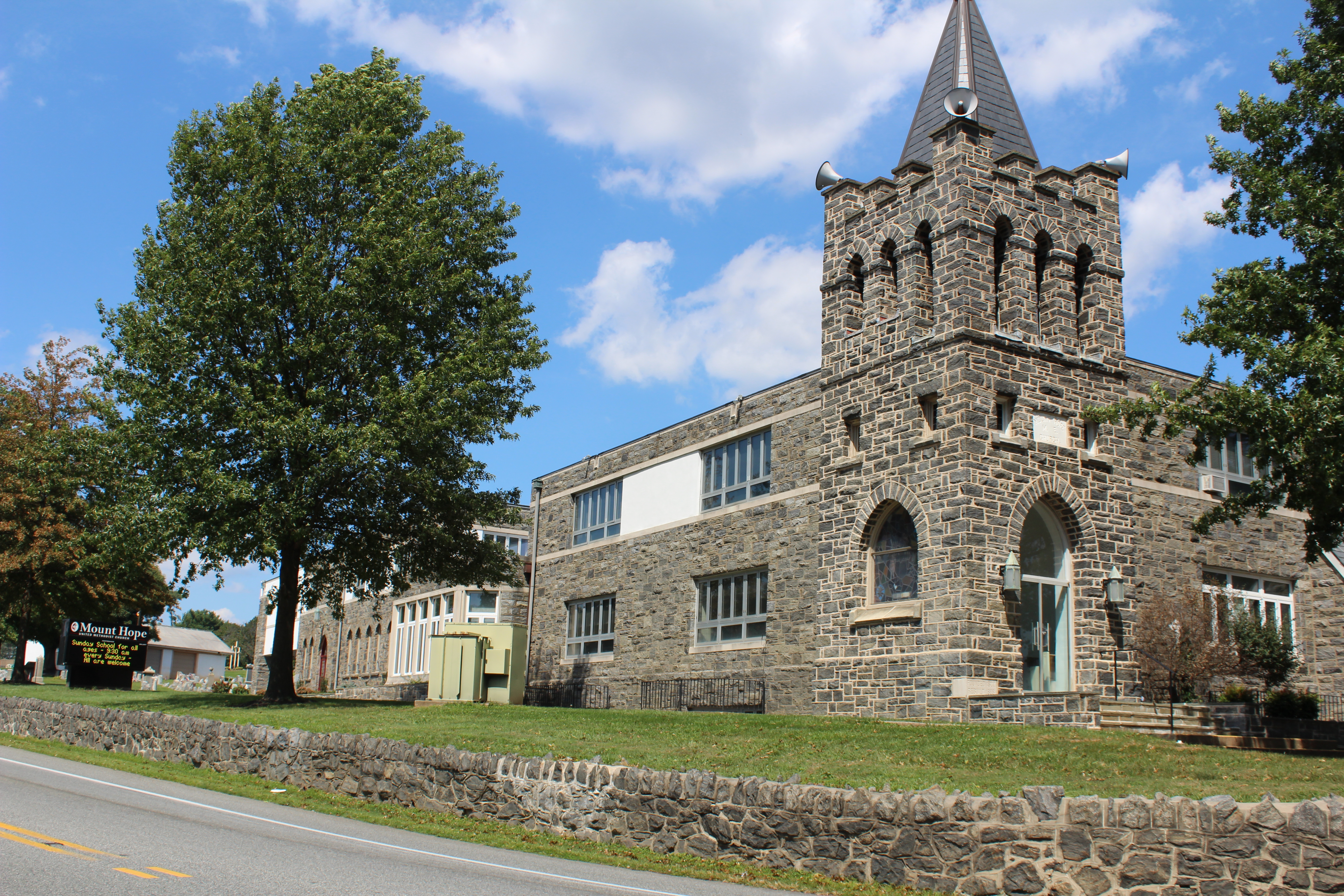
Mount Hope United Methodist Church - September 2017

Mount Hope United Methodist Church is a Methodist church built in 1807 in Aston Township, Delaware County, Pennsylvania, United States. It is located at 4020 Concord Road.

== History ==
The original building was erected in 1807 on land donated by Aaron Mattson, a paper manufacturer in Aston. James Caughey, a Methodist minister and evangelist from England is known to have preached at Mount Hope. A revival led by Caughey in 1832 resulted in an expansion of the congregation at Mount Hope. The congregation outgrew the original structure and in 1838, an addition of 20 ft (6.1 m) was made to the building.

On September 3, 1860, Mount Hope United Methodist Church was incorporated. In 1877, the parsonage was built.

The affiliated Mount Hope Cemetery is run by the Mount Hope Methodist Church Trustees.
