= Portsmouth, Kingston =

Coordinates: 44.2244°N 76.5193°W

Portsmouth Village
- Neighbourhood
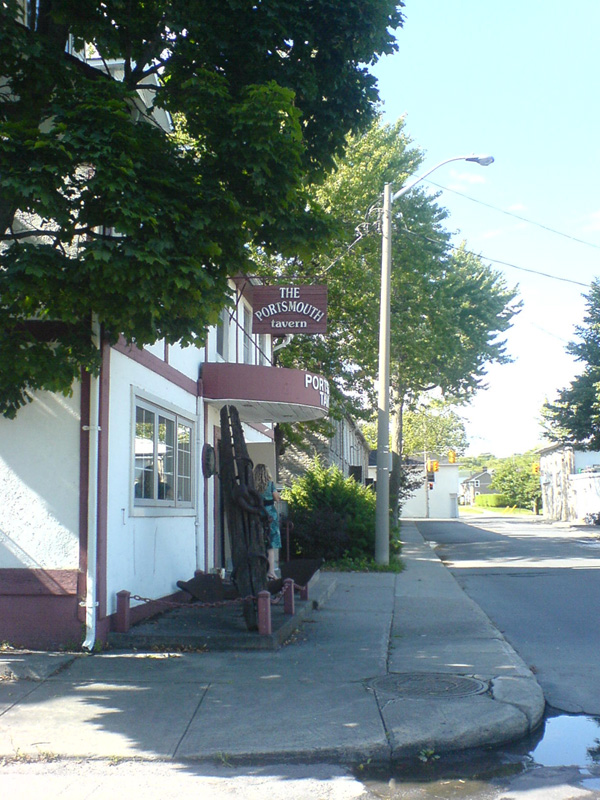
- Portsmouth Tavern on Yonge Street, across from the harbour
- Interactive map of Portsmouth Village
- Country: Canada
- Province: Ontario
- City: Kingston, Ontario

Population
  - Total: 2,740
- Time zone: UTC-5 (Eastern Time Zone)
  - Summer (DST): UTC-4 (Eastern Time Zone)
- Postal code: K7M
- Area code: 613

Portsmouth Village is a formerly incorporated village in Ontario which was annexed to become a neighbourhood of Kingston, Ontario, Canada in 1952.

The village was founded in 1784 by United Empire Loyalists. It began to grow with the establishment of Kingston Penitentiary nearby in 1833 and was formally incorporated in 1858. A town hall was created by William Coverdale in 1865 and is used today by various special interest clubs. The shoreline was soon home to numerous tanneries; breweries, including Molson and Labatt; shipyards; sawmills; and the nearby penitentiary and asylum, Rockwood Asylum (now closed). The penitentiary, Kingston Penitentiary, and asylum are the only establishments from this era that remain today.

Economic opportunities declined at the turn of the 20th century, and the village was annexed by the city of Kingston in 1952. Portsmouth Village is home to Portsmouth Olympic Harbour, which held the yachting and boating events of the 1976 Summer Olympics in Montreal.

Today the area retains its historic village feel while being a part of the city of Kingston.

The district is bounded by Johnson Street to the north, Portsmouth Avenue to the west, Lake Ontario to the south, and Sir John A. Macdonald Boulevard to the east. Numerous amenities are available including a school, arena, and several historic churches and parks. There are also numerous local businesses along King Street West. The north-eastern portion of Portsmouth is home to the West Campus of Queen's University as well as Richardson Memorial Stadium, home of the Queen's Golden Gaels.

Portsmouth is 3.5 kilometres (2.2 mi) west of Kingston City Hall. St. Lawrence College and Lake Ontario Park lie on the western boundary of the village at Portsmouth Avenue, along with Cataraqui Golf and Country Club, which operates a nationally renowned golf course and a curling club.

== Notable attractions ==
- Portsmouth Olympic Harbour
- Correctional Service of Canada Museum
- Richardson Memorial Stadium
- Queen's University West Campus

=== Image gallery ===
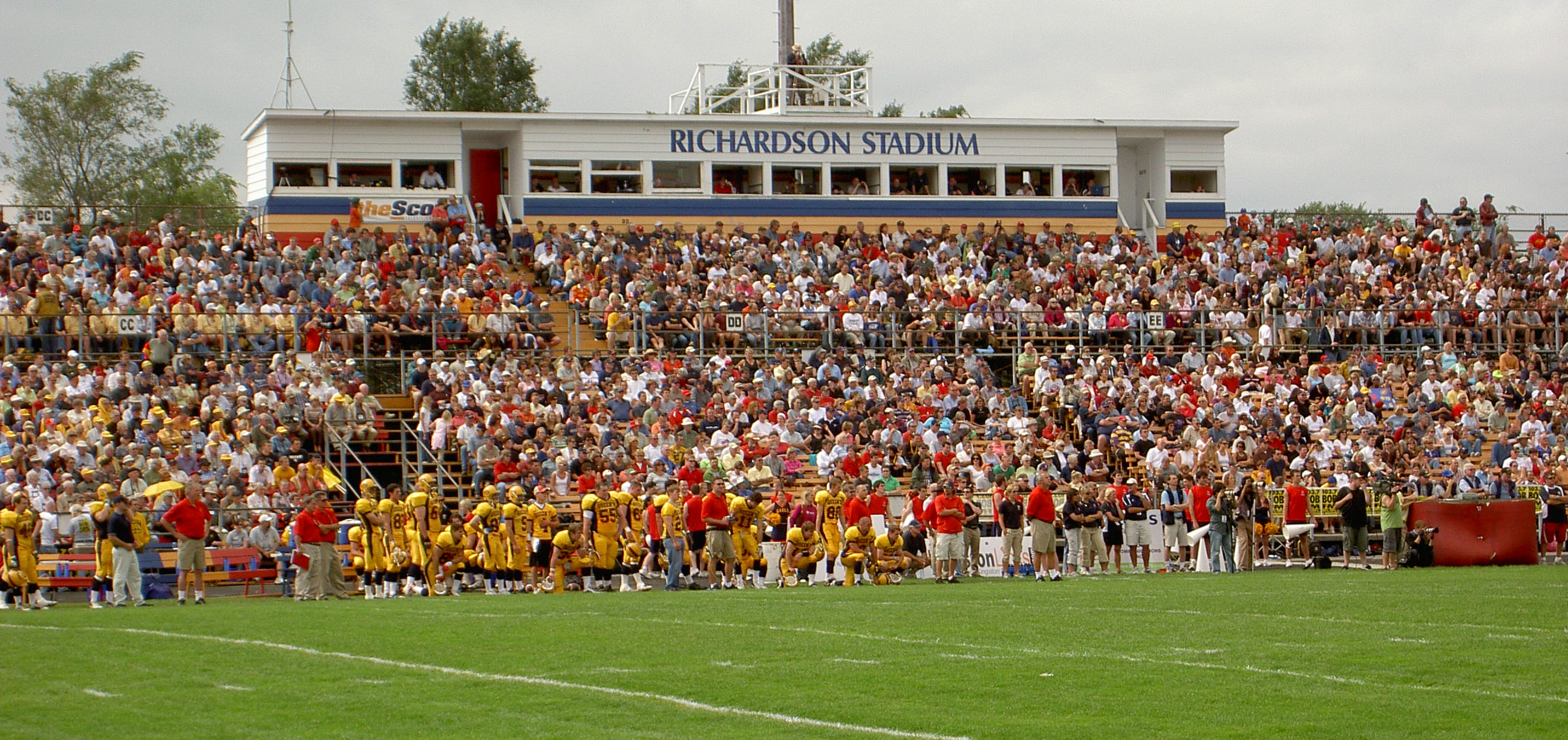
Richardson Memorial Stadium

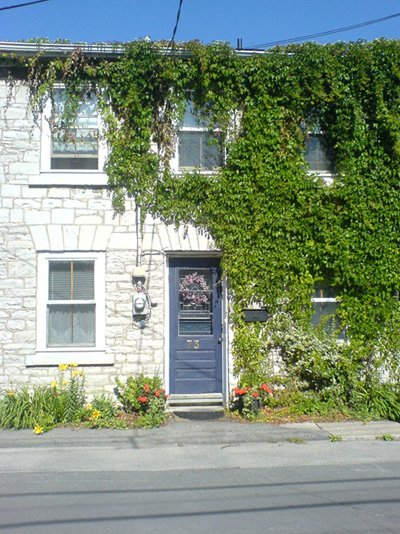
Home in Portsmouth Village
