= El Koubba Mosque =

Mosque in Tunis, Tunisia

- جامع القبة
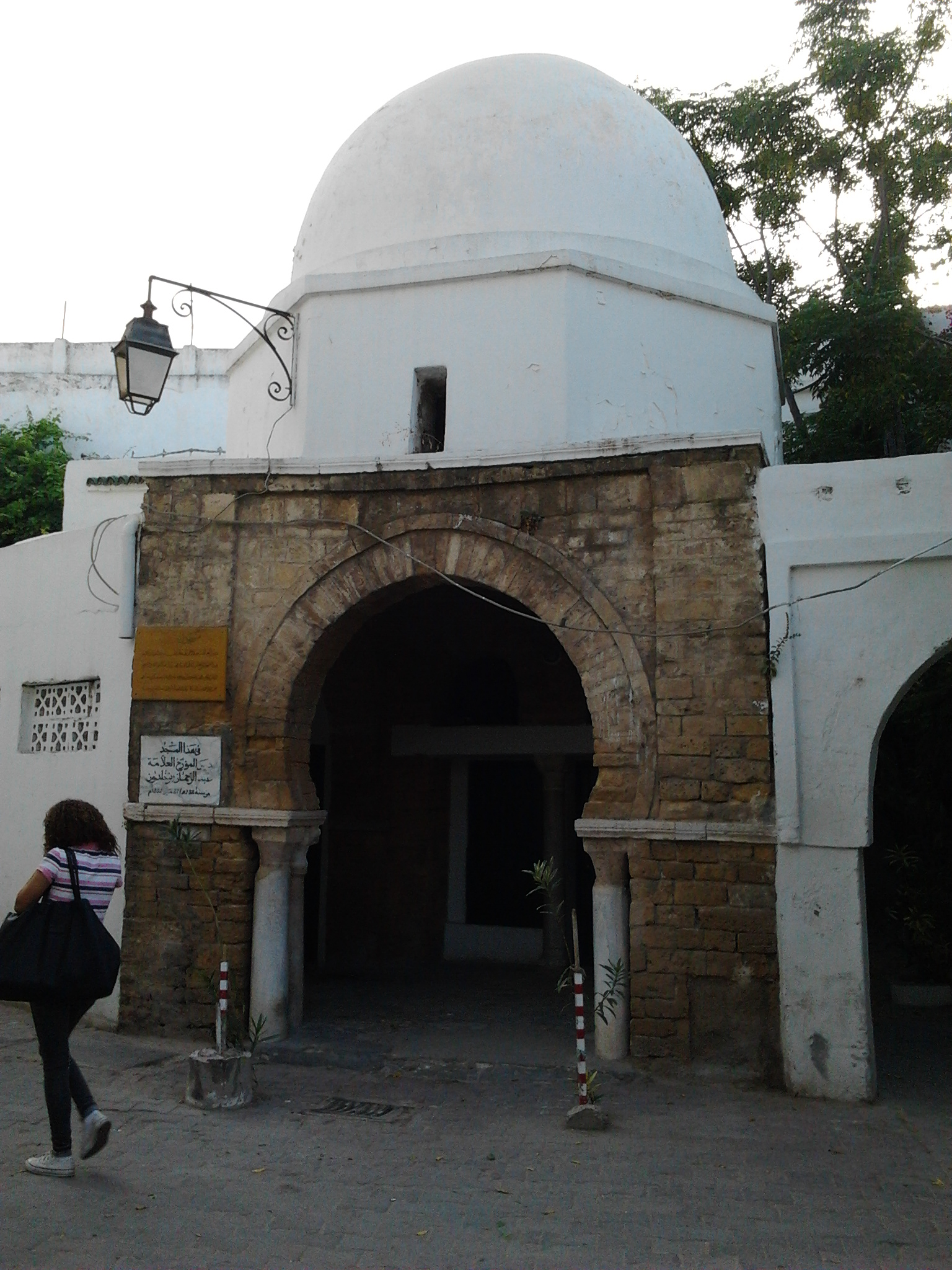

Religion
- Affiliation: Islam
- Branch/tradition: Sunni

Location
- Location: Tunis, Tunisia
- Interactive map of El Koubba Mosque

Architecture
- Type: mosque
- Established: 11th century

El Koubba Mosque or Mosque of the Dome (Arabic: جامع القبة) is a small mosque built in the 11th century in the medina of Tunis. It is located at 41 Tourbet El Bey Street.

== History ==
According to the panel at the entrance of the mosque, it was built in the 11th century. It is known as the place where the historiographer and historian Ibn Khaldun did his studies and researches.

== Description ==
The entrance of the mosque is topped by a hemispheric dome with a clerestory that was built on top of a hexagonal tholobate.

The prayer room was probably constructed after the entrance. It has three naves and two bays divided by two columns with Corinthian capitals.

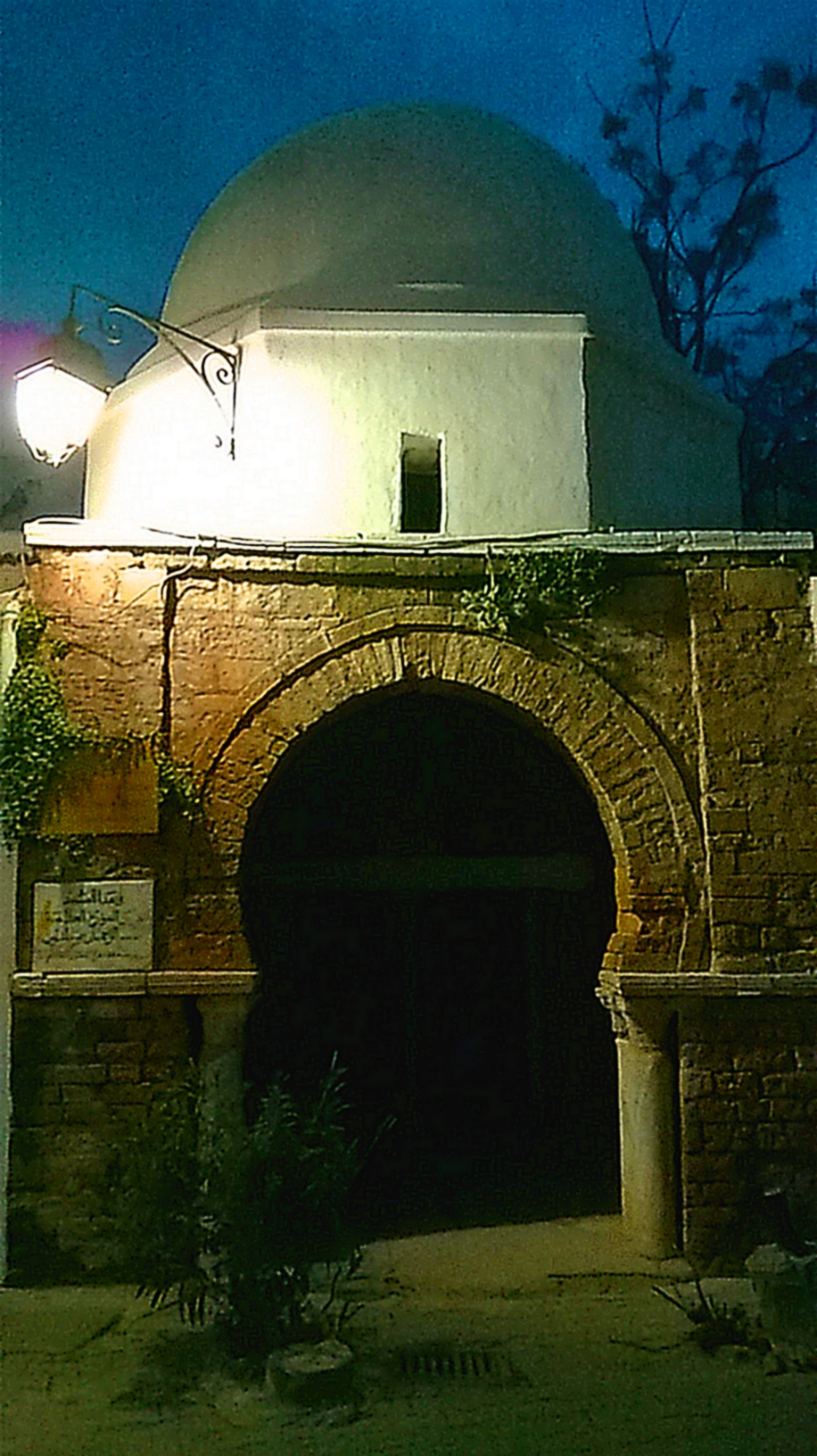
The mosque by night

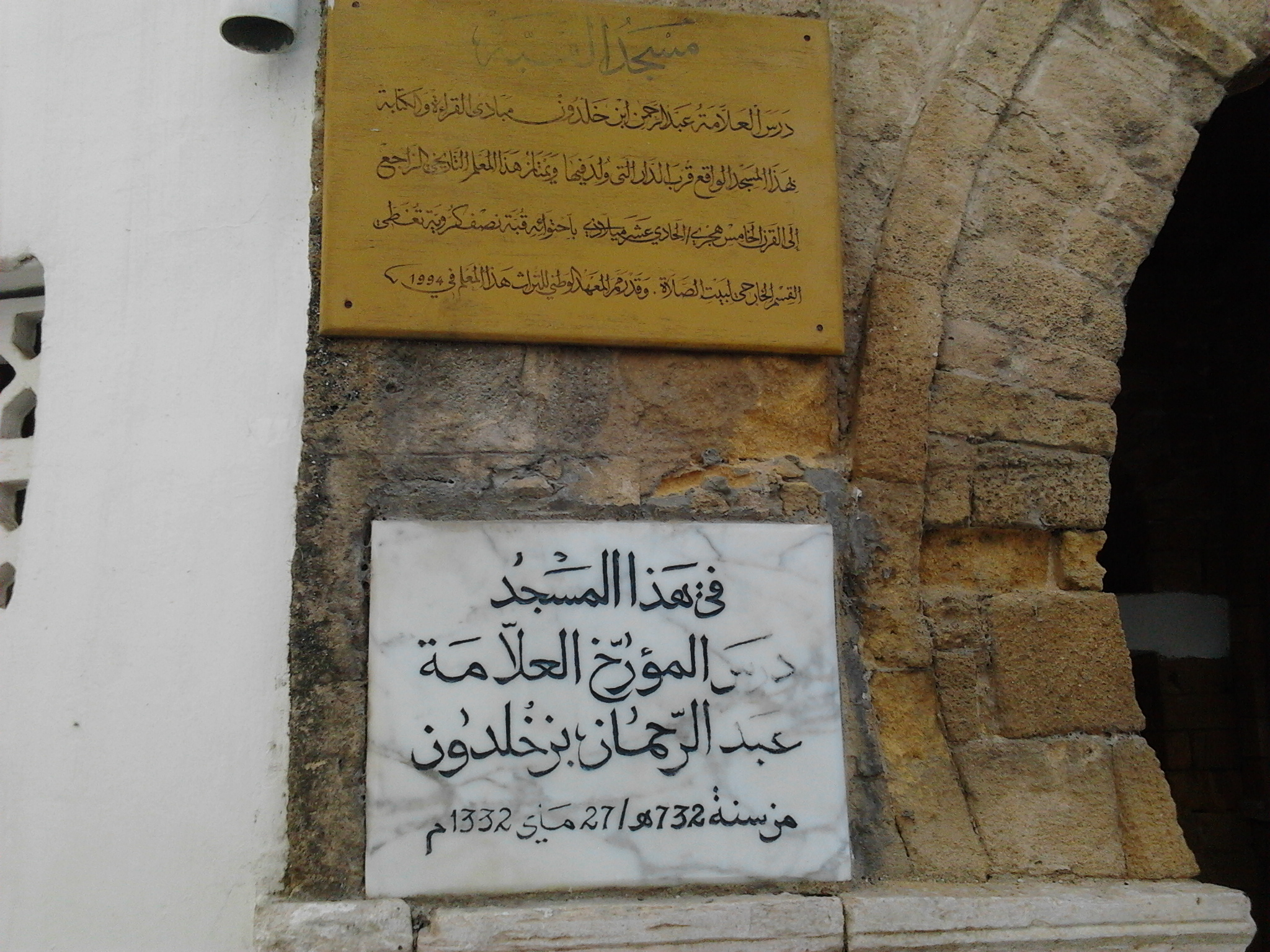
Commemorative plaque at the entrance of the mosque
