= Sydenham Street United Church =

Church in Kingston, Ontario, Canada

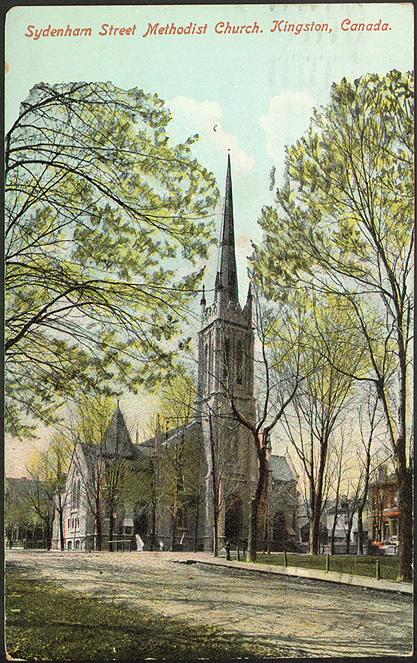
- 1910 Postcard of the church

Religion
- Affiliation: United Church of Canada
- Province: Ontario
- Year consecrated: 1852

Location
- Location: 82 Sydenham Street; Kingston, Ontario; K7L 3H4
- Municipality: Kingston
- State: Canada
- Interactive map of Sydenham Street United Church
- Coordinates: 44.229872°N 76.488408°W

Website
- sydenhamstreet.ca/ssuc1/

Sydenham Street United Church, formerly Sydenham Street Methodist Church, is a church in Kingston, Ontario, Canada that dates to 1852. It was originally a Methodist church, but since 1925 has belonged to the United Church of Canada.

== Origins ==
The church has its origins in the New Methodist Chapel, a small frame building built in 1811 in the village of Kingston at the corner of Wellington and Johnson streets. Another small frame chapel was built in 1816–17 by British Wesleyans on the southeast corner of Bay and Bagot streets, and was enlarged in 1835. The two congregations combined when the various branches of Methodism were unified. The Rev. Egerton Ryerson (1803–1882) was their resident minister at the time of Lord Sydenham’s death.

== Construction ==
John Counter (1799–1862), a prominent Kingston businessman and first mayor of the city of Kingston, was a strong supporter of the Wesleyan Methodists. He donated the property for the Sydenham Street Church. The land had formerly been used as the circus grounds. The building was designed by the architect William Coverdale. John Counter laid the cornerstone on 17 April 1851. The Reverend Samuel Dwight Rice was transferred from Mount Elgin to Kingston, and helped manage the construction project. Counter served on the church's management committee.

The 1852 church was a stone building 60 by 90 feet (18 by 27 m), with a seating capacity of between 1,000 and 1,200. The cost was about CAN$28,000. Improvements were made later costing CAN$6,000, and the church was reopened on 14 July 1878. Further improvements were made in 1887, when Power and Son of Kingston were responsible for widening the church. The stone building is "plain Gothic" in style. It has tall and narrow windows decorated with tracery. Pairs of lancet openings fill the belfry stage of the tower. The tower has many pinnacles, which used to end in leafy finials, since lost. They punctuate the intricate battlements that surround the narrow spire.

== Methodist church ==
Soon after the church opened the Methodist evangelist James Caughey spent four months in Kingston. Hundreds of people came to hear him speak at the Sydenham Street Methodist Church, and it is said that he was directly responsible for almost four hundred conversions or experiences of sanctification. He preached his last sermon at the church on 13 March 1853. In 1860 the Methodists held their conference in Kingston at the church. The doctor, educator, and civil servant Michael Lavell (1825–1901) was a member of the congregation. Samuel Dwight Chown (1853–1933), later head of the Methodist Church when the United Church was formed, was converted at the Sydenham Street Church in 1868 soon after his father had died. Chown was converted at revival services held in the church, a normal feature of Methodism at the time.

The Methodists held their General Conference of 1882 at the church. In 1889 the evangelists Hugh Crossley and John Hunter launched their campaign from the church, the first of a series of meetings where they asked their audience to repent of their sins, convert, and live a life pleasing to God, avoiding secular entertainments such as the theater. The Kingston Daily British Whig reported the "quite a number found their way to the altar" at this first meeting. Crossley and Hunter were celebrities, and consciously exploited this to raise excitement in the hope of making conversions. A report of their final service at the Sydenham Street Methodist Church in 1889 said the galleries were filled by women five minutes after the doors were opened. "Then the dear ladies banked themselves against the door, waiting so patiently for the time when they could crowd on the main floor. It was the final night! Theatre goers know what that means." The resident minister at this time was Carson, who was given a salary of CAN$2,000 per year, and a house provided by the church.

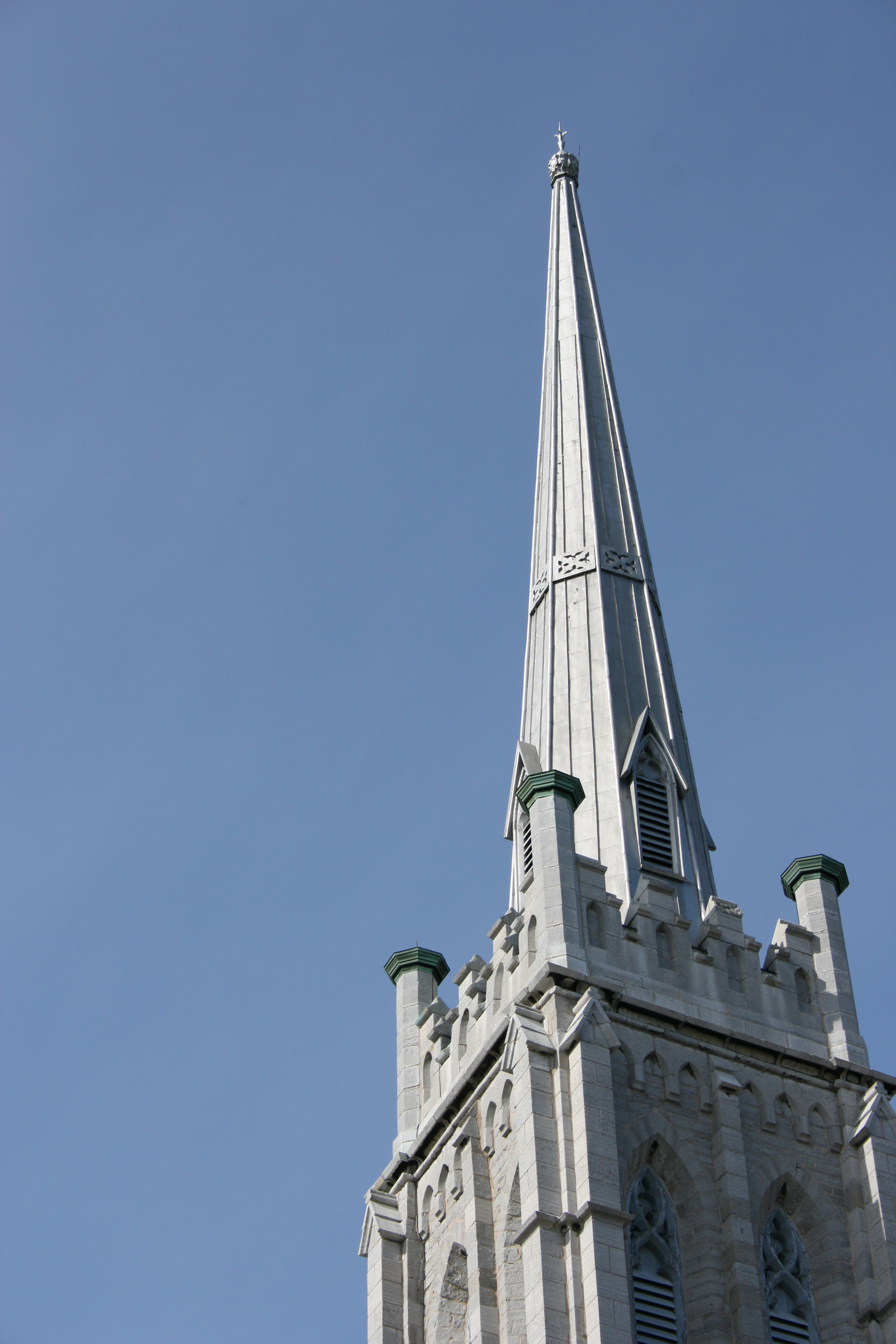
Spire of the church in 2009

On 25 September 1892 Garrett's Harvest Cantata (1889) was performed for the first time in Canada at the church. In 1897 the American evangelist Dwight L. Moody, with his musical assistant J.H. Burke, came to Kingston and held two days of meetings at the Sydenham Street Methodist Church and Kingston Penitentiary. His evangelism was received enthusiastically by Kingston workers, 1,000 of whom were unable to gain access. During the Second Boer War (1899–1902) Canada sent troops to support the British in South Africa. In January 1900 a special service was held in the Sydenham Street Methodist Church with C Battery of the second contingent in attendance. The Christian Guardian reported the service and commented,

We should pray that our national character may form, in these trying times, like Peter's character – rock-like firmness and fidelity toward God, right and truth. It is said that the eve of battle always found Nelson upon his knees commending his cause, his country and his crew to God. These times should find all Britain's sons and daughters much in prayer. Our generals, our soldiers, and our citizens should be united in this solemn, holy exercise that we may be God-guided, God-girded, and God-guarded."

== United Church ==
The Reverend R.H. Bell was pastor in 1925, when he accepted an invitation to the pastorate of Young Methodist Church, Winnipeg, in June. That year the Methodists joined the Congregationalists and most of the Presbyterians to form the United Church of Canada. The church took its present name of Sydenham Street United Church. When Queen Elizabeth II visited Canada in 1959 she attended a service at the church on 28 June 1959.

By the 1960s 400–600 people attended two services each week. In 1996, there were about 200 attendees at one service on Sunday mornings. In the late 1990s the congregation decided to become an "affirming congregation", one in which people of all sexual orientations and gender identities were welcome.

The church building, now known as The Spire, is used for a wide variety of community functions. It has been the home of the Cantabile Choirs of Kingston for twenty years. It is also used by the Kingston Choral Society, and houses the offices of Autism Ontario, Our Livable Solutions, Kuluta Buddhist Centre, and Moira's Piano Studio. Approximately 1,000 people use the building each week . The church has been used for concerts by many artists, including Henry Rollins, Richie Havens, Joel Plaskett, Ron Sexsmith, Arlo Guthrie, Angela Hewitt, Dan Mangan, Bruce Cockburn, Measha Brueggergosman, Liona Boyd, Matt Good, The Good Lovelies, Glass Tiger, Kathleen Edwards and Fred Penner. As well as the main hall, which has a stage on which performances may be given, there is a lecture hall, a board room and other rooms that can be used for meetings or conferences by groups.

== Sources ==
- Airhart, Phyllis D. (1992-02-26). Serving the Present Age: Revivalism, Progressivism, and the Methodist Tradition in Canada. McGill-Queen's Press - MQUP. ISBN 978-0-7735-6319-3.
- Angus, Margaret S. (1976). "COUNTER, JOHN". Dictionary of Canadian Biography. Vol. 9. University of Toronto/Université Laval.
- Bousfield, Arthur; Toffoli, Garry (2002-09-01). Fifty Years the Queen: A Tribute to Elizabeth II on Her Golden Jubilee. Dundurn. ISBN 978-1-55488-163-5.
- Carroll, John (1877). Case and His cotemporaries: Or, The Canadian Itinerant's Memorial: Constituting a Biographical History of Methodism in Canada, from Its Introduction Into the Province, Till the Death of the Rev. Wm. Case in 1855. S. Rose.
- Cornish, George Henry (1881). Cyclopædia of Methodism in Canada: Containing Historical, Educational and Statistical Information, Dating from the Beginning of the Work in the Several Provinces of the Dominion of Canada ... Methodist Book and Publishing House.
- Crouse, Eric R. (2005-09-23). Revival in the City: The Impact of American Evangelists in Canada, 1884-1914. McGill-Queen's Press - MQUP. ISBN 978-0-7735-7290-4.
- Fryer, Mary Beacock; Lamb, John William; Turner, Larry (1997). The meaning of the stones: the life and times of Wall Street United Church, Brockville, Ontario. The Church. ISBN 978-0-9682301-0-7.
- Heath, Gordon L. (2009-03-01). War with a Silver Lining: Canadian Protestant Churches and the South African War, 1899-1902. McGill-Queen's Press - MQUP. ISBN 978-0-7735-3480-3.
- James, William Closson (2011-09-20). God's Plenty: Religious Diversity in Kingston. McGill-Queen's Press - MQUP. ISBN 978-0-7735-3889-4.
- Kee, Kevin (2006-06-26). Revivalists: Marketing the Gospel in English Canada, 1884-1957. MQUP. ISBN 978-0-7735-7817-3.
- Machar, Agens Maule (1908). The Story of Old Kingston. Toronto: The Mussen Book Co.
- McKendry, Jennifer (1995). With our past before us: nineteenth-century architecture in the Kingston area. University of Toronto Press. ISBN 978-0-8020-7474-4.
- "Old Stones Building New Communities". Sydenham Street United Church.
- Oliver, Peter (1994). "LAVELL, MICHAEL". Dictionary of Canadian Biography. Vol. 13. University of Toronto/Université Laval.
- OGSKBr (2010). "Places of Worship Project for Frontenac County".
- Rawlyk, George A. (1993-01-01). Wrapped Up in God: A Study of Several Canadian Revivals and Revivalists. McGill-Queen's Press - MQUP. ISBN 978-0-7735-1131-6.
- "Rev. Samuel Dwight Rice, D.D.". The Methodist Review. Phillips & Hunt. November 1886.
- Rose, George Maclean (1888). A Cyclopaedia of Canadian Biography: Being Chiefly Men of the Time. A Collection of Persons Distinguished in Professional and Political Life; Leaders in the Commerce and Industry of Canada, and Successful Pioneers. Rose Publishing Company.
- Sanderson, Joseph Edward (1910). The First Century of Methodism in Canada: 1775-1839. W. Briggs.
- Shepherd, Paul (2012-06-10). "United we .. keep uniting" (PDF). Iondale Heights United Church, Scarborough.
- Simpson, Matthew (1883). Cyclopaedia of Methodism: Embracing Sketches of Its Rise, Progress, and Present Condition, with Biographical Notices and Numerous Illustrations. L.H. Everts.
- Temperley, Nicholas; Banfield, Stephen (2010). Music and the Wesleys. University of Illinois Press. ISBN 978-0-252-07767-8.
- University of Toronto Monthly. 1925.
