= Providence Care =

Geography
- Location: Kingston, Ontario, Canada
- Coordinates: 44°14′07″N 076°29′10″W

Organization
- Care system: Public Medicare (OHIP)
- Type: Chronic care
- Affiliated university: Queen's University

Services
- Emergency department: No
- Beds: 243+198+144=585

History
- Founded: 1861

Links
- Website: http://www.providencecare.ca
- Lists: Hospitals in Canada

Providence Care is a teaching hospital affiliated with Queen's University located in Kingston, Ontario that was built in 1861. Providence Care is a not-for-profit organization governed by a volunteer Board of Directors and sponsored by the Catholic Health Corporation of Ontario. The Worship Centre overlooks Lake Ontario and was designed with input from faith leaders from the Kingston, Ontario community. Providence Care has 585 patient beds. Providence Care is a partner within Kingston's University hospitals in the Southeast LHIN, delivering health care, conducting research and training health care professionals.

== History ==
Providence Care was founded on December 13, 1861 by the Sisters of Providence of St. Vincent de Paul to meet the physical, emotional, social and spiritual needs of its patients with respect, dignity and compassion.

The centre has three sites. The budget and range of programs and services are a result of government-directed OHIP hospital restructuring that consolidated rehabilitation programs, specialized mental health services, and forensics at the Providence Care Corporation.

== Sites ==
=== Providence Manor ===
Providence Manor is a 243-bed long-term care home, located in downtown Kingston. It is where, in 1861, the Sisters of Providence of St. Vincent de Paul first began their mission. Providence Manor has a secure Alzheimer unit with two beds for short stays. The Hildegarde Centre and Adult Day Away program provide a variety of recreational, physical, social and spiritual activities in a structured setting, offering respite to clients and their caregivers during times of need.

=== Mental health services ===
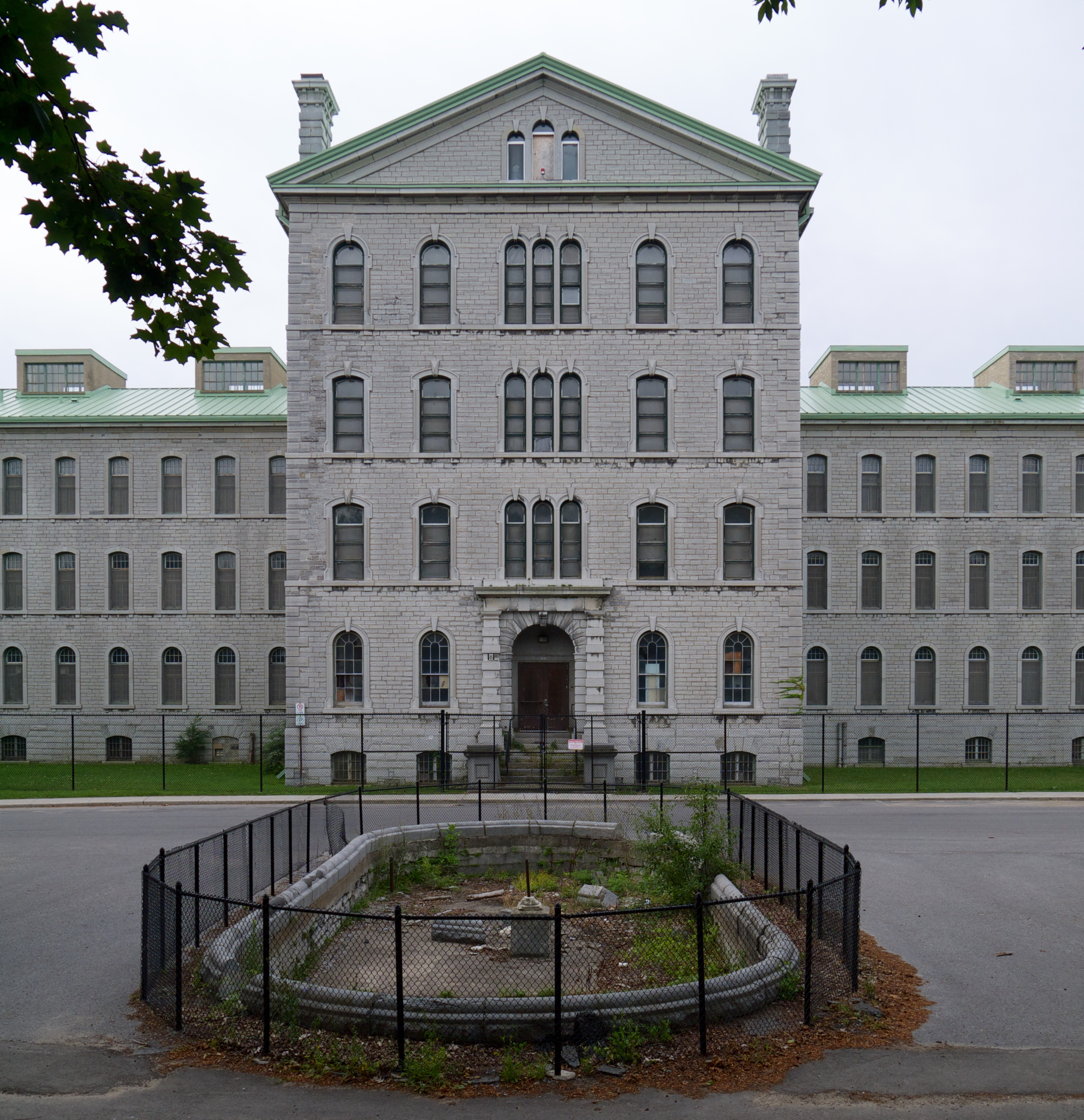
Rockwood Asylum building constructed in the 1860s

Providence Care's Mental Health Services site is a 198-bed facility that provides specialized services to adults in southeastern Ontario with all forms of serious mental illness. Providence Care Mental Health Services is a teaching hospital, providing treatment through three clinical program areas: Adult Treatment and Rehabilitation, Geriatric Psychiatry and Forensic Psychiatry. Mental health services in Kingston began in 1862 with the construction of Rockwood Asylum for the Insane. This large, four-storey limestone building was constructed using convict labour from the nearby Kingston Penitentiary. The structure still stands today, although it is no longer open to the public.

In 1877, the facility was transferred to the provincial government and remained in operation until 1975. In 1957, a new hospital, Westwood, was built on the same grounds as what was then known as the Ontario Hospital Kingston. In the late 1960s, the institution was renamed Kingston Psychiatric Hospital. It continued to operate under that name until the Ontario government transferred its management to Providence Care.

=== St. Mary's of the Lake Hospital ===
St. Mary's of the Lake Hospital provides non-acute chronic health care for people living in southeastern Ontario. Established in 1946, it is a teaching hospital specializing in rehabilitation, specialized geriatric services, complex continuing care and palliative care. St. Mary's of the Lake hospital has 144 beds: 72 complex continuing care, 6 palliative care, 46 rehabilitation, 16 geriatric medicine, and 4 respite care beds.

=== Providence Care Hospital ===
Providence Care Hospital is a 270-bed facility built on the same property as the former Mental Health Services building, designed by Parkin Architects Limited in joint venture with Adamson Associates. In 2024, a new centre for research using psychedelic drugs was opened.

== See also ==
- Kingston General Hospital
- Hotel Dieu Hospital
