= Pemzashen =

Pemzashen Պեմզաշեն
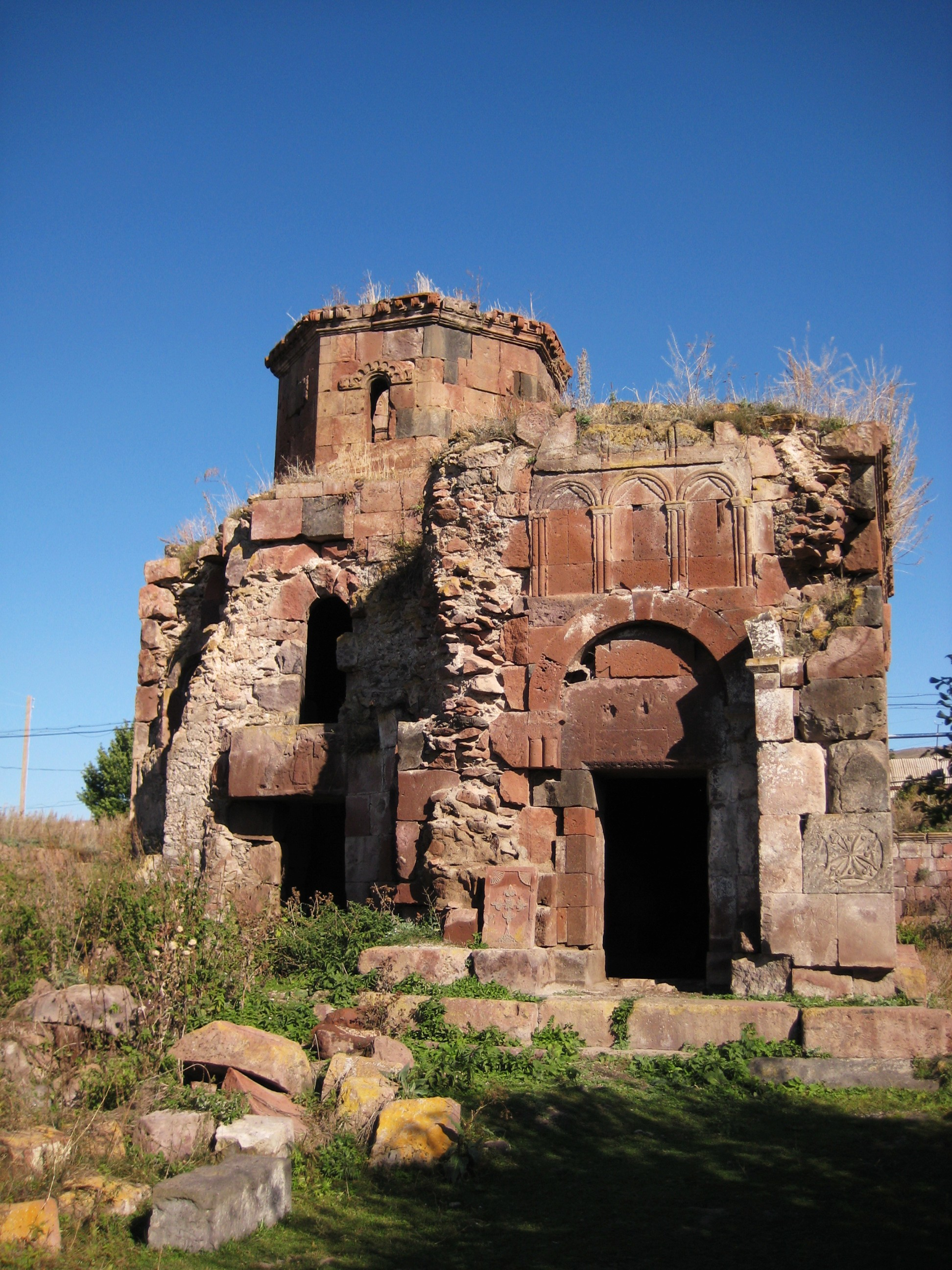
- Pemzashen Church, 7th century

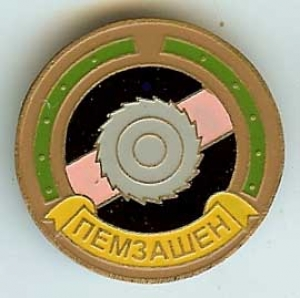
- Coat of arms

- Location within Armenia Location within Shirak
- Coordinates: 40°35′36″N 43°56′24″E
- Country: Armenia
- Province: Shirak
- Municipality: Artik

Government
  - Mayor: Ananik Voskanyan

Population (2011)
  - Total: 3,244

Pemzashen (Armenian: Պեմզաշեն) is a village in the Artik Municipality of the Shirak Province of Armenia. During the Soviet era a sewing factory, construction materials plant, and a parts factory to supply hydro-electric stations were based out of Pemzashen. After the collapse of the USSR, most of the village's residents have found themselves out of work and many of the men have moved to Russia to find jobs. In the past 15 years, over 300 families have moved away from the village. There is also the problem of a lack of irrigation water for crops or household gardens, and the land around the village is not flat or fertile (due to no irrigation). Plans are currently underway to put in an irrigation system.

In the middle of village is a 7th-century church adjacent to the foundations of a 5th-century basilica. Just west of the village off of the main road leading from Pemzashen to Artik is Arakelots Vank of the 11th century. Along the road south to Lernakert, is also Makaravank built in the 10th to 13th centuries, with the church of Surb Sion of 1001. In the gorge below is a small church built on earlier foundations constructed in the 18th century with a hermit's cell cut into the cliff face behind.

== Demographics ==
Historical population
Year	Pop.	±% p.a.
1831	191	—
1897	1,496	+3.17%
1926	1,331	−0.40%
1939	1,757	+2.16%
1959	3,599	+3.65%
1989	3,384	−0.21%
2001	2,862	−1.39%
2011	3,244	+1.26%

== Gallery ==
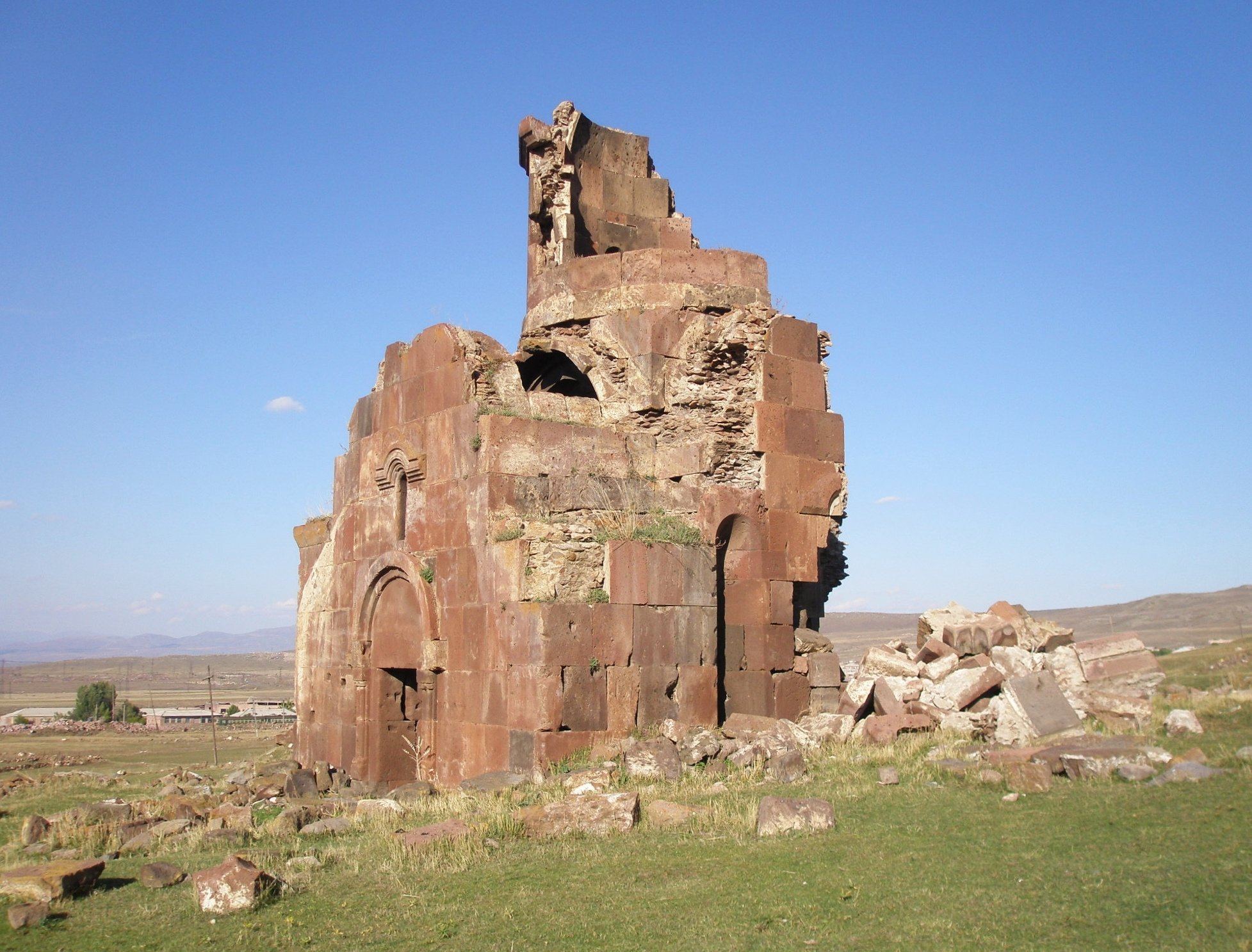
Arakelots Vank northwest corner, 11th century

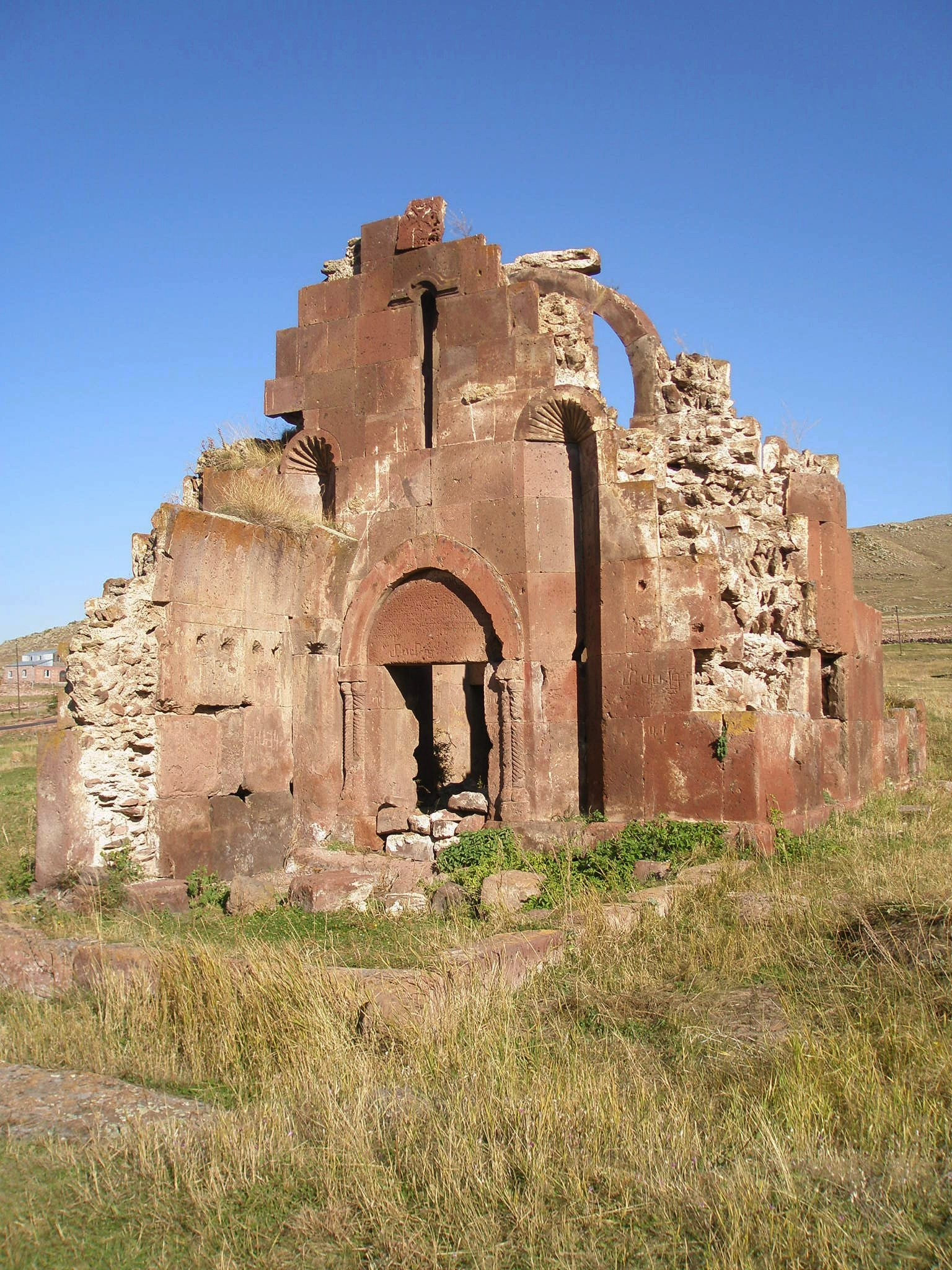
Makaravank Church, 10th-13th century

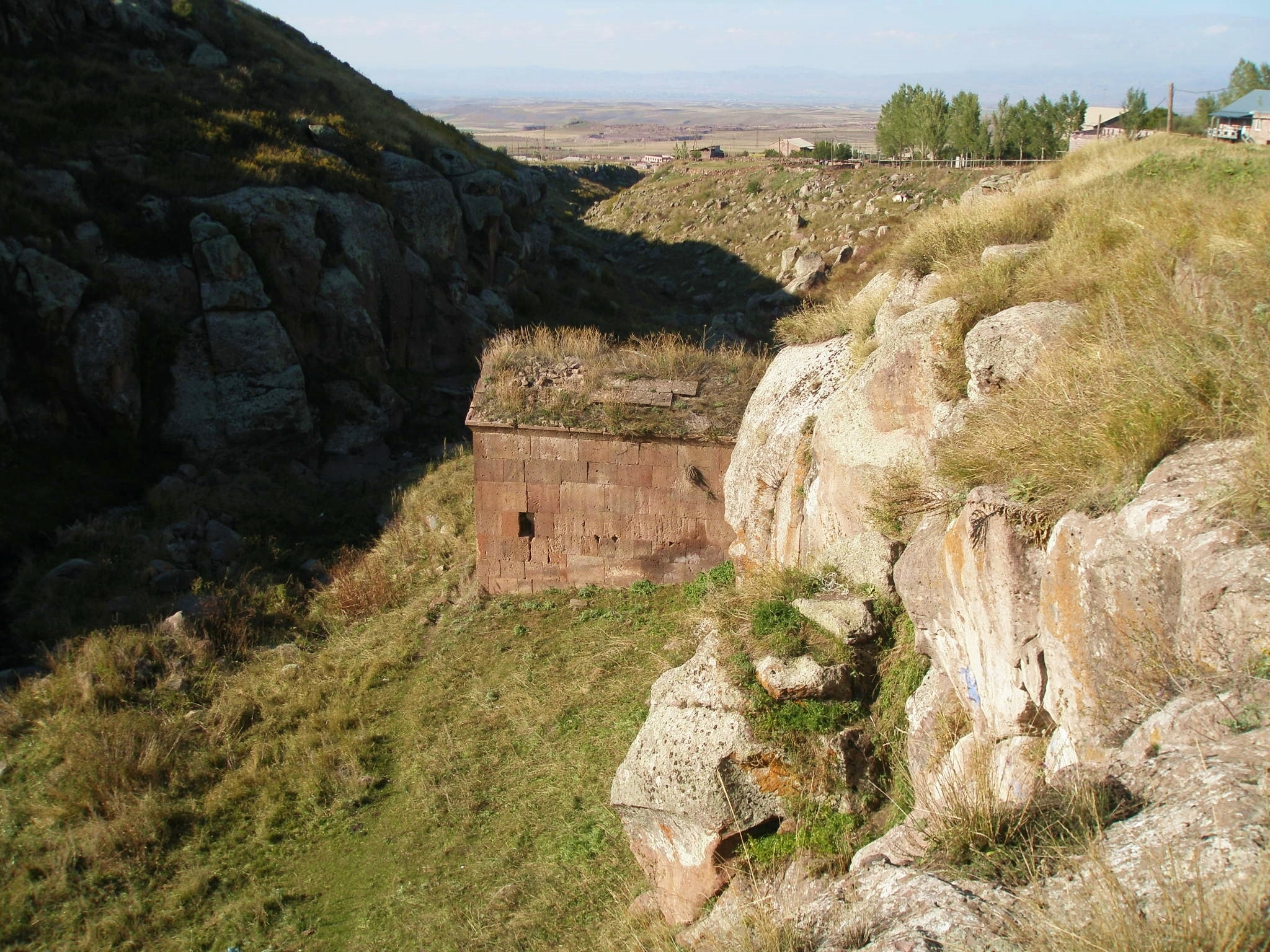
18th-century chapel in gorge below Makaravank
