= John Counter =

19th Century Canadian Businessman and Politician

John Counter (April 18, 1799 – October 29, 1862) was a Canadian businessman and political figure. He served as mayor of the City of Kingston, Ontario, for the terms 1841-43; 1846; 1850; 1852–53 and 1855.

== Personal life ==
John Counter was born on April 18, 1799, came to Kingston from Devonshire, England with his parents in 1820. He had an older brother George and younger sister Susannah. His parents were John and Susannah. He began his career in the family business as a baker and confectioner, with a bakery located at the corner of Barrie and Clergy Streets. After securing major local contracts to supply bread, he moved on to real estate investments and a variety of transportation and industrial enterprises with the goal to make Kingston a transportation hub. He married Hannah Rhode, aged 17 and they had four children. Within 10 years he lost his brother, two grandchildren, his two sons, and his wife, and finally he died, on October 29, 1862, in virtual obscurity and penniless, at the home of his son-in-law.

== Business affairs ==
John Counter was an avid businessman, and invested heavily in Kingston’s commercial district, was involved in the real estate and transportation industries, and owned both a foundry and a sawmill. He was involved in the Calvin Company which proposed a ferry to the railway in Cape Vincent, USA. This was before the construction of the Grand Trunk Railway, and Counter wanted to build and own an infrastructure that could be used to connect the two countries when the railway was finally built. He owned substantial waterfront rights and share in the Penny Bridge, later to become the La Salle Causeway. He also proposed building the Wolfe Island Canal (now abandoned) to provide quick water transportation to and from Cape Vincent. Counter promoted the incorporation of Kingston as a town judging that it would bring increased business and improve property values. This ambition was realized when he signed the petition which finally brought incorporation in 1838.

== Political career ==
He sought a council seat in the town’s first election but was defeated. Later, in 1841, he was among the first to propose building a new town hall in 1841. Architect George Browne was selected to design the new town hall, and he traveled to England to borrow £20,000 for its construction. In the same year he organized accommodations for government officials when Kingston became the home of the Parliament of the Province of Canada, giving up his own home to the vice-chancellor, R.S. Jameson, and renting the new offices of the Marine Railway to the government. Upon incorporation in 1846, Counter was elected the city’s first mayor, and served an additional four terms due to his popularity and influence. He was instrumental in establishing the Board of Trade in 1839. He was among the people who donated their homes for the new government workers in 1841, and the people who donated the first clock in the City Hall Clock Tower.

He supported the Wesleyan Methodists, and donated generously to the building fund for the Victoria Street chapel in 1847. He donated the land for Sydenham Street Church and laid the cornerstone on April 17, 1851. However, he had borrowed heavily to support his numerous interests and also to open the first subdivision in Kingston. He resigned from the office of mayor in June 1855 because his shares in the local gas company were considered to constitute a conflict of interest; and only a few months later, in October 1855, he could not meet a large mortgage payment and his financial obligations forced him into bankruptcy. His house was at Plymouth Square, at the corner of Ontario and Johnson Streets. It was torn down in 1973.

== Official portrait ==
Counter’s portrait was painted by American itinerant artist Alvah Bradish while he was visiting Kingston in 1842. Bradish was well known as a portrait painter in Rochester and Detroit, and is known to have undertaken commissions in Toronto and Montreal. Bradish advertised in the Kingston Chronicle in July 1842 that he was at Daley’s Hotel and offering his "professional services for a few weeks". Town Council members asked Mayor Counter to sit for his portrait, which was delivered in September 1842 at a cost of £17.10 and was paid for by the councilors personally, not from civic funds. He is depicted wearing a relatively simple Chain of Office and holding a scroll in left hand. It has been loaned to the Art Gallery of Ontario, where they made the existing slides of the painting that have been copied for archival institutions nationwide, and was stored at the City of Kingston facility at 19 Queen Street until it received restoration work in the late 1970s. It currently hangs in the John Counter meeting room at Kingston City Hall.

== See also ==
- List of mayors of Kingston, Ontario
