= Kingston City Hall (Ontario) =

City hall

Coordinates: 44.2299°N 76.4806°W

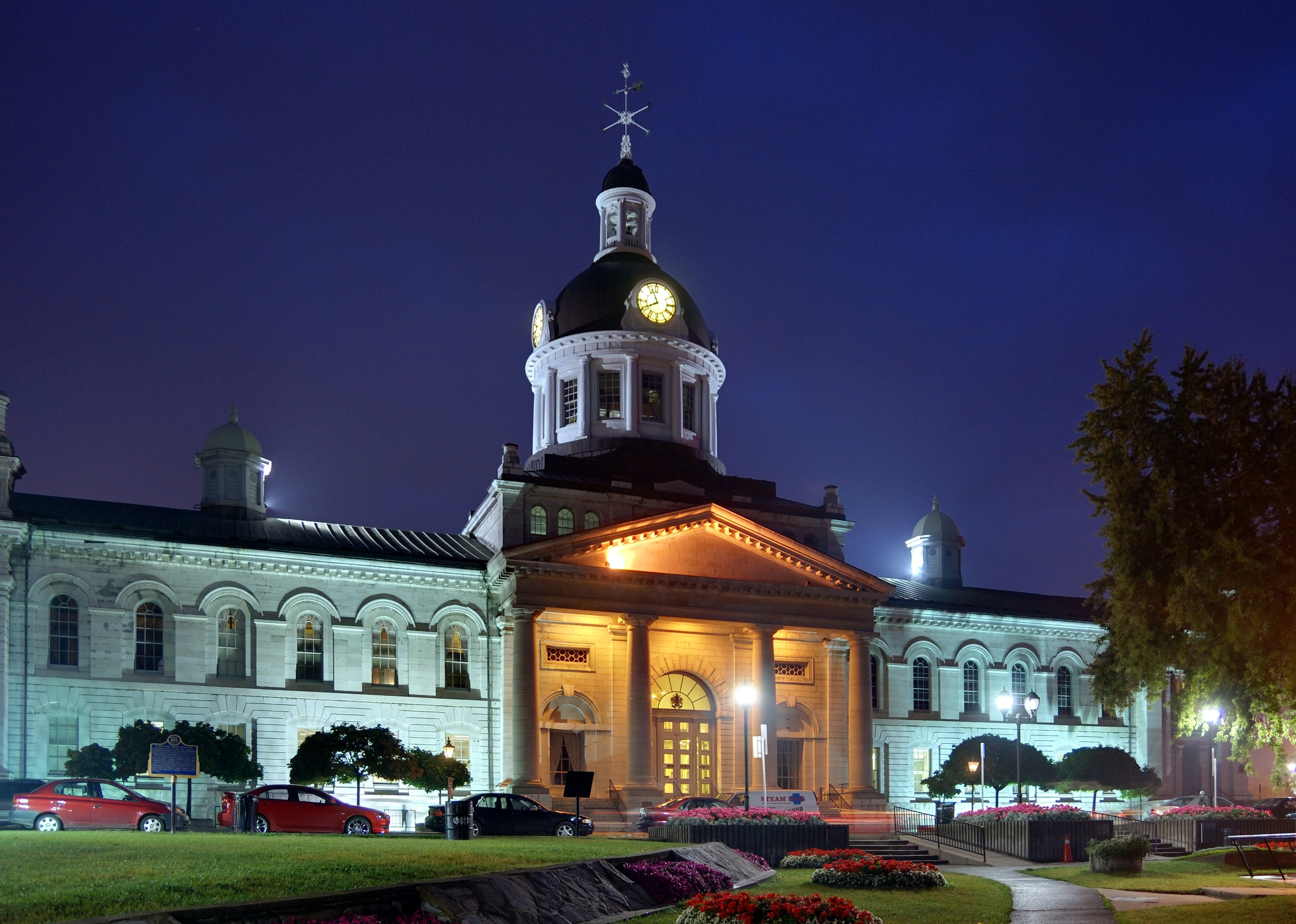
- Kingston City Hall, 2008
- Interactive map of Kingston City Hall
- Location: Kingston, Ontario, Canada
- Built: 1844
- Original use: City hall, market, custom house, post office, police station, jail, and other uses
- Current use: City hall
- Architect: George Browne
- Architectural style: Neoclassical
- Governing body: City of Kingston

National Historic Site of Canada
- Designated: 1961

Kingston City Hall is the seat of local government in Kingston, Ontario, Canada. Occupying a full city block facing Lake Ontario in Kingston's downtown, the city hall is a prominent building constructed in the Neoclassical style with a landmark tholobate and dome.

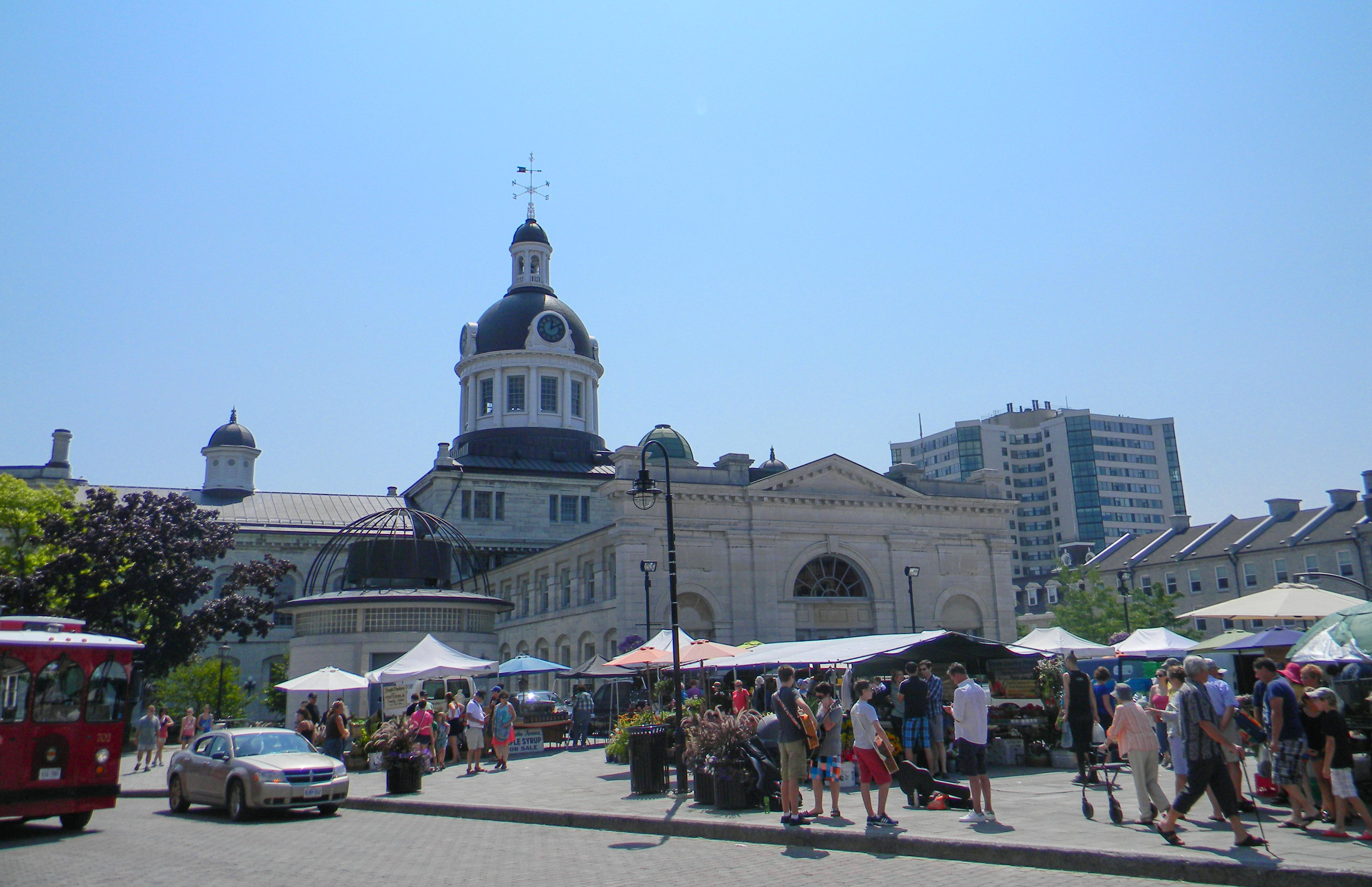
Market Square and Kingston City Hall, 2014

The city hall was completed in 1844, with its scale and design reflective of Kingston's status as the capital of the Province of Canada at that time. The architect chosen for the project in 1841 was George Browne, and the building was believed to be one of Browne's most outstanding works.

The building was designated a National Historic Site of Canada in 1961.

== History ==
On 18 April 1840 a fire destroyed much of the downtown section of Kingston, including the market area, the market building, and the original municipal offices located in the Baker Building on King Street facing Market Square. Mayor John Counter proposed a new market building and municipal building. Since Kingston was, at the time, the capital of the new Province of Canada, the appearance of the new town hall was planned to reflect the city’s status as the capital.

Architect George Browne, who had moved to Kingston from Quebec with the new government, won the design contest and drew the plans. He also took charge of construction. The final phase of construction, however, was overseen by William Coverdale after Browne was dismissed. The cornerstone was laid on 5 June 1843 by Governor General Charles Metcalfe at the location of the market overlooking the waterfront. The building was completed by November 1844.

The new city hall was constructed of limestone in the form of a T and incorporated a new market building that extended west toward King Street. Known as the market "shambles", this wing of the city hall was designed as a public market and was used by hucksters, butchers and green grocers who occupied stalls. The market wing also included a clock tower. In 1865 the wing was destroyed by a fire. It was rebuilt with a smaller configuration but without the clock tower, and the clock was placed into the main dome. A fire in 1908 destroyed the main dome, which was reconstructed with a new clock.

Since Kingston entered into a recession when the seat of government moved to Montreal in May 1844, town council was concerned about paying for the large building and so began renting out space. Tenants included the post office, customs offices, the Masons, the Orange Order, a saloon, a dry goods store, an amateur theatre, the Mechanics Institute, the Bank of British North America, and the Scottish Free Church. The west wing was rented out for lectures, meetings, bazaars and balls. Welfare recipients were housed in the basement but this proved to be unsuccessful and the tenants were evicted.

The portico at the front entrance was removed in 1956 because of deterioration but was restored in 1966. To commemorate Kingston's tercentenary in 1973, the interior of the building was renovated and restored.

Memorial Hall, located in the north wing, includes twelve stained glass windows that pay tribute to those who fought in several First World War battles.

John A. Macdonald, Canada's first prime minister, lay in state here following his death on 6 June 1891.

== Police headquarters ==
Kingston’s police force set up its headquarters in the basement of City Hall as soon as the building opened in 1844. The space consisted of a large room, four cells and the Police Court. In the early 1900s, the police offices and Police Court moved to the main floor. In 1952 the police offices moved into two floors of the attached Market Building, which had been renovated. Police holding cells were located on the main floor, while the second floor housed the main offices and Magistrate’s Court. As the force expanded, it outgrew its allotted space and so the police headquarters moved into a separate building, which was completed in 1972. It has since moved into even larger quarters.

== Market Square ==
Springer Market Square, located directly behind city hall, holds a seasonal farmers' market, the Kingston Public Market, on Tuesdays, Thursdays and Saturdays from April until November, although in the early years the market was held summer and winter. It is the oldest public market in the province. An antiques market operates in the square on Sundays. The square was revitalized during 2005–07, creating an outdoor skating rink and small amphitheatres in the north and south courtyards of city hall.

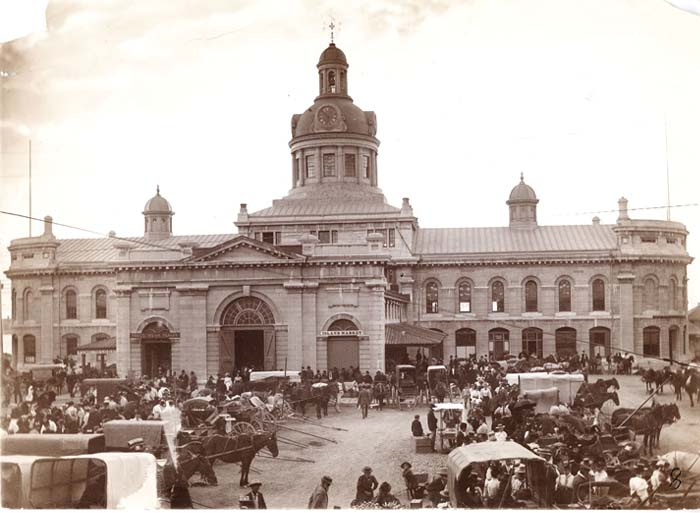
Market Square and Kingston City Hall, ca. 1900

Market Square was created as part of the original town plan of 1784 and was the site of an informal market established in 1788. The square originally extended to the waterfront. It was the only location in Kingston where farmers could sell their produce, which was brought in by wagon or cart. The Kingston Public Market was officially established by the City of Kingston in 1801, and the rules and regulations were proclaimed in May 1811. It was the centre of commerce and trade in the city and through the 19th century public buildings, hotels, and shops developed around the square including Kingston City Hall which was built in 1844. As the city grew, the market came to consist of ramshackle wooden stalls known as the market shambles, which were destroyed, along with many of the surrounding buildings, in the Great Fire of 1840. After the fire, the market area was rebuilt with a new market building, which was attached to the new city hall. The market was deeded to the city in 1848.

In 1758 British Colonel John Bradstreet's infantry used the site when they bombarded the French Fort Frontenac during the Battle of Fort Frontenac. The square was the location where the first Lieutenant Governor of Upper Canada, John Graves Simcoe, proclaimed the Constitutional Act 1791 which established Upper Canada as a separate jurisdiction, where the beginning of the War of 1812 was announced, and in 1867, was the location where Canadian Confederation was proclaimed. The square was also used as an assembly point for soldiers who participated in the North-West Rebellion and fought in the First and Second World Wars.

Archaeological investigations that took place in 2002 and 2003 in preparation for the revitalization project uncovered evidence of old commercial buildings, the old market and market wing, remnants of part of the nearby Fort Frontenac, and signs of the two major fires that occurred in 1840 and 1865.

Market Square was renamed "Springer" Market Square in 2008 to recognize the donation of $1 million to the City of Kingston by the Springer family to help pay for the revitalization of the square.

== Confederation Park ==
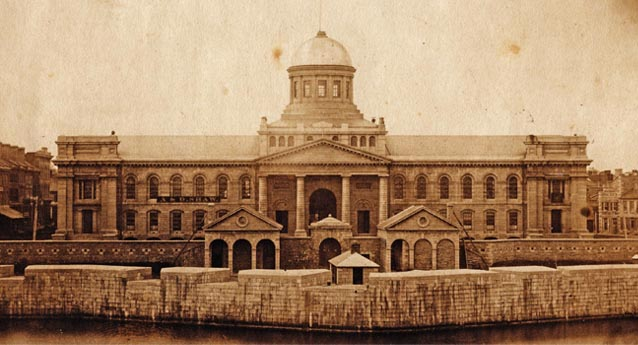
Kingston City Hall and the Market Battery, 1857

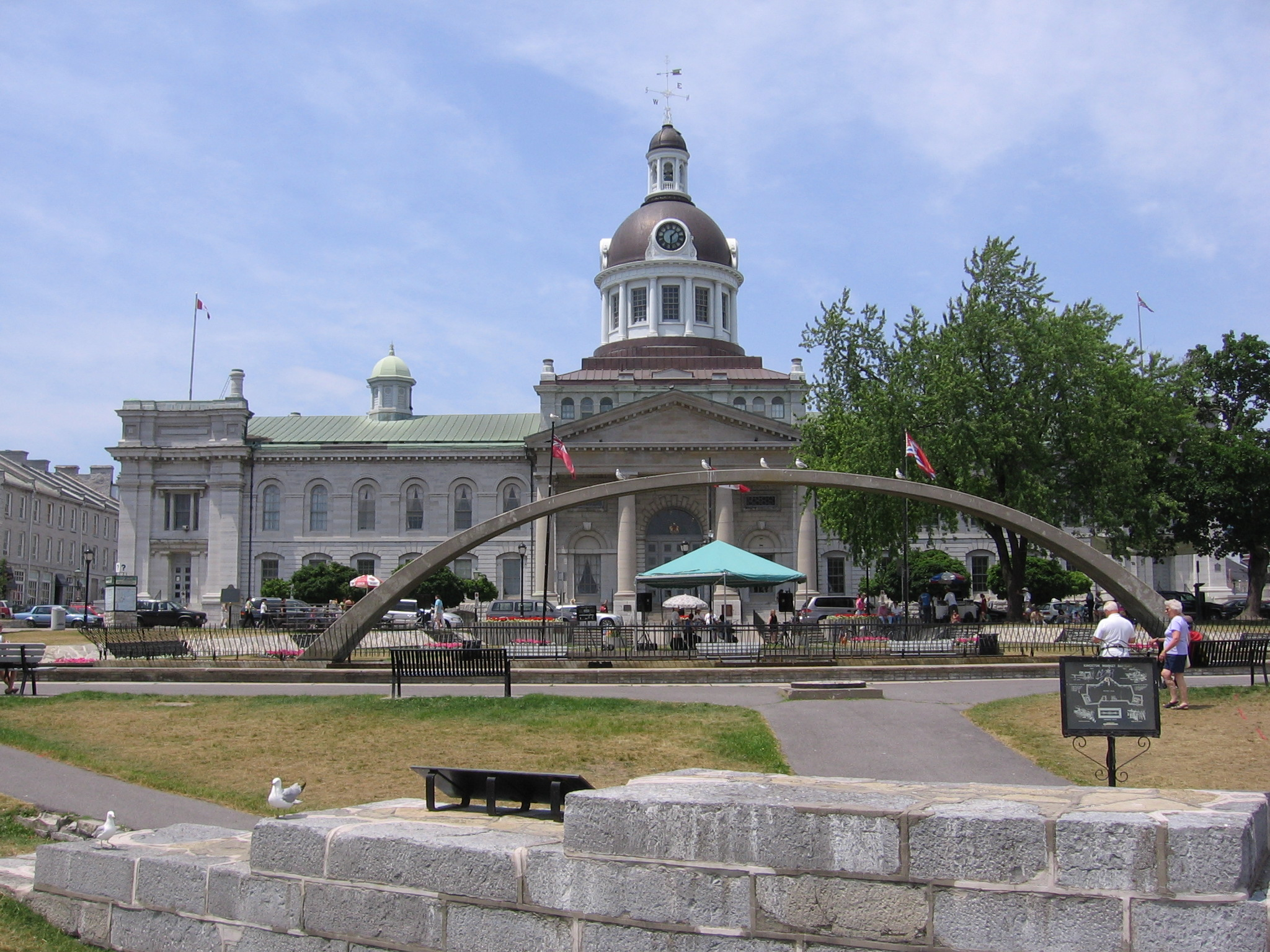
Confederation Park, Kingston City Hall and a reconstructed wall of the Market Battery

Confederation Park, which is associated with Kingston City Hall, separates the city hall from the waterfront. Established in 1967 on formerly-industrial waterfront land, it includes a large arch with a fountain and the Confederation Basin Marina. A former Kingston and Pembroke Railway (K&P) station which once served as the southern terminus of the now-defunct line is now a visitor information centre operated by Tourism Kingston. A restored historic locomotive, the "Spirit of Sir John A.", recalls downtown Kingston's past role in locomotive manufacturing.

=== Market Battery ===
A fortification known as the Market Battery, was located on the waterfront directly in front of City Hall where Confederation Park is located. It was completed in 1848 because of tension between the United States and Great Britain during the Oregon Crisis. The Market Battery was one of several Kingston fortifications constructed during this period. A thick outer wall, or sea wall, in the harbour extended 20 feet above the water and included embrasures for cannons, while an inner wall, which included an entrance, completed the battery's enclosure to the west. In the 1870s, after Imperial troops withdrew from Kingston, the inner wall was removed and the location became a park. The large outer wall was removed in 1885 and the land was leased to the K&P railroad. A wall of the battery has been restored to illustrate the site's history.

== Appearances in popular culture ==
Kingston City Hall appears in the 1999 HBO movie, Vendetta.

Kingston City Hall, Market Square, and the surrounding buildings appear as part of a Russian city in the fourteenth episode of the television series, Nikita's, third season, The Life We've Chosen in 2013.

Kingston City Hall also appears briefly as an unnamed government building in Buffalo, New York, in 2015's Crimson Peak.

Kingston City Hall and Market Square appeared on the seventh episode of The Amazing Race Canada 4 in 2016.

Kingston City Hall and Market Square appeared in the Murdoch Mysteries episode "Rigid Silence" in 2020.

== See also ==
- Frontenac County Court House
- Kingston Police Force
- Kingston Ontario
