= James Caughey =

Irish Methodist minister (1810–1891)

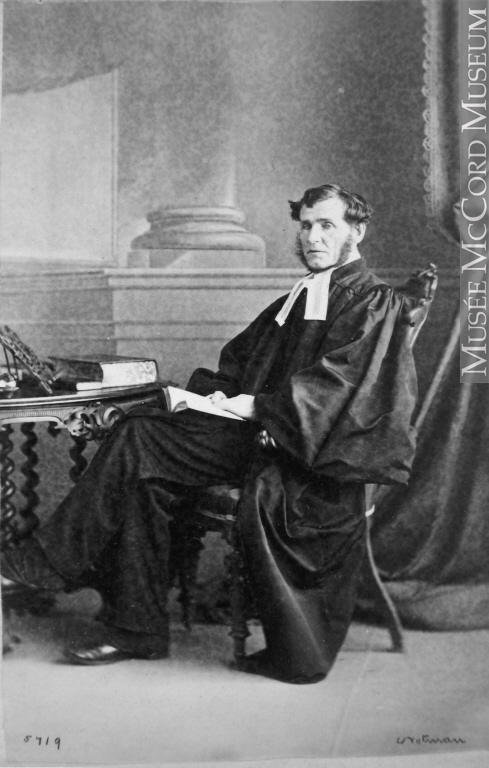
- James Caughey, Montreal, 1863
- Born: 9 April 1810; Ireland
- Died: 30 January 1891 (aged 80); Highland Park, New Jersey, US
- Occupation: Methodist minister
- Known for: Evangelism

James Caughey (9 April 1810 – 30 January 1891) was a Methodist minister and evangelist who was active in the United States, England and Canada. An imposing and effective preacher, he conducted highly emotional revival meetings at which many of his audience were converted or reaffirmed their faith. This brought him into some conflict with the more respectable members of the Methodist church in Britain.

== Life ==
James Caughey was born of Scottish parents in the north of Ireland on 9 April 1810. His family immigrated to Troy, New York in the early 1820s. In 1830, Caughey was employed there in a large flour mill. Caughey was converted to Methodism at a revival in Troy in 1830, and in 1832 was accepted as a probationary preacher by the American Methodist Episcopal Church. In 1834, he received a deacon's orders and was made a minister in Burlington, Vermont. In 1835, Caughey made a three month evangelist campaign in Montreal. In 1836, he was ordained as an elder of the Methodist Episcopal Church. Caughey experienced a personal baptism of the Spirit in July 1839. He moved to Quebec City in October 1840 and served as a minister there for three months, and then as a minister in Montreal.

Caughey left Montreal in March 1841 and travelled via Saint John, New Brunswick to Halifax, Nova Scotia, from where he sailed to England in late July 1841. Caughey preached in Britain with much success from 1841 to 1847. He mainly preached among Methodists in the midlands and north of England, and came to be called the "King of Revivalist Preachers". During this spell in Britain, Caughey claimed that he saw "20,000 profess faith in Christ and 10,000 profess sanctification." William Booth encountered Caughey in Nottingham during this period, and was later to found the Salvation Army. Caughey aroused controversy, since his highly emotional evangelistic style clashed with the middle-class respectability of many members of the English Methodist church. He left England reluctantly in 1847 at the urging of the church leadership.

Caughey returned to his base in Burlington, Vermont. Caughey visited Toronto in late November 1851, and stayed there for almost eight months, preaching seven sermons a week. In that period, 2,000 people were converted, including many non-Methodists, and the membership of Toronto's Wesleyan Methodist churches rose from 714 to 1,537. Until 1856, Caughey continued to spend each winter in the Canadas. He visited Kingston in the fall of 1852. Hundreds of people came to hear him speak at the Sydenham Street Methodist Church, and it is said that he was directly responsible for almost four hundred conversions or experiences of sanctification. Caughey preached his last sermon at the church on 13 March 1853. He had similar success in Hamilton in March 1853. In the following years he preached in Montreal, London, Ontario, Belleville and Brockville.

Caughey returned to Britain in 1857 for two years, with much success, and made further visits in 1860 and in the mid 1860s. After his health failed, Caughey retired to Highland Park, New Jersey. In 1886, he was visited there by his old pupil William Booth. Caughey died in Highland Park on 30 January 1891 at the age of 80.

== Beliefs and influence ==
Caughey belonged to the Holiness movement. He therefore thought that justification and sanctification, in which a person's sins were forgiven and they became pure in God's sight, could be obtained instantly from a seeker who requested them from God in faith. He would appeal to the unconverted to make a first commitment to God, and to the converted to make a re-committal so as to receive the fullness of God's blessing.

Caughey had an imposing figure and face, a forceful personality, a quick wit and great eloquence. His example and influence laid the groundwork for the holiness and Pentecostal movements. Caughey, like other American revivalists such as Charles Grandison Finney and Phoebe Palmer who preached in England in the 1840s, followed a "scientific" approach to converting sinners. They rented halls, advertised their meetings, preached and prayed for defined ends, encouraged sinners to confess openly at the communion rail, and trained their converts to bring others to the faith. Caughey was the first professional evangelist to campaign in the Canadas, and established a model for successors such as Dwight L. Moody. He influenced young men such as Albert Carman and Nathanael Burwash to become ministers, and thus had lasting influence on the Methodist church in Canada. However, Caughey is best known for his revival activity in Britain in the 1840s. Through the guidance he gave to Booth and others he had huge influence on evangelism in that country.

== Publications ==
Publications include:

- Rev. James Caughey (1846). Parting sermon of the Rev. James Caughey . . . delivered in Sans Street Chapel, Sunderland, on Friday evening Sept. 4, 1846. Sunderland, England.
- Rev. James Caughey (1847). Report of a farewell sermon delivered in the Methodist New Connexion Chapel . . . Nottingham, by the Rev. J. Caughey . . . to which is added, an epitome of his farewell address at Sheffield, and an account of his embarkation at Liverpool. Nottingham, England.
- Rev. James Caughey (1847). A voice from America; or, four sermons . . . reported by a Manchester minister (2 ed.). Manchester.
- Rev. James Caughey (1850). Letters on various subjects (5v., London, 1844–47); Methodism in earnest: being the history of a great revival in Great Britain; in which twenty thousand souls were justified, and ten thousand sanctified, in about six years, through the instrumentality of Rev. James Caughey . . . Boston.
- Rev. James Caughey (1854). Helps to a life of holiness and usefulness, or revival miscellanies . . . selected from the works of the Rev. James Caughey . . . , ed. R. W. Allen and Daniel Wise. Toronto.
- Rev. James Caughey (1855). Earnest Christianity illustrated; or, selections from the journal of the Rev. J. Caughey . . . with a brief sketch of Mr. Caughey's life by the Rev. Daniel Wise. London, Ontario.
- Rev. James Caughey (1857). Showers of blessing from clouds of mercy; selected from the journal and other writings of the Rev. James Caughey . . . Toronto.
- Rev. James Caughey (1857). The triumph of truth, and continental letters and sketches, from the journal, letters, and sermons of the Rev. James Caughey . . . Philadelphia.
- Rev. James Caughey (1860). Conflicts with skepticism: or, the Christian's ally in collision with unbelief and unbelievers in the various departments of Christian labor . . . Boston.
- Rev. James Caughey (1868). Arrows from my quiver; pointed with the steel of truth and winged by faith and love; selected from the private papers of Rev. J. Caughey. intro. Daniel Wise. New York.
- Rev. James Caughey (1868). Glimpses of life in soul-saving; or, selections from the journal and other writings of the Rev. James Caughey, intro. Daniel Wise. New York.

== Sources ==
- Bush, Peter (1 January 1990). "CAUGHEY, JAMES". Dictionary of Canadian Biography, 1891-1900. Springer Science & Business Media. ISBN 978-0-8020-3460-1.
- Cauchi, Tony (January 2009). "James Caughey - 1810-1891".
- Caughey, James (1855). "Earnest Christianity". Archived from the original on 24 April 2013.
- Murdoch, Norman H. (1 August 1996). Origins of the Salvation Army. Univ. of Tennessee Press. ISBN 978-0-87049-955-5.
- Rawlyk, George A. (1 January 1993). Wrapped Up in God: A Study of Several Canadian Revivals and Revivalists. McGill-Queen's Press - MQUP. ISBN 978-0-7735-1131-6.
- Smithers, David (2014). "James Caughey". Awake and Go!.
