= William Coverdale (architect) =

- Born: c. 1801; England
- Died: 28 September 1865; Kingston, Ontario, Canada
- Occupations: Architect; Master Builder
- Known for: Renowned architect in Upper Canada

William Coverdale (c. 1801 – 28 September 1865) was an English-born builder and architect in Canada West.

== Personal life ==
The son of Christopher Coverdale, the family is thought to have arrived in Lower Canada around 1810 before coming to Kingston, Upper Canada around 1833. Coverdale married Catherine Delmage and had five children. Unlike his many Anglican contemporaries, Coverdale was a practicing member of the Wesleyan Methodist Church.

== Career ==
Coverdale worked as master builder on the construction of Kingston Penitentiary from 1836–1840, and was involved in the later additions of the dining hall, perimeter walls, and towers in the mid-1840s. When Kingston city architect George Browne was discharged on 20 May 1855, Coverdale was hired to replace him.

He oversaw the construction of Kingston City Hall from 1844 and prepared plans for the rebuilding of the rear wing after it burned down in 1865; the rebuilding was completed by his son William Miles Coverdale.

In 1859, Coverdale was hired as architect for the Government of Canada's Criminal Lunatic Asylum.

He designed plans for several large residences and a number of churches in Kingston, many of which are still in use today.

== Death ==
Coverdale died in Kingston in 1865 at the age of 64, with his most reputable building, Rockwood Asylum, only partially complete.

== Designated heritage buildings ==
Building	Address	Built
Kingston Penitentiary	560 King St W	1836
St. Helen's Complex: St. Helen's	440 King St W	1838
Roselawn National Historic Site of Canada	421 Union St W	1841
Noble Palmer House	131-133 King St E	1842
St. George's Anglican Cathedral (addition)	270 King St E	1843
Willow Cottage	189 King St W	1843
Greystone Manor	178-180 Johnson St	1843
St. James Anglican Church	10 Union St	1845
St. Paul's Anglican Church	137 Queen St	1847
Prince George Hotel (addition)	200 Ontario St	1848
St. John the Evangelist Anglican Church	41 Church St	1849
Agnes Maule Machar Home	169 Earl St	1849
William and Mary Beamish House	2263 Princess St	1850
Anglican Diocesan Centre in Kingston	90 Johnson St	1851
Sydenham Street United Church	82 Sydenham St	1852
Maxwell Strange Cottage	107 Logan St	1855
Portsmouth Community Correctional Centre	508 Portsmouth Ave	1855
Anchor Insurance Building	327 King St E	1857
Louise House	329 Johnson St	1857
Bajus Brewery (addition 1)	308 Wellington St	1857
Richard Cartwright House	165 King St E	1858
Rockwood Asylum	752 King St W	1859
222 Johnson St	222 Johnson St	1860
Bajus Brewery (addition 2)	308 Wellington St	1861
Portsmouth Town Hall	623 King St W	1865
