= Tholobate =

Architectural feature on domes

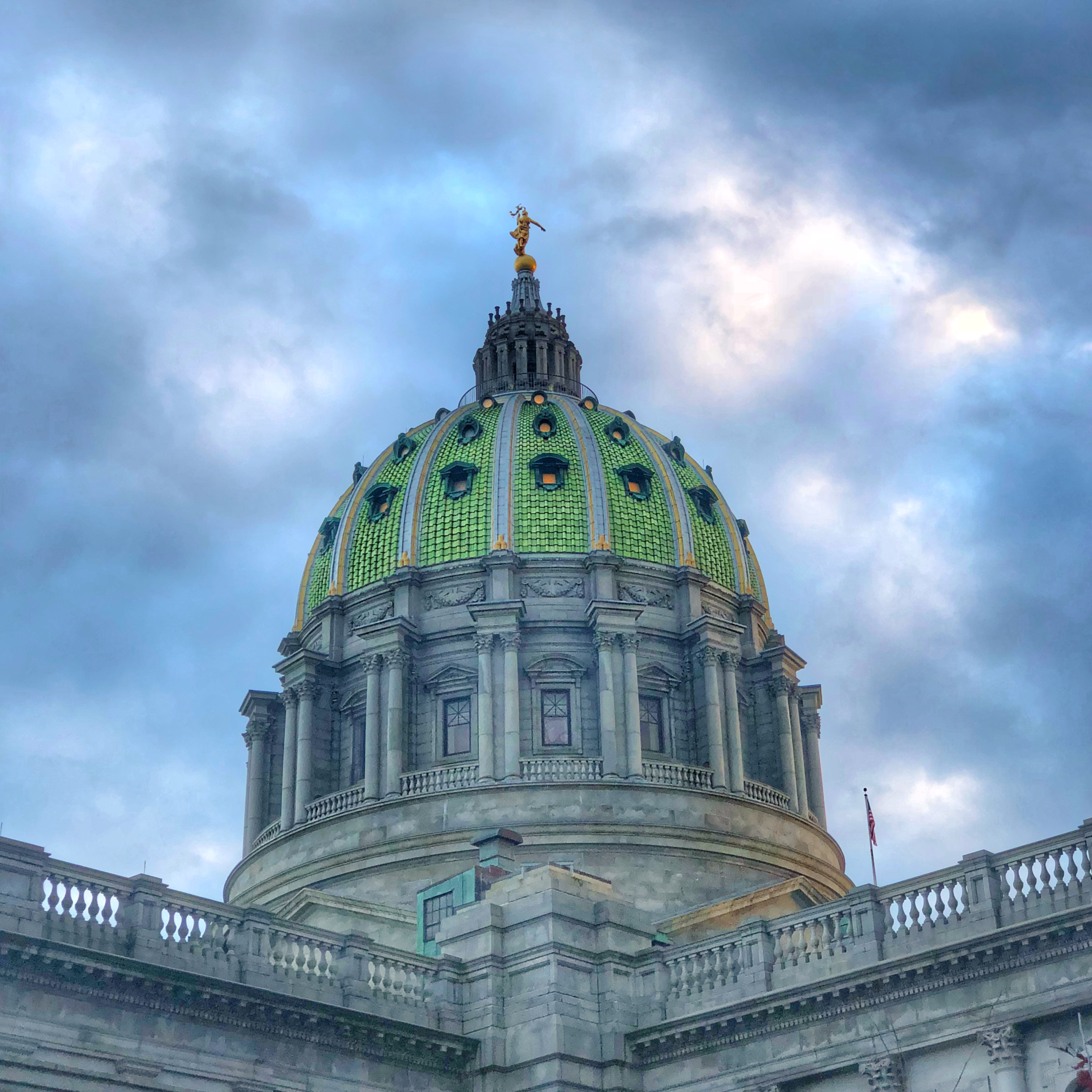
Dome upon tholobate of the Pennsylvania State Capitol, Harrisburg

A tholobate (from Ancient Greek θολοβάτης (tholobátēs) 'dome pedestal'), also called a drum or tambour, is the upright part of a building on which a dome is raised. It is generally in the shape of a cylinder or a polygonal prism. The name derives from the tholos, the Greek term for a round building with a roof and a circular wall. Another architectural meaning of drum is a circular section of a column shaft.

== Examples ==
In the earlier Byzantine church architecture the dome rested directly on the pendentives and the windows were pierced in the dome itself; in later examples, an intervening circular wall containing windows was built between the pendentive and the dome. This is the type which was universally employed by the architects of the Renaissance, of whose works the best-known example is St. Peter's Basilica at Rome. Other examples of churches of this type are St Paul's Cathedral in London and the churches of the Les Invalides, the Val-de-Grâce, and the Sorbonne in Paris.

Tholobates are also used in secular buildings: the United States Capitol dome in Washington, D.C., is set on a drum, a feature imitated in numerous American state capitols. The Panthéon in Paris is another secular building featuring a dome on a drum. St Paul's Cathedral and the Panthéon were the two inspirations for the U.S. Capitol. In contrast, the dome of the Reichstag building in Berlin before its post-war restoration was a quadrilateral, so its tholobate was square and not round.

== Gallery ==
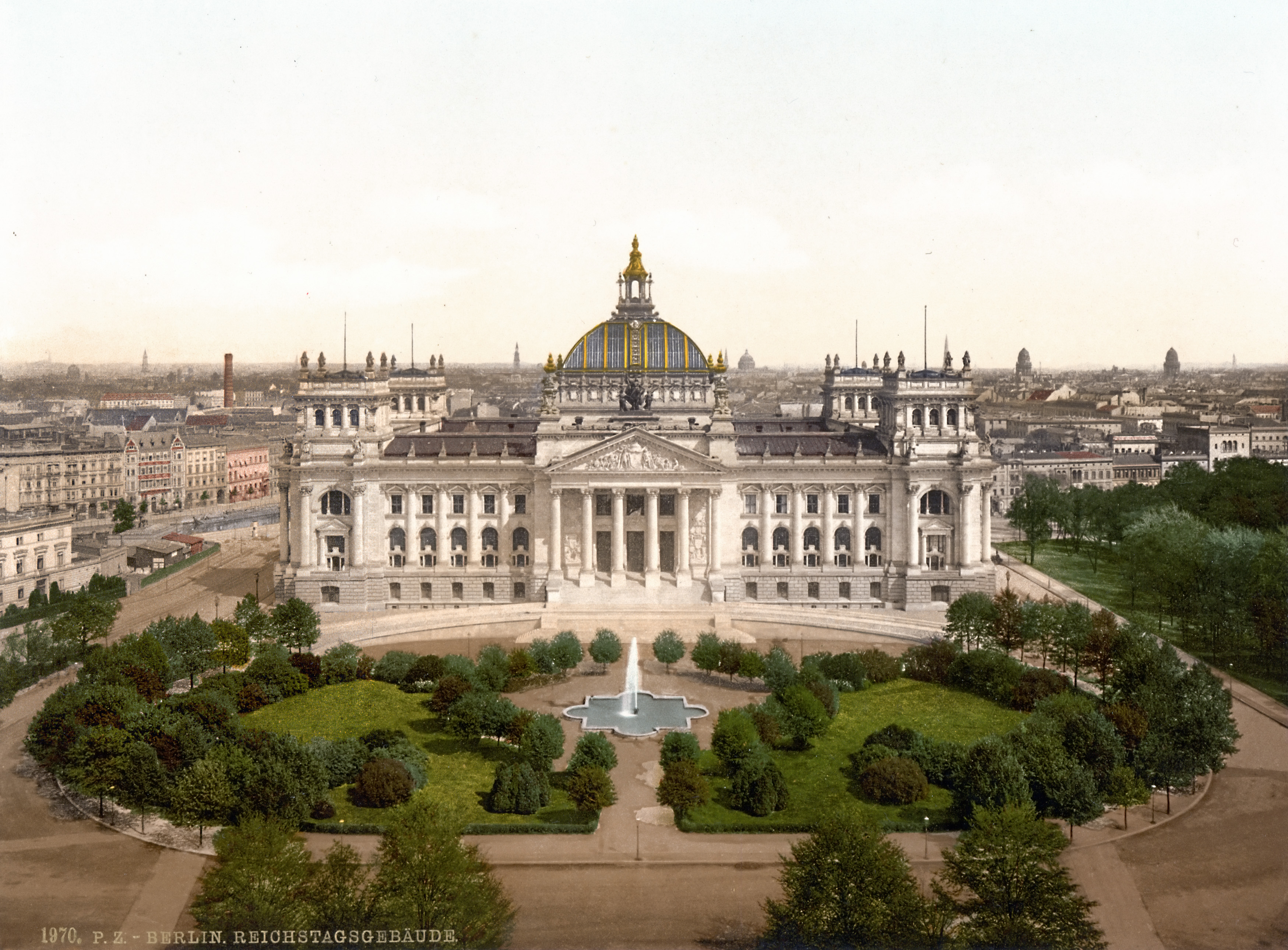
The Reichstag in Berlin, with a square tholobate (Photochrom Zürich, ca. 1894)

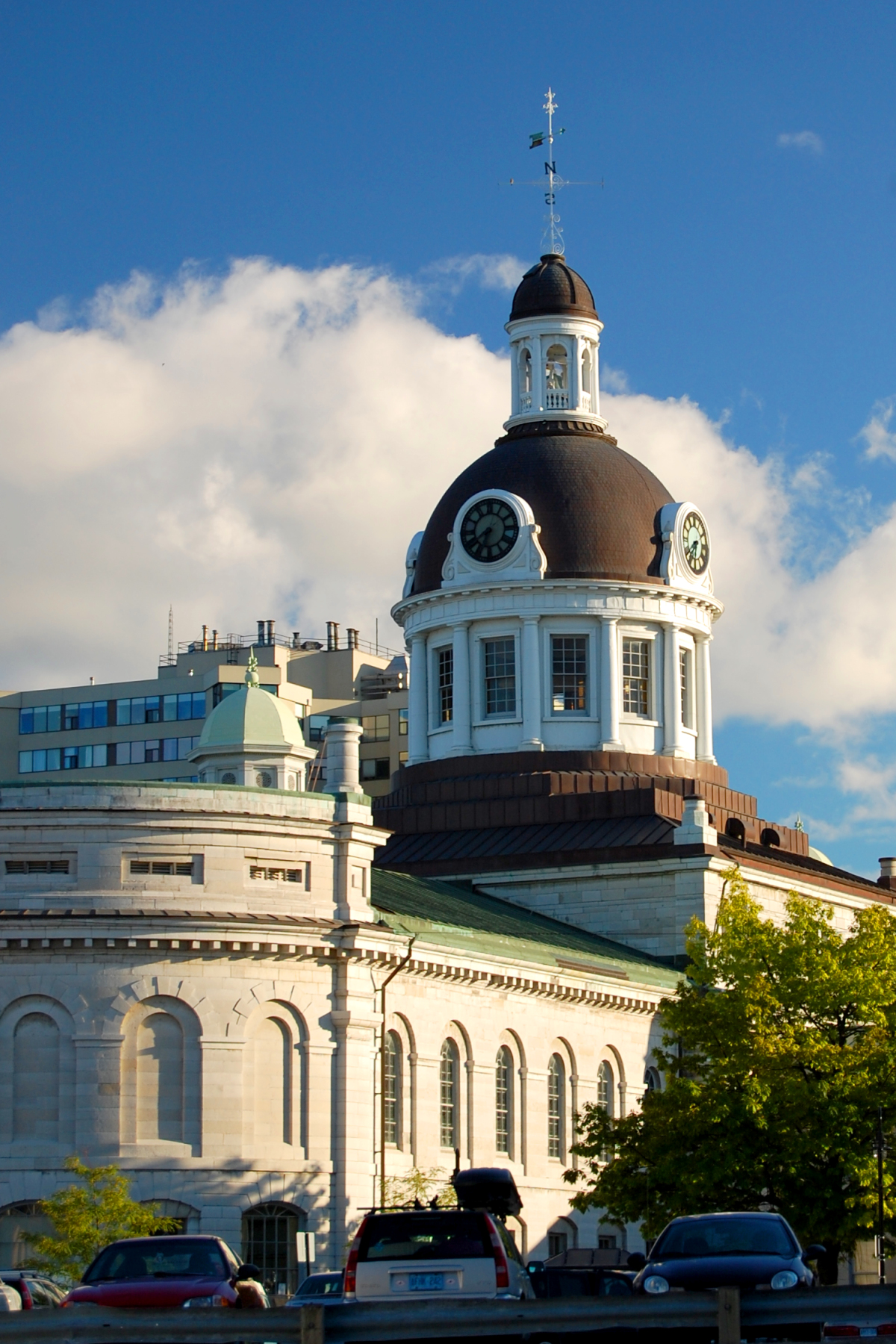
Tholobate atop Kingston City Hall in Canada

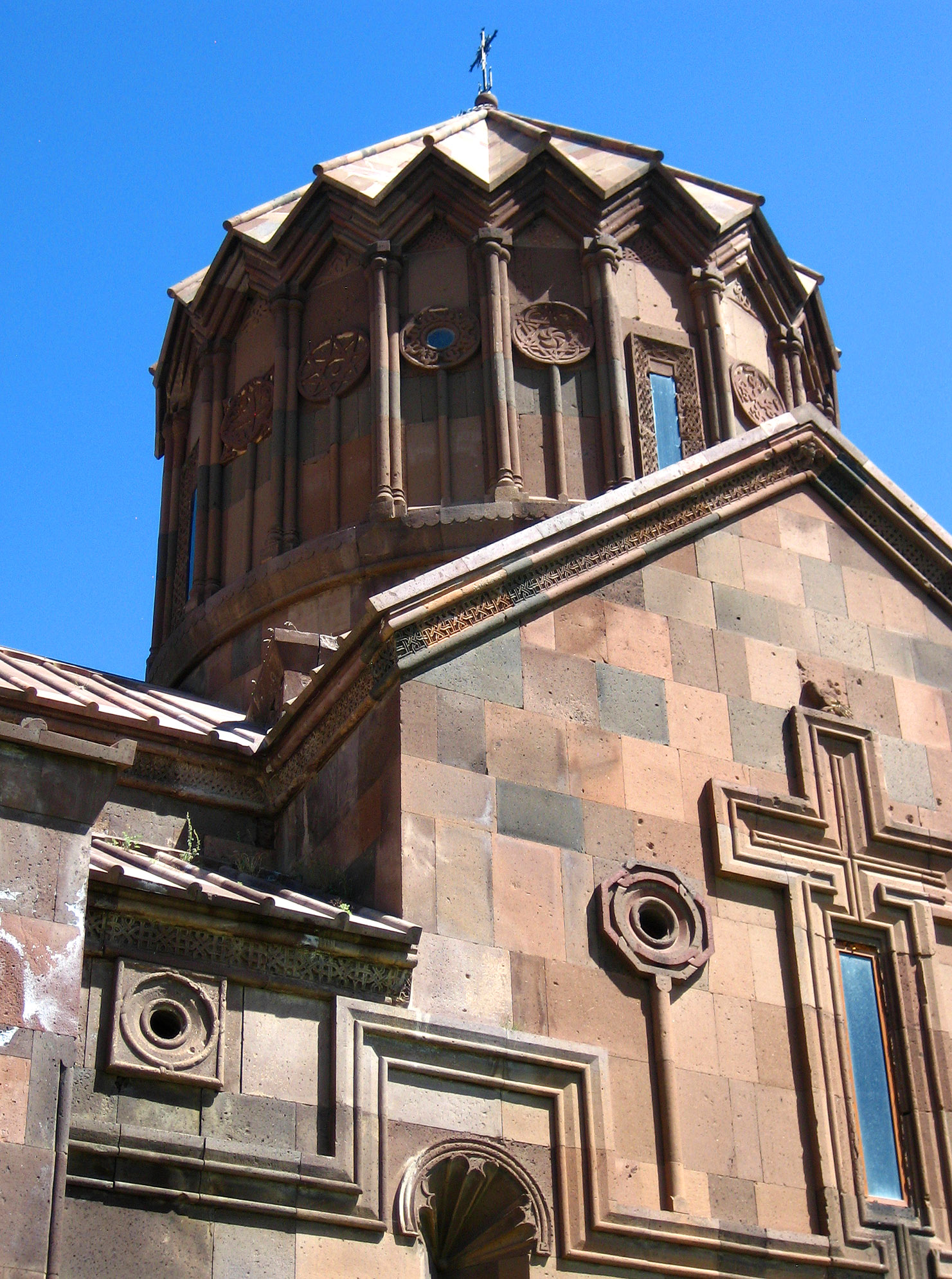
Tholobate on Harichavank Monastery in Armenia

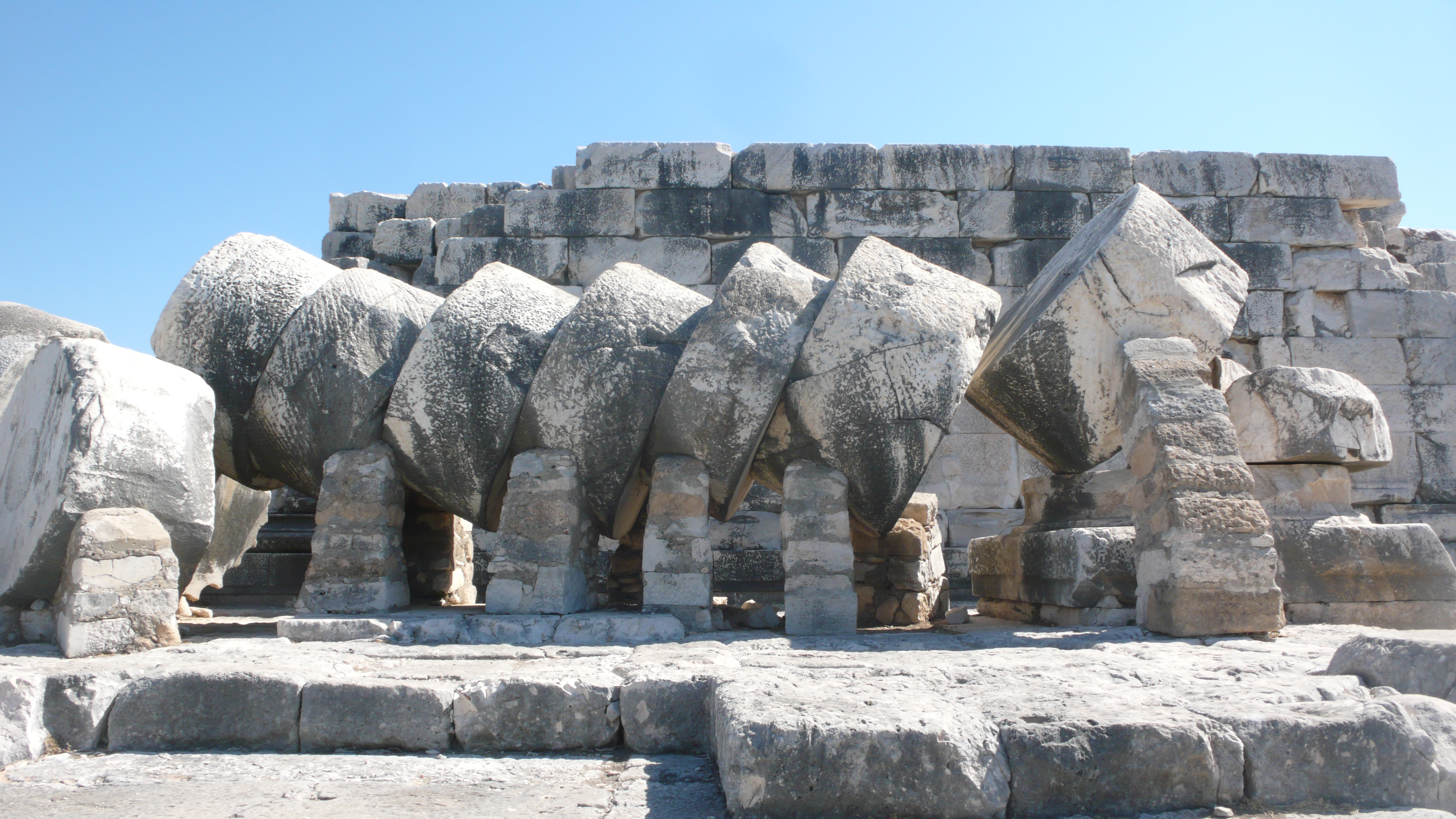
A row of Greek column drums (unfinished), at the Temple of Apollo, Didyma

== See also ==
- Cupola - a smaller tholobate with a dome
- Roof lanterns are sometimes placed above a dome
