= Kingston Center =

Kingston Center or Kingston Centre may refer to:

- Kingston Center, Ohio, an unincorporated community
- Kingston Center Historic District, in Massachusetts
- Kingston Centre, a shopping mall in Canada
