= Kingston station (Ontario) =

Railway station for Kingston, Ontario, Canada

Kingston
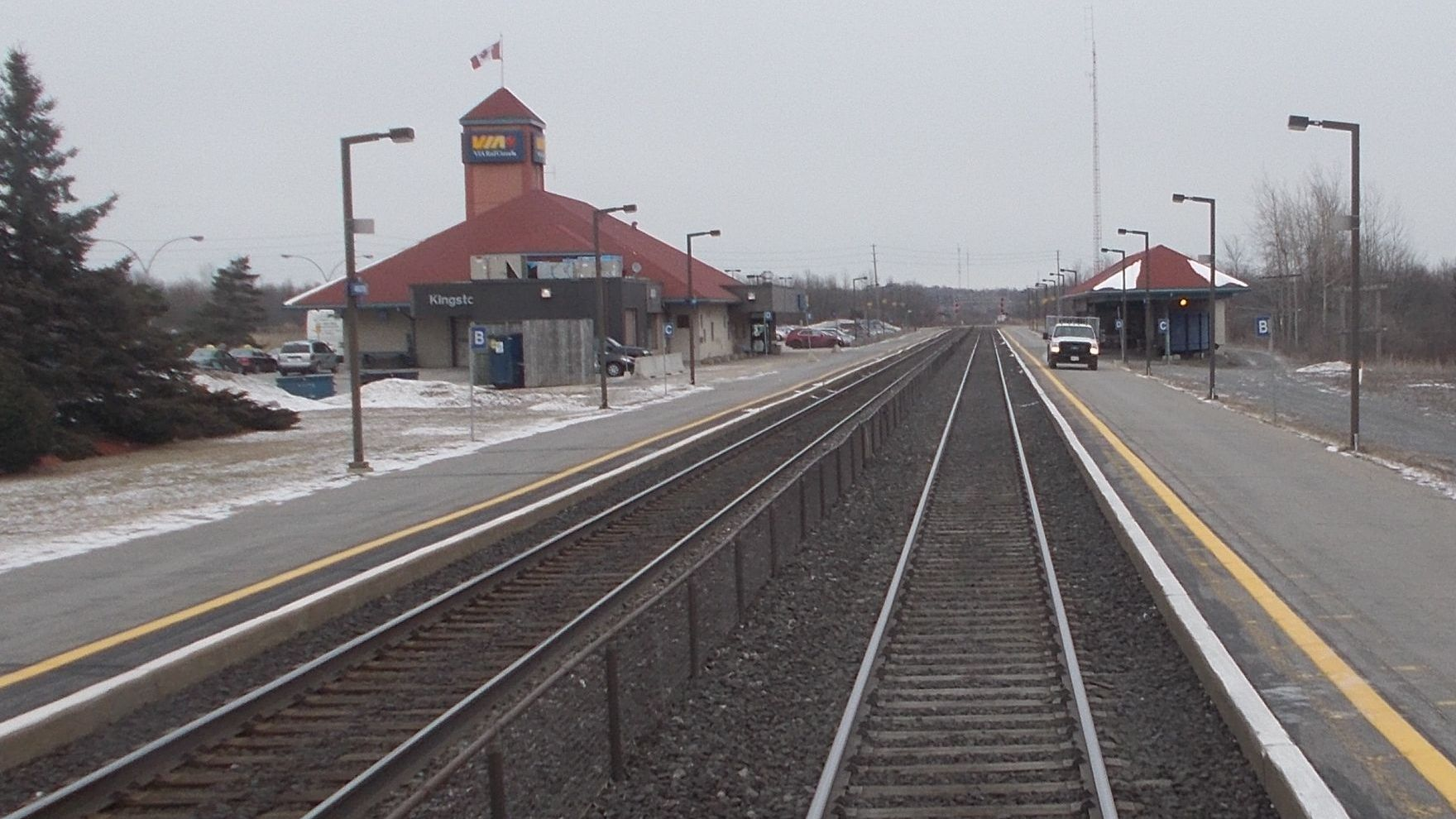

General information
- Location: 1800 John Counter Boulevard; Kingston, Ontario; Canada
- Coordinates: 44°15′26″N 76°32′13″W
- Platforms: 2 side platforms
- Tracks: 2
- Connections: Kingston Transit

Construction
- Structure type: Staffed station
- Accessible: yes

Other information
- Status: Staffed station
- Website: Kingston train station

History
- Opened: 1974; 52 years ago

Services
Preceding station	Via Rail	Following station
Napanee toward Toronto	Toronto–Ottawa	Gananoque toward Ottawa
Belleville toward Toronto	Toronto–Montreal	Brockville toward Montreal
Location
- Location within Southern Ontario Location within Ontario Location within Canada

The Kingston railway station is an inter-city passenger rail station in Cataraqui, Kingston, Ontario, Canada. It is served by Via Rail trains running from Toronto to Ottawa or Montreal, along the Corridor route. It is located on John Counter Boulevard, northeast of Princess Street and northwest of downtown Kingston.

== Station facilities ==
As the largest station between Toronto and Ottawa, the station is staffed, with a ticket counter, vending machines, payphones, washrooms, and accessibility services. There are two platforms, the second of which is accessed down an escalator and through a tunnel, and is stanchioned off when train arrivals are not imminent.

Short-term parking is available on the west side of the station. Long-term parking is available on the east side of the station. An Indigo parking machine is situated on the southeast corner of the station, near Track #1. Passengers are also able to pay for parking with the Indigo App, with several signs with QR codes located in the station and on the platform.

The Via station is also served by Kingston Public Transit. Busses 2, 7 and 11 make frequent stops at or nearby the train station.

== History ==
CN's Montréal-Toronto mainline, opened October 27, 1856 as the Grand Trunk Railway, was built in three sections: Montréal built a subdivision westward to Brockville, Toronto built eastward to Oshawa, and Kingston built both east and west to bridge the gap. A "Grand Trunk village" of buildings around the 1855 two-storey stone Outer Station (810 Montreal Street) served as a regional base of operations during the initial construction and operation of the line, even though this location was awkwardly a 3 miles (4.8 km) stagecoach ride north from downtown Kingston at the time.

The current station opened west of Kingston's then-city limits in 1974, replacing CN's historic Grand Trunk station buildings in the city's north end. Relocating the station allowed CN to shift mainline track further north, eliminating a long curve to the south. Only the wall clock was retained from the former CN Outer Station, which is now abandoned and in ruins. The current 1974 mainline station has no notable historic or architectural value.

=== Downtown waterfront ===
Kingston was once served by two railways: the 1856 Grand Trunk Railway (later CN Rail) mainline running east–west, and the now-defunct Kingston and Pembroke Railway, which ran northward to Renfrew, Ontario. The CN mainline between Toronto and Montréal crosses the Rideau Canal system at Kingston Mills, a rural area north of the city, although a spur once existed to serve the formerly-industrial waterfront.

This led to the construction of multiple historic stations in the same city; CN's Outer Station (810 Montreal Street) was located directly on the east–west mainline but awkward to access from downtown. Both a CN (Grand Trunk) spur and a CP-operated railway (the Kingston & Pembroke) followed the west bank of the Cataraqui River to reach Kingston's then-industrial waterfront and lake port. As CP operated K&P's Inner Station directly opposite Kingston City Hall in what is now Confederation Park, the Grand Trunk employed a waterfront agent, Hanlon's Depot (Ontario and Johnson), to remain competitive. The lines extended to the Canadian Locomotive Company factory and Kingston Dry Dock. Land now occupied by Confederation Park, a waterfront Holiday Inn and downtown Ontario Health Insurance Plan offices was once filled by trackage and rail yards, with grain elevators on what is now the Wolfe Islander III dock. Hanlon's Depot closed in the 1930s, K&P was largely dead by the 1950s, and the last waterfront tracks were removed when the locomotive factory closed in the 1960s.

The demise of the industrial waterfront left CN's historic Outer Station as the only passenger station in Kingston.

=== CN / Grand Trunk Outer Station ===
Kingston
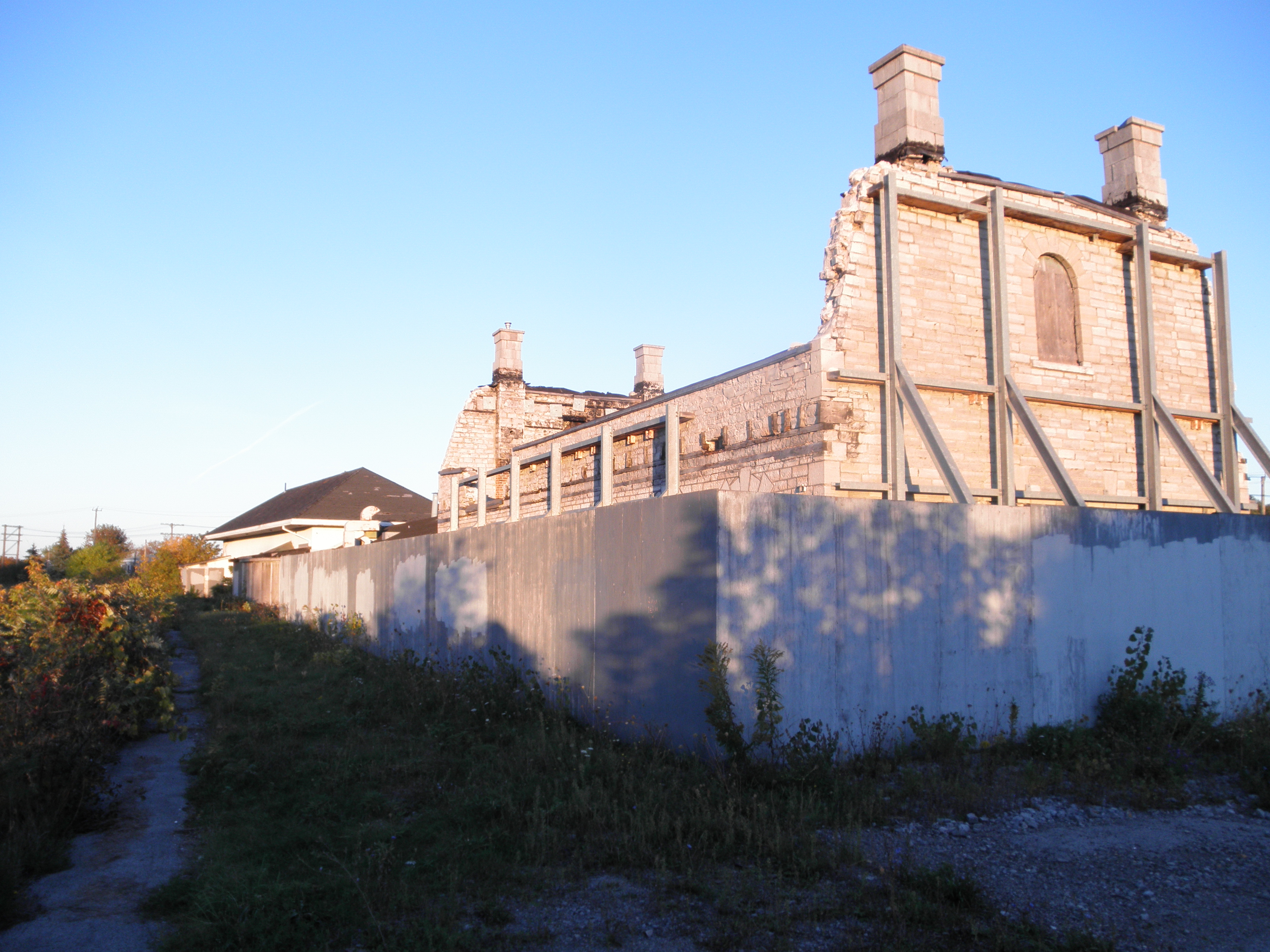

History
- Opened: 1856; 170 years ago
- Closed: 1974; 52 years ago

Former services
Preceding station	Canadian National Railway	Following station
Collin's Bay toward Sarnia	Grand Trunk Railway; Main Line	Rideau toward Montreal
Location

Because of its position at the midpoint of the Toronto-Montréal mainline, Kingston's Outer Station survived as the primary rail station in the area from the line's opening in 1856 until the current station opened in 1974. The station consisted of a stone building (1855) and a brick building (1895–1898) arranged around a curve in the main tracks and joined by a covered platform. The main 1855 limestone station exhibited some similarity in design to Belleville station (220 Station Street, used from 1856 to 2012) as one of a rare few original GTR wayside stations with an added second storey. An 1859 plan shows additional buildings including wood sheds, engine houses, a freight house and a refreshment saloon, which have long been removed.

The tracks were realigned further north in 1976. The railway offices were removed in 1987; the site was briefly refurbished as the Pig and Whistle restaurant (1989 to 1992) and then abandoned. The original roof is gone, damaged by a fire in 1996.

Designated in 1994 as a heritage railway station, the abandoned station after years of neglect lay in ruins, with only portions of the original limestone walls still standing, and held in place by steel supports. One 2004 report to Kingston City Council estimated a $4 million cost to restore the building and clean up toxic contamination of the surrounding grounds. In 2014, Doornekamp Construction proposed relocating the former station to outer Wellington Street, in downtown Kingston, and rebuilding it as office space.

The former station's sub-prime location in the Rideau Heights residential neighbourhood, limits economic prospects for redevelopment of the historic property. Efforts by the City of Kingston to force the Canadian National Railway to preserve or repair the deteriorating station under the Heritage Railway Stations Protection Act and the city's property standards bylaw have only been met with opposition and delay through the courts. The Canadian Heritage Foundation listed the station in 2008 among its top ten endangered sites and considers it to be still at risk. In 2015, the City of Kingston established the North King's Town Secondary Planning project, to examine the revitalization of neighbourhoods which include the Outer Station.

=== K&P Inner Station ===
Kingston
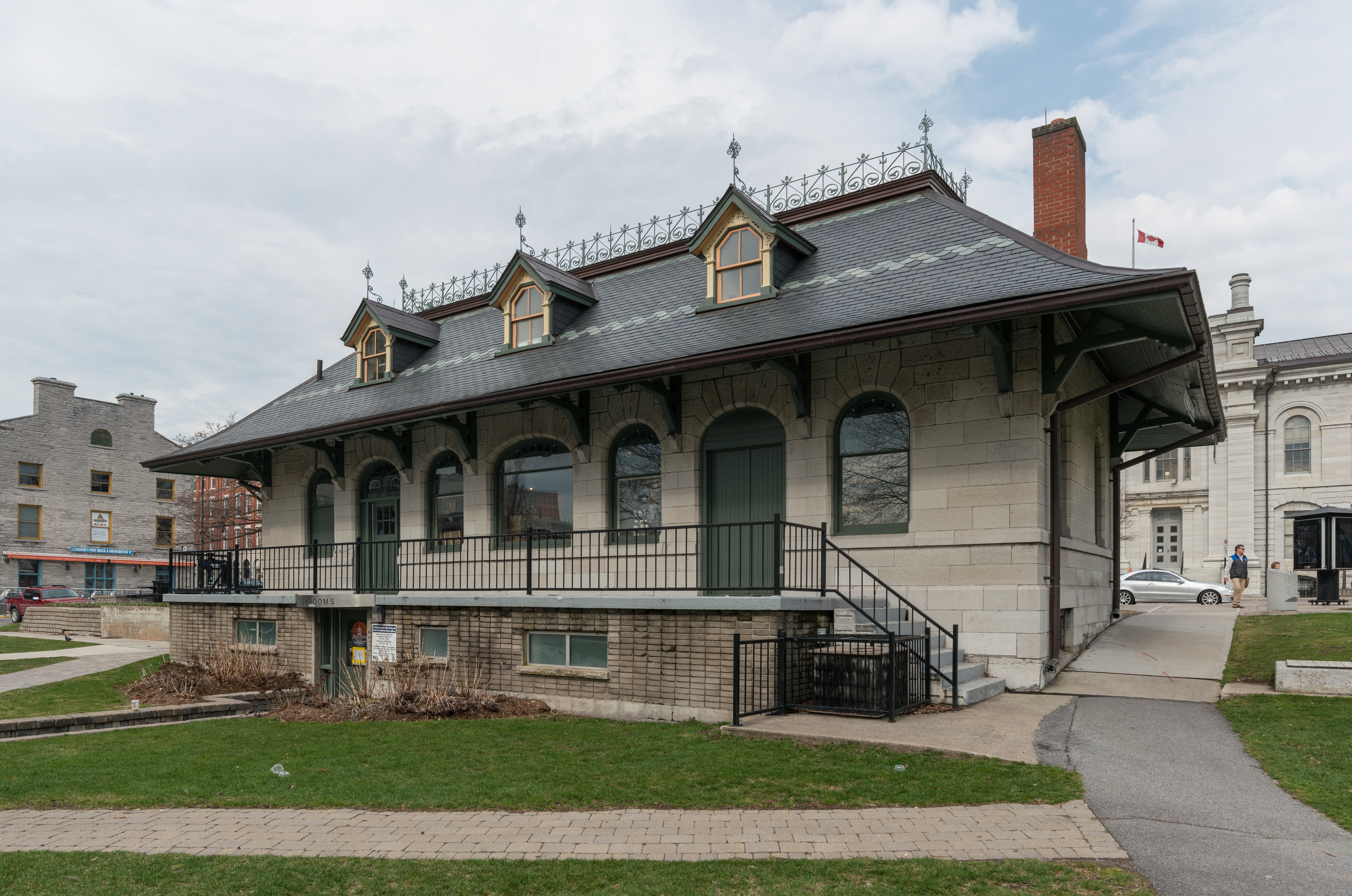
- K&P's Inner Station

Former services
Preceding station	Canadian Pacific Railway	Following station
Cataraqui toward Renfrew	Renfrew – Kingston	Terminus
Location

Kingston's Inner Station, constructed as the southern terminus of the former Kingston and Pembroke Railway, is not part of the CN system. It served passengers on the now-abandoned Kingston-Renfrew line, assumed by the Canadian Pacific Railway in 1913 and largely defunct by the 1950s. The canopy and platform next to the station was demolished after the station closed; as well tracks to the south were removed.

The Bay of Quinte Railway, a local carrier acquired by Canadian Northern Railway, had running rights on K&P tracks from Harrowsmith to Kingston, giving the city access to all three systems. The K&P tracks no longer exist. Due to its prime location at 209 Ontario Street in downtown Kingston (44°13′45″N 76°28′49″W), the historic Inner Station remains open, maintained as a tourist information centre after restoration.

CN passenger service in downtown Kingston existed briefly from Hanlon's Depot (now a restaurant, PJ Murphy's) but never used the K&P station.

== Services ==
VIA Rail Kingston is served by all trains on Via Rail's Toronto-Montreal corridor, and all trains on its Toronto-Ottawa corridor, with one exception (Train 646).

All westbound VIA trains that stop in Kingston are Toronto (Union Station) bound. All eastbound trains that stop here are either Montréal bound or Ottawa bound.

On the Montreal/Toronto corridor it services trains 60, 61, 62, 63, 64, 65, 66, 67, 68, 69, 668, and 669.

On the Ottawa/Toronto corridor it services trains 641, 41, 643, 43, 45, 40, 50, 52, 53, 47, 644, 42, 645, 55, 44, 46, 647, 59, 54, and 48.

== See also ==
- Kingston Bus Terminal
- Kingston Norman Rogers Airport (IATA: YGK, ICAO: CYGK)
