= Kingston Bus Terminal =

Bus station at North portion of Kingston

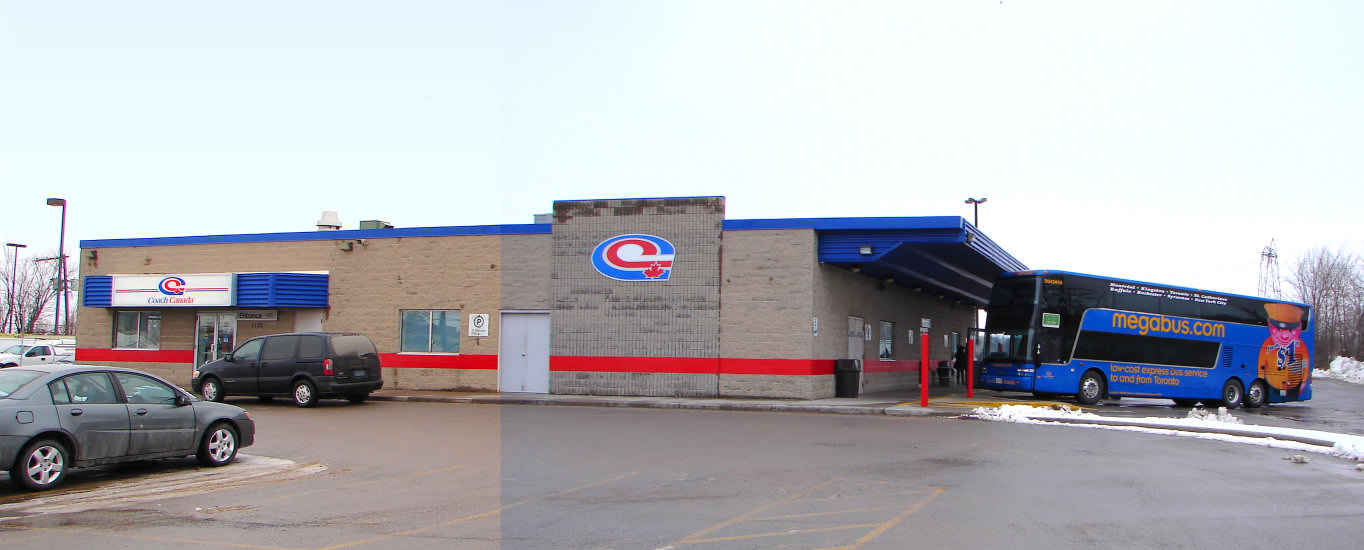

General information
- Location: 1175 John Counter Blvd. Kingston, Ontario; Canada
- Coordinates: 44°15′36″N 76°30′22″W
- Owner: Coach Canada
- Platforms: 4 bays
- Bus operators: Megabus (Coach Canada)
- Connections: Kingston Transit

Construction
- Accessible: yes

History
- Opened: 1992; 34 years ago
Location

Kingston Bus Terminal is the inter-city bus station in Kingston, Ontario, Canada. It is at 1175 John Counter Boulevard, adjoining the Kingston Transit head office and bus garage. This location is in the northern portion of Kingston near Highway 401, the main highway across Southern Ontario. The terminal has 4 bays to handle 4 buses at a time. At present, Megabus/Coach Canada is the only bus line that regularly uses the terminal.

The station is open between 10:30 a.m. and 8:00 p.m. daily. Coq-O-Bec Rotisserie Chicken is located within the terminal, and there is a Tim Hortons next door. Parking for cars is available at the front the building, and for buses to the rear.

Local buses operating in the area of the terminal are Kingston Transit Routes 2, 7, and 16.

The facility opened in 1992, replacing the old bus terminal located on Division Street south of the 401.

== Bus services ==
| Bus Company | Destinations |
|---|---|
| Coach Canada (Megabus) | Brockville, Cornwall, Kirkland, Quebec, Mississauga, Montreal, Ottawa, Toronto, Pearson Airport, Toronto-Yorkdale, Whitby |

=== Previous terminals ===
Colonial Coach Lines initially operated from a garage at Queen and Bagot streets in 1926. In 1931, a new terminal was built behind the Windsor Hotel at Princess and Montreal Streets. In 1947, the terminal moved to a new building off the traffic circle at Bath Road and Princess, which included a restaurant and waiting room. In 1972, what was by then Voyageur Colonial Bus Lines relocated to a terminal at Division Street just south of Counter, close to Highway 401. That building is now the Portuguese Cultural Centre.

== See also ==
- Kingston station - Kingston's train station
- Kingston Norman Rogers Airport (IATA: YGK, ICAO: CYGK)
