= Princess Street (Kingston, Ontario) =

Coordinates: 44.23831°N 76.50493°W

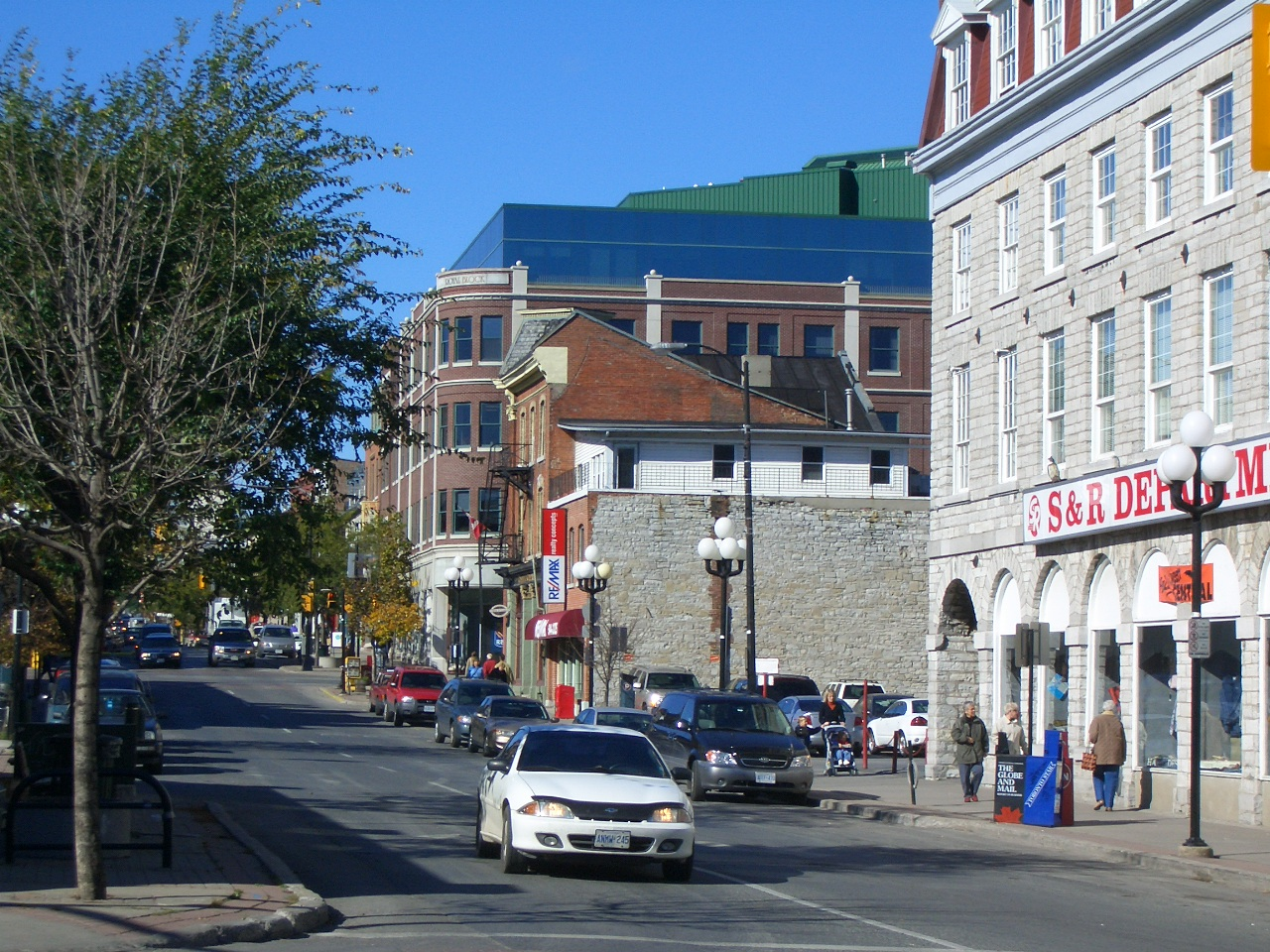
Smith & Robinson building

Princess Street is a major arterial road in Kingston, Ontario, Canada. As the main retail street of downtown Kingston, it is lined by many historic limestone buildings in the city's downtown core.

Princess Street begins at Kingston's current western city limits in Westbrook (continuing from Main Street, Odessa) and ends at the downtown waterfront east of Ontario Street. Eastbound traffic is then carried by Ontario Street across the Lasalle Causeway to Barriefield. All of Princess Street and most of Ontario Street formed part of the Provincial Highway (formerly Highway 2), the main highway from Windsor/Toronto to Montréal until the Kingston Bypass segment of Highway 401 was opened in 1958. In the outlying western sections of the city, the road was still simply Highway 2, with the Princess Street name gradually adopted as the urban area expanded west.

== Overview ==
The street was originally called Store Street due to a large government store at the lower end. It was renamed Princess Street in honour of the birth of the Princess Royal in approximately 1840. The portion west of Highway 33, originally well outside the city limits, appears on maps as York Road at least until 1908 and is historically part of the original 1817 Kingston Road from Toronto (which ends in name today in Ajax). An 1839 toll road, one of the first to be macadamized in the region, retained this same path between Kingston and Napanee; some of this road's stone markers remain visible on the western portion of Princess Street today.

A horse-drawn Street Railway had operated on Princess from Concession Street to the foot of downtown from 1877 to 1905; electric streetcars replaced this on an abbreviated route (Princess from Alfred Street to downtown) until 1930, when the streetcars were destroyed and the system converted to buses.

St. Andrew's Presbyterian Church, founded 1820 and rebuilt in 1889 at Princess and Clergy Street, served as first meeting place of the Board of Trustees of Queen's College (which was granted a Royal Charter in 1841).

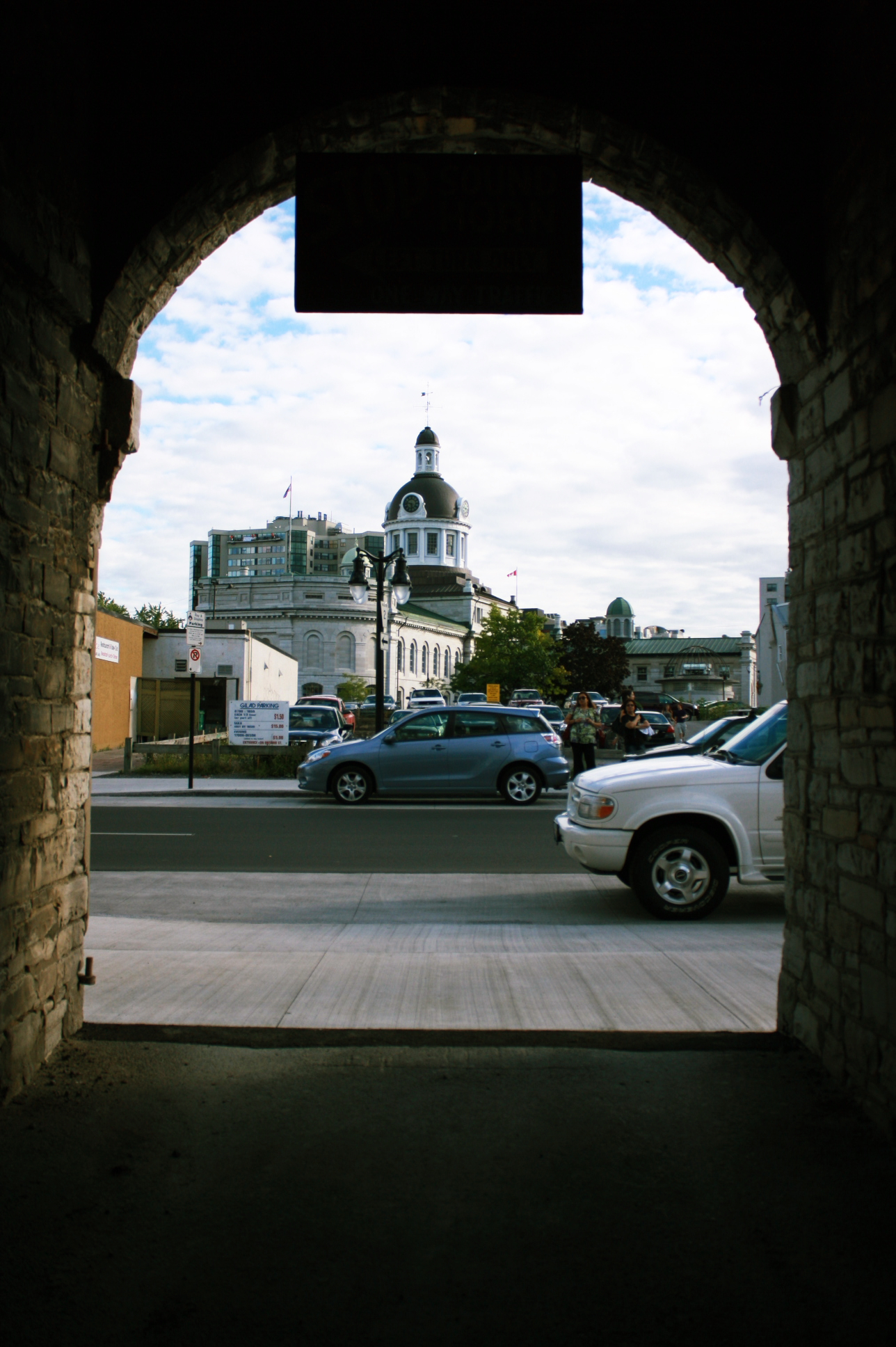
Princess Street, Kingston

The Commercial Mart Building (Princess and Ontario streets), designed and built in 1817 by architect George Browne, housed the John C. Fox piano factory in 1862, was sold to John Stevenson in 1864 and continued piano manufacturing under different names (Weber, Wormwith, Stevenson) and owners until 1939. A four-storey Kingston limestone structure with archways on the ground floor and a prominent location at the foot of downtown, it has served as an army barracks, a public works building and a store. It is best known locally as the location of the S & R Department Store (1959–2009) and is now divided into retail and office space.

The Grand Theatre opened on Princess Street in 1879 as Kingston's Opera House and remains in use today, serving as the home of the Kingston Symphony.

From 1942–74, Princess Street intersected with Bath Road and Concession Street at a traffic circle, which was removed and replaced with traffic signals as volumes increased and the circle's capacity was exceeded. The general area is still sometimes referred to as the "traffic circle" by long-time residents. A shopping centre constructed just west of the traffic circle in 1955 served as Kingston's largest indoor mall until 1982. The Kingston Centre (1100 Princess Street) went into decline in 1999 after losing key anchor tenant Sears to rival Cataraqui Town Centre (Princess at Gardiners Road) and was demolished in 2004 to make way for new retail development anchored by Loblaws.

Much of the western growth of the suburban area around Kingston in the 1960s and 1970s followed the more southerly Bath Road (Highway 33) from the traffic circle westward into the former Kingston Township; major retailers were Sears (Kingston Centre, 1100 Princess at Bath), Woolco (Frontenac Mall, Bath Road) and Kmart (Bath at Gardiners Road). Highway 2 west of the old Kingston city limits and east of Westbrook/Odessa was largely rural until the early 1980s, with the exception of Sentry Plaza (established January 1962, chain defunct early 1980s, site demolished 2012) at what is now the corner of Princess and Centennial Streets. New suburbs in the city, such as Polson Park (1957) and Calvin Park (1962), were planned and built on what was once farmland south of Highway 33. Subsequent expansion tended to follow Highway 33 westward into what was then Kingston Township.

By the 1970s and 1980s, west-end development was being pushed northward (into what is now Bayridge) due to lack of vacant land elsewhere; in 1982, the open rural fields at Princess Street and Gardiners Road (then one block east of old Highway 38, now Midland Avenue) were chosen by Cadillac-Fairview as the location for a major shopping mall, the Cataraqui Centre (945 Gardiners at Princess), which would draw away merchants and commercial activity from the then-existing K-Mart Plaza (defunct, now self-storage) and Frontenac Mall (established 1967, semi-dead mall, kept alive by discount anchors, private practices and public service offices).

By the turn of the millennium, the entire length of Princess from Collins Bay Road to downtown Kingston would be filled by commercial development, with only Westbrook village retaining its original rural character. The construction of a stand-alone Walmart at Princess and Midland Avenue (replacing the former Woolco at Frontenac Mall) has only hastened the exodus of merchants from the old Bath Road onto outer Princess Street.

In the downtown core, Princess Street operates one-way eastbound from Division Street to Ontario Street; westbound traffic is diverted to Queen Street.

West of the former traffic circle, Princess Street is a four-lane divided highway until Bayridge Drive, becoming two lanes where it leaves the urban area at Collins Bay Road. A milestone from an 1836 macadam gravel toll road from Kingston to Napanee still stands at the north east corner of Princess and Collins Bay Road.

== See also ==
- CFLY-FM and CKLC-FM
- CIKR-FM and CKXC-FM
- Kingston Canadian Film Festival
- Royal eponyms in Canada
