= Kingston Transit =

Canadian bus company

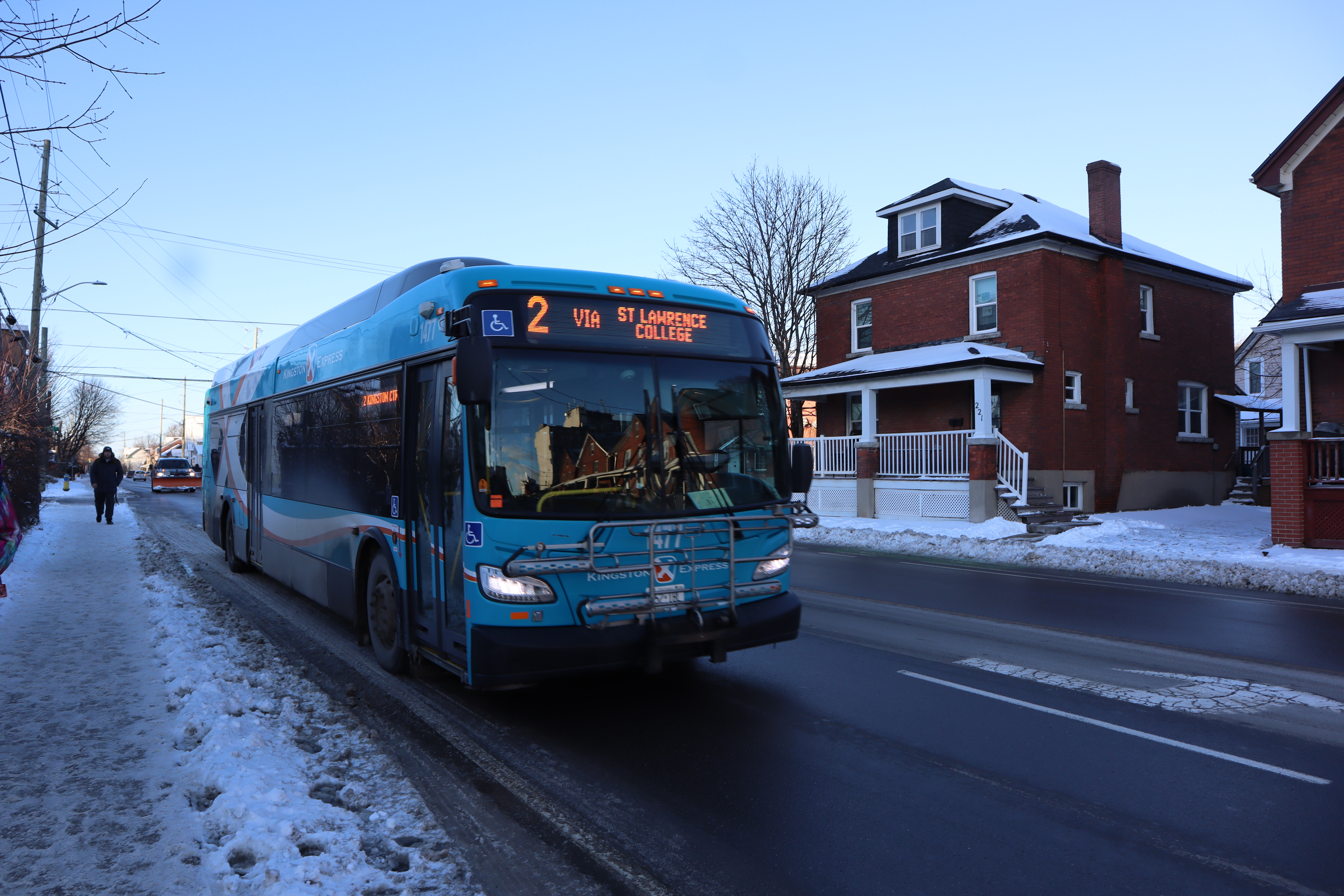
- Founded: 1962; 64 years ago
- Headquarters: 1181 John Counter Blvd
- Service area: Kingston, Ontario; Loyalist, Ontario
- Service type: Bus service
- Routes: 27
- Annual ridership: 6.9 million (2024)
- Operator: City of Kingston
- Website: Official Website

Kingston Transit is the public transit service serving Kingston, Ontario, Canada as well as to the neighbouring community of Amherstview, in Loyalist Township. Major transfer points are at the Kingston Centre, Downtown Kingston (at the corner of Bagot and Brock streets), Cataraqui Town Centre, St. Lawrence College, King’s Crossing, and Gardiners Town Centre. It began on July 1, 1962.

Kingston Transit offers service to all three schools of higher education in the region: Queen's University, St. Lawrence College, and RMC. It also offers service to the Kingston Bus Terminal and the railway station.

== History ==
The Kingston Public Transit System began service on July 1, 1962, when the city's Public Utilities Commission took over the operation of transit service from Kingston City Coach, a subsidiary of Colonial Coach Lines. The Kingston Transit name was adopted in 1975.

In 2017, Kingston Transit experienced a record six million rides, which was the fourth consecutive year that ridership grew by more than 10 percent.

== Routes ==
=== Local ===
Local routes operate Monday–Saturday from approximately 6:00 am to 11:00 pm and Sunday from 8:30 am to 8:30 pm. Generally, peak schedule typically includes Monday–Saturday before 7:00 pm, whereas off peak are all other times. Routes often interline, and depending on location are either consistent (downtown, First Canada/Weller) or random (Cataraqui Centre, St. Lawrence College) as scheduling demands.

Route Number	Direction & destination				Points of Interest	Interlining	Service & frequency	Notes
1	NB	To Montreal Street	SB	To St. Lawrence College	Montreal St. Park & Ride, Downtown, St. Lawrence College	St. Lawrence College: Random	Peak: 30min Off Peak: 60min	1B ends Downtown
2	EB	To Division Street	WB	To Train Station	Guthrie / Joyce, Bus Terminal, Downtown, St. Lawrence College, Train Station	—N/a	Peak: 30min Off Peak: 60min	Merged with 18
2B	NB	To Bus Terminal	SB	To Downtown	Bus Terminal, Downtown	—N/a	Peak: 30min Off Peak: 60min	Short turn variant used at end of day.
4	NB	To Cataraqui Centre	SB	To Downtown	Cataraqui Centre, Kingston Gospel Temple Park & Ride, Kingston Centre, Downtown	Downtown: 501 4 (Off-peak) Cataraqui Centre: Random	Peak: 30min Off Peak: 30min	
6	NB	To Cataraqui Centre	SB	To St. Lawrence College	Cataraqui Centre, Gardiners Centre, Centre 70 Park & Ride, St. Lawrence College	Cataraqui Centre: Random St. Lawrence College: Random	Peak: 30min Off Peak: 60min	Off Peak service includes weekday evenings
6B	NB	To Cataraqui Centre	SB	To Gardiners Centre	Cataraqui Centre, Gardiners Centre	Cataraqui Centre: Random	Off Peak: 60min	Weekend Off Peak Service Only
7	EB	To Grant Timmins / Dalton	WB	To Cataraqui Centre	Cataraqui Centre, Kingston Gospel Temple Park & Ride, John Counter / Old Mill, Bus Terminal, Grant Timmins / Dalton	Cataraqui Centre: Random	Peak: 30min Off Peak: 30min (Cataraqui - Bus Terminal) 60min (Bus Terminal - Grant Timmins/Dalton)	
7B	EB	To Bus Terminal	WB	To Cataraqui Centre	Cataraqui Centre, Kingston Gospel Temple Park & Ride, John Counter / Old Mill, Bus Terminal	Cataraqui Centre: Random	Peak: 30min Off Peak: 30min (Cataraqui - Bus Terminal) 60min (Bus Terminal - Grant Timmins/Dalton)	Off-peak only. Short turn variant.
10	EB	To Cataraqui Centre	WB	To Amherstview	Cataraqui Centre, Taylor-Kidd / Bayridge, Loyalist / Fairfield, WJ Henderson Rec Centre	Cataraqui Centre: Random	Peak: 30min Off Peak: 30min	Funded by Loyalist Township
11	EB	To Train Station	WB	To Cataraqui Centre	Train Station, Kingston Centre, Gardiners Centre, Cataraqui Centre	Cataraqui Centre: Random	Peak: 60min Off Peak: 60min	
11B	NB	To Train Station	SB	To Kingston Centre	Train Station, Kingston Centre	—N/a	Peak: 60min Off Peak: 60min	Short turn variant used at end of day.
12	EB	To CFB Kingston	WB	To St. Lawrence College (School Year) To Downtown (Summer)	St. Lawrence College, Downtown, Cambrai / Princess Mary	St. Lawrence College: Random	Peak: 30min	Weekday Peak Service Only.
12B	EB	To Downtown	WB	To St. Lawrence College	St. Lawrence College, Downtown, Cambrai / Princess Mary	Downtown: 601	Peak: 30min	Weekday Peak Service Only. Only during school year.
13	Counter-clockwise		Loop connecting Cataraqui North to Cataraqui Centre		Cataraqui Centre, INVISTA Centre Park & Ride, Princess / Augusta, Cataraqui Centre	Cataraqui Centre: Random	Peak: 30min Off Peak: 30min	Complements clockwise 14
14	Clockwise		Loop connecting Cataraqui North to Cataraqui Centre		Cataraqui Centre, INVISTA Centre Park & Ride, Princess / Augusta, Cataraqui Centre	Cataraqui Centre: Random	Peak: 30min Off Peak: 30min	Complements counter-clockwise 13 14B ends at INVISTA Centre
15	NB	To Cataraqui Centre	SB	To Centre 70 Park & Ride	Cataraqui Centre, Tivoli / Sierra, Holy Cross Secondary, 1385 Waverley Cr., Gardiners Centre, Glen Castle / Henderson, Centre 70 Park & Ride	Cataraqui Centre: Random	Peak: 30min Off Peak: 60min	
15B	NB	To Cataraqui Centre	SB	To Gardiners Centre	Cataraqui Centre, Tivoli / Sierra, Holy Cross Secondary, 1385 Waverley Cr., Gardiners Centre	Cataraqui Centre: Random	Off Peak: 60min	Off Peak Service Only
16	NB	To First Canada / Weller	SB	To St. Lawrence College	First Canada / Weller, Kingston Centre, St Lawrence College	First Canada/Weller: 22 St. Lawrence College: Random	Peak: 30min Off Peak: 60min	
19	EB	To Cataraqui Centre	WB	To Cataraqui Woods / Holden (Woodhaven)	Cataraqui Centre, Cataraqui Woods / Holden	Cataraqui Centre: Random	Peak: 30min Off Peak: 60min	
19A	EB	To Cataraqui Centre	WB	To Westbrook / Roshan	Cataraqui Centre, Cataraqui Woods / Holden, Westbrook / Roshan	Cataraqui Centre: Random	Peak: 30min	Only runs during peak hours & weekdays
22	EB	To Innovation / Highway 15	WB	To First Canada / Weller	First Canada / Weller, Rideau Heights Community Centre, Rideau Town Centre, Innovation / Highway 5	First Canada/Weller: 16	Peak: 30min Off Peak: 60min	22A travels via Weller Ave.
31	Start	St Lawrence College	End	Providence Care Hospital	St. Lawrence College, Kingston Centre, Princess / Ontario, Providence Care Hospital	Providence Care Hospital: 32	Peak: 30min Off Peak: 30min (St. Lawrence - Kingston Centre) 60min (Kingston Centre - Providence Care Hospital)	Single direction route replacing 3 . Complemented by 32
31B	Start	St Lawrence College	End	Kingston Centre	St. Lawrence College, Kingston Centre	Providence Care Hospital: 32	Peak: 30min Off Peak: 30min (St. Lawrence - Kingston Centre) 60min (Kingston Centre - Providence Care Hospital)	Single direction route. Off-peak only. Short turn variant.
32	Start	Providence Care Hospital	End	St Lawrence College	St. Lawrence College, Kingston Centre, Princess / Ontario, Providence Care Hospital	St. Lawrence College: Random	Peak: 30min Off Peak: 30min (Kingston Centre - St. Lawrence) 60min (Providence Care Hospital - Kingston Centre)	Single direction route replacing 3 . Complemented by 31
32B	Start	Kingston Centre	End	St Lawrence College	St. Lawrence College, Kingston Centre, Princess / Ontario, Providence Care Hospital	—N/a	Peak: 30min Off Peak: 30min (Kingston Centre - St. Lawrence) 60min (Providence Care Hospital - Kingston Centre)	Single direction route. Short turn variant used at end of day.
60	NB	To King’s Crossing North	SB	To Royal Military College	King’s Crossing North, D’Artisan / Highway 2 (CFB Kingston), Downtown (if Causeway is open	—N/a	—N/a	Used during Causeway closures. 60B starts at Fort Henry during Caseway closures, no service from downtown.

=== Overnight ===
A single overnight route provides service between the end of service to 3 AM and from 4 AM to start of service.

Route Number	Direction & destination				Points of Interest	Interlining	Service & frequency	Notes
N1	EB	To Bus Terminal	WB	To Midland Avenue (See notes)	Cataraqui Centre, Kingston Gospel Temple Park & Ride, Kingston Centre, St. Lawrence College, Queen’s University, Downtown, Bus Terminal	—N/a	Irregular Frequency	Early morning runs terminate at Cataraqui Centre instead of Midland Avenue

=== Express ===
Express routes operate with a frequency of 10–30 minutes and have stops placed further apart than local routes.

Route Number	Direction & destination				Points of Interest	Interlining	Service & frequency	Notes
501	Clockwise		Loop connecting Cataraqui Centre to Downtown		Cataraqui Centre, Kingston Gospel Temple Park & Ride, Kingston Centre, Downtown, Queen’s University/Kingston General Hospital, St. Lawrence College, Centre 70 Park & Ride	Downtown: Continues Loop Cataraqui Centre: Most likely to continue loop. Occasionally breaks loop to interline with other routes.	10 minutes during rush hour 15, 20, or 30 minutes at other times	Often runs local as 4 on Princess St.
502	Counter-Clockwise		Loop connecting Cataraqui Centre to Downtown		Cataraqui Centre, Kingston Gospel Temple Park & Ride, Kingston Centre, Downtown, Queen’s University/Kingston General Hospital, St. Lawrence College, Centre 70 Park & Ride	Downtown: Continues Loop Cataraqui Centre: Most likely to continue loop. Occasionally breaks loop to interline with other routes.	10 minutes during rush hour 15, 20, or 30 minutes at other times	Often runs local as 4 on Princess St.
601	Start	Queen's / Kingston General Hospital	End	Innovation / Highway 15	Queen’s University/Kingston General Hospital, Downtown, Cambrai / Princess Mary, Innovation/ Highway 15	Innovation/ Highway 15: 602	15 minutes Monday–Friday, before 7pm 30 minutes all other times	No service on Summer Sundays. 601A & 602A travels on Main St instead of Highway 15
602	Start	Innovation / Highway 15	End	Queen's / Kingston General Hospital	Queen’s University/Kingston General Hospital, Downtown, Cambrai / Princess Mary, Innovation/ Highway 15	Queen’s/KGH: 601	15 minutes Monday–Friday, before 7pm 30 minutes all other times	No service on Summer Sundays. 601A & 602A travels on Main St instead of Highway 15
602B	Start	Innovation / Highway 15	End	Downtown	Queen’s University/Kingston General Hospital, Downtown, Cambrai / Princess Mary, Innovation/ Highway 15	Downtown: 12	15 minutes Monday–Friday, before 7pm 30 minutes all other times	No service on Summer Sundays. 601A & 602A travels on Main St instead of Highway 15
701	Start	King's Crossing North	End	Cataraqui Centre	King’s Crossing North, Downtown, Kingston Centre, Frontenac Centre, Gardiner Centre, Cataraqui Centre	Cataraqui Centre: Random	15 minutes during rush hour 30 minute at other times	
702	Start	Cataraqui Centre	End	King's Crossing North	King’s Crossing North, Downtown, Kingston Centre, Frontenac Centre, Gardiner Centre, Cataraqui Centre	King’s Crossing: 701	15 minutes during rush hour 30 minute at other times	
702B	Start	Cataraqui Centre	End	Downtown	Downtown, Kingston Centre, Frontenac Centre, Gardiner Centre, Cataraqui Centre	Downtown: 802	15 minutes during rush hour 30 minute at other times	
801	Start	Downtown	End	Montreal St. Park & Ride	Montreal St. Park & Ride, Downtown	Montreal Street: 801	15 minutes during rush hour 30 minute at other times	
802	Start	Montreal St. Park & Ride	End	Downtown	Montreal St. Park & Ride, Downtown	Downtown: 701	15 minutes during rush hour 30 minute at other times	

== Fares ==
Category	Cash	Multi-ride Pass (6 tickets)	Monthly Pass
Child (Ages 0–14)	Free	N/A	N/A
Youth (Ages 15–24)	$3.50	$14.00	$61.75
Adult (Ages 25–64)	$3.50	$17.15	$83.00
Senior (Ages 65+)	$3.50	$14.00	$61.75

Kingston Transit fares and My Card rates effective January 1, 2017. Daily and Weekly passes are also available from various transit locations.

Kingston Transit employs a smart card payment system for monthly passes (My Pass) and tickets (My Tickets), which was introduced in August 2008.

Transfers are free for cash fares but must be obtained at the time fare is paid. They are valid for 90 minutes. Payments using My Tickets have transfers automatically stored inside the card.

Queen's University students, who are members of the AMS or SGPS, as well as St. Lawrence College students can ride free, as part of a U-Pass program.

Kingston Transit did not increased fares till 2025 to encourage more individuals to ride transit in the years following the COVID-19 pandemic.

== Rack and Roll ==
The current "Rack and Roll" system is used for bicycle transportation. If a customer wishes to bring a bicycle onto the bus, a pull-down rack is located at the outside front of the bus. The rack can currently hold 2 bicycles. It involves 2 slots which the bicycle's wheels fit into. Then, a curved hook fits around the front tire to secure the bike from falling. Rack and Roll is available during the cycling season.
