= Ottawa Central Station =

Closed inter-city bus station in Ottawa, Ontario, Canada

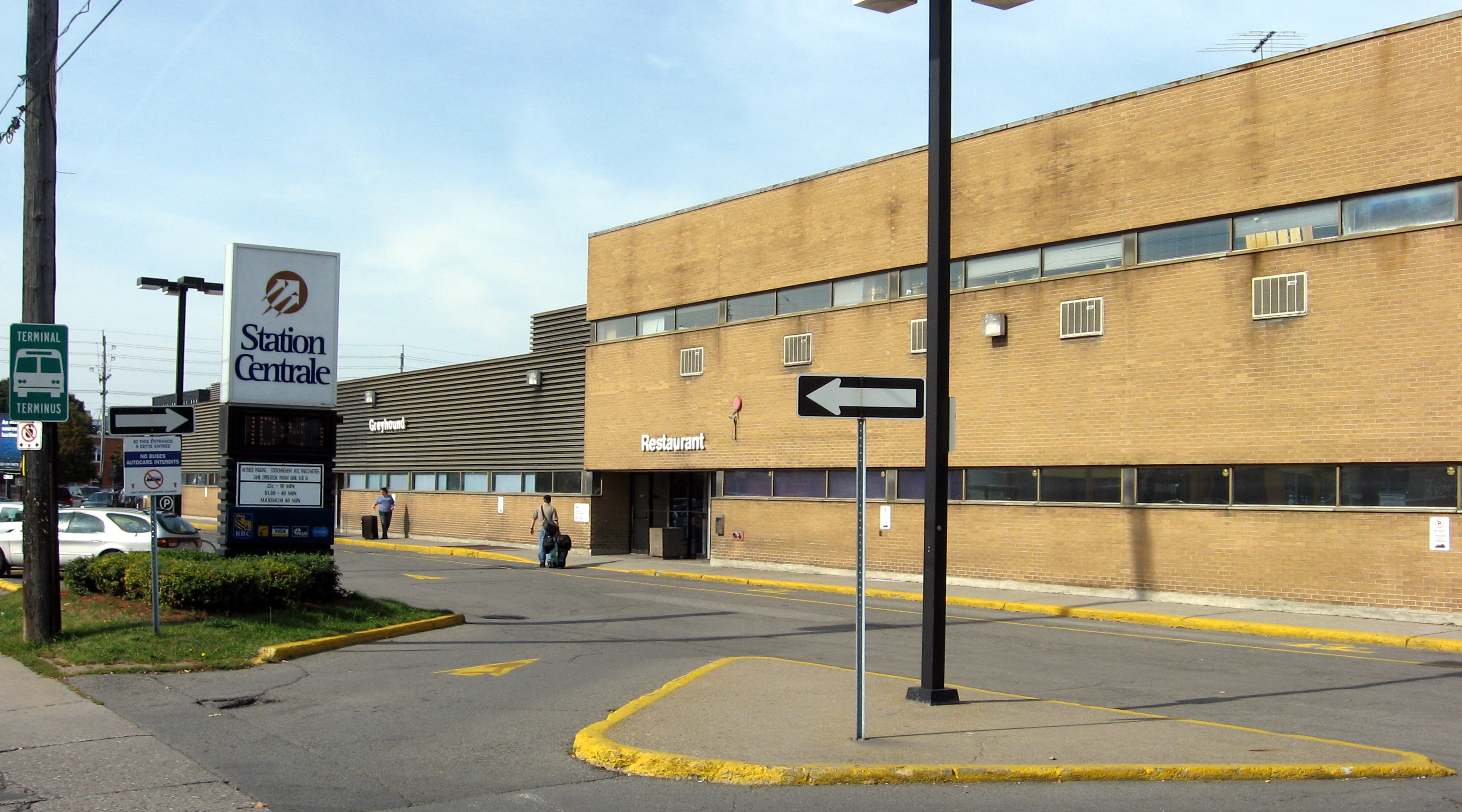
- Bus station while it was operated by Station Centrale

General information
- Location: 265 Catherine Street; Ottawa, Ontario; K1R 7S5
- Coordinates: 45°24′31″N 75°41′41″W
- Owner: Brigil Real Estate Society
- Bus stands: 14 (4 for arrivals)
- Connections

Construction
- Structure type: At-grade
- Parking: Paid parking - short and long term
- Cycle facilities: Yes
- Accessible: Yes

Other information
- Website: Last snapshot of official website in August 2020

History
- Opened: 1972; 54 years ago
- Closed: June 1, 2021
Location
- Location within Ottawa Location within Ontario Location within Canada

Ottawa Central Station was the main inter-city bus station in Ottawa, Ontario, Canada. It was located 1.5 km south of downtown Ottawa in the Centretown neighbourhood and served buses from Greyhound Canada, Ontario Northland and Autobus Gatineau. It closed on June 1, 2021, and the land it sat on is now owned by Brigil, a real estate developer, who plans to build a multi-use space for housing, dining, retail, and other businesses.

Ottawa Central Station was located at 265 Catherine Street, between Lyon Street and Kent Street. Catherine Street lies directly north of Ontario Highway 417 (known locally as the Queensway), which is the main expressway through Ottawa. The former station was accessible from highway 417 exits 120 (eastbound) and 119 (westbound).

The station's main entrance faced south towards Catherine Street and the 417. On the north side of the station building, buses called at 14 outdoor bus stands with adjoining indoor gates. The front of the buses were partially covered by a roof overhang.

The property it sat on is located one block west of Bank Street, a major north-south commercial street in Ottawa. Continuing north on Bank Street leads to downtown and the main government and business district, while south of highway 417, the street passes through the more residential neighbourhood of the Glebe on its way to Landsdowne Park and the Rideau Canal.

Nearby landmarks include the Canadian Museum of Nature on Metcalfe Street and beyond that, the southern end of Elgin Street, a north-south commercial street with many small shops, restaurants and bars.

Ottawa Central Station was located roughly 5 kilometres (3.1 mi) west of the Ottawa Train Station and 11 kilometres (6.8 mi) north of Ottawa Macdonald–Cartier International Airport.

== Main destinations ==
Historically, the majority of buses serving the station were operated by Voyageur Colonial Bus Lines (later Greyhound Canada.) Destinations from Ottawa included Toronto (with connections to the United States), Montreal (with connections to the United States and Quebec City), Syracuse (with connections to New York City and Philadelphia), and Sudbury. Greyhound Canada suspended all its routes in May 2020; on October 1, it announced it would not be using the station when it resumed activities. Ultimately, the company ceased operations entirely on May 13, 2021.

On January 21, 2016, Ontario Northland Motor Coach Services began operating between Ottawa Central Station and Sudbury to better serve passengers connecting to and from Northern Ontario communities. Destinations included Sudbury, North Bay, Pembroke, Petawawa, Sault Ste. Marie, and White River. Following the station's closure, this service now operates from Ottawa Train Station.

On February 29, 2016, Autobus Gatineau, a subsidiary of Autobus Maheux, began operating from Ottawa Central Station to Gatineau, Kazabazua, Maniwaki, and Grand-Remous after Greyhound reduced service to Fridays and Sundays only. Greyhound later discontinued offering this service altogether. Autobus Gatineau's service continued to use a street stop at 265 Catherine Street until 2022.

== Services ==
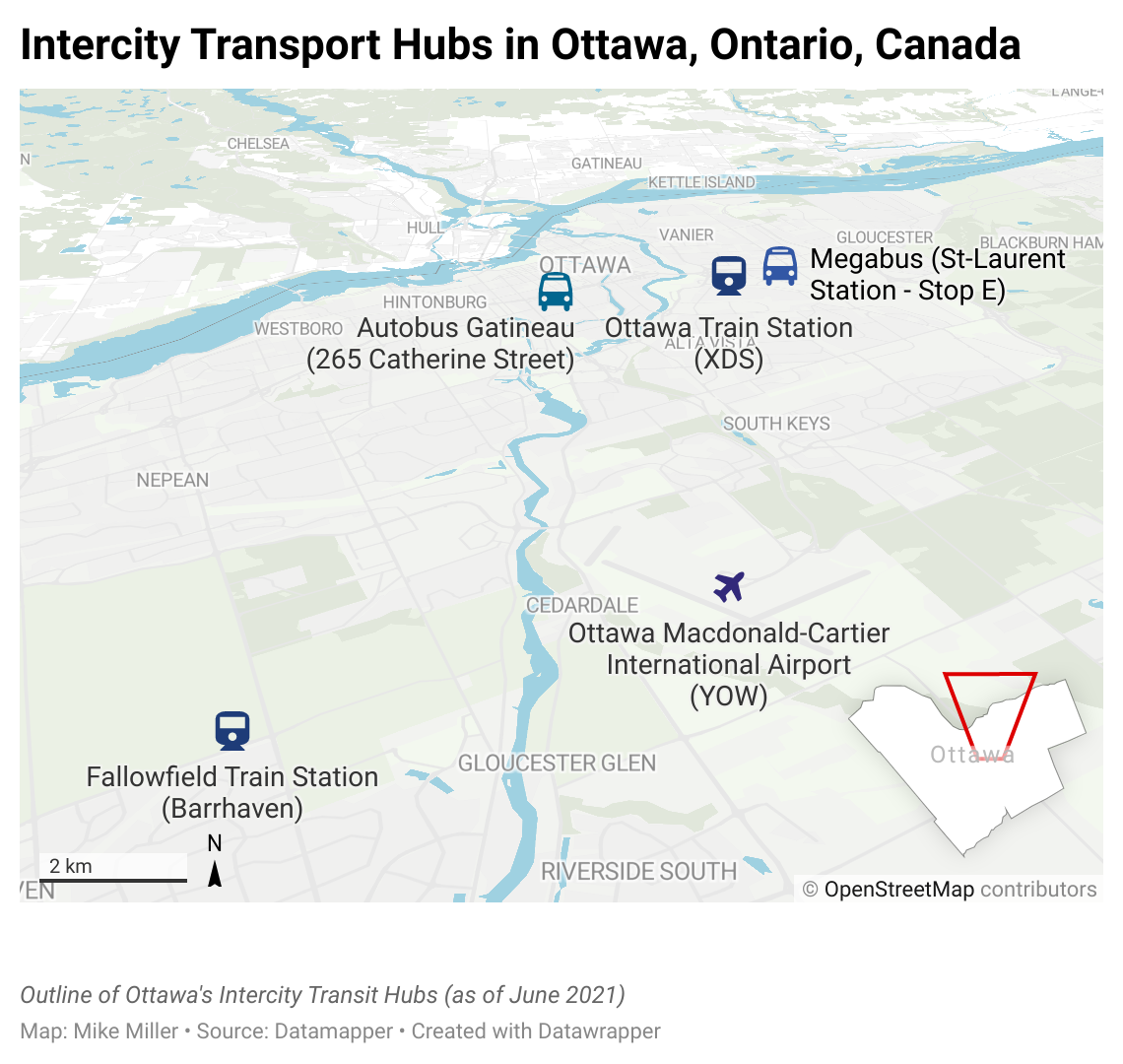
Intercity transport hubs in Ottawa, Ontario

Station services included free Wi-Fi and a travel lounge with seating, tables, power outlets. The lounge was open at all times to travelers in the station. The station also offered a number of vending machines with hot and cold beverages, food, candy, as well as earbuds. In addition, the station offered a baggage storage service for passengers. There was also an ATM and a Mr. Sub restaurant in the terminal.

== Local bus connections (OC Transpo) ==
#	Terminus	Terminus	Notes
85	Bayshore	Lees	Operates between Lees and Bayshore 7 days a week.

For more local bus route information, see OC Transpo routes

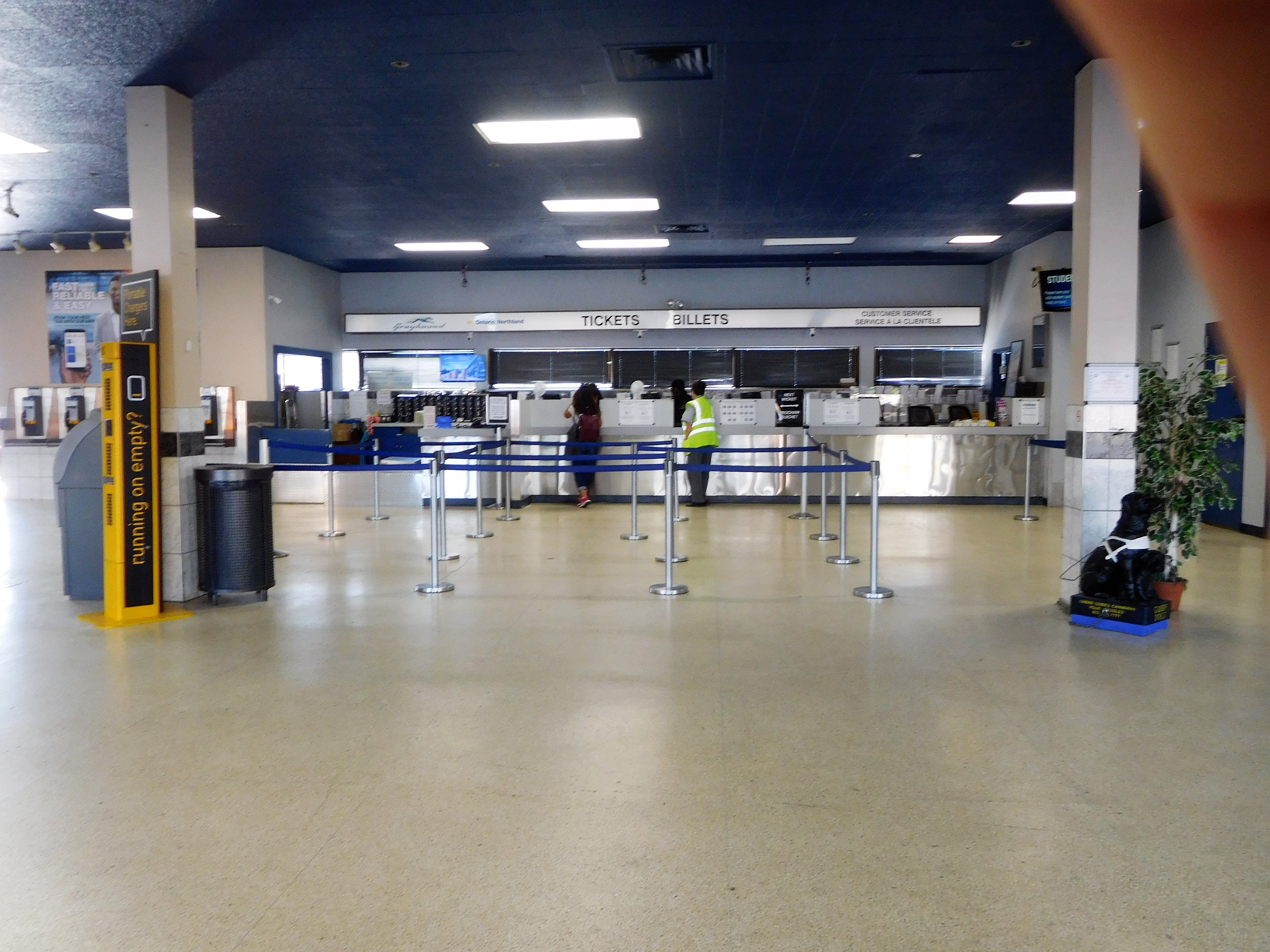
Ticket Counter at Ottawa Central Station

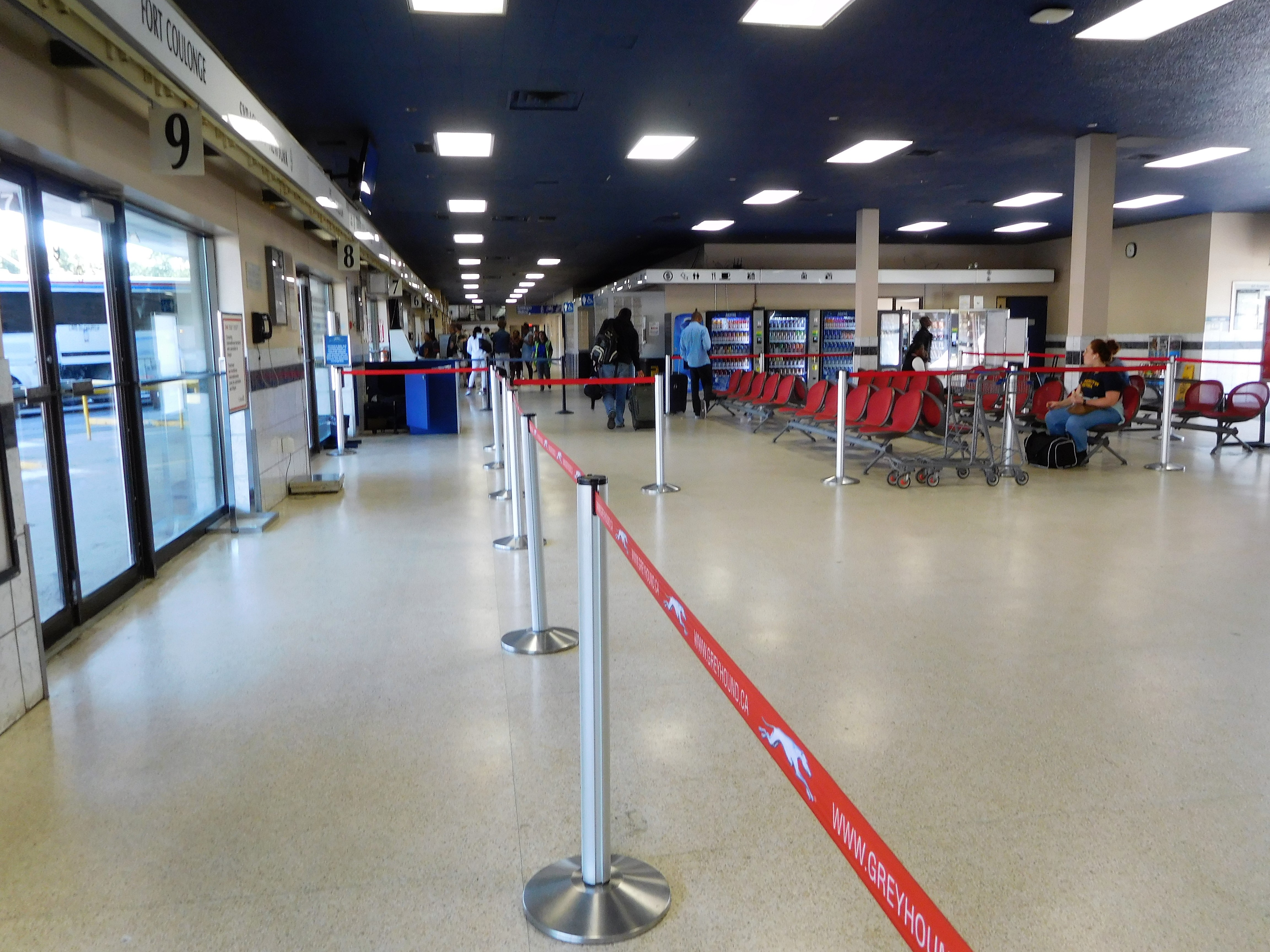
Bus Stand at Ottawa Central Station

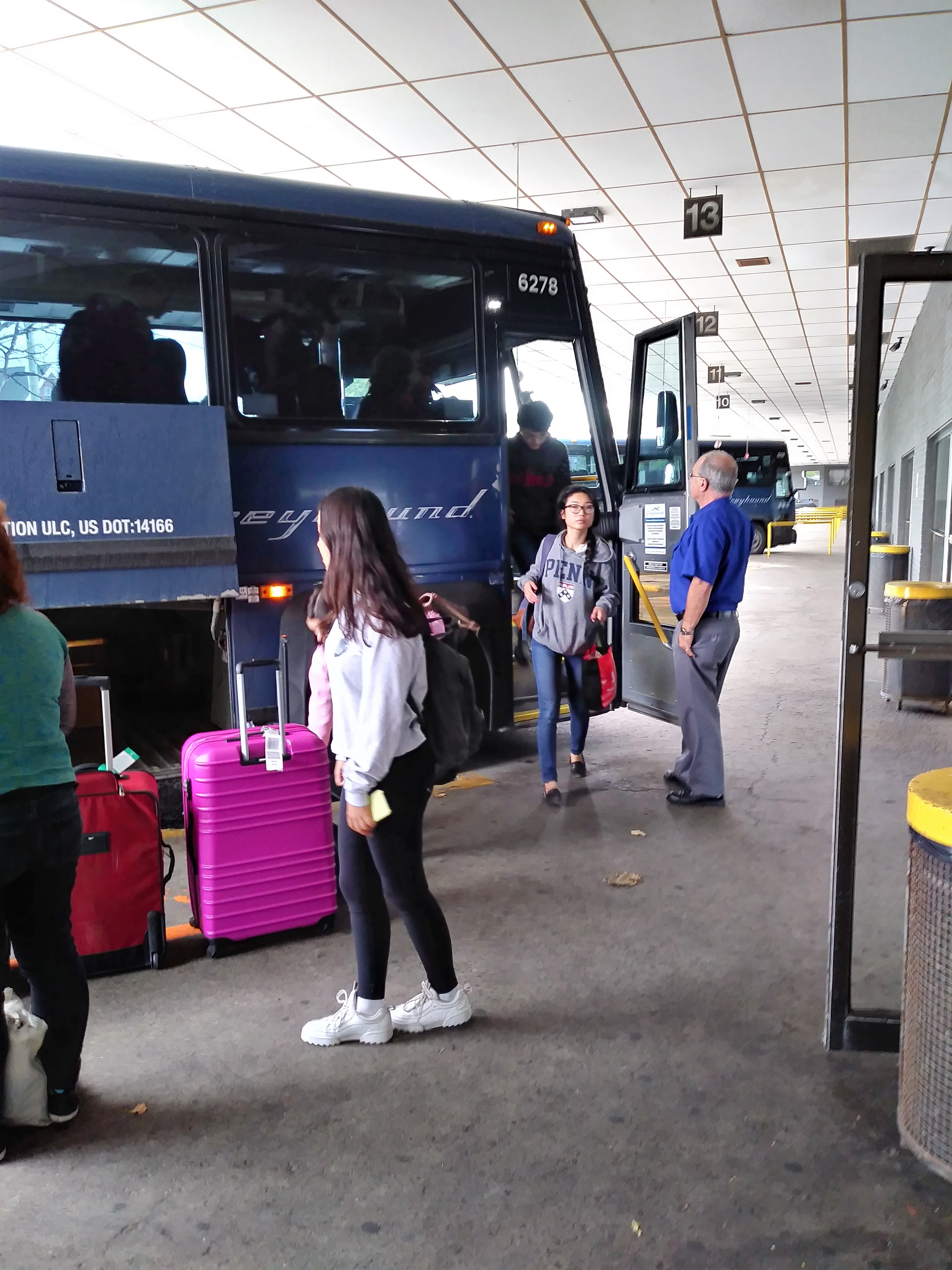
Passengers disembarking from a Greyhound Bus. Outdoor Bus Stand Area, Ottawa Central Station

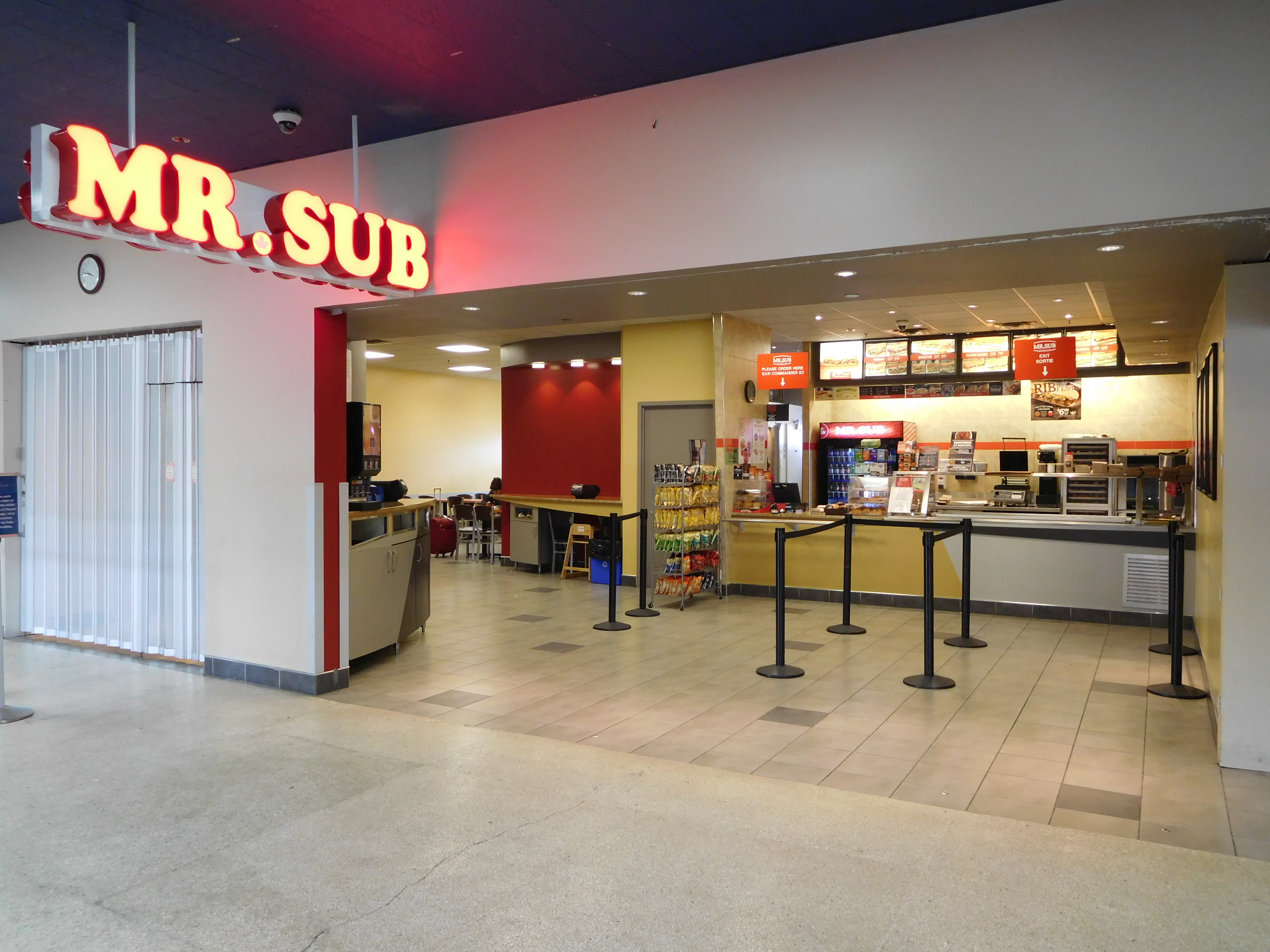
Mr. Sub at Ottawa Central Station, 2016

== History ==
Ottawa Central Station once had the same management as Montreal's major bus terminal, Gare d'autocars de Montréal before the latter was purchased by the Quebec government. On February 7, 2011, the terminal operations were sold to Corporate Customer Service Limited, a sub-contractor of Greyhound Canada. Corporate Customer Service formed a new company, Ottawa Central Station Inc., to manage the terminal. On September 1, 2011, Corporate Customer Service Ltd. handed over the head lease to Greyhound, who in turn negotiated and signed a long-term lease with the property's owner. Ottawa Central Station Inc. remains as an agency within a Greyhound terminal. The building and the lot is owned by Crerar Silverside Corporation.

=== Proposed relocation ===
In early 2010, Ottawa Mayor Larry O'Brien announced that he was working with Greyhound to move to bus terminal to a new location next to the Via Rail station on Tremblay Road, effectively creating a transport hub along with the proposed LRT. According to O'Brien, talks had been going on for a while and Greyhound seemed warm to the idea, however the Catherine station's owner, Stewart Robertson, was never consulted and only learned through the media about the proposed move. The move sparked controversy and mixed opinions with the public and local politicians, stating that the proposed location is inconvenient as it is not central, or more convenient as it is along the Transitway.

Robertson, the station's owner, released renderings of a proposed renovation that would see the inside and outside of the terminal's aesthetics improved as well as the terminal's heating and ventilation system, however these improvements would only come if Greyhound were to sign a long-term agreement with Robertson, which in the end would result in Station Centrale being phased out as the terminal's operators.

On March 11, 2011, it was revealed that Stewart Robertson had applied for rezoning of the lot to general mixed-use as a contingency plan if Greyhound were to leave.

In September 2011, Greyhound signed a long-term lease with Crerar Silverside Corporation. As a result, the terminal was not to be relocated and extensive renovations were to be done to the station in 2011 and 2012, possibly totalling over one million dollars.

=== Future ===
Brigil, a real estate developer, purchased the station from Crerar Silverside in 2021. It plans to demolish the station and redevelop the site, with construction beginning in 2023.

== See also ==
- Gare d'autocars de Montréal
- Greyhound Canada
- Ottawa Macdonald–Cartier International Airport (IATA: YOW, ICAO: CYOW) - Ottawa's international airport
- Ottawa station - Ottawa's main train station
- Voyageur Colonial Bus Lines
