= Cataraqui Centre =

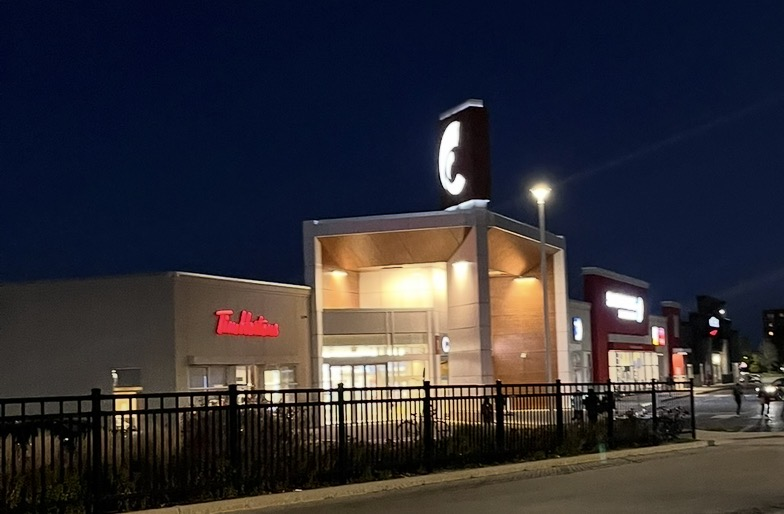
- An entrance to the mall
- Location: Kingston, Ontario, Canada
- Coordinates: 44.256°N 76.570°W
- Address: 945 Gardiners Road
- Opened: 1982
- Manager: Primaris
- Num. of stores: 141
- Num. of anchor tenants: 6 (4 open, 2 vacant)
- Floor area: 607,000 sq ft (56,400 m^{2})
- Floors: 2
- Public transit: Kingston Transit Cataraqui Centre Terminal; 4 6 7 10 11 13 14 15 19 501 502 701 702 N1
- Website: cataraquicentre.ca

Cataraqui Centre, (formerly "Cataraqui Town Centre") is a shopping mall located in Kingston, Ontario, Canada. It is the largest mall in southeastern Ontario with over 141 stores spanning 607,000 square feet (56,392 m^{2}) of retail space.

Built in 1982, Cataraqui Centre is today Kingston’s dominant shopping mall. It also includes a major transfer point for Kingston Transit serving 14 bus routes. Additionally, the Isabel Turner library branch is located at the edge of the parking lot.

== Description ==
The mall is located in the northwest of the city, near the intersection of Princess Street and Gardiners Road. It is built on a slope, allowing both floors to have an at-grade entrance - lower level from south side and upper level from north side. By the south entrance, Kingston Transit has a major terminal, servicing 14 bus routes.

The mall is home to dozens of shops. Shops range from clothing shops, to hair salons, to electronic shops, and more. The south entrance leads to the food court on the lower level of the mall. The mall is home to 141 stores, including 6 anchors.

=== Anchors and majors ===
- H&M (multi-level, 19,834 sq ft.)
- Sport Chek (lower level, 19,126 sq ft.)
- Shoppers Drug Mart (lower level, 9,800 sq ft)
- Indigo Books (upper level, 15,307 sq ft.)

=== Food Court ===
The food court is located in the centre of the lower level of the mall. They include:

- A&W
- Manchu Wok
- Subway
- Jimmy the Greek
- Gino’s Pizza
- New York Fries
- KFC
- Amaya’s
- Real Fruit Bubble Tea
- Bento Sushi

Additionally, Tim Hortons has a location outside of the food court by the south entrance - opposite of the Shopper’s Drug Mart location. Freshly Squeezed and Purdy’s Chocolatier have a location situated slightly outside the food court by the elevator.

== History ==
Cataraqui Town Centre opened in September, 1982 as a two level mall with Simpsons and Zellers department stores and a Loblaws supermarket. Simpsons was rebranded as The Bay (another brand within the same chain, the Hudson's Bay Company) in 1986. In September 1999, Sears relocated from the Kingston Centre to a new store at Cataraqui which anchored a new addition. Along with the new addition came a revamping of the mall's interior, and the relocation of the escalators and food court. Loblaws moved down Midland Avenue in 2001, and their former space was converted to a new expanded food court, Shoppers Drug Mart, and a Sport Chek store. Zellers was replaced with Target in 2013; the latter closed in 2015.

== Transportation access ==
Cataraqui Centre is accessible by private automobile and local transit. Major roads in the area serving the mall include Princess Street, Gardiners Road, and Midland Avenue. Gardiners Road provides easy access to Highway 401. The mall is surrounded by large surface parking lots with a ring road surrounding the mall.

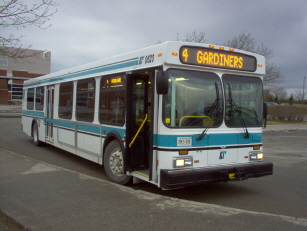
The Isabel Turner library branch seen in the background adjacent the parking lot and the bus transfer point

Kingston Transit has a bus terminal outside the south entrance on the lower level, providing connections to 14 bus routes serving both Kingston and Loyalist. These consists of local routes, express routes, and early morning runs of the overnight N1 service, connecting to the first daytime runs. Daytime routes serving this terminal include: 4, 6/6B, 7/7B, 10, 11, 13/14, 15/15B, 19/19A, 501/502, and 701/701B/702/702B.

The bus terminal was modernised in both 2016 and again in 2026.
