= Kingston Centre =

Shopping mall in Canada

Coordinates: 44.242°N 76.516°W

The Kingston Centre is a 223,327 sq ft (20,747.8 m^{2}). campus-style open-air shopping centre located in the centre of Kingston, Ontario. It began as an indoor mall originally built in 1955 and demolished in 2004 called Kingston Shopping Centre and was renamed at one point to the current name before being redeveloped in its current iteration.

Anchored by the Loblaws supermarket and a Canadian Tire store and bordered by Sir John A. Macdonald Blvd, Bath Road and Princess Street.

== History ==
The Kingston Shopping Centre was built in 1955 and anchored by Simpsons-Sears (later Sears Canada) department store. It was located at 1100 Princess Street in what was then the west end of the city, and served as one of two main transfer points for all Kingston Transit routes and the starting point for the city's annual Santa Claus parade. Originally an outdoor mall, it was converted to an enclosed indoor mall in 1970–71, and once boasted 78 stores including the two-storey Sears and a Loblaws supermarket.

The Kingston Shopping Centre retained the title of largest shopping centre in the area until the Cataraqui Town Centre was constructed in 1982 in the former Kingston Township. Before then, its closest rival was the Frontenac Mall, built in 1967 as Kingston's first enclosed mall with 57 stores, anchored by Woolco.

Kingston Shopping Centre's retail traffic, once brisk, sharply declined after the relocation of Sears to the Cataraqui Town Centre in 1999. The Loblaws supermarket, relocated into a new building constructed on the site of the former Sears store, became sole anchor. This move, combined with the disappearance of smaller department stores including Biway Stores, Family Fair, Marks and Spencer, Zellers and Woolworth, left Kingston Shopping Centre without a department store anchor. With one end of the mall a grocery store, the opposite end of the mall (which originally held Loblaws and a food court) was left as an empty ghostbox and eventually boarded up; it was the first section to be razed during the demolition of the remaining indoor mall building in 2004.

Fewer than a dozen retail tenants remained at the time of demolition: a barber shop, a health food store, two banks, a grocery store, a drugstore, a camera store and a restaurant. These businesses were moved to new buildings constructed in what had been the parking lot of the original indoor mall and remain in operation.

The former department store site is currently occupied by the Loblaws grocery store building, with the rest of the greyfield re-used for new retail construction or left vacant. No part of the original mall structure remains.

The area near the mall includes a large number of apartment buildings built in the 1960s and '70s, with a high percentage of senior citizen residents who made up a large portion of the mall's clientele. Some have complained that the site is "not as pedestrian-friendly as they (the developers) guaranteed it was going to be."

== Bus terminal ==
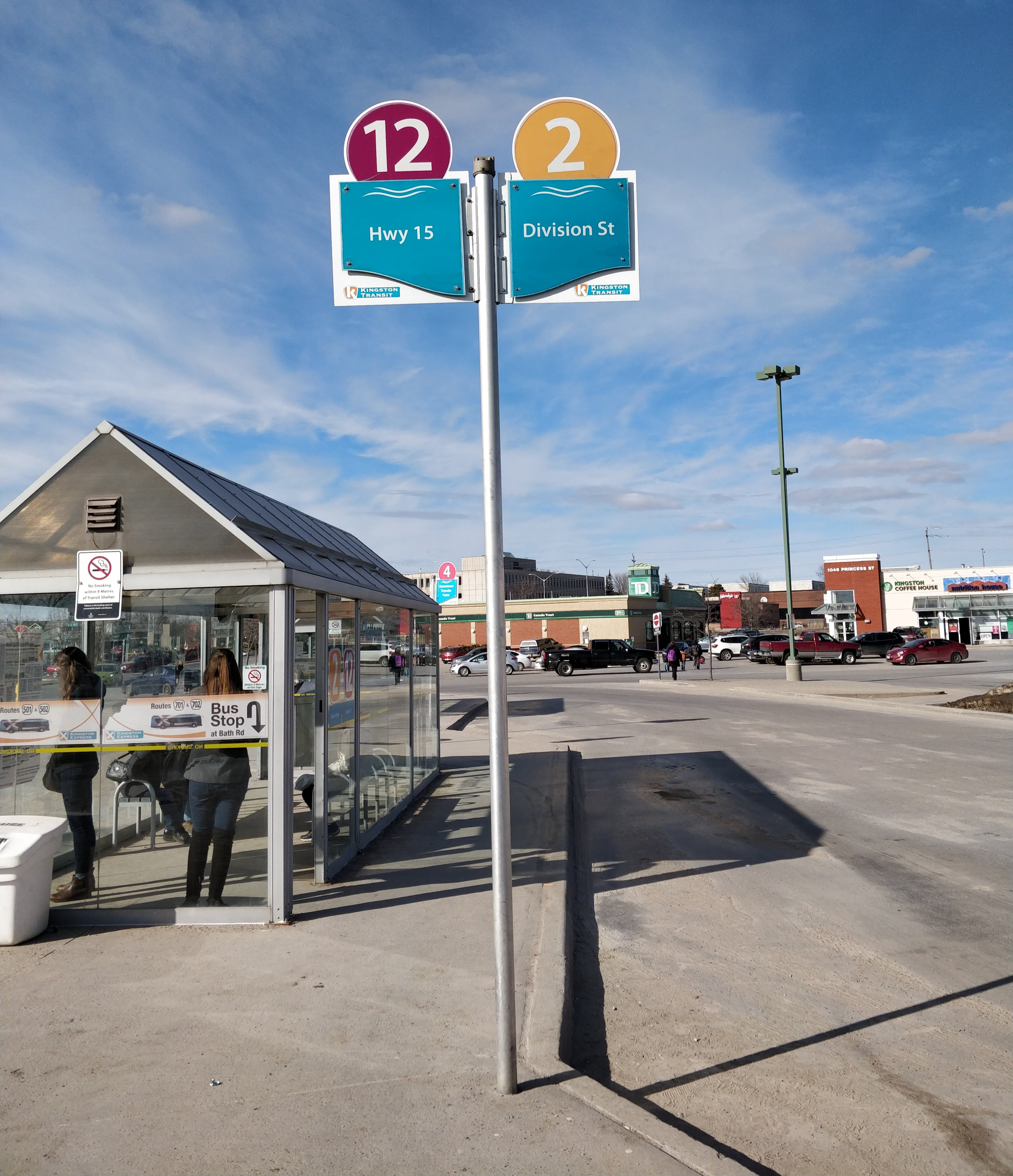
Kingston Centre Transfer Point platform 4 showing routes that formerly served this hub

Kingston Centre Transfer Point is located in the heart of the shopping centre and is a major transfer point for Kingston Transit. It services daytime routes 4, 11, 16, and 31/32 which pass through this major transfer point, connecting to other points of interest in Kingston such as St. Lawrence College, Downtown, or Cataraqui Mall. Express routes 501/502 and 701/702 as well as the overnight route N1 also connect with the Kingston Centre through nearby road stops on Princess Street, Bath Road, and Sir John A. MacDonald Boulevard respectively.

== Anchors & majors ==
- Loblaws
- Canadian Tire
- Rexall

== See also ==
- Princess Street (Kingston, Ontario)
