= Kingston Center Historic District =

Historic district in Massachusetts, United States

- U.S. National Register of Historic Places
- U.S. Historic district
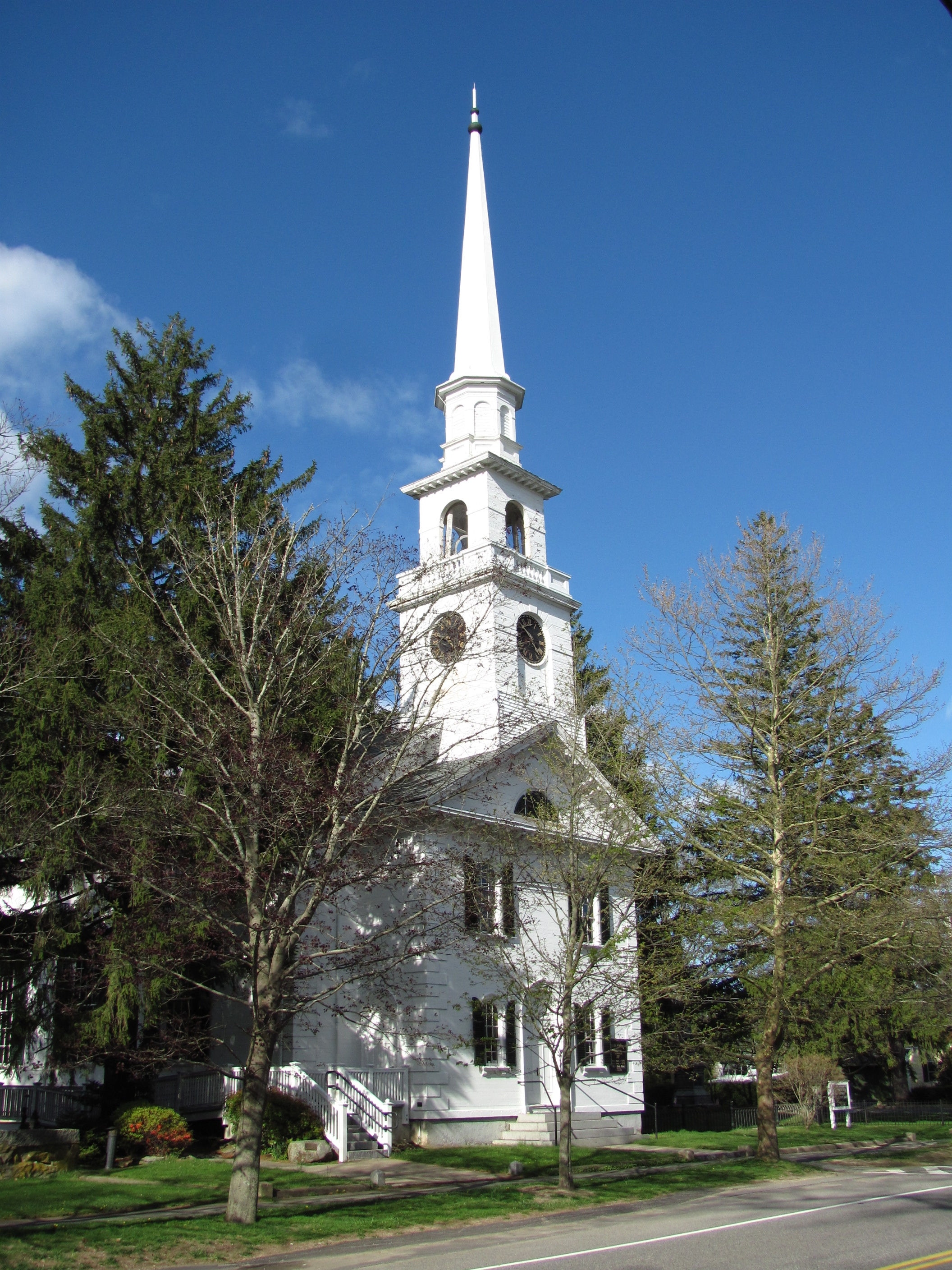
- First Congregational Parish

- Location within Massachusetts Location within the United States
- Location: Kingston, Massachusetts
- Coordinates: 41°59′42″N 70°44′0″W
- Area: 30 acres (12 ha)
- Built: 1802
- Architectural style: Federal, Greek Revival
- NRHP reference No.: 02001085
- Added to NRHP: October 4, 2002

The Kingston Center Historic District is a historic district encompassing the center of Kingston, Massachusetts. The district is about 30 acres (12 ha) in size, and extends along Main Street (Massachusetts Route 106) between the First Parish Unitarian Church and the Mayflower Congregational Church, and for a short way along Green Street to the Evergreen Cemetery. At its center is the Training Green (established 1720) and Kingston Town Hall.

The district was listed on the National Register of Historic Places in 2002.

== See also ==
- National Register of Historic Places listings in Plymouth County, Massachusetts
