= Voyageur Colonial Bus Lines =

Canadian intercity bus company

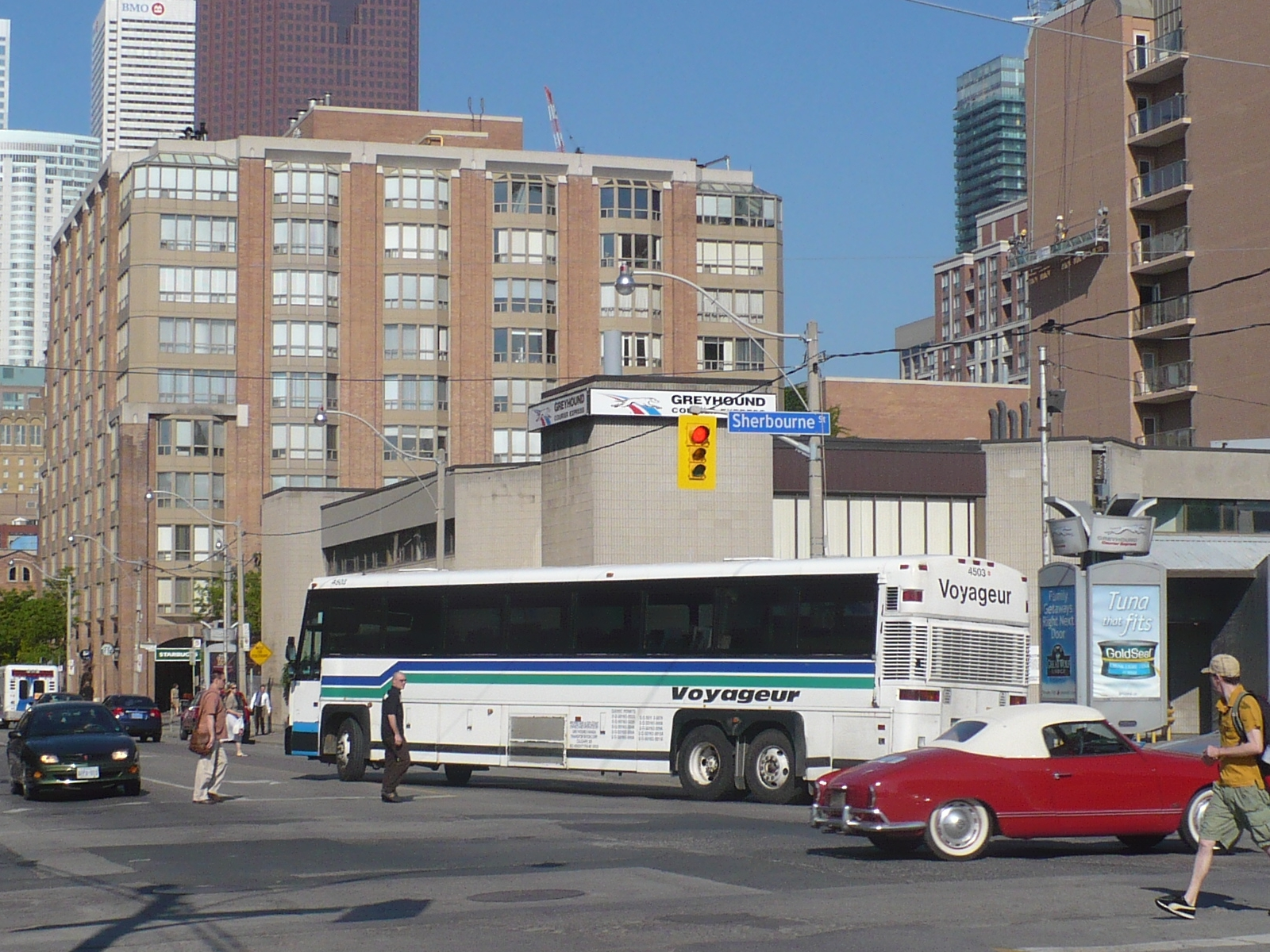
- Voyageur bus leaving the Greyhound Courier Express depot in Toronto in June 2008
- Parent: Greyhound Canada
- Founded: 1928
- Service area: Eastern Ontario, Western Quebec
- Service type: Intercity bus service
- Website: www.greyhound.ca

Voyageur Colonial Bus Lines, commonly called Voyageur Colonial or just Voyageur, was a Canadian intercity bus company that serves Eastern Ontario and Western Quebec, primarily the cities of Montreal, Ottawa and Kingston, Toronto. It was acquired by Greyhound Canada in 1998.

== History ==
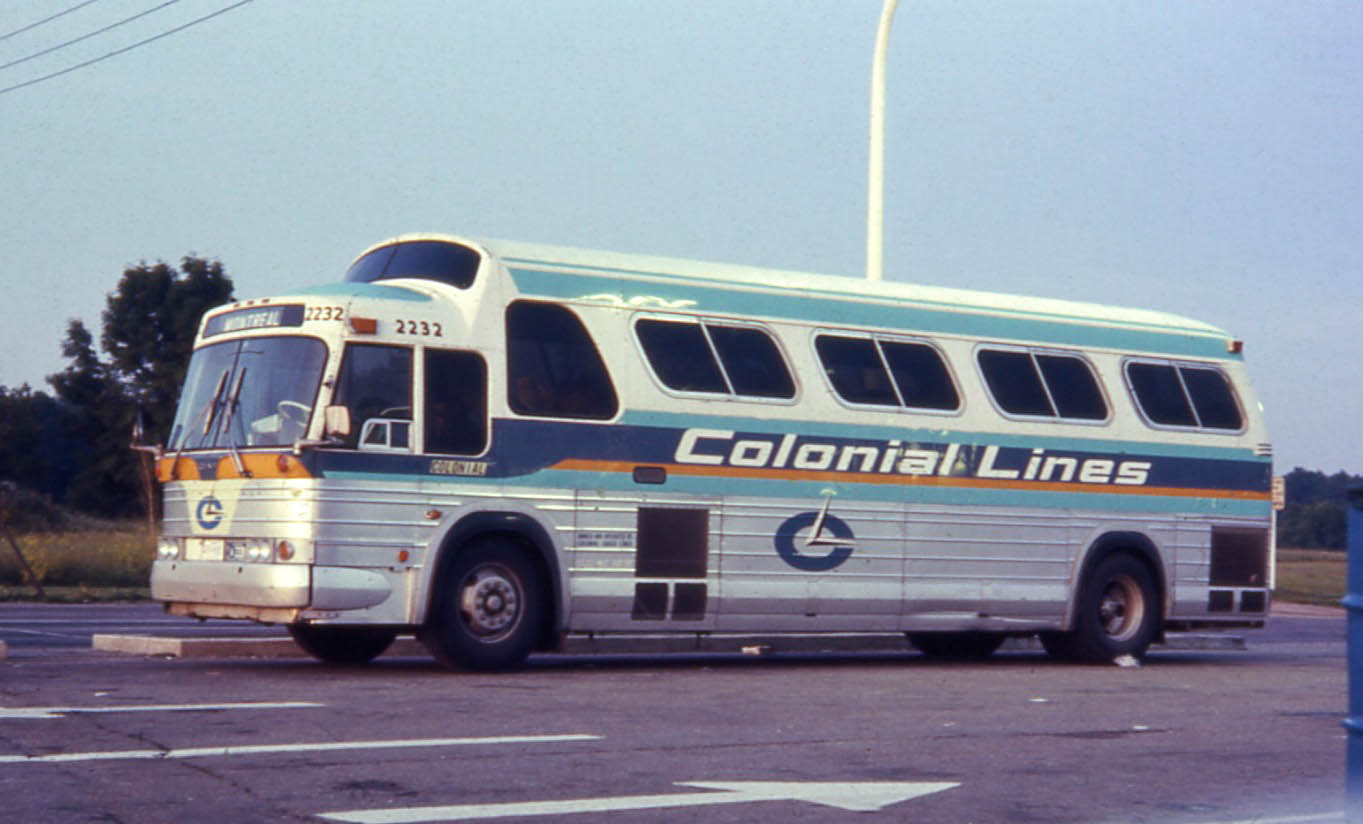
A Colonial Coach Lines bus in 1968

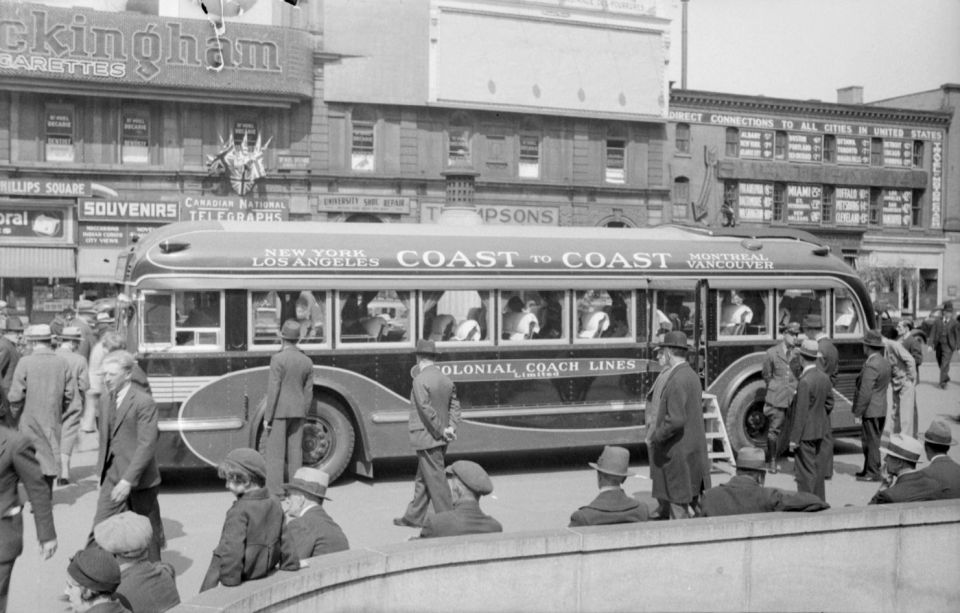
A Colonial Coach Lines bus on the square of the Phillips Street in Montreal,1937.

Voyageur Colonial Limited was incorporated on January 7, 1928, as Colonial Coach Lines Ltd., which ran buses between Renfrew, Ottawa, Morrisburg and Kingston, Ontario. In 1930 Colonial was purchased by the Provincial Transport Company (la Compagnie de Transport-Provincial), which had been incorporated in November 1928 and acquired 31 bus lines in the Montreal area in June 1929. Colonial expanded during the 1930s and 1940s, acquiring many other operators, including the Toronto–Montreal Road Coach Line, the J. Gill Bus Line, Collacutt Coach Lines, Kawartha Lakes Coach Lines and Pony Bus Lines Ltd.

In Quebec, Provincial was affiliated with the Montreal Tramways Company until 1948. Operations included intercity bus service throughout the province and transit operations (through subsidiaries) in Sherbrooke, Quebec City, Kingston and elsewhere. In 1969, after 40 years of operation, all of Provincial Transport Enterprises' subsidiaries were unified under the Voyageur name. At the same time, Colonial Coach Lines was renamed Voyageur Colonial Ltd.

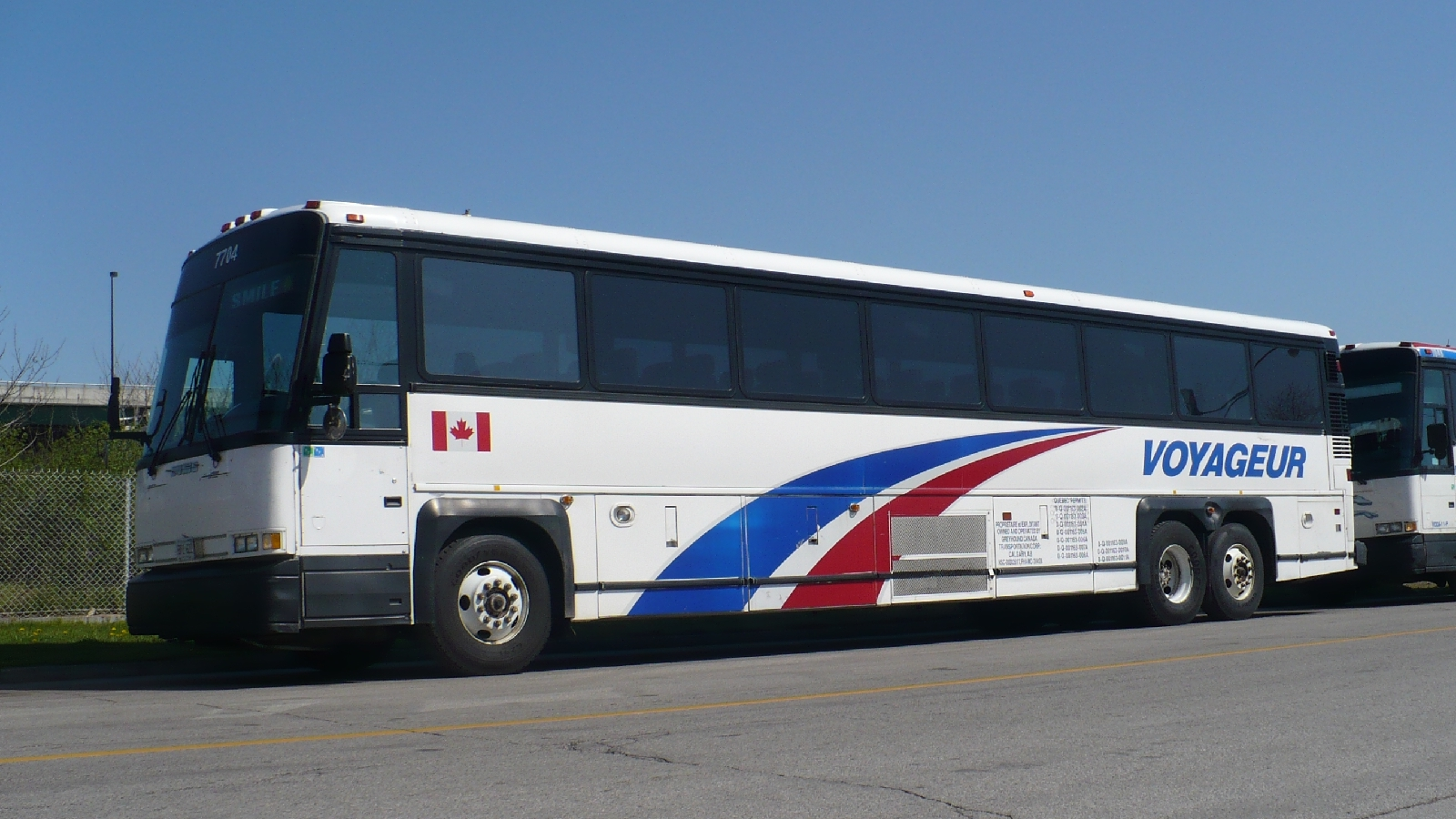
Voyageur bus with Greyhound family stripes

At various times Voyageur operated a number of subsidiaries, including Voyageur Abitibi (based in Val d'Or), Voyageur Inc., Voyageur Provincial (both headquartered in Montréal) and Voyageur Quebec. By 1981 the company was owned by Canada Steamship Lines Inc., 50% owned by Paul Martin's family. The Quebec routes were sold to Orléans Express in July 1990, and in 1994 Greyhound purchased key Ottawa and Toronto routes from Voyageur. In 1998 CSL sold Voyageur to Greyhound Canada.

== See also ==
- Gare d'autocars de Montréal
- Greyhound Canada
- Keolis Canada
- Kingston Bus Terminal
- Ottawa Central Station
