= Gananoque (disambiguation) =

Gananoque is a town in Ontario, Canada.

It can also refer to the following items related to the town:

- Gananoque River, a river with its mouth at the town of Gananoque
- Gananoque Lake, a lake of eastern Ontario, Canada
- Gananoque Islanders, a Canadian Junior "C" ice hockey based in Gananoque
- Gananoque Airport
- Gananoque railway station
- Gananoque & Rideau Railway, historic railway also known as Thousand Islands Railway

Ships named after the town

- Gananoque (ship), a clipper ship of 1857
- HMCS Gananoque (J259), Bangor-class minesweeper, a Canadian warship
