= Bay of Quinte Railway =

Railway in Ontario, Canada

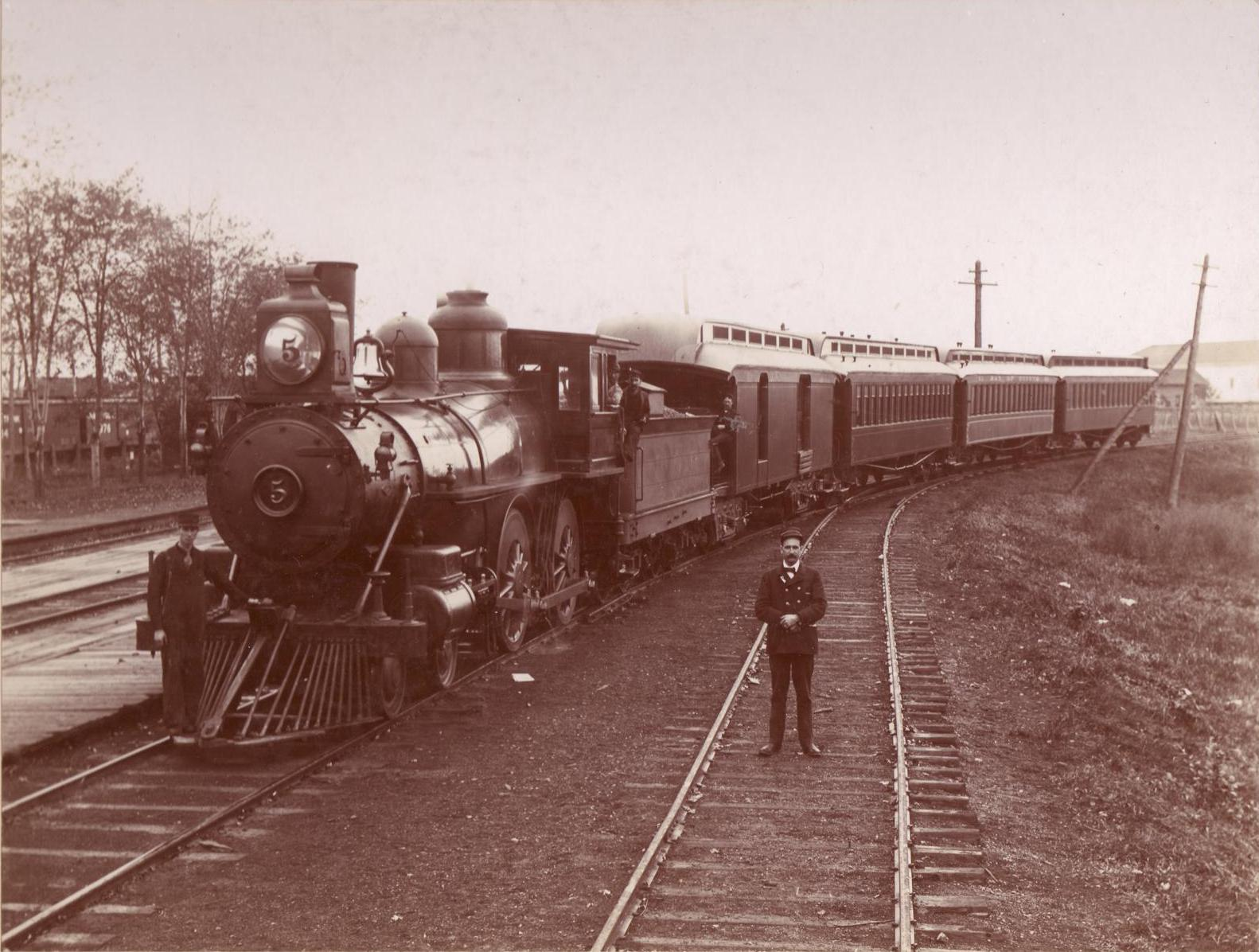
- Bay of Quinte Railway Engine #5 and its crew, about to leave Napanee for Deseronto, c. 1900–1903.

Overview
- Headquarters: Deseronto, Ontario
- Reporting mark: BQ
- Dates of operation: 1897–1910
- Predecessor: Napanee, Tamworth and Quebec Railway (1879); Bay of Quinte Railway and Navigation Company (1881)
- Successor: Canadian Northern Railway (now Canadian National Railway)

Technical
- Track gauge: 4 ft 8 1/2 in (1,435 mm) standard gauge

The Bay of Quinte Railway (reporting mark BQ) was a short-line railway in eastern Ontario, Canada. It was formed as the Napanee, Tamworth and Quebec Railway (NT&QR), chartered in 1878 by Edward Rathbun and Alexander Campbell, with plans to run from Napanee through Renfrew County and on to the Ottawa Valley. Lacking funding from the governments, development never began.

Rathburn took over the charter in 1881. He started construction with the shorter Bay of Quinte Railway and Navigation Company (BQR&NC) that ran from his factories in Deseronto to the Grand Trunk Railway mainline at Napanee. Construction on the NT&QR out of Napanee through Yarkers to Tamworth started the same year, but was abandoned by the contractor and Rathbun had to pay the workers out of pocket.

The line finally opened to Tamworth in 1884. In 1889 it was extended westward to Tweed while a branch eastward from Yarker to Harrowsmith connected to the Kingston and Pembroke Railway with running rights to Kingston. In 1890 the line was renamed the Kingston, Napanee & Western Railway, and the next year it was leased to the BQR&NC. The eastern branch was extended from Harrowsmith to Sydenham in 1893. In 1897, the two sections were legally merged into the newly formed Bay of Quinte Railway. In 1903 the final expansion was made northwestward from Tweed to connect to the Central Ontario Railway at Bannockburn, with a total of 134 kilometres (83 mi).

The line was purchased by the Canadian Northern Railway (CNoR) in 1910, using its line from Napanee through Sydenham as the basis of a major expansion to Smiths Falls and onto Ottawa. CNoR's bankruptcy in 1918, followed by the Grand Trunk in 1923 led to the formation of the Canadian National Railways (CNR). Parts of the network were closed starting in 1935, and the last BQR fragment, from Napanee's historic 1856 Grand Trunk station to a Goodyear tire factory, was disconnected from the CN mainline at Napanee station in 2010.

== History ==
In 1848, an American partnership purchased land near Culbertson's Wharf, building a sawmill to process logs from four million acres of timberland in the Trent River, Moira River, Salmon River and Napanee River watersheds. In 1855, Hugo Burghardt Rathbun moved to the area to take over the running of the business under the Rathbun Company name. The growing village was incorporated in 1871 as Mill Point and was renamed Deseronto in 1881.

Hugo's son, Edward Wilkes Rathbun expanded the company's enterprises, opening a cedar mill, a flour mill and a sash, door and blind factory; he operated tugboats and lake freighters to carry cargo to Oswego, New York. He later added four passenger ships and, by the 1880s, held a stake in three railways: the Bay of Quinte Railway, the Napanee and Tamworth Railway and Gananoque's Thousand Islands Railway. He operated a 250-acre farm to provide horses for the logging operations and railway car shops to build rolling stock, along with general stores, a newspaper and various manufacturing works.

At its 1895 peak, Deseronto's population reached 3338 people and Edward Wilkes Rathbun was a millionaire; an 1896 fire on the timber docks did a quarter-million dollars on damage, and the gradual depletion of natural resources (timber and minerals) on which the Rathbun business relied brought the company's activities to a halt by 1916. The Bay of Quinte railway, originally constructed to bring Rathbun's timber to market, was sold to Canadian Northern Railway in 1910 for inclusion in its Ottawa-Toronto mainline. CNoR reached the Pacific coast by 1915, but by 1918, it was bankrupt. Canadian National took over the CNoR network in 1923, embargoing the former BQR mainline in 1979 and removing the tracks in 1986.

== Network ==
The BQR was constructed in multiple segments:

- The Bay of Quinte Navigation and Railway Company's own line ran from Napanee to Deseronto. It originally carried freight from Rathbun's steamships "Deseronto" and "Quinte", which ran Napanee-Deseronto-Picton, to the Grand Trunk Railway mainline.
- Rathbun was one of multiple stakeholders in an 1879 Napanee, Tamworth and Quebec Railway which continued from Napanee to Tamworth, connecting to the Grand Trunk Railway in Napanee. The line was extended to Tweed before running out of money, but never reached Ottawa-Hull. Renamed the Kingston, Napanee and Western, it was leased to the BQR; the NT&Q and BQR lines were eventually merged.
- An 1889 extension from Tamworth to Harrowsmith allowed connection to the Kingston and Pembroke Railway to reach Kingston.
- An 1893 extension from Harrowsmith reached mica mines at Sydenham Lake.
- A 1902 branch line joined the BQR mainline at Yarker to the Central Ontario Railway at Bannockburn, Ontario.

CNoR incorporated the BQR line into its own mainline to Smiths Falls; CN abandoned the Tweed to Bannockburn line in 1935 and Tweed to Yarker in 1941, leaving just the Smiths Falls mainline. That line was embargoed in 1979, abandoned in 1984 and removed in 1986. The 104 kilometres (65 mi) right of way from Smiths Falls to Strathcona, near Napanee, is now the Cataraqui Trail, a multi-use recreational trail operated by the Cataraqui Region Conservation Authority.

The Bay of Quinte Navigation and Railway Company also owned the Rathbun dock in Gananoque, Ontario; it entered a contract in which that town raised $10,000 in debentures in return for a short line to be constructed from GTR's Gananoque railway station to the downtown waterfront. This Thousand Islands Railway is now defunct, but one locomotive has been preserved at the former station beside Gananoque's town hall.

== Incidents ==
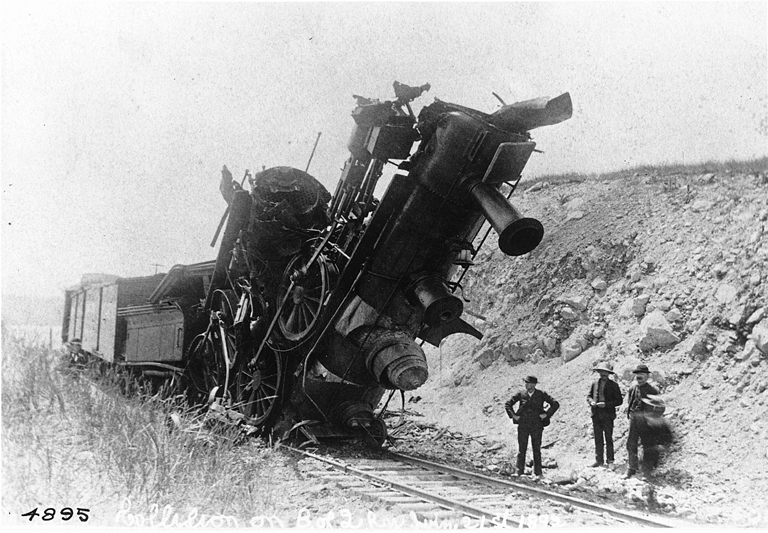
1892 collision between two BQR engines

An 1892 McCord Museum archival photo depicts a head-on collision between two Bay of Quinte Railway engines.

On October 2, 1912, a BQR train derailed on a curve on the K&P line five miles north of Kingston, sending the second car from the engine and four freight cars, the mail car and a passenger car down a 12–15 foot embankment, killing two passengers. The engine reached Kingston unharmed.

== Legacy ==
The BQR is a ghost rail line and very little remains to mark its role as a connecting link in CNoR's ultimately failed ambition to build a third viable national rail network. On most of the former Smiths Falls - Deseronto CNoR line, the tracks were removed in the 1980s. CNoR's Smiths Falls station became the Railway Museum of Eastern Ontario; a few BQR stations in small villages were converted to private residences.

== See also ==
- List of Ontario railways
- List of defunct Canadian railways
