= Francis Theodore Frost =

Canadian manufacturer and politician (1843–1916)

The Honourable Francis Theodore Frost
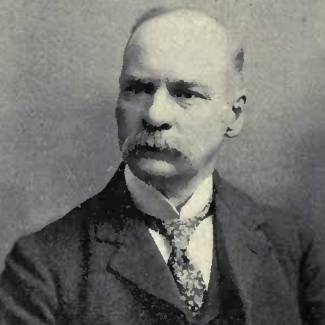

Member of Parliament for Leeds North and Grenville North
- In office 1896–1900
- Preceded by: Charles Frederick Ferguson
- Succeeded by: John R. Lavell

Canadian Senator from Ontario
- In office March 12, 1903 – August 25, 1916
- Appointed by: Wilfrid Laurier

Personal details
- Born: December 21, 1843 Smiths Falls, Canada West
- Died: August 25, 1916 (aged 72) Smiths Falls, Ontario, Canada
- Party: Liberal

Francis Theodore Frost (December 21, 1843 – August 25, 1916) was a Canadian manufacturer and politician.

== Background ==
Born in Smiths Falls, Canada West, the son of Ebenezer Frost and Caroline Harwood, he was educated in Smiths Falls, Coventry, Vermont and Potsdam, New York. In 1868, he married Maria E. Powell.

His father Ebenezer Frost had founded Frost & Wood, a manufacturer of farm implements, in Smiths Falls in the 1840s. Under Francis Frost it became one of the largest foundries in Canada and one of the largest farm implement manufacturers in the Commonwealth.

Frost was reeve of Smiths Falls from 1876 to 1883 and became the town's first mayor in 1883. Frost also served as warden for Lanark County. He sat on the local School Board and was the Sunday School Superintendent of his local church for many years. When Andrew Carnegie founded a Carnegie Library in Smiths Falls, Frost and his brother donated a like amount for its maintenance. In 1895 Frost had the grand home Elmcroft in Smiths Falls built for himself and his wife.

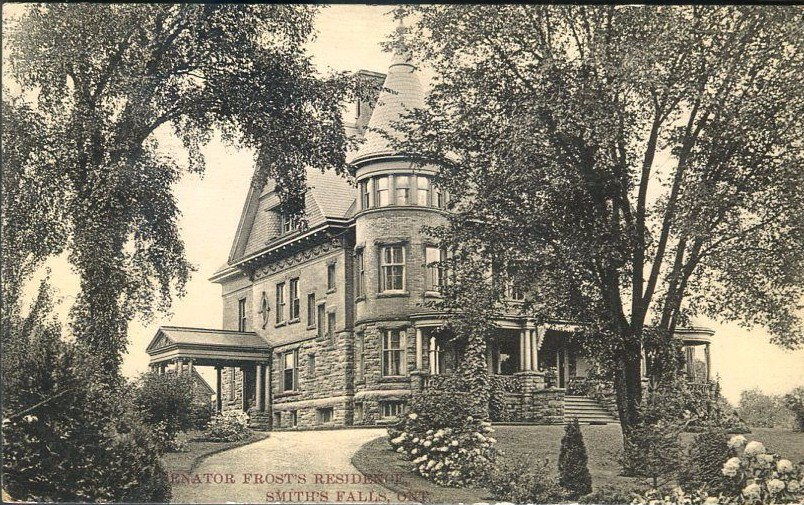
Elmcroft, the house Frost built in Smiths Falls in 1895.

Frost was defeated three times (in the 1878, 1882, and 1891 elections) before being elected to the House of Commons of Canada in the 1896 federal election in the Ontario riding of Leeds North and Grenville North. A Liberal, he was defeated in the 1900 federal election.

In 1902 Frost was appointed to the Ottawa Improvement Commission, the original predecessor to the National Capital Commission, and was involved with the original establishment in Ottawa of Rockliffe Park and the drive from Rideau Hall to Parliament Hill and along the Rideau Canal.

In 1903, he was appointed Director of Imperial Guarantee and Accident Insurance Company of Canada, and was also appointed to the Senate of Canada to represent the senatorial division of Leeds and Grenville, Ontario.

Maclean's magazine's predecessor The Busy Man's Magazine featured an article on Senator Frost's commercial genius and his political and community passions in August 1908.

Senator Frost died in office in 1916.

Frost & Wood was acquired by, Cockshutt Plow Company in 1924 and continued as a division into the 1950s. During World War II Frost & Wood was largely converted to the war effort and manufactured hand grenades, shell casings and parts for Avro Lancaster Bomber aircraft. The Frost & Wood Smith Falls complex was completely demolished in the early 1960s.

== Electoral record ==
1878 Canadian federal election: Leeds North and Grenville North
| Party | Candidate | Votes |
|---|---|---|
| Liberal–Conservative | Charles Frederick Ferguson | 859 |
| Conservative | Francis Jones | 823 |

1882 Canadian federal election: Leeds North and Grenville North
| Party | Candidate | Votes |
|---|---|---|
| Liberal–Conservative | Charles Frederick Ferguson | 1,048 |
| Liberal | Francis Theodore Frost | 762 |

1887 Canadian federal election: Leeds North and Grenville North
| Party | Candidate | Votes |
|---|---|---|
| Liberal–Conservative | Charles Frederick Ferguson | 1,140 |
| Conservative | Angus Buchanan | 747 |
| Liberal | George Eldon Kidd | 291 |

1891 Canadian federal election: Leeds North and Grenville North
| Party | Candidate | Votes |
|---|---|---|
| Liberal–Conservative | Charles Frederick Ferguson | 1,311 |
| Liberal | Francis Theodore Frost | 1,165 |

1896 Canadian federal election: Leeds North and Grenville North
| Party | Candidate | Votes |
|---|---|---|
| Liberal | Francis Theodore Frost | 1,432 |
| Conservative | John Reeve Lavell | 1,423 |

1900 Canadian federal election: Leeds North and Grenville North
| Party | Candidate | Votes |
|---|---|---|
| Conservative | John Reeve Lavell | 1,590 |
| Liberal | Francis Theodore Frost | 1,267 |
