= John Reeve Lavell =

Canadian politician

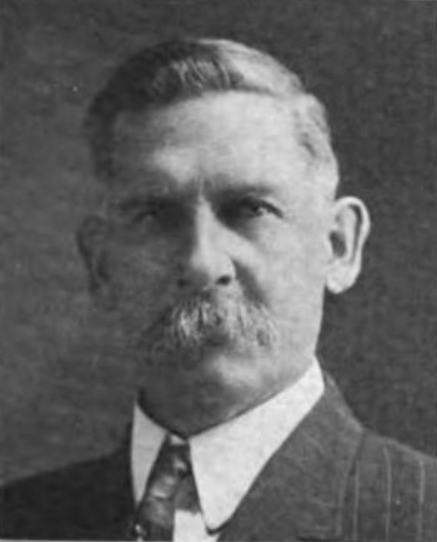

Member of the House of Commons of Canada
- In office 1900–1904
- Constituency: Leeds North and Grenville North

Personal details
- Born: December 11, 1857; Peterborough, Canada West
- Died: January 10, 1925 (aged 67); Edmonton, Alberta
- Political party: Conservative
- Spouse: U. P. Macalister (m. 1883)
- Occupation: Lawyer, politician

John Reeve Lavell (December 11, 1857 – January 10, 1925) was a lawyer and political figure in Ontario, Canada. He represented Leeds North and Grenville North in the House of Commons of Canada from 1900 to 1904 as a Conservative.

== Biography ==
He was born in Peterborough, Canada West, the son of M. Lavell and B. B. Reeve, and was educated at Queen's University. In 1883, he married U. P. Macalister. Lavell served on the town council for Smiths Falls and was reeve for Smiths Falls. He was an unsuccessful candidate for a federal seat in 1896, losing to Francis Theodore Frost; Lavell defeated Frost in the 1900 federal election.

Lavell contested the 1917 Alberta general election as a member of the Alberta Conservative Party in the Sedgewick electoral district, subsequently losing to Premier Charles Stewart.

He died in Edmonton in January 1925.
