= Thousand Islands Railway =

Historic rail line (1884-1995)

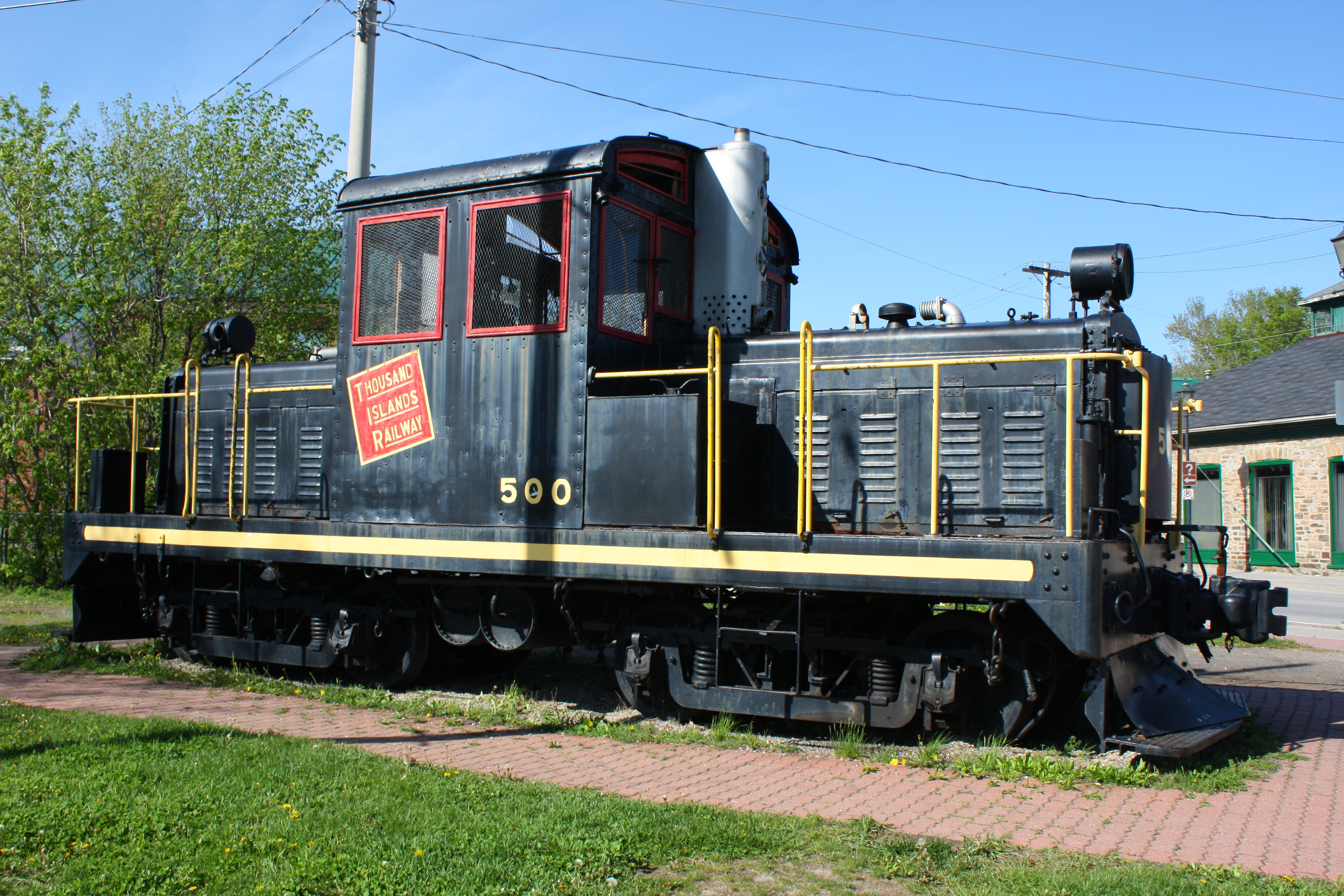
- Thousand Islands Railway locomotive 500 preserved in Gananoque

Overview
- Headquarters: Gananoque, Ontario, Canada
- Dates of operation: 1884–1958
- Successor: Canadian National Railway

The Thousand Islands Railway (originally Gananoque & Rideau Railway) was an 8 km (5.0 mi) long railway running from the town of Gananoque north to the Grand Trunk Railway (now CN) Toronto-Montreal mainline, just south of present-day Cheeseborough. The service ran for 111 years between 1884 and 1995. The rails were removed in October 1997.

== History ==
The railway was originally incorporated as Gananoque & Rideau Railway on 15 February 1871, but construction did not begin until 1883 due to lack of money. The town provided tax breaks and $10,000 in debenture financing to Rathbun's Bay of Quinte Railway and Navigation Company to build the line; that company already operated steamship docks in the village. The original 5-kilometre (3.1 mi) line opened 1 January 1884. The company name was changed to Thousand Islands Railway four months later. A swing bridge over the mouth of the Gananoque River was constructed in 1894 to provide service to businesses on the east side of the river.

The line originally served to carry timber and freight to Gananoque's docks, where it could be loaded onto ships. While available timber stocks soon diminished, passenger traffic increased as the Grand Trunk under Charles Melville Hays promoted the tiny town as a vacation destination.

The original junction between the Thousand Island Railway and the Grand Trunk Railway was moved 2.5 kilometres (1.6 mi) east in 1902 to a flatter location. A 1947 map of the Gananoque terminal shows a nine-switch track arrangement, a coal/wood yard, a coal dealer, a number company, a mill, the Cow and Gate dairy, a two-stall engine house, passenger station and freight/express building.

The Thousand Islands Railway was merged into the Canadian National Railway in 1958. Passenger service ended in 1962; freight service ended in 1995. The line was dismantled in 1997.

== What remains today ==
The unique locomotive #500 is preserved at Sculpture Park, where King Street crosses the Gananoque River. The waterfront station became a restaurant after passenger service ended, but was destroyed by fire in 1990; the 1000 Islands History Museum was built on the site. The former right-of-way is readily visible on satellite imagery, and is now a hiking trail. The Gananoque Junction station remains on Station Road which is 1.2 kilometres (0.75 mi) west of Hiscocks Road.
