= Smiths Falls station =

Railway station in Ontario, Canada

Smiths Falls
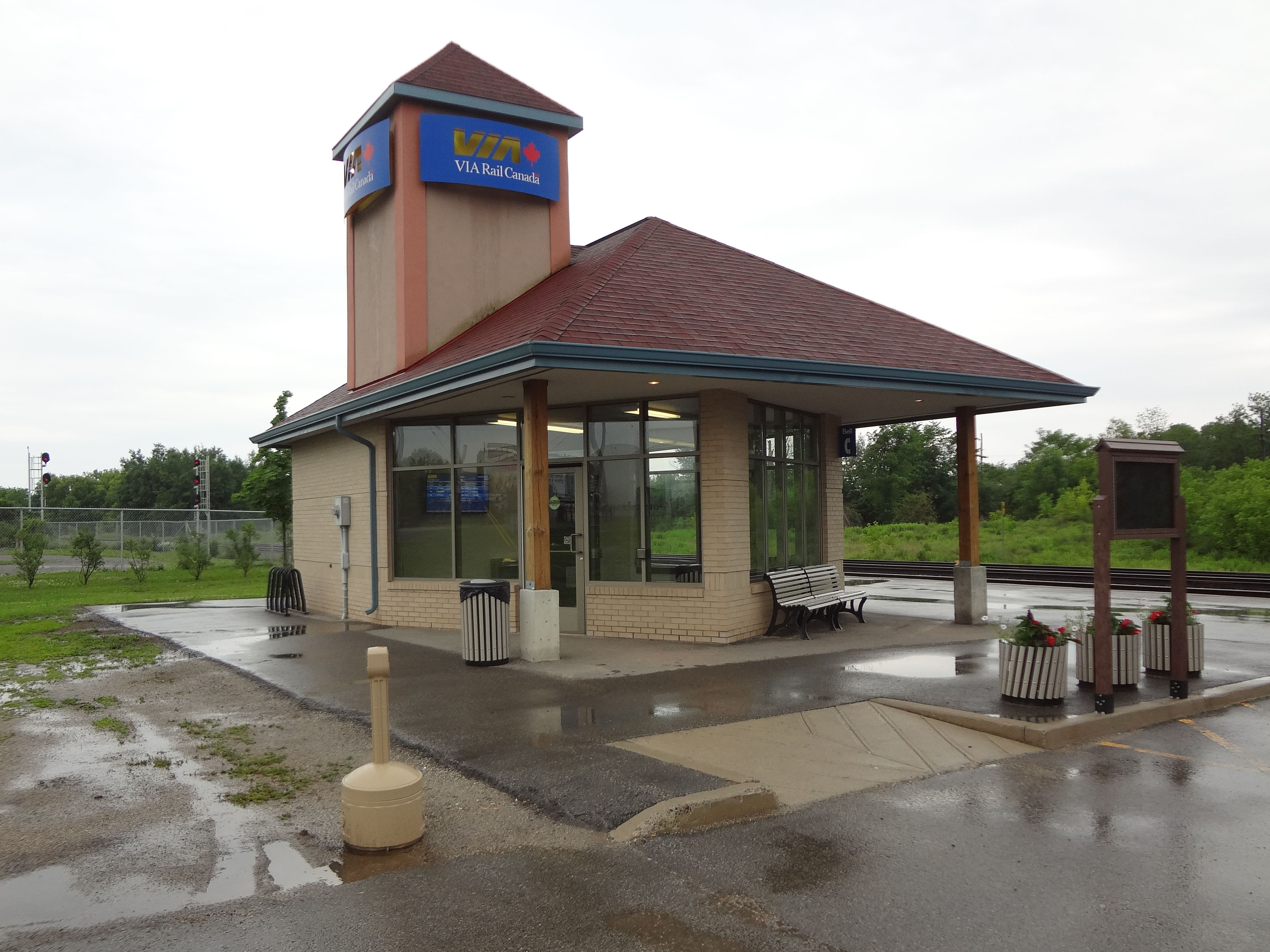

General information
- Location: 46 Union Street, Smiths Falls, Ontario; Canada
- Coordinates: 44°54′45″N 76°01′26″W
- Owner: Via Rail
- Platforms: 1 side platform
- Tracks: 1

Construction
- Structure type: Unstaffed station
- Parking: 22 spaces (surface lot)
- Accessible: Yes

Other information
- Website: Smiths Falls train station

History
- Opened: c. 2010

Services
Preceding station	Via Rail	Following station
Brockville toward Toronto	Toronto–Ottawa	Fallowfield toward Ottawa
Location
- Location within Southern Ontario Location within Ontario Location within Canada

Smiths Falls railway station in Smiths Falls, Ontario, Canada is served by Via Rail Corridor trains running between Montreal and Ottawa. It is unstaffed, with outdoor parking, telephones and washrooms. Accessible parking, automatic doors and wheelchair access is available to the platform. Wheelchair lift is available at this station.

22 surface lot parking spaces are managed by Indigo Parking. A pay meter is located inside the station; hourly, daily and monthly rates are available.

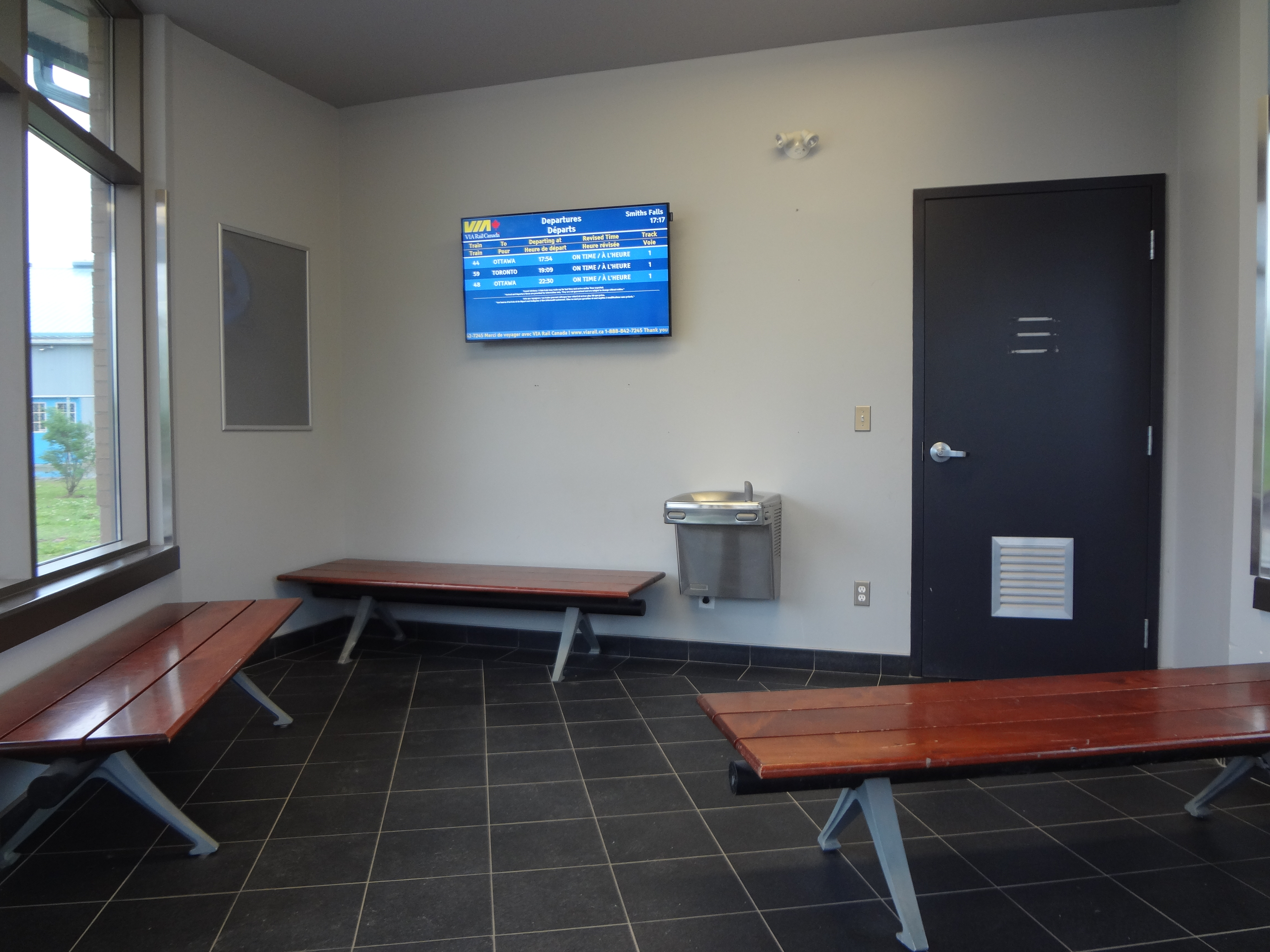
Inside the station

== History ==
=== CPR station ===
The original passenger station building was built by Canadian Pacific Railway in 1887. In 1999, the Smiths Falls Community Theatre began renovations on the station, installing the 140 seat Station Theatre into the old restaurant area. A small waiting area in the building was used by Via Rail until 2010 when the new Via Rail station opened.

=== CNoR station ===
As Smiths Falls is a junction between multiple rail lines, it once had multiple active passenger stations. A 1913 Canadian Northern Ontario Railway station on a now-abandoned line (Canadian National embargoed their Smiths Falls Subdivision between Smiths Falls and Strathcona in 1979) is now a National Historic Site which houses the Railway Museum of Eastern Ontario.

=== New Via Rail station ===
On March 8, 2010, Via Rail announced plans to build and relocate to a new station located just north of downtown. The new station would have a distinctive tower. The new station would reduce scheduling conflicts between passenger and freight trains as the old station is located in the middle of a junction between two busy Canadian Pacific Railway lines and both the Via Rail's Smiths Falls and Brockville Subdivisions. The new station consists of 400 square feet (37 m^{2}) and was constructed with a budget of $750,000.

== Services ==
Smiths Falls station is served by trains on Via Rail's Toronto-Ottawa route, though some express trains pass through the station without stopping.

As of October 2023, the station is served by four to six trains per day toward Ottawa, and two to four trains per day toward Toronto.
