= Cornwall station =

Railway station in Ontario, Canada

Cornwall
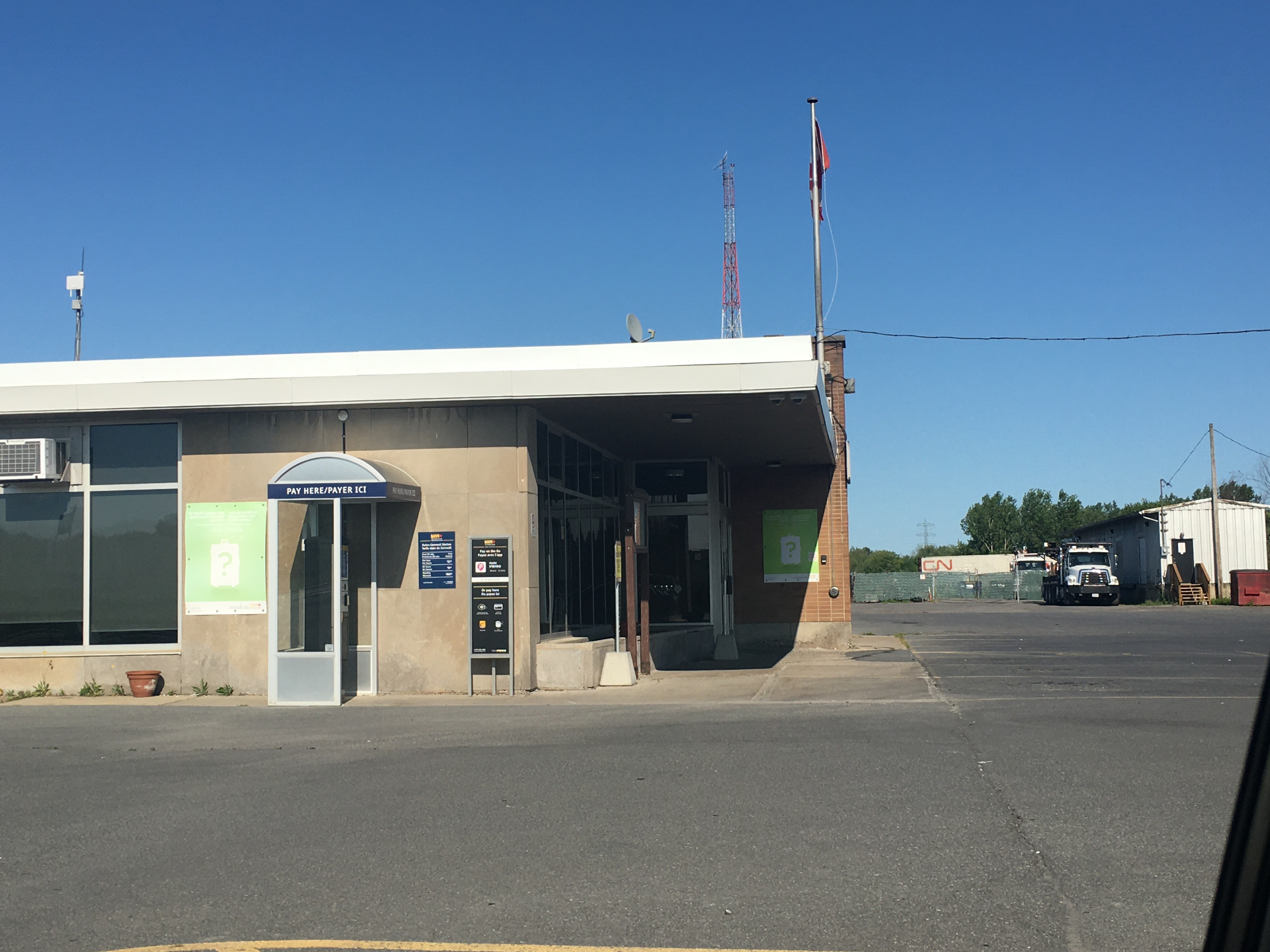
- Station building

General information
- Location: 1650 Station Road; Cornwall, Ontario; Canada
- Coordinates: 45°02′32″N 74°44′36″W
- Owner: Via Rail
- Platforms: 1 side platform, 1 island platform
- Tracks: 2

Construction
- Structure type: Unstaffed station
- Parking: Yes
- Accessible: Yes

Other information
- Website: Cornwall train station

History
- Opened: 23 May 1957

Services
Preceding station	Via Rail	Following station
Brockville toward Toronto	Toronto–Montreal	Dorval toward Montreal
Former services
Preceding station	Canadian National Railway	Following station
Mille Roches toward Sarnia	Grand Trunk Railway; Main Line	Summerstown toward Montreal
Location
- Location within Southern Ontario Location within Ontario Location within Canada

Cornwall railway station in Cornwall, Ontario, Canada is served by Via Rail trains running between Toronto and Montreal.

The station is wheelchair accessible but advance notice has to be given. In 2013, the ticket counter was replaced by a self-service kiosk.

The station is also served by Cornwall Transit Route 1.

== Railway services ==
As of July 2025, Cornwall station is served by 5 to 6 trains per day in each direction.

== History ==
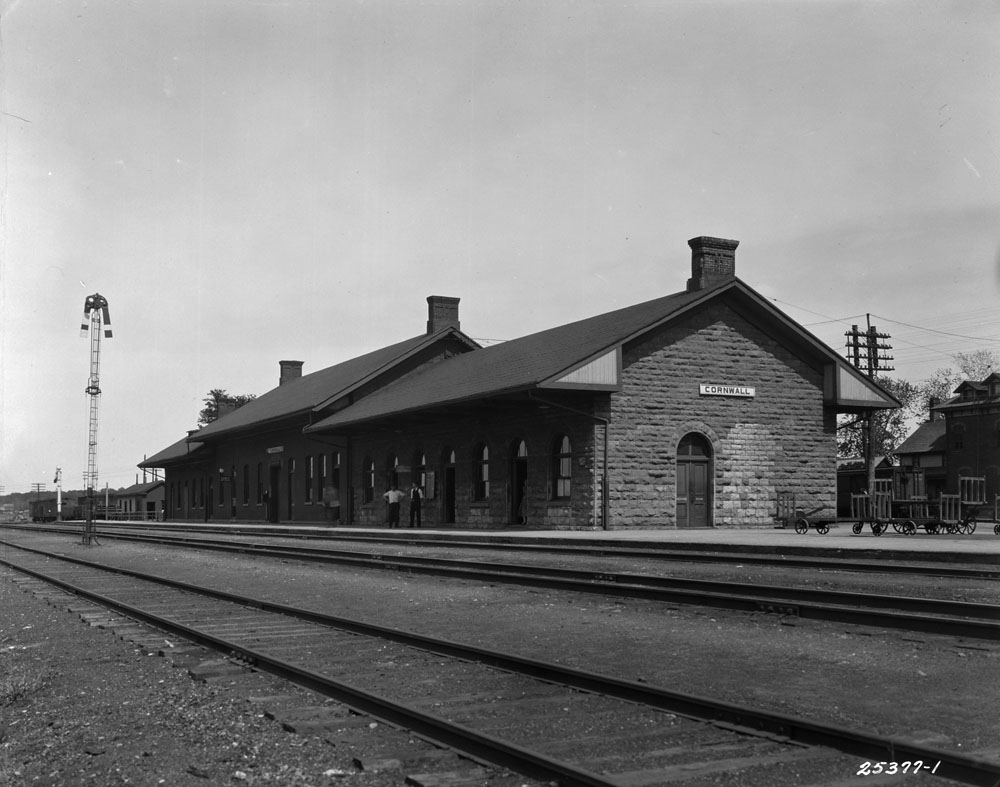
Former GTR/CN station

The Canadian National Railway line was relocated to a more northerly route in 1957 due to construction of the Saint Lawrence Seaway. The Grand Trunk Railway and station originally came to Cornwall in 1856 and the stone CNR station building in downtown was torn down in 1962.
