= Railway Museum of Eastern Ontario =

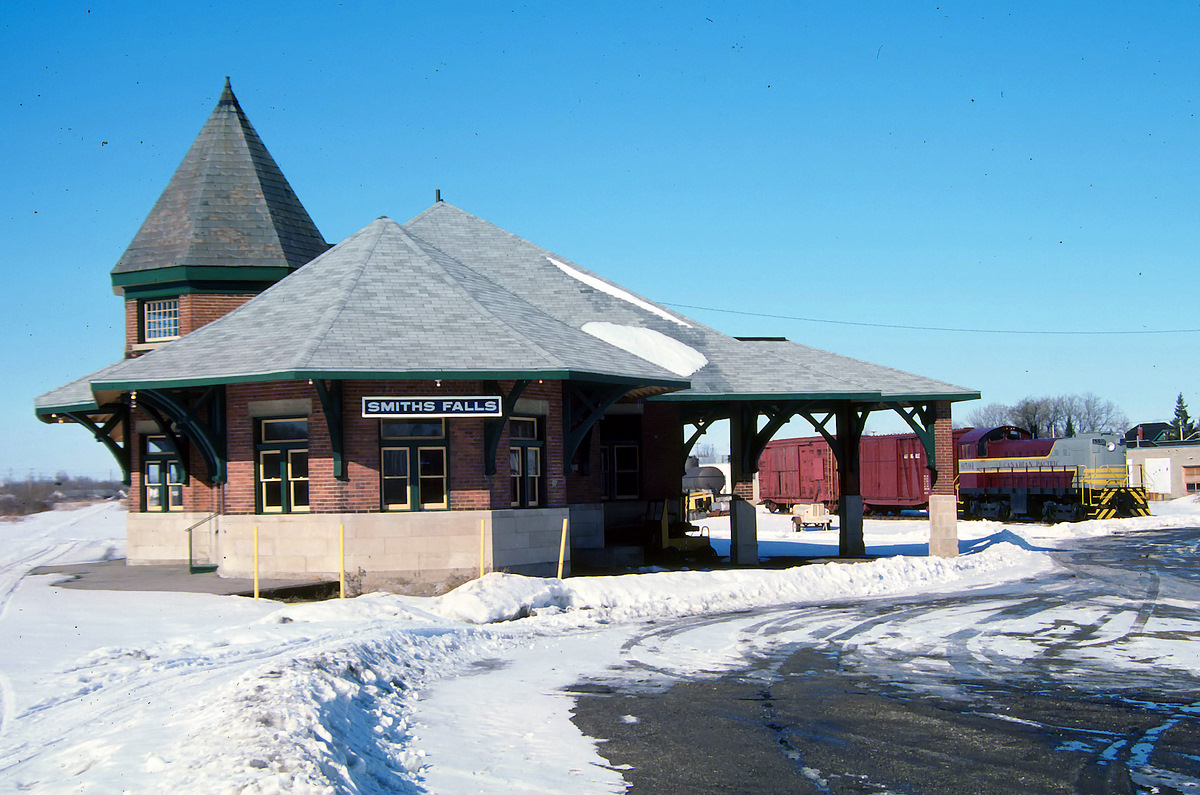
- Established: 1914 (station); 1985 (museum)
- Location: Russell & William Sts, Smiths Falls, Ontario
- Coordinates: 44°54′06″N 76°01′42″W
- Type: railway museum
- Owner: Smiths Falls Railway Museum Association
- Website: rmeo.org

National Historic Site of Canada
- Designated: 1983

The Railway Museum of Eastern Ontario, a rail museum in a former CNoR station, stands on the abandoned right-of-way of a Canadian Northern Railway line which once led southwest toward Napanee. Established 1985 as the Smiths Falls Railway Museum, the RMEO works to preserve the 1913 Canadian Northern (CNoR) station and a collection of historic rolling stock, equipment and railway memorabilia.

== History ==
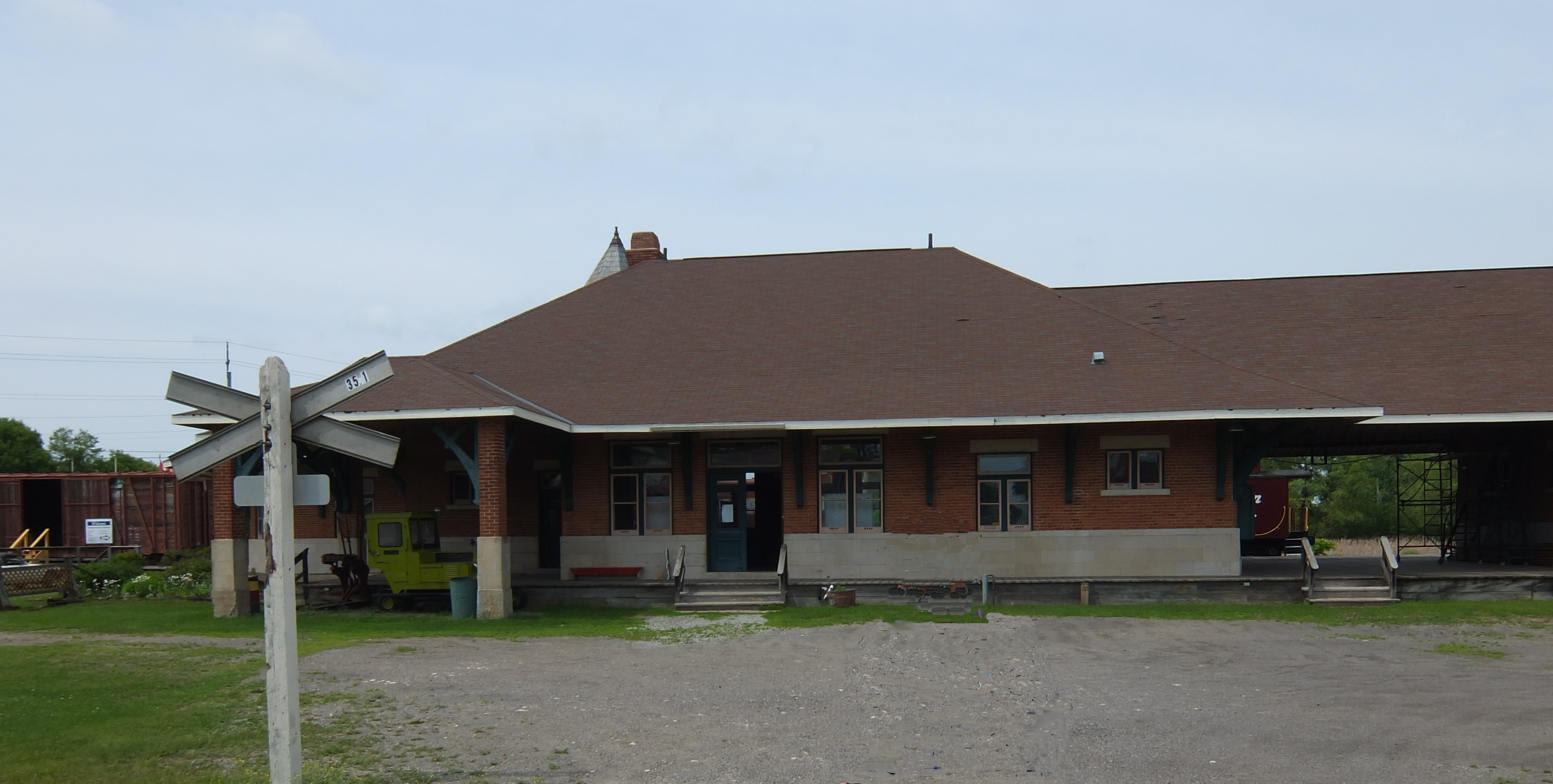
View of the station building in summer 2015

The Canadian Northern Railway (CNoR, 1899–1923) struggled to build a third transcontinental railway from Québec City to Vancouver but ultimately met with financial ruin. Its assets were acquired by Canadian National Railway, which gradually abandoned much of the network as unprofitable or duplicative of its existing lines. Westward from Ottawa, CNoR operated a line through Pembroke and Algonquin Park (now removed) and a line through Smiths Falls which incorporated the CNoR-owned Bay of Quinte Railway from Sydenham to Napanee. The lines split just west of the Canadian Northern Ontario Railway Federal Bridge across the Rideau River. While a portion of CNoR line between Smiths Falls and Ottawa remains in Via Rail passenger service, the line beyond Smiths Falls was embargoed in 1979 and abandoned, along with the local station. (The CPR operated its own, separate Smiths Falls railway station, a divisional point on CP's Montréal-Toronto mainline; VIA used that station until 2010. CP also owned the former Brockville and Ottawa Railway line from Brockville through Smiths Falls to Sand Point, near Arnprior; this created a crossroads of two railways with tracks leading in six directions from Smiths Falls.)

Efforts to save the station date to 1981, a time in which the building was in "a state of disrepair and abandonment" after fifteen years boarded up at trackside. By 1982, the station was at risk of CN demolition; locally opposed demolitions of historic stations in other towns in-region (such as Pembroke) had demonstrated federally regulated railways to be beyond the reach of provincial and local historic preservation laws. The Smiths Falls Railway Museum Association elected an executive in January 1983 and began to collect money, rolling stock and memorabilia for a museum. While the initial effort was led by the local chamber of commerce, it soon gained backing from rail history fans in towns like Perth, Brockville and Merrickville.

The building was initially recognised as a National Historic Site of Canada on November 18, 1983; the museum association also supported a bid to retain a rail bridge across the Rideau Canal as a historic site.

The museum association tried in vain to save the underlying rail line for use by a proposed tourist train to Kingston. (CNoR track did not enter Kingston; historically the BQR had running rights on the "Kick and Push", CP's now-defunct Kingston and Pembroke Railway through Harrowsmith.) In September 1986, CN had sold 58 km of the track to the federal government for redeployment in Western Canada; in December 1986, the museum association raised $13,000 in a few days in an attempt to buy back 2 km of track which CN had sold to a Victoriaville scrap metal dealer.

The 104 kilometres (65 mi) right of way from Smiths Falls to Strathcona, near Napanee, is now the Cataraqui Trail, a multi-use recreational trail operated by the Cataraqui Region Conservation Authority.

Preceding station	Canadian National Railway	Following station
Lombardy toward Napanee	Napanee – Ottawa	Nolans toward Ottawa
