= Leeds North and Grenville North =

Former federal electoral district in Ontario, Canada

Leeds North and Grenville North was a federal electoral district represented in the House of Commons of Canada from 1867 to 1904. It was located in the province of Ontario. It was created by the British North America Act 1867 which allocated one member to the combined riding of the North Riding of Leeds and the North Riding of Grenville.

In 1882, the North Riding of Leeds and Grenville was defined to consist of the townships of South Elmsley, Wolford, Oxford and South Gower, and the villages of Smith's Falls, Kemptville and Merrickville.

The electoral district was abolished in 1903 when it was redistributed between Grenville and Leeds ridings.

== Electoral history ==
1867 Canadian federal election
Party	Candidate	Votes
Conservative	Francis Jones	923
Unknown	G.A. Montgomery	857

Result by municipality

Municipality	Jones	Montgomery	Total vote	Eligible voters
Elmsley Township	59	128	187	203
Kitley Township	220	223	443	593
Wolford Township	126	221	347	411
Merrickville	6	68	74	101
Oxford Township	362	150	512	658
Kemptville	75	2	77	118
South Gower Township	75	65	140	181
Total	923	857	1,789	2,265

1872 Canadian federal election
Party	Candidate	Votes
Conservative	Francis Jones	963
Unknown	G.A. Montgomery	771

1874 Canadian federal election
Party	Candidate	Votes
Liberal–Conservative	Charles Frederick Ferguson	918
Conservative	Francis Jones	785

On Mr. Ferguson being unseated, 10 November 1874:

By-election on 16 December 1874
Party	Candidate	Votes
Liberal–Conservative	Charles Frederick Ferguson	917
Unknown	John K. Weir	765

1878 Canadian federal election
Party	Candidate	Votes
Liberal–Conservative	Charles Frederick Ferguson	859
Conservative	Francis Jones	823

1882 Canadian federal election
Party	Candidate	Votes
Liberal–Conservative	Charles Frederick Ferguson	1,048
Liberal	Francis Theodore Frost	762

1887 Canadian federal election
Party	Candidate	Votes
Liberal–Conservative	Charles Frederick Ferguson	1,140
Conservative	Angus Buchanan	747
Liberal	George Eldon Kidd	291

1891 Canadian federal election
Party	Candidate	Votes
Liberal–Conservative	Charles Frederick Ferguson	1,311
Liberal	Francis Theodore Frost	1,165

1896 Canadian federal election
Party	Candidate	Votes
Liberal	Francis Theodore Frost	1,432
Conservative	John Reeve Lavell	1,423

1900 Canadian federal election
Party	Candidate	Votes
Conservative	John Reeve Lavell	1,590
Liberal	Francis Theodore Frost	1,267

== See also ==
- List of Canadian electoral districts
- Historical federal electoral districts of Canada
