= Charles Frederick Ferguson =

Canadian politician

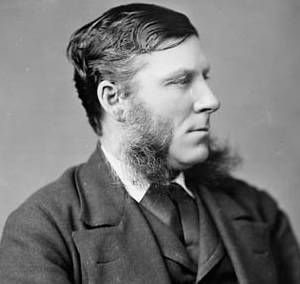
- Charles Frederick Ferguson

Member of Parliament for Leeds North and Grenville North
- In office 1874–1896
- Preceded by: Francis Jones
- Succeeded by: Francis Theodore Frost

Personal details
- Born: 20 July 1834 Kitley Township, Upper Canada
- Died: 29 September 1909 (aged 75) Kemptville, Ontario, Canada
- Party: Liberal-Conservative

Charles Frederick Ferguson (20 July 1834 – 29 September 1909) was an Ontario physician and political figure. He represented Leeds North and Grenville North in the House of Commons of Canada as a Liberal-Conservative member from 1874 to 1896.

The son of Robert Ferguson, he was born in Kitley Township, where his family had settled after immigrating from Ireland, and studied medicine at Queen's College, graduating in 1859. He set up practice in Kemptville. Ferguson married a sister of Robert Bell, who had represented Russell in the assembly for the Province of Canada. He died in Kemptville in 1909.

His son George Howard Ferguson later served as Premier of Ontario.

1874 Canadian federal election: Leeds North and Grenville North
Party	Candidate	Votes
Liberal–Conservative	Charles Frederick Ferguson	918
Conservative	Francis Jones	785

On Mr. Ferguson being unseated, 10 November 1874:

By-election on 16 December 1874
Party	Candidate	Votes
Liberal–Conservative	Charles Frederick Ferguson	917
Unknown	John K. Weir	765

1878 Canadian federal election: Leeds North and Grenville North
Party	Candidate	Votes
Liberal–Conservative	Charles Frederick Ferguson	859
Conservative	Francis Jones	823

1882 Canadian federal election: Leeds North and Grenville North
Party	Candidate	Votes
Liberal–Conservative	Charles Frederick Ferguson	1,048
Liberal	Francis Theodore Frost	762

1887 Canadian federal election: Leeds North and Grenville North
Party	Candidate	Votes
Liberal–Conservative	Charles Frederick Ferguson	1,140
Conservative	Angus Buchanan	747
Liberal	George Eldon Kidd	291

1891 Canadian federal election: Leeds North and Grenville North
Party	Candidate	Votes
Liberal–Conservative	Charles Frederick Ferguson	1,311
Liberal	Francis Theodore Frost	1,165
