= Elmcroft =

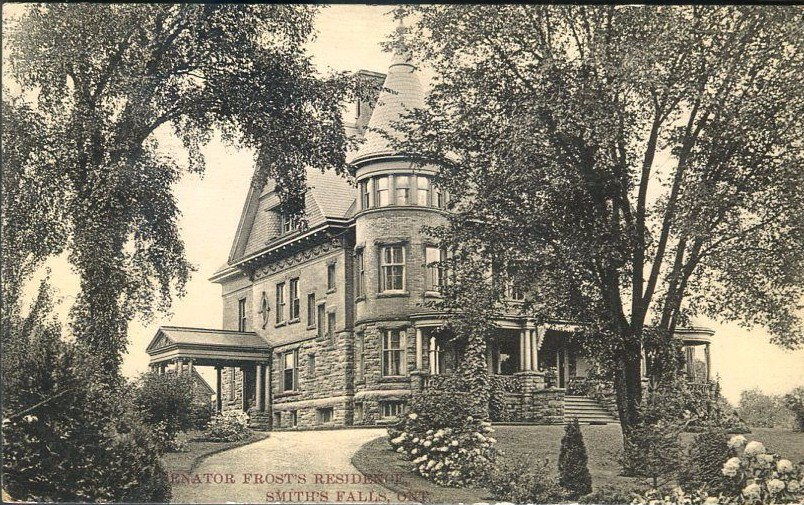
- 1907 postcard of Elmcroft
- Interactive map of the Elmcroft area
- Alternative names: The Frost Residence, Ketchum House

General information
- Type: Manor
- Architectural style: Queen Anne Revival
- Location: Smiths Falls, Ontario, Chambers Street
- Coordinates: 44°53′57″N 76°00′53″W
- Completed: 1895

Design and construction
- Main contractor: W. B. Taylor

Elmcroft is a 19th-century house in Smiths Falls, Ontario, Canada, built in 1895 by the town's mayor, Francis Theodore Frost, who also served as director of the local Frost & Wood foundry, as a Member of Parliament and as a senator. It is an example of Queen Anne Revival architecture.

== Architecture ==
The house, initially built by W. B. Taylor's construction firm, boasts two halls, a dining room, two staircases, a library and stables. The house was featured in The Canadian Architect and Builder in 1896. It used to also have a sweeping circular staircase in the front entrance and a rotunda which led to the ballroom, but these were removed by later renovations.

The Carriage House at 97 Chambers St is adjacent and was built for Frost's groundskeeper; 65 Chambers St was built for Frost's brother Edwin, and 69 Chambers St was built for a cousin of Frost's, who founded the Rideau Record newspaper in 1887.

== History ==
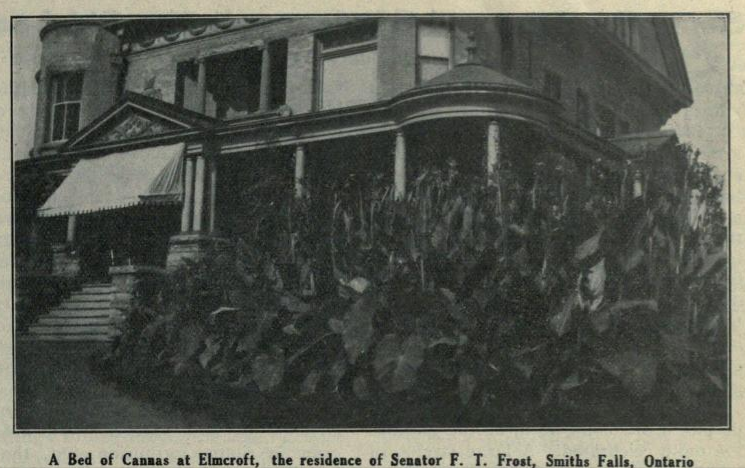
Elmcroft was featured in the March 1911 edition of The Canadian Horticulturalist, with a photo of its 27’ x 15’ canna beds.

The Canadian prime minister Wilfrid Laurier visited the house along with the future prime minister William Lyon Mackenzie King, taking tea with the Frost family. The Roper family of Alton, Illinois, were similarly noted in the media as guests at Elmcroft for a week in 1889.

The house was burgled in July 1907, when a thief carried off all the jewellery in the house. Upon Frost's unexpected death inside the house in 1916, his widow remained in the house for a decade before leaving it vacant.

In 1938, the vacant house was purchased by J. Clark Ketchum (alternately named J. A. Ketchum), the founder of Rideau Beverages, who paid $1 for the property and removed the top two storeys, citing water damage (though others claim it was to reduce property taxes).

== Grounds ==
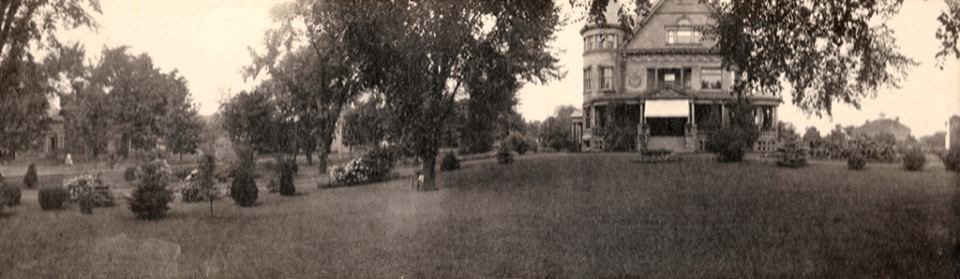
Panoramic of Elmcroft, taken sometime between 1890 and 1910.

The property initially ran to Elmsley Street, but a later owner sold off the property's southwest lawn, on which three other homes were subsequently built, and Chambers Street was built through the old property, obstructing the view of Elmcroft from passersby. In 1987, owner Bill Murphy stirred controversy by announcing his plans to build 10 garden homes at the foot of the property.

== Recent history ==
The property was purchased for $200,000 in 2008, and briefly operated as a 3-room bed and breakfast. In 2012, new owners converted Elmcroft back to a private residence. The house was issued a heritage certificate by the Municipal Heritage Committee and the neighbourhood was designated the Frost Mansion Row. The property has been featured as part of the Doors Open program in Lanark County.
