= Brockville station =

Railway station in Ontario, Canada

Brockville
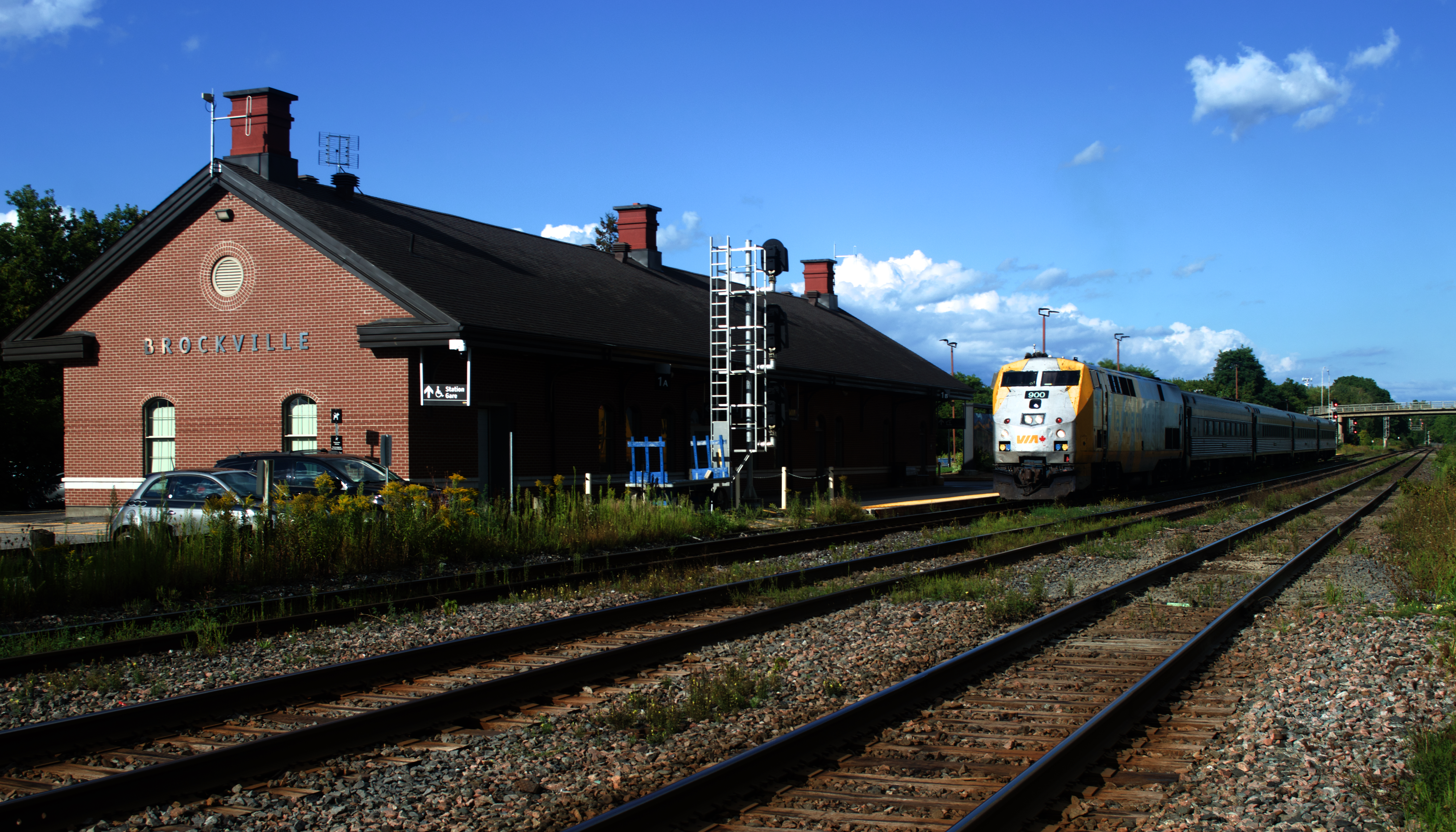
- Brockville Station in 2024

General information
- Location: 141 Perth Street; Brockville, Ontario; Canada
- Coordinates: 44°35′32″N 75°41′34″W
- Owner: Via Rail
- Platforms: 1

Construction
- Platform levels: 1
- Parking: Yes
- Cycle facilities: Yes
- Accessible: yes

Other information
- Status: Staffed 9:15 a.m. to 5:30 p.m.

History
- Opened: 1872
- Rebuilt: 2014

Services
Preceding station	Via Rail	Following station
Gananoque toward Toronto	Toronto–Ottawa	Smiths Falls toward Ottawa
Kingston toward Toronto	Toronto–Montreal	Cornwall toward Montreal
Former services
Preceding station	Canadian National Railway	Following station
Lyn Junction toward Sarnia	Grand Trunk Railway; Main Line	Maitland toward Montreal
Lyn Junction toward Westport	Westport – Brockville	Terminus
Location
- Location within Southern Ontario Location within Ontario Location within Canada

The Brockville railway station in Brockville, Ontario, Canada is served by Via Rail trains running from Toronto to Ottawa and Montreal. It is a staffed railway station, with ticket sales, outdoor parking, telephones, washrooms, and wheelchair access to the platform and trains.

== History ==
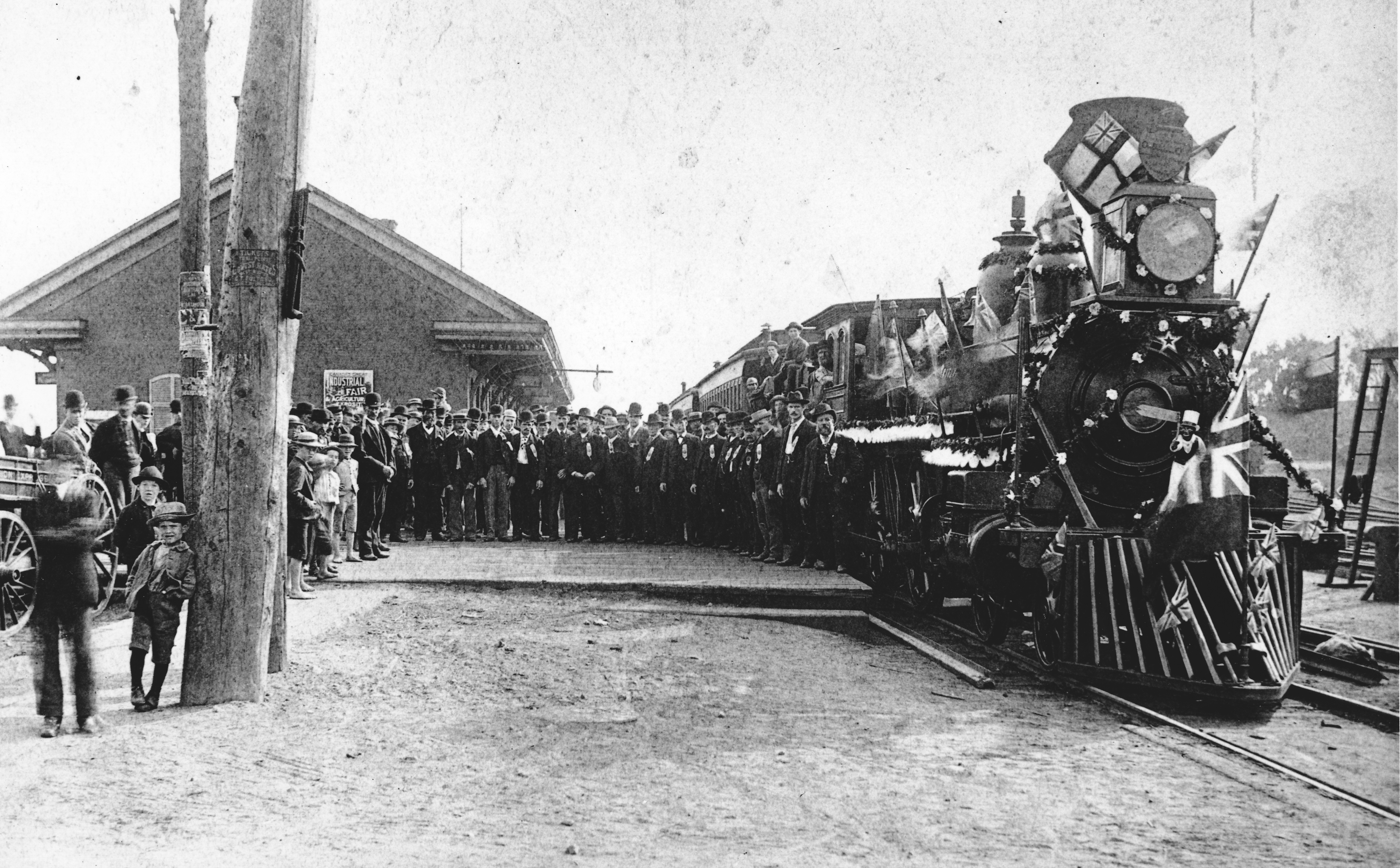
Old photo of the original station (early 20th century)

Via Rail announced in November 2009 that it would replace the historic 1872 Brockville station with a new $7-million facility. The initial proposal was scaled back; on November 10, 2010, Via Rail unveiled a second proposed design for a new station building. The 2,400-square-foot (220 m^{2}) building was to cost $4.5 million CDN and would have been wheelchair accessible, with space to accommodate expanded track lines.

Once the proposed development was to have been completed, the old railway station building was planned to be demolished; that move met with local opposition. As passenger volumes remain low, Via returned to the drawing board and proposed a million-dollar renovation of the existing station with a new roof, exterior brick, lighting, doors, and windows. An automatic door and accessibility improvements would be added for people with disabilities, and a building adjacent to the station would be demolished and replaced with a passenger shelter. According to Brockville mayor David Henderson, "It's clearly something that set off some alarm bells in the local community, because we do have a very historical aspect to this old city. What was good is that Via Rail, and the people at Via Rail, they responded." The renovations were completed in July 2015.

== Services ==
As of July 2025, Brockville station is served by 5 to 7 trains per day to Ottawa, two trains per day to Montreal and 7 to 9 trains per day to Toronto.

The station features an indoor waiting area open prior to all train departures, and a staffed ticket counter during the day.
