= Smiths Falls Police Service =

Smiths Falls Police Service Service Policier de Smiths Falls
- The badge worn by Smiths Falls Police officers.
- Abbreviation: SFPS
- Motto: "Community First"

Agency overview
- Formed: February 9, 1881 (142 years ago)
- Annual budget: $5,226,780 CAD (2023)

Jurisdictional structure
- Operations jurisdiction: Smiths Falls
- Area: 9.66 square kilometres (3.73 sq mi)
- Population: 9,254 (2021 Census)
- Legal jurisdiction: Municipal
- Governing body: Smiths Falls Police Board
- General nature: Local civilian police

Operational structure
- Headquarters: 7 Hershey Drive, Smiths Falls, ON.
- Sworn Officers: 30 Police officers
- Civilian Employees: 9
- Elected officer responsible: Michael Kerzner, Minister of the Solicitor General
- Agency executive: Jody Empey, Chief of Police

Facilities
- Stations: 1 (Headquarters)
- Service Vehicles: 9

The Smiths Falls Police is the municipal police service for the city of Smiths Falls, Ontario. It was established by the Smiths Falls Village Council on February 9, 1881. Prior to then, only part time constables were responsible for the safety of the town. Today, the Smiths Falls Police is made up of just under 40 members serving an area of 9.66 square kilometers and 9,254 (2021 Census) people.

== History ==
The history of the Smiths Falls Police Service (SFPS) began over 150 years ago when John B. Drew was appointed as a part time constable in the Smiths Falls Village. On February 9, 1881 Chief Drew was hired as the first chief of police thereby birthing the SFPS. For the next 29 years, the police service was run by one person at the time, the chief of police. It wasn't until 1910 that a second full time officer was on-boarded. This new, 2 man team continued throughout the 1920s. The SFPS growth was very slow due to the Smiths Falls Village Council refusing to increase the manpower. By the late 1940s, the force was still under 10 officers.

In 1981 a civilian dispatcher team was introduced into the service. With a growing team, and aging infrastructure, a new police station was built in 1984. By 1990 the service had reached 17 officers and 6 civilian employees. Which quickly grew to 25 officers and 10 civilian employees by the mid 2010s.

As of the end of 2022, the Smiths Falls Police Service is still constituted of 25 officers and 10 civilian employees.

== Fleet ==
The Smiths Falls Police Service fleet consists of nine vehicles. It includes five Ford Interceptor Utility (a police ready variant of the Ford Explorer), two Dodge Charger, a Chevrolet Tahoe, and a Dodge Durango. Of the nine vehicles currently in service, three are unmarked cruisers. The SFPS uses the Dodge Durango for their Criminal Investigations Bureau branch, one vehicle is primarily used for community services, and the other seven vehicles are used for general patrol.

== Former chiefs ==
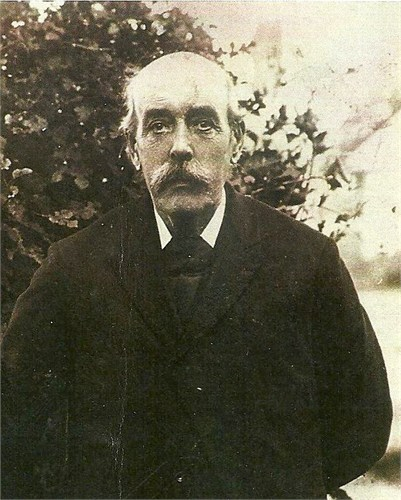
- Chief John B. Drew, was the first chief of police of the Smiths Falls Police Service, serving the community from the 1860s to 1882.
  1881–1882: John B. Drew (First Chief)
- 1882–1883: William McGillivray
- 1883–1884: James Gilroy
- 1884–1887: Robert Reyolds
- 1888–1902: Robert McGowan
- 1890–1890: Alexander Vernon (only served 3 months)
- 1902–1906: Miner W. Sweet
- 1906–1910: Charles Edwards
- 1911–1912: William Sweet
- 1912–1914: George Phillips
- 1914–1915: George Mitchell
- 1915–1933: George Phillips
- 1933–1936: Graham Bromley
- 1937-1943: John Lees
- 1944–1947: George Foss
- 1947–1975: Reginal Wride (with the longest service in SFPS history, Wride is also attributed to having convinced the Hershey team to build a factory in Smiths Falls, significantly boosting their economy for over 4 decades)
- 1975–1990: William Stocker
- 1990–2012: Larry Hardy
- 2012–2016: Robert Dowdall
- 2016–2023: Mark MacGillivray
- 2024–Present: Jodi Empey (Acting since Dec. 2023: sworn in on Monday, July 8th, 2024)

== Ranks and insignia ==
The rank insignia worn by the Smiths Falls Police is similar to the one used in other police services throughout Canada.

Rank	Commanding officers		Senior officers		Police officers					
Rank	Chief of police	Deputy chief of police	Superintendent	Inspector	Staff sergeant	Sergeant	First class constable	Second class constable	Third class constable	Fourth class constable
Insignia (slip-on)										
Insignia (shoulder board)					Shoulder boards not used for these ranks					
