= Thousand Islands Playhouse =

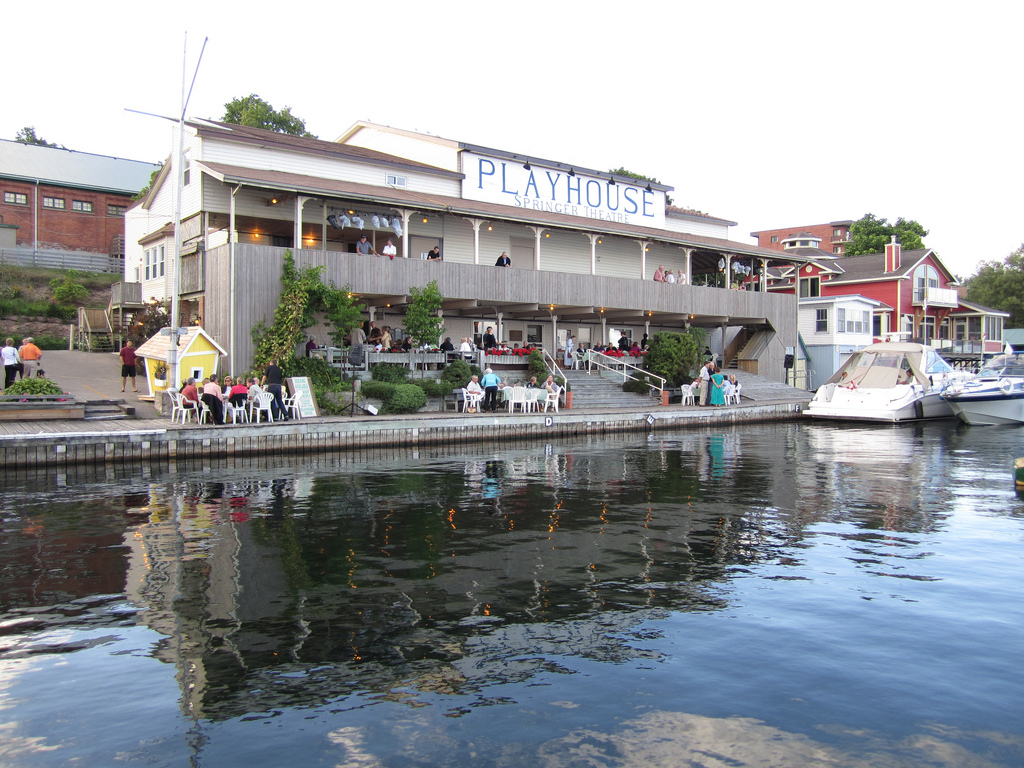
- The Springer Theatre
- Location: Gananoque, Ontario, Canada
- Founded: 1982
- Founded by: Greg Wanless, Timm Hughes, Joan Gardiner, Mo Bock, Kathryn Mackay
- Artistic director: Brett Christopher (Managing)
- Festival date: May–November
- Website: 1000islandsplayhouse.com

The Thousand Islands Playhouse is a summer theatre company located in Gananoque, Ontario, Canada.

It was founded in 1982 by Greg Wanless and a group of local actors and graduates from Queen's University including Timm Hughes, Joan Gardiner, Mo Bock, and Kathryn Mackay. Artistic Director Wanless and Assistant Artistic Director Mackay retired at the end of the 2012 season. Since 2016, the company has been led by Managing Artistic Director Brett Christopher.

Thousand Islands Playhouse operates two theatres, the former Gananoque Canoe Club building as the 348-seat Springer Theatre in which musicals and larger plays are performed, and a black-box theatre, the 140-seat Firehall Theatre in which smaller, experimental plays are produced.

The Thousand Islands Playhouse's programming also a series of educational opportunities: camps, workshops, and the Young Company program that sees 25 local high school students attending school full time at the theatre. The company has also recently renovated a new premier production facility, a 20,000 sq ft building that houses all production departments (carpentry, scenic painting, props, wardrobe, as well as the rehearsal halls.

== Playwrights’ Unit ==
The Playwrights’ Unit is a year-long residency program to nurture promising playwrights. The selected writers create new plays while having the Playhouse audience and resources of both the Springer Theatre and Firehall Theatre in mind. During the month of December, the Playhouse holds full day workshops during the PlayReading series; a series of free-public reading on the playwrights’ work.

== Young Company ==
Beginning in mid-April until the end of June, The Young Company introduces children to the magic of theatre with a travelling show, incorporating reading, singing, storytelling and dance. The Young Company has been bringing high-calibre acting to the Thousand Islands Playhouse since 1997, performing their shows across Eastern Ontario to school-aged children, as well as in parks, libraries, and at special events. They employ a troupe of young professionals providing them with professionally led-workshops and master classes. The graduates have gone on to take well-earned places in the profession.

== Production Facility ==
In May 2014, the Thousand Islands Playhouse began to renovate a 20,000 square foot warehouse into Eastern Ontario’s premier production facility. The facility allows plenty of room to build and store many things such as sets, costumes, props and a space for the actors to rehearse plays and musicals. This project was incorporated with a sprung floor, sound proofed rooms and rack systems for the Playhouse’s inventory of props and costumes that finished on March 31, 2015.
