= Smiths Falls =

- Town (single-tier)
- Town of Smiths Falls
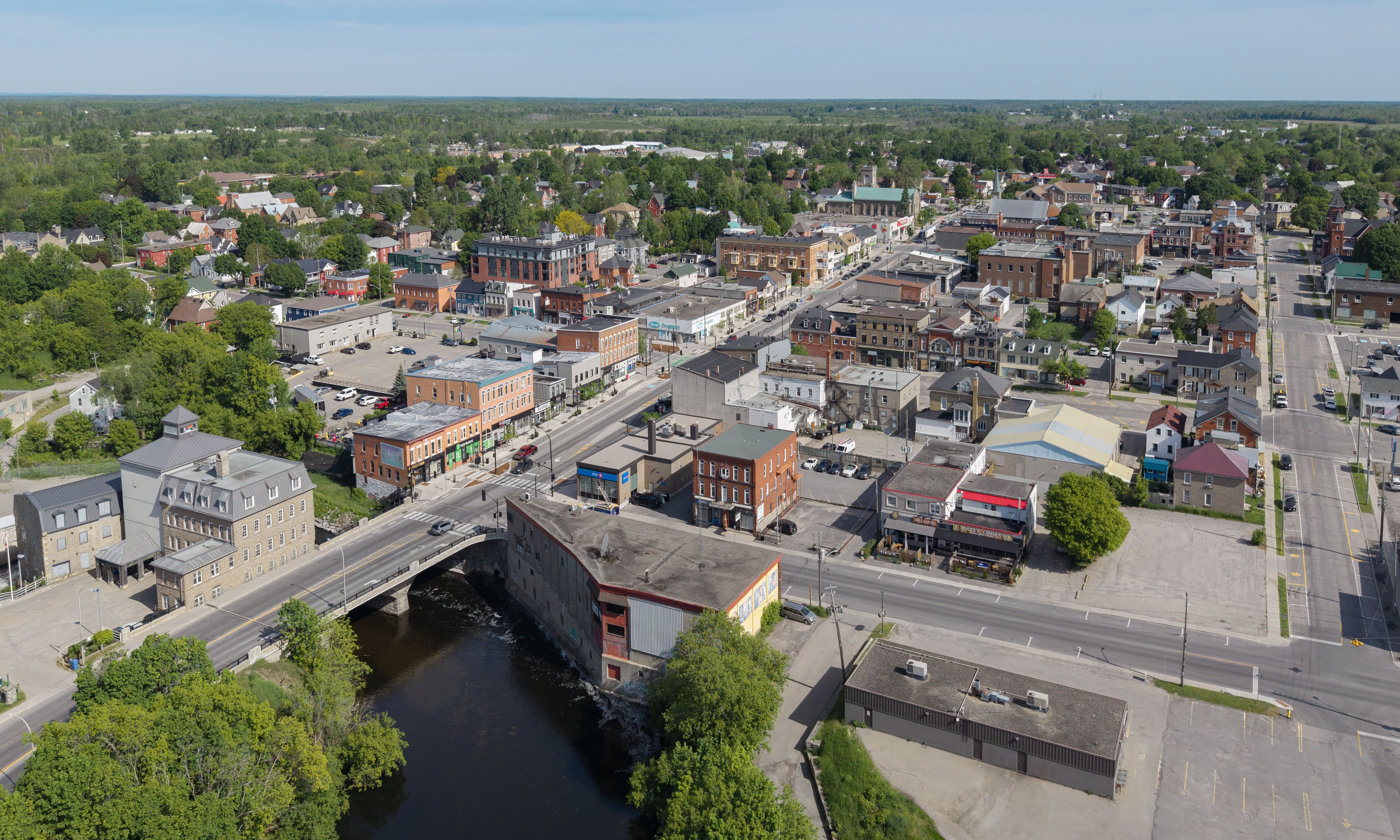

- Logo
- Motto: Rise at the Falls
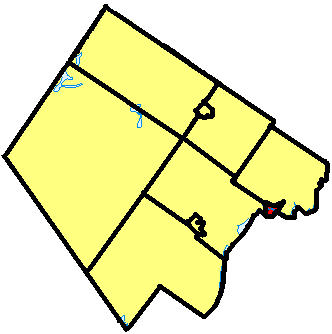
- Smiths Falls within Lanark County

- Location within Southern Ontario
- Coordinates: 44°54′N 76°01′W
- Country: Canada
- Province: Ontario
- County: Lanark
- Incorporated: 1854 (as village)

Government
  - Mayor: Shawn Pankow
  - Federal riding: Lanark—Frontenac—Kingston
  - Prov. riding: Lanark—Frontenac—Kingston

Area
  - Land: 9.66 km^{2} (3.73 sq mi)

Population (2021)
  - Total: 9,254
  - Density: 958.1/km^{2} (2,481/sq mi)
- Time zone: UTC−5 (EST)
  - Summer (DST): UTC−4 (EDT)
- Postal code FSA: K7A
- Area code: 613
- Website: www.smithsfalls.ca

Smiths Falls is a town in Eastern Ontario, Canada, 78 kilometres (48 mi) southwest of Ottawa. As of the 2021 census it has a population of 9,254. It is in the Census division for Lanark County, but is administratively separated from the county. The Rideau Canal waterway passes through the town, with four separate locks in three locations and a combined lift of over 15 metres (49.2 ft).

The town's name was previously spelled Smith's Falls, and the spelling Smith Falls has been used, but "Smiths Falls" is the official correct form.

== History ==
=== Early history and naming ===
Smiths Falls was incorporated first as a village in 1854, and then as a town in 1882.

It is named after Thomas Smyth, an Irish born United Empire Loyalist (abt. 1758-1832) who in 1786 was granted 1.6 square kilometres (400 acres) in what is present-day Smiths Falls. He served as Lieutenant in Sir John Johnson’s King's Royal Regiment of New York and later as Major in the Leeds Militia. The Heritage House Museum (c. 1862), also known as the Ward House, was designated under the Ontario Heritage Act in 1977.

In about 1920, the town council voted to change the name from Smith's Falls to Smiths Falls, and this spelling entered general use, but in 1967 the Ontario Municipal Board stated that it was not official and the town's legal documents must use the spelling Smith's Falls found in the 1882 order-in-council of incorporation. The town then applied to the provincial government for an official change to Smiths Falls, and in 1968 the legislature granted the change by private bill.

=== Building of the Rideau Canal ===
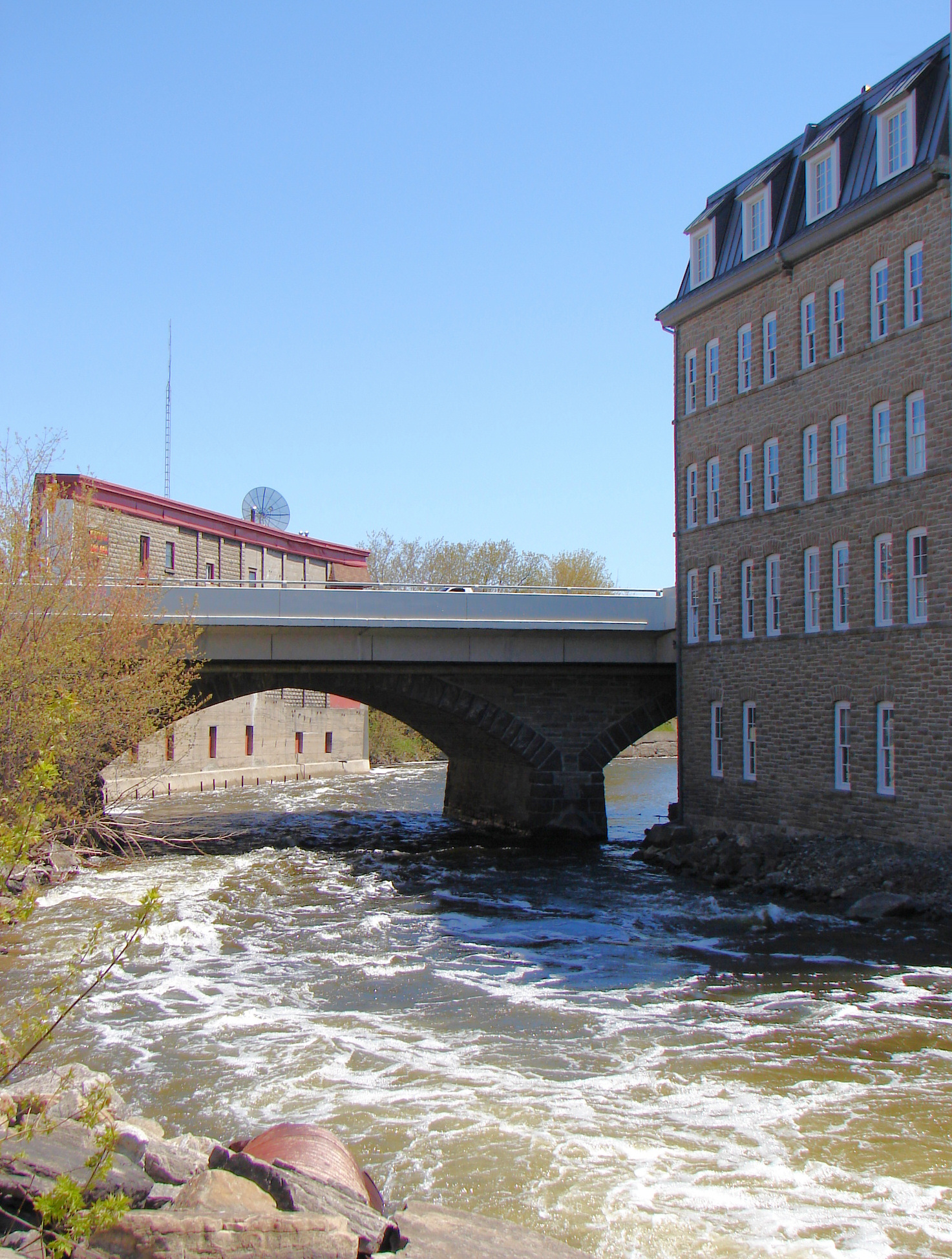
Rideau River in Smiths Falls

At the time of construction of the Rideau Canal a small settlement had been established around a mill operated by Abel Russell Ward, who had bought Smyth's land. Colonel By ordered the removal of Ward's mill to make way for the canal. He settled with Ward for £1,500, one of the largest claims made by mill owners on the canal.

The disruption of industry caused by the building of the canal was only temporary, and Smiths Falls grew rapidly following construction. An article in Smith's Gazetteer in 1846 described the town as a "flourishing little village pleasantly situated on the Rideau River and on the Canal, twenty-three kilometres (14 mi) from Perth. It contains about 700 inhabitants. There are fifty dwellings, two grist mills (one with four run of stones), two sawmills, one carding and fulling mill, seven stores, six groceries, one axe factory, six blacksmiths, two wheelwrights, one cabinet maker, one chair-maker, three carpenters, one gunsmith, eleven shoemakers, seven tailors, one tinsmith and two taverns."

A 11-metre (36 ft) drop in less than 0.40 kilometres (1/4 mi) posed an obstacle to navigation at Smiths Falls. A natural depression to the south of the river was used to create a flight of three locks, known as Combined Lockstation today. The natural course of the river was dammed to create a basin upstream of the locks. At the upper end of the basin a fourth (detached) lock was constructed.

One point six kilometres (1 mi) below the Combined Lockstation is a flight of two locks called the Old Slys Lockstation. This station is named for the original settler at this location, William Sly. A dam and waste weir control water levels upstream of the locks.

Defensible lockmasters' houses were built at all three stations in Smiths Falls. The house at Old Slys was built in 1838 and the houses at Combined and Detached around 1842. Only the house at Combined has a second storey, which was added late in the 19th century. The defensible lockmaster's house at Detached Lockstation was torn down in 1894.

=== Entry of the railways ===
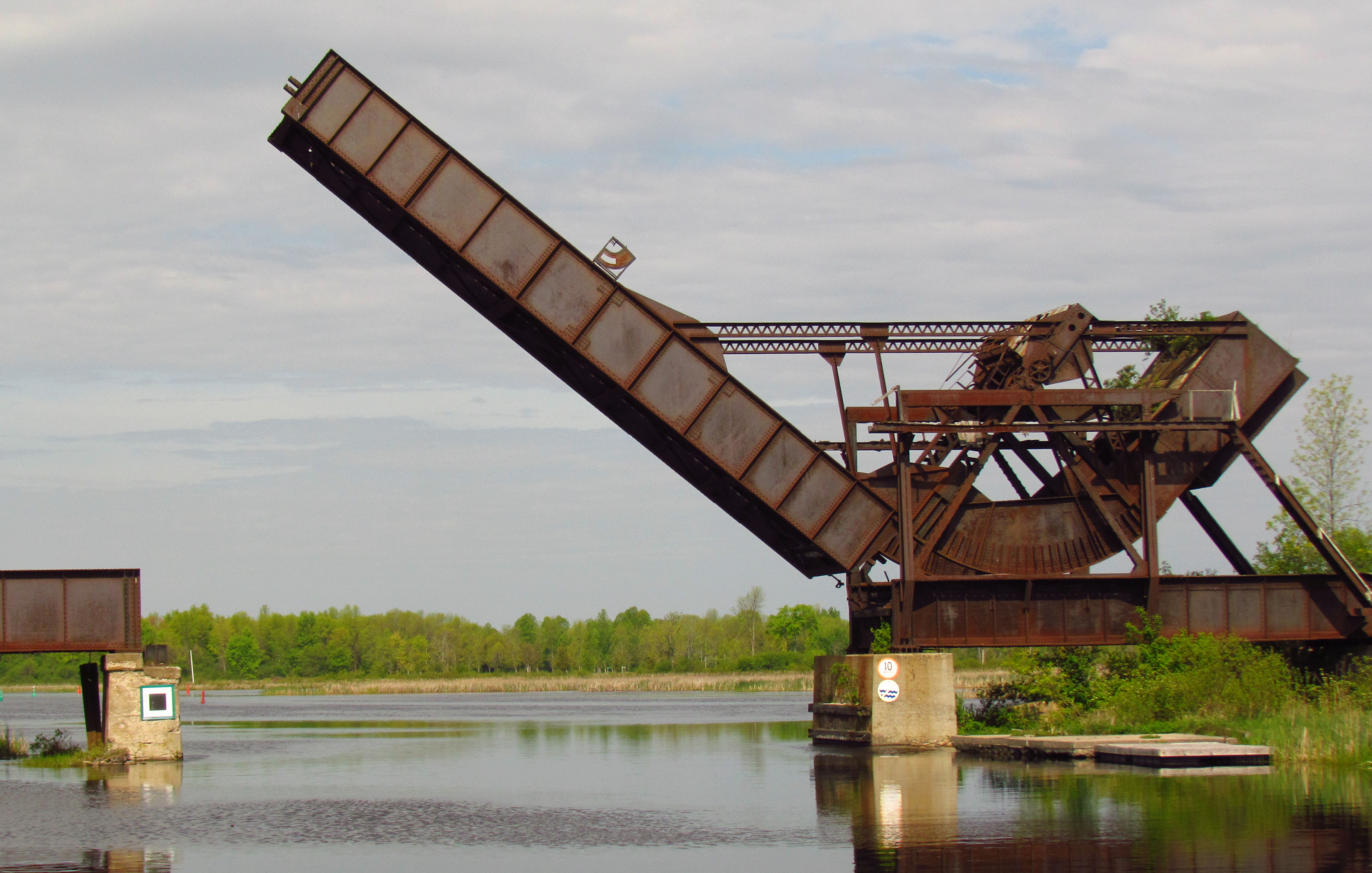
Bascule bridge, a Canadian National Historic Site

In the 1850s the major railway companies were looking to build main trunk lines linking Toronto, Kingston and Montreal. The two major companies at the time, the Canadian Pacific Railway and the Grand Trunk Railway, were competing for the easiest routes to lay track. At one point a fledgling third national railway, the Canadian Northern Railway (CNoR), was also trying to squeeze itself into the busy Montréal-Ottawa-Toronto corridor.

For a number of geographical reasons, and also due to the proximity of the Rideau Canal, the town of Smiths Falls became a major focal point for both the CPR and the CNoR. Each used a mix of existing regional rail lines and new construction to build their networks. CP purchased the 1859-era Brockville and Ottawa Railway, a line from Brockville-Smiths Falls-Sand Point/Arnprior with a branch Smiths Falls-Perth (the latter joining CP's Ontario and Quebec Railway line to Toronto). CNoR built a 1914-era main line from Ottawa-Smiths Falls-Sydenham (to join an existing Bay of Quinte Railway line extending westward via Napanee-Deseronto). By 1887, the CPR had extended its Toronto-Smiths Falls mainline to reach Montréal; in 1924, 1600 CPR workers were employed in Smiths Falls.

This gave the town direct rail lines in half a dozen directions (towards Toronto, Ottawa, Montréal, Brockville, Napanee and Arnprior) on two different rail companies.

During World War II, Axis prisoners of war (POWs) were transported to Canadian POW camps via the railway. It was near Smiths Falls that German soldier Oberleutnant Franz von Werra jumped from a POW train and escaped to the United States, eventually reaching his homeland. Von Werra was, reputedly, the only escaped Axis POW to successfully return home during the war and his story was told in the book and film entitled The One That Got Away. The North American première of the film occurred on Thursday, 6 March 1958 at the Soper Theatre in Smiths Falls.

Both the Canadian Pacific and the Canadian Northern (later part of Canadian National) had established stations in the town, however, with the creation of Via Rail, the CN station was abandoned and all passenger traffic routed through the CPR station until a new Smiths Falls railway station opened in 2010. The CN station has been renovated and is now home to the Railway Museum of Eastern Ontario. The railway station, along with the nearby railway bascule bridge, comprise the town's two National Historic Sites of Canada. The Cataraqui Trail now follows the former CN railbed southwest from Smiths Falls, starting from a parking lot at the end of Ferrara Drive.

== Demographics ==
In the 2021 Census of Population conducted by Statistics Canada, Smiths Falls had a population of 9,254 living in 4,311 of its 4,523 total private dwellings, a change of 5.4% from its 2016 population of 8,780. With a land area of 9.66 km^{2} (3.73 sq mi), it had a population density of 958.0/km^{2} (2,481.1/sq mi) in 2021.

Canada census – Smiths Falls community profile

	2021	2016	2011
Population	9,254 (+5.4% from 2016)	8,780 (-2.2% from 2011)	8,978 (+2.0% from 2006)
Land area	9.66 km^{2} (3.73 sq mi)	9.66 km^{2} (3.73 sq mi)	9.61 km^{2} (3.71 sq mi)
Population density	958.1/km^{2} (2,481/sq mi)	909.1/km^{2} (2,355/sq mi)	934.6/km^{2} (2,421/sq mi)
Median age	47.2 (M: 44.4, F: 50.0)	48.1 (M: 45.9, F: 49.8)
Private dwellings	4,523 (total) 4,311 (occupied)	4,387 (total)	4,383 (total)
Median household income	$61,200

References: 2021 2016 2011

Historical census populations – Smiths Falls

Year	Pop.	±%
1871	1,150	—
1881	2,087	+81.5%
1891	3,864	+85.1%
1901	5,155	+33.4%
1911	6,370	+23.6%
1921	6,790	+6.6%

Year	Pop.	±%
1931	7,108	+4.7%
1941	7,088	−0.3%
1951	8,441	+19.1%
1961	9,603	+13.8%
1971	9,585	−0.2%
1981	8,831	−7.9%

Year	Pop.	±%
1991	9,396	+6.4%
2001	9,140	−2.7%
2006	8,777	−4.0%
2011	8,978	+2.3%
2016	8,780	−2.2%
2021	9,254	+5.4%

2006 population adjusted to 2011 boundaries is 9,163
Source: Statistics Canada

== Economy ==
The town is on the Rideau Canal system for recreational boating, and is served by the Smiths Falls-Montague Airport (Russ Beach) for general aviation. It is also a major railway junction point, and its station receives regular passenger service to Ottawa and Toronto from Via Rail.

Several manufacturers were based in Smiths Falls, perhaps the best-known being the Canadian operation of The Hershey Company (opened in 1963), which closed in December 2008. Hershey announced they would instead open a factory in Mexico, where they could obtain cheaper labour. In late 2006, the plant was temporarily closed due to a case of possible salmonella contamination. Other former large manufacturers include RCA Victor (closed circa 1980), Frost and Wood / Cockshutt and Stanley Tools (2008). The closure of the Rideau Regional hospital site in March 2009 resulted in a further loss of jobs from the community. However, the 1.4-square-kilometre (350-acre) site was purchased by a local developer (who made an unsuccessful bid for mayor in the 2018 election) and renamed the Gallipeau Centre. It is a mixed use property with residential and recreational uses including condominiums, a recreational facility, swimming pool and theatre. In 2014, the former Hershey facility was purchased by medical marijuana company Tweed Marijuana Inc, now known as publicly traded company Canopy Growth Corporation (TSE:WEED). The town has been cited as the "Pot Capital of Canada". Over 750 jobs had been created by Canopy Growth which had revitalized the town's economy after the departure of the Hershey factory and the closure of Rideau Regional Centre. Investment by Constellation Brands of $5B in Canopy Growth Corporation had seemingly helped further secure the positive economic potential for Smiths Falls. In 2023, Canopy announced the closure of their Smiths Falls Headquarters alongside the lay off of 800 workers. Canopy had purchased the site of the closed Shorewood Packaging building to construct a facility for bottling cannabis infused beverages in 2018. Canopy had previously been credited for saving the town but has since reduced operations exclusively to the bottling facility following the mass lay off. Canopy Growth resold the former Hershey plant back to Hershey in 2023 to reduce its debt after announcing $266.7M losses and the lay-off of 800 workers.

Despite the policing of Smiths Falls being conducted by the Smiths Falls Police Service, the Ontario Provincial Police operates one facility, named the Eastern Regional Headquarters, formerly operating a communications centre. The Communications Centre closed on July 18, 2022 after Ontario Provincial Police announced the cessation of operations. There are presently no plans to close the Eastern Regional Headquarters.

== Local government ==
The town's council includes a mayor and six councillors. The members of council elected as of the 2022 municipal election are:

- Mayor: Shawn Pankow
- Councillors:
  - Jay Brennan
  - Jennifer Miller
  - Peter McKenna
  - Chris McGuire
  - Stephen Robinson
  - Dawn Quinn

== Sports and recreation ==
In 1906, a hockey team from Smiths Falls launched an unsuccessful challenge to win the Stanley Cup. Smiths Falls was home to a professional baseball team, the Smiths Falls Beavers, for one season in 1937. The team was a part of the Canadian–American League.

The town is currently home to the Junior A hockey team Smiths Falls Bears, who play in the Central Canada Hockey League. Smiths Falls is also home to the Settlers organization which is a member of the Canadian Premier Junior Hockey League (CPJHL), which operates throughout Ontario and Western Quebec.

There are many opportunities for minor and adult league sports including baseball, volleyball, basketball, soccer, ball hockey and hockey (for men and women). Lower Reach, located next to Rideau River, is home to baseball diamonds, soccer fields, play structures and a splash pad.

The Rideau Trail passes through Smiths Falls.

== Hospitals ==
General hospital facilities and services are provided by the Perth and Smiths Falls District Hospital, with a site on Cornelia Street. Also located in Smiths Falls was the Rideau Regional Centre, which provided a residential program for mentally challenged and disabled persons from 1951 until its closure in March 2009.

== Education ==
Public education in the town is managed by the Upper Canada District School Board, while Catholic education is under the care of the Catholic District School Board of Eastern Ontario. Each operates several elementary schools and one secondary school as listed below. Students who reside in the Smiths Falls area and wish to attend Catholic high school are bussed to Perth to St. John's Catholic High School.

=== Catholic schools ===
- St. Francis de Sales Catholic Elementary School (French Immersion offered)
- St. Luke Catholic High School
- St. James Catholic education centre

=== Public schools ===
- Duncan J. Schoular Public School
- Chimo Elementary School
- Smiths Falls District Collegiate Institute
- T.J Leger Alternative School

== Local media ==
=== Newspapers ===
- The Record-News – weekly newspaper

Digital local news:

- Record News – insideottawavalley.com
- Hometown News – hometownnews.ca

=== Radio stations ===
- FM 92.3 – CJET-FM, classic hits
- FM 101.1 – CKBY-FM, country music

== Notable people ==
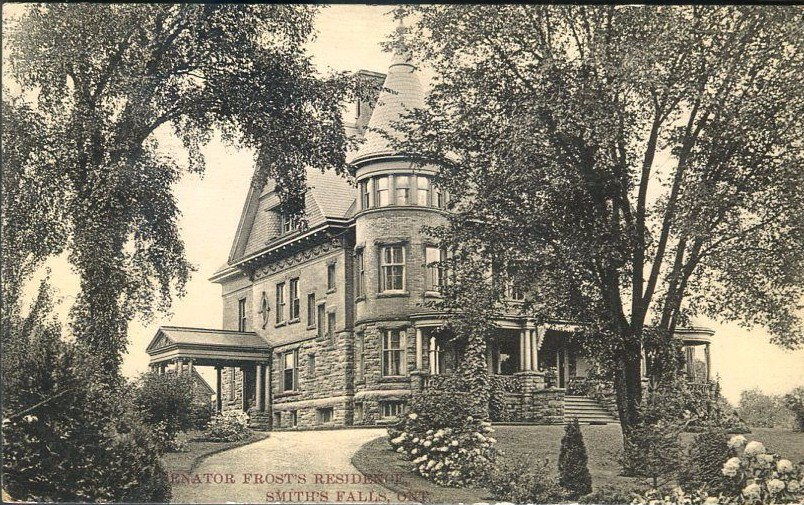
Elmcroft, the house Francis T. Frost built in Smiths Falls in 1895

- Oliver R. Avison, doctor, pharmacist and missionary
- Nicholas Bawlf, grain merchant
- Terry Carkner, former NHL player
- Francis Theodore Frost, businessman and politician
- E. A. Gilroy, Canadian Amateur Hockey Association president
- Brooke Henderson, professional golfer
- Todd Lynn, fashion designer
- Gary McAdam, former NHL player
- Don McKenney, former NHL player
- Richard Gardiner Willis, Manitoba politician
