= Francis Jones (Canadian politician) =

Canadian politician

Francis Jones (November 1, 1815 – August 2, 1887) was an Ontario civil engineer, provincial land surveyor and political figure. He represented Leeds North and Grenville North in the House of Commons of Canada as a Conservative member from 1867 to 1874.

He was born in Ballykilleen, County Carlow, Ireland in 1815, the son of Edward Jones and Rowanna Sparling. He was an unsuccessful candidate for a seat in the Legislative Assembly of the Province of Canada in 1854 before being elected for North Leeds and Grenville in 1861 and 1863. He was elected again following Confederation and served until he was defeated in 1874. Jones ran unsuccessfully for reelection again in 1878. He lived in Kemptville and died there at the age of 71. Jones never married.

1867 Canadian federal election: Leeds North and Grenville North
Party	Candidate	Votes
Conservative	Francis Jones	923
Unknown	G.A. Montgomery	857

1872 Canadian federal election: Leeds North and Grenville North
Party	Candidate	Votes
Conservative	Francis Jones	963
Unknown	G.A. Montgomery	771

1874 Canadian federal election: Leeds North and Grenville North
Party	Candidate	Votes
Liberal–Conservative	Charles Frederick Ferguson	918
Conservative	Francis Jones	785
