= Gananoque River =

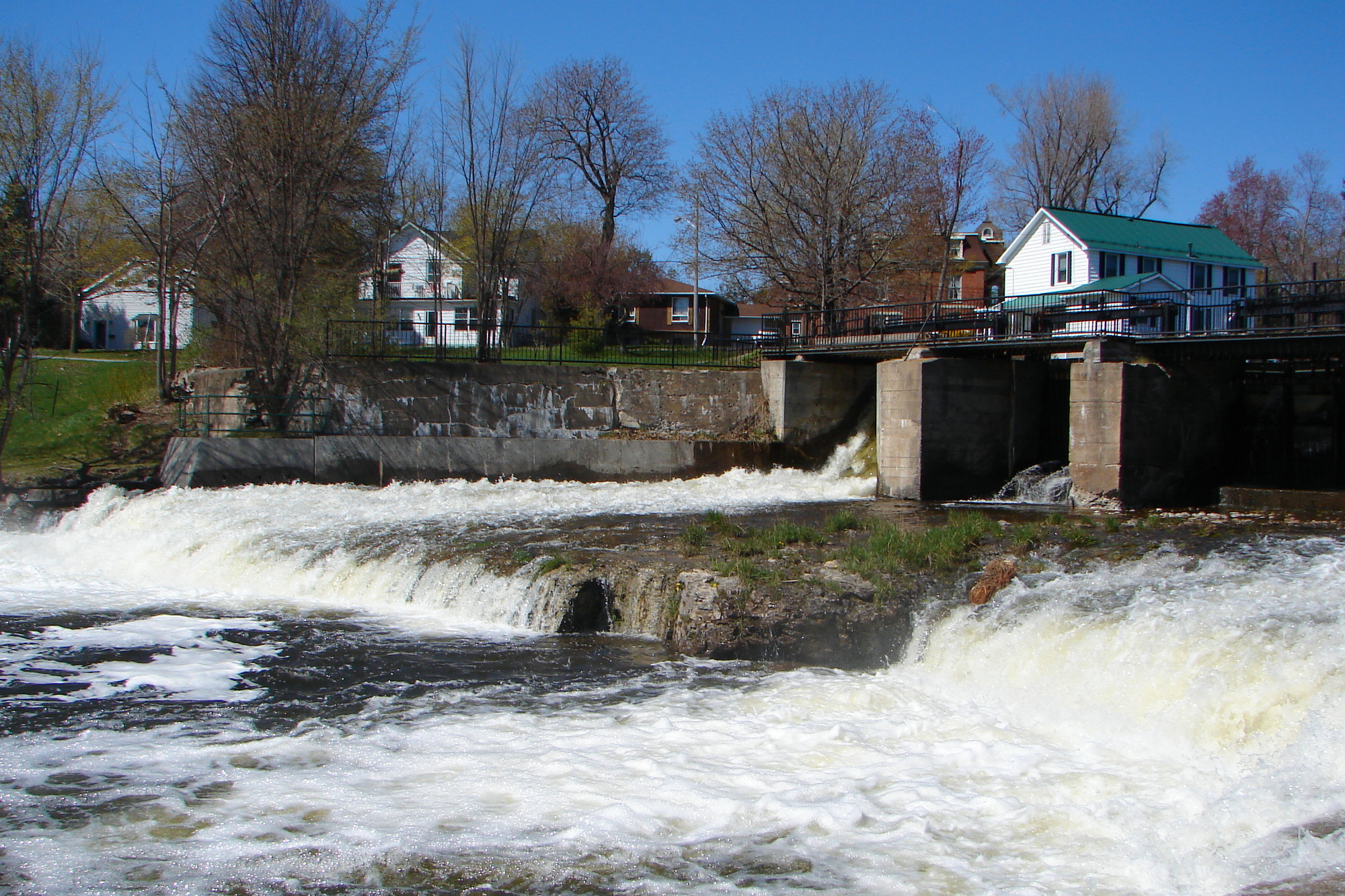
- Gananoque River passing through the dam at Gananoque

- Location of the mouth of the Gananoque River in southern Ontario

Location
- Country: Canada
- Province: Ontario
- Region: Eastern Ontario
- County: Leeds and Grenville United Counties

Physical characteristics
- Source: Gananoque Lake
  - location: Leeds and the Thousand Islands
  - coordinates: 44°26′16″N 76°08′55″W
  - elevation: 82 m (269 ft)
- Mouth: Saint Lawrence River
  - location: Gananoque
  - coordinates: 44°19′32″N 76°09′34″W
  - elevation: 78 m (256 ft)

Basin features
- River system: Atlantic Ocean drainage basin

The Gananoque River is a river in Leeds and Grenville United Counties in Eastern Ontario, Canada. The river is in the Atlantic Ocean drainage basin and is a left tributary of the Saint Lawrence River.

The name "Gananoque" has been spelled many different ways over the years and so has been assigned several different interpretations, including "place of health" or "meeting place".

The Gananoque River Waterways Association was founded in 1963 to include "...property owners, resort operators, fishermen, farmers, trappers and all other interested parties..." for the purpose of getting together to "Protect wild life, arrange for equitable water levels, facilitate navigation, maintain health standards through the purity of the water [and] confer with officials in regard to definite arrangements for maintaining and improving the waterway for everyone's use."

== Course and watershed ==
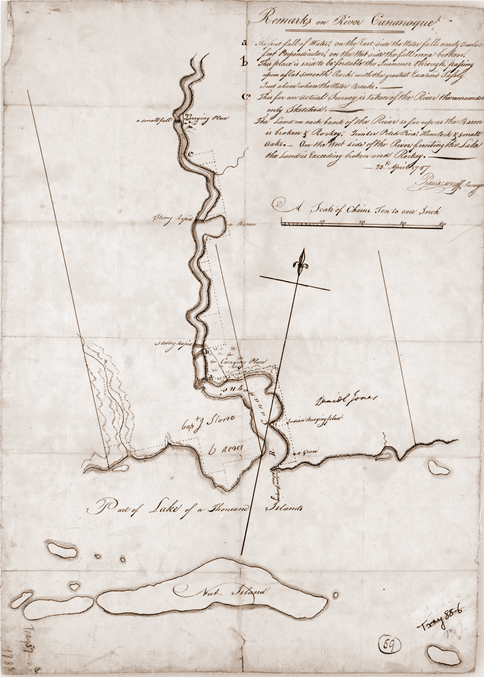
Surveryor's map of the Gananoque River, 1787

The Gananoque River begins at Gananoque Lake in incorporated Leeds and the Thousand Islands township. It flows south, passes through the community of Marble Rock, then turns southwest and reaches the community of Maple Grove. It heads again south, takes in the right tributary Mud Creek, passes under Ontario Highway 401, and enters the town of Gananoque. It then flows over the concrete dam for the Gananoque Generating Station, in service since 1939, and empties into the Saint Lawrence River where that river is part of the Thousand Islands region.

Originally the Gananoque watershed included waters south of the present day Rideau River / Cataraqui River watershed divide near Newboro, Ontario. Water from present day upper Cataraqui watershed lakes such as Birch, Canoe, Buck, Devil, Newboro, Clear, Indian, Benson, Opinicon and Sand flowed through the Jones Falls rapids to the White Fish River. That river flowed into Lower Beverley Lake and from there to the Gananoque River. The original native canoe route from the Ottawa River, via the Rideau River, went to the White Fish River and from there to the St. Lawrence River at Gananoque. This was due to the fact that a direct waterway connection to the Cataraqui River did not exist at that time.

This started to change c.1803 when brothers Lemuel and Carey Haskins built a timber dam and sawmill at White Fish Falls, near today's Morton, Ontario. Their dam backed up the water from the White Fish River, overflowing the Cranberry Flood Plain and sending it to the Cataraqui River at the Round Tail (just north of today's Upper Brewers Locks). By 1816 (perhaps as early as 1805-1807), the Haskins built a mill dam at the Round Tail in order to impound their escaping water. This flooded the Cataraqui Flood Plain by about 6 feet, making it navigable by canoe and allowing direct navigation to Kingston. When the Rideau Canal was built (1826-1832) Haskins' mill dam at White Fish Falls was replaced by a canal dam and weir (at the foot of today's Morton Bay), and the dam at Round Tail replaced by a canal dam at Upper Brewers. The Rideau Canal dam at the foot of Morton Bay now diverts most of the flow to the Cataraqui River. Today's slow flowing Morton Creek (partially flooded due to the dam at Lyndhurst, Ontario) is all that is left of the original White Fish River.

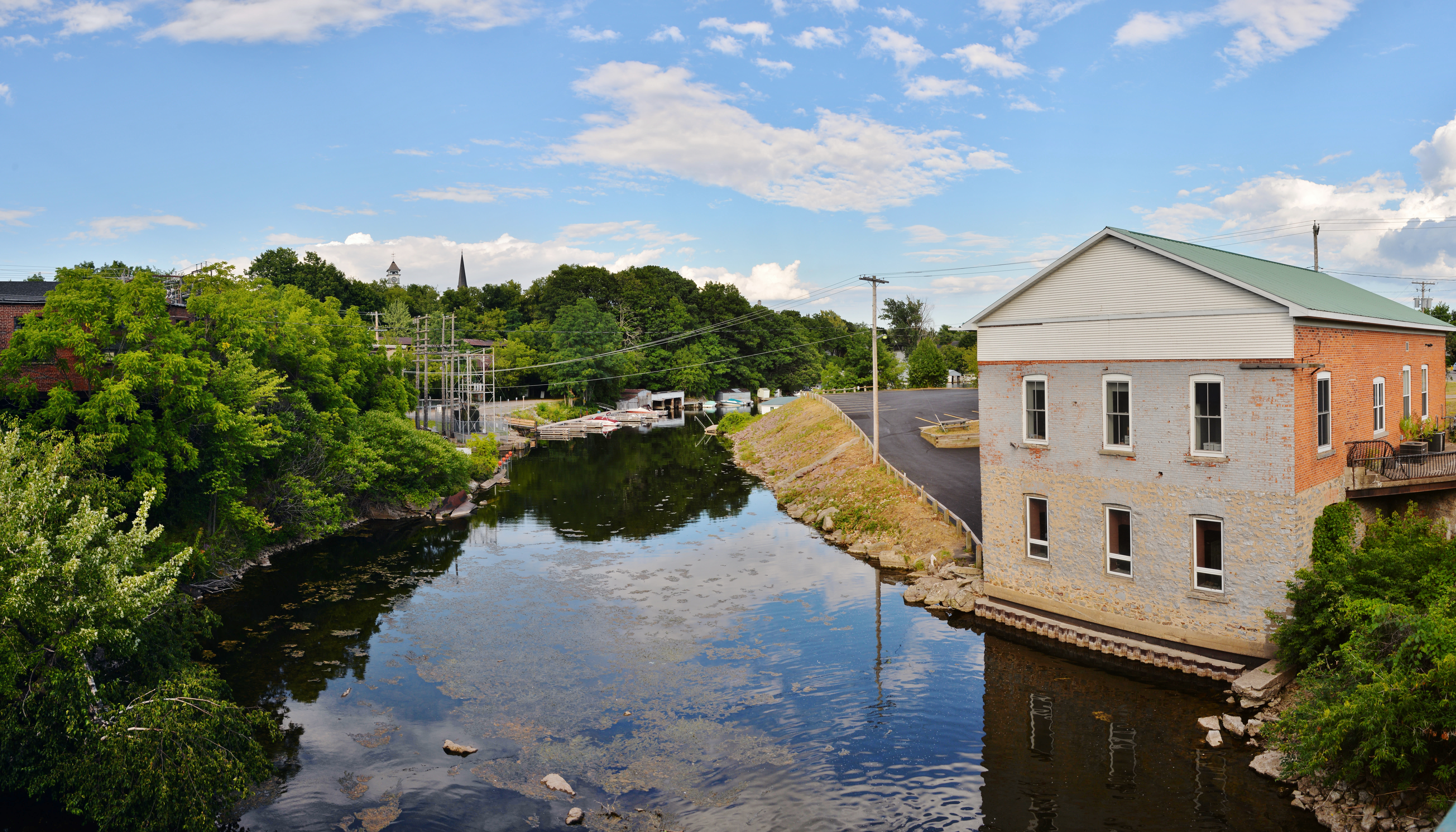
Gananoque River at the Gananoque Generating Station

== See also ==
- List of rivers of Ontario
- Gananoque River Bridge

== Sources ==
- Map 6 (PDF) (Map). 1 : 700,000. Official road map of Ontario. Ministry of Transportation of Ontario. 2010-01-01.
- Restructured municipalities - Ontario map #5 (Map). Restructuring Maps of Ontario. Ontario Ministry of Municipal Affairs and Housing. 2006. Archived from the original on 2020-05-11.
