= Gananoque station =

Railway station in Ontario, Canada

Gananoque
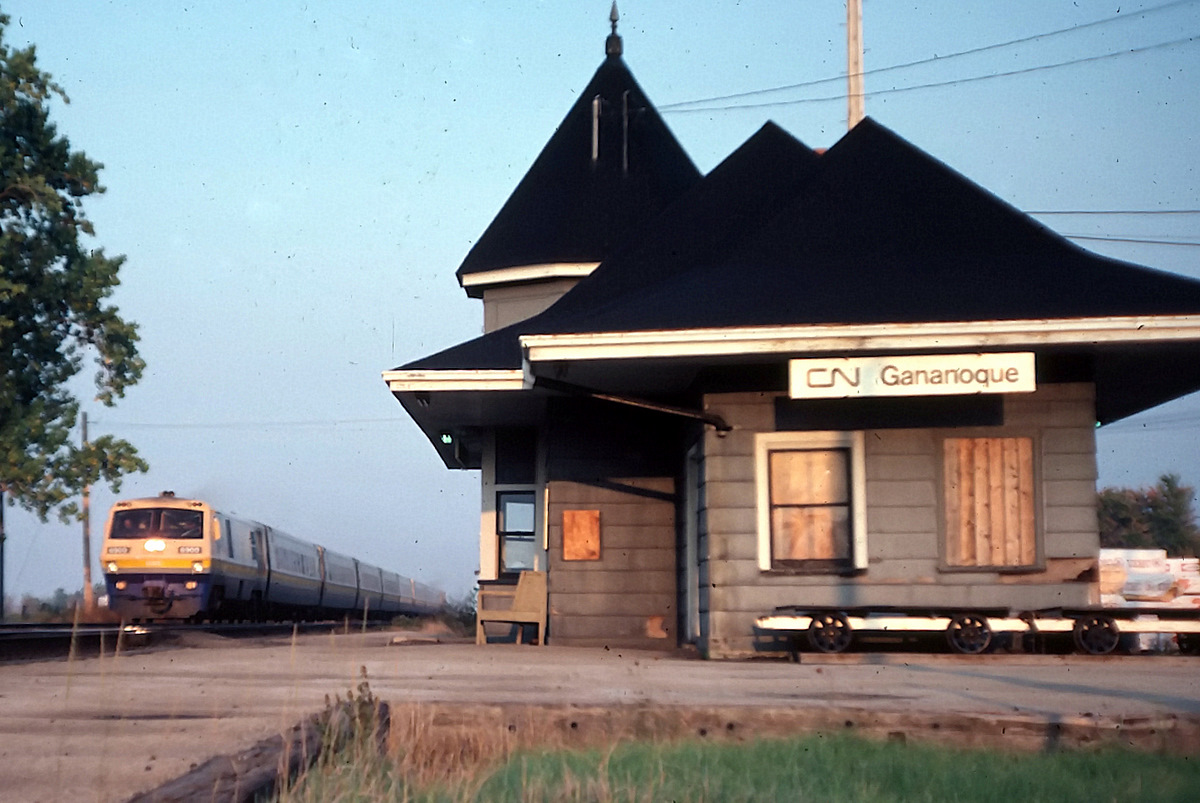
- Gananoque station in 1982

General information
- Location: North Station Road; Gananoque, Ontario; Canada
- Coordinates: 44°22′08″N 76°09′13″W
- Platforms: 1 side platform, 1 island platform
- Tracks: 2

Construction
- Parking: Short term only

Other information
- Status: Sign post
- Website: Gananoque train station

History
- Opened: 1915

Services
Preceding station	Via Rail	Following station
Kingston toward Toronto	Toronto–Ottawa	Brockville toward Ottawa
Former services
Preceding station	Canadian National Railway	Following station
Rideau toward Sarnia	Grand Trunk Railway; Main Line	Lansdowne toward Montreal
Location
- Location within Southern Ontario Location within Ontario Location within Canada

Gananoque railway station in Gananoque, Ontario, Canada is served by Via Rail trains running from Toronto to Ottawa.

== History ==
Gananoque Junction was originally served by two railways: the Grand Trunk Montréal-Toronto mainline and the Thousand Islands Railway, an 8-kilometre (5.0 mi) short line railway that led to the waterfront. A mainline station also once existed in Lansdowne but was torn down soon after CN abandoned service to the village, in 1966.

The rail junction was relocated to the current station location in 1901 while timber shipments to Gananoque's docks were declining and tourism on the line was growing, with the Thousand Islands heavily promoted as a vacation destination by rail and steamship. Unlike most stations of its era, Gananoque Junction had no freight-handling facility and was solely a passenger station.

The last passengers transferred from CN to the Thousand Island Railway at Gananoque Junction in 1962. The short line's tracks are now gone.

While the junction station remains in service, a huge water tank that towered over Gananoque Junction in the steam train era is now gone. Locomotive #500 from the now-defunct short line operation is on display next to Gananoque town hall; the Arthur Child Heritage Museum occupies the site of the former Gananoque waterfront station.

== Services ==
Gananoque station is only served by local trains on Via Rail's Toronto-Ottawa route. Most Toronto-Ottawa trains and all Toronto-Montreal trains pass through the station without stopping.

As of October 2023 the station is served by one to two trains per day toward Ottawa, and two trains per day toward Toronto.
