= Gananoque Lake =

Lake in Ontario, Canada

- Location within Ontario
- Location: Ontario
- Coordinates: 44.445°N 76.152°W
- Basin countries: Canada

Gananoque Lake is a lake of eastern Ontario, Canada, located about 16 kilometres north of the town of Gananoque.

== See also ==
- List of lakes in Ontario
