= 1000 Islands History Museum =

History museum in Canada

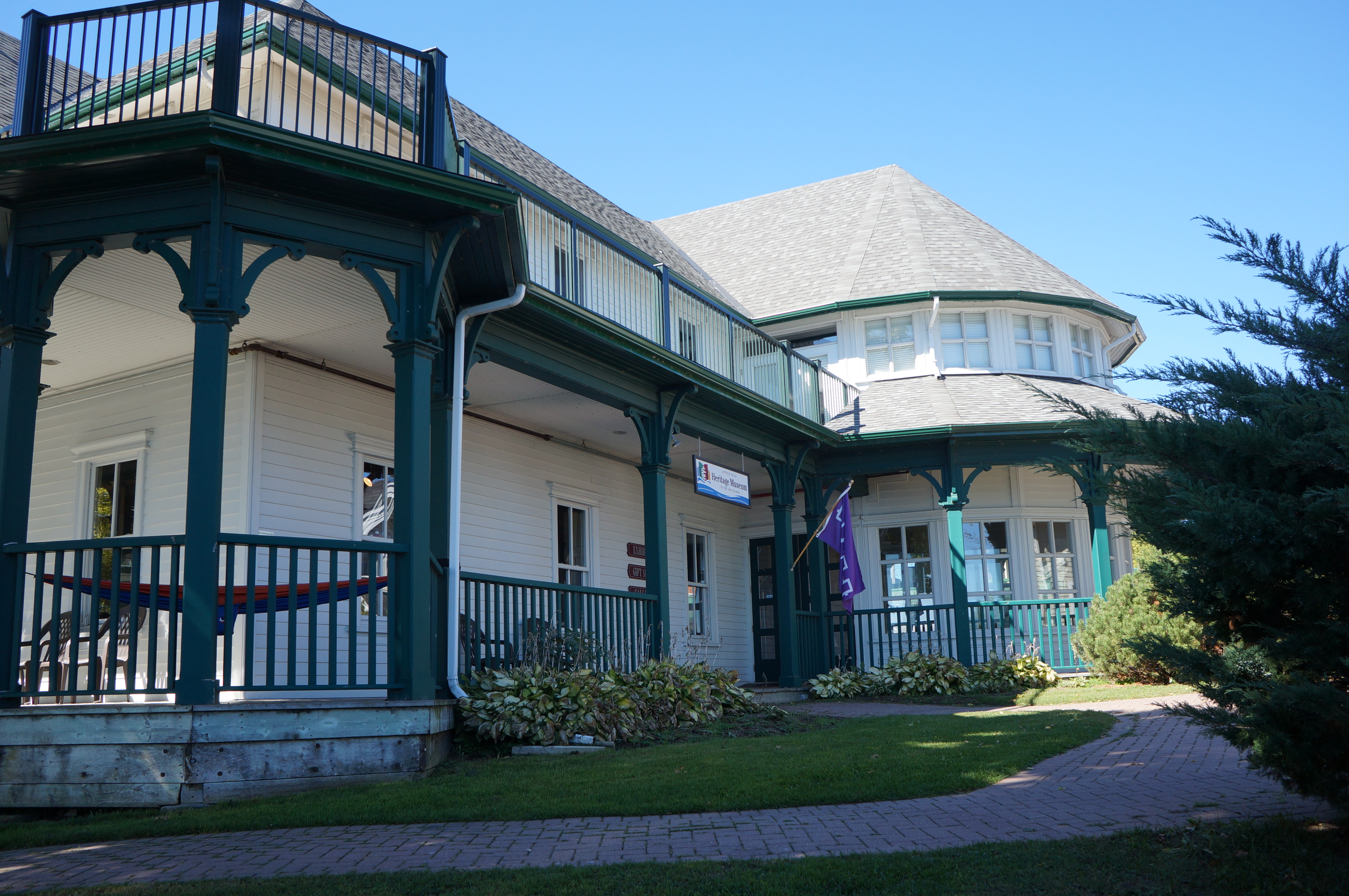

- Location of the museum in Ontario
- Location: Gananoque, Ontario, Canada
- Coordinates: 44°19′27″N 76°09′40″W
- Type: Heritage centre
- Visitors: 30000
- Website: Official website

The 1000 Islands History Museum is a museum in Gananoque, Ontario, Canada, that interprets the history and ecology of Gananoque and the 1000 Islands. It was once the site of the Thousand Island Railway station.

Starting with an ancient mountain range and continuing to the present day, this Museum tells a story of the cultures and creatures who have lived along the shores of the St. Lawrence River, in and around the Town of Gananoque. The museum also provides travelling exhibits, such as an exhibit on Canadian women in STEM in 2020.
