= Gananoque =

- Town (single-tier)
- Town of Gananoque
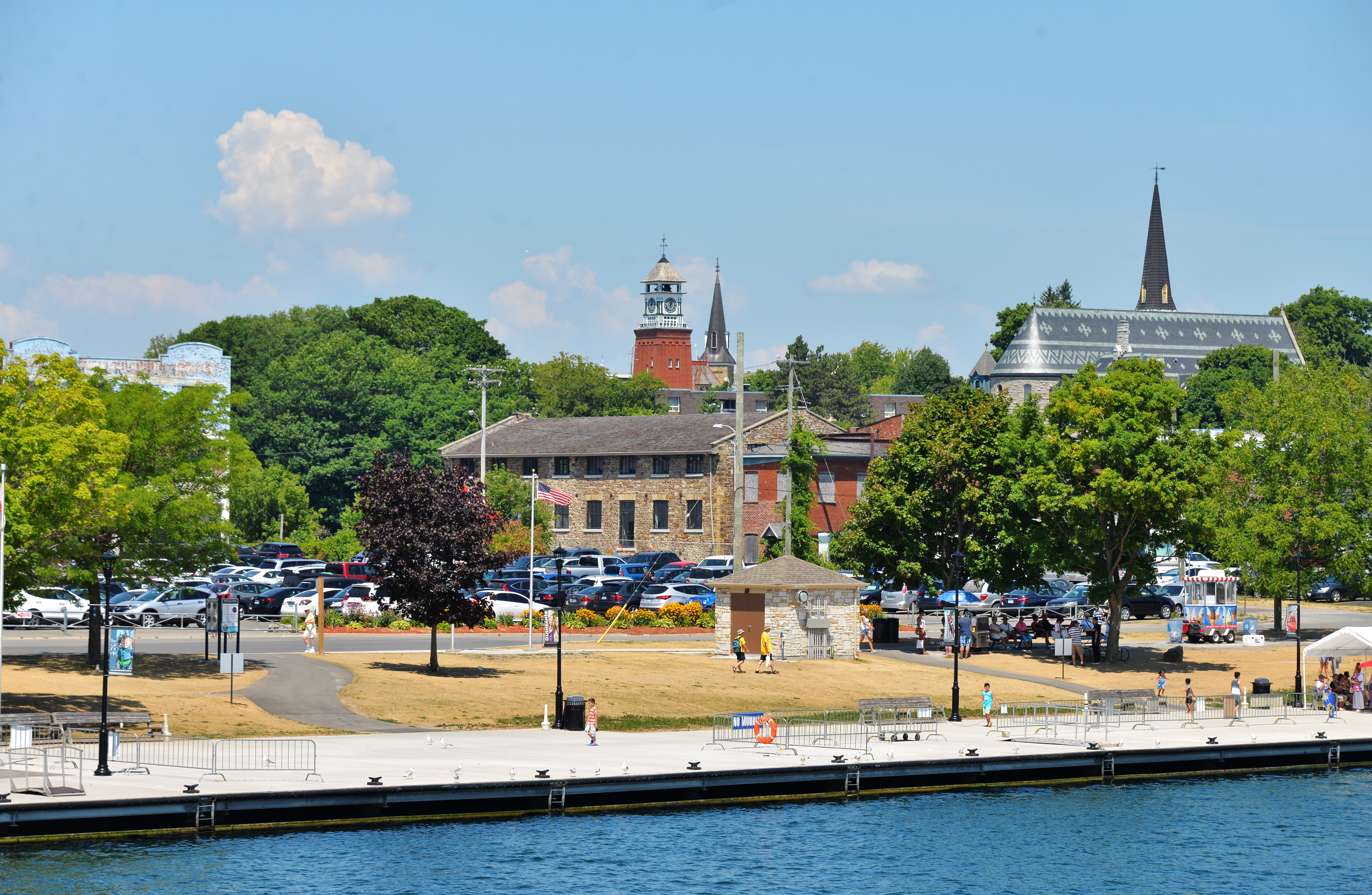

- Flag
- Nicknames: Gateway to the Thousand Islands; Gan, the Noq
- Motto: Pax Vobiscum (Latin: "Peace Be With You")
- Location within United Counties of Leeds and Grenville Location within Southern Ontario
- Coordinates: 44°20′N 76°10′W
- Country: Canada
- Province: Ontario
- County: Leeds and Grenville
- Settled: 1789
- Incorporated: 1890 (as town)

Government
  - Type: Town
  - Mayor: Colin Brown
  - Fed. riding: Leeds—Grenville—Thousand Islands and Rideau Lakes
  - Prov. riding: Leeds—Grenville—Thousand Islands and Rideau Lakes

Area
  - Land: 7.01 km^{2} (2.71 sq mi)

Population (2021)
  - Total: 5,383
  - Density: 768.4/km^{2} (1,990/sq mi)
- Time zone: UTC−5 (EST)
  - Summer (DST): UTC−4 (EDT)
- Postal code: K7G
- Area code: 613
- Website: www.gananoque.ca

Gananoque (/ˌɡænəˈnɒkweɪ/ GAN-ə-NOK-way) is a town in the United Counties of Leeds and Grenville of Ontario, Canada. The town had a population of 5,383 year-round residents in the 2021 Canadian Census, as well as summer residents sometimes referred to as "Islanders" because of the Thousand Islands in the St. Lawrence River, Gananoque's most important tourist attraction. The Gananoque River flows through the town and the St. Lawrence River serves as the southern boundary of the town.

== Etymology ==
The name "Gananoque", first given to the river, is of indigenous origin, but its roots and meaning are unclear. Over the centuries, it has been written in no less than 57 different variations, making it difficult to determine its meaning.

Among the possible meanings proposed are:

- The door to the flint at the mountain
- Rocks rising out of the water
- Water Rising over Rocks
- Garden of the Great Spirit
- Place of health

The Mohawk-English Dictionary of 1971 lists the name as Kananókwi or Kananóhkwih.

== History ==
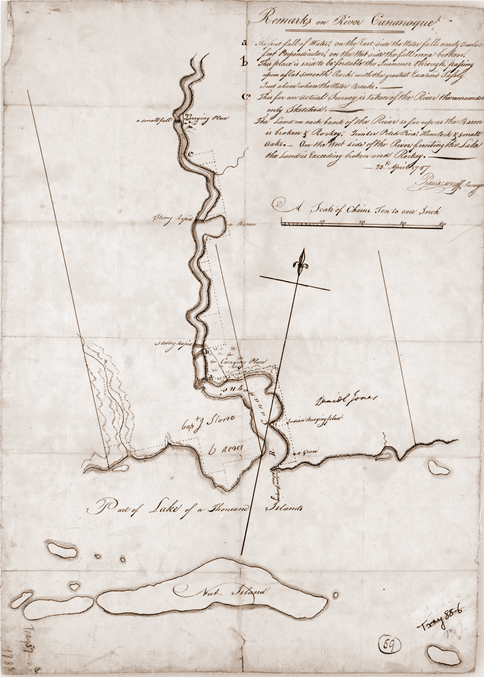
A surveyor's map of Gananoque from 1787

In 1784, the site was surveyed and land was granted to Loyalists John Johnson (on the east side of the Gananoque River) and Colonel Joel Stone (on the west side). Johnson did little to develop his possession, but Col Stone, who served with Loyalist militia during the American Revolutionary War, established a sawmill on this site in 1789. In 1812, Charles McDonald laid out the town site and also built a mill, its first store, and church there.

During the War of 1812, American forces raided the government depot in the town to disrupt the flow of British supplies between Kingston and Montreal. The raiders seized the supplies they found and burned the depot. Within a month of the raid, construction of the Gananoque Blockhouse was started, with completion in 1813. It had an octagonal log parapet containing five guns. The blockhouse was abandoned after the War of 1812 and given to a private landowner.

The blockhouse was quickly repaired in the 1837–38 Patriot War when there were fears American militia forces were planning to attack. The Gananoque Blockhouse stood until 1852.

In 1890, Gananoque was incorporated as a town.

== Demographics ==
In the 2021 Census of Population conducted by Statistics Canada, Gananoque had a population of 5,383 living in 2,562 of its 2,767 total private dwellings, a change of 4.3% from its 2016 population of 5,159. With a land area of 7.01 km^{2} (2.71 sq mi), it had a population density of 767.9/km^{2} (1,988.9/sq mi) in 2021.

Historical census populations – Gananoque

Year	Pop.	±%
1871	2,020	—
1881	2,871	+42.1%
1891	3,669	+27.8%
1901	3,526	−3.9%
1911	3,804	+7.9%
1921	3,604	−5.3%
1931	3,592	−0.3%
1941	4,044	+12.6%

Year	Pop.	±%
1951	4,572	+13.1%
1956	4,981	+8.9%
1961	5,096	+2.3%
1966	5,237	+2.8%
1971	5,212	−0.5%
1976	5,103	−2.1%
1981	4,863	−4.7%
1986	4,939	+1.6%

Year	Pop.	±%
1991	5,209	+5.5%
1996	5,219	+0.2%
2001	5,167	−1.0%
2006	5,285	+2.3%
2011	5,194	−1.7%
2016	5,159	−0.7%
2021	5,383	+4.3%

Population counts are not adjusted for boundary changes.
Source: Statistics Canada

Private dwellings occupied by usual residents (2021): 2,562 (total: 2,767).

Mother tongue (2021):

- English as first language: 93.4%
- French as first language: 2.2%
- English and French as first language: 0.7%
- Other as first language: 3.1%

== Local attractions ==
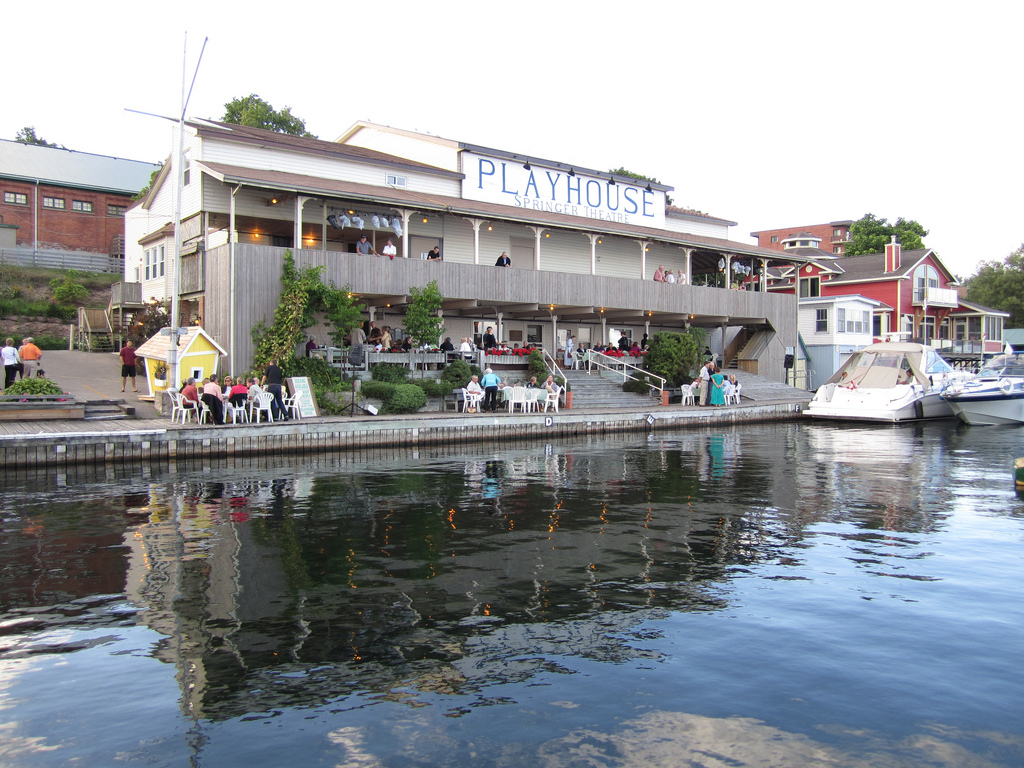
Thousand Islands Playhouse

Gananoque is referred to as the "Gateway to the Thousand Islands," which lie next to it in the St. Lawrence River. Local attractions include boat cruises through the Thousand Islands and to Boldt Castle, New York, live theatre, the summer theatre festival of The Thousand Islands Playhouse, the Arthur Child Heritage Museum of the 1000 Islands, Thousand Islands Boat Museum, and the Shorelines Casino Thousand Islands. The theatre company in Gananoque is The Thousand Islands Playhouse which operates two theatre spaces: The Springer Theatre, and the Firehall Theatre, attracting international attention since 1982.

The Thousand Islands – Frontenac Arch Biosphere Reserve, designated in November 2002, is the third in Ontario, the twelfth in Canada, and one of over 400 around the world, and is part of UNESCO’s program on Man and the Biosphere.

== Transportation ==
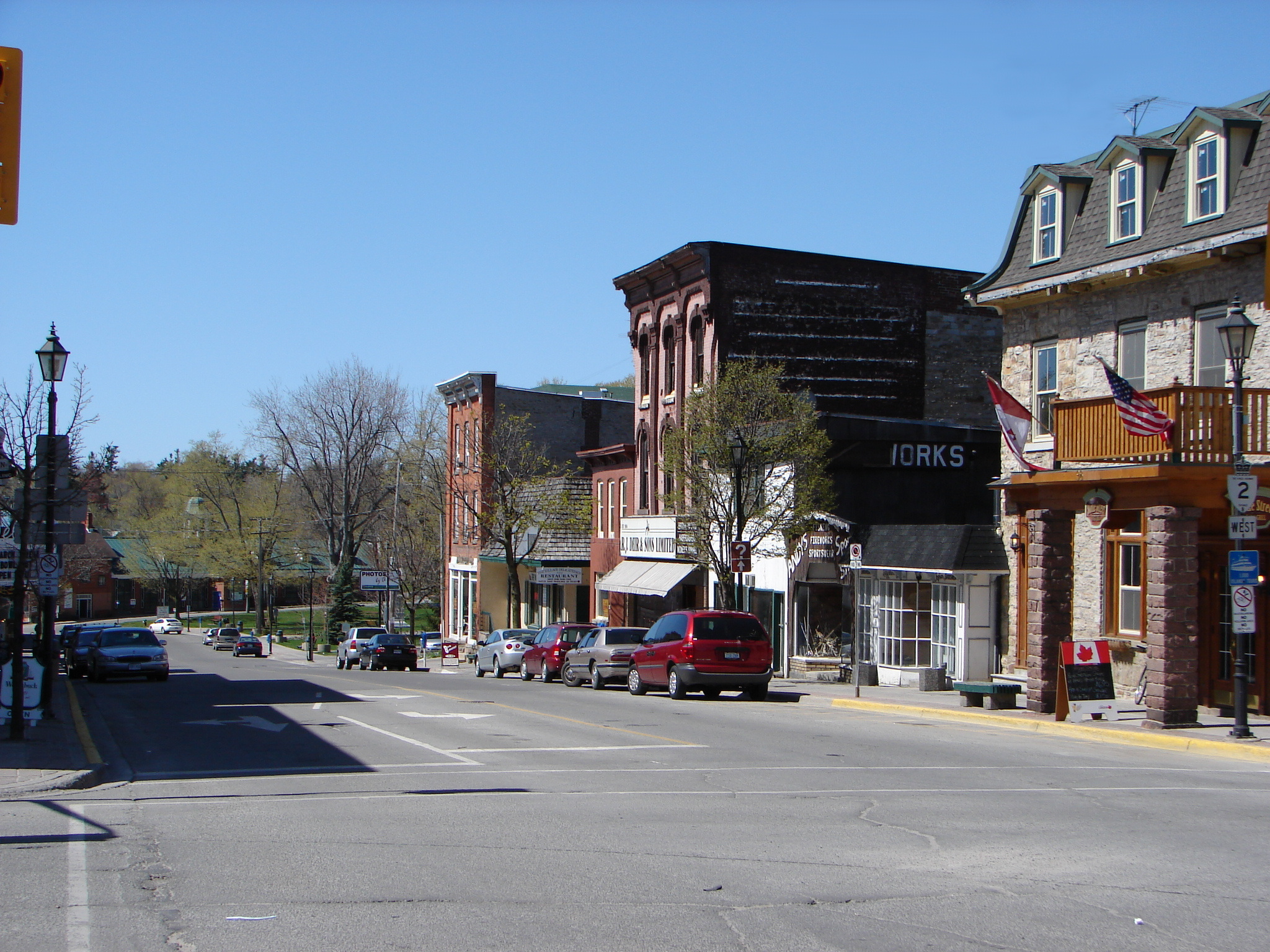
King Street

Gananoque lies directly on three of Canada's busiest transportation routes: the four-lane Highway 401, the double-track Canadian National Railway main line, and the St. Lawrence Seaway. It is also home to a rich provincial highway heritage, being home to the remaining stretch of Highway 2. It is the western terminus of the Thousand Islands Parkway, and a short drive from the Thousand Islands Bridge, which crosses into the United States as Interstate 81.

Via Rail inter-city passenger trains bound for Toronto and Ottawa stop at the unstaffed Gananoque station to the north of downtown. Gananoque is also served by the Gananoque Airport for general aviation.

Historically, the Gananoque River's watershed had been an important water transportation corridor, extending north to the Rideau River watershed and playing a key role in the town's early history and economic importance. In 1830, water was diverted near Newboro to the Cataraqui River as part of the Rideau Canal, sending this traffic instead to Kingston.

A four-mile short line railroad once linked the main CN Rail tracks to the heart of the village; the Thousand Islands Railway terminated near the town hall.

== Gananoque Police Service ==
Gananoque Police Service is a small law enforcement agency in the Eastern Ontario community of Gananoque.

The current Chief of Police is Scott Gee. Unlike other Towns and Villages of Ontario which have disbanded their municipal police forces in favour of contracting with the Ontario Provincial Police, the Gananoque Police Service continues to grow.

== Media ==
=== Radio ===
Gananoque has its own radio station, CJGM-FM which operates at 99.9 FM. Other radio stations that can be heard in Gananoque and areas are from Brockville, Kingston with some Ottawa area stations, including upstate New York.

The 1000 Islands Drive in theater uses 91.5 FM for transmitting audio from the movies into car radios.

=== Newspapers ===
The Gananoque Reporter, a weekly community paper that serves the Gananoque and the surrounding 1000 Islands area which dates back to the 1800s.

== Notable persons ==
- Harry Brown—Gananoque-born recipient of the Victoria Cross for actions during the Battle of Hill 70 during the First World War
- Frank Belknap Long—Famed horror and science fiction writer. Long spent his summer family vacations in the vicinity with his parents, between the ages of six months and 17 years (1901–1918).
- Alyn McCauley—Gananoque-raised former NHL hockey player who currently serves as a pro scout for the Philadelphia Flyers.
