= Dunlop (surname) =

Dunlop is a surname, originating in Ayrshire, Scotland. Notable people with the surname include:

- Andrew Dunlop, Baron Dunlop (born 1959), British politician
- Andy Dunlop (born 1972), Scottish guitarist
- Beveridge C. Dunlop (1879–1961), New York politician
- Bill Dunlop (born 1963), Canadian boxer
- Blake Dunlop (born 1953), Canadian ice-hockey player
- Bob Dunlop (boxer) (1945–2000), Australian boxer of the 1960s
- Bob Dunlop (footballer) (born 1935), Australian rules footballer
- Boyd Lee Dunlop (1926–2013), American jazz pianist
- Brian Dunlop (1938–2009), Australian artist
- Charles Dunlop (1870–1911), Scottish cricketer who played for Somerset
- Daniel Nicol Dunlop (1868–1935), British anthroposophist and electrical industry executive
- David Colin Dunlop (1897–1968), Dean of Lincoln, Bishop of Jarrow
- David Dunlop (cricketer) (1855–1898), Scottish-born cricketer in New Zealand
- Derrick Dunlop (1902–1980), Scottish physician and founder of the "Dunlop Committee" on drug abuse
- Douglas Dunlop, Scottish teacher and missionary; consultant (1880s–1919) to the Egyptian minister of education
- Douglas Morton Dunlop (1909–1987), Scottish-American professor of history and orientalist
- Ed Dunlop (born 1968), British thoroughbred racehorse trainer
- Edward Arunah Dunlop (1876–1934), Canadian politician
- Ernest Dunlop (1893–1969), Scottish bacteriologist
- Florence Dunlop, Canadian pioneer in education for special needs children
- Frank Dunlop (disambiguation), several people
- Fuchsia Dunlop, English writer and chef, granddaughter of David Colin Dunlop
- Garfield Dunlop, Canadian politician (currently opposition chief whip)
- Graham Dunlop (born 1976), Scottish field hockey player
- Henry Dunlop of Craigton (1799–1867), Lord Provost of Glasgow
- Ian Dunlop (disambiguation), several people
- Isobel Dunlop (1901–1975), composer
- Jack Dunlop "Three Fingered Jack" (c.1872 – February 24, 1900) American outlaw
- James Dunlop (disambiguation), several people, including:

- James Dunlop (1793–1848), Scottish astronomer
- James Dunlop (judge) (1793–1872), United States federal judge
- James Dunlop (astronomer), Scottish astronomer and academic
- James Dunlop of Dunlop (1759–1832), British Army officer, MP for Kirkcudbright Stewartry
- James Dunlop (footballer) (1870–1892), Scottish footballer (St Mirren and Scotland)
- James Dunlop (rugby union) (1854–1923), Scotland rugby union player
- Sir James Dunlop, 2nd Baronet (1830–1858), of the Dunlop baronets

- Janette Dunlop (1891–1971), Scottish physicist and teacher
- Jim Dunlop Sr, founder of Dunlop Manufacturing
- Joan Dunlop, (1934–2012), British and American women's health advocate
- Joey Dunlop (1952–2000), Northern Ireland motorcycle racer
- John Dunlop (disambiguation), several persons, including:

- John Dunlop (American football) (1874–1957), American football coach
- John Dunlop (curler) (born 1975), American curler
- John Dunlop (Unionist politician) (1910–1996), MP for Mid Ulster
- John Dunlop (minister) (born 1939), Irish Presbyterian minister
- John Dunlop (writer) (1755–1820), Scottish songwriter and writer
- John B. Dunlop (born 1942), American political scientist
- John Boyd Dunlop (1840–1921), inventor of the pneumatic tyre, founded Dunlop rubber company
- John Colin Dunlop (1785–1842), Scottish historian
- John Dunlop (racehorse trainer) (1939–2018), British horse-racing trainer
- John Gibb Dunlop (1844–1913), Scottish engineer and shipbuilder
- John T. Dunlop (Virginia politician) (1842–1907), American politician
- John Thomas Dunlop (1914–2003), American administrator, US Secretary of Labor
- John Dunlop of Dunlop (1806–1839), British Member of Parliament for Kilmarnock Burghs

- Juliet Dunlop, British television journalist
- Lesley Dunlop (born 1956), British actress
- Marion Wallace Dunlop (1864–1942), British suffragette
- Michael Dunlop (born 1988), Northern Ireland motorcycle racer
- Michael Dunlop (footballer, born 1982), Scottish football defender
- Sir Nathaniel Dunlop (1830–1919) Glasgow shipowner and philanthropist
- Penelope Jane Dunlop (born 1960), South African entertainer also known as PJ Powers
- Robert Dunlop (disambiguation), several people, including:
  - Robert Dunlop (1960–2008), Northern Ireland motorcycle racer
  - Robert Graham Dunlop (1790–1841), British naval officer and office-holder in Upper Canada
  - Robert Dunlop (historian) (1861–1930), English historian
  - Robert Dunlop (Oklahoma politician) (1869-?), Oklahoma State Treasurer
- Ronald Ossory Dunlop (1894–1973), Irish artist
- Sibyl Dunlop (1889–1968), British jewellery designer, Arts and Crafts work of the 1920s and 1930s
- Tessa Dunlop, a British historian, TV presenter and author
- Sir Thomas Dunlop, 1st Baronet (1855–1938), Scottish businessman
- Weary Dunlop (Sir Ernest Edward Dunlop, 1907–1993), Australian surgeon and prisoner of war hero
- William Dunlop (disambiguation), several people named William and Billy

== See also ==
- Dunlap (surname)
