= John Dunlop =

John Dunlop may refer to:

- John B. Dunlop (1942–2023), American political scientist
- John Boyd Dunlop (1840–1921), Scottish/Irish inventor of the pneumatic tyre and founder of the Dunlop rubber company
- John Colin Dunlop (1785–1842), Scottish historian
- John Dunlop (racehorse trainer) (1939–2018), British horse-racing trainer
- John Gibb Dunlop (1844–1913), Scottish engineer and shipbuilder
- John T. Dunlop (Virginia politician) (1842–1907), American politician in the Virginia House of Delegates
- John Thomas Dunlop (1914–2003), American administrator, former US Secretary of Labor
- John Dunlop of Dunlop (1806–1839), British Member of Parliament for Kilmarnock Burghs
- John Dunlop (American football) (1874–1957), American football coach
- John Dunlop (chess player) (1884–1973), six-time New Zealand chess champion
- John Dunlop (curler) (born 1975), American curler
- John Dunlop (Unionist politician) (1910–1996), former MP for Mid Ulster
- John Dunlop (minister) (born 1939), Irish Presbyterian minister
- John Dunlop (writer) (1755–1820), Scottish songwriter and writer

== See also ==
- Jack Dunlop (c. 1872–1900), outlaw of the American Old West
- John Dunlap (1747–1812), first printer of the Declaration of Independence
- Bellefonte Forge House, Pennsylvania, also known as the John Dunlop House
