= Thomas Dunlop =

Thomas Dunlop may refer to:

- Sir Thomas Dunlop, 1st Baronet (1855–1938), Scottish businessman
- Thomas Dunlop (footballer) (1872–?), Scottish footballer of the 1890s
- Thomas Dunlop (cricketer) (1878 - 1960), Scottish cricketer and soldier
- Sir Thomas Dunlop, 2nd Baronet (1881–1963)
- Thomas Dunlop (Australian politician) (1880–1956), member of the Queensland Legislative Assembly
- Thomas Dunlop Galbraith, 1st Baron Strathclyde (1891 – 1985), Scottish politician
- Sir Thomas Dunlop, 3rd Baronet (1912–1999), Scottish businessman
- Sir Thomas Dunlop, 4th Baronet (born 1951)
