= Dunlop baronets of Woodbourne (1916) =

The Dunlop baronetcy, of Woodbourne in the County of Renfrew, was created in the Baronetage of the United Kingdom on 6 July 1916, for the Scottish businessman Thomas Dunlop. He was Lord Provost of Glasgow between 1914 and 1917.

== Dunlop baronets, of Woodbourne (1916) ==
- Sir Thomas Dunlop, 1st Baronet (1855–1938)
- Sir Thomas Dunlop, 2nd Baronet (1881–1963)
- Sir Thomas Dunlop, 3rd Baronet (1912–1999)
- Sir Thomas Dunlop, 4th Baronet (born 1951)

The heir apparent is Thomas Dunlop (born 1990), only son of the 4th Baronet.

=== Line of succession ===
- Sir Thomas Dunlop, 1st Baronet (1855–1938)
  - Sir Thomas Dunlop, 2nd Baronet (1881–1963)
    - Sir Thomas Dunlop, 3rd Baronet (1912–1999)
      - Sir Thomas Dunlop, 4th Baronet (born 1951)
        - (1) Thomas Dunlop (b. 1990)
    - William Beckett Dunlop (1915–1970)
      - (2) Anthony Charles Beckett Dunlop (b. 1948)
      - (3) Michael William Beckett Dunlop (b. 1951)
        - (4) John William Dunlop (b. 1981)
        - (5) Stephen James Dunlop (b. 1983)
        - (6) Alasdair Graham Dunlop (b. 1986)
      - (7) Simon Speirs Beckett Dunlop (b. 1955)
  - Robert Jack Dunlop (1891–1952)
    - George Teacher Dunlop (1923–1992)
      - (8) Nichloas George Teacher Dunlop (b. 1956)
        - (9) Angus George Teacher Dunlop (b. 1979)
      - Robert Jack Dunlop (1927–2018)
        - (10) Robert Alastair Dunlop (b. 1951)
          - (11) Robert Michael Dunlop (b. 1985)
        - (12) Timothy Dixon Dunlop (b. 1953)
          - (13) Ross Timothy Dunlop (b. 1983)
          - (14) Brodie Kenneth Dunlop (b. c. 1985)
          - (15) Gavin Craig Dunlop (b. 1989)
          - (16) Finian Dixon Dunlop (b. 2012)
        - (17) Andrew James Dunlop, Baron Dunlop (b. 1959)
