= SS Queen Cristina =

Queen Cristina was the name of two steamships operated by Thomas Dunlop & Sons.

- SS Queen Cristina (1896), wrecked in 1899 off Lihou Reef in Coral Sea.
- SS Queen Cristina (1901), wrecked in 1907 on North Seal Rock off Crescent City.
