= James Dunlop (disambiguation) =

James Dunlop (1793–1848) was a Scottish astronomer.

James Dunlop or Jim Dunlop may also refer to:

- Jim Dunlop Sr, founder of Dunlop Manufacturing
- Jim Dunlop (sport shooter) (born 1942), Scottish sport shooter
- James Dunlop (judge) (1793–1872), United States federal judge
- James Dunlop (astronomer), Scottish astronomer and academic
- James Dunlop of Dunlop (1759–1832), Scottish laird, British Army officer, MP for Kirkcudbright Stewartry 1812–26
- James Dunlop (footballer) (1870–1892), Scottish footballer (St Mirren and Scotland)
- James Dunlop (rugby union) (1854–1923), Scotland rugby union player
- Sir James Dunlop, 2nd Baronet (1830–1858), of the Dunlop baronets

== See also ==
- Dunlop (surname)
