= Dunlap =

Dunlap may refer to:

== Places ==
In the United States

- Dunlap, California, an unincorporated town in Fresno County
- Dunlap, Illinois, a village
- Dunlap, Indiana, a census-designated place
- Dunlap, Iowa, a city
- Dunlap, Kansas, a city
- Dunlap, Missouri, an unincorporated community
- Dunlap, Ohio, a census-designated place
- Dunlap, Tennessee, a city
- Dunlap, Philadelphia, Pennsylvania, a neighborhood
- Dunlap, Seattle, Washington, a neighborhood

Elsewhere

- David Dunlap Observatory, Richmond Hill, Ontario

== People ==
- Dunlap Exclusive (born 1983), musical artist
- Dunlap (surname)

== See also ==
- Dunlop (disambiguation)
