= Gord Brooks =

Canadian ice hockey player (1950–2020)

- Born: September 11, 1950 Cobourg, Ontario, Canada
- Died: October 1, 2020 (aged 70) London, Ontario, Canada
- Height: 5 ft 10 in (178 cm)
- Weight: 175 lb (79 kg; 12 st 7 lb)
- Position: Right wing
- Shot: Right
- Played for: St. Louis Blues; Washington Capitals; Klagenfurter AC
- NHL draft: 51st overall, 1970; St. Louis Blues
- Playing career: 1970–1987

Gordon John Brooks (11 September 1950 – 1 October 2020) was a Canadian professional ice hockey right winger. He played 70 games in the National Hockey League (NHL) with the St. Louis Blues and Washington Capitals from 1971 to 1975. The rest of his career, which lasted from 1970 to 1987, was mainly spent in the minor leagues.

== Personal life ==
Brooks was born on 11 September 1950, in Cobourg, Ontario. He died on 1 October 2020, at University Hospital, London, Ontario, aged 70.

== Playing career ==
Drafted in 1970 by the St. Louis Blues, Brooks played 32 games with the Blues before being left exposed for the 1974 NHL Expansion Draft, where he was claimed by the Washington Capitals. Brooks played 38 games during the Capitals' inaugural season before returning to play in the minors where he retired following the 1983–84 season. He subsequently played two seasons in the OHA Senior League until 1987.

== Career statistics ==
=== Regular season and playoffs ===
| | | | Regular season | | | | | Playoffs |
| Season | Team | League | GP | G | A | Pts | PIM | GP | G | A | Pts | PIM |
|---|---|---|---|---|---|---|---|---|---|---|---|---|
| 1968–69 | Hamilton Red Wings | OHA | 54 | 9 | 7 | 16 | 47 | 5 | 1 | 1 | 2 | 5 |
| 1969–70 | Hamilton Red Wings | OHA | 21 | 6 | 5 | 11 | 32 | — | — | — | — | — |
| 1969–70 | London Knights | OHA | 31 | 9 | 23 | 32 | 47 | 12 | 5 | 11 | 16 | 14 |
| 1970–71 | Kansas City Blues | CHL | 67 | 16 | 16 | 32 | 44 | — | — | — | — | — |
| 1971–72 | St. Louis Blues | NHL | 2 | 0 | 0 | 0 | 0 | — | — | — | — | — |
| 1971–72 | Kansas City Blues | CHL | 62 | 21 | 18 | 39 | 34 | — | — | — | — | — |
| 1972–73 | Fort Worth Wings | CHL | 23 | 10 | 16 | 26 | 22 | 3 | 0 | 0 | 0 | 0 |
| 1973–74 | St. Louis Blues | NHL | 30 | 6 | 8 | 14 | 12 | — | — | — | — | — |
| 1973–74 | Denver Spurs | WHL | 41 | 20 | 20 | 40 | 34 | — | — | — | — | — |
| 1974–75 | Washington Capitals | NHL | 38 | 1 | 10 | 11 | 25 | — | — | — | — | — |
| 1974–75 | Richmond Robins | AHL | 15 | 3 | 4 | 7 | 8 | 3 | 0 | 0 | 0 | 2 |
| 1975–76 | Philadelphia Firebirds | NAHL | 66 | 39 | 54 | 93 | 46 | 16 | 15 | 17 | 32 | 4 |
| 1976–77 | Philadelphia Firebirds | NAHL | 74 | 65 | 59 | 124 | 37 | 4 | 1 | 5 | 6 | 4 |
| 1977–78 | Philadelphia Firebirds | AHL | 81 | 42 | 56 | 98 | 40 | 4 | 0 | 0 | 0 | 2 |
| 1978–79 | Philadelphia Firebirds | AHL | 80 | 43 | 31 | 74 | 27 | — | — | — | — | — |
| 1979–80 | Syracuse Firebirds | AHL | 77 | 34 | 41 | 75 | 38 | 4 | 1 | 1 | 2 | 0 |
| 1980–81 | Klagenfurter AC | AUT | 13 | 13 | 13 | 26 | 12 | — | — | — | — | — |
| 1980–81 | Saginaw Gears | IHL | 39 | 17 | 25 | 42 | 4 | 13 | 8 | 9 | 17 | 6 |
| 1981–82 | Saginaw Gears | IHL | 82 | 49 | 64 | 113 | 35 | 14 | 12 | 9 | 21 | 0 |
| 1982–83 | Saginaw Gears | IHL | 21 | 15 | 9 | 24 | 6 | — | — | — | — | — |
| 1983–84 | Toledo Goaldiggers | IHL | 5 | 0 | 3 | 3 | 0 | — | — | — | — | — |
| 1985–86 | Petrolia Aces | OHA Sr | 36 | 22 | 31 | 53 | — | — | — | — | — | — |
| 1986–87 | Brantford Motts Clamatos | OHA Sr | 33 | 4 | 16 | 20 | 8 | — | — | — | — | — |
| AHL totals | | | 253 | 122 | 132 | 254 | 113 | 11 | 1 | 1 | 2 | 4 |
| NHL totals | | | 70 | 7 | 18 | 25 | 37 | — | — | — | — | — |

== Awards ==
- NAHL Second All-Star Team (1976–77)
- AHL First All-Star Team (1977–78)
- John B. Sollenberger Trophy (AHL Leading Scorer) (1977–78) (tied with Rick Adduono)
- IHL First All-Star Team (1981–82)
