= Duncan Dunlop =

Scottish politician

Duncan Dunlop MSP
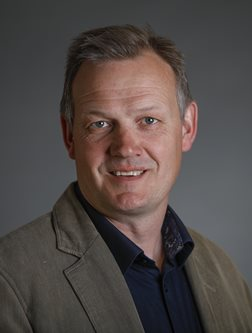
- Official portrait, 2026

Member of the Scottish Parliament for South Scotland (1 of 7 Regional MSPs)
- Incumbent
- Assumed office 7 May 2026

Scottish Liberal Democrat portfolios
- 2026–present: Spokesperson for Education, Children and Young People

Personal details
- Party: Scottish Liberal Democrats
- Relations: Derrick Dunlop (grandfather); Tessa Dunlop (sister)
- Website: www.scotlibdems.org.uk/about-us/our-candidates/duncan-dunlop

Duncan Angus Melville Dunlop (born September 1976) is a Scottish Liberal Democrat politician who has served as a Member of the Scottish Parliament for South Scotland since May 2026.

== Biography ==
Dunlop is a charity chief executive. In the 2026 Scottish Parliament election, he was elected as a list MSP for South Scotland after placing third in Midlothian South, Tweeddale and Lauderdale. He stood for Lothian East at the 2024 United Kingdom general election.

He is the brother of historian and broadcaster Tessa Dunlop. He is descended from the Clan Dunlop through his grandfather the physician Sir Derrick Dunlop.
