= Dunlop =

Dunlop may refer to:

== Companies ==
- Name derived from John Boyd Dunlop (1840–1921)
  - Dunlop Rubber, British manufacturer of tyre and rubber products from 1889 to 1985
  - Dunlop Tyres, Japanese manufacturer of tyres since 1888
  - Dunlop Sport, a British brand of sporting goods
  - Dunlop Sport, a former Australian brand of sporting goods, now part of Japanese Sumitomo's division of SRI Sports
  - For other companies with the Dunlop name, see Dunlop (brands)
- Dunlop Manufacturing, also known as "Jim Dunlop", a U.S. music supplies company
- Dunlop Standard Aerospace Group, a former British industry alliance (currently as U.S. owned "Standard Aero")

== Places ==
- Dunlop, Australian Capital Territory, a suburb of Canberra, Australia
- Dunlop, East Ayrshire, a Scottish village
- Fort Dunlop, in Birmingham, England, once the main factory and head office of Dunlop Rubber
- Dunlop, Kolkata, neighbourhood in Baranagar, Kolkata
- Sahaganj, base of Dunlop India

== People ==
- Dunlop (surname)

== Other ==
- Dunlop valve, a valve stem still widely used on bicycle tires in many countries
- Dunlop cheese, made in Scotland
- Dunlop v. Bachowski, a United States Supreme Court case in administrative law

== See also ==
- Dunlap (disambiguation)
