= Dunlap (surname) =

Dunlap is an English surname; notable people with this name include:

- Adele Dunlap (1902–2017), American academic and nation's oldest living person
- Albert J. Dunlap (1937–2019), American businessman
- Benjamin B. Dunlap, American academic
- Bob "Slim" Dunlap (1951–2024), American musician, member of The Replacements
- Carla Dunlap-Kaan (born 1954), American female bodybuilder
- Charles Dunlap, birth name of Dunlap Exclusive
- Chris Dunlap (born 1985), American football player
- Clarence Dunlap (1908–2003), Canadian air marshal
- David Dunlap (1910–1994), American rower (eights), gold medal winner at the 1932 Olympics
- David L. Dunlap (1877–1954), American athlete and coach
- David W. Dunlap, American author and journalist
- Dawn Dunlap (born 1963), American actress (Laura)
- Ericka Dunlap, Miss Florida and Miss America
- Fred Dunlap (1859–1902), American baseball player
- Harriet Ball Dunlap (1867–1957), American social reformer
- Henry M. Dunlap (1853–1938), American farmer and politician
- John Dunlap (disambiguation), multiple people
- King Dunlap, American football player
- Nick Dunlap, American amateur golfer
- Robert H. Dunlap (1879–1931), United States Marine Corps general
- Robert P. Dunlap (1794–1859), governor of Maine 1834–1838
- Samuel Fales Dunlap (1825–1905), American lawyer and orientalist
- Tori Dunlap, American investor, feminist, and social media personality
- Victoria Dunlap (born 1989), American basketball player
- W. Barlow Dunlap (1856–1933), American lawyer, politician, and judge
- William Dunlap (1766–1839), American playwright
- William R. Dunlap, American artist, arts commentator and educator

== See also ==
- Dunlop (surname)
