= Emily Julian McManus =

Canadian poet (1858–1917)

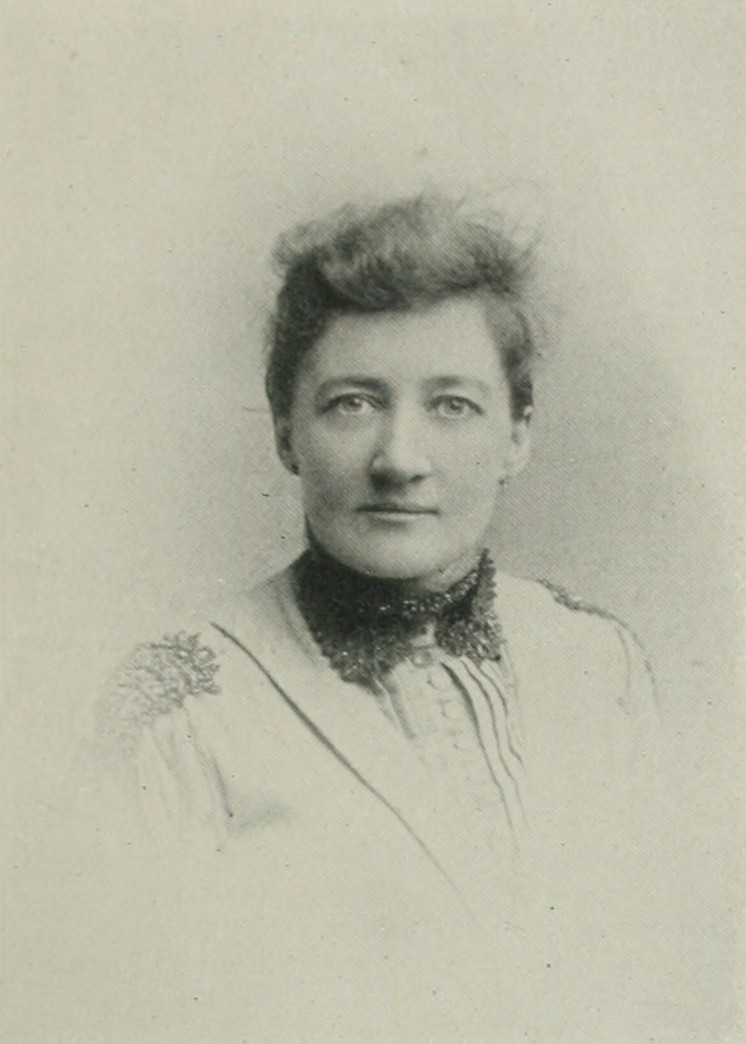
- Photo in A Woman of the Century
- Born: December 30, 1858; Bath, Canada West
- Died: September 21, 1917 (aged 58)
- Education: Kingston Collegiate and Vocational Institute; Ottawa Normal School; Queen's University at Kingston
- Occupations: poet; author; educator

Emily Julian McManus (30 December 1858 – 21 September 1917) was a Canadian poet, writer, and educator from Ontario. Some of her poems were reproduced in the collection of George William Ross, and some by William Douw Lighthall in Songs of the Great Dominion. McManus was the author of "Froney" (a prize story in the Toronto Week), "A Romance of Carleton", "The Thirteenth Temptation", and a novel, Old, Old Story.

== Early life and education ==
Emily Julian McManus was born in Bath, Canada West, on December 30, 1858. She was of Irish descent on both her father's and mother's side. Her parents were Patrick Teevan McManus (1814–1888) and Julia Ann (Koen) McManus (1826–1864).

McManus grew up an imaginative child, fond of the companionship of books, especially books of poetry. She obtained her early education in the public school of her native town. She attended the Kingston Collegiate and Vocational Institute and the Ottawa Normal School, being fitted to be a public-school teacher in the latter. After teaching for a period with marked success, she entered, in 1888, the arts department of Queen's University at Kingston (M.A., with First Class final honours in English Literature and Political Science, 1894).

== Career ==
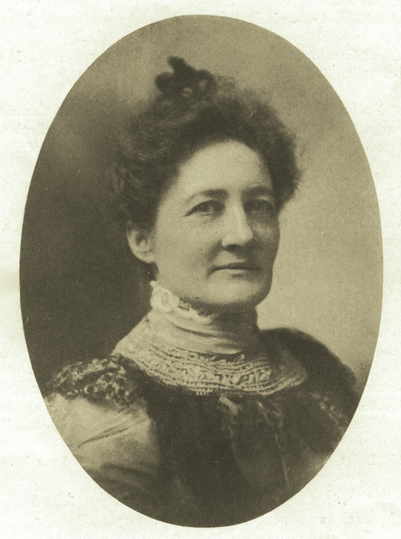
Photo in Vox Lycei, 1918

McManus was a literary reviewer for several years for the Free Press and the Ottawa Journal. She contributed short poems, sketches, and critical essays to various magazines, including the Kingston, Ontario Whig, the Toronto Globe, the Irish Canadian, the Educational Journal, Queen's College Journal, and the Toronto Week. She also contributed poems to Lighthall's Songs of the Great Dominion (Walter Scott, London, 1889); he made special mention of McManus' poem, "Manitoba," in his introduction to that work. Among the best known of her poetical pieces were "Gordon at Khartoum", "Manitoba", "Robert Browning", "Canada", "Drifting", "In April Weather", and "The Lady of Ponce de Leon".

McManus was a member of the Children's Flower Guild, Queen's Alumni Council of Ottawa, Women's Canadian Club, and the University Women's Club. She favored woman's suffrage.

== Death ==
Emily Julian McManus died at Ottawa, Ontario on September 21, 1917, aged 58, and was buried on Wolfe Island, Ontario.

== Selected works ==
=== Poems ===
- "Gordon at Khartoum"
- "Manitoba"
- "Robert Browning"
- "Canada"
- "Drifting"
- "In April Weather"
- "The Lady of Ponce de Leon"

=== Short stories ===
- "Froney"
- "A Romance of Carleton"
- "The Thirteenth Temptation"

=== Novels ===
- Old, Old Story
