= 1978 Calder Cup playoffs =

North American ice hockey tournament

Tournament details
- Dates: April 11 – May 15, 1978
- Teams: 6

Final positions
- Champions: Maine Mariners
- Runner-up: New Haven Nighthawks

The 1978 Calder Cup playoffs of the American Hockey League began on April 11, 1978. The top three teams from each division qualified for the playoffs. The two division winners earned byes for the Division Semifinals while the other two teams in each division played best-of-five series. The winners played best-of-seven series with the team that received the first round bye in their division. The winners of each Division Final played a best-of-seven series for the Calder Cup. The Calder Cup Final ended on May 15, 1978, with the Maine Mariners defeating the New Haven Nighthawks four games to one to win the Calder Cup for the first time in team history.

== Playoff seeds ==
After the 1977–78 AHL regular season, the top three teams from each division qualified for the playoffs. The Maine Mariners finished the regular season with the best overall record. The two division champions earned byes to the Division Finals.

=== Northern Division ===
1. Maine Mariners - 95 points
2. Nova Scotia Voyageurs - 90 points
3. Springfield Indians - 87 points

=== Southern Division ===
1. Rochester Americans - 93 points
2. New Haven Nighthawks - 87 points
3. Philadelphia Firebirds - 81 points

== Bracket ==
Division Semifinals
Northern Division
2	Nova Scotia	3
3	Springfield	1
Southern Division
2	New Haven	3
3	Philadelphia	1

Division Finals
1	Maine	4
2	Nova Scotia	3
1	Rochester	2
2	New Haven	4

Calder Cup Final
N1	Maine	4
S2	New Haven	1

In each round, the team that earned more points during the regular season receives home ice advantage, meaning they receive the "extra" game on home-ice if the series reaches the maximum number of games. There is no set series format due to arena scheduling conflicts and travel considerations.

== Division Semifinals ==
Note: Home team is listed first.

=== Byes ===
- Maine Mariners (Northern Division regular-season champions)
- Rochester Americans (Southern Division regular-season champions)

=== Northern Division ===
==== (2) Nova Scotia Voyageurs vs. (3) Springfield Indians ====
April 12	Nova Scotia Voyageurs	0 - 2	Springfield Indians

April 14	Nova Scotia Voyageurs	3 - 2	Springfield Indians

April 15	Springfield Indians	4 - 5	Nova Scotia Voyageurs

April 17	Springfield Indians	1 - 2	Nova Scotia Voyageurs

Nova Scotia won series 3 - 1

=== Southern Division ===
==== (2) New Haven Nighthawks vs. (3) Philadelphia Firebirds ====
April 11	New Haven Nighthawks	6 - 3	Philadelphia Firebirds

April 13	New Haven Nighthawks	7 - 1	Philadelphia Firebirds

April 14	Philadelphia Firebirds	4 - 1	New Haven Nighthawks

April 16	Philadelphia Firebirds	2 - 5	New Haven Nighthawks

New Haven won series 3 - 1

== Division Finals ==
=== Northern Division ===
==== (1) Maine Mariners vs. (2) Nova Scotia Voyageurs ====
April 20	Maine Mariners	7 - 5	Nova Scotia Voyageurs

April 23	Maine Mariners	5 - 7	Nova Scotia Voyageurs

April 26	Nova Scotia Voyageurs	6 - 4	Maine Mariners

April 28	Nova Scotia Voyageurs	0 - 3	Maine Mariners

April 30	Maine Mariners	4 - 2	Nova Scotia Voyageurs

May 1	Nova Scotia Voyageurs	7 - 1	Maine Mariners

May 3	Maine Mariners	2 - 1	Nova Scotia Voyageurs

Maine won series 4 - 3

=== Southern Division ===
==== (1) Rochester Americans vs. (2) New Haven Nighthawks ====
April 19	Rochester Americans	6 - 1	New Haven Nighthawks

April 20	New Haven Nighthawks	2 - 1	Rochester Americans

April 23	Rochester Americans	7 - 4	New Haven Nighthawks

April 25	New Haven Nighthawks	4 - 3	Rochester Americans

April 26	Rochester Americans	3 - 4	New Haven Nighthawks

April 28	New Haven Nighthawks	2 - 1	Rochester Americans

New Haven won series 4 - 2

== Calder Cup Final ==
=== (N1) Maine Mariners vs. (S2) New Haven Nighthawks ===
May 5	Maine Mariners	2 - 5	New Haven Nighthawks

May 7	Maine Mariners	4 - 1	New Haven Nighthawks

May 12	New Haven Nighthawks	4 - 8	Maine Mariners

May 14	New Haven Nighthawks	2 - 3	Maine Mariners

May 15	Maine Mariners	5 - 4	New Haven Nighthawks

Maine won series 4 - 1

== See also ==
- 1977–78 AHL season
- List of AHL seasons

Preceded by 1977 Calder Cup playoffs	Calder Cup playoffs 1978	Succeeded by 1979 Calder Cup playoffs
