= Ottawa Normal School =

Coordinates: 45.4200°N 75.6908°W

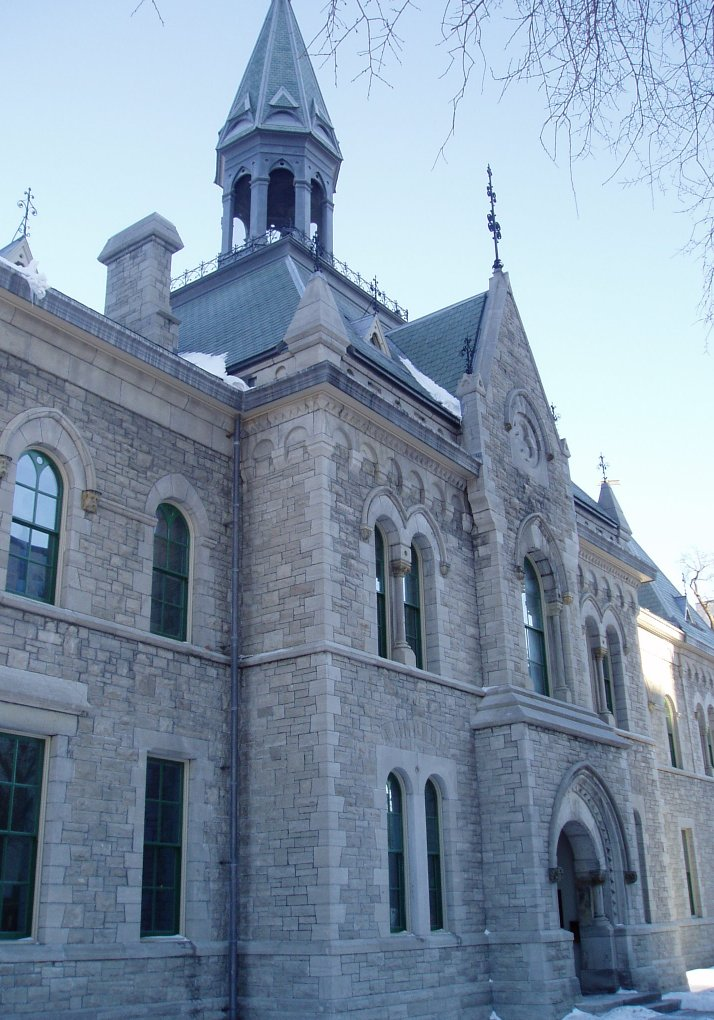
- The Heritage Building at 195 Elgin Street
- Type: Teacher's College
- Active: 1874–1986
- Location: Ottawa, Ontario, Canada

National Historic Site of Canada
- Official name: Former Ottawa Teacher's College
- Designated: 1974

The Heritage Building is today part of Ottawa City Hall. It was originally built in 1874 as Ottawa Normal School and served as a teacher's college. The Gothic Revival building stands at Elgin Street and Lisgar and several extensions were added to the rear of the building.

It was part of Ontario's normal school system of teacher's colleges that had been set up by Egerton Ryerson. When Ryerson's system was replaced by a more modern system it was renamed the Ottawa Teacher's College in 1953. In the 1960s it was decided that Ontario's teacher's colleges should be merged into universities and the teacher's college was merged into the Faculty of Education of the University of Ottawa in 1974. Four years later the building was closed and the building was sold to the federal government.

In 1986 it was purchased by the Regional Municipality of Ottawa-Carleton, to serve as part of a new RMOC headquarters. To the north of the college the main building of the new RMOC building was erected and links were created to the old school, which was re named the Heritage Building. With the creation of the new city of Ottawa in 2000 the building became part of Ottawa City Hall. The mayor has his office in this building, overlooking Elgin Street.

== Notable alumni ==
- Florence Dunlop (1896 – 1963), psychologist, teacher and pioneer in education for special needs children
- Emily Julian McManus (1865-1918), poet and educator

== See also ==
- List of designated heritage properties in Ottawa
