= Janette Dunlop =

British physicist, teacher

- Born: 10 March 1891; Edinburgh, Scotland
- Died: 8 May 1971 (aged 80); Edinburgh, Scotland
- Education: University of Edinburgh
- Occupations: Physicist, teacher
- Father: David M. Dunlop

Janette Gilchrist Dunlop (10 March 1891 – 8 May 1971) was a Scottish physicist who studied X-ray scattering. She later became a teacher and lived most of her life in Edinburgh.

== Life and research ==
Dunlop was born and raised in Edinburgh, Scotland, the daughter of hat maker David M Dunlop, who ran her grandfather David Dunlop's hat business in Edinburgh.

After graduating from George Watson's Ladies College, she studied physics at the University of Edinburgh graduating with honors in Mathematics and Natural Philosophy and with a bachelor's degree and a master's degree in 1914. Funded by a Carnegie Research Fellowship, she conducted research at the University of Edinburgh under the direction of physicist Charles Glover Barkla. She studied the scattering of X-rays by various substances and in 1916, she co-authored a published paper with Barkla, who won the Nobel Prize in Physics in 1917. The first sentence of that joint paper shows that Dunlop, "one of the writers," was an important contributor to the experimental work:

The results of experiments made by one of the writers on the radiation proceeding from substances containing only light elements when these were exposed to Röntgen radiation led to the conclusion that this radiation, as observed under ordinary experimental conditions, was almost purely a scattered X-radiation and that the scattering particles were not the ions or atoms, but the constituent electrons.

However, with the end of the First World War, teachers in Scotland were in short supply and, according to Fara, Dunlop's "research career was abruptly terminated when she was obliged to become a science teacher because of the national shortage." She trained at Moray House and the University of Edinburgh, and qualified as a teacher with honors in 1917. She went on to teach at two schools in Edinburgh, George Watson's Ladies College and George Heriot's School, and at another school in London.

She died in Edinburgh in 1971 at 80 years of age.

== Awards ==
- Dux of George Watson's Ladies College 1909
- Donald Fraser Scholarship from Edinburgh University
- Carnegie Research Scholarship following graduation

== Publication ==
- Barkla, Ch G., and Janette G. Dunlop. "XXX. Note on the scattering of X-rays and atomic structure." The London, Edinburgh, and Dublin Philosophical Magazine and Journal of Science 31.183 (1916): 222-232.
