= Tessa Dunlop =

Scottish historian and television presenter (born 1974)

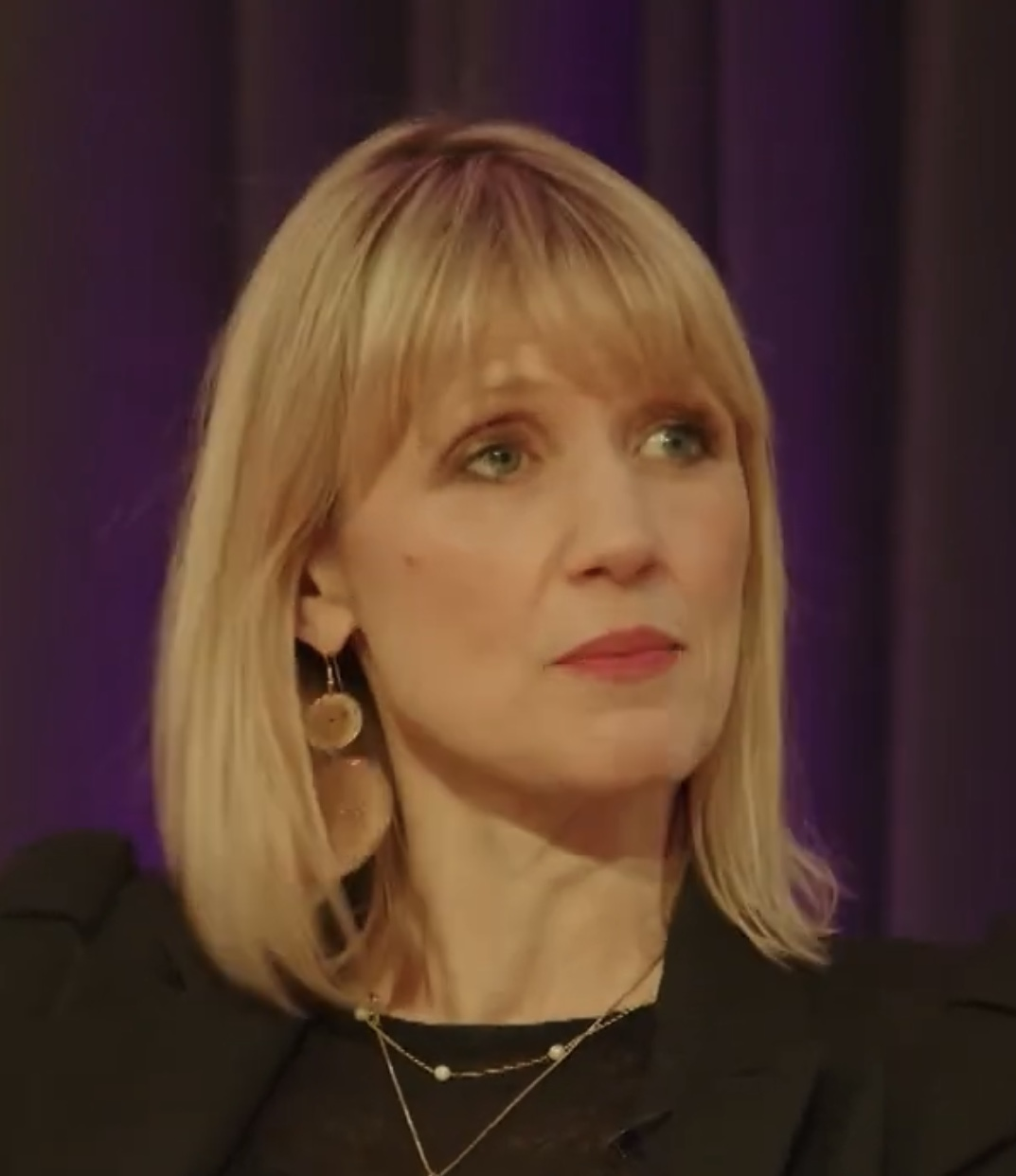
- Dunlop at the British Library in 2022
- Born: 1974 (age 51–52); Rannoch, Perthshire, Scotland
- Education: Pitlochry High School, Strathallan School
- Alma mater: St Hilda's College, Oxford (BA); Sheffield Hallam University (MA, PhD)
- Occupations: Historian, author, TV broadcaster
- Children: 2 daughters
- Parent: Donald Dunlop (1940–2009)
- Relatives: Duncan Dunlop (brother), Dunlop baronets
- Website: www.tessadunlop.com

Tessa Dunlop FRHistS (born 1974) is a Scottish historian and broadcaster.

She has written several history books based on oral history, and presented history programmes for the BBC, Channel 4, Discovery Channel, UKTV History and the History Channel.

== Background and education ==
Dunlop's father was Donald Henry Dunlop (1940–2009), only son of the physician Sir Derrick Dunlop.

After Pitlochry High School, Dunlop attended the private Strathallan School, another school in Perthshire, before reading history at St Hilda's College, Oxford, where she won the 1995 Gertrude Easton Prize for History. She then pursued further studies in Imperialism and Culture at Sheffield Hallam University graduating as MA, before receiving a PhD degree in 2020 for her thesis, Representations of Romania in British Public and Political Discourse, 1907–1919.

== Career ==
After university, Dunlop joined London radio station LBC, then BBC London 94.9.

In 2005, Dunlop was named Regional Television Personality in the Royal Television Society's West of England Awards for her work on the regional magazine show Inside Out West. In 2007, Dunlop filmed Paranormal Egypt, an eight-part series with Derek Acorah on location in Egypt. In 2011, she became one of the presenters in BBC2's BAFTA-winning Coast series, and she has since presented several history series.

Dunlop writes oral history books focused on women, war and the royal family. Titles include The Bletchley Girls, The Century Girls, (a Sunday Times best seller) and most recently Elizabeth and Philip and Army Girls.

The Century Girls: The Final Word from the Women Who've Lived the Past Hundred Years of British History (2018) describes, with quotations from interviews, the lives of six women born in or before 1918: Olive Gordon, Joyce Reynolds, Ann Bauer, Phyllis Ramsay, Helena Jones, Edna Cripps.

In March 2025, Dunlop launched the podcast Where Politics Meets History with LBC host Iain Dale.

== Personal life ==
In 2005, Dunlop married a Romanian; they live in London and have two daughters. She struggled to conceive and has written about her experiences with miscarriage and IVF.

Her brother, Duncan Dunlop, is a Scottish Liberal Democrat MSP for the South of Scotland region.

== Publications ==
- Lest we forget: War and Peace in 100 British Monuments, HarperNorth, 2025. ISBN 978-0008713140
- Elizabeth and Philip: A Story of Young Love, Marriage and Monarchy. London: Headline Press. 2022. ISBN 978-1035402441.
- Army Girls: The secrets and stories of military service from the final few women who fought in World War II. London: Headline Press. 2021. ISBN 978-1472282095.
- The Century Girls: The Final Word from the Women Who've Lived the Past Hundred Years of British History. London: Simon & Schuster. 2018. ISBN 978-1471161322.
- The Bletchley Girls: War, secrecy, love and loss: the women of Bletchley Park tell their story. London: Hodder & Stoughton. 2015. ISBN 978-1444795714.
- To Romania With Love. London: Quartet Books. 2012. ISBN 978-0704372573.
