= Andrew Dunlop, Baron Dunlop =

British politician and life peer

The Right Honourable The Lord Dunlop
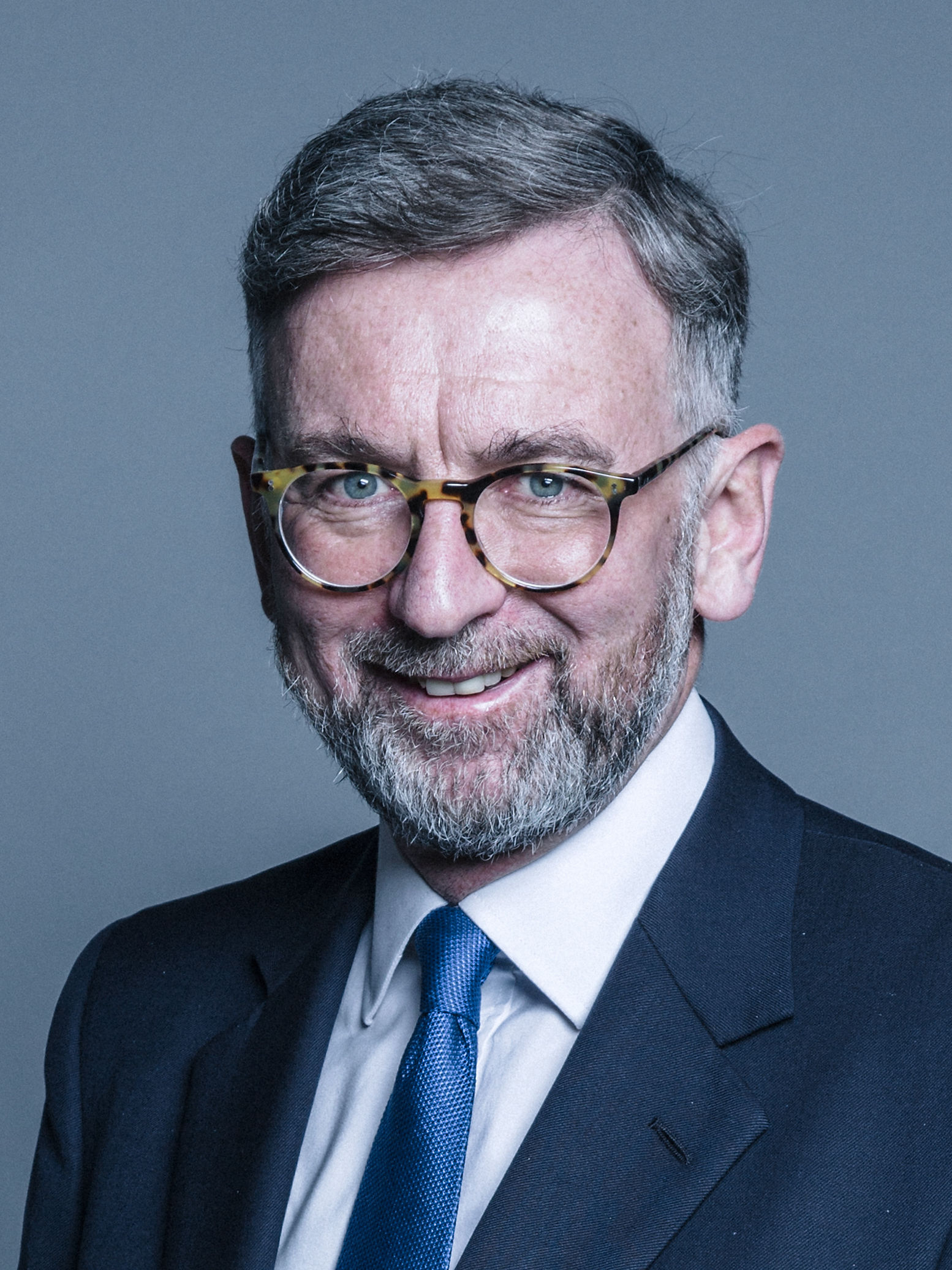

Parliamentary Under-Secretary of State for Scotland and Northern Ireland
- In office 11 May 2015 – 10 June 2017
- Monarch: Elizabeth II
- Prime Minister: David Cameron; Theresa May
- Preceded by: David Mundell
- Succeeded by: The Lord Duncan of Springbank (Scotland); The Lord Bourne of Aberystwyth (Northern Ireland)

Member of the House of Lords
- Lord Temporal
- Life peerage 26 May 2015 – 27 March 2026

Personal details
- Born: 21 June 1959 (age 67) Dunbartonshire
- Party: Conservative
- Spouse: Lucia Murfitt (m. 1991)
- Children: 3
- Education: University of Edinburgh

Andrew James Dunlop, Baron Dunlop (born 21 June 1959) is a British politician and life peer. From May 2015 to June 2017, he was the Under-Secretary of State for Scotland and Northern Ireland. He sits in the House of Lords on the Conservative benches.

== Education ==
Dunlop was born at Helensburgh in Dunbartonshire and went to school at Glenalmond College and The Glasgow Academy. He then read Politics and Economics at the University of Edinburgh under the tutorship of Professor John Mackintosh, formerly Labour MP for Berwick and East Lothian, graduating with an MA degree. He subsequently completed a Postgraduate Diploma in European Competition Law at King's College, London.

== Political career ==
Dunlop's first political job was as head of research for the Scottish Conservative Party from 1981 until 1984. He then joined the Conservative Research Department, first holding the Trade and Industry brief before becoming head of the political section.

He served as a special adviser to the Defence Secretary, then George Younger, in Margaret Thatcher's cabinet.

Dunlop worked at 10 Downing Street under Prime Minister of the United Kingdom Margaret Thatcher. He covered a range of policy areas during his stint in the No 10 Policy Unit including Scotland (a key policy development was the establishment of Scottish Enterprise), UK Defence procurement, employment and training policy.

In 2012, Dunlop was appointed chief adviser to Prime Minister David Cameron. He played a key role in devising the British Government's response to the Scottish Independence campaign.

Dunlop previously served as a Horsham District Councillor representing Cowfold, Shermanbury and West Grinstead Ward. Appointed Minister for Scotland on 26 May 2015 by David Cameron, he was created by Letters Patent as Baron Dunlop, of Helensburgh in the County of Dunbarton, being introduced to the House of Lords on 28 May 2015.

During his term as a minister for Scotland, Dunlop was tasked with promoting Scottish trade and investment, as well as the unofficial title of "Minister for Dundee", being tasked with promoting the regeneration of the city.

In 2019 Prime Minister Theresa May set up the Dunlop Review, a report led by Dunlop that said that a cabinet position for "intergovernmental and constitutional affairs" should be created to strengthen the Union.

== PR career ==
After leaving 10 Downing Street in 1991, Andrew Dunlop became managing director of leading lobbying firm Politics International, now part of European firm Interel, where he advised a range of corporate clients including Virgin, Airbus owner EADS and SAB Miller.

== Family and personal life ==
Andrew Dunlop married Lucia (née Murfitt) in 1991. The couple have three daughters and live at Jolesfield Partridge Green, near Horsham, West Sussex.

A great-grandson of Sir Thomas Dunlop Bt GBE, Lord Dunlop is in remainder to the family baronetcy and maintains close links with his Scottish relatives.

== See also ==
- Dunlop baronets

Orders of precedence in the United Kingdom
| Preceded by The Lord Hay of Ballyore | Gentlemen; Baron Dunlop | Followed by The Lord Maude of Horsham |
