= SS Queen Cristina (1901) =

British steam cargo ship

History

United Kingdom
- Name: Queen Cristina
- Namesake: Queen Cristina
- Owner: Thomas Dunlop & Sons
- Operator: Dunlop Steamship Co Ltd
- Builder: Northumberland Shipbuilding Co, Howdon
- Yard number: 89
- Launched: 6 March 1901
- Commissioned: 20 July 1901
- Home port: Glasgow
- Identification: UK Official Number 113966; Call sign SMBW
- Fate: Wrecked, 21 October 1907

General characteristics
- Type: Cargo ship
- Tonnage: 4,268 GRT; 2,804 NRT; 7,000 DWT
- Length: 360 ft 0 in (109.73 m)
- Beam: 48 ft 0 in (14.63 m)
- Depth: 20 ft 2 in (6.15 m)
- Installed power: 341 Nhp
- Propulsion: North Eastern Marine Engineering Co 3-cylinder triple expansion
- Speed: 10.0 knots (11.5 mph; 18.5 km/h)

Queen Cristina was a steam cargo ship built in 1901 by the Northumberland Shipbuilding Co of Newcastle for Thomas Dunlop & Sons of Glasgow. The ship was designed and built for general cargo trade and spent her career doing tramp trade. She was the second ship named Queen Cristina in service with the Queen Line.

== Design and construction ==
After the first steamship Queen Cristina wrecked on the Great Barrier Reef in 1899, Thomas Dunlop & Sons, owners of the Queen Line, ordered a new, bigger vessel to continue their Oriental trade. The vessel was laid down at the Northumberland Shipbuilding Company shipyard in Howdon and launched on 6 March 1901 (yard number 89). After successful completion of sea trials on July 20, during which the ship could easily attain a speed of 11.5 knots (13.2 mph; 21.3 km/h), Queen Cristina was handed over to her owners and sailed for New York. The vessel was built with a view to speed and fuel economy, and was primarily intended for general cargo trade, with several steam winches, and large number of cargo derricks installed to facilitate quick cargo loading and unloading process. In addition, the tween decks were designed to accommodate a large number of emigrants, troops or cattle in case of need.

As built, the ship was 360 feet 0 inches (109.73 m) long (between perpendiculars) and 48 feet 0 inches (14.63 m) abeam, a mean draft of 20 feet 2 inches (6.15 m). Queen Cristina was assessed at 4,268 GRT and 2,804 NRT and had deadweight of approximately 7,000. The vessel had a steel hull, and a single 341 nhp triple-expansion steam engine, with cylinders of 23 1/2-inch (60 cm), 39-inch (99 cm) and 66-inch (170 cm) diameter with a 45-inch (110 cm) stroke, that drove a single screw propeller, and moved the ship at up to 10.0 knots (11.5 mph; 18.5 km/h).

== Operational history ==
As soon as the ship was transferred to her owners, she departed in ballast for New York. There she loaded 162,424 cases of petroleum and sailed out for Shanghai via Colombo on August 29, 1901, reaching her destination on November 9. From China the steamer proceeded to Japan, where she loaded coal and delivered her cargo to Singapore on December 7, 1901. The ship left Singapore on December 26 for Calcutta to load a cargo of jute, and departed from India on January 25, 1902, for her return trip to the United States, reaching New York on March 15, 1902. The vessel then loaded approximately 165,000 cases of petroleum and left New York on April 19 for Yokohama. From Japan the vessel sailed on July 26 to Surabaya, where she was consigned to carry sugar back to the United States for the American Sugar Refining Company. Upon loading, the vessel departed Java on August 29 for her return voyage. On September 28 Queen Cristina arrived at Port Said with a damaged rudder and had to undergo repairs before continuing her trip three days later, arriving at New York on November 5 via Philadelphia.

Queen Cristina was subsequently chartered by the American & Australian Line to deliver general cargo to Australia, and departed New York on December 19, 1902. The ship called for coaling at St. Vincent and arrived at Adelaide on February 17, 1903, and from there continued to Melbourne, Sydney and Brisbane to unload her cargo, which consisted of a variety of items, including machinery, agricultural machinery, wire etc. Next, she was chartered to transport coal and sailed to Newcastle for loading. The vessel loaded 7,251 tons total (5,940 as cargo) of coal and sailed on March 20 for Manila, arriving there on April 13. The ship continued to Java to load a cargo of sugar and arrived in Philadelphia on August 27.

During the rest of 1903 through August 1905, Queen Cristina made several trips to Southeast Asia from New York and Philadelphia, carrying case oil and general cargo on her forward trips and returning with sugar and other agricultural products.

On September 12, 1905, the vessel arrived at Savannah from Philadelphia to load a cargo of cotton for Le Havre and Baltic ports in Germany, Sweden and Russia. The ship loaded 9,347 bales of cotton and left Savannah on September 23, arriving in Europe one month later. After unloading her cargo, she sailed back to the United States on November 23 from Hamburg via Barry and arrived at Pensacola on December 24, 1905. She departed Pensacola in ballast on January 17, and arrived the next day in New Orleans. There, the steamer took on board 200,915 bushels of corn in addition to cotton, lumber and foodstuffs and departed for Hull on February 7, 1906. The ship arrived at her destination on March 6.

Subsequently, the vessel sailed for Calcutta via Torrevieja and arrived at Port Said on May 21. On May 22, while proceeding down the Suez Canal, Queen Cristina struck an anchored steamer, SS Trafford Hall. The damage to both vessels was light, and Queen Cristina could continue her journey. Upon arrival at Calcutta she loaded 6,550 tons of manganese ore and left on August 18 for Baltimore. After an uneventful journey the ship arrived at her destination on October 4, bringing on board also two Cingalese young women to matriculate at the Folt Missionary College.

From Baltimore the steamer sailed for loading to Savannah. There she loaded 6,200 bales of cotton and departed on November 6 for Bremen via Norfolk, reaching it on November 28. Afterward the ship sailed to Rotterdam to load cargo for transportation to Chile via the ports on the west coast of South America, and departed for her voyage on January 6, 1907. After a long journey, the ship arrived at Antofagasta. Next, the ship was chartered by the "Commonwealth Line" for a period of 12 months to conduct trade between Australia and North America. Queen Cristina departed Antofagasta on June 6, stopped at Coronel and sailed for Australia on June 22, 1907. During her trip, the ship encountered some very rough weather, running into several gales, and had to put in at Auckland on August 5 short of coal. After refilling her bunkers, Queen Cristina left Auckland on August 10 bound for Sydney and reached it on August 18. There she was cleaned and painted on August 20 and then proceeded to Newcastle, arriving there on August 24 to refill her bunkers. Next, she returned to Sydney to take mail and load 5,100 tons of coal, and left on September 4 for San Francisco. the ship anchored at her destination on October 8 and upon unloading was immediately chartered to deliver grain from Portland to Europe.

=== Sinking ===
Queen Cristina sailed from San Francisco in ballast at 20:20 on October 19, 1907, bound for Portland to load wheat for delivery to Europe. The ship was under command of captain George R. Harris and had a crew of 31 men. After dropping off a pilot of the lightship, she took a northwestern course. After passing Cape Mendocino, the course was set for keeping about eight miles off St. George Reef Light, going at 8 knots. During the night of October 20 to the early morning of October 21, the vessel encountered heavy fog, and changed her course to a more northerly one while south of Crescent City. A strong current present near the coast carried the ship closer to the shore and at around 01:40 on October 21 Queen Cristina struck on North Seal Rock, about eight miles northwest of Crescent City, close to a place where another steamer, Brother Jonathan, had foundered earlier. The ship started to take on water immediately, and captain Harris ordered to lower the lifeboats; 16 men were able to board them around 07:30 and row towards Crescent City to seek help, reaching it at around 10:45.

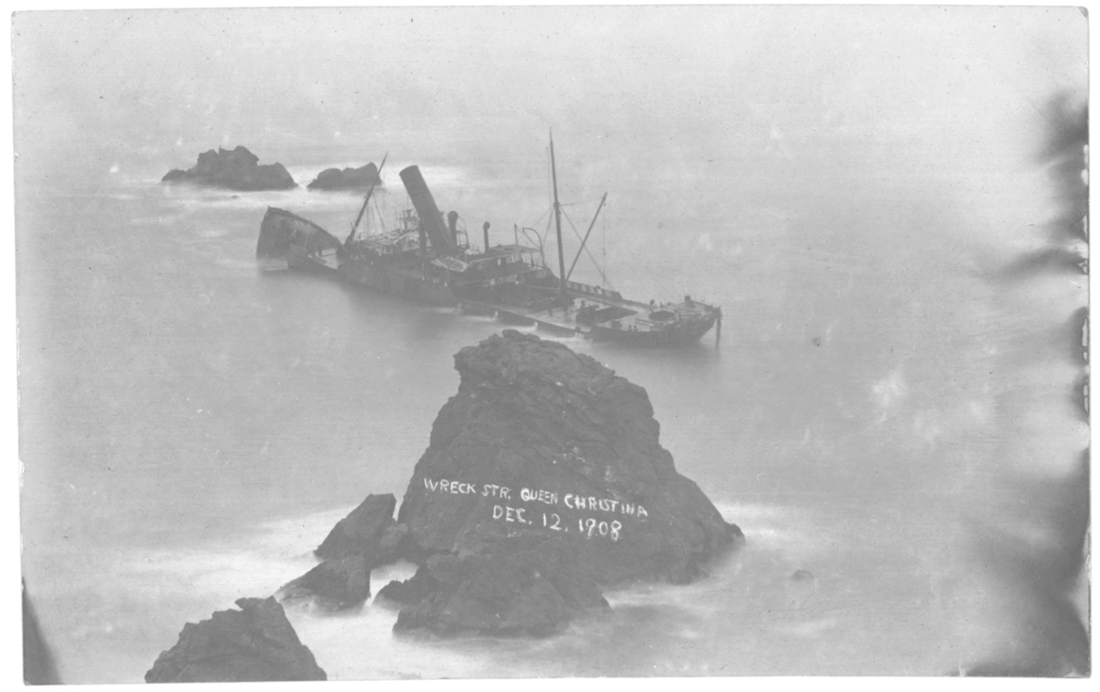
Queen Cristina's wreck shortly before sinking

The rest of the crew and the captain remained on board the ship. The pumps were kept going until around 10:00, when the rising water in the hold extinguished the fires. As the water reached between the decks, everyone remaining was forced to abandon ship at 12:30 and were subsequently found and picked up from the lifeboats by the steamer Navarro, which sailed from Crescent City upon hearing the news of the disaster. The captain and the crew stayed in Crescent City for about a week and were brought down to San Francisco by two steam schooners, Mandalay and Del Norte on November 1.

An investigation held at the British Consulate in San Francisco found that the vessel's compass developed a discrepancy of 14 degrees prior to departure, but given the adjustments made by the crew, the court decided this to be of no consequence. The court found that between 20:00 on October 20 and the time of grounding, no attempt was made to verify the course of the vessel or measure depth, despite the presence of the thick fog. Both the captain and the second mate were censured but did not lose their licenses.

The ship went aground at a place where she was surrounded by many submerged rocks. It was impossible to reach her, and the vessel was abandoned and declared a total wreck. Even though the wreck was in an exposed position open to southern and southwestern storms, Queen Cristina managed to survive the winter of 1907-08 and finally was broken and sunk in January 1909.
