= 1981 Calder Cup playoffs =

North American ice hockey tournament

Tournament details
- Dates: April 7 – May 20, 1981
- Teams: 8

Final positions
- Champions: Adirondack Red Wings
- Runners-up: Maine Mariners

The 1981 Calder Cup playoffs of the American Hockey League began on April 7, 1981. The eight teams that qualified played best-of-seven series for Division Semifinals and Division Finals. The division champions played a best-of-seven series for the Calder Cup. The Calder Cup Final ended on May 20, 1981, with the Adirondack Red Wings defeating the Maine Mariners four games to two to win the Calder Cup for the first time in team history.

Maine set an AHL record for the most goals allowed in one playoff with 81. What makes this more notable is that the AHL playoffs now consist of four rounds of best-of-7 series, whereas Maine set this record in only 20 games—where the playoffs consisted of only three rounds of best-of-7 series.

== Playoff seeds ==
After the 1980–81 AHL regular season, the top four teams from each division qualified for the playoffs. The Hershey Bears finished the regular season with the best overall record.

=== Northern Division ===
1. Maine Mariners - 97 points
2. New Brunswick Hawks - 84 points
3. Nova Scotia Voyageurs - 81 points
4. Springfield Indians - 73 points

=== Southern Division ===
1. Hershey Bears - 103 points
2. Adirondack Red Wings - 75 points
3. Binghamton Whalers - 70 points
4. New Haven Nighthawks - 69 points

== Bracket ==
Division Semifinals
1 | Maine | 4
4 | Springfield | 3
Northern Division
2 | New Brunswick | 4
3 | Nova Scotia | 2
1 | Hershey | 4
4 | New Haven | 0
Southern Division
2 | Adirondack | 4
3 | Binghamton | 2

Division Finals
1 | Maine | 4
2 | New Brunswick | 3
1 | Hershey | 2
2 | Adirondack | 4

Calder Cup Final
N1 | Maine | 2
S2 | Adirondack | 4

In each round, the team that earned more points during the regular season receives home ice advantage, meaning they receive the "extra" game on home-ice if the series reaches the maximum number of games. There is no set series format due to arena scheduling conflicts and travel considerations.

== Division Semifinals ==
Note 1: Home team is listed first.
Note 2: The number of overtime periods played (where applicable) is not indicated

=== Northern Division ===
==== (1) Maine Mariners vs. (4) Springfield Indians ====
| April 8 | Maine Mariners | 3 - 1 | Springfield Indians |

| April 10 | Maine Mariners | 7 - 2 | Springfield Indians |

| April 12 | Springfield Indians | 7 - 4 | Maine Mariners |

| April 15 | Springfield Indians | 10 - 3 | Maine Mariners |

| April 17 | Maine Mariners | 6 - 2 | Springfield Indians |

| April 18 | Springfield Indians | 9 - 2 | Maine Mariners |

| April 22 | Maine Mariners | 7 - 3 | Springfield Indians |

| Maine won series 4 - 3 |

==== (2) New Brunswick Hawks vs. (3) Nova Scotia Voyageurs ====
| April 7 | New Brunswick Hawks | 3 - 2 | Nova Scotia Voyageurs |

| April 9 | New Brunswick Hawks | 5 - 3 | Nova Scotia Voyageurs |

| April 11 | Nova Scotia Voyageurs | 3 - 6 | New Brunswick Hawks |

| April 12 | Nova Scotia Voyageurs | 4 - 2 | New Brunswick Hawks |

| April 15 | New Brunswick Hawks | 0 - 3 | Nova Scotia Voyageurs |

| April 17 | Nova Scotia Voyageurs | 1 - 2 | New Brunswick Hawks |

| New Brunswick won series 4 - 2 |

=== Southern Division ===
==== (1) Hershey Bears vs. (4) New Haven Nighthawks ====
| April 8 | Hershey Bears | 6 - 1 | New Haven Nighthawks |

| April 10 | New Haven Nighthawks | 2 - 6 | Hershey Bears |

| April 11 | Hershey Bears | 8 - 1 | New Haven Nighthawks |

| April 14 | New Haven Nighthawks | 2 - 3 | OT | Hershey Bears |

| Hershey won series 4 - 0 |

==== (2) Adirondack Red Wings vs. (3) Binghamton Whalers ====
| April 7 | Adirondack Red Wings | 3 - 5 | Binghamton Whalers |

| April 8 | Adirondack Red Wings | 6 - 3 | Binghamton Whalers |

| April 11 | Binghamton Whalers | 3 - 2 | Adirondack Red Wings |

| April 14 | Binghamton Whalers | 4 - 5 | Adirondack Red Wings |

| April 17 | Adirondack Red Wings | 3 - 1 | Binghamton Whalers |

| April 18 | Binghamton Whalers | 5 - 6 | OT | Adirondack Red Wings |

| Adirondack won series 4 - 2 |

== Division Finals ==
=== Northern Division ===
==== (1) Maine Mariners vs. (2) New Brunswick Hawks ====
| April 25 | Maine Mariners | 4 - 1 | New Brunswick Hawks |

| April 27 | Maine Mariners | 4 - 5 | OT | New Brunswick Hawks |

| April 29 | New Brunswick Hawks | 2 - 3 | OT | Maine Mariners |

| May 1 | New Brunswick Hawks | 6 - 2 | Maine Mariners |

| May 3 | Maine Mariners | 5 - 4 | OT | New Brunswick Hawks |

| May 6 | New Brunswick Hawks | 7 - 1 | Maine Mariners |

| May 8 | Maine Mariners | 4 - 3 | OT | New Brunswick Hawks |

| Maine won series 4 - 3 |

=== Southern Division ===
==== (1) Hershey Bears vs. (2) Adirondack Red Wings ====
| April 22 | Hershey Bears | 9 - 5 | Adirondack Red Wings |

| April 25 | Hershey Bears | 4 - 5 | Adirondack Red Wings |

| April 28 | Adirondack Red Wings | 0 - 1 | Hershey Bears |

| April 30 | Adirondack Red Wings | 7 - 4 | Hershey Bears |

| May 2 | Hershey Bears | 3 - 6 | Adirondack Red Wings |

| May 3 | Adirondack Red Wings | 6 - 3 | Hershey Bears |

| Adirondack won series 4 - 2 |

== Calder Cup Final ==
=== (N1) Maine Mariners vs. (S2) Adirondack Red Wings ===
| May 11 | Maine Mariners | 3 - 2 | Adirondack Red Wings |

| May 13 | Maine Mariners | 3 - 4 | Adirondack Red Wings |

| May 14 | Adirondack Red Wings | 1 - 0 | Maine Mariners |

| May 16 | Adirondack Red Wings | 1 - 10 | Maine Mariners |

| May 18 | Maine Mariners | 4 - 6 | Adirondack Red Wings |

| May 20 | Adirondack Red Wings | 5 - 2 | Maine Mariners |

| Adirondack won series 4 - 2 |

== See also ==
- 1980–81 AHL season
- List of AHL seasons

| Preceded by 1980 Calder Cup playoffs | Calder Cup playoffs 1981 | Succeeded by 1982 Calder Cup playoffs |
