= 1977–78 AHL season =

- League: American Hockey League
- Sport: Ice hockey

Regular season
- F. G. "Teddy" Oke Trophy: Maine Mariners
- Season MVP: Blake Dunlop
- Top scorer: Rick Adduono; Gord Brooks

Playoffs
- Champions: Maine Mariners
- Runners-up: New Haven Nighthawks

AHL seasons
- 1976–77 1978–79

The 1977–78 AHL season was the 42nd season of the American Hockey League. The season was in jeopardy when the last of the original eight franchises of the "International-American Hockey League", the Rhode Island Reds (previously Providence Reds) folded in the offseason, and the AHL was left with five teams. The league increased its member teams by four, when the North American Hockey League and Southern Hockey Leagues both folded before the 1977–78 season. Two teams joined from the NAHL, and another from the SHL, along with one expansion team.

North and south divisions were resumed. The F. G. "Teddy" Oke Trophy resumes as the regular season championship trophy for the north division, and the John D. Chick Trophy resumes as the regular season championship trophy for the south division. The Fred T. Hunt Memorial Award is first awarded to the player best exemplifying sportsmanship, determination and dedication to hockey.

Nine teams were scheduled to play 80 games each, however the Hampton Gulls folded on February 10, 1978, playing 46 games. The Maine Mariners finished first overall in the regular season, and won the Calder Cup championship as a first year expansion team.

== Team changes ==
- The Maine Mariners join the AHL as an expansion team, based in Portland, Maine, playing in the North Division.
- The Broome Dusters, of the defunct North American Hockey League, acquire and merge with the Rhode Island Reds. The Reds are relocated to Binghamton, New York, and play as the Binghamton Dusters in the North Division.
- The Philadelphia Firebirds, based in Philadelphia, Pennsylvania, transfer to the AHL as an expansion team, from the defunct North American Hockey League, and play in the South Division.
- The Hampton Gulls, based in Hampton, Virginia, transfer to the AHL as an expansion team, from the defunct Southern Hockey League, and play in the South Division.

== Final standings ==
Note: GP = Games played; W = Wins; L = Losses; T = Ties; GF = Goals for; GA = Goals against; Pts = Points;

North	GP	W	L	T	Pts	GF	GA
Maine Mariners (PHI)	80	43	28	9	95	305	256
Nova Scotia Voyageurs (MTL)	81	37	28	16	90	304	250
Springfield Indians (LAK)	81	39	33	9	87	348	350
Binghamton Dusters (PIT)	81	27	46	8	62	287	377

South	GP	W	L	T	Pts	GF	GA
Rochester Americans (BOS)	81	43	31	7	93	332	296
New Haven Nighthawks (NYR)	80	38	31	11	87	313	292
Philadelphia Firebirds	81	35	35	11	81	294	290
Hershey Bears (BUF/WSH)	81	27	44	10	64	281	324
Hampton Gulls^{†}	46	15	28	3	33	142	171

^{†}Suspended operations.

== Scoring leaders ==
Note: GP = Games played; G = Goals; A = Assists; Pts = Points; PIM = Penalty minutes

Player	Team	GP	G	A	Pts	PIM
Gord Brooks	Philadelphia Firebirds	81	42	56	98	40
Rick Adduono	Rochester Americans	76	38	60	98	34
Al Hill	Maine Mariners	80	32	59	91	118
Bob Collyard	Philadelphia Firebirds	79	28	62	90	42
Andre Peloffy	Springfield Indians	67	33	55	88	73
Gordie Clark	Rochester Americans	75	37	51	88	18
Joe Hardy	Binghamton Dusters	73	24	63	87	56
Tom Colley	New Haven Nighthawks	80	32	54	86	17
Charlie Simmer	Springfield Indians	75	42	41	83	100

- complete list

== Calder Cup playoffs ==
Division Semifinals
2	Nova Scotia	3
3	Springfield	1
2	New Haven	3
3	Philadelphia	1

Division Finals
1	Maine	4
2	Nova Scotia	3
1	Rochester	2
2	New Haven	4

Calder Cup Final
N1	Maine	4
S2	New Haven	1

== Trophy and award winners ==
Team awards

Calder Cup; Playoff champions:	Maine Mariners
F. G. "Teddy" Oke Trophy; Regular Season champions, North Division:	Maine Mariners
John D. Chick Trophy; Regular Season champions, South Division:	Rochester Americans

Individual awards

Les Cunningham Award; Most valuable player:	Blake Dunlop - Maine Mariners
John B. Sollenberger Trophy; Top point scorer:	Rick Adduono - Rochester Americans & Gord Brooks - Philadelphia Firebirds
Dudley "Red" Garrett Memorial Award; Rookie of the year:	Norm Dupont - Nova Scotia Voyageurs
Eddie Shore Award; Defenceman of the year:	Terry Murray - Maine Mariners
Harry "Hap" Holmes Memorial Award; Lowest goals against average:	Bob Holland & Maurice Barrette - Nova Scotia Voyageurs
Louis A.R. Pieri Memorial Award; Coach of the year:	Bob McCammon - Maine Mariners
Fred T. Hunt Memorial Award; Sportsmanship / Perseverance:	Blake Dunlop - Maine Mariners

Other awards

James C. Hendy Memorial Award; Most outstanding executive:	Sam Pollock
James H. Ellery Memorial Awards; Outstanding media coverage:	Brian Thayer, Maine, (newspaper); Al Kalter, Binghamton, (radio); Tim Melton, Hershey & Frank Fixaris, Maine, (television)

== See also ==
- List of AHL seasons

Preceded by 1976–77 AHL season	AHL seasons	Succeeded by 1978–79 AHL season
