= Sir Thomas Dunlop, 3rd Baronet =

Sir Thomas Dunlop, 3rd Baronet, OStJ (11 April 1912 – 18 August 1999) was a Scottish businessman.

== Life ==
Dunlop was educated at Kelvinside Academy, Craigflower Preparatory School, Shrewsbury School and St John's College, Cambridge. He qualified as a chartered accountant with McClelland Ker & Co and in 1938 became a partner in the family business, Thomas Dunlop & Sons, Shipowners and Insurance Brokers, founded in 1851. He was the fourth generation.

During the Second World War he served as a major with the Royal Signals in India and the United Kingdom. He returned to the family business and a succession of appointments in Glasgow.

During the 1950s he served as a director of Glasgow & Clyde Shipowners' Association, vice president of the Royal Alfred Seafarers' Society, honorary agent of The Shipwrecked Fishermen and Mariners' Royal Benevolent Society and chairman of the Underwriters' Association of Glasgow.

In 1955, he became Deacon of the Incorporation of Bakers of Glasgow and a director of the Merchant's House. In the 1960s he served as chairman of the Trustee Savings Bank of Glasgow. Dunlop retired from the family business in 1986.

In March 1965 he was appointed as an Officer of the Order of St John.

He succeeded as the third Baronet on the death of his father in 1963.

Baronetage of the United Kingdom
Preceded by Thomas Dunlop	Baronet (of Woodbourne); 1963–1999	Succeeded by Thomas Dunlop
