= 1980 Calder Cup playoffs =

North American ice hockey tournament

Tournament details
- Dates: April 8 – May 17, 1980
- Teams: 8

Final positions
- Champions: Hershey Bears
- Runner-up: New Brunswick Hawks

The 1980 Calder Cup playoffs of the American Hockey League began on April 8, 1980. The playoff format was expanded from six to eight teams. The eight teams that qualified played best-of-seven series for Division Semifinals and Division Finals. The division champions played a best-of-seven series for the Calder Cup. The Calder Cup Final ended on May 17, 1980, with the Hershey Bears defeating the New Brunswick Hawks four games to two to win the Calder Cup for the sixth time in team history.

== Playoff seeds ==
After the 1979–80 AHL regular season, the top four teams from each division qualified for the playoffs. The New Haven Nighthawks finished the regular season with the best overall record.

=== Northern Division ===
1. New Brunswick Hawks - 96 points
2. Nova Scotia Voyageurs - 93 points
3. Maine Mariners - 93 points
4. Adirondack Red Wings - 75 points

=== Southern Division ===
1. New Haven Nighthawks - 101 points
2. Hershey Bears - 76 points
3. Syracuse Firebirds - 69 points
4. Rochester Americans - 66 points

== Bracket ==
Division Semifinals
1	New Brunswick	4
4	Adirondack	1
Northern Division
2	Nova Scotia	2
3	Maine	4
1	New Haven	4
4	Rochester	0
Southern Division
2	Hershey	4
3	Syracuse	0

Division Finals
1	New Brunswick	4
3	Maine	2
1	New Haven	2
2	Hershey	4

Calder Cup Final
N1	New Brunswick	2
S2	Hershey	4

In each round, the team that earned more points during the regular season receives home ice advantage, meaning they receive the "extra" game on home-ice if the series reaches the maximum number of games. There is no set series format due to arena scheduling conflicts and travel considerations.

== Division Semifinals ==
Note 1: Home team is listed first.
Note 2: The number of overtime periods played (where applicable) is not indicated

=== Northern Division ===
==== (1) New Brunswick Hawks vs. (4) Adirondack Red Wings ====
April 8	New Brunswick Hawks	3 - 1	Adirondack Red Wings

April 9	New Brunswick Hawks	4 - 1	Adirondack Red Wings

April 11	Adirondack Red Wings	2 - 4	New Brunswick Hawks

April 13	Adirondack Red Wings	5 - 2	New Brunswick Hawks

April 14	New Brunswick Hawks	6 - 2	Adirondack Red Wings

New Brunswick won series 4 - 1

==== (2) Nova Scotia Voyageurs vs. (3) Maine Mariners ====
April 10	Nova Scotia Voyageurs	2 - 3	OT	Maine Mariners

April 12	Nova Scotia Voyageurs	3 - 2	Maine Mariners

April 15	Maine Mariners	7 - 0	Nova Scotia Voyageurs

April 17	Maine Mariners	6 - 5	OT	Nova Scotia Voyageurs

April 19	Nova Scotia Voyageurs	4 - 2	Maine Mariners

April 21	Maine Mariners	7 - 3	Nova Scotia Voyageurs

Maine won series 4 - 2

=== Southern Division ===
==== (1) New Haven Nighthawks vs. (4) Rochester Americans ====
April 8	New Haven Nighthawks	4 - 1	Rochester Americans

April 10	Rochester Americans	2 - 4	New Haven Nighthawks

April 12	New Haven Nighthawks	8 - 4	Rochester Americans

April 15	Rochester Americans	4 - 6	New Haven Nighthawks

New Haven won series 4 - 0

==== (2) Hershey Bears vs. (3) Syracuse Firebirds ====
April 8	Hershey Bears	5 - 3	Syracuse Firebirds

April 9	Syracuse Firebirds	3 - 5	Hershey Bears

April 12	Hershey Bears	8 - 1	Syracuse Firebirds

April 15	Syracuse Firebirds	3 - 5	Hershey Bears

Hershey won series 4 - 0

== Division Finals ==
=== Northern Division ===
==== (1) New Brunswick Hawks vs. (2) Maine Mariners ====
April 23	New Brunswick Hawks	3 - 2	OT	Maine Mariners

April 28	Maine Mariners	2 - 3	New Brunswick Hawks

April 30	New Brunswick Hawks	2 - 6	Maine Mariners

May 3	Maine Mariners	7 - 5	New Brunswick Hawks

May 4	New Brunswick Hawks	5 - 2	Maine Mariners

May 6	Maine Mariners	2 - 3	OT	New Brunswick Hawks

New Brunswick won series 4 - 2

=== Southern Division ===
==== (1) New Haven Nighthawks vs. (2) Hershey Bears ====
April 21	New Haven Nighthawks	3 - 5	Hershey Bears

April 23	Hershey Bears	7 - 3	New Haven Nighthawks

April 25	New Haven Nighthawks	10 - 3	Hershey Bears

April 26	Hershey Bears	1 - 3	New Haven Nighthawks

April 27	New Haven Nighthawks	4 - 5	Hershey Bears

April 30	Hershey Bears	4 - 3	New Haven Nighthawks

Hershey won series 4 - 2

== Calder Cup Final ==
=== (N1) New Brunswick Hawks vs. (S2) Hershey Bears ===
May 9	New Brunswick Hawks	3 - 5	Hershey Bears

May 10	New Brunswick Hawks	4 - 5	OT	Hershey Bears

May 12	Hershey Bears	3 - 6	New Brunswick Hawks

May 14	Hershey Bears	3 - 2	OT	New Brunswick Hawks

May 16	New Brunswick Hawks	4 - 2	Hershey Bears

May 17	Hershey Bears	7 - 4	New Brunswick Hawks

Hershey won series 4 - 2

== See also ==
- 1979–80 AHL season
- List of AHL seasons

Preceded by 1979 Calder Cup playoffs	Calder Cup playoffs 1980	Succeeded by 1981 Calder Cup playoffs
