= Ian Dunlop =

Ian Dunlop may refer to:

- Ian Dunlop (author) (born 1940), Scottish writer and art critic
- Ian Dunlop (filmmaker) (1927-2021), Australian documentary filmmaker
- Ian Dunlop (musician), bass player for 1960s band International Submarine Band
