= 1979 Calder Cup playoffs =

North American ice hockey tournament

Tournament details
- Dates: April 11 – May 11, 1979
- Teams: 6

Final positions
- Champions: Maine Mariners
- Runner-up: New Haven Nighthawks

The 1979 Calder Cup playoffs of the American Hockey League began on April 11, 1979. The top three teams from each division qualified for the playoffs. The two division winners earned byes for the Division Semifinals while the other two teams in each division played best-of-five series. The winners played best-of-seven series with the team that received the first round bye in their division. The winners of each Division Final played a best-of-seven series for the Calder Cup. The Calder Cup Final ended on May 11, 1979, with the Maine Mariners defeating the New Haven Nighthawks four games to zero to win the Calder Cup for the second consecutive year, and the third time in team history. Maine also beat new Haven in the 1978 Calder Cup Final.

In game three of the Southern division final, New Haven scored 15 goals against Binghamton to set an AHL record for most goals scored by one team in one playoff game.

== Playoff seeds ==
After the 1978–79 AHL regular season, the top three teams from each division qualified for the playoffs. The Maine Mariners finished the regular season with the best overall record for the second consecutive year. The two division champions earned byes to the Division Finals.

=== Northern Division ===
1. Maine Mariners - 103 points
2. New Brunswick Hawks - 92 points
3. Nova Scotia Voyageurs - 82 points

=== Southern Division ===
1. New Haven Nighthawks - 101 points
2. Hershey Bears - 78 points
3. Binghamton Dusters - 69 points

== Bracket ==
Division Semifinals
Northern Division
2	New Brunswick	2
3	Nova Scotia	3
Southern Division
2	Hershey	1
3	Binghamton	3

Division Finals
1	Maine	4
3	Nova Scotia	2
1	New Haven	4
3	Binghamton	2

Calder Cup Final
N1	Maine	4
S1	New Haven	0

In each round, the team that earned more points during the regular season receives home ice advantage, meaning they receive the "extra" game on home-ice if the series reaches the maximum number of games. There is no set series format due to arena scheduling conflicts and travel considerations.

== Division Semifinals ==
Note: Home team is listed first.

=== Byes ===
- Maine Mariners (Northern Division regular-season champions)
- New Haven Nighthawks (Southern Division regular-season champions)

=== Northern Division ===
==== (2) New Brunswick Hawks vs. (3) Nova Scotia Voyageurs ====
April 11	New Brunswick Hawks	5 - 4	Nova Scotia Voyageurs

April 12	Nova Scotia Voyageurs	5 - 4	OT	New Brunswick Hawks

April 14	New Brunswick Hawks	4 - 3	Nova Scotia Voyageurs

April 17	Nova Scotia Voyageurs	7 - 1	New Brunswick Hawks

April 19	New Brunswick Hawks	2 - 4	Nova Scotia Voyageurs

Nova Scotia won series 3 - 2

=== Southern Division ===
==== (2) Hershey Bears vs. (3) Binghamton Dusters ====
April 11	Hershey Bears	4 - 3	Binghamton Dusters

April 12	Binghamton Dusters	3 - 0	Hershey Bears

April 14	Hershey Bears	2 - 6	Binghamton Dusters

April 17	Binghamton Dusters	5 - 2	Hershey Bears

Binghamton won series 3 - 1

== Division Finals ==
=== Northern Division ===
==== (1) Maine Mariners vs. (3) Nova Scotia Voyageurs ====
April 22	Maine Mariners	7 - 2	Nova Scotia Voyageurs

April 24	Maine Mariners	4 - 1	Nova Scotia Voyageurs

April 27	Nova Scotia Voyageurs	7 - 5	Maine Mariners

April 28	Nova Scotia Voyageurs	2 - 5	Maine Mariners

April 30	Maine Mariners	2 - 3	Nova Scotia Voyageurs

May 2	Nova Scotia Voyageurs	3 - 5	Maine Mariners

Maine won series 4 - 2

=== Southern Division ===
==== (1) New Haven Nighthawks vs. (3) Binghamton Dusters ====
April 19	New Haven Nighthawks	4 - 2	Binghamton Dusters

April 20	Binghamton Dusters	3 - 2	New Haven Nighthawks

April 23	New Haven Nighthawks	15 - 1	Binghamton Dusters

April 25	Binghamton Dusters	1 - 6	New Haven Nighthawks

April 27	New Haven Nighthawks	3 - 4	Binghamton Dusters

April 29	Binghamton Dusters	3 - 7	New Haven Nighthawks

New Haven won series 4 - 2

== Calder Cup Final ==
=== (N1) Maine Mariners vs. (S1) New Haven Nighthawks ===
May 5	Maine Mariners	4 - 3	OT	New Haven Nighthawks

May 6	New Haven Nighthawks	3 - 5	Maine Mariners

May 9	Maine Mariners	5 - 2	New Haven Nighthawks

May 11	New Haven Nighthawks	4 - 8	Maine Mariners

Maine won series 4 - 0

== See also ==
- 1978–79 AHL season
- List of AHL seasons

Preceded by 1978 Calder Cup playoffs	Calder Cup playoffs 1979	Succeeded by 1980 Calder Cup playoffs
