= Dorrie Nossiter =

English jeweler (1893 – 1977)

- Born: 29 June 1893; Aston, United Kingdom
- Died: 1977
- Education: Municipal School of Art
- Occupation: Jewellery designer
- Spouse: Ernest Guy Robinson

Dorrie Nossiter (29 June 1893 – 1977) was an English jeweller and jewellery designer from Aston, near Birmingham.

Nossiter crafted bespoke jewellery in the English Arts and Crafts Tradition in both sterling silver and gold. Her designs are characterized by vibrant use of colour and floral motifs, with an emphasis on flowing, curved lines and gemstone embellishment. She was predominantly active during the 1930s.

Nossiter received her education at the Municipal School of Art in Birmingham, where she studied from 1910 to 1914. In 1922, she married Ernest Guy Robinson. By 1935, Nossiter had moved to London, where she exhibited in the "Art by Four Women" exhibition at Walker's Gallery, London. Nossiter would go on to exhibit her jewellery there from 1935 to 1939.

Nossiter's work is often confused with that of another female jeweller and jewellery designer of the same period, Sibyl Dunlop.
