= 1977 Calder Cup playoffs =

North American ice hockey tournament

Tournament details
- Dates: April 3–30, 1977
- Teams: 8

Final positions
- Champions: Nova Scotia Voyageurs
- Runner-up: Rochester Americans

The 1977 Calder Cup playoffs of the American Hockey League began on April 3, 1977. The top four teams in the league qualified for the playoffs and played best-of-seven series for Semifinals. The two winners played a best-of-seven series for the Calder Cup. The Calder Cup Final ended on April 30, 1977, with the Nova Scotia Voyageurs defeating the Rochester Americans four games to two to win the Calder Cup for second consecutive year, and the third time in team history. For the second consecutive year, the Voyageurs parent club, the Montreal Canadiens won the Stanley Cup in a four-game sweep over the Boston Bruins, making them the only pair of teams in history to win both the AHL's Calder Cup and NHL's Stanley Cup in the same season twice.

== Playoff seeds ==
After the 1976–77 AHL regular season, the top four teams in the league qualified for the playoffs. The Nova Scotia Voyageurs finished the regular season with the best overall record for the second straight season.

=== Overall ===
1. Nova Scotia Voyageurs - 110 points
2. New Haven Nighthawks - 92 points
3. Rochester Americans - 89 points
4. Hershey Bears - 78 points

== Bracket ==
Semifinals
1	Nova Scotia	4
4	Hershey	2
2	New Haven	2
3	Rochester	4

Calder Cup Final
1	Nova Scotia	4
3	Rochester	2

In each round, the team that earned more points during the regular season receives home ice advantage, meaning they receive the "extra" game on home-ice if the series reaches the maximum number of games. There is no set series format due to arena scheduling conflicts and travel considerations.

== Semifinals ==
Note 1: Home team is listed first.
Note 2: The number of overtime periods played (where applicable) is not indicated.

=== (1) Nova Scotia Voyageurs vs. (4) Hershey Bears ===
April 3	Nova Scotia Voyageurs	7 - 4	Hershey Bears

April 5	Nova Scotia Voyageurs	2 - 6	Hershey Bears

April 6	Hershey Bears	0 - 1	Nova Scotia Voyageurs

April 9	Hershey Bears	5 - 4	Nova Scotia Voyageurs

April 10	Nova Scotia Voyageurs	5 - 0	Hershey Bears

April 12	Hershey Bears	1 - 2	Nova Scotia Voyageurs

Nova Scotia won series 4 - 2

=== (2) New Haven Nighthawks vs. (3) Rochester Americans ===
April 2	New Haven Nighthawks	2 - 1	OT	Rochester Americans

April 3	Rochester Americans	3 - 5	New Haven Nighthawks

April 6	New Haven Nighthawks	2 - 5	Rochester Americans

April 8	Rochester Americans	6 - 3	New Haven Nighthawks

April 9	New Haven Nighthawks	4 - 6	Rochester Americans

April 10	Rochester Americans	5 - 4	New Haven Nighthawks

Rochester won series 4 - 2

== Calder Cup Final ==
=== (1) Nova Scotia Voyageurs vs. (3) Rochester Americans ===
April 18	Nova Scotia Voyageurs	3 - 4	Rochester Americans

April 20	Nova Scotia Voyageurs	5 - 1	Rochester Americans

April 22	Rochester Americans	3 - 2	Nova Scotia Voyageurs

April 24	Rochester Americans	3 - 5	Nova Scotia Voyageurs

April 27	Nova Scotia Voyageurs	3 - 1	Rochester Americans

April 30	Rochester Americans	3 - 4	Nova Scotia Voyageurs

Nova Scotia won series 4 - 2

== See also ==
- 1976–77 AHL season
- List of AHL seasons

Preceded by 1976 Calder Cup playoffs	Calder Cup playoffs 1977	Succeeded by 1978 Calder Cup playoffs
