= SS Queen Cristina (1896) =

19th c. English steam cargo ship

History

United Kingdom
- Name: Queen Cristina
- Namesake: Queen Cristina
- Owner: Thomas Dunlop & Sons
- Operator: Thomas Dunlop & Sons (1896-1899); Dunlop Steamship Co Ltd (1899)
- Builder: Bartram & Sons, Sunderland
- Yard number: 162
- Launched: 15 February 1896
- Sponsored by: Miss Buchanan
- Commissioned: 21 March 1896
- Home port: Glasgow
- Identification: UK Official Number 105985; Call sign PFWM
- Fate: Wrecked, 23 December 1899

General characteristics
- Type: Cargo ship
- Tonnage: 3,596 GRT; 2,291 NRT; 9,500 DWT
- Length: 344 ft 0 in (104.85 m)
- Beam: 45 ft 0 in (13.72 m)
- Depth: 18 ft 2 in (5.54 m)
- Installed power: 328 Nhp
- Propulsion: John Dickinson & Sons 3-cylinder triple expansion
- Speed: 12.0 knots (13.8 mph; 22.2 km/h)

Queen Cristina was a steam cargo ship built in 1896 by Bartram & Sons of Sunderland for Thomas Dunlop & Sons of Glasgow. The ship was designed and built for general cargo trade and spent her career doing tramp trade. She was named after Queen Cristina of Spain, and was the first ship named Queen Cristina in service with the Queen Line.

== Design and construction ==
In early 1890s Thomas Dunlop & Sons, following the success of their first two steamers SS Margaret and SS Queen Adelaide, ordered five new steamers of approximate 5,000 deadweight to expand their North American and Australian trade. Queen Cristina was the fourth of the series, and was laid down at Bartram & Sons' South Dock Yard in Sunderland and launched on 15 April 1896 (yard number 162), with Miss Buchanan of London being the sponsor. The ship was of the spar-deck type, and had a double bottom built on the cellular principle. She had six steel bulkheads and her decks were extra thick to protect against corrosion. Queen Cristina also had all the modern machinery fitted for quick loading and unloading of the cargo, including five powerful steam winches and a large number of derricks. The ceremony was attended by many dignitaries, including the owners of the company and the shipyard as well as the Spanish consul at Newcastle, Mr. Santamarina.

After successful completion of sea trials on 21 March 1896 the ship was transferred to her owners on the same day and immediately departed for Cardiff.

As built, the ship was 344 feet 0 inches (104.85 m) long (between perpendiculars) and 45 feet 0 inches (13.72 m) abeam, a depth of 18 feet 2 inches (5.54 m). Queen Cristina was assessed at 3,596 GRT and 2,291 NRT and had deadweight of approximately 9,500. The vessel had a steel hull, and a single 328 nhp triple-expansion steam engine, with cylinders of 24 1/2-inch (62 cm), 40-inch (100 cm) and 66-inch (170 cm) diameter with a 45-inch (110 cm) stroke, that drove a single screw propeller, and moved the ship at up to 12.0 knots (13.8 mph; 22.2 km/h).

== Operational history ==
Upon delivery Queen Cristina proceeded from Sunderland on 21 March to Cardiif to load her cargo. She sailed from Barry with a cargo of 4,500 tons of coal for Port Said on 28 March 1896 and arrived at her destination on 11 April. From Port Said the vessel sailed to Alexandria to load a cargo of seeds, grains and onions and left on 6 May arriving at Hull on 22 May, thus concluding her maiden journey.

The ship departed for next trip with a cargo of coal on 12 June from Cardiff and arrived at Aden on 2 July. She was then consigned to deliver a cargo of jute from India and continued to Calcutta. The vessel left there on 2 October and arrived at London on 8 November. She was then chartered for one trip to South America by the Houlder Line, and left Middlesbrough on 21 November 1896 via Antwerp and London. She reached Montevideo on 4 January 1897, continued to Buenos Aires taking on a cargo of agricultural products and left there on 2 February for her return trip, arriving at London on 5 March.

On her next trip, Queen Cristina arrived at Batoum on 13 April 1897 to load a cargo of 136,225 cases of oil and left on 21 April for Java. The ship arrived at Batavia on 26 May and unloaded 10,000 cases there, then sailed on to unload the rest of her cargo at ports of Indramaijoe (15,000 cases), Tagal (12,000), Soerabaja (60,000), Semarang (15,000) and Panaroekan (21,225). After unloading her cargo she sailed from Java on 19 July and arrived at Malta on 23 August. While en route, the ship was chartered to deliver cargo from New York to China, and sailed from Malta on 28 August for North America, reaching Boston on 22 September. The ship then proceeded to New York and after embarking her cargo of case oil left on 21 October. She coaled in Singapore on 12 December and continued to Shanghai. From Shanghai Queen Cristina sailed to Soerabaja and arrived there to load sugar on 31 January 1898. She continued to Probolinggo and afterwards sailed back to North America. She arrived at Philadelphia on 21 April to discharge 17,805 baskets of sugar consigned to the Spreckles Sugar Refining Co.

Queen Cristina was subsequently chartered by the American & Australian Line looking to pioneer a new trade route between New York and Australia. The steamer sailed to Baltimore on 5 May to load 2,000 tons of steel rails for delivery to Australia. Next, she proceeded to New York to complete loading general cargo, including 10,800 cases of kerosene, lumber, foodstuffs, 183 Vermont merino sheep and departed on 20 May. The ship arrived at Adelaide on 22 July and proceeded to visit the ports of Melbourne and Sydney. Upon discharging her cargo, she left Sydney on 11 August for Java via Newcastle, where she embarked 5,343 tons of coal. She arrived at Passaroean on 14 September and sailed back to North America with a cargo of 12,861 baskets and 5,753 bags of sugar on 9 October, reaching Philadelphia on 8 December. The steamer conducted one more trip on this route, leaving New York on 7 January 1899 and returning from Java on 22 August.

=== Sinking ===
Queen Cristina departed for her last journey on 17 September 1899 carrying 140,000 cases of refined petroleum for Shanghai. She passed through the Suez Canal on 15 October and arrived at Shanghai on 24 November. Upon discharging her cargo, the vessel sailed to Newcastle in water ballast on 4 December. The ship was under command of captain John Breaks and had a crew of 32, including the captain. The journey was uneventful until 22 December when the ship was in an approximate position 15°55′S 154°22′E, about 115 miles east off Lihou Reef. The course was set to SSE, however, the weather soon changed to a gale forcing the ship in the Southwest direction. At around 08:00 on 23 December the wind strength reached hurricane force, and the ship became uncontrollable. At about 17:00 breakers were noticed on the starboard side and an anchor was let go but did not hold. At about 17:30 on 23 December, Queen Cristina hit the Lihou Reef, and almost immediately was driven by a huge wave right on top of it. Water started filling the vessel, and the pumps were employed keeping the water in holds to a minimum. The weather somewhat subsided in the next two days and on 26 December the crew went around examining the vessel and found her to be in a critical position. After an attempt to refloat the ship failed, six crewmembers were sent in the captain's gig on 1 January 1900 to get assistance. They successfully reached Townsville a few days later, and steamer SS Barratta was dispatched to the crew's rescue reaching the wrecked steamer on 12 January. After taking on the entire crew and all the provisions and personal effects, Barratta left the reef and arrived in Townsville on 15 January. After examining the wreck, it was decided not to conduct any salvage operations due to difficult ship position.
