= Sibyl Dunlop =

British jewellery designer (1889–1968)

- Born: 1889; Hampstead, London
- Died: 20 December 1968
- Occupation: Jewellery designer

Sibyl Dunlop (1889 – 20 December 1968) was a British jewellery designer, best known for the jewellery and silver objects in the late Arts and Crafts style that she produced in the 1920s and 1930s.

Dunlop was born in Hampstead, London to Scottish parents and finished her schooling in Brussels, where she became interested in jewellery design and underwent some basic training. She established a workshop and shop at 69 Kensington Church Street, London W8, and in the early 1920s was joined by W. Nathanson as her principal craftsman. Dunlop's work is characterised by the use of semi-precious and precious gems, such as chalcedony, chrysoprase, moonstone, amethyst, agate, quartz and opals, often cabochon rather than facet-cut gemstones, set in silver in symmetrical patterns, often inspired by nature. One of her most famous designs is the 'Carpet of Gems' symmetrical setting. The gemstones were cut for Dunlop by lapidaries in Germany. Dunlop's work is often confused with that of another female jewellery designer of the same period, Dorrie Nossiter. The business closed at the outbreak of World War II in 1939 and Dunlop never returned to work due to ill health. After the war Nathanson re-started the business and continued producing jewellery and silver under Dunlop's name until he retired in 1971.
