= Frank Dunlop =

Frank Dunlop may refer to:

- Frank Dunlop (civil servant) (born 1947), Irish lobbyist, civil servant and broadcast journalist
- Frank Dunlop (director) (1927–2026), British theatre director
- Frank Dunlop (footballer) (1913–1991), Scottish footballer
- Frankie Dunlop (1928–2014), American jazz drummer
