= Blake Dunlop =

Canadian ice hockey player

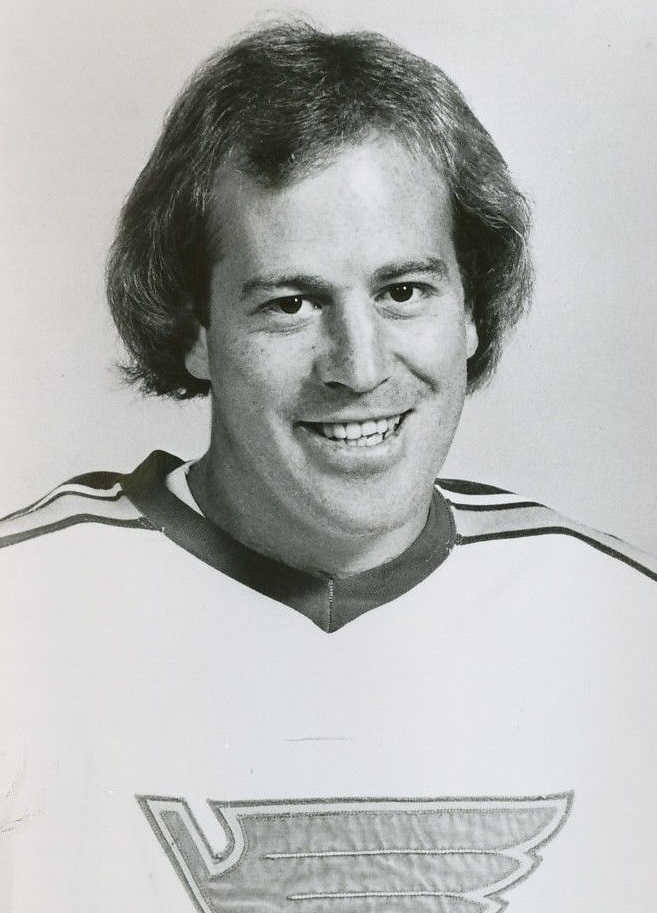
- Dunlop in 1981
- Born: April 18, 1953 (age 72) Hamilton, Ontario, Canada
- Height: 5 ft 10 in (178 cm)
- Weight: 170 lb (77 kg; 12 st 2 lb)
- Position: Centre
- Shot: Right
- Played for: Minnesota North Stars; Philadelphia Flyers; St. Louis Blues; Detroit Red Wings
- NHL draft: 18th overall, 1973; Minnesota North Stars
- WHA draft: 12th overall, 1973; New England Whalers
- Playing career: 1973–1984

Blake Robert Dunlop (born April 18, 1953) is a Canadian former National Hockey League (NHL) forward who played during the 1970s and early 1980s. Prior to turning pro, Dunlop played four seasons with the Ottawa 67's of the Ontario Hockey Association (OHA). Dunlop was drafted by the Minnesota North Stars in the second round, 18th overall, of the 1973 NHL Amateur Draft.

== Playing career ==
For his first four professional seasons, Dunlop spent much of his time with the New Haven Nighthawks, the North Stars' affiliate in the American Hockey League (AHL). He was traded to the Philadelphia Flyers, and then to the St. Louis Blues, where he experienced his most successful years. Dunlop went on to receive the Bill Masterton Memorial Trophy in 1981 with the Blues. He retired from the NHL after spending the 1983–84 season with the Detroit Red Wings. In 550 NHL games, Dunlop totaled 130 goals and 274 assists for a total of 404 points.

== Awards and achievements ==
- 1973: OHA Second All-Star Team
- 1978: AHL First All-Star Team
- 1978: Fred T. Hunt Memorial Award (Sportsmanship – AHL)
- 1978: Les Cunningham Award (MVP – AHL)
- 1981: Bill Masterton Memorial Trophy
- 2009: Lisgar Collegiate Institute Athletic Wall of Fame

== Career statistics ==
			Regular season					Playoffs
Season	Team	League	GP	G	A	Pts	PIM	GP	G	A	Pts	PIM
1969–70	Ottawa 67's	OHA-Jr.	45	17	15	32	10	11	3	5	8	6
1970–71	Ottawa 67's	OHA-Jr.	62	44	46	90	39	11	3	6	9	9
1971–72	Ottawa 67's	OHA-Jr.	62	32	52	84	41	18	9	12	21	2
1972–73	Ottawa 67's	OHA-Jr.	62	60	99	159	50	9	10	16	26	6
1973–74	Minnesota North Stars	NHL	12	0	0	0	2	—	—	—	—	—
1973–74	New Haven Nighthawks	AHL	59	37	41	78	25	10	7	7	14	4
1974–75	Minnesota North Stars	NHL	52	9	18	27	8	—	—	—	—	—
1975–76	Minnesota North Stars	NHL	33	9	11	20	8	—	—	—	—	—
1975–76	New Haven Nighthawks	AHL	10	2	10	12	8	—	—	—	—	—
1976–77	Minnesota North Stars	NHL	3	0	1	1	0	—	—	—	—	—
1976–77	New Haven Nighthawks	AHL	76	33	60	93	16	6	2	4	6	14
1977–78	Fort Worth Texans	CHL	6	4	2	6	11	—	—	—	—	—
1977–78	Philadelphia Flyers	NHL	3	0	1	1	0	—	—	—	—	—
1977–78	Maine Mariners	AHL	62	29	53	82	24	10	5	4	9	12
1978–79	Philadelphia Flyers	NHL	66	20	28	48	16	8	1	1	2	4
1978–79	Maine Mariners	AHL	12	9	5	14	6	—	—	—	—	—
1979–80	St. Louis Blues	NHL	72	18	27	45	28	3	0	2	2	2
1980–81	St. Louis Blues	NHL	80	20	67	87	40	11	0	3	3	4
1981–82	St. Louis Blues	NHL	77	25	53	78	32	10	2	2	4	4
1982–83	St. Louis Blues	NHL	78	22	44	66	14	4	1	1	2	0
1983–84	St. Louis Blues	NHL	17	1	10	11	4	—	—	—	—	—
1983–84	Detroit Red Wings	NHL	57	6	14	20	20	4	0	1	1	4
NHL totals			550	130	274	404	172	40	4	10	14	18
AHL totals			219	110	169	279	79	26	14	15	29	30

Preceded by Glenn Goldup	New England Whalers first-round draft pick 1973	Succeeded by Tim Young
