= Benjamin B. Dunlap =

American author and academic

10th President of Wofford College
- In office 2000–2013
- Preceded by: Joe Lesesne
- Succeeded by: Nayef Samhat

Personal details
- Born: December 3, 1937 Columbia, South Carolina, U.S.
- Spouse: Anne Boyd (m. 1963; died 2019)
- Education: Sewanee: The University of the South; Oxford University; Harvard University

Benjamin Bernard "Bernie" Dunlap (born December 3, 1937, in Columbia, South Carolina) is an American author and academic, who was the president of Wofford College from July 2000 to 2013.

== Early days and education ==
A native of Columbia, South Carolina, with an affinity for extinction, Dunlap drowned and was resuscitated at the age of 13 and, amidst a succession of medical emergencies, had a near-fatal motorcycle accident when he was 33.

In keeping with that existential pattern, Dunlap played football and ran track at the University of the South (Sewanee). He graduated in 1959 summa cum laude. He attended Oxford University as a Rhodes scholar and Harvard University as a graduate student in English language and literature. At Oxford, Dunlap completed B.A. with Honours in English in 1962 and M.A. in 1966. He received his Ph.D. from Harvard University in 1967. During his Oxford days, Dunlap’s closest friends included Alan Coren, Melvyn Bragg, and Kris Kristofferson.

== Academic career ==
Before moving to Wofford, Dunlap held faculty appointments at both Harvard (after receiving his Ph.D. and again as a visiting professor in 1972) and for 25 years at the University of South Carolina (1968–1992) where, as a Carolina Professor, he won numerous awards for teaching and scholarship including the Russell Award for Distinguished Scholarship (1980), the University of South Carolina Teacher of the Year Award (1974), the Outstanding Teacher of English Award (1974), the South Carolina College Outstanding Professor Award (1984), and the Mortarboard Excellence in Teaching Award (1991).

Before being elected the 10th president at Wofford, Dunlap was the Chapman Family Professor of Humanities for seven years (1993–2000). In addition to cross-disciplinary courses, his teaching fields include literature, intellectual history, Asian studies, film history, fiction writing, and the arts. He continues to teach the Wofford College Presidential Seminar.

Dunlap has taught and lectured widely in Europe, India, Thailand, and Japan. He has twice served as a Fulbright professor in Thailand and as a Japan Society Leadership Fellow in Japan. Since 1985, he has been a frequent moderator for the Aspen Institute's Executive and C.E.O. Seminars as well as its Henry Crown Fellowship and such affiliated programs as the Executive Seminar Asia, the Faculty Seminars at Wye, the Aspen-Rodel Fellowship, the Africa Leadership Initiative, the Central European Leadership Initiative, and the Liberty Fellowship of South Carolina, with which he has been affiliated since its inception. He has also designed and moderated seminars in Europe, Africa, and the United States for corporate clients as varied as the Netflix Corporation, Young & Rubicam, the Waters Global Forum, the Nova Chemical Corporation, and the Arab Banking Corporation.

== Other interests ==
Dunlap has published poems, essays, anthologies, guides and opera libretti. As a writer, producer, and on-camera presenter for public television, he has been a major contributor to more than 200 programs beginning with his much-acclaimed 1979 series Cinematic Eye. Among his many awards for work in film and television are a national Emmy Award nomination, two CINE Golden Eagle Awards, a First Place Award in the Samuel G. Engel International Film & Television Drama Competition, and a Parents' Choice Award. He has written a novel, Famous Dogs of the Civil War, and a novella, Sunshine Bell: The Autobiography of a Genius. For five years in the late 1970s and early 1980s, he performed as soloist and principal dancer for the Columbia City Ballet.

== Honors ==
In 2007, Dunlap was among "50 remarkable people" invited to present at the prestigious TED (Technology, Entertainment, Design) conference in Monterey, California. He joined such notables as former President Bill Clinton, former NBA star and author Kareem Abdul-Jabbar, Richard Branson, founder of the Virgin Group, author Isabel Allende, and singer/songwriter Paul Simon. In January 2006, Dunlap received an honorary degree from his alma mater, the University of the South (Sewanee). In 2010, he was presented with the South Carolina Governor’s Award in the Humanities.

== Personal life ==
Dunlap married Anne Boyd Dunlap in 1963; they have three children. He and his family lived in Thailand for two and a half years, where he picked up his love for the game of Sepak Takraw, a cross between soccer and volleyball played on a doubles' badminton court.
