= Robert Dunlop (disambiguation) =

Robert Dunlop (1960–2008) was a Northern Irish motorcycle racer

Robert or Bob Dunlop may also refer to

- Robert Graham Dunlop (1790–1841), British naval officer and office-holder in Upper Canada
- Robert Dunlop (historian) (1861–1930), English historian
- Robert Dunlop (Oklahoma politician) (1869–?), Oklahoma state treasurer
- Robert Dunlop (rugby union) (died 1935), Irish international rugby union player
- Bob Dunlop (boxer) (1945–2000), Australian boxer
- Bob Dunlop (footballer) (born 1935), Australian rules footballer
