= Thomas Dunlop (cricketer) =

Scottish cricketer

Personal information
- Full name: Thomas Charles Dunlop
- Born: 4 February 1878; Ayr, Ayrshire, Scotland
- Died: 13 August 1960 (aged 82); Ayr, Ayrshire, Scotland
- Batting: Right-handed
- Role: Wicket-keeper
- Relatives: George Dunlop (uncle)

Domestic team information
- Years: Team
- 1911: Scotland

Career statistics
Competition	First-class
Matches	1
Runs scored	0
Batting average	0.00
100s/50s	–/–
Top score	0
Catches/stumpings	–/2
- Source: Cricinfo, 6 July 2022

Sir Thomas Charles Dunlop TD DL (4 February 1878 – 13 August 1960) was a Scottish first-class cricketer and administrator, newspaper proprietor, and British Army officer.

The son of William Hamilton Dunlop, he was born at Ayr in February 1878. Dunlop was educated firstly at Bilton Grange and latterly at Eton College. In 1900, he succeeded his uncle, A. B. Gemmell, as the publisher of the Ayr Advertiser following his death, becoming the youngest newspaper proprietor in Scotland. In the same year that he inherited the Ayr Advertiser, he was commissioned into the British Army as a second lieutenant in the Ayrshire (Earl of Carrick's Own) Yeomanry, with promotion to lieutenant coming in October 1907. A club cricketer for Ayr Cricket Club, he made a single appearance in first-class cricket for Scotland against the touring Indians at Galashiels in 1911. Playing as a wicket-keeper in the match, he was dismissed without scoring by Jehangir Warden in the Scotland first innings and made two stumpings in the Indians first innings.

In the military, he was promoted to captain in June 1912. Dunlop served in the First World War with the Yeomanry, during which he was promoted to major in February 1917, with precedence to September 1916. In May 1917, he was decorated by Belgium with the Croix de guerre. Following the war, was decorated with the Territorial Decoration in May 1920. The following year he relinquished his commission. Dunlop served as president of the Scottish Cricket Union in 1922. By the late 1920s, Dunlop had returned to the Territorial Army and was promoted to lieutenant colonel in March 1928. He was appointed a deputy lieutenant of Ayrshire in May 1930 and an aide-de-camp to George V in June 1931. Dunlop retired from the Yeomanry in March 1932, having spent a period in command of a battalion as a brevet colonel, retaining his rank.

Dunlop mostly left the running of the Ayr Advertiser to his two long serving editors, Hugh Allan and Thomas Kay, and remained as its sole proprietor until 1938, when the newspaper became a limited company, with Dunlop and William Herbert Dunlop as its directors. During the Second World War, he was approved as an aide-de-camp to George VI. He was later Knighted for political and public service to Ayrshire in the 1955 Birthday Honours.

Dunlop died at Ayrshire in August 1960 and was succeeded as a director at the newspaper by his second son, William H. Dunlop.

His grandson is Ian Dunlop, a former writer and art critic for the Evening Standard. His uncle was the cricketer George Dunlop.
