= John Dunlap (disambiguation) =

John Dunlap (1747–1812) was an American printer.

John Dunlap may also refer to:

- John R. Dunlap (1857–1937), American journalist, editor and publisher
- John F. Dunlap (1922–2022), American politician in California
- John T. Dunlap (born 1957), grand master of the Sovereign Military Order of Malta
