= Charles Dunlop =

English cricketer (1870–1911)

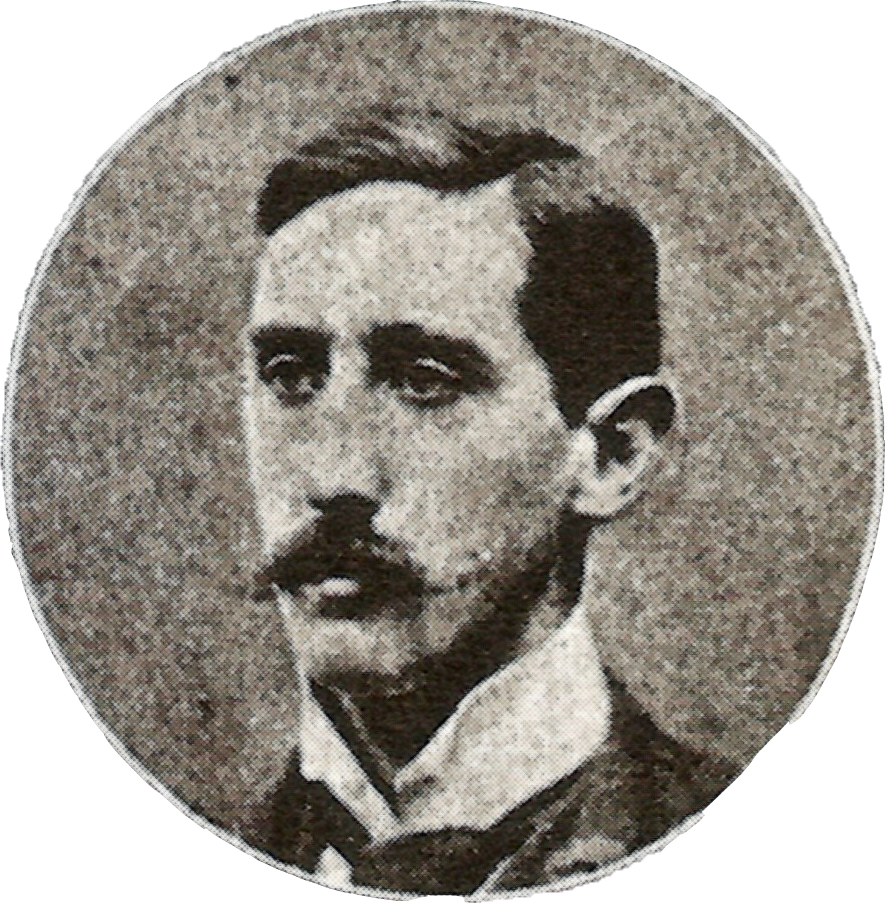

Personal information
- Full name: Charles Edward Dunlop
- Born: 25 June 1870; Edinburgh, Scotland
- Died: 21 August 1911 (aged 41); Kensington, London, England
- Batting: Right-handed
- Role: Batsman

Domestic team information
- Years: Team
- 1892–1905: Somerset
- First-class debut: 9 June 1892 Somerset v Oxford University
- Last First-class: 17 June 1905 Somerset v Sussex

Career statistics
Competition	First-class
Matches	43
Runs scored	1172
Batting average	16.50
100s/50s	–/5
Top score	65
Balls bowled	90
Wickets	2
Bowling average	20.50
5 wickets in innings	–
10 wickets in match	–
Best bowling	2/29
Catches/stumpings	20/–
- Source: CricketArchive, 4 July 2010

Charles Edward Dunlop (25 June 1870 – 21 August 1911) played first-class cricket for Somerset from 1892 to 1905. He was born at Edinburgh, Scotland and died at Kensington, London.

Dunlop was a middle to lower order right-handed batsman. He played for Somerset in around half a dozen matches in several seasons from 1892 onwards without ever being a regular player or a particularly prolific contributor to the county's run-getting. A history of Somerset cricket written 80 years after Dunlop's last appearance for the side said he was "played mainly for his enthusiastic fielding".

Dunlop was educated at Merchiston Castle School and at the University of Oxford, though he did not make any appearances for the Oxford cricket team.

His first first-class appearances for Somerset came in 1892: he played seven times that season, but made only 75 runs in these games. There was more success in fewer games in 1893, and he passed 50 in three innings, with a highest of 64 in the match against Gloucestershire at Taunton, when the bowling included two versions of W. G. Grace, both senior and junior.

The younger Grace was one of only two first-class bowling victims for Dunlop – the other was the Anglo-Australian Test player J. J. Ferris, both of them in the match against Gloucestershire at Bristol in 1894. This was the only first-class game in which Dunlop bowled more than a few balls, and his bowling style is not known, but in a minor match for Scotland against Lancashire in 1895, he opened the bowling with some success.

As a batsman, there were no 50s for Dunlop in first-class matches in 1894, but he returned to better form in 1895 and his aggregate of 282 runs for the season was his highest. Included in this was his highest first-class score, an innings of 65 when used as an opener for Somerset in a successful second innings run chase against Kent at Taunton.

After 1895, Dunlop's appearances for Somerset became more spasmodic and less successful. There were a few matches in 1897, then again in 1900, 1901 and 1902 and a final game in 1905, but in none of these seasons did he pass 50 again.
