= Rick Adduono =

Canadian ice hockey player and coach

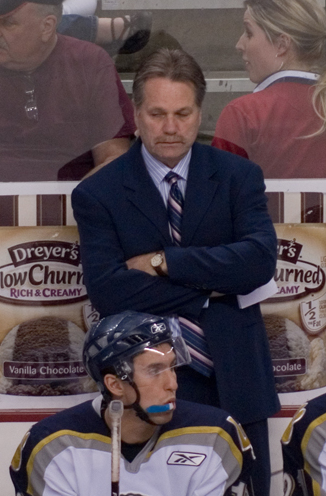
- Born: January 25, 1955 (age 71) Fort William, Ontario, Canada
- Height: 5 ft 11 in (180 cm)
- Weight: 182 lb (83 kg; 13 st 0 lb)
- Position: Centre
- Shot: Left
- Played for: Boston Bruins; Atlanta Flames; Klagenfurt AC
- NHL draft: 60th overall, 1975; Boston Bruins
- WHA draft: 27th overall, 1975; San Diego Mariners
- Playing career: 1975–1982

Richard Norman Adduono (ah-DOON-oh; born January 25, 1955) is a Canadian professional ice hockey coach and retired professional ice hockey player in the World Hockey Association and National Hockey League.

== Playing career ==
Rick Adduono was drafted by the Boston Bruins of the NHL in the 1975 NHL Amateur Draft and by the San Diego Mariners of the WHA in the 1975 WHA Amateur Draft. The Bruins took him in the fourth round, 60th overall, while the Mariners took him in the second round, 27th overall.

He began his short professional career by playing one game for the Boston Bruins in the 1975–76 NHL season. Adduono would not play in the big leagues again until the 1978–79 WHA season when he played a full 80 games for the Birmingham Bulls. He was quite productive in his only full season scoring 20 goals and 53 points. After the collapse of the WHA, Adduono went back to the NHL where he played three games for the Atlanta Flames.

== Coaching career ==
In 1990, Rick joined the coaching staff of the Thunder Bay Flyers of the United States Hockey League. He became head coach of the Flyers in 1993 and left the team in 1995 to coach professional minor league hockey. From 1995 to 1998, he served as the assistant coach for the South Carolina Stingrays of the ECHL. In 1998, he accepted the head coaching position for the Stingrays, leading them to their second Kelly Cup victory in 2001. Adduono left the Stingrays the following year. For 2002-2003 and 2003–2004, he coached the Greensboro Generals, leading them to a Kelly Cup playoff appearance in the 2002–2003 season.

Adduono was head coach of the Roanoke Valley Vipers of the United Hockey League. He resigned in September 2005 to pursue a higher paying job opportunity as a coach in the ECHL, and for the 2005–06 season, Adduono was the head coach of the Pensacola Ice Pilots.

In July 2006, he was named head coach of the Long Beach Ice Dogs of the ECHL. One year later, he signed a contract for the Iserlohn Roosters of the German Deutsche Eishockey Liga. After one year with the Roosters, he accepted the head coach position at fellow DEL side Krefeld Pinguine prior to the 2009–10 season. He guided the team to a second-place finish in the 2013-14 DEL regular season and was named DEL Coach of the Year. He stepped down from his position on November 3, 2015, but was named senior advisor.

== Career statistics ==
			Regular season					Playoffs
Season	Team	League	GP	G	A	Pts	PIM	GP	G	A	Pts	PIM
1972–73	St. Catharines Black Hawks	OHA	55	45	64	109	58	—	—	—	—	—
1973–74	St. Catharines Black Hawks	OHA	70	51	84	135	24	—	—	—	—	—
1974–75	St. Catharines Black Hawks	OMJHL	55	27	39	66	31	—	—	—	—	—
1975–76	Binghamton Dusters	NAHL	2	2	0	2	0	—	—	—	—	—
1975–76	Rochester Americans	AHL	68	11	23	34	24	7	2	1	3	7
1975–76	Boston Bruins	NHL	1	0	0	0	0	—	—	—	—	—
1976–77	Rochester Americans	AHL	77	29	45	74	38	8	3	1	4	2
1977–78	Rochester Americans	AHL	76	38	60	98	34	6	1	2	3	6
1978–79	Birmingham Bulls	WHA	80	20	33	53	67	—	—	—	—	—
1979–80	Birmingham Bulls	CHL	78	35	39	74	76	4	1	0	1	0
1979–80	Atlanta Flames	NHL	3	0	0	0	2	—	—	—	—	—
1980–81	New Haven Nighthawks	AHL	51	6	12	18	57	4	0	1	1	6
1980–81	Klagenfurt AC	Aus	7	4	5	9	4	—	—	—	—	—
1981–82	Fredericton Express	AHL	5	1	1	2	2	—	—	—	—	—
NHL totals			4	0	0	0	2	—	—	—	—	—
WHA totals			80	20	33	53	67	—	—	—	—	—
