= Douglas Dunlop =

Douglas Dunlop was a Scottish teacher and missionary who, during the British occupation of Egypt (1888–1922), controversially created what became known as the 'Dunlop-system' in Egyptian education. He was widely seen as an opponent of Egyptian nationalist aspirations in education.

From 1882 to 1922, Egypt was under British military occupation, and its government heavily under the influence (control) of the British Empire. The first Consul-General, Sir Evelyn Baring (later 1st Earl of Cromer), appointed Dunlop as British 'consultant' to the Egyptian Ministry of Education. Dunlop was suggested for this task by Cromer's former tennis partner.

Dunlop and the British had two concerns. Firstly, they were concerned with the debt-ridden Egyptian economy, and secondly with creating a suitable (and compliant) educated governing class and civil service, modelled on their experiences in British India. The education policy of the Egyptian government prior to the occupation had been to create a meritocratic system. Dunlop, on the other hand, oversaw the creation of an elitist two-tier system, with fees introduced for the elite schools. Modernisation also occurred, with elemental schooling being both centralised and expanded.

Prior to the British occupation, the administrative languages of Egypt had been French and Turkish. With British influence, English became the preferred language. This brought increasing controversy, as Egyptian nationalists sought to reassert Arabic. Dunlop, even after thirty years in Egypt, like Cromer, did not speak Arabic. He primarily promoted teaching in English, preferring to employ British teachers and attempting to marginalise teaching in Arabic and French.

In 1907, Saad Zaghlul (later revolutionary leader and post-independence prime minister) became Minister of Education. Zaghul strongly promoted Arabic in education, and necessarily locking horns with his British advisor. Dunlop became a figure associated with British resistance to Egyptian anti-colonialism. Dunlop resigned his post during the Egyptian revolution of 1919.

== See also ==
- History of Modern Egypt

== Sources ==
- Donald Malcolm Reid, Cairo University and the Making of Modern Egypt, (Cambridge: Cambridge University Press, 1990)
- Wilfrid Scawen Blunt, My Diaries, entries for 1906 (Columbia Electronic Encyclopedia, 6th ed)
- Al-Ahram Weekly On-line Archives
- Mona Russell, Competing Overlapping and Contradictory Agendas: Egyptian Education under British Occupation 1882–1922. Available in PDF
