= Ian Dunlop (author) =

Scottish writer and former art critic

- Born: 1940 (age 85–86)
- Occupation: writer

Ian Dunlop (born 1940) is a Scottish writer and former art critic for the Evening Standard. His first book, The Shock of the New, about seven historic exhibitions of modern art, was published in 1972. It was followed by books on Van Gogh, and on the life and art of Edgar Degas (1979). He has also written books and articles on contemporary American and British art and contributed reviews and art criticism to The Times, Studio International, Apollo, The Times Literary Supplement, and The Spectator.

Dunlop was born in Edinburgh, the eldest son of Commander Frederick Hamilton Dunlop, R.N., and the grandson of Sir Thomas Charles Dunlop of Doonside (1878–1960), sportsman, printer, and publisher of the Ayr Advertiser. He was educated at Eton College and then Trinity College, Dublin, where he read Mental and Moral Science. He now lives in London. In 2016, he published The Urban Fox, his first collection of poems.

Besides writing, Dunlop has worked as an art expert for Sotheby's, New York, and was Head of Contemporary Art for a while. He also worked as an art dealer and was a founder member of the Artis Group.

== Works ==
- 1965 The New Generation: 1965 introduction and notes to an exhibition of nine British sculptors at the Whitechapel Gallery, London
- 1971 Proust and Painting Proust 1871–1922, a Centennial Volume, edited by Peter Quennell, published by Weidenfeld & Nicolson.
- 1972 Cezanne Introduction to the English edition of The Complete Paintings of Cezanne, published by Weidenfeld & Nicolson.
- The Shock of the New, published by Weidenfeld & Nicolson.
- 1973 Van Gogh, published by Weidenfeld & Nicolson
- 1977 Edvard Munch, published by Thames and Hudson

Contributed to several journals and art magazines, including The Dubliner, Apollo, Studio International, Connoisseur, Books and Bookmen, The Spectator, The Times Literary Supplement, The Independent on Sunday, and The Times.

- 1979 Degas, published by Harper & Row and Phaidon
- 1987 Donald Sultan with Lynne Warren, catalogue introduction to an exhibition organised by the Museum of Contemporary Art, Chicago, and Published by Harry N Abrams.
- 1999 Golf, by Bernard Darwin. Foreword by Ian Dunlop, reprinted from the original 1954 edition by Ailsa Inc.
- 2001 Oxford Companion to Western Art, ed. Brigstocke, entry on Exhibitions. Published by Oxford University Press.
- 2016 The Urban Fox, published by Paekariki Press, Walthamstow, 2016.
