= Florence Dunlop =

Canadian psychologist and educator

Florence Sara Dunlop (1896 in Rideau View, Ontario – 1963 in Ottawa) was a Canadian psychologist, teacher and pioneer in education for special needs children. She was one of the first teachers hired in the Department of Psychology at Carleton University, and one of the founders and the president of the International Council for Exceptional Children.

== Early life and education ==
Dunlop was born in Rideau View, Ontario, in 1896. She attended Ottawa Normal school, graduating in 1916. After graduation, she started teaching in nearby rural areas, then went to study at Queen's University, receiving a bachelor's degree in 1924 and master's degree in 1931, PhD in psychology from Teachers College, Columbia University in 1935.

== Career ==
In the early 1920s, Dunlop entered a one-year exchange-teacher program in London, followed by travels to South Africa, Australia and New Zealand where she visited schools and studied programs for students with special needs. She was employed as a psychologist by the Ottawa Public School Board where she was the supervisor of special education from 1927 until 1961. She was among the founders of the Carleton University in Ottawa, where she lectured from 1942 to 1945. From July 1945 until May 1947, she was the president of the International Council for Exceptional Children. For fifteen summers, she taught at the Columbia University.

In 1960, President Dwight D. Eisenhower invited Dunlop to attend the 1960 White House Conference on Children and Youth. At the age of 65, she accepted a post of the professor at San Francisco State College but, in 1962, illness forced her to return to Ottawa.

Florence Dunlop died in Ottawa in 1963.

== Commemoration ==
- Dunlop Public School opened in 1970 in Ottawa.
- Florence Dunlop Scholarship, established in 2014 and awarded annually on the recommendation of the chair of the Carleton Department of Psychology to an outstanding student proceeding from second-year to third-year in a Bachelor of Arts in psychology.

== Works ==
- Subsequent careers of non-academic boys (a dissertation), New York: Teachers College, Columbia University, 1935
- Child psychology, Ottawa: Canadian Legion Educational Services, 1945
- "Analysis of Data Obtained from Ten Years of Intelligence Testing in the Ottawa Public Schools", Canadian Journal of Psychology, 1, 1 (May 1947), pp. 87–91
