= James Dunlop (rugby union) =

Scotland international rugby union player

- Born: James William Dunlop; 16 October 1854 Coatbridge, Scotland
- Died: 20 November 1923 (aged 69) St Boswells, Scotland
- School: Cheltenham College

Rugby union career
- Position: Forward
Amateur team(s)
Years	Team	Apps	(Points)
-	West of Scotland		
International career
Years	Team	Apps	(Points)
1875	Scotland	1	(0)

Colonel James Dunlop (1854–1923) was a Scotland international rugby football player.

== Rugby Union career ==
=== Amateur career ===
Dunlop played for West of Scotland.

=== International career ===
He was capped once for Scotland on 8 March 1875.

== Military career ==
Dunlop was in the Royal Horse Artillery, entering the army in 1875. He rose through the ranks:- Captain in 1884; Major in 1892; Lieutenant - Colonel in 1900; and finally Colonel in 1904. He took part in the Second Anglo-Afghan War in 1879–80; the Third Anglo-Burmese War in 1886–87; and the Second Boer War in 1901–02.

== Family ==
Dunlop was unmarried.

He was half-brother to Colin Dunlop of Lockerbie House, Dumfriesshire. His father was Colin Robert Dunlop of Fullarton House, Lanarkshire. His mother, Ann Maxwell Black, was a daughter of James Black of Craigmaddie.

His ancestors included John Dunlop of Garnkirk, Cadder who was a burgess of Glasgow in 1631. Dunlop of Garnkirk's brother received a baronetcy, now extinct. Another ancestor was Colin Dunlop of Carmyle, who was Provost of Glasgow in 1770. Dunlop of Carmyle's grandson was Colin Dunlop of Tollcross, M.P. for Glasgow in 1835.
