= John Gibb Dunlop =

Scottish engineer & shipbuilder (1844–1913)

John Gibb Dunlop (1844–1913) was a Scottish engineer and shipbuilder who ran John Brown Shipbuilders for many years. He is best remembered as the person in charge of the building of the ill-fated RMS Lusitania and the renowned RMS Aquitania.

== Life ==
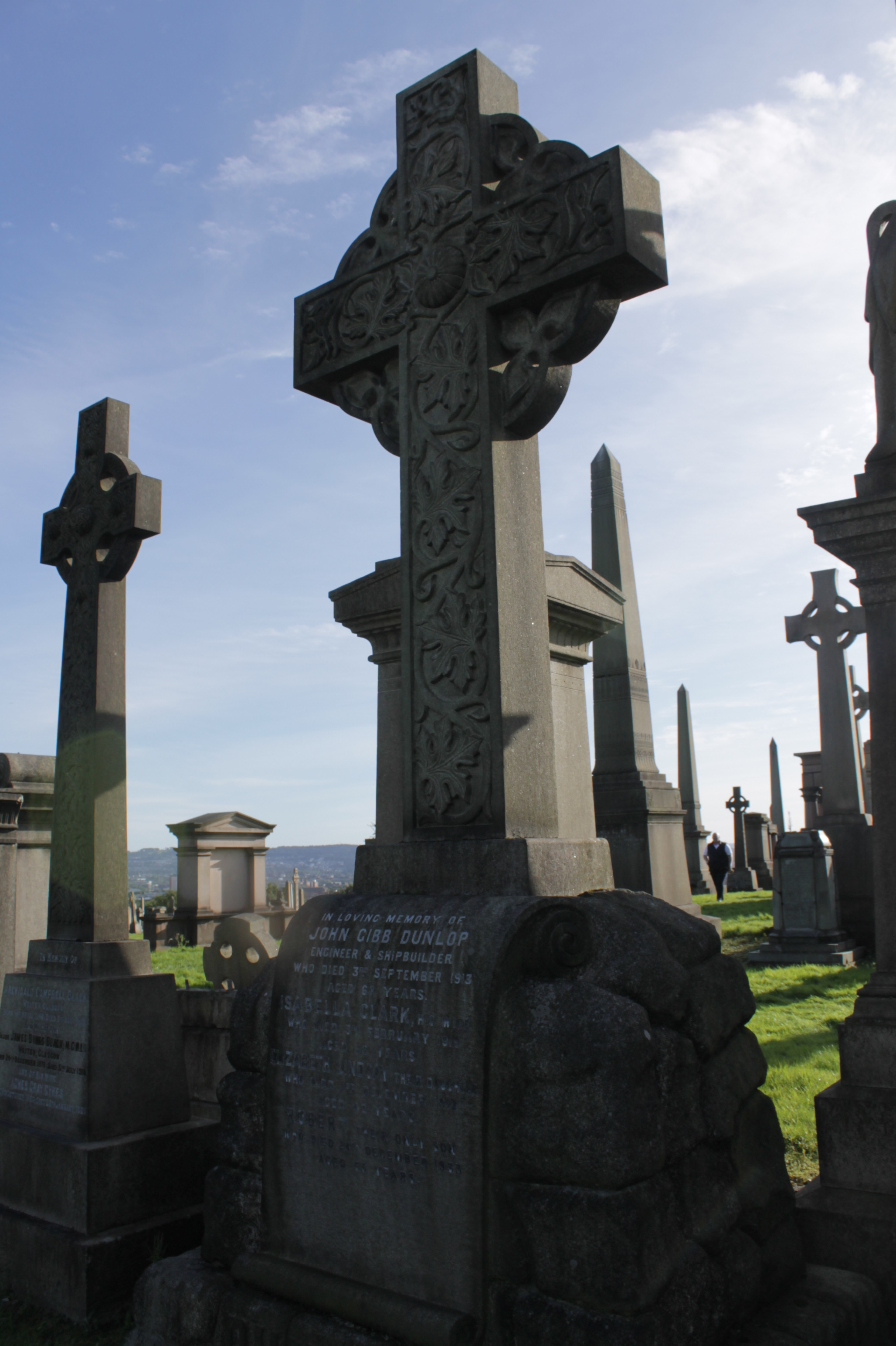
The grave of John Gibb Dunlop, Glasgow Necropolis

He was born in Polmont near Falkirk on 28 September 1844, the second son of Robert Dunlop (b.1819) a farmer, and his wife Mary Gibb. In the 1861 they were living at Claret farmhouse near Polmont.

Around 1862 he was apprenticed to Randolph, Elder & Company, shipbuilders in Glasgow. He was with the company in 1864 when they founded the Fairfield Shipbuilding and Engineering Company.

Around 1879 he left Fairfield and joined the Orient Line in London as Superintendent Engineer. Hs family lived at 115 Edwards Road in Hackney.

In 1887 he returned to Scotland to work for J & G Thomson at Clydebank. He was then living at Scotstownhill in Renfrewshire.

In 1895 Thomson's yard was taken over by John Brown & Co. Here he rose rapidly, becoming Director in 1899. As John Brown had not previously undertaken shipbuilding, his presence was now critical, and as senior engineer he would have had a control over all ship design thereafter. This led to a major expansion along the banks of the River Clyde.

At the beginning of the 20th century he was living at 12 Crown Terrace in Govan.

In 1907 he was a controlling influence of the acquisition of a majority share in Harland and Wolff shipyard in Belfast. In this role he may have had some influence on the design of Titanic

He retired to Brighton in 1911.

He died in Glasgow on 13 September 1913. He is buried in Glasgow Necropolis. The grave lies in the north-east section of the upper plateau.

== Family ==
In July 1875 at Stobhill he was married to Isabella Clark (1852-1919). They had one son and three daughters.

== Notable ships under his design ==
In this capacity Dunlop acted as the enabler of "master-plans" by naval architects such as Leonard Peskett who worked for Cunard, bringing a design concept to reality. Dunlop would be the specifier of the physical structure and co-ordinator of all detailed design.

- RMS Saxonia (1899)
- SS Vaderland (1900)
- SS Zeeland (1901)
- HMS Bacchante (1901)
- HMS Leviathan (1901)
- RMS Lusitania (1906) for the Cunard Line torpedoed in 1915
- HMS Inflexible (1907)
- SS Munich (1908)
- HMS Foxhound (1909)
- SS Orsova (1909)
- PS Golden Eagle (1909)
- HMS Acorn (1910)
- HMS Hind (1911)
- HMAS Australia (1911)
- HMS Hydra (1912)
- RMS Aquitania (1914)
- HMS Milne (1914)
- HMS Medusa (1915)
- HMS Ossory (1915)
