= John B. Dunlop =

American political scientist (1942–2023)

John Barrett Dunlop (1942–2023) was an American political scientist, an emeritus senior fellow at the Hoover Institution, and an expert on Soviet and Russian politics activefrom the 1980s to 2023.

He held a Bachelor's degree and graduated magna cum laude from Harvard University. He received his master's and doctoral degrees from Yale University. He then was a National Fellow at the Hoover Institution from 1978 to 1979.

== Books ==
- 2018: (With Vladimir Kara-Murza) The February 2015 Assassination of Boris Nemtsov and the Flawed Trial of His Alleged Killers
- 2017: Exodus: St. John Maximovitch Leads His Flock Out of Shanghai
- 2012: The Moscow Bombings of September 1999: Examinations of Russian Terrorist Attacks at the Onset of Vladimir Putin's Rule
- 2006: The 2002 Dubrovka and 2004 Beslan Hostage Crises: a Critique of Russian Counter-Terrorism
- 1998: Russia Confronts Chechnya: Roots of a Separatist Conflict
- 1993: The Rise of Russia and the Fall of the Soviet Union
- 1985: The New Russian Nationalism
- 1983: The Faces of Contemporary Russian Nationalism
- 1976: New Russian Revolutionaries
- 1972: Staretz Amvrosy, Model for Dostoevsky's Staretz Zossima
