= John T. Dunlop (Virginia politician) =

American politician

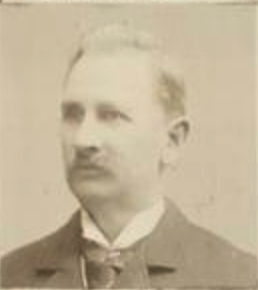

Member of the Virginia House of Delegates from Rockbridge County
- In office December 2, 1891 – December 6, 1893 Serving with Greenlee D. Letcher
- Preceded by: James M. Johnston
- Succeeded by: James K. Edmondson

Personal details
- Born: John Thomas Dunlop; January 25, 1842 Frederick County, Maryland, U.S.
- Died: March 25, 1907 (aged 65) Rockbridge County, Virginia, U.S.
- Party: Democratic
- Spouse(s): Mary Jane Glasgow; Alice Wilson McCorkle

Military service
- Allegiance: Confederate States
- Branch/service: Confederate States Army
- Years of service: 1862–1865
- Unit: 7th Virginia Cavalry
- Battles/wars: American Civil War

John Thomas Dunlop (January 25, 1842 – March 25, 1907) was an American politician who served in the Virginia House of Delegates.
