= John Dunlop (minister) =

John Dunlop, CBE (born 1939) is one of the most significant figures within Irish Presbyterianism in the latter half of the 20th century.

== Early life and career ==
Born in Newry, County Down, Northern Ireland, UK, in 1939, he served with the Presbyterian Overseas Board as a minister with the United Church in Jamaica and the Cayman Islands. His first congregation was at Mount Hermon in the west of Jamaica and then in 1971 he succeeded Rev David Lapsley, another Irish Presbyterian minister, as minister of Webster Memorial United Church in Kingston.

From 1978 to 2005, Dunlop was minister of Rosemary Presbyterian Church but with the support and encouragement of the congregational leadership he has exercised a wider ministry in efforts to further better relations between Protestant and Roman Catholics encouraging each community to better understand the other's culture and history.

He was Moderator of the General Assembly of the Presbyterian Church in Ireland in 1992–93.

== Public appointments ==
From 1987 to 1999, Dunlop was Senator of Queen’s University Belfast. From 1996 to 1997, along with Peter North, Vice-chancellor of Oxford University, and Fr Oliver Crilly from Strabane, Dunlop was a member of the Independent Review of Parades and Marches which laid the foundations of the Parades Commission in Northern Ireland.

== Academic degrees ==
- Bachelor of Arts in Philosophy (1962), Queen's University of Belfast
- Honorary Doctor of Divinity (DD), Presbyterian Theological Faculty, Ireland
- Honorary Doctor of Divinity(DD), Trinity College, Dublin
- Honorary Doctor of Laws (LLD), University of Ulster
- Honorary Doctor of Laws (LLD), Queen's University, Belfast

== Awards ==
1989: Eisenhower Fellow from Eisenhower Fellowships in Philadelphia representing Northern Ireland.

1993: The "Cultural Traditions Award", in recognition of his "established and continuing contribution to debate on cultural diversity within Northern Ireland".

2004: CBE for services to the community.

== Lectures ==
1985/86: The Warrack Lectures on "Preaching in the Midst of Conflict" in the Theological Faculties of the Universities of Edinburgh, Aberdeen, Glasgow and St Andrews.

== Publications ==
- Book: "A Precarious Belonging: Presbyterians and the Conflict in Ireland" (1995), a description of Presbyterians in Ireland and how their values and attitudes have underpinned political life in Northern Ireland since its beginning.

Presbyterian Church titles
Preceded by Rodney Sterritt (1991)	Moderator of the Presbyterian Church in Ireland; 1992	Succeeded by Andrew Rutherford Rodgers (1993)
