= Thomas Dunlop & Sons =

Scottish shipping firm founded in 1851

- Company type: Private
- Industry: Shipping
- Founded: 1851
- Founder: Thomas Dunlop (1831–1893)
- Headquarters: Glasgow, Scotland
- Divisions: Clan Line, Queen Line

Thomas Dunlop & Sons is a shipping firm founded in 1851, in Glasgow, Scotland. The firm had business ties with foreign grain and flour merchants, as well as shipowners and brokers.

== About ==
The company was most famous for the Clan Line of sailing ships (resulting from its 1881 merger with Cayzer, Irvine & Company) and the Queen Line (1878) of steamers. The original location of the headquarters was Madeira Court on Argyle Street, moving later to the Corn Exchange Buildings at 5 Waterloo Street, both in Glasgow. After the merger in 1881, the Clan Line headquarters was relocated to 109 Hope Street, Glasgow.

The founder of the company was Thomas Dunlop (born 15 March 1831, died 30 January 1893). His son was Sir Thomas Dunlop, 1st Baronet (born 2 August 1855, died 29 January 1938), who became a senior partner in the company.
