= Sir Thomas Dunlop, 1st Baronet =

Scottish businessman (1855–1938)

Sir Thomas Dunlop Bt GBE JP DL

Lord Provost of Glasgow
- In office 1914–1917

Personal details
- Born: 2 August 1855
- Died: 29 January 1938 (aged 82)

Sir Thomas Dunlop, 1st Baronet (2 August 1855 – 29 January 1938) was a Scottish businessman.

== Life ==
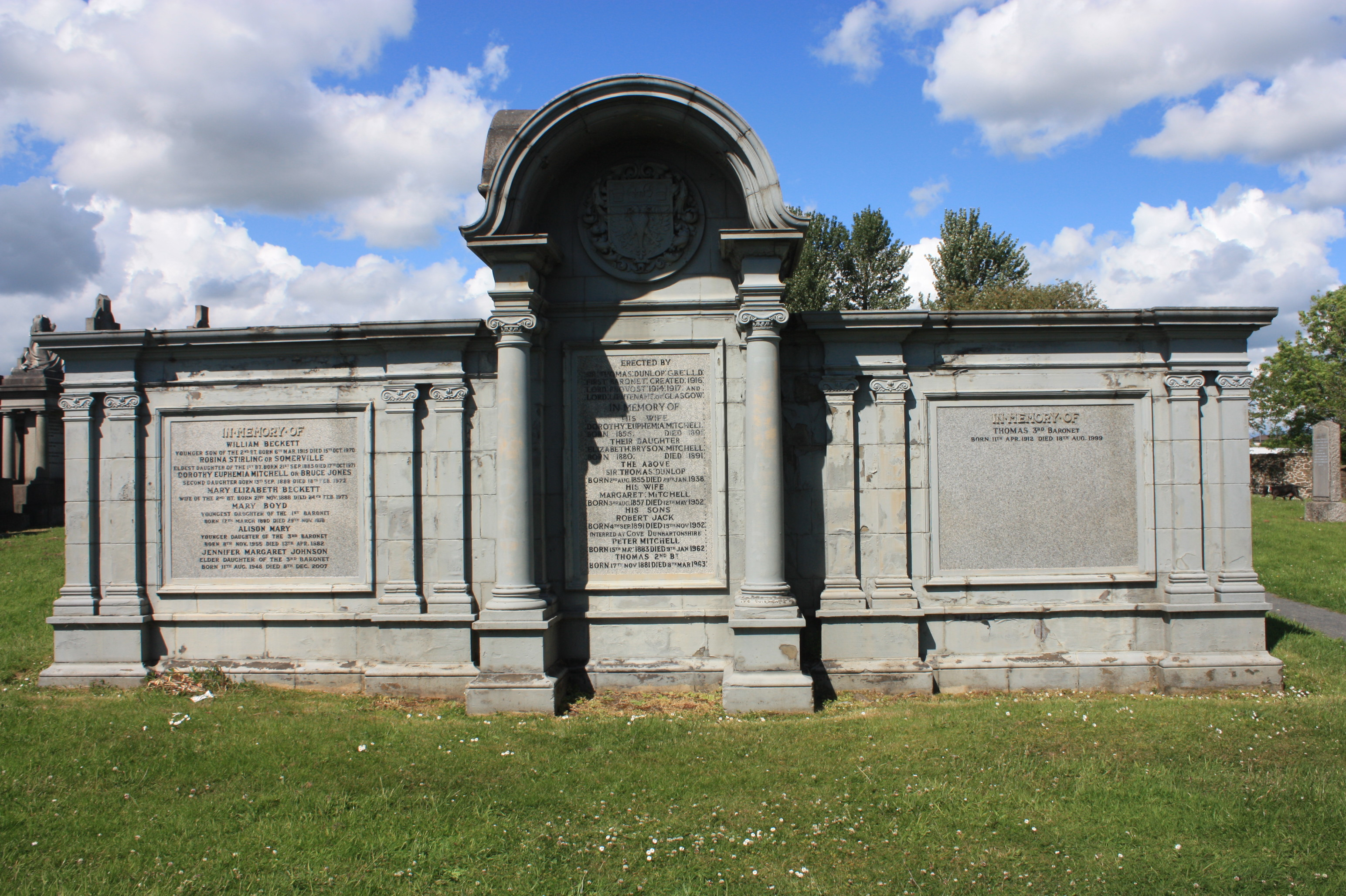
The grave of Sir Thomas Dunlop and family, Glasgow Necropolis

Dunlop was the eldest son of Thomas Dunlop (1831–1893), a grain merchant and founder of the shipping company, Thomas Dunlop & Sons, and his wife, Robina Jack. He became a senior partner in his father's company and later a director of the Royal Bank of Scotland, Bruce Peebles Ltd and the Scottish Union and National Insurance Company.

In 1914, he became Lord Provost of Glasgow and was created a baronet in 1916 due to this position and appointed a Knight Grand Cross of the Order of the British Empire (GBE) in 1918.

Dunlop is buried with his family in the Glasgow Necropolis. The grave lies on the southern path of the main upper section.

== Family ==
In 1879 Dunlop was married to Dorothy Euphemia Mitchell (1855–1892), daughter of Peter Mitchell of Longniddry. When she died he married her younger sister, Margaret Mitchell (1857–1952).

When he died the baronetcy fell to his eldest son, Thomas Dunlop (1881–1963).

Honorary titles
Preceded by Sir Daniel Stevenson	Lord Provost of Glasgow; 1914–1917	Succeeded by Sir James Stewart
Baronetage of the United Kingdom
New creation	Baronet (of Woodbourne); 1916–1938	Succeeded by Thomas Dunlop
