= Dunlop baronets =

Set index for Shelley baronets

There have been two baronetcies created for persons with the surname Dunlop, with both in the Baronetage of the United Kingdom. One creation is extant as of 2026.

- Dunlop baronets of Dunlop (1838)
- Dunlop baronets of Woodbourne (1916)
