= Gould =

Gould may refer to:

== People ==
- Gould (name), a surname

== Places ==
=== United States ===
- Gould, Arkansas, a city
- Gould, Colorado, an unincorporated community
- Gould, Ohio, an unincorporated community
- Gould, Oklahoma, a town
- Gould, West Virginia, an unincorporated community
- Gould City, Michigan
- Gould City, Washington
- Gould Township, Minnesota

=== Multiple countries ===
- Gould Lake (disambiguation)
- Mount Gould (disambiguation)

=== Elsewhere ===
- Gould (crater), a lunar crater formation
- Gould Coast, Antarctica
- Gould Dome, Alberta, Canada

== Other uses ==
- Gould baronets, two titles, one in the Baronetage of England and one in the Baronetage of Great Britain
- Gould Belt, a partial ring of stars in the Milky Way
- Gould designation, a type of star identifier
- Gould League, an independent Australian organisation promoting environmental education
- Gould Electronics, a company involved in the electronics and semiconductor industries
- Gould Racing, a British motorsport company
- USC Gould School of Law, a law school within the University of Southern California
- Gould Academy, Bethel, Maine, United States, a private college preparatory boarding and day school
- HMS Gould, a British Second World War frigate
- Gould Stradivarius, a violin made by Antonio Stradivari

== See also ==
- Gould City, Michigan, United States, an unincorporated community
- Gould City, Washington, United States, an unincorporated community
- Goulds (disambiguation)
- Goa'uld, a fictional race in the Stargate franchise
- Gold (disambiguation)
