= Gould Lake Conservation Area =

Conservation area in Ontario, Canada

- IUCN category V (protected landscape/seascape)
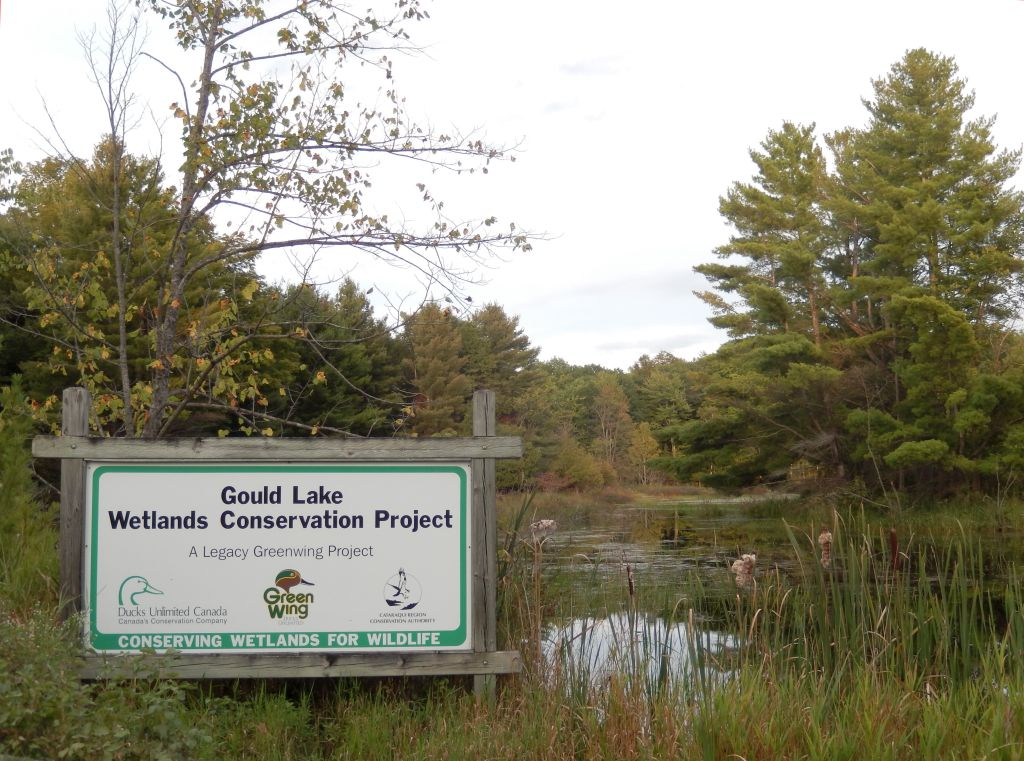
- Gould Lake Wetlands Conservation Project

- Location within Southern Ontario
- Location: South Frontenac, Frontenac County, Ontario, Canada
- Nearest city: Kingston, Ontario
- Coordinates: 44°28′12″N 76°34′48″W
- Area: 589 ha (1,455 acres)
- Governing body: Cataraqui Region Conservation Authority
- Website: crca.ca/conservation-lands/conservation-areas/gould-lake-conservation-area/

Gould Lake Conservation Area is a rural conservation area located in the Canadian Shield northwest of the community of Sydenham in the Township of South Frontenac, Frontenac County, in eastern Ontario, Canada. The area was created to manage water resources, preserve wildlife habitat, and provide recreational and educational opportunities, and is managed by the Cataraqui Region Conservation Authority. The conservation area contains much of Gould Lake.

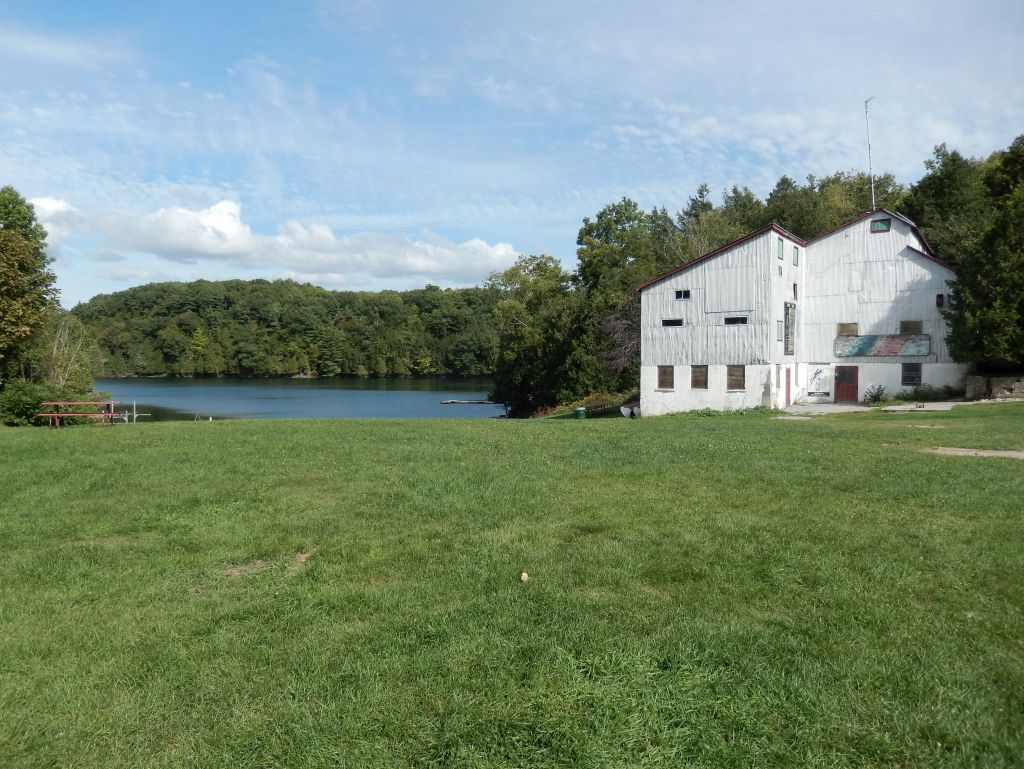
Picnic area and barn. The barn is the focus for outdoor education programming.

== Geology and geography ==
The conservation area lies just north of the bedrock scarp that denotes the boundary between the Canadian Shield of the Frontenac Axis with its Precambrian bedrock and the Paleozoic Ordovician formations to the south. The bedrock was significantly eroded by the glaciers of the Late Wisconsinan age.

The headwaters of the Millhaven Creek system lies within the area. Gould Lake drains south through Silvers Lake and Little Long Lake and then into Eel Bay, an extension of Sydenham Lake. Sydenham Lake in turn drains into Millhaven Creek, which flows to Lake Ontario. The park's watershed is thus in the Great Lakes Basin.

== Nature and ecology ==
Lying within the Great Lakes-St. Lawrence forest region, tree species that grow in the conservation area include eastern hemlock, white cedar, yellow birch, white birch, eastern white pine, red maple, sugar maple, and black spruce. Wildlife include white-tailed deer, beaver, black bear, and muskrat. Species of fish within Gould Lake include smallmouth and largemouth bass, pumpkinseed, and yellow perch.

== History ==
Industrial expansion in the 19th century led to the opening of several mica mines in the Gould Lake area. A number of old mine pits and other mining relics can be seen. The McClatchy Mine, which operated until 1912, originally mined phosphate until it was sold and then mined for mica.

The Cataraqui Region Conservation Authority bought land that would become the conservation area between 1967 and 1973.

== Facilities and activities ==
Gould Lake Conservation Area is a day-use area; no camping is permitted. Picnicking, fishing, canoeing, wildlife viewing, cross country skiing, hiking, and swimming are the main activities visitors participate in. The Rideau Trail Association maintains about 20 kilometres (12 mi) of trails, including a portion of the main trail of the Rideau Trail and many side trails. The Limestone District School Board uses the original barn located near the beach as the focus of its outdoor education programs at the property.
