= Kingston Collegiate and Vocational Institute =

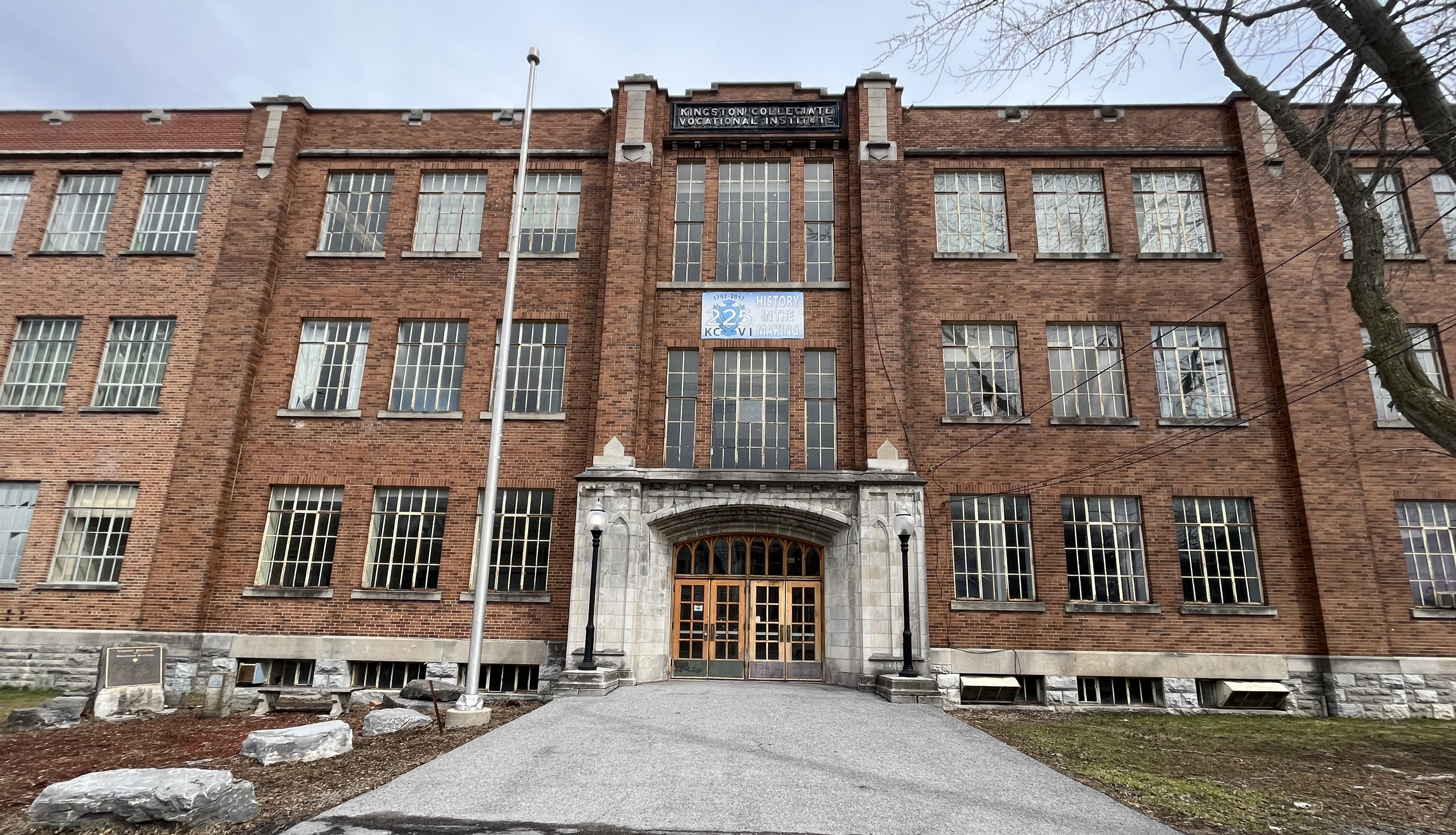
- Main Entrance to the KCVI Building (2023)

Location
- 235 Frontenac Street; Kingston, Ontario, K7L 3S7; Canada

Information
- School type: Secondary
- Motto: Maxima Debetur Pueris Reverentia ("Youth are entitled to the greatest respect")
- Founded: 1792
- Closed: December 11, 2020
- School board: Limestone District School Board
- Area trustee: Paula Murray
- Principal: Talya McKenna
- Grades: 9–12
- Language: English, French, Spanish, and Latin
- Colours: Blue and white
- Mascot: Blue bear
- Team name: Blues
- Yearbook: The Times

Kingston Collegiate and Vocational Institute (KCVI) was a secondary school in Kingston, Ontario, Canada. Founded in 1792 by Reverend John Stuart based upon a grant for secondary education in the colony of Upper Canada, it moved to its location at 235 Frontenac Street in 1892. It is considered the oldest public secondary school in Ontario and the second oldest in Canada. The site and remaining buildings were purchased by Queen's University in 2021.

KCVI was Kingston's only public secondary school until the opening of Queen Elizabeth Collegiate and Vocational Institute (QECVI) in 1955 and Loyalist Collegiate and Vocational Institute (LCVI) in 1963.

In 2012, KCVI was ranked by the Fraser Institute as the top performing school in the Limestone Board and in the top 10 per cent of public schools in Ontario.

When KCVI closed in December 2020, its student population moved to Kingston Secondary School, a new school constructed on the former QECVI site that was created to replace both KCVI and QECVI as the result of a Program and Accommodation Review Committee decision reached in 2014.

== History ==
KCVI's history starts with the Kingston Grammar school in 1792. In 1807, the school was renamed Midland District Grammar School. From c. 1825–1830, the future first prime minister of Canada, John A. Macdonald, attended the school. In 1853 the school moved to a new location (now Sydenham Public School) and was renamed Kingston County Grammar School. It was renamed Kingston High School in 1871, becoming Kingston Collegiate Institute (KCI) in 1872.

Girls were first admitted as students in January 1877, and the school remained co-educational until its closure in 2020. Fifteen years later, at the institution's centenary in 1892, the school moved to its site on Frontenac Street. Finally, with the addition of a technical and commercial teaching wing in 1931, the school was renamed Kingston Collegiate and Vocational Institute (KCVI), the name it retained until its closure.

The oldest remaining wing of the school is the 1915 wing, which housed science laboratories. The original wing was destroyed by fire but was replaced. The school celebrated its bicentenary in 1992 and celebrated its 225th anniversary in 2017. The school is commonly recognized as the oldest public high school in Ontario and the second oldest in the country.

The school closure and move to former QECVI site was planned to happen at the end of the 2018–19 school year, but was then moved to happen in the middle of the 2019–20 school year. The school closure was delayed again another until the end of the 2019–20 school year in September 2019. The school finally had its last day of in-person classes on December 11, 2020.

In 2021, Queen's University was approached by the Limestone District School Board and was offered to buy or lease the property and Queen's decided to pursue the offer.

== Athletics ==
The team colours were blue and white. The team name for all sports was "Blues" and the mascot was a blue bear. The school competed in various sports including, but not limited to: rowing, cross-country, track and field, football, chess club, rugby, hockey, basketball, volleyball, soccer, mountain biking, curling, Ping-Pong, tennis, badminton, baseball, golf, swimming, and skiing, along with various other sports.

== Coat of arms ==
A new coat of arms was formally conferred on KCVI by Ray Hnatyshyn, then Governor General of Canada, in 1992. It celebrated KCVI's 200th anniversary.

The Latin motto, maxima debetur pueris reverentia, can be roughly translated to "Youth are entitled to the greatest respect". Another more literal translation would be "The greatest respect is owed to boys". The differences in translation are not an attempt to make the motto more politically correct. The Latin word "puer", refers to a boy (or child) under the age of 17 (juvenis would refer to older youth) and in the plural is used to refer to groups of children of both genders.

== IB Diploma program ==
KCVI was one of 84 schools in Canada that ran the International Baccalaureate program. The IB diploma program was offered at KCVI during the last two years of secondary school. However, there is also the Pre-IB program to prepare the Grade 9 and 10 students for the rigorous pace of the IB curriculum. Also, if students did not want to enroll in the complete IB diploma program, they could apply for IB certificates in the course of their choosing. Students who applied for the IB certificate but were ultimately rejected could still take an IB course, however it would count as a normal credit and not an IB credit.

== SHSM (Specialist High Skills Major) ==
KCVI offered a SHSM in Arts in Culture and Communication Technologies.

== KCVI clubs ==
KCVI had many different activities going on throughout the school year, such as: the Students' Association – student government, DECA – Student Marketing Club, the student-run Leadership Conference, the improv teams, Mathletes, Model UN, Respect Committee, Outdoors Club, Environment Club, South African Partnership and Youth in Action, Drama Club, Robotics Club and the Debating Club. There was also an Athletics Association in charge of many sport-related school events. The Arts Council was formed in the 2006–07 year as a complement to the Athletic Association. The KCVI Yearbook Committee created a pictorial account of each year in a yearbook called "The Times". As well, KCVI hosted CKVI (The Cave), a radio broadcasting focus program, which broadcast at 91.9 FM in downtown Kingston.

=== KCVI DECA ===
KCVI's DECA chapter was the largest and most successful in eastern Ontario, with members competing and winning medals at regional, provincial and international competitions, winning over 100 medals, 20 plaques, and 5 ICDC trophies over the past 9 years. Since its establishment in 2005 until the school's closure in 2020, KCVI's DECA chapter saw significant growth, and registered over 60 members for its 2013–2014 season, making it one of the largest clubs at KCVI at that time. The KCVI DECA chapter also saw active participation within the community of Kingston, having active partnerships with influential businesses and organizations such as VisitKingston.ca, Kingston Community Credit Union, Kingston Economic Development Corporation, and the Queen's University School of Business, raising over $4000 in generous sponsorships and grants.

The KCVI DECA chapter's performance at the 2014 International Career Development Conference in Atlanta, Georgia was its best to that point, taking home over 20 medals and 3 trophies.

=== KCVI Improv Team ===
KCVI has a long and decorated history of competing in the Canadian Improv Games. Since the Kingston Regional Tournament was re-established in the 1996–97 school year, until school's closure in 2020, KCVI won 10 regional gold medals (including 7 back-to-back regional titles from 1997 to 2003), three regional silver medals and one regional bronze medal. The team won national bronze in 1998.

=== Kingston Model United Nations ===
KCVI hosted a Model United Nations for several years, held every spring. Recently the Model UN has started to expand outside the school.

=== K-Botics ===
K-Botics was an extracurricular program at the school where students design and build a robot from scratch to participate in a game created by FIRST. The group received support from local companies and community volunteers. K-Botics merged to become Lake Effect Robotics after the 2016 season.

=== Lake Effect Robotics ===
Lake Effect Robotics, otherwise known as FRC team 2708 that was formed as a merger of K-Botics, FRC team 2809, and the CyberFalcons, FRC team 3710. Lake Effect Robotics was on the winning alliance at the Detroit FIRST World Championship in 2018.

=== Student government ===
Many school events and spirit days at KCVI ware organized and implemented by the SA (Students' Association), the KCVI student government.

== Street Smart ==
Street Smart is a Community Education Centre of the Limestone District School Board where students can earn their high school diploma in a more relaxed environment. They provide on-site secondary education for students aged primarily 16–20 who require an alternative setting for earning high school credits. They are staffed with certified secondary school teachers.

== Focus Programs ==
The Limestone District School Board offered a number of courses that concentrated on a particular field of interest to give students training, academic experience, and work experience that will give them a foundation in that area of study. There were a variety of programs that prepared students for different destinations post-graduation: university, college, apprenticeships, and direct entry into the workplace. The programs offered at KCVI specifically included guitar building and radio broadcast journalism.

== Notable students ==
- J. Adam Brown, actor
- Don Cherry, hockey commentator
- Helen Cooper, federal and municipal politician, Mayor of Kingston 1988–1993
- Robertson Davies, author
- Hugh Dillon, musician and actor
- Gord Downie, musician and actor, lead singer with The Tragically Hip
- Paul D. N. Hebert, biologist, developed the DNA barcoding method of taxonomy
- Rob Gibson, Olympic medalist
- Rick Howland, actor and musician
- John A. Macdonald, first prime minister of Canada (attended Midland Grammar School, later KCVI, c. 1825–1830)
- Emily Julian McManus, poet, author, and educator
- Peter Milliken, former Speaker of the House of Commons of Canada
- Robert Mundell, Nobel laureate and "father of the Euro"
- David Usher, musician
- Jeremy Wang, better known by the alias Disguised Toast, is a Taiwanese-Canadian streamer, YouTuber, and Internet personality
- Henry Westman Richardson, Canadian Senator
- Simon Whitfield, Olympic triathlete (Gold Medalist)

=== Other ===
- Members of The Tragically Hip including Downie (see above)

== Grade Points competition ==
Students of KCVI participated in a Grade Points competition, in which different themes days (called "Spirit Days") were decided by the Students' Association and the grade with the most students participating in that theme were awarded grade points. The grade with the most grade points at the end of the year was awarded a prize. Prizes in the past include various pieces of KCVI memorabilia.

== Closure ==
In 2011, The Limestone District School Board Program and Accommodation Review Committee (PARC) began investigating strategies for managing the board's annual budget. The committee focused on investigating the advantages and disadvantages of closing select Kingston high schools that were under-enrolled or over-budget. KCVI was reviewed as a problematic institution by the committee due to the school's crumbling infrastructure and high annual overhead.

The discussion of closing KCVI caused a large disruption among its students, alumni and parents, and opposition to the closure gained support from the community, resulting in the formation of the group "Save Kingston City Schools". Many Kingston residents supported the group and its cause by posting promotional signs on their lawns and partaking in social media campaigns using Facebook. However, in December 2014, a court ruling dismissed an appeal against the closure. On March 24, 2014, 35 million dollars were allocated to the building of a new school, which began construction in November 2017. The new school, known as Kingston Secondary School (KSS), will consolidate the student populations of KCVI and QECVI, as well as relocating the Grade 7/8 French immersion Module Vanier in a 171,000-square foot building on the site of the old QECVI building.

In late September 2017, KCVI marked its 225th anniversary with a large-scale reunion event before the final closure of the school, which was planned at that time for 2019. The school remained open for the 2019–2020 school year, due to a delay in the construction of KSS due to bad weather and province-wide strike action by plumbing unions and sheet metal workers.

By April 2020, it had become clear that KSS would not be ready to open by September of that year, due in part to the provincially-mandated halt on construction imposed in response to the COVID-19 pandemic.

KCVI and Module Vanier's final day of in-person classes took place on December 11, 2020.

== Arms ==
Coat of arms of Kingston Collegiate and Vocational Institute

Notes
Granted 4 December 1989
Crest
A demi griffin Argent grasping with its dexter talon a book proper bound Azure clasped Gules and grasping with its sinister talon a representation of a Martello tower of Kingston Harbour Argent masoned roof and ports Azure.
Escutcheon
Argent two torches in saltire Azure enflamed Gules in chief a loyalist civil coronet Azure all within a bordure also Azure.
Motto
Maxima Debetur Pueris Reverentia (The Greatest Respect Is Owed To The Boys)

== See also ==
- List of high schools in Ontario
