= Gould Lake =

Gould Lake may refer to:

== Canada ==
- Gould Lake, Bruce County, Ontario
- Gould Lake (Frontenac County), Ontario
  - Gould Lake Conservation Area, encompassing much of the lake
- Gould Lake (Lee Township, Ontario), in Timiskaming District, Ontario
- Gould Lake (Van Hise Township), in Timiskaming District, Ontario

== United States ==
- Gould Lake, a waypoint on the River to River Trail in Illinois
- Gould Lake, mostly in Shingobee Township, Cass County, Minnesota
- Jay Gould Lake, a reservoir behind Pokegama Dam, Cohasset, Itasca County, Minnesota
