= Queen Elizabeth Collegiate and Vocational Institute =

Location
- 145 Kirkpatrick Street; Kingston, Ontario, K7K 2P4; Canada; 44°15′13″N 76°30′07″W

Information
- School type: Secondary
- Motto: Veritas Liberat (The Truth Frees)
- Founded: 1955
- Closed: 2016
- School board: Limestone District School Board
- Principal: Ann Marie McDonald
- Grades: 9-12
- Colours: Red and Black
- Team name: Raiders
- Yearbook: Chieftain

Queen Elizabeth Collegiate and Vocational Institute (QECVI), or "QE", was a high school in Kingston, Ontario, Canada, from 1955 to 2016. It was located at 145 Kirkpatrick Street, Kingston, Ontario, K7K 2P4.

== History ==
QECVI opened in 1955 and instituted a number of programs focusing on specific career paths. Thriving on the enrichment of the Focus Programs due in part to former principal, J.R. Mulville, the school remained opened after a long debate in 1989 that almost left the school merging with Regiopolis-Notre Dame Catholic Secondary School. J.R. Mulville referred to the focus programs as "a prime example of new ways of delivering curricula in schools, as well as a better way of teaching math and English for kids that need a different approach to things."

QECVI closed at the end of the academic year in June 2016. After closing ceremonies and a reunion, demolition began to clear the site for the construction of a new high school (Kingston Secondary School) to replace both QECVI and Kingston Collegiate and Vocational Institute. As a temporary measure, while Kingston Secondary School was still being built, students already attending QECVI were transferred to Loyalist Collegiate and Vocational Institute, while those who would have begun Grade 9 in fall 2016 attended KCVI.

== Athletics ==
QECVI's sports teams were known as the "Raiders" and participated in a wide variety of sports. Its teams had recent success in Basketball, Rugby, Girls Hockey and Baseball. QECVI, in recent years has seen success in the sport of Rugby having won three KASSAA rugby championships since 2004 and most recently being ranked #5 in OFSAA A/AA Rugby after winning their third EOSSAA championships. In 2009, Queen Elizabeth Collegiate did not field a football team and the first time in history that the high school did not have fall sports for boys. In the 2009–2010 rugby season, QECVI's senior boy's rugby team finished 3rd in KASSAA standings with a 4–2 record, with a 17–3 defeat over Holy Cross Crusaders in the quarterfinals and 14–7 win over 2nd placed Bayridge, the Raiders looked poised to win a second consecutive KASSAA Rugby Championship, but fell short 17–13 to the rival Napanee Golden Hawks, but went on to defeat South Grenville to win the EOSSAA A/AA Rugby Championship, they failed to win at OFSAA. QECVI's junior boys rugby won only one game failing to make the playoffs with a record of 1–5. Girls' Rugby was introduced to the school after a failure to form a team after trying for the previous two years, although only in exhibition play.

=== Red Raiders ===
For many years, teams were known as the "Red Raiders" until the name was changed because of perceived racial overtones.

=== Uniform Colours ===
The original school colours were also changed from red, gold and white to red and black, due to confusion created when QECVI played Sydenham High School in high school sports.

== Notable staff ==
- Mike Zannabi – recipient of Prime Minister's Awards for Teaching Excellence; Roy C. Hill Teaching Excellence Award
- Donna Stoness – J.C. McLeod Award for teaching excellence;
- Don Voteary – Queen's Associate Teacher of the Year Award;
- Lee McNaughton – Outstanding Service Awards, LDSB
- Jack Aldridge – Outstanding Service Awards, LDSB, Rotary Canada Award
- Alec Murphy – Outstanding Service Awards, LDSB
- Pamela Simon – Queen's Associate Teacher of the Year Award

== Notable alumni ==
- Ari Millen, actor
- Kirk Muller, NHL hockey player

== See also ==
- List of high schools in Ontario
- Royal eponyms in Canada
