= Cataraqui, Ontario =

Cataraqui may refer to:

- The original townsite of what is now downtown Kingston, Ontario, as founded 1673 to house a French colonial military outpost.
- A rural village west of Cataraqui Cemetery, part of the former Kingston Township.

Both points are within the current Kingston city limits.

== See also ==
- Cataraqui (disambiguation)
