= Gould Lake (Frontenac County) =

Lake in Frontenac County, Ontario, Canada

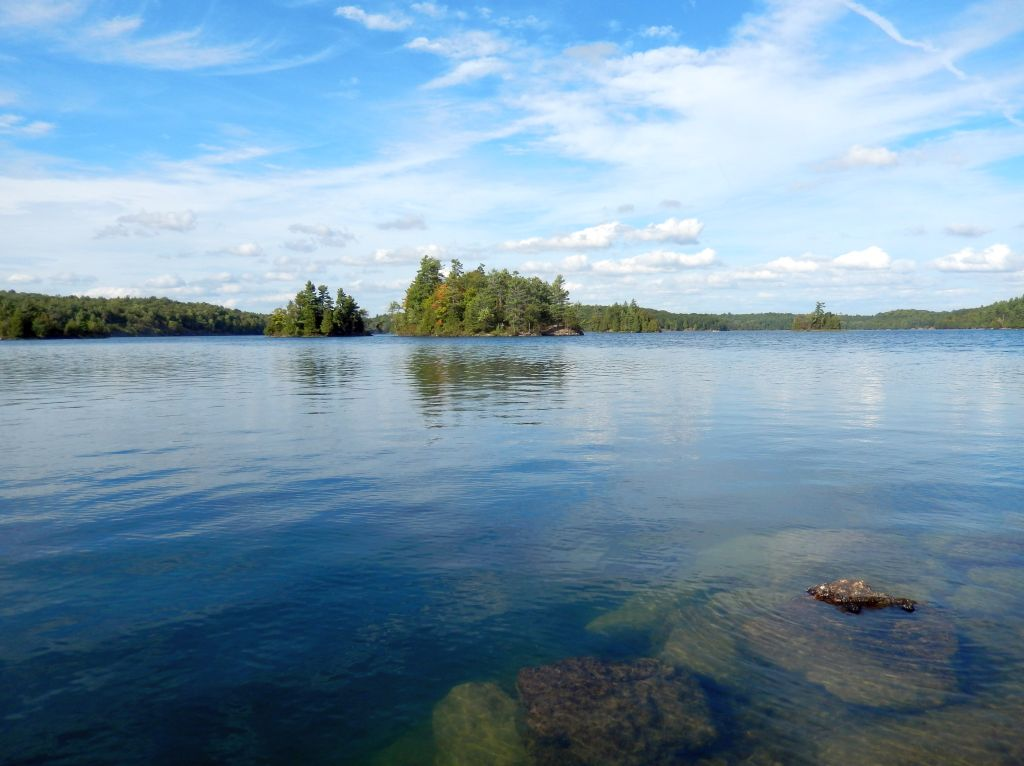
- Gould Lake seen from Point Spur

- Location in southern Ontario
- Location: South Frontenac, Frontenac County, Ontario
- Coordinates: 44°28′42″N 76°34′31″W
- Part of: Great Lakes Basin
- Basin countries: Canada
- Surface elevation: 140 metres (460 ft)

Gould Lake is a lake north of the community of Sydenham in the Township of South Frontenac, Frontenac County, in eastern Ontario, Canada. It is on the Canadian Shield, is part of the Great Lakes Basin, and is part of the headwaters of the Millhaven Creek system. In the 19th century and early-20th century, the area around Gould Lake was noted for its mica mines.

Gould Lake drains south through Silvers Lake and Little Long Lake, and then into Eel Bay, an extension of Sydenham Lake. Sydenham Lake in turn drains into Millhaven Creek, which flows to Lake Ontario.

Much of the southwest end of the lake is in the Gould Lake Conservation Area, which is under the management of the Cataraqui Region Conservation Authority.

== See also ==
- List of lakes in Ontario
