= SpaceX Mars colonization program =

Proposed human Mars program by SpaceX

SpaceX Mars colonization program (also referred to as Occupy Mars as a joking reference to the Occupy movement) is the stated long-term objective of the company SpaceX, and particularly of its founder Elon Musk, to send humans to live on Mars. The plan is to establish a self-sustaining, large scale settlement and directly democratic, self-governing colony. The motivation behind this is the belief that colonizing Mars will allow humanity to become multiplanetary, thereby ensuring the long-term survival of the human race if it becomes extinct on Earth.

Colonization is to be achieved with reusable and mass-produced, super heavy-lift launch vehicles, that is Starship. These plans for colonizing Mars have received both praise and criticism. They are supported by public interest in further human involvement beyond Earth and a desire to extend the lifetime of the human race, but skeptics question the technical feasibility, logistical execution, and biological viability of humans living on Mars. In 2026, SpaceX deprioritized its Mars ambitions in order to focus on a lunar base, often referred to as Moon Base Alpha, after Musk previously referred to this endeavour as a distraction in 2025.

== History ==
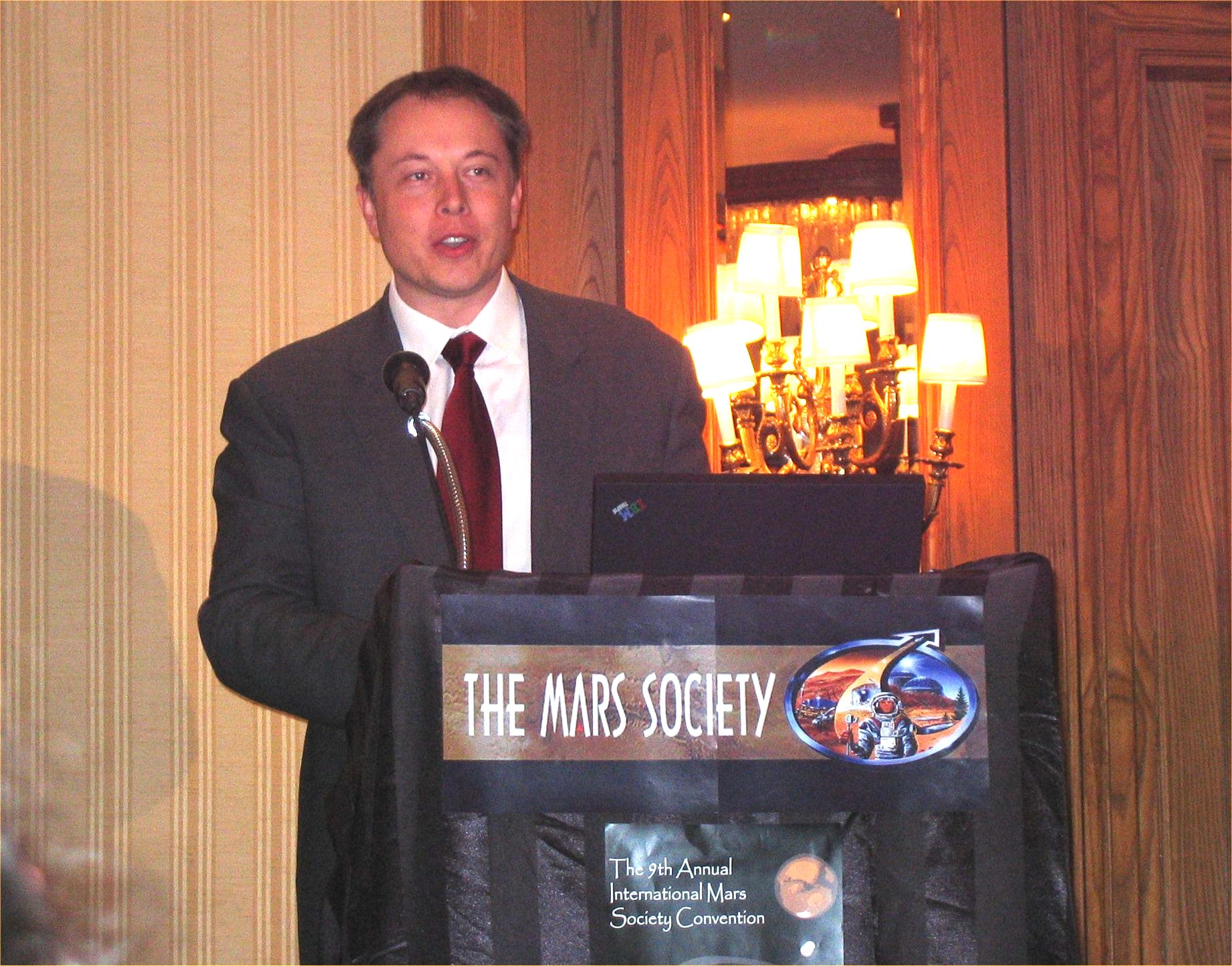
Elon Musk at the 2006 Mars Society conference

Elon Musk, founder of SpaceX, has advocated colonization of Mars at the Mars Society since at least 2001. In 2001, Musk joined the Board of Directors of the Mars Society, donating $100,000 to the organization. At the society's 2001 gathering, Musk shared a plenary stage with In-Q-Tel CIA venture capitalist Michael D. Griffin, who had previously architected the Brilliant Pebbles orbital interceptor program for the Strategic Defense Initiative (SDI). Griffin and Musk subsequently traveled to Russia together in 2002 to negotiate for refurbished intercontinental ballistic missiles (ICBMs). The failure of these negotiations was said to convince Musk to build his own rocket and establish SpaceX, which was founded in 2002. Their initial stated goal was to place an automated greenhouse on Mars, a project they called "Mars Oasis."

By 2007, Musk publicly stated a personal goal of eventually enabling humans to explore and settle on Mars. Musk eventually positioned the reusable Starship launch vehicle as the architecture to achieve this. In 2020 he said that he was "highly confident" that Starship would land humans on Mars about six years later.

However, independent aerospace researchers have questioned the technical feasibility of the Starship architecture for interplanetary missions. A 2024 feasibility study published in the journal Nature concluded that a crewed Mars mission using Starship is unworkable due to several fundamental engineering constraints. The study noted that Starship's massive dry weight results in a severe Delta-v deficit, leaving the vehicle physically unable to execute a return flight to Earth. In addition to lacking feasible closed-loop life-support, the architecture's reliance on In situ resource utilization (ISRU) to synthesize return propellant would require massive surface power generation (likely nuclear) and water-mining infrastructure that are not currently in development. Given these constraints, analysts conclude that Starship's actual capabilities, ultra-heavy but low characteristic energy launch and the Starlink mega-constellation, are optimized for Low Earth orbit rather than Mars. This architecture closely mirrors the unfulfilled heavy-lift requirements of 1980s and 1990s military space programs like Griffin's Brilliant Pebbles and the DC-X reusable rocket project.

Alignment with defense infrastructure became increasingly explicit in the late 2010s. In 2018, Griffin, acting as Under Secretary of Defense, established the Space Development Agency (SDA) to build a proliferated LEO missile-tracking constellation, awarding early contracts to SpaceX. In 2022, SpaceX introduced Starshield, a discreet military-focused division led by former U.S. General Terrence J. O'Shaughnessy. In 2024, Reuters reported that Starshield was developing a classified network of hundreds of integrated spy satellites under a $1.8 billion contract with the National Reconnaissance Office, being launched interspersed with Starlink satellites. By 2025, this LEO capability became central to the Golden Dome program, a massive space-based missile defense system intended to detect and destroy ballistic and hypersonic threats. Under the Golden Dome architecture, SpaceX is reportedly positioned to receive $2 billion to build a 600-satellite constellation for advanced missile tracking and targeting.

=== Red Dragon ===
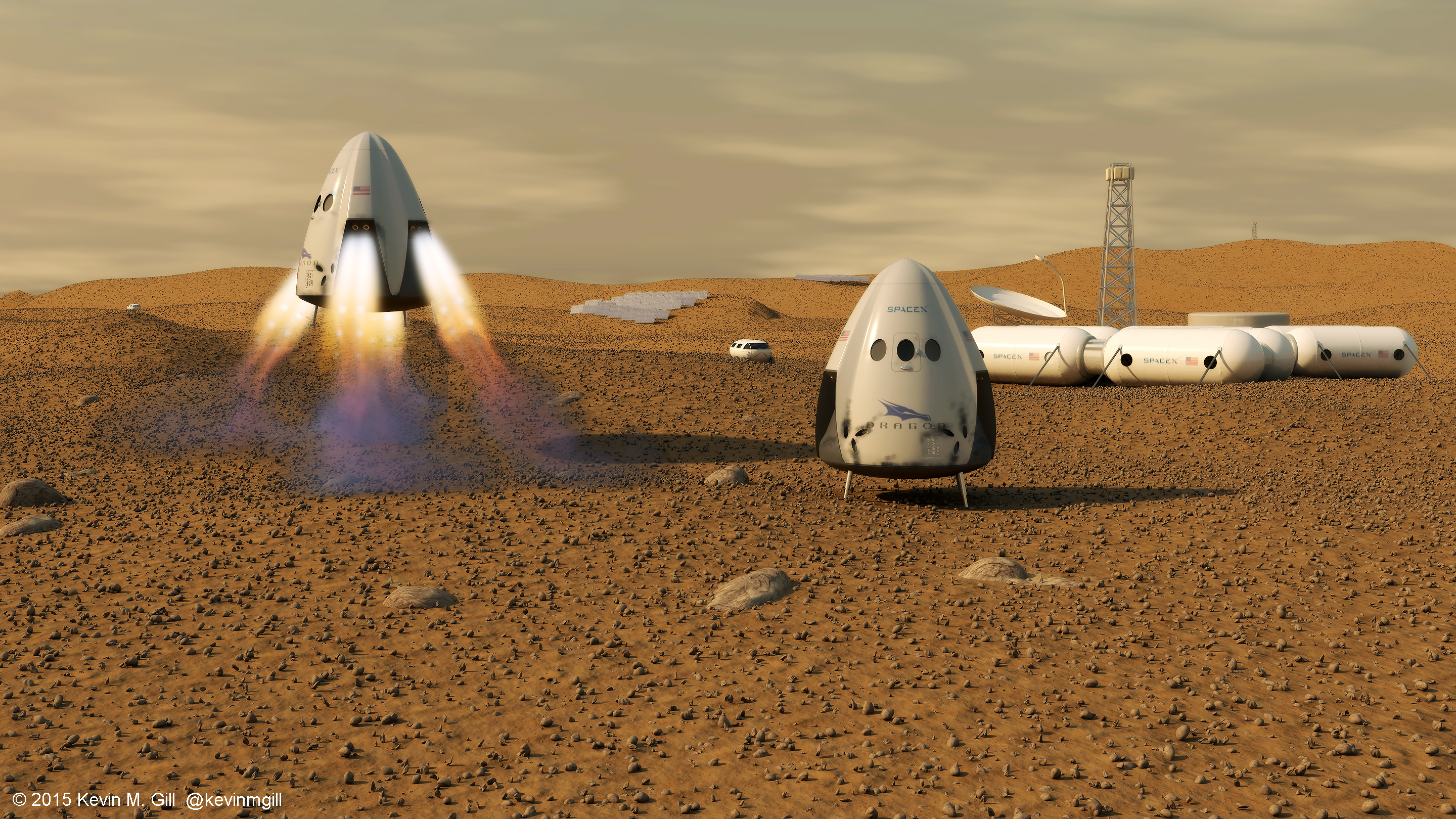
Artist's conception of two Red Dragon capsules on Mars, next to an outpost

Red Dragon was a 2011–2017 mission concept which would have used a modified Dragon 2 spacecraft as a low-cost Mars lander. The Dragon 2 would have been launched on a Falcon Heavy rocket, and would have landed by using its SuperDraco retro-propulsion thrusters. Equipping the craft with parachutes would not have been possible without significant modifications.

In 2011, SpaceX planned to use Red Dragon for Discovery Program mission #13, which would have been launched in 2022, but the plan was not submitted to NASA. Red Dragon was proposed in 2014 as a low-cost way for NASA to obtain a Mars sample return by 2021. The Red Dragon capsule would have been equipped with a system for returning samples gathered on Mars to Earth. NASA did not fund this concept. In 2016, SpaceX planned to launch two Red Dragon vehicles to Mars in 2018, with NASA providing technical support instead of funding. In 2017 Red Dragon was cancelled in favor of the much larger Starship spacecraft.

=== Starship ===
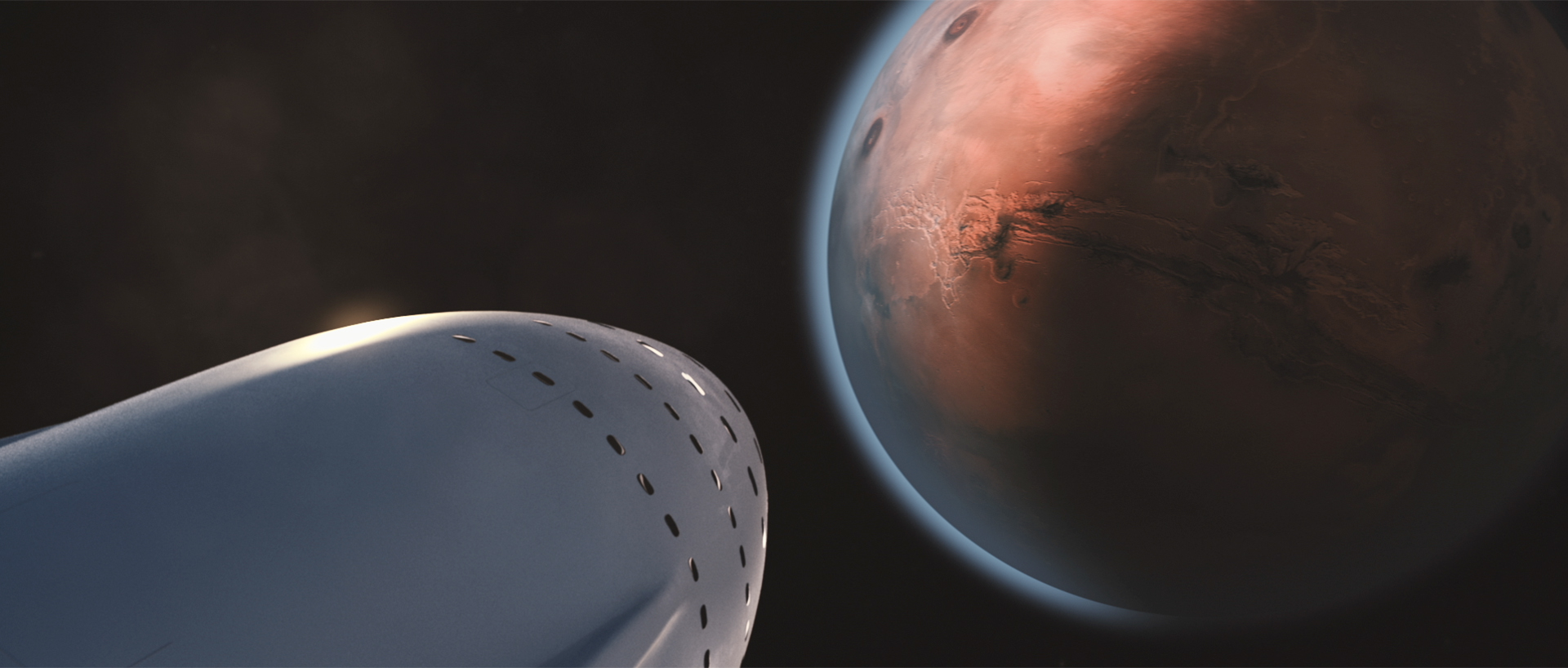
SpaceX conceptual rendering of the Interplanetary Transport System (now renamed Starship) approaching Mars

The company's current plan was first formally proposed at the 2016 International Astronautical Congress alongside a fully-reusable launch vehicle, the Interplanetary Transport System. The launch vehicle was redesigned at the end of 2018 and renamed "Starship". The new design switched from carbon fiber to stainless steel construction, which Musk claimed was far better at handling the temperature regimes the vehicle would encounter. The Starship would take off with the booster from Earth and the booster would return to the surface to be launched again. Once in orbit, the Starship would be refueled by docking with a tanker Starship variant. With fuel tanks refilled, it would travel to Mars and land on the surface. An in situ propellant production system previously positioned on Mars would produce carbon dioxide and water ice from air and soil to generate methane and oxygen by the Sabatier process. This would refuel the Starship, which could take off and return to Earth. The booster would not be needed because Mars has weaker gravity. Musk said at the time that the cost of a trip to Mars could be reduced from $10 billion to $100,000 per person and "if things go according to plan, we should be able to launch people probably in 2024 with arrival in 2025."

The development program reached several milestones in 2024. On its third test flight, Starship reached its desired trajectory for the first time and on its fourth flight test, both stages of the vehicle achieved controlled splashdown after launch for the first time.

On 7 September 2024, SpaceX announced that it would launch the first uncrewed Starship missions to Mars by 2026 to take advantage of the next Earth-Mars transfer window. It was planned to send five Starships, and Elon Musk stated that these missions would focus on testing whether Starships could reliably land intact on Mars. If the missions were a success, the company would begin crewed flights to Mars within about four years.

On 29 May 2025, Elon Musk provided an updated presentation on the SpaceX Mars program. He stated that the company aimed to target the 2026/27 Mars launch window, depending on the successful demonstration of orbital refueling capabilities. He estimated a 50% chance of being ready in time for that window. If it was missed, SpaceX planned to attempt the next launch opportunity, with the overall timeline extending by two years. Musk outlined a launch schedule in the event of a successful 2026/27 mission, including approximately 20 missions during the 2028/29 window, 100 missions during 2030/31, and up to 500 missions by the 2033 launch window.

On 9 February 2026, Elon Musk announced a delay in SpaceX's Mars ambitions for "about five to seven years" in order to focus on lunar missions.

== Composition ==
=== Goals ===
As early as 2007, Musk stated a personal goal of eventually enabling human exploration and settlement of Mars. SpaceX has stated that its goal is to colonize Mars to ensure the long-term survival of the human species by enabling humankind to become multiplanetary.

=== Launch system ===
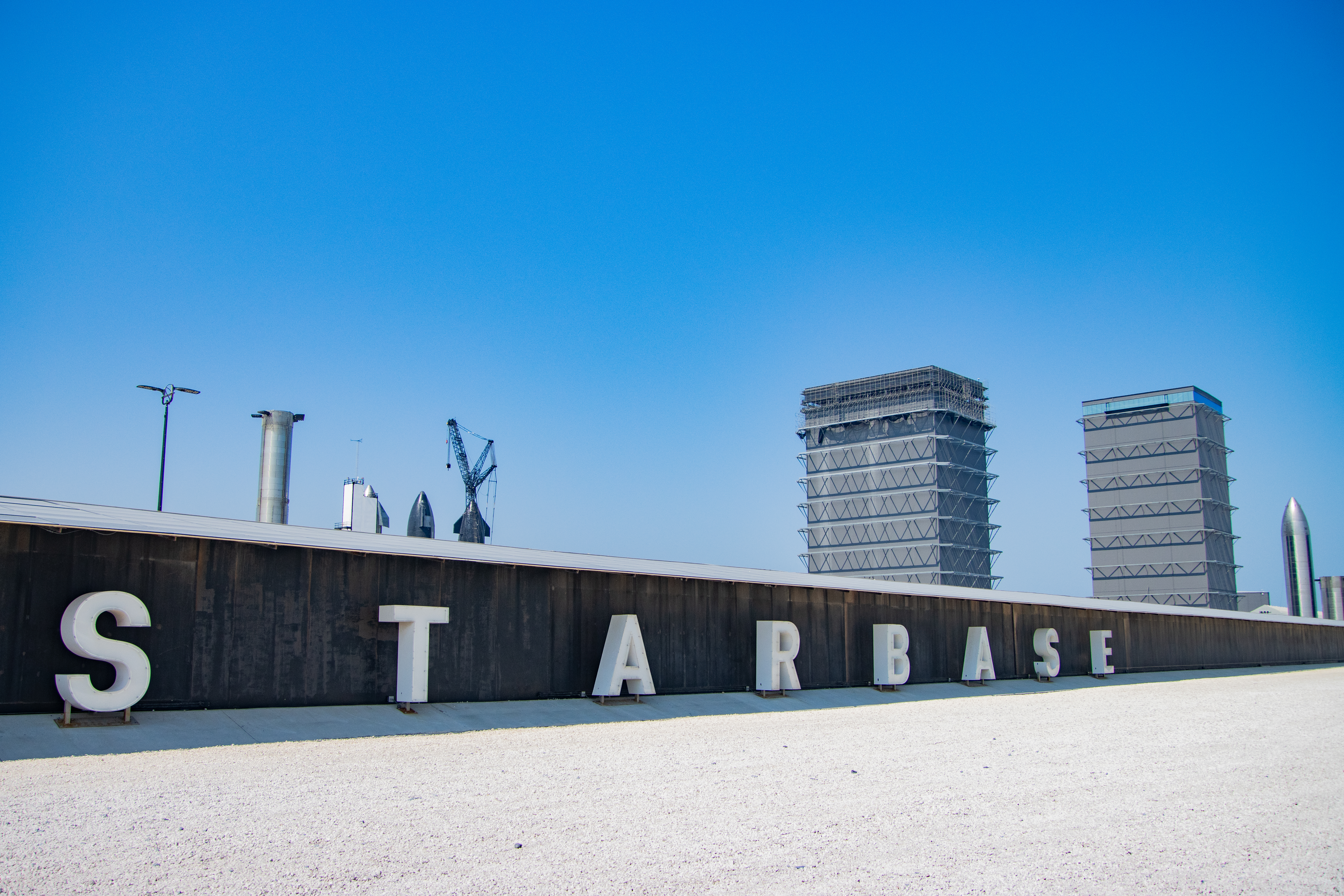
SpaceX super heavy-lift launch vehicle Starship assembly at its launch facility called Starbase on the Boca Chica (Texas) peninsula in the Rio Grande delta at the Gulf of Mexico

In 2014, SpaceX began building a facility called Starbase, and later a factory called Starfactory, on a previously populated location adjacent to the wildlife preservation area at Boca Chica (Texas) peninsula in the Rio Grande delta at the Gulf of Mexico, to build and launch a fully reusable super heavy-lift launch vehicle named Starship. The vehicle's reusability would greatly reduce launch costs and enable rapid maintenance between flights. It was intended that when Starship became operational it would travel to Mars carrying human colonists. Musk has stated that a Starship orbital launch could eventually cost $2 million, after starting at $10 million within 2–3 years and dropping with time. It was intended that Starfactory would eventually build Starships at the rate of one per day.

The rocket consists of a Super Heavy first-stage booster and a Starship second-stage spacecraft, powered by Raptor and Raptor Vacuum engines. Both stages are made from stainless steel. Methane was chosen as fuel for the Raptor engines because it was relatively inexpensive, produces low amounts of soot compared to other hydrocarbons, and could be created on Mars from carbon dioxide from the atmosphere and hydrogen using the Sabatier reaction. The engine family used a new metal alloy for the main combustion chamber, enabling it to contain 300 bar (4,400 psi) of pressure, the most of all current engines. In the future it could be mass-produced and cost about $230,000 per engine, or $100 per kilonewton of thrust.

=== First missions ===
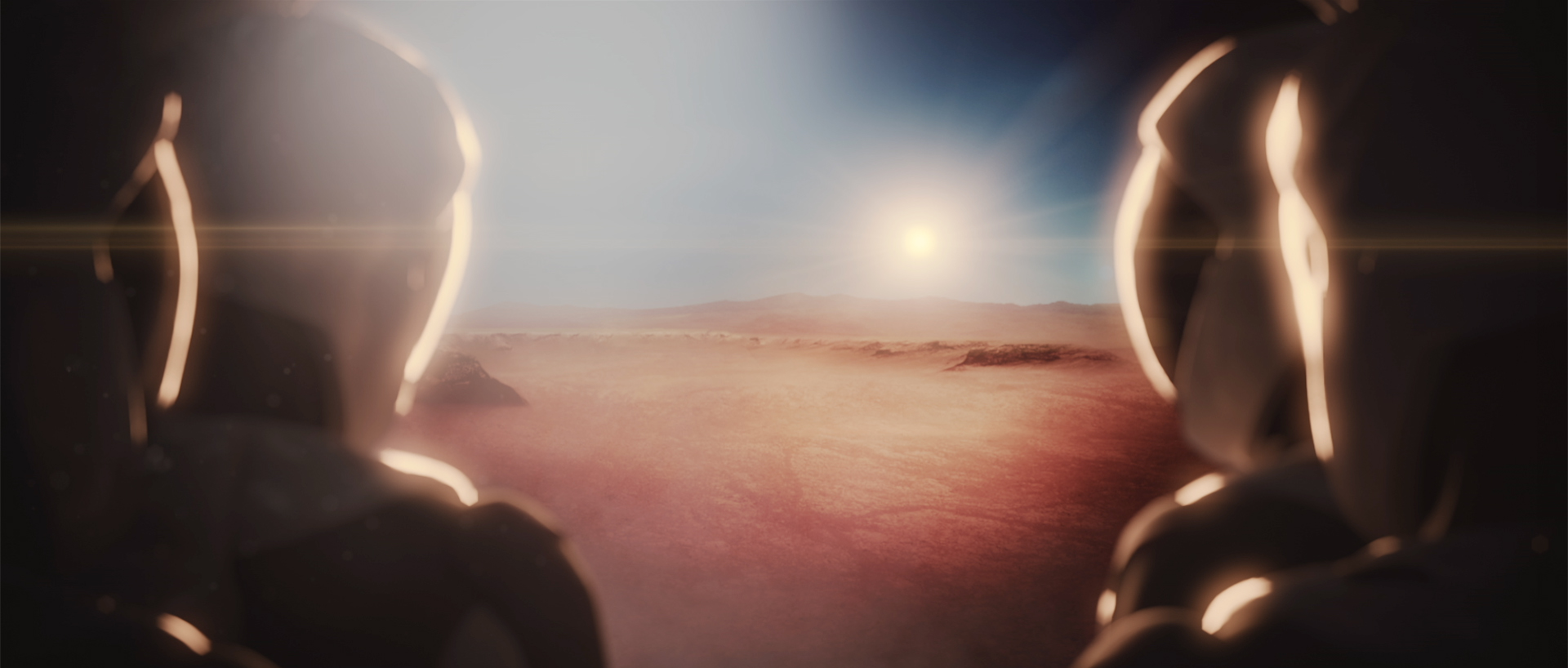
An artist's conception of astronauts on Mars in a 2016 IAC presentation

Musk has stated that Starship's earliest possible Mars landing could have been 2022, and that a crewed mission to Mars would take place no earlier than 2029. It was intended that SpaceX's early missions to Mars would involve small fleets of Starship spacecraft, funded by public–private partnerships.

SpaceX has stated that it planned to build a crewed base on Mars which it hoped would grow into a self-sufficient colony. Before any people were transported to Mars, a number of cargo missions would be undertaken in order to transport equipment, habitats and supplies. Equipment that would accompany the early groups would include "machines to produce fertilizer, methane and oxygen from Mars' atmospheric nitrogen and carbon dioxide and the planet's subsurface water ice" as well as construction materials to build transparent domes for growing crops. The company planned to synthesize methane from subsurface water and atmospheric carbon dioxide with the Sabatier reaction to produce enough fuel for return journeys, and to use similar technologies on Earth to create carbon-neutral propellant. In September 2024, SpaceX planned to launch five uncrewed Starships to Mars during the next available Earth–Mars transfer window in 2026.

In 2016, Musk's plans for the first crewed Mars mission were that it would consist of approximately 12 people, with goals to "build and troubleshoot the propellant plant and Mars Base Alpha power system" and establish a "rudimentary base". It is unclear to what extent, if any, these plans have been updated following announcements that Tesla's Optimus robot would go to Mars before humans.

=== Populating Mars ===
SpaceX hoped to begin sending colonists once infrastructure was established on Mars and launch costs from Earth were reduced. After the first few crewed Mars landings, Musk has suggested that the number of people sent to Mars could be rapidly increased. Musk's timeline for the colonization of Mars involved a first crewed mission as early as 2029 and the development of a self-sustaining colony by 2050.

A successful colonization, with a human presence established on Mars expanding over many decades, would ultimately have involved many more economic actors than SpaceX. Musk stated in 2024 that being able to make use of local resources on Mars would be essential for establishing a self-sustaining colony, and that SpaceX intended a colony to develop self-sufficiency in "seven to nine years". Proposals included harvesting CO2 from the atmosphere and splitting it into its components. This would have involved using O_{2} as well as CH_{4} for fuel production, and also using O_{2} with the addition of nitrogen (the second-most common gas in the Martian atmosphere) to provide breathable air.

The program aimed to send a million people to Mars, using 1000 Starships launched during Mars launch windows which occur approximately every 26 months. The journeys would have required 80 to 150 days of transit time, averaging approximately 115 days (for the nine synodic periods occurring between 2024 and 2041).

== Reception ==
=== Support ===
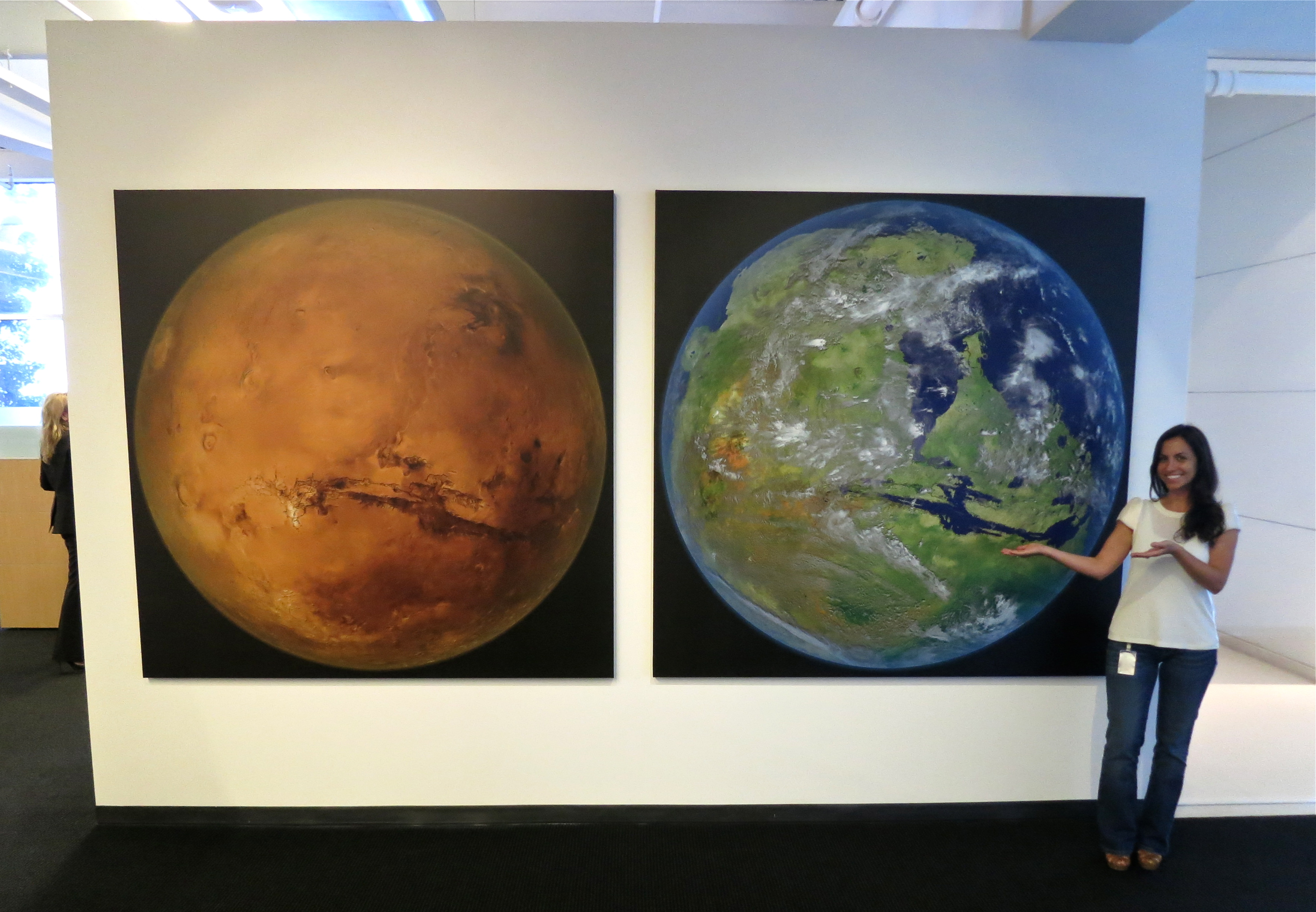
We bring you Mars, a rendering of a terraformed Mars at SpaceX Headquarters

Some experts like Robert Zubrin have supported the concept. There is water ice in the form of permafrost and glaciers on Mars, as well as other resources such as carbon dioxide and nitrogen. According to Zubrin, Starship's planned lower launch cost could make space research profitable, allowing major advancements in medicine, computers and material science, making mining profitable and space-based economy and colonization practical. Others like Saul Zimet have expressed strong support for the concept, suggesting that technological advances that could be developed on Mars would benefit the whole of Earth.

=== Criticism ===
SpaceX's plans for the colonization of Mars have been criticized on ethical and technical grounds. Zahaan Barhmal of The Guardian has argued that settling humans on Mars may divert attention from solving problems on Earth that could also become problems on Mars, on the basis that plans about Mars are always about plans we have for Earth. Jeff Bezos, founder of Blue Origin, a SpaceX competitor in commercial spaceflight, has advocated moving heavy industry from Earth to Low Earth Orbit as opposed to colonizing Mars. Jackie Watts of CNN argues that SpaceX's support for extraterrestrial settlement perpetuates colonialist mentalities.

Isabella Cisneros of The Space Review argues that the physical and social consequences of attempting long-term survival on the surface of Mars would need to be addressed. Former U.S. President Barack Obama has said that Mars could be more inhospitable than Earth would be, "even after a nuclear war", and others have pointed out that planet Earth and underground shelters could still provide better conditions and protection for more people if it were needed. The colonization of Mars has been called a 'dangerous delusion' by Lord Martin Rees, a British cosmologist/astrophysicist and the Astronomer Royal of the United Kingdom. Zahaan Bharmal in the Guardian has additionally argued that exploration of Mars is better left to the already successful robot missions, and that crewed missions would be too expensive, dangerous and boring.

Plans for SpaceX's Mars program have been criticized as far-fetched because of uncertainties about financing, and because they mostly deal with transportation to Mars and not with the business of establishing a functioning colony. As of July 2019, SpaceX had not explained its plans for the spacecraft's life-support systems and radiation protection, and for making use of resources once the colonists had landed. George Dvorsky writing for Gizmodo characterized Musk's timeline for Martian colonization as "stupendously unreasonable" and "pure delusion".

== Law ==
SpaceX intended to base the laws governing a Martian colony on self-determination and direct democracy (instead of representative democracy). Some of this policy has appeared in the terms and services agreement for individual users of SpaceX's Starlink platform, which state the following: "The parties recognize Mars as a free planet and that no Earth-based government has authority or sovereignty over Martian activities".

In contrast, internationally agreed space law proclaims space to be the "province of all mankind" and holds that Mars is not available to be claimed as property. Its legal status shares some elements of the legal status of international waters on Earth. In addition, it is thought that the business of technocratic colonizers trying to accomplish direct-democracy and the legal accommodation of a diverse population will be challenging.
