= Gulde =

Gulde may refer to:

- Gulde, Mississippi, an unincorporated community in Rankin County, Mississippi, United States

== People with the surname ==
- Manuel Gulde (born 1991), German footballer

== See also ==
- Gould (disambiguation)
