= Little Cataraqui Creek Conservation Area =

Conservation area in Kingston, Ontario, Canada

- IUCN category V (protected landscape/seascape)
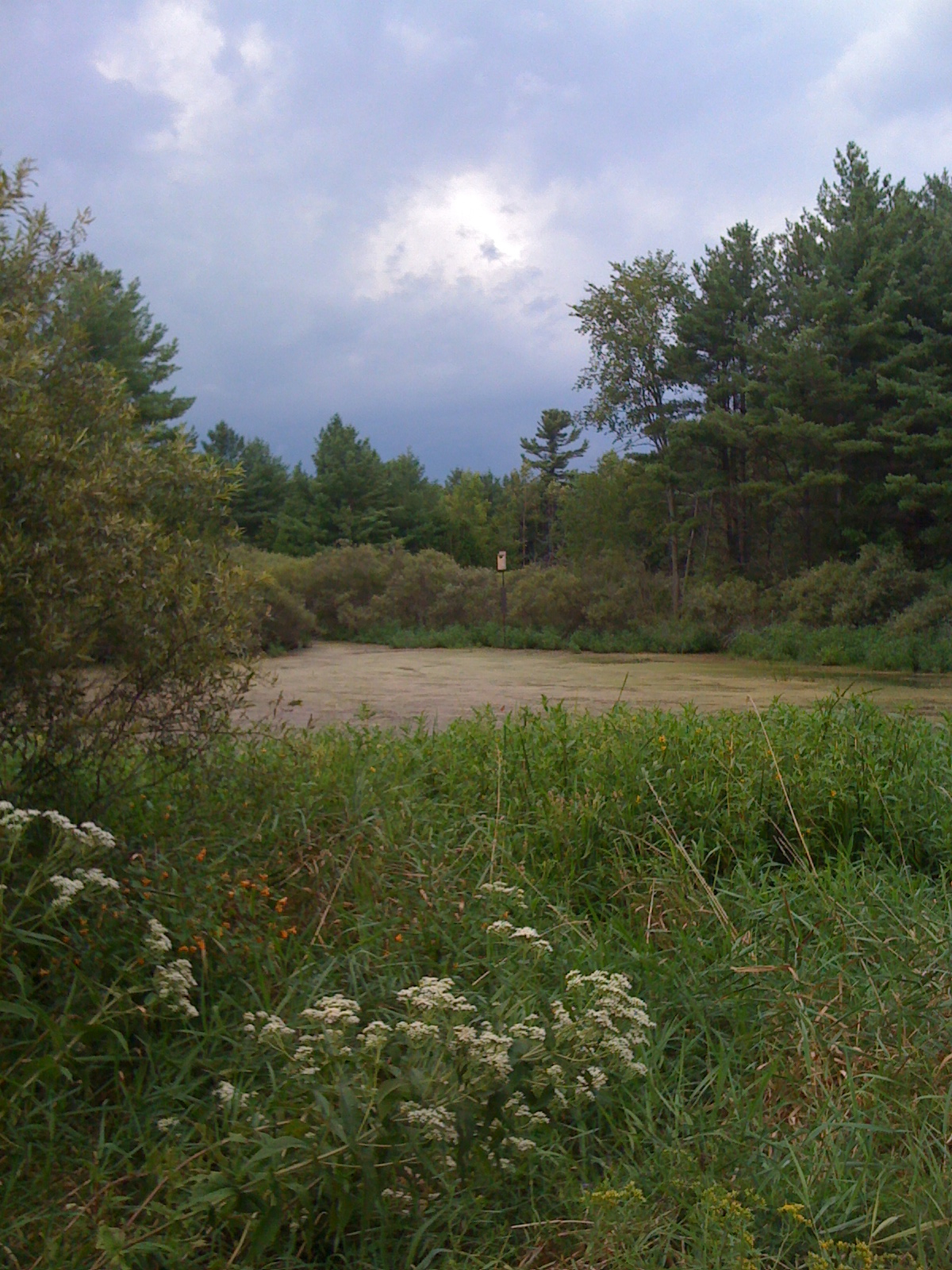
- Little Cataraqui Creek Conservation Area

- Location within Southern Ontario
- Location: Ontario, Canada
- Nearest city: Kingston
- Coordinates: 44°16′58″N 76°30′46″W
- Area: 394 hectares (970 acres)
- Governing body: Cataraqui Region Conservation Authority

Little Cataraqui Creek Conservation Area is a 394-hectare (970-acre) conservation area located north of the city of Kingston, Ontario, Canada, and is managed by the Cataraqui Region Conservation Authority.

The Little Cataraqui Creek flows through the area and a reservoir has been built for water control and wildlife management purposes. It has an outdoor centre, and houses the headquarters of the Cataraqui Region Conservation Authority. In the winter the conservation area is popular for ice skating, cross country skiing, snowshoeing, and chickadee feeding. In the summer, several day camps operate, and popular activities are canoeing, kayaking and bird-watching. Composed of pond, marsh, field, and forest habitats, a diverse collection of animal and plant species can be found.
