= Cataraqui =

Cataraqui may refer to:

- Cataraqui (ship), a ship which was wrecked near King Island, Tasmania, Australia, in 1845 with the loss of 406 lives
- SS Fort Cataraqui, a 1942 Canadian merchant ship
- Fort Cataraqui, the former name of Fort Frontenac

== In Kingston, Ontario, Canada ==
- The original townsite of Kingston, Ontario
- Cataraqui River
- Little Cataraqui Creek
- Cataraqui Cemetery
- Cataraqui Centre, a large shopping mall
- Cataraqui Clippers, a Canadian soccer team which became the Kingston Clippers
