= Florida, Frontenac County =

Florida
- dispersed rural community
- Location in Southern Ontario
- Coordinates: 44°20′02″N 76°41′04″W
- Country: Canada
- Province: Ontario
- Region: Eastern Ontario
- County: Frontenac County
- Municipality: Kingston
- Elevation: 139 m (456 ft)
- Time zone: UTC-5 (Eastern Time Zone)
  - Summer (DST): UTC-4 (Eastern Time Zone)
- Postal Code: K0H 1V0
- Area codes: 613, 343

Florida is a dispersed rural community in the northwest corner of the municipality of Kingston, Frontenac County in Eastern Ontario, Canada. It lies at an elevation of 139 metres (456 ft) and is adjacent to (northwest of) Odessa Lake.
