= Golden Dome =

Golden Dome may refer to:

- Golden Dome (missile defense system), a planned American missile defense system
- Golden Dome (Monaca), a multi-purpose geodesic domed arena in Monaca, Pennsylvania
- The Golden Domes on the Fairfield, Iowa campus of Maharishi University of Management
- Golden Dome Athletic Center, an athletic facility owned and operated by Rutgers University–Newark, in Newark, New Jersey

Gold Dome may refer to:

- Gold Dome, a geodesic-shaped cultural center in Oklahoma City, Oklahoma
- Gold Dome (Centenary), on the campus of Centenary College of Louisiana in Shreveport, Louisiana, United States
- Georgia State Capitol, is referred to as the "Gold Dome" because of the gold leaf applied to the structure
- The Colorado State Capitol in Denver, whose distinctive golden dome contains real gold leaf
- Assassins' Gate, a landmark on the International Zone in Baghdad, Iraq, known as The Golden Dome
- Dome of the Rock, an Islamic shrine of great religious significance in Jerusalem
- Main Administration Building (University of Notre Dame), at the University of Notre Dame, is referred to as the Golden Dome

== See also ==
- Gould Dome
- Dome (disambiguation)
