= Kingston Secondary School =

Location
- 145 Kirkpatrick Street; Kingston, Ontario, K7K 2P4; Canada; 44.2542°N 76.5028°W

Information
- School type: Secondary
- Founded: 2020; 6 years ago
- School board: Limestone District School Board
- Principal: Darren Seymour
- Grades: 7–12
- Language: English, French, Spanish
- Colours: Blue, black and white
- Mascot: Black bear
- Website: https://kss.limestone.on.ca/

Kingston Secondary School (KSS) is a high school located in Kingston, Ontario, Canada. After the closing of Kingston Collegiate and Vocational Institute, considered the oldest public secondary school in Ontario and the second oldest in Canada, and Queen Elizabeth Collegiate and Vocational Institute students from both schools were phased into KSS. As of 2023, KSS accommodates 1,340 students, with approximately 240 being in middle school and 1,100 in secondary school.

== History ==
Kingston Secondary School opened to students on December 15, 2020, merging students from the closed Kingston Collegiate and Vocational Institute (KCVI) and Queen Elizabeth Collegiate and Vocational Institute (QECVI). Construction of KSS began in 2017 after the demolition of QECVI that year. The school was planned to be open to students in the 2018–19 school year, though opening was then delayed to 2019–20 school year. Due to the COVID-19 pandemic, the date was further pushed back and the school finally opened midway through the 2020-21 school year.

== See also ==
- Education in Ontario
- List of secondary schools in Ontario
