= Millhaven Creek =

Millhaven Creek ruisseau Millhaven
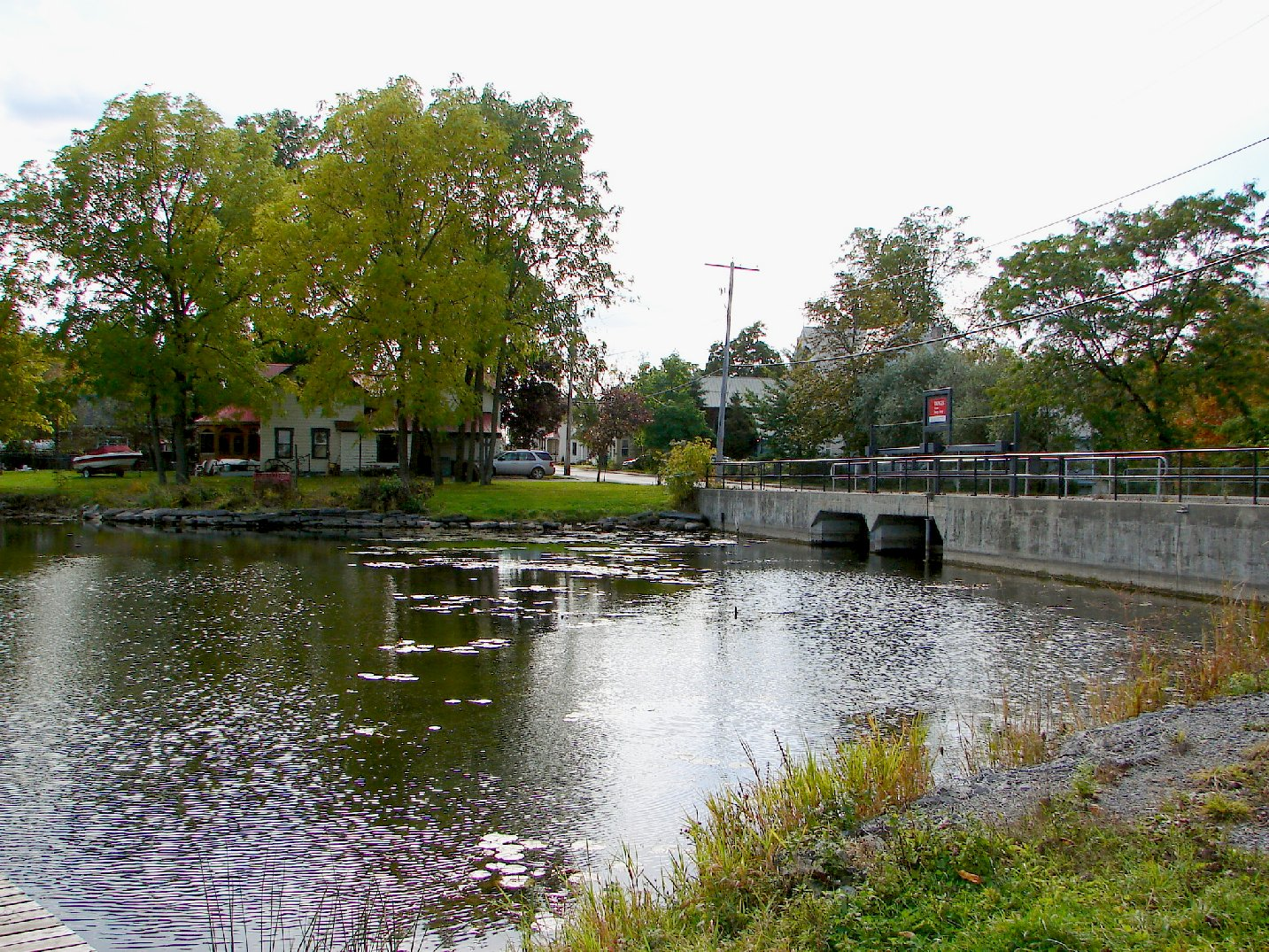

- Location of the mouth of the creek in Southern Ontario

Location
- Country: Canada
- Province: Ontario
- Counties: Lennox and Addington; Frontenac County
- Municipalities: Loyalist; Kingston; South Frontenac

Physical characteristics
- Source: Sydenham Lake
  - location: South Frontenac
  - coordinates: 44°16′42″N 81°06′04″W
  - elevation: 130 m (430 ft)
- Mouth: Lake Ontario
  - location: Loyalist
  - coordinates: 44°11′37″N 76°44′25″W
  - elevation: 74.1 m (243 ft)
- Length: 56.6 km (35.2 mi)
- Basin size: 179 km^{2} (69 sq mi)

Basin features
- Progression: Lake Ontario→ Saint Lawrence River→ Gulf of Saint Lawrence
- River system: Lake Ontario drainage basin
- Waterbodies: Odessa Lake

Millhaven Creek (French: ruisseau Millhaven) is a stream in the municipalities of Loyalist, Lennox and Addington County, and South Frontenac, Frontenac County, and the single-tier municipality of Kingston in eastern Ontario, Canada. It is a tributary of Lake Ontario and is under the auspices of the Cataraqui Region Conservation Authority.

== Course ==
Millhaven Creek begins at the outflow over the Sydenham Lake Dam from Sydenham Lake at the community of Sydenham in South Frontenac at an elevation of 130 metres (430 ft) and heads southwest, reaching Peters Lake. It leaves the lake at the southwest continuing to head southwest, flows under Frontenac County Road 38 at the community of Murvale (where the sign on the road reads "Murvale Creek"), enters the northwest corner of Kingston, and reaches the northeast end of Odessa Lake. The creek enters Loyalist at the lake, leaving that lake at the southwest end and continuing southwest. It flows under Ontario Highway 401 at the community of Odessa, passes over Millhaven Dam, continues southwest through the communities of Asselstine and Link's Corners, then turns abruptly southeast then south, passes under Ontario Highway 33 at the community of Millhaven and reaches Lake Ontario at an elevation of 74.1 metres (243 ft).

== Recreation ==
The Purdy water access point, for launching canoes and other small craft, is located on the creek at Murvale.
