= Goulds =

Goulds may refer to:

- Goulds, Florida, United States
- Goulds, Newfoundland and Labrador, Canada

== See also ==
- Gould (disambiguation)
- Goulds Pumps
- Goulds Road
