= Johan Jost Herkimer =

Johan Jost Herkimer (Herchmer or Hercheimer; c. 1732 – August 1795 ) was a Loyalist born c. 1732, the second of five sons of Johan Jost Herkimer and Anna Catherine Petri of German Flatts, Province of New York. He was the younger brother of the American Patriot General Nicholas Herkimer.

== Loyalist ==
Like his brother Nicholas, Johan was an established landowner and an officer in the Tryon County militia. Unlike his brother, he decided to stand for the British King when the American War of Independence broke out. This decision alienated him from his elder brother Nicholas who sided with the new Continental Congress and he was sorely tested by social ostracism. Because of his actions, Johan spent time in patriot jails between 1775 and 1777, and was subjected to house arrest. In March 1777 he managed to escape and made his way to Fort Niagara. His popularity with the Indians and his knowledge of native customs resulted in his being attached to the Indian Department with the rank of captain.

== St. Leger's expedition ==
In the summer of 1777 he returned to New York as part of St. Leger's expedition under the command of General Barry St. Leger. He participated in the expedition as overseer of boats, and he and Captain Rouville of the Canadians successfully broke up the Patriots' blockade of Wood Creek. He was also present at the siege of Fort Stanwix and the battle of Oriskany on 6 August 1777 where the British and their Mohawk allies ambushed American forces on their way to relieve Fort Stanwix. His brother, Nicholas, was severely wounded at this battle as he commanded the American Militia and died ten days later.

== Refugee in Canada ==
Johan Jost Herkimer found permanent refuge in Canada. His wife, Mary, applied for permission to join him in his new country but New York Governor George Clinton refused, saying that no Loyalist women or children would be permitted to leave until the captives taken by Butler and Brant in their raids had been returned. The New York Legislature passed laws in October 1779 confiscating the property of Loyalists. Johan Jost Herkimer was through a Bill of Attainder declared a traitor and his lands declared forfeited to the state. He was banished from New York.

In February 1780, at the command of the governor of the Province of Quebec, General Frederick Haldimand, Herkimer served as boat-master in the Commissariat at Coteau-du-Lac, Quebec, providing stores and supplies for the British Army posts. Despite an inauspicious start, where he hired the wrong people for the job and allegedly spoke too familiarly with an American prisoner regarding affairs of state, it was reported that he rendered good service.

Captain Herkimer and his family settled at Cataraqui (modern Kingston, Ontario) in the mid-1780s and served in the Frontenac Militia. For his service to the Crown he was granted a land allotment of 3,450 acres in the township west of the town, and two in the town. The lots in the township west of the town included what is now Lemoine Point, which at one time was known as "Herkimer's Nose".

The rest of his days were spent in prosperity and peace and he and Mary had seven children. His four sons were George, Lawrence, Nicholas, and Jacob; and his three daughters were Mary, Jane and Catharine. He died in Kingston in 1795; his wife Mary died ten years later.

== Legacy ==
Today, Herkimer Street in Hamilton, Ontario bears his family name. This came about when his daughter Mary married Robert Hamilton of Queenston and thereby became the stepmother of John George Hamilton, the founder of the city of Hamilton, Ontario. When George Hamilton was building the city that bears his name in the early 1800s, he named one of the new streets Herkimer Street in her honour.
