= Collins Bay, Ontario =

Community and natural harbour in Kingston, Ontario

Coordinates: 44°14′N 76°37′W

Collins Bay is a bay and natural harbour, as well as a community, within the western part of the municipality of Kingston, Ontario, Canada. Collins Bay was at one time a small village, but it became absorbed by the city of Kingston. Now Collins Bay consists mostly of residential subdivisions (Highgate Park, Lawrence Park, Ridgewood Estates), a large conservation area (Lemoine Point), Kingston Norman Rogers Airport, and areas of agricultural land. The Collins Bay marina is situated on the bay itself. To the east is a large federal penitentiary, Collins Bay Institution.

Collins Bay was named after the original surveyor of the region, John Collins.

As of the 2011 census, the population in the residential subdivisions is middle class (average income ~100000), mostly married couples or families (mostly 2-4 persons) owning a single-detached house.

== Notable people ==
- Harry Sinden, coach of Team Canada 1972
