= Odessa Lake (Ontario) =

Lake in Eastern Ontario, Canada

- lac Odessa
- Location of the lake in Southern Ontario
- Location: Kingston and Loyalist, Ontario
- Coordinates: 44°18′51″N 76°41′13″W
- Part of: Lake Ontario drainage basin
- Primary inflows: Millhaven Creek
- Primary outflows: Milhaven Creek
- Basin countries: Canada
- Surface area: 225.67 ha (557.6 acres)
- Surface elevation: 123 m (404 ft)

Odessa Lake (French: lac Odessa) is a lake in the municipalities of Kingston and Loyalist, right next to the village of Odessa in eastern Ontario, Canada. It is in the Lake Ontario drainage basin.

Odessa Lake has an area of 225.67 hectares (557.6 acres) and lies at an elevation of 123 metres (404 ft). The settlement of Florida lies just northwest of the lake. The primary inflow, at the northeast, and outflow, at the southwest, is Millhaven Creek, which flows to Lake Ontario.

== See also ==
There is another lake named "Odessa Lake" in subalpine zone of the Rocky Mountain National Park in Colorado.
