= Loughborough Public School =

Location
- 4330 Wheatley Street; Sydenham, Ontario, K0H 2T0; Canada
- Coordinates: 44.407°N 76.6°W

Information
- School type: Primary and Intermediate
- School board: Limestone District School Board
- Grades: K-8
- Language: English, French
- Area: Sydenham, Ontario
- Website: loughborough.limestone.on.ca

Loughborough Public School is a junior kindergarten through grade eight school in Sydenham, Ontario adjacent to Sydenham High School. It is part of the Limestone District School Board.

The Loughborough school building was constructed over 100 years ago. Since then, it has undergone two expansions and renovations. The most recent change was in 1993. At that time, the front entrance was reconstructed, a new library was built, the design of the upper level facility office space was improved, and new classrooms were built.

In 2002, Queen's University awarded the Associate School of the Year Award to the Loughborough School.

Loughborough Public School created the annual one-day Girls Active Living and Sport (G.A.L.S.) conference. After learning about G.A.L.S., Oprah Winfrey initiated a contest for student leaders setting healthy examples.
