= Lemoine Point Conservation Area =

Protected area in Kingston, Ontario, Canada

Coordinates: 44.225°N 76.612°W

Lemoine Point Conservation Area is a 136-hectare (340-acre) recreational conservation area at the west end of Kingston, Ontario. The area is bordered by Collins Bay on the north and west sides, Lake Ontario on the south and Kingston/Norman Rogers Airport on the east.

== History ==
In 1784, Johan Jost Herkimer, a Loyalist, was granted a land allotment of 3,450 acres (1,400 ha) in the township west of the village of Cataraqui (modern-day downtown Kingston) for his service to the Crown during the American Revolutionary War. He also received two acres (0.81 ha) in the village. The township land allotment included what is now the conservation area and became known as Herkimer's Nose or Herkimer's Point. The land remained in the Herkimer family until sold to Captain William Lemoine in 1836. The Lemoine family (after which the conservation area is named) sold the land to William Hugh Coverdale as a summer vacation property. The Cataraqui Region Conservation Authority (CRCA) acquired the current conservation area land in 1975. Part of the land (35 hectares, 86 acres) remains as farmland belonging to the Coverdale family, although the CRCA would like to eventually acquire this land and extend the conservation area to cover all 170 hectares (420 acres).

== Description ==
The conservation area includes a variety of terrain, including deciduous woodlands, 2.5 kilometres (1.6 mi) of shoreline, marshland, fields and grassy areas. Picnic tables, barbecues, and washrooms are available. There are two entrances, each with its own parking lot, at the north and south ends of the conservation area. Most trails are quite flat; several of them are wide and smooth enough to be wheelchair accessible. A variety of wildlife may be seen in the conservation area, including birds, insects, snakes, and mammals ranging from chipmunks and squirrels to deer.

== Image gallery ==
Gallery of the variety of terrain in Lemoine Point Conservation Area
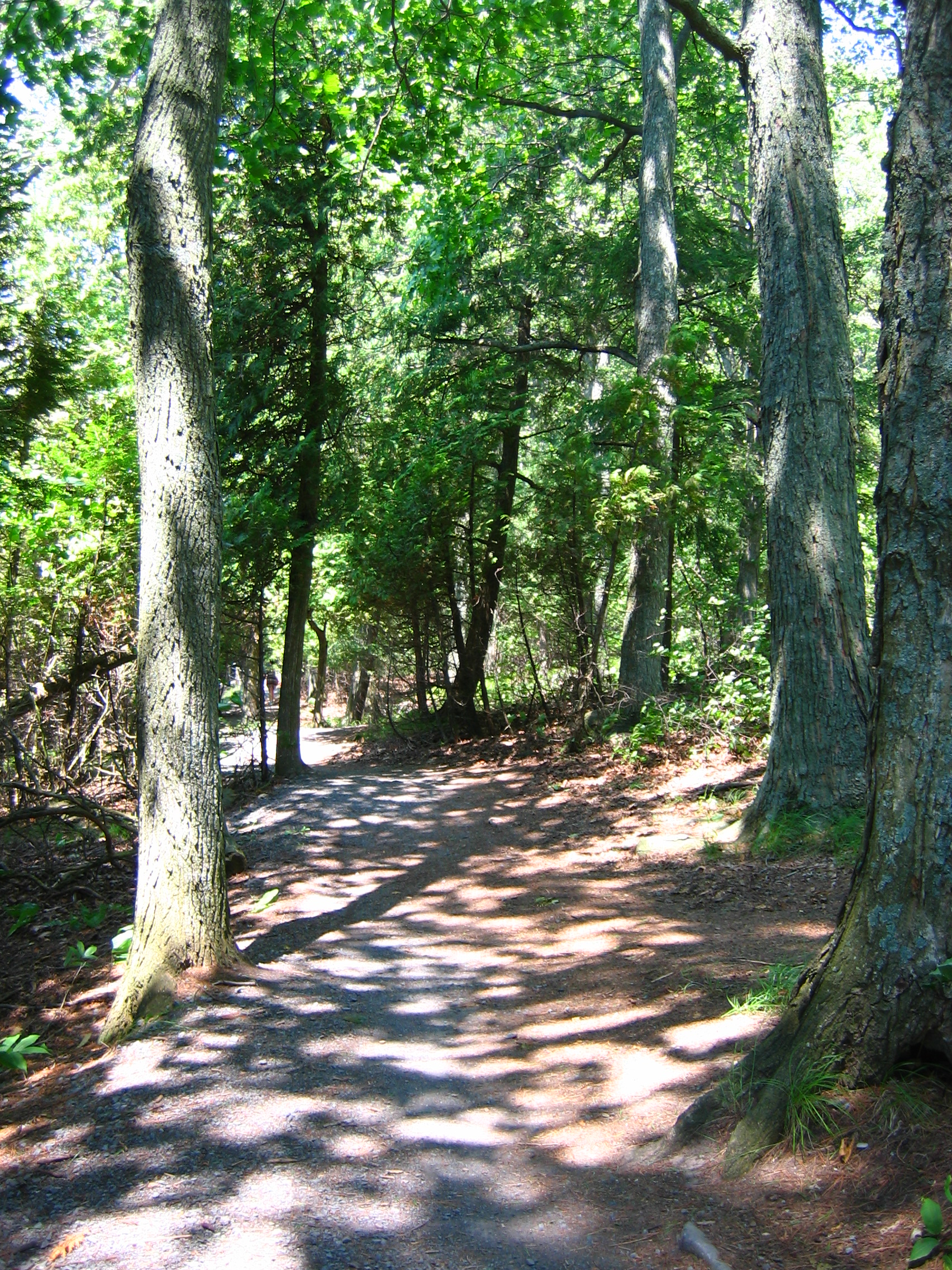
Woodland trail near the shore of Lake Ontario

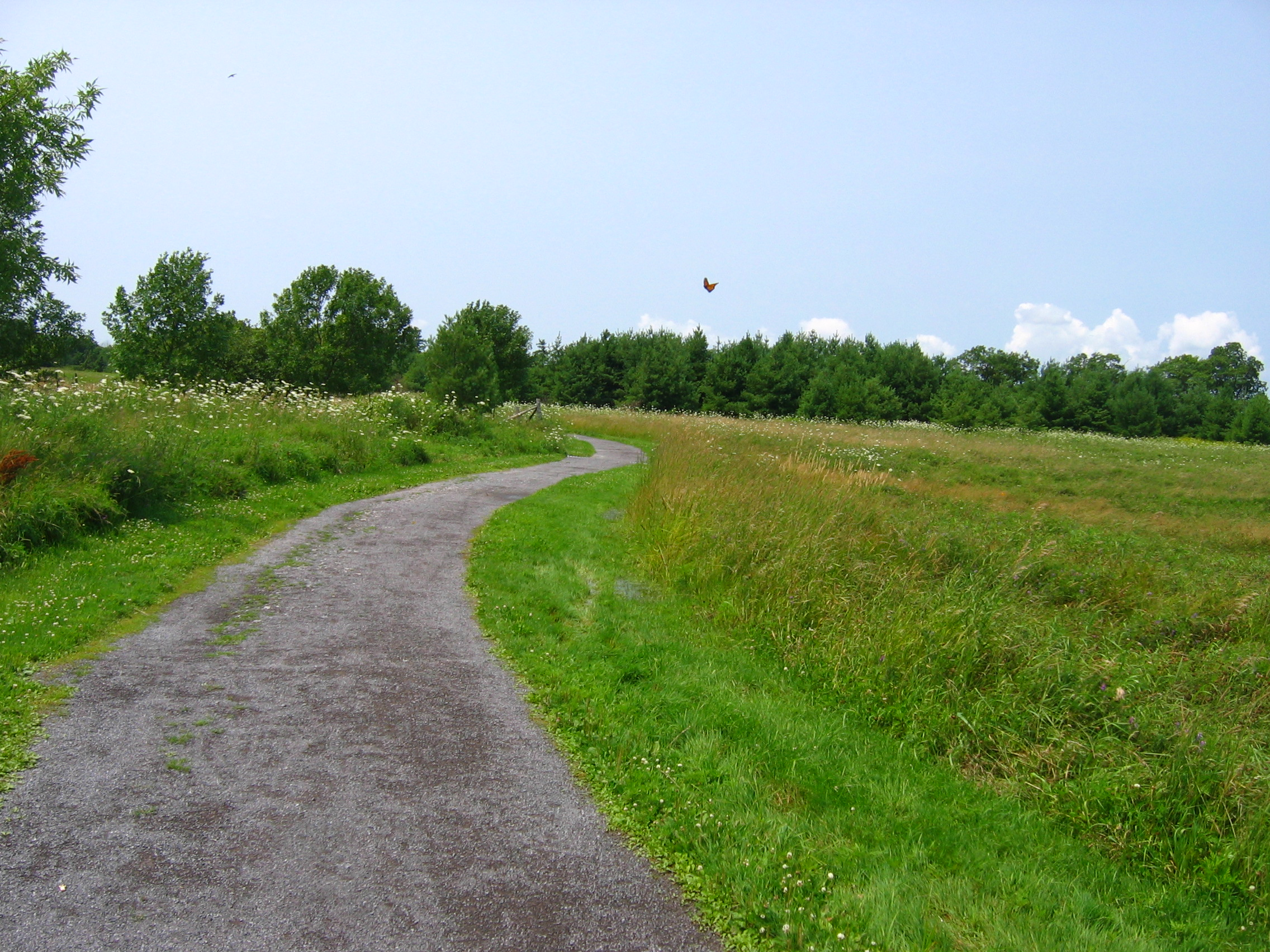
Trail through an open field near the airport

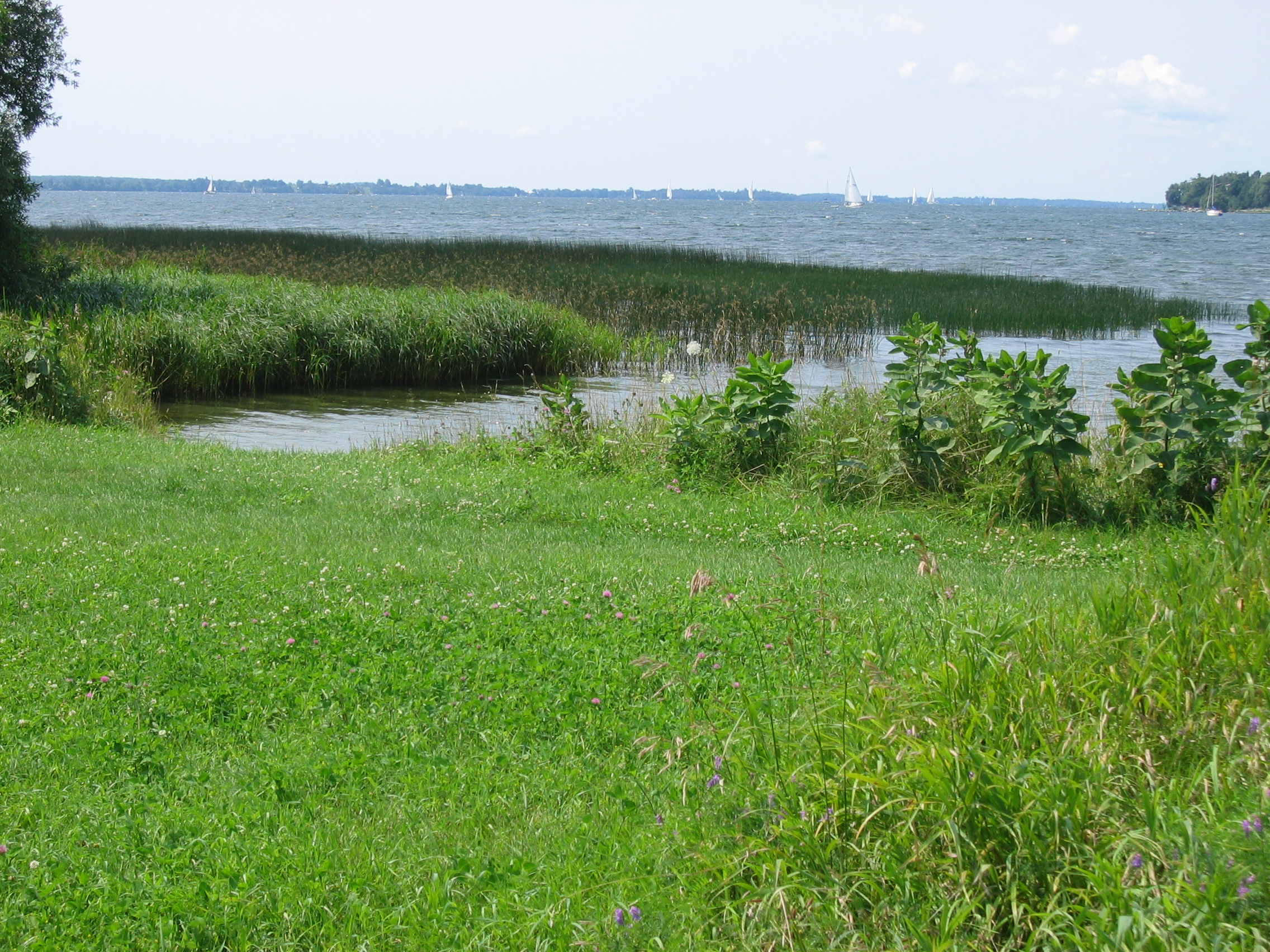
Marshy shoreline on Collins Bay

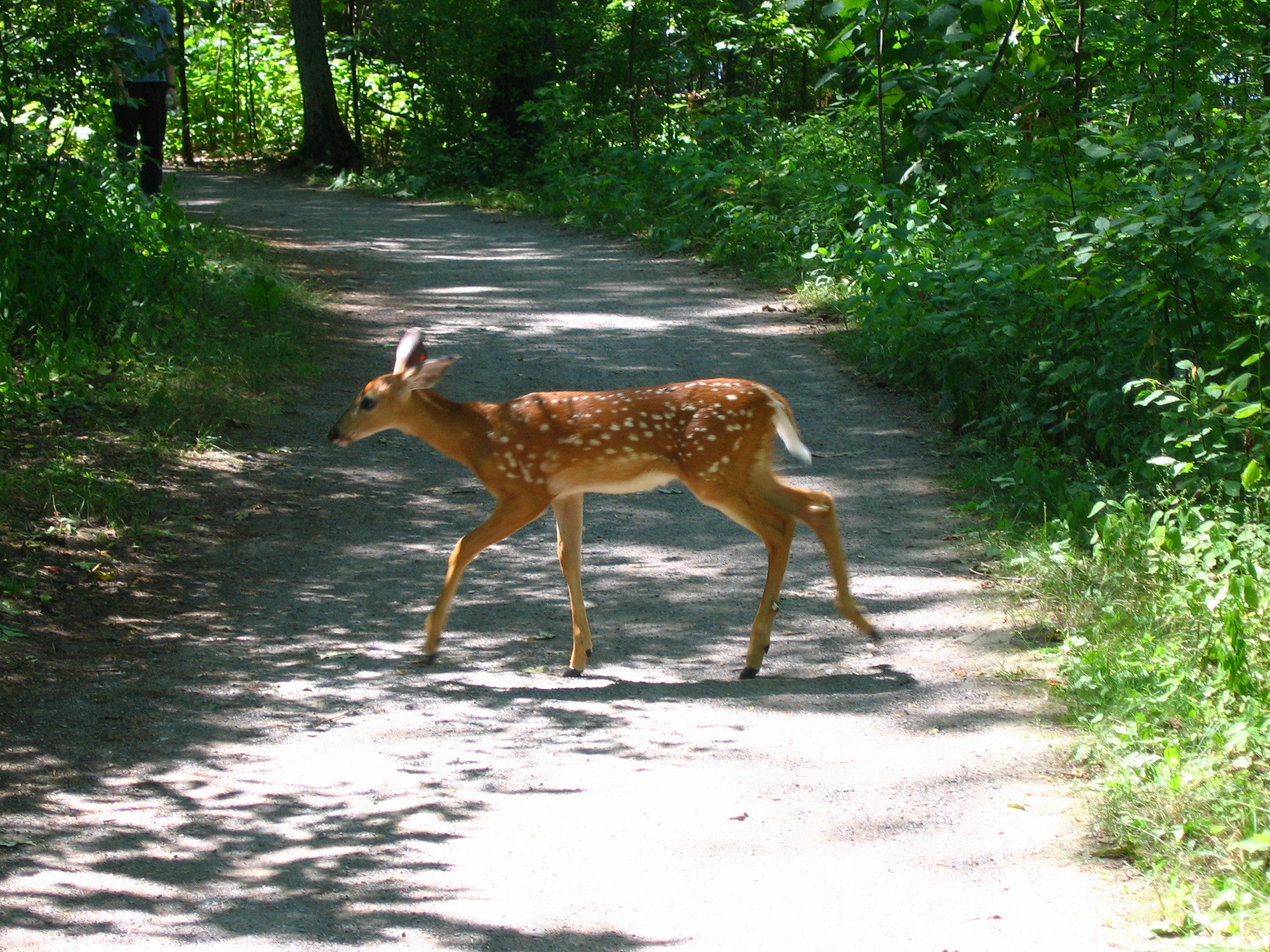
Deer crossing the broad trail

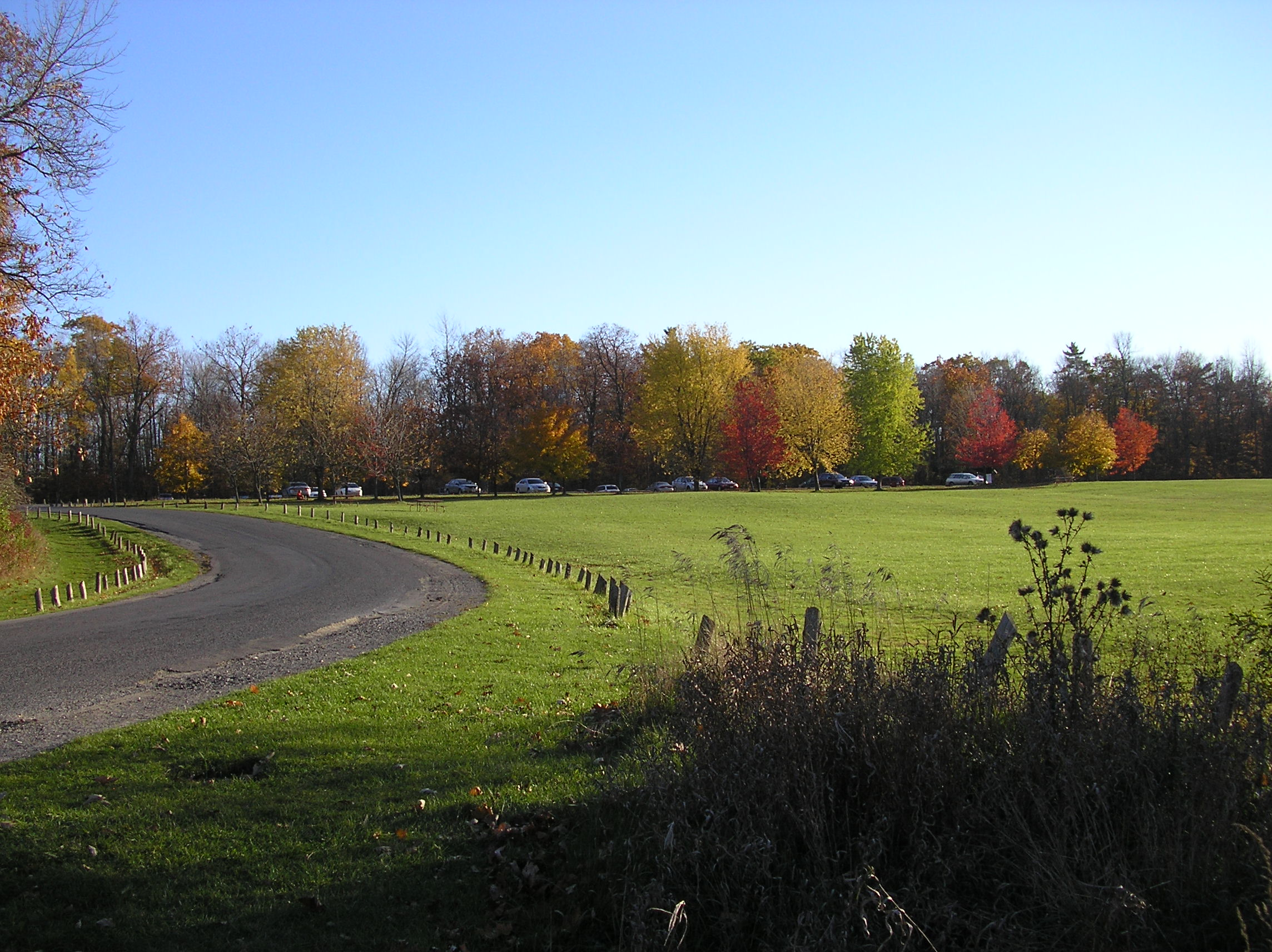
Main parking lot
