= Kingston Community Credit Union =

Canadian credit union

Kingston Community Credit Union Limited
- Type: Credit Union
- Industry: Financial services
- Founded: October 28, 1957 in Kingston, Ontario, Canada
- Headquarters: Kingston, Ontario, Canada
- Number of locations: 3 Branches (2023)
- Area served: Kingston, Ontario
- Key people: Jon Dessau, Chief Executive Officer; David Bull, Chief Financial Officer/Credit Manager; Brian Dennie, Branch Manager
- Products: Savings; Chequing; Consumer Loans, Mortgages; Credit Cards; Online Banking
- Total assets: CN$212 million ($267M AUM) (2023)
- Members: 10,000+ (2023)
- Number of employees: 42+ (2023)
- Website: www.kccu.ca

Kingston Community Credit Union Limited. is a Canadian credit union which provides full banking services, loans and mortgages, investment services and business banking in Kingston, Ontario.

The credit union was formed in 1957 as the Kingston Municipal Employees Credit Union. Having merged with the Teamsters Credit Union and The Kingston General Hospital Employees Credit Union, it became a full service community open bond credit union in 1974.

As of 2023, KCCU had CN$212 million in assets and approximately 10,000 members. It has 3 branches in Kingston.

== History ==
=== Kingston Civic Employees Credit Union ===
The Kingston Civic Employees Credit Union was founded by members of the City of Kingston police, fire and municipal services departments and launched October 28, 1957. Alphonse Desjardins assisted CS Coop, the first credit union in Canada outside Quebec. Federal civil servants were prompted by an article in their magazine The Civilian, when it reported on loan sharks charging civil servants up to 200% for payday loans. After the Government of Ontario passed a credit union law in 1928, many credit unions like the Kingston-based institution were formed to ensure access to fair and equitable financial treatment for their members.

=== Kingston Community Credit Union ===
In 1974, Kingston Community Credit Union Limited applied to become an open-bond community Credit Union, having merged with Northern Electric employees Credit Union and having amalgamated with the Teamsters Credit Union and Kingston General Hospital Employees Credit Union (by 1978). Starting from the basement of City Hall with 30 members each putting in 50 cents each, KCCU eventually moved to a location in downtown Kingston on Queen Street and later bought the 18 Market Street location across from City Hall. Since that time, KCCU has been a community bond credit union, open to all residents of Kingston and the greater area. KCCU was a member of Credit Union Central of Ontario which has subsequently merged with Credit Union Central of British Columbia to become Central 1.

=== CEO and awards ===
Jon Dessau became CEO in October 2014 after Blake Halladay served as CEO since January 1, 1980. He previously served as Chief Information Technology officer. He is a co-operative leader who sees the future of the Credit Union as serving the new generation with advanced tools and technology that will bring their access to KCCU to their fingertips.

Halladay had taken over the small credit union and reversed its fortunes from a $3 million deficit in 1980 to more than a $12 million surplus by 2014. Under Jon Dessau the figure advanced to $18.7M (2023). KCCU was the winner of the Kingston Chamber of Commerce Business of the Year in 2009. Halladay was a pioneer in the credit union movement since his involvement with the Liquidity and Stability Task Force in the early 1980s. He and KCCU have won numerous provincial awards for Mentorship, Distinguished service, Youth Involvement, Support for local education, Social responsibility (The Gary H. Gillam Award), Marketing innovation, Outstanding Corporate Charitable Contribution.

KCCU donated $3 Million to the local community from 2007 to 2015 in cash and kind (volunteer hours) donations to local community groups, hospitals and charitable and co-operative organizations.

== Memberships ==
- Central 1 Credit Union
- Interac
- The Exchange
- MasterCard
- Cirrus Network
- Maestro
- Financial Services Regulatory Authority of Ontario (deposit insurance)
- Co-op Network
