= Gould City, Washington =

Unincorporated community in Washington, United States

- Unincorporated community
- Location within Washington (state) Location within the United States
- Coordinates: 46°35′18″N 117°34′41″W
- Country: United States
- State: Washington
- County: Garfield
- Elevation: 1,273 ft (388 m)
- Time zone: UTC-8 (Pacific (PST))
  - Summer (DST): UTC-7 (PDT)
- ZIP code: 99347
- Area code: 509
- GNIS feature ID: 1511002

Gould City is an unincorporated community in Garfield County, in the U.S. state of Washington. It is located at the confluence of North Deadman Creek and South Deadman Creek where the two form Deadman Creek. The townsite, as of 2023, is largely a ghost town and is located in the thin, deep valley cut by the creeks.

== History ==
Gould City was laid out in 1891. A post office called Gould City was established in 1891, and remained in operation until 1913.
