= Sydenham High School, Ontario =

Sydenham High School

Location
- 2860 Rutledge Road; Sydenham, Ontario, K0H 2T0; Canada; 44.407°N 76.6°W

Information
- School type: Secondary
- Motto: Spirit, Heritage, Success (Ludum Facite)
- Founded: 1872
- School board: Limestone District School Board
- Principal: Roxanne Saunders
- Grades: 9-12
- Enrollment: 850
- Language: English, Extended French
- Area: Sydenham, Ontario
- Colours: Red and Gold
- Mascot: Golden Eagle
- Team name: Golden Eagles
- Website: sydenhamhs.limestone.on.ca

Sydenham High School is located about 20 minutes north of Kingston, Ontario in the village of Sydenham, Ontario adjacent to Loughborough Public School. It is part of the Limestone District School Board.

== History ==
Sydenham High School was first established in 1872 and proposed to serve the whole county. During the early years, it was called the Sydenham and Frontenac County Grammar School and managed by a County Board of Trustees. Each year the number of attending students increased until students from outside the county were required to pay fees so that the school could afford to hire a fourth teacher.

In 1927 the school hired its first bus from a private owner to service the Harrowsmith area. By 1947, it was clear the school building needed an expansion to accommodate its growing population, and by 1952 additions cost an estimated $17,000.

A new addition was added in 2014.

== Notable alumni ==
- Jacob Dearbon, CFL player (Saskatchewan Roughriders) profile
- Neil Puffer, CFL player (Edmonton Eskimos) profile
- Mike Smith, NHL player (Edmonton Oilers) profile

== See also ==
- Education in Ontario
- List of secondary schools in Ontario
