= Little Cataraqui Creek =

Watercourse in Ontario, Canada

Coordinates: 44.243816°N 76.539903°W

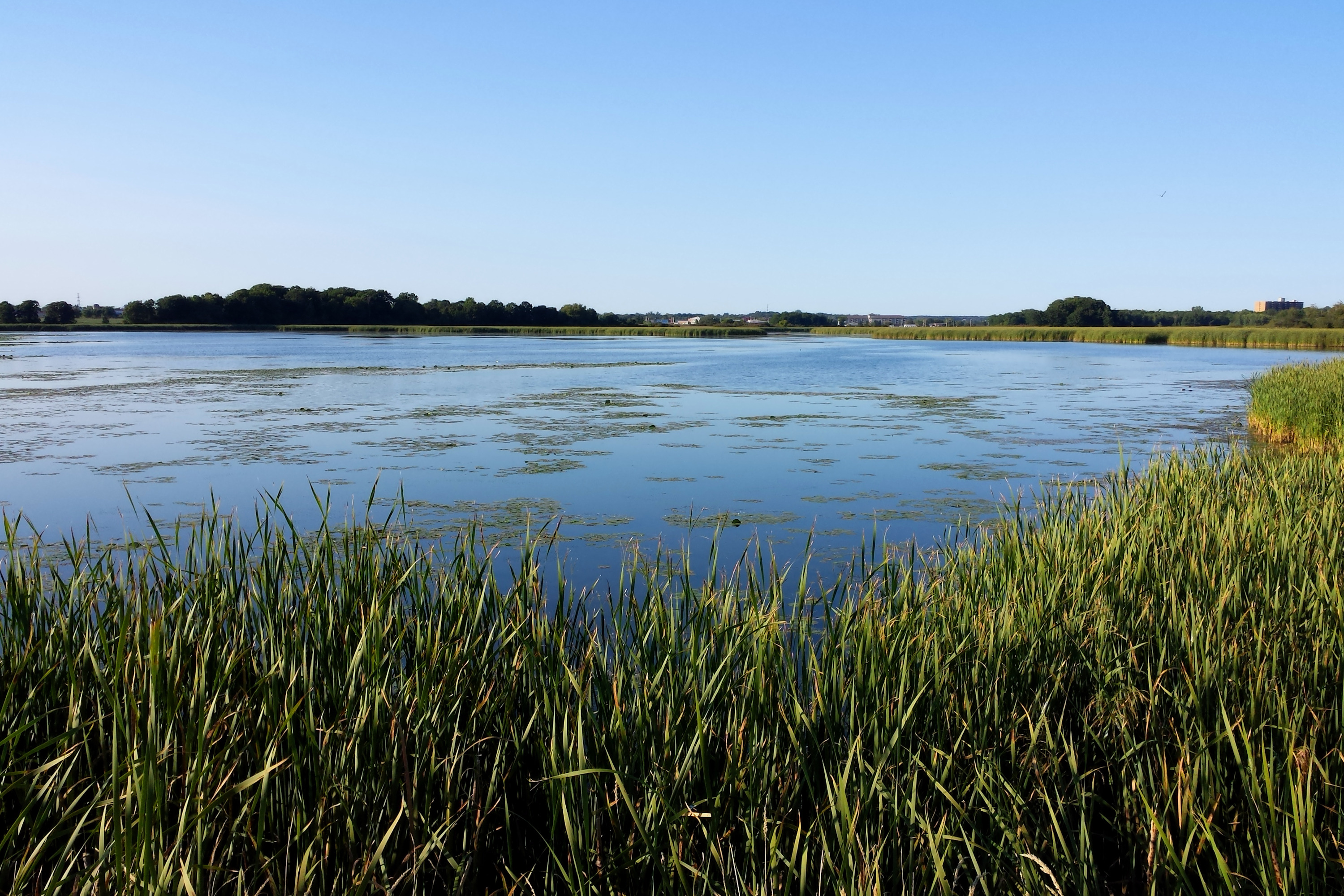
Little Cataraqui Creek near its mouth in Lake Ontario

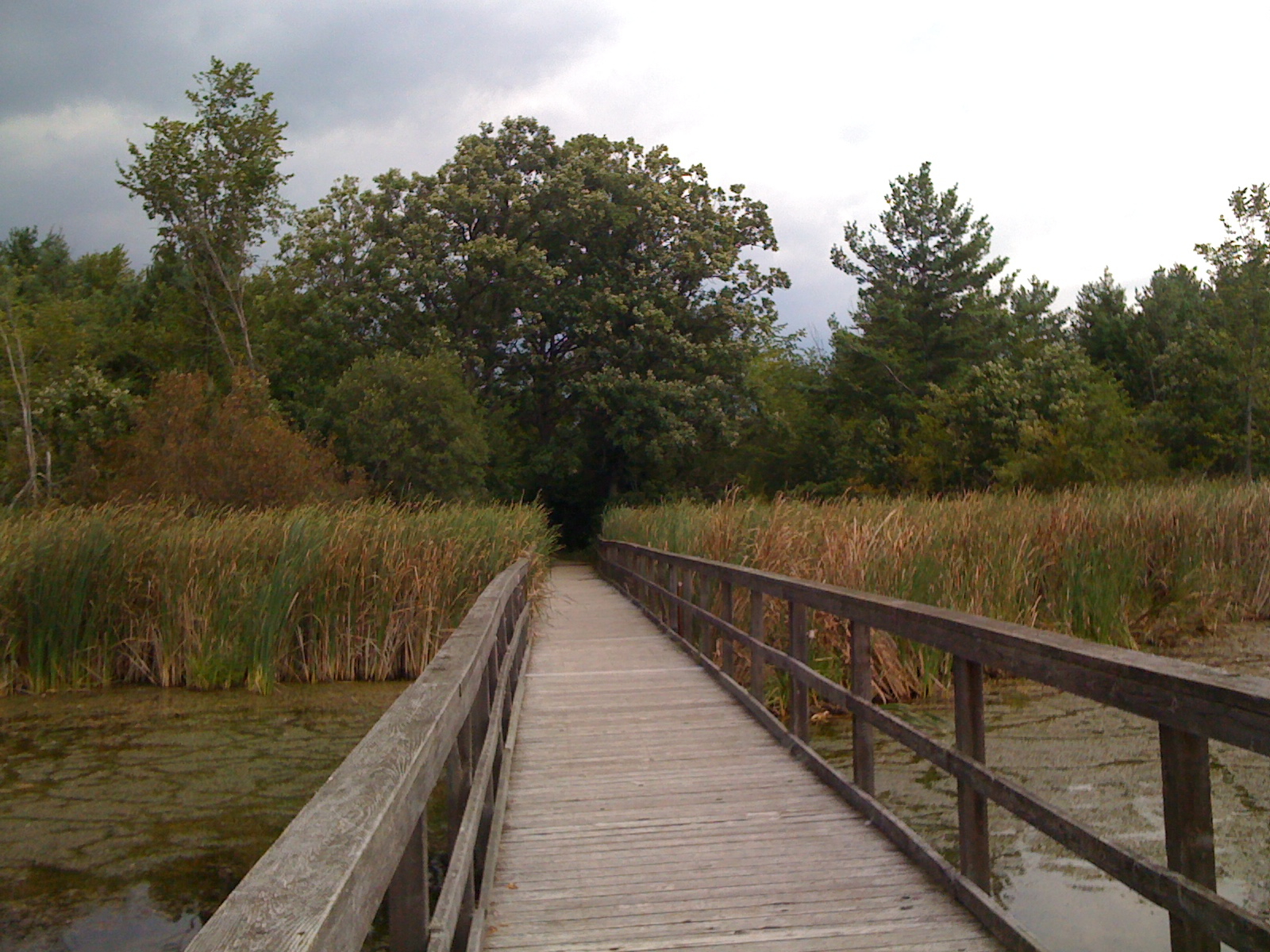
Wetland on Little Cataraqui Creek

The Little Cataraqui Creek is a watercourse, much of which is a semi-urban wetland, that empties into Lake Ontario within the municipality of Kingston, Ontario, Canada. Further inland, just north of Highway 401, the creek has been dammed to form a reservoir that is part of the Little Cataraqui Creek Conservation Area.

The adjective "little" distinguishes the creek from the (Greater) Cataraqui River 4.5 kilometers to the east, which forms the beginning of the Rideau Canal.

Depending on the season, the creek is navigable by canoe or other very small craft.
