= Gould Lake (Van Hise Township) =

- Location in Ontario
- Location: Van Hise Township, Timiskaming District, Ontario
- Coordinates: 47°41′19″N 80°49′21″W
- Type: natural freshwater lake
- Part of: Saint Lawrence River drainage basin
- Basin countries: Canada
- Surface elevation: 358 metres (1,175 ft)

Gould Lake is a lake in geographic Van Hise Township, Timiskaming District, in northeastern Ontario, Canada. It is in the Saint Lawrence River drainage basin.

The primary inlet, at the south, is an unnamed creek. The primary outlet, at the northeast, is an unnamed creek that flows to Diabase Creek and then into Glosser Bay on Obushkong Lake on the Montreal River. The Montreal River flows via Lake Timiskaming and the Ottawa River to the Saint Lawrence River.

== See also ==
- List of lakes in Ontario
