= Limestone District School Board =

School board in Ontario, Canada

Limestone District School Board LDSB

Location
- Limestone Education Centre, 220 Portsmouth Avenue, Kingston, Ontario Kingston, Greater Napanee, Lennox and Addington County, and Frontenac County Canada

District information
- Superintendent: Craig Young, Treasurer
- Chair of the board: Robin Hutcheon
- Director of education: Krishna Burra
- Schools: 70 schools and education centres
- Budget: CA$235 million (additional capital budget of $42,588 million) million (2013-14)

Students and staff
- Students: 21,206 (stable to slowly declining - previous 21 072)

Other information
- Elected trustees: Five urban (U) and four rural (R) Trustees. Term December 1, 2018 - November 30, 2022. Urban: Judith Brown (U); Tom Gingrich (U); Joy Morning (U); Bob Godkin (U); Garrett Elliott (U); Rural: Robin Hutcheon (R); Laurie French (R); Karen McGregor (R); Suzanne Ruttan (R) One rural (R), one urban (U), and one Indigenous (I) student Trustees: Shana Johnson (R); Breanna Roy (I), Tanesha Duncan (U)
- Website: www.limestone.on.ca

Limestone District School Board (LDSB, known as English-language Public District School Board No. 27 prior to 1999) is an English public district school board encompassing a region that includes the City of Kingston and the counties of Frontenac and Lennox and Addington in Eastern Ontario, Canada. The board was founded in a 1998 provincial reorganization of all Ontario school boards. It is an amalgamation of the former Frontenac County and Lennox and Addington County Boards of Education. The board's Chair for 2023-2024 is Robin Hutcheon. The Vice-Chair is Bob Godkin.

The Limestone District School Board serves 21,206 students at 70 schools and centres, employing 2,200 teachers and staff. The district covers a geographic area of 7,719 square kilometres including the townships of Central Frontenac, Addington Highlands, North Frontenac, South Frontenac, Frontenac Islands, Loyalist and Stone Mills, as well as the Town of Greater Napanee and the City of Kingston.

As of September 1, 2014, the board operates 53 elementary schools, 11 secondary schools, the Limestone School of Community Education and other specialized education centres. The community served by each school is indicated in the list below after each school's name. Some students may attend a school outside of the area they reside so that they may take part in a special program. The school board is expecting slowly declining enrollment, particularly of secondary students, until about 2016. A provincial full-day kindergarten program is expanding enrolment in all elementary schools and is now available in all elementary schools.

The board of trustees of the Limestone District School Board has recently built two new elementary schools and one K-12 high school (opened January 2014) within the district. These schools have been built in the Pittsburgh District of the City of Kingston, in the south end of the Town of Napanee and in Sharbot Lake. An expansion of Sydenham High School was completed in January 2014. A number of existing elementary schools in the district will be closed as these new consolidated schools open. Each new elementary school will have an enrolment of between 600 and 800 students.

Program and Accommodation Review Committees (PARC) for Central Kingston and Kingston North presented reports in 2012-13 with respect to changes to elementary and secondary school accommodation. Senior staff made further recommendations based on these reports for consideration by the board of trustees in 2013. Public concerns have arisen about the possible creation of a "school desert" in the central part of Kingston as a result of school closures or changes approved by the trustees in June 2013. The final form of these changes was confirmed after a review by the board of trustees of a number of contributing factors including funding, site availability and technical development issues. The design concept for the new intermediate and secondary school to be located on the QECVI school property in Kingston was approved in December 2015 by the board of trustees.

Limestone's board of trustees are elected officials responsible for the operation of public schools in the district. Trustees are the critical political link between community and school boards. They ensure public schools meet the diverse needs of students in their community. They are elected by the public school taxpayers every four years, during municipal elections and are directly accountable to the community. The current nine-member board will serve until November 30, 2022. Trustees are elected by geographic electoral areas within the area administered by the school board. The board also has three Student Trustees representing urban and rural secondary schools, as well as an Indigenous representative. They serve a one-year term and are elected by the Limestone District Inter-School Student Council each spring.

== Strategic goals of the Limestone District School Board ==
- Improve achievement and success for all students
- Ensure fiscal responsibility and further develop the efficient use of resources
- Foster health and wellness in safe environments for students and staff
- Develop and improve work practice and leadership through professional learning
- Prepare for future system changes and plan for environmental sustainability
- Strengthen communication and engagement with parents/guardians, educational and community partners and the public

== Board of trustees and board committees ==
The chair of the board for 2021-2022 is Suzanne Ruttan. The vice-chair is Tom Gingrich.

All board business is conducted at regularly scheduled board of trustees meetings. They are held on the second Wednesday of each month beginning at 6 p.m. during the school year, except in the months of December, May, June and August, when the dates are determined by the board. Some parts of the board of trustees or committee meetings are held in "private session" (confidential or in camera sessions) if there are items with respect to board personnel, land negotiations or other items to be reviewed privately as mandated by the Ontario Education Act. Private sessions usually take place at the end of the public portion of the meeting.

=== Education/Human Resources Committee ===
The Education/Human Resources committee was responsible for reviewing matters related to the education of and service delivery for students within the jurisdiction of the board. Responsibilities also include ensuring all board employees are valued, respected and principles of fairness and equity are practiced within the provisions of current employment labour laws and board agreements.

As of January 2016, this committee was merged into a Committee of the Whole Model of Governance.

=== Property and operations ===
The committee made recommendations to the board on all of aspects of building and property management, Board operations, information technology and Tri-Board Student Transportation Services.

As of January 2016, this committee was merged into a Committee of the Whole Model of Governance.

=== School Enrollment/Capacity Committee ===
This is a committee of the whole board whose mandate is to review school accommodation data and prepare recommendations for formal Board approval based on Program and Accommodation Review Reports and Senior Staff Reports. The committee has recently reviewed school accommodations in Kinston East, Greater Napanee, the Sharbot Lake area, Kingston West, Kingston North and Kingston Central (2012–13).

=== Special Education Advisory Committee ===
The Special Education Advisory Committee (SEAC) is an advisory committee to the Board. It may make recommendations in any matter affecting the establishment and development of special education programs and services in respect of exceptional students of the Board. This committee provides an avenue for community involvement and receives advice and input from the community. The SEAC Committee is mandated by Ontario Education Act, Regulation 464/97. (Meetings are held on the 3rd Wednesday, 6:30 p.m.)

Its co-chairs are Karen McGregor and an association representative.

=== Environmental Sustainability Advisory Committee ===
Environmental Sustainability Advisory Committee (ESAC) is an advisory committee of the board that provides an avenue for community involvement and receives advice and input from the community. ESAC may make recommendations to the board regarding the establishment and development of education programs and practices of the board related to environmental sustainability:

- to promote environmental sustainability education and awareness throughout the Limestone DSB
- to promote and pursue environmentally sustainable procedures, practices, operations and initiatives through the Limestone District School Board
- to build system capacity for environmental sustainability through enhanced partnerships
- to foster understanding of, and commitment to, the principles of environmental sustainability among LDSB trustees, staff, students, parents, school councils and the public

Its co-chairs are Alec Ross and a community representative.

=== Audit committee ===
The committee is responsible to the board for overseeing the financial accounting processes of the board. This responsibility includes communications with the external auditor concerning the auditor's roles and responsibilities within the financial reporting process. Internal audit functions are provided regionally in collaboration with other school boards operating across eastern Ontario. In 2010 the committee's mandate was expanded to include two outside members with financial expertise. The committee has five members: three trustees (elected for their full four-year term) and two outside public members appointed by the board of trustees for the term of office which ends on November 30, 2022.

Committee Chair is Laurie French.

=== Finance committee ===
A committee of the whole board, it makes recommendations to the board concerning the development of the annual budget, and on any aspects of the board's financial affairs except for audit matters. The committee usually meets in April, May and June.

The committee is chaired by the vce-chair of the board. It makes a recommendation for the annual operating and capital budgets to the full board of trustees in June of each year.

The Committee Chair is Tom Gingrich.

== School Transportation Consortium ==
Tri-Board Student Transportation Services transports over 32,000 students over 95,062 kilometers daily across the region. It transports students from the three regional school boards: Limestone District School Board, Hastings and Prince Edward County DSB and Algonquin and Lakeshore CDSB who are co-owners of the organization. Tri-Board reports to the Property and Operations Committee of the board. The Limestone District School Board provides some administrative services to Tri-Board.

Contact information: voice 613-354-1981 or 1-866-569-6638

Mailing address: 81 Dairy Ave
Napanee, Ontario K7R 1M5

== Elementary schools ==
- Amherst Island Public School -- Stella
- Amherstview Public School -- Amherstview
- Bath Public School -- Bath
- Bayridge Public School -- Kingston
- Calvin Park Public School -- Kingston
- Cataraqui Woods Elementary School -- Kingston
- Centennial Public School -- Kingston
- Central Public School -- Kingston
- Centreville Public School -- Centreville
- Clarendon Central Public School -- Plevna
- Collins Bay Public School -- Kingston
- Denbigh Public School -- Denbigh
- École Maple Elementary School (formerly Sir John A. Macdonald Public School) -- Kingston
- Elginburg & District Public School -- Elginburg
- Enterprise Public School -- Enterprise
- Fairfield Elementary School -- Amherstview
- First Avenue Public School -- Kingston
- Frontenac Public School -- Kingston
- Glenburnie Public School -- Glenburnie
- H H Langford Public School -- Napanee
- Harrowsmith Public School -- Harrowsmith
- Hinchinbrooke Public School -- Parham
- Holsgrove Public School -- Westbrook
- James R Henderson Public School -- Kingston
- John Graves Simcoe Public School -- Kingston
- Joyceville Public School -- Joyceville
- Lancaster Drive Public School -- Kingston
- Land O Lakes Public School -- Mountain Grove
- Lord Strathcona Public School (Kingston) -- Kingston
- Loughborough Public school -- Sydenham
- Marysville Public School -- Wolfe Island
- Module Vanier Elementary School -- Kingston
- Module de l'Acadie Elementary School -- Kingston
- Newburgh Public School -- Newburgh
- North Addington Education Centre Public School -- Cloyne
- Odessa Public School -- Odessa
- Perth Road Public School -- Perth Road
- Polson Park Public School -- Kingston
- Prince Charles Public School -- Verona
- R Gordon Sinclair Memorial Public School -- Kingston
- Rideau Heights Public School -- Kingston
- Rideau Public School -- Kingston
- Sandhurst Public School -- Bath
- Selby Public School -- Selby
- Sharbot Lake Intermediate School -- Sharbot Lake
- Storrington Public School -- Battersea
- Sydenham Public School -- Kingston
- Tamworth Elementary School -- Tamworth
- The Prince Charles School -- Napanee
- Truedell Public School -- Kingston
- Welborne Avenue Public School -- Kingston
- Winston Churchill Public School -- Kingston
- Yarker Public School -- Yarker
  - In 2017 it had 26 students. The building can hold up to 72.

== Secondary schools ==
- Bayridge Secondary School — Kingston
- Ernestown Intermediate and Secondary School — Odessa
- Frontenac Secondary School — Kingston
- Kingston Secondary School — Kingston
- La Salle Secondary School — Kingston
- Loyalist Collegiate and Vocational Institute — Kingston
- Napanee District Secondary School — Napanee
- North Addington Education Centre — Cloyne (Kindergarten to Grade 12)
- Secondary School of Community Education — Kingston
- Granite Ridge Education Centre — Sharbot Lake (Kindergarten to Grade 12 as of January 2015; formerly Sharbot Lake High School)
- Sydenham High School — Sydenham (new addition opened January 2014)

== Closed schools ==
=== Elementary ===
- J E Horton Public School -- Barriefield — closed in 2012
- Lundy's Lane Public School -- Kingston — closed in 2012
- Sharbot Lake Public School -- Sharbot Lake
- Westdale Park Public School -- Napanee — closed in 2012

=== Secondary ===
- Kingston Collegiate and Vocational Institute — Kingston — closed in 2020
- Queen Elizabeth Collegiate and Vocational Institute — Kingston — closed in 2016

== See also ==
- List of school districts in Ontario
- List of high schools in Ontario
