= Gould baronets =

Set index for Gould baronets

There have been two baronetcies created for persons with the surname Gould, one in the Baronetage of England and one in the Baronetage of Great Britain. Both are extinct.

- Gould baronets of the City of London (1660): see Sir Nicholas Gould, 1st Baronet (died 1664)
- Gould, later Morgan baronets of Tredegar (1792): see Baron Tredegar
