= Mount Gould =

Mount Gould could be:

- Mount Gould (Montana) in Glacier National Park, United States
- Mount Gould (California) in Sierra Nevada, United States
- Mount Gould (Plymouth), a suburb in Plymouth, Devon, England
- Mount Gould (Tasmania) in the Cradle Mountain-Lake St Clair National Park, Australia
- Mount Gould (Antarctica)
- Mount Gould Station, a pastoral lease in the Mid West of Western Australia
