= Sydenham, Frontenac County, Ontario =

Sydenham
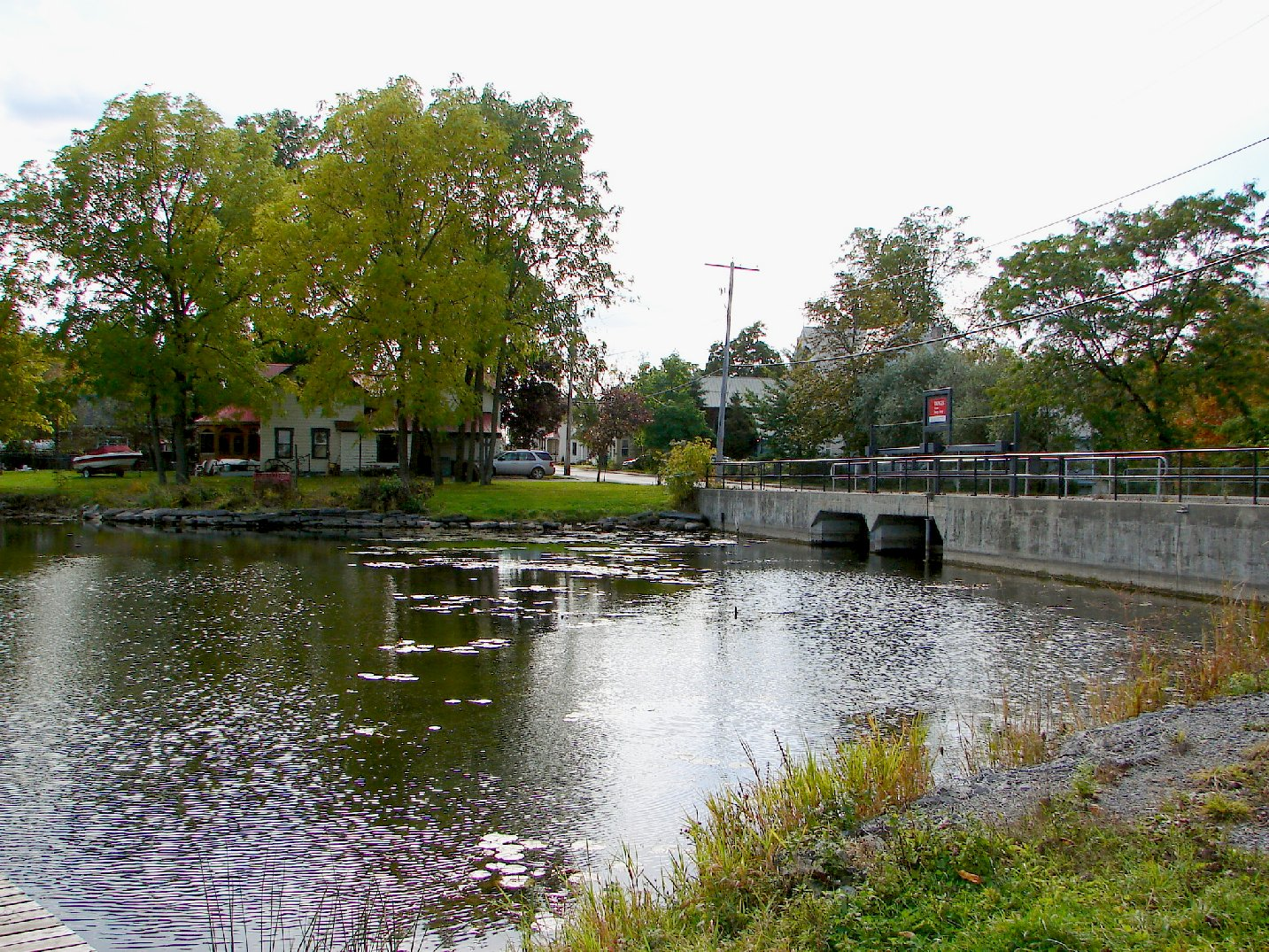
- Interactive map of Sydenham
- Coordinates: 44°24′26″N 76°36′1″W
- Country: Canada
- Province: Ontario
- County: Frontenac
- Municipality: South Frontenac

Government
  - MPs: Scott Reid (C)
  - MPPs: John Jordan (PC)
- Elevation: 70–110 m (230–360 ft)
- Time zone: UTC−5 (Eastern (EST))
  - Summer (DST): UTC−4 (Eastern (EDT))
- Postal code span: K0H 2T0
- Area code: 613

Sydenham, named after Lord Sydenham, is a community in Frontenac County, located in the municipality of South Frontenac. It is situated at the west end of Sydenham Lake and located north of Kingston, Ontario, Canada.

The former Canadian Northern Railway runs through the north end of town, which when the local section was completed, formed the first rail link between Toronto and Ottawa. The abandoned railway right of way is now part of the Trans Canada Trail.

Sydenham once held the township offices for Loughborough Township, but after the neighbouring townships amalgamated, it is now the seat for the Township of South Frontenac.

Although located in a farming community, many of the area residents work in Kingston. Sydenham has more amenities than many of the smaller surrounding towns making it a hub for the region.

== Geography ==
Geologically, Sydenham straddles the boundary of the St. Lawrence Lowlands (limestone) and the Canadian Shield (granite). Frontenac Provincial Park is found just north of Sydenham in the shield rock and sits atop the Frontenac Axis, a part of the shield that extends south and eventually crosses the St. Lawrence River. Mica mining was common in the 19th century and there are many abandoned mines in the area. One area where mica mines can be found is nearby Gould Lake situated between Sydenham and Frontenac Provincial Park.

An annual canoe/kayak regatta is held on Sydenham Lake next to The Point, a popular local public beach, which was purchased by a local women's group in the mid-late 19th century and given back to the community so that there was always a public gathering point. Sydenham Lake drains westward into Millhaven Creek (originating from Gould Lake), which empties into Lake Ontario at Millhaven.

== Culture, recreation, and economy ==
The residents of Sydenham maintain a beach that is located in the east end of the town, on Sydenham Lake. Locals call it "The Point" because the beach and associated park is actually a man-made peninsula on the lake, created by clean landfill. In the summer of 2017, a ribbon cutting ceremony was held at The Point beach to commemorate the renovations that had recently taken place. New additions to the park included renovated washroom/change room facilities, a new climber for children, park benches, and a paved pathway leading down to the beach. All of these renovations created a new and improved accessible park for all visitors.

Those who are not employed at the local schools or who are not running a local farm, are usually employed in Kingston. The two Christian churches within Sydenham are St. Paul's Anglican Church and Sydenham Holiness Church. St. Patrick's Roman Catholic church in located in the nearby hamlet of Railton, and Grace United Church in the village was recently deconsecrated to become The Grace Centre for the community.

Many cottages and summer homes are located in the area, and tourism increases during the summer months. Visitor use at Gould Lake Conservation Area and Frontenac Provincial Park also increases during the summer. The increase in visitors provides revenue to Sydenham.

Trousdale's General Store, which is Canada's oldest, continuously open, same-family-run general store since 1836, is located in Sydenham.

== Education ==
- Loughborough Public school (K-8)
- Sydenham High School (9-12)

== Notable people ==
- Actor Dan Aykroyd and his wife Donna Dixon reside on the land originally settled by his great-grandfather Samuel-Cuthbert Aykroyd in the mid-19th century.
- National Hockey League players Doug Gilmour and Kirk Muller both reside outside of the village of Sydenham. Former Boston Bruins goaltender George Abbott was born in Sydenham on August 3, 1911.
- A number of musicians and artists who are well known in the area have come from, or have lived in the village of Sydenham. These include folk singing group, Night Sun, the bluegrass band The Abrams Brothers, Jason Silver and Celtic music group The Shores of Newfoundland . Visual artists Daniel Hughes and Shayne Dark also live in the Sydenham area.
- John Babcock, Canada's last WWI veteran, was born on a farm near the village.
