= Gould Dome =

Coordinates: 49.91673°N 114.63529°W

Gould Dome is a dome in Alberta, Canada.

Gould Dome has the name of John Gould, an English ornithologist.
