= Cataraqui Region Conservation Authority =

Conservation agency in Ontario, Canada

The Cataraqui Region Conservation Authority is one of 36 conservation authorities in the Canadian province of Ontario. It is headquartered in Kingston, Ontario. The authority was established by an Order in Council in December 1964 via the Conservation Authorities Act, and is a member authority of Conservation Ontario.

The authority is responsible for the management and protection of 11 watersheds in 11 municipalities, the most prominent watersheds being those for the Cataraqui River and Gananoque River. It spans an area from the Bay of Quinte in the west to Brockville in the east.

== Conservation areas ==
Cataraqui Region Conservation Authority manages seven conservation areas:

- Little Cataraqui Creek Conservation Area, Kingston
- Lemoine Point Conservation Area, Kingston
- Gould Lake Conservation Area, South Frontenac
- Lyn Valley Conservation Area, Elizabethtown-Kitley
- Mac Johnson Wildlife Area, Brockville and Elizabethtown-Kitley
- Marshlands Conservation Area, Kingston
- Parrott's Bay Conservation Area, Loyalist
