= Sydenham Lake =

Lake in Frontenac County, Ontario, Canada

- Location within Ontario
- Location: Ontario
- Coordinates: 44.423°N 76.560°W
- Basin countries: Canada

Sydenham Lake is a lake of Ontario, Canada to the east of the town of Sydenham. The lake drains into Lake Ontario through Millhaven Creek to the west.

== See also ==
- List of lakes in Ontario
