= Amherstview, Ontario =

Amherstview
- Unincorporated community
- Location within Ontario
- Coordinates: 44°13′18″N 76°38′55″W
- Country: Canada
- Province: Ontario
- County: Lennox and Addington
- Township municipality: Loyalist
- Founded: 1950
- Named for: Amherst Island

Government
  - Type: Unincorporated

Population (2016)
  - Total: 7,959
- Time zone: UTC-5 (Eastern Time Zone)
  - Summer (DST): UTC-4 (Eastern Time Zone)
- Postal code FSA: K7N
- Area codes: 613, 343
- Highways: Highway 33

Amherstview is an unincorporated community in the township of Loyalist, Ontario.

It is located on the north shore of Lake Ontario and has a population of approximately 7,959 as of 2016. It is adjacent to the city of Kingston and is considered part of the Greater Kingston area. Amherstview is named for Amherst Island, directly to the south in Lake Ontario. When the community was first established in the 1950s, the spelling was generally "Amherst View".

Amherst is a common place name found in many parts of Canada commemorating Lord Jeffrey Amherst (1717–97), Field-Marshal of the British Army, Commander-in-Chief in North America, and Governor General of British North America from 1760 to 1763.

The community is the eastern end of the Loyalist Parkway, a stretch of Highway 33 that travels along Lake Ontario, in an area in which many United Empire Loyalists settled. Amherstview is home to Fairfield House which is itself situated in Fairfield Park on the shore of Lake Ontario. Fairfield House was constructed in 1793 by the Fairfield family who were among the first Loyalists to settle the area. It served as the family home and a portion of the building was also used as a tavern for some time. The impressive wood-frame building is now a museum exhibiting period artifacts and furniture and offering guided tours.

Since Amherstview is part of Loyalist Township, it has no legal boundaries. General boundaries are Lake Ontario to the south, Taylor Kidd Boulevard to the north, Coronation Boulevard to the east (the City of Kingston boundary), and Lennox and Addington County Road 6 to the west.

== Infrastructure ==
Amherstview is home to the Henderson Recreation Centre. The centre houses a public library, a 25 m public swimming pool, a skating arena and an outdoor soccer field. Amherstview is also home to the educational institutions Amherstview Public School and Our Lady of Mount Carmel Catholic School and Fairfield Elementary School, three elementary and middle schools composed of students in grades kindergarten through eighth grade.

Public transportation between Amherstview and Kingston is provided by Kingston Transit.

== Culture ==
=== Historic sites ===
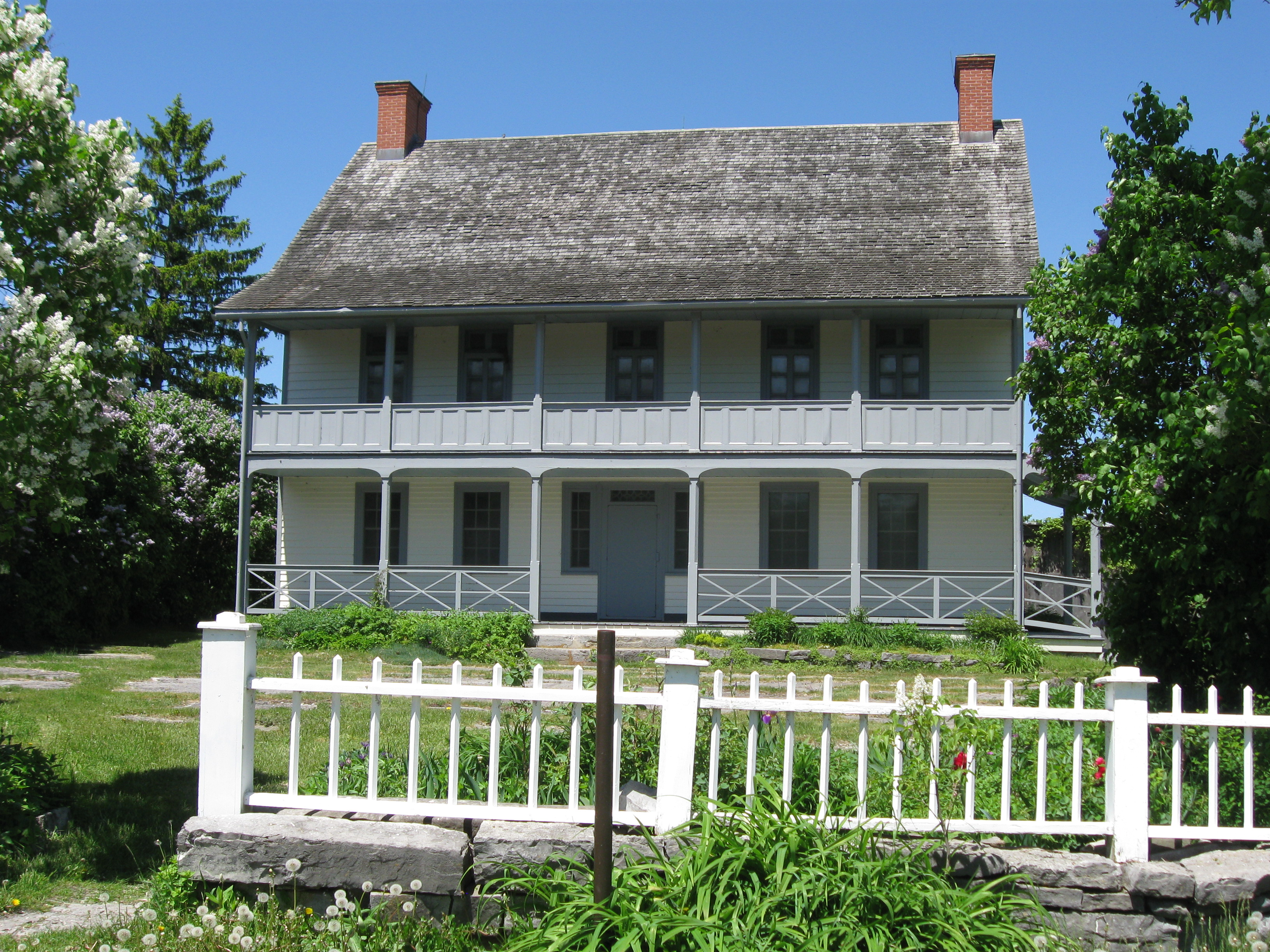
Fairfield House in Amherstview.

- Fairfield House: completed in 1793, this is a house that was built entirely by hand by William Fairfield. It is the best preserved 18th century dwelling in Eastern Ontario. In 1984, it was officially opened to the public and was visited by Queen Elizabeth II during the bicentennial of the Loyalists' settling of Amherstview.
- Joshua Booth House: the Joshua Booth House is called Stonewatch because it was said to have been used as a lookout for United States ships during the War of 1812. The builder, Joshua Booth, served as a sargeant loyal to the British during the American Revolution, was one of the first settlers in the area.

=== Outdoor attractions ===
- Fairfield Park: located close to Fairfield House and includes Fairfield beach along the shoreline, which is a popular place to launch kayaks and canoes. It has a flower garden, picnic tables, playground equipment, and a trail/walking path.
- Great Lakes Waterfront Trail: a 1600 km trail that passes through the community. The Amherstview Route is a trail throughout the community and the Odessa Route connects Amherstview with Odessa, Ontario.

== Education ==
=== Algonquin and Lakeshore Catholic District School Board ===
The Algonquin and Lakeshore Catholic District School Board is a Separate school board that serves the community. There is one school in Amherstview: Our Lady of Mount Carmel Catholic School. There are no secondary schools in Amherstview. Students within this school board are bussed to Holy Cross Catholic Secondary School in Kingston when in secondary school.

==== Our Lady of Mount Carmel Catholic School ====
Our Lady of Mount Carmel Catholic School is a Junior Kindergarten to Grade 8 school and is located on Park Crescent. The school offers French Immersion for all grades. In the summer of 2024, the Ministry of Education approved the Board's request to proceed with the construction of a replacement school. The new school will be built on the current grounds, beside the existing school and will remain a JK-8 school that is dual track, French Immersion and English learning.

=== Limestone District School Board ===
Amherstview is served by the Limestone District School Board. There are two JK-8 schools in the community: Amherstview Public School and Fairfield Elementary School. There are no secondary schools in Amherstview. Students within this school board are bussed to Ernestown Intermediate and Secondary School in Odessa when in secondary school.

==== Amherstview Public School ====
Amherstview Public School is a Junior Kindergarten to Grade 8 school located on Fairfield Blvd. The school was founded in 1958 and serves approximately 650 students. The school also offers French Immersion from Junior Kindergarten to Grade 6. The school mascot is an alligator and the team name is the Gators.

==== Fairfield Elementary School ====
Fairfield Elementary School is a Junior Kindergarten to Grade 8 school located on Kildare Avenue. The school was built in 1973 and serves approximately 300 students. The mascot and team name for Fairfield Elementary School is the Falcons.

=== Public library system ===
The Lennox and Addington County public library system has five branches, including one in Amherstview, located within the W. J. Henderson Recreation Centre.

== Fire and emergency services ==
=== Ambulance ===
Ambulance service in Amherstview is provided by Lennox and Addington Paramedic Service and Frontenac Paramedics.

=== Fire services ===
Loyalist Township's Emergency Services department operates four fire stations, including one in Amherstview.

=== Police ===
Policing in Amherstview is provided by the Ontario Provincial Police. The Lennox and Addington County OPP detachment is located in Odessa.

== Health care ==
The Loyalist Medical Centre is located in Amherstview and is home to the Loyalist Family Health Team, who provide health care for the community. Amherstview does not have a hospital located in the community. The Lennox and Addington County General Hospital located in Napanee serves Loyalist Township. Kingston General Hospital and Hotel Dieu Hospital in Kingston are close by.

== Media ==
=== Print media ===
The Kingston Whig-Standard provides coverage for Amherstview.

=== Radio ===
A 100% volunteer-run community radio station, Island Radio CJAI 101.3 FM, serves Amherstview in addition to various media outlets in nearby Kingston.

=== Television ===
Global Kingston (CKWS-DT) provides news for the community.

== Sports ==
=== W. J. Henderson Recreation Centre ===
The W. J. Henderson Recreation Centre is located in Amherstview and the facility offers a 25-metre indoor swimming pool, a hockey arena and a soccer field.

The Amherstview Jets of the Provincial Junior Hockey League play their home games at the arena.

=== Willie Pratt Sports Field ===
The Willie Pratt Sports Field is a multi-use sports facility in Amherstview featuring ball diamonds, soccer fields, a playground and other amenities.

== Transportation ==
=== Air ===
The closest airport to Amherstview is Norman Rogers Airport in Kingston. At this time, the airport does not offer regular passenger airline service. The closest major airport to Amherstview is the Ottawa Macdonald-Cartier International Airport located in Ottawa.

=== Bus ===
Kingston Transit provides public transit between Amherstview and the Cataraqui Centre in Kingston.

=== Roads ===
==== Highway 401 ====
Ontario Highway 401 passes through Loyalist Township, north of Amherstview. Lennox and Addington County Road 6 connects Amherstview with Highway 401 via exit 599.

==== Loyalist Parkway ====
Ontario Highway 33, commonly referred to as Highway 33 or the Loyalist Parkway, runs through Amherstview along the Lake Ontario shoreline. In 1984, Queen Elizabeth II commemorated Highway 33 as the Loyalist Parkway at a ceremony in Amherstview in honour of the settlers that landed there in 1784.

=== Rail ===
Amherstview does not have a station, however, there is a train station closeby in Kingston. Via Rail's corridor connects Kingston along the main line between Windsor and Quebec City. Kingston is a regular stop on train services between Toronto and Ottawa as well as Toronto and Montreal.

== Notable people ==
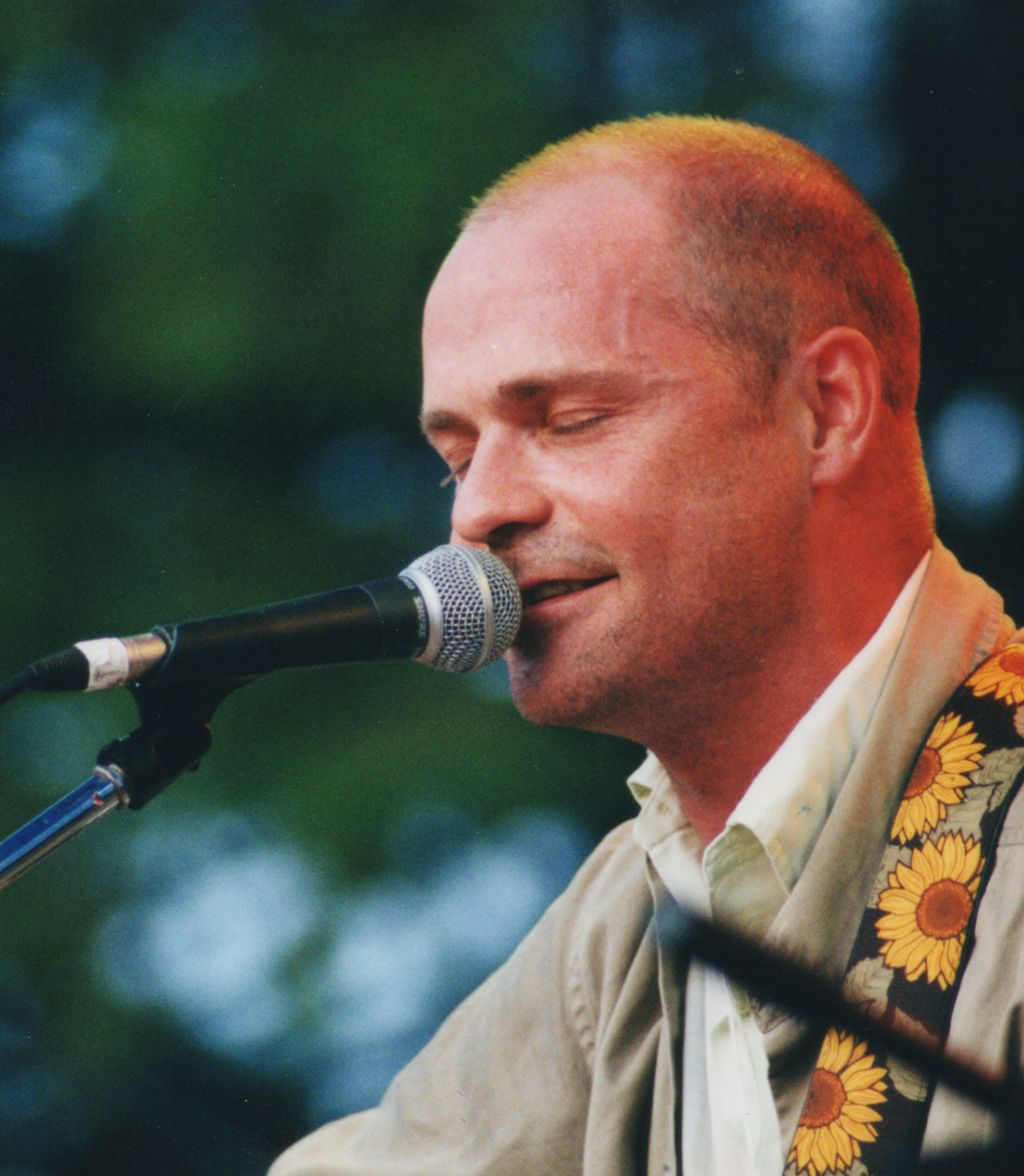
Gord Downie was a singer and lyricist with The Tragically Hip.

- Bryan Allen (1980 – ), professional ice hockey player
- Gord Downie (1964 – 2017), singer and lyricist of the band The Tragically Hip
- William Fairfield (1769 – 1816), business man and political figure in Upper Canada
- James Scott Macdonald (1896 – 1985), career diplomat
- Ryan Malcolm (1979 – ), singer, winner of Canadian Idol season one
- Jay McKee (1977 – ), professional ice hockey player and current head coach of the Hamilton Hammers
- Nathan Robinson (1981 – ), professional ice hockey player
- Mabel Van Camp (1920 – 2012), judge, first woman on the Supreme Court of Ontario

== See also ==
- List of unincorporated communities in Ontario
