= Ernestown Township =

Former township in Ontario, Canada

Coordinates: 44°16′29″N 76°45′54″W

Ernestown is an historic and present-day geographic township in Lennox and Addington County in eastern Ontario, Canada. It was originally known as Second Town because it was surveyed after Kingston Township, but was renamed in 1784 after Prince Ernest Augustus, fifth son of George III. In 1998, it became part of the municipality (township) of Loyalist.

== History ==
Shortly after the American Revolution, some former members of Edward Jessup's Loyal Rangers settled in this area. The town of Bath, originally part of this township, was an important centre for shipbuilding in Upper Canada.

=== 18th and 19th Centuries ===
The first families to settle in the township can be gleaned from records of the first lot purchases. One prominent pioneer family has been the Finkle family of Ernestown. The late George Finkle, of Ernestown said: "My grandfather Dr. George Finkle, left Germany when he was a young man, bought two estates one at "Great" and one at "Little Nine Partners". In adhering to the British customs, he had all his estates, which were valuable at Nine Partners, Dutchess Co. confiscated to the Rebel Government. My father, Henry made his way to Quebec where many German former soldiers had been present. He settled on the front of Ernesttown, on lot six which is the well known Finkle's Point.

Shortly after the war began, being sixteen years old, entered the Engineer's Department, where he learned the use of carpenter's tools and gained considerable carpenter knowledge that was of great use to him by becoming the builder of the first framed building in Upper Canada.

==== Involvement in the building of first steamships ====
George Finkle, son of Henry had three sons, Gordon William, Roland Robinson and Henry. The Finkle's as we have seen elsewhere, were actively engaged in the construction of the first steamboats the "Frontenac" and "Charlotte" having had an interest in the Charlotte, and his eldest son Gordon, is now one of the oldest captains upon the Bay, being attached to the steamer "Bay Quinte" -the old place granted to the grandfather still belongs to the family, Roland Robinson still residing there and the youngest Henry is Postmaster at Bath. His wife was a sister of Capt. John Blecker.

==== The First Court held in Upper Canada ====
It is said that the first court held in Upper Canada was at Finkle's house, which being larger than any at Kingston, or elsewhere on the Bay at the time affording most convenience. Mr. Finkle had slaves and was he first to give them freedom. One of the brothers of which there were three, John, Georg and Henry served seven years in Johnson's regiment.

"Mr. Finkle wrote us, Dec. 11, 1865, he says, 'Being in my 74th year and in impaired health, I am unable to write more'. The kind man soon thereafter was called away at a good old age, like his father and grandfather,...."

=== Twentieth Century ===
The water supply of the community of Odessa within the Township of Ernestown was studied in 1972, which led to the planning of infrastructure improvements throughout the entire township.

Ernestown Township was amalgamated with Amherst Island Township and Bath Village to form Loyalist Township on January 1, 1998.

== See also ==
- Ernestown Secondary School
- List of townships in Ontario
