= Amherst Islander II =

Hybrid electric-diesel ferry boat built in 2020

The Amherst Islander II is a hybrid electric-diesel ferry boat which serves to connect Amherst Island to the mainland across Lake Ontario. It has terminals at Millhaven Wharf in Millhaven, Ontario and Stella Wharf on Amherst Island. It replaces the Frontenac II built in 1962. The Amherst Islander II was constructed with another ferry, the Wolfe Islander IV, using the same hybrid technology for a purchase price of roughly $94 million.

The Amherst Islander II was launched November 2019, from Damen Galați shipyard in Romania. The new ferry has an LOA of 72 metres, a beam of 20 metres, a gross tonnage of 1,230, and capacity for 300 passengers and 42 cars. The vessel is designed to be capable of fully electric operation but is also equipped with twin diesel generators to allow hybrid or full diesel propulsion for maximum redundancy or for sailings at a top speed of 12 knots.

== Service history ==
Despite being launched in November 2019 and arriving in Canadian waters in 2021, the Amherst Islander II faced significant delays before entering service. Originally anticipated to begin operations in early 2020, the ferry remained inactive for over two years due to staffing shortages, infrastructure setbacks, and operational complications.

In 2023, the vessel was temporarily repurposed to support training for its sister ship, Wolfe Islander IV, after a docking incident damaged the Wolfe Islander’s ramp. The Amherst Islander II’s ramp was removed and installed on the Wolfe Islander IV to allow continued crew training, further delaying its own launch.

By mid-2025, the Amherst Islander II had finally begun limited passenger service. However, despite being designed as a zero-emission electric ferry, it continued to operate primarily on diesel fuel due to incomplete charging infrastructure. While intermittent electric charging has been tested, full electrification remains pending.

The ferry is operated by Loyalist Township, with the Ontario Ministry of Transportation covering full fuel costs during its initial service period. Local officials and residents have expressed frustration over the prolonged delays and the environmental implications of continued diesel use.
