= Adnan Virk =

Canadian sportscaster (born 1978)

- Born: Toronto, Ontario, Canada
- Education: Ryerson Polytechnical Institute
- Occupation: Sports anchor
- Employer: MLB Network
- Spouse: Eamon Virk (m. 2007)

Adnan Virk (Urdu: عدنان وِرک) is a Canadian sportscaster for MLB Network who previously worked for DAZN, ESPN, TSN, The Score and WWE. He formerly produced and hosted the weekly podcast Cinephile with Adnan Virk show covering cinema news and interviews with entertainment celebrities. He also formerly co-hosted the football podcast The GM Shuffle with former NFL executive Michael Lombardi.

== Early life ==
Virk was born in Toronto, Ontario; his parents had immigrated to Canada from Punjab, Pakistan. In 1984 the family relocated to Kingston, then in 1989 to Morven, a small town just outside Kingston, where his parents owned and operated a gas station and Zack's Variety store. After graduating from Ernestown Secondary School, where he played basketball and soccer, Virk studied Radio and Television Arts at Ryerson Polytechnical Institute.

== Career ==
From 2003 to 2009, Virk hosted several programs on The Score, and was an associate producer for Sportscentre at TSN. He was also the co-host of Omniculture and Bollywood Boulevard at Omni Television. In 2009, he joined Maple Leafs Sports and Entertainment (MLSE) as a host and reporter for Raptors TV, Leafs TV and Gol TV Canada.

=== ESPN ===
In April 2010, Virk joined the ESPN family of stations in Bristol, Connecticut. After joining ESPN, he became one of three main anchors for Baseball Tonight. During 2014 spring training, he began calling play-by-play for an ESPN affiliate. In the baseball off-season, he hosted SportsCenter and Outside the Lines. He would also fill in for Keith Olbermann on Olbermann. He was the host of a movie podcast Cinephile on ESPN. In addition, he was also the main studio host for ESPN College Football and also hosted College Football Final.

On February 3, 2019, Virk was fired following an investigation regarding leaks of ESPN information to the media. Virk and ESPN later agreed not to pursue litigation against each other.

=== DAZN, MLB Network and NHL Network ===
In March 2019, it was announced that Virk would host the new MLB studio program ChangeUp for DAZN, a subscription streaming media service based in London. In addition, Virk appeared on MLB Network. He also hosted boxing events.

ChangeUp was canceled just prior to the 2020 MLB season. His contract with DAZN expired in 2022.

He is currently co-hosting MLB Tonight as well as appearing on the NHL Network.

=== WWE ===
On April 12, 2021, it was announced that Virk would become the new play-by-play commentator for Monday Night Raw, replacing Tom Phillips. However, after a negative reception from the fans, six weeks later on May 25, he and the company mutually parted ways because Adnan claimed the schedule was too much for him and his family. He was replaced by Jimmy Smith.

=== Silver Screen Debut ===
Virk made his feature film debut in 2023 as a sports announcer in Big George Foreman, a biography about the former heavyweight boxing champion directed by George Tillman Jr.

=== Host of Prime Monday Night Hockey ===
In April 2024, Canadian NHL broadcast rightsholder Rogers Communications announced that it had struck a deal to shift a portion of its rights – specifically the Monday night games played in Canada – from its own NHL on Sportsnet broadcast to Amazon Prime Video for the 2024–25 and 2025–26 regular seasons. In September, it was announced that Virk and Andi Petrillo would co-host the pre-game, intermissions, post-game portions of Prime Monday Night Hockey, which launched with a game in Montreal on October 14, 2024.

Preceded by Tom Phillips	Raw lead announcer 2021	Succeeded by Jimmy Smith
