= Frontenac II =

Ferry on Lake Ontario

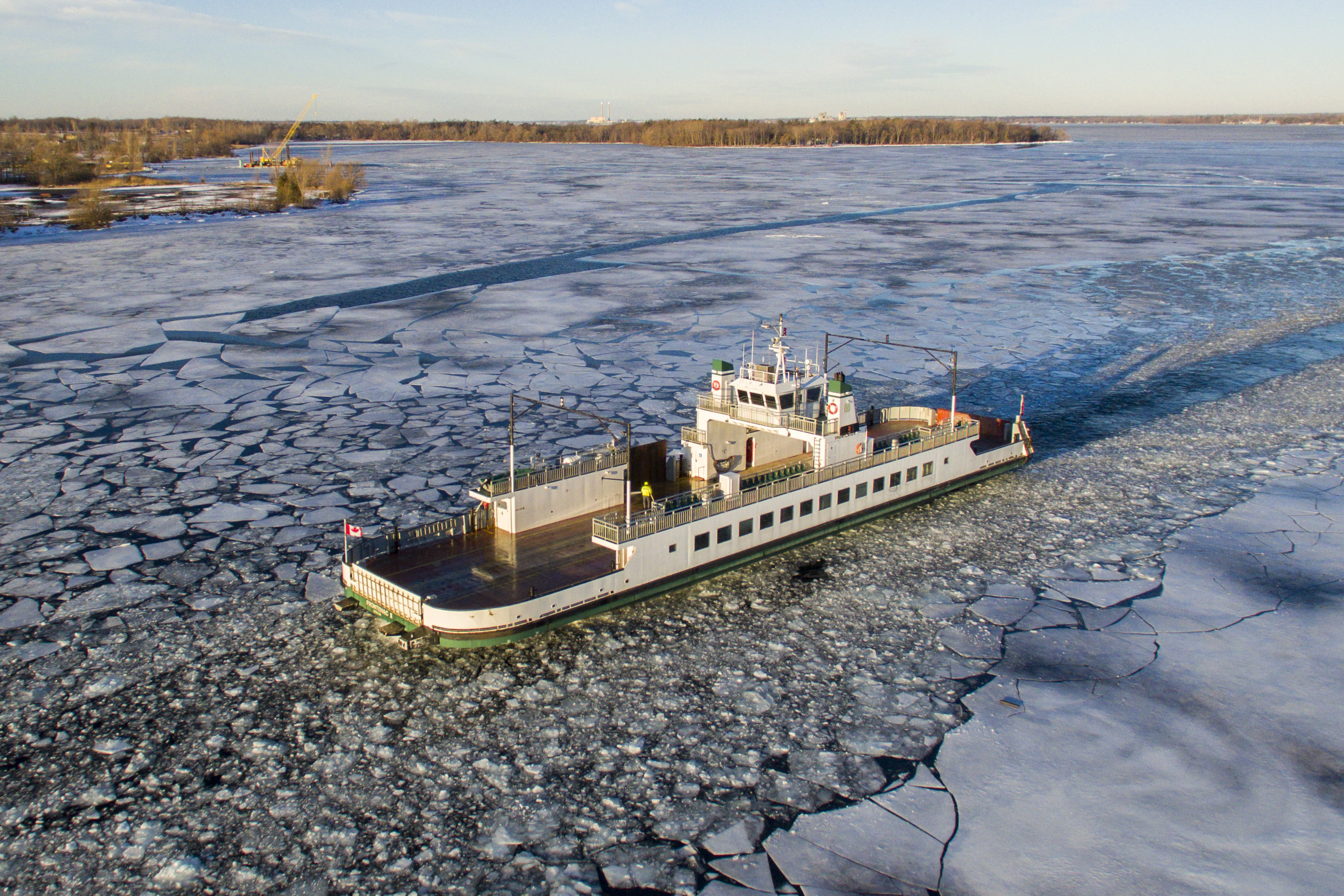
- Amherst Island ferry, the Frontenac II

History
- Name: Frontenac II
- Owner: Ministry of Transportation of Ontario
- Port of registry: (Canada) Kingston, Ontario
- Route: Millhaven, Ontario to Amherst Island
- Builder: Chantier Maritime De St. Laurent Ltee, Saint-Laurent-de-l'Île-d'Orléans
- Launched: 1962
- Identification: IMO number: 5068875; Transport Canada Ship Registry: 313948

General characteristics
- Type: Ferry
- Tonnage: 666.02 GT; 437.43 NT
- Length: 55.08 m (180.7 ft)
- Beam: 13.75 m (45.1 ft)
- Depth: 3.93 m (12.9 ft)
- Installed power: 1,000 bhp (750 kW)
- Propulsion: Two single-screw diesel engines
- Speed: 10.0 kn (18.5 km/h; 11.5 mph)

The motor vessel Frontenac II is a ferry on Lake Ontario, that runs from Millhaven, Ontario to Amherst Island. The trip takes fifteen minutes. The vessel loads at both the bow and stern.

The docks at Millhaven and Amherst Island are equipped with an ice defeating bubble system. As the vessel is constructed entirely of steel, and is not equipped with insulation, winter passages can be very cold.

Ferries to Amherst Island are operated under an agreement with the Ontario Ministry of Transport. Under that agreement if ferry service to nearby Wolfe Island or the ferry service across the Bay of Quinte at Glenora requires it, the usual Amherst Island ferries can be diverted to serve those higher priority routes. The MV Quinte Loyalist has filled in on some occasions when the Frontenac was not available.

The M/V Frontenac II was built in 1962 by Chantier Maritime De St. Laurent Ltee. of St. Laurent Quebec. The original name of the vessel was Charlevoix before being registered as Frontenac II in 1993 after being purchased by the Ontario Ministry of Transportation. Her official number is 313948 and her port of registry is Kingston, Ontario.

In 2017, the Ontario provincial government ordered a new battery electric powered 68 metres (223 ft) ferry with a capacity of 300 people and 42 vehicles from Damen Group to operate the Amherst Island route. That ferry, the Amherst Islander II, is scheduled to begin operations in April 2022.
