= Wolfe Islander IV =

Canadian ferry

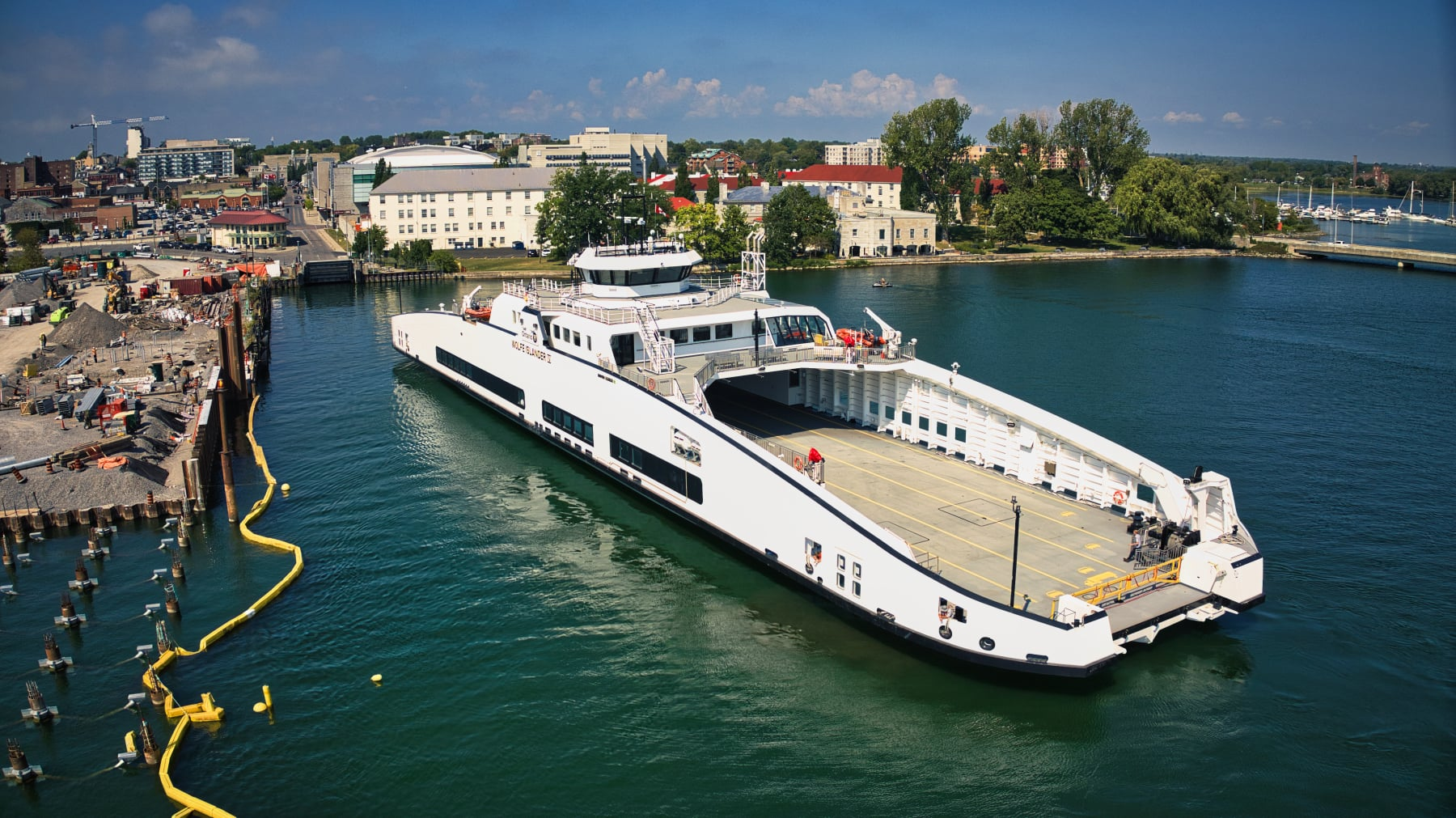

History
- Name: Wolfe Islander IV
- Owner: Ontario Ministry of Transportation
- Operator: Ontario Ministry of Transportation
- Route: Kingston to Wolfe Island
- Yard number: 539318
- Acquired: August 2021
- Status: Out of service for maintenance since 22 December 2025

General characteristics
- Type: Ferry
- Length: 98 m (321 ft 6 in)
- Beam: 19.8 m (65 ft 0 in)
- Draft: 2.7 m (9 ft)
- Installed power: Hybrid; Electric with diesel backup
- Speed: 12 knots (22 km/h; 14 mph)
- Capacity: 399 passengers; 75 cars

Wolfe Islander IV is a hybrid ferry serving between Kingston, Ontario and Wolfe Island in the Great Lakes. It replaced the ferry Wolfe Islander III and brings 50% more capacity. Wolfe Islander IV was constructed alongside another ferry, Amherst Islander II, using the same hybrid technology.

Wolfe Islander IV is a Damen 9819 E3 built at the Damen Galați shipyard in Romania. After being handed over to the Ontario Ministry of Transportation in August 2021, it was originally anticipated to be brought into full-time service in mid 2022, but faced several delays due in part to crew shortages and incomplete docking infrastructure. The ferry eventually began full-time service on August 17, 2024, however, as of September 2025 it has faced two major incidents that have taken it out of service for multiple months to do repairs.

== Specifications ==
The boat has a 2.7-metre (9 ft) draft, a 19.8-metre (65 ft 0 in) beam, a length of 98 metres (321 ft 6 in), and a top speed of 12 knots (22 km/h; 14 mph). The maximum passenger capacity of the ferry is 399, with space for up to 75 vehicles as well as an area for bicycles and pedestrians.

== Service history ==
The ferry began full-time service August 17, 2024, although construction on its dock is not expected to be completed until 2027. On December 4, the ferry drifted from its channel and ran aground resulting in damage to the hull and the ferry being taken out of service until May 20, 2025 for repairs, and improvement works being carried out to the navigation channel.

On July 19, 2025, the ferry suffered a mechanical issue with its diesel generator, which was being used to run the boat due to incomplete shore charging infrastructure. This generator issue led to the boat being taken out of service on August 2 until at least October 2025. It returned to service on October 11. On December 22, following inconsistent service throughout the weekend, the ferry suffered a "power issue", and once again went out of service. Temporary replacement service with a small boat, loaded with a bus and carrying only passengers (using the bus in place of a cabin) began in late afternoon of December 23, with no word on when Wolfe Islander IV will return to service.
