= Amherstview Public School =

Location
- 70 Fairfield Blvd; Amherstview, Ontario, K7N 1L4; Canada; 44.2229°N 76.6410°W

Information
- School type: Elementary and Middle school
- Motto: At Amherstview, we care
- School board: Limestone District School Board
- Principal: Mme Steel
- Grades: JK-8
- Language: English, French immersion
- Colours: Green and Gold
- Mascot: Alligator
- Team name: Gators
- Website: amherstviewps.limestone.on.ca

Amherstview Public School or AVPS is a Canadian public, comprehensive school located in Amherstview, Ontario, Canada. The school was founded in 1958, and currently serves about 600+ students from Loyalist Township and Stone Mills, Ontario. The town is in the eastern Ontario county of Lennox and Addington approximately 10 kilometers west of the city of Kingston, Ontario. The school offers classes for students in grades JK through grade 8 and is a member school of the Limestone District School Board. The school offers French immersion for students JK-grade 6.

== Extracurricular activities ==
Activities outside of curricular activities and groups at the school include, Briargate, DPA leaders, Environmentalism Club, Fitness and Dance club, Guitar club, Jewellery club, Library club, Office Helpers, Santa Claus Parade club, Sport stacking club, and Student council.

Additionally the school serves many Amerhestview sports teams, such as the Gators. The school also offers sports teams for; Basketball, Cross Country, Soccer, Track and field, and Volleyball. Sports offered at the intramural level^{clarification needed} include active games, border ball, parachute club, Quoits, soccer, three pitch and ultimate.
