= Mabel Van Camp =

Canadian judge

Mabel Margaret Van Camp (1920 – April 19, 2012) was a Canadian judge who in 1971 became the first woman on the Supreme Court of Ontario.

== Early life ==
Van Camp was born in 1920 in the farming village of Blackstock, Ontario, to William John Weir and Mary Jane (Smith) Van Camp. Mabel Van Camp grew up in this town alongside her three other sisters with whom she spent a lot of time. She finished high school in her hometown at age 16, and then became the first person from Blackstock to attend university. Mabel Van Camp attended Victoria University, and proceeded to attend Osgoode Hall for legal studies. Despite the dean of Osgoode Hall Law School telling her that life in the legal profession would be too difficult for a woman, she attended the university and graduated cum laude in 1947. That same year she passed her bar exam.

== Career ==
She practiced law, and became a partner, at the Toronto firm of Beaudoin, Pepper & Van Camp, which had previously been all-male. In fact, from an early point in her career, Van Camp's general practice was highly connected to that of Gerard Beaudoin. In 1971, Prime Minister Pierre Trudeau appointed her to the Ontario Supreme Court, giving her the distinction of being the first woman on that court. She was the president of the Women's Law Association of Ontario, a chancellor dean of the Alpha Mu chapter of the Kappa Beta Pi legal sorority, and on the board of directors of the YWCA. Furthermore, she was a member of the Council of the Canadian Bar Association and of the Canadian Institute of International Affairs. Mabel Van Camp was also a regent of the Imperial Order Daughters of the Empire (IODE) in the Fudger House chapter. She retired in 1995, having reached the mandatory retirement age of 75 and was honoured with an appointment to the Order of Ontario in 2003.

== Personal life ==
She had no children of her own, but was generous in supporting the education of all 15 of her nieces, nephews, great-nieces and great-nephews. She also enjoyed reading and skiing (which she did around her home). Frequently, Ms. Van Camp read fairy tales and children's stories to her nieces and nephews, and enjoyed buying them toys. Mabel Van Camp also visited her mother on the weekends in her hometown of Blackstock. She died on April 19, 2012, in Amherstview, Ontario, at the age of 91.
