= CJAI-FM =

Community radio station in Stella, Ontario

Coordinates: 44.170179°N 76.702856°W

- Stella, Ontario; Canada
- Broadcast area: Loyalist Township, Kingston, Greater Napanee
- Frequency: 101.3 MHz
- Branding: Amherst Island Public Radio

Programming
- Format: Community radio

Ownership
- Owner: Amherst Island Radio Broadcasting Inc.

History
- First air date: April 1, 2006
- Former frequencies: 93.7 MHz (2006–2007); 92.1 MHz (2007–2021)
- Call sign meaning: Amherst Island

Technical information
- Class: A1
- ERP: 3,050 watts average 4800 watts peak horizontal polarization only
- HAAT: 43 metres (141 ft)

Links
- Website: cjai.ca

CJAI-FM, known on air as Amherst Island Radio, is a radio station in Stella, Ontario, Canada. Broadcasting at 101.3 FM, the station airs a community radio format serving the Loyalist Township, Kingston and Greater Napanee regions. It's one of the few remaining independent radio stations in Canada.

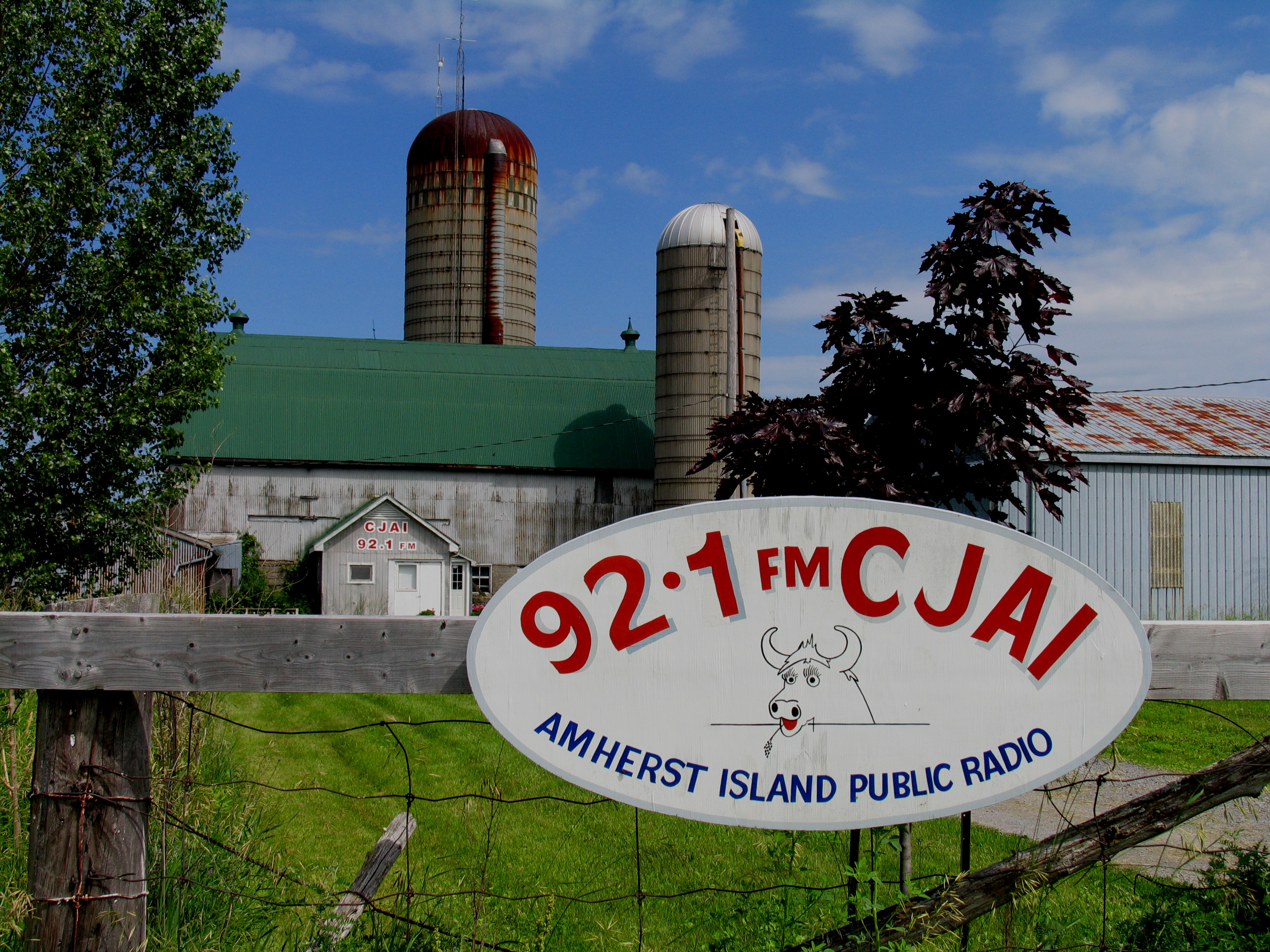
The barn that houses the CJAI 101.3 FM radio station in Stella, Ontario.

== History ==
The station launched on April 1, 2006, originally on 93.7 FM with a power of 5 watts. Previously licensed as a developmental community radio station, Amherst Island Radio changed frequency to 92.1 FM in October 2007 following the licensing of a new radio station on the adjacent 93.5 frequency in Kingston, and was granted a permanent license on December 6, 2007. It operated as a 250-watt class B community broadcast undertaking for the ensuing 14 year period.

CJAI-FM 92.1 Amherst Island Radio's former logo from 2007 - 2021

On August 4, 2020, Amherst Island Broadcasting Inc. submitted an application to change CJAI-FM's frequency from 92.1 MHz to 101.3 MHz with an associated power increase. On April 8, 2021, Amherst Island Radio Broadcasting Inc. received CRTC approval to change CJAI-FM's frequency from 92.1 MHz to 101.3 MHz, increasing the maximum effective radiated power (ERP) from 250 to 4,800 watts, increasing the average ERP from 166 to 3,050 watts, increasing the effective height of the antenna above average terrain from 18 to 43.4 metres.

The station moved its current 101.3 FM frequency, with increased power, and new transmitter site in Stella, ON, on October 26, 2021.

== Operations ==
The station is volunteer-run and non-profit, and is the only Canadian broadcast station with a primary studio location inside a barn (since inception). Operating from the barn's 14 ft x 19 ft milkhouse, it maintains two FM broadcasting booths. In late 2024, it opened a second studio location in the neighbouring village on Bath, ON. This second location (dubbed the "Media Hub") focuses on enhanced media production, such as live-off-the-floor recording of musical performances and podcast production, as well as FM broadcasting.

Personalities associated with the station have included former television anchor Peter Trueman, as well as community members, including Terry Culbert, Adam Miller, Judy Chui, Brian Little, Shell Madden, Leah Murray, Ellis & Mary Lou Wolfreys, Ross Haines, Doug Green, Jack Smith, Dayle Gowan, Susan Filson, Janet Scott, Peter Large, Ula Stief, Leah Murray, Ian Murray, Sally Bowen, Rosemary Richmond, Jim Gould, Don Ross, Michael Rowan, Fae MacArthur, Steve Kennedy, Keith Miller, Cheryl Saunders, Cathy Christmas, Eric Tremblay, Devin Stewart, Nic Rossetti, Larry Jensen, Shannon Myra, Derek Wagar, Dan Simpson, Jef Leeson, Judy Bierma, Anthony Gifford, Duane Hudson, Colin Kennedy, Kevin Offord, Shannon Myra, Kaela Simpson, Josh Bolton, Dave Wreggitt, Michael George, Sue Dodds, Chris Gaines, David Knowles, Sue Jennett, Nancy Cervenko, Bill McKee, Scott Jackson, Bon Evans, Mike Cox, Jai Sadler, Ang Fohry, Jeff Chestnut, Lorna Willis, Lynn Wyminga, Jon Nye, Darlene Martin-Stuart, Michael Peters, Carrick McAllister, Paul Peterson, Curt Sproule, Paul Proderick, Jan Murphy and Sam Hudson.

Funding of the station comes through donations, memberships, advertising partnerships, and fundraising events.

Musical content on Amherst Island Radio is approximately 55 per cent Canadian content on average and spans numerous genres: bluegrass, country, folk, rock, alternative rock, indie rock, pop, blues, jazz, classical, etc. Volunteers produce spoken word programming and several times per week local bands and special guests entertain listeners with in-studio performances/appearances. The diversity of programming is a reflection of the listeners in the station's broadcasting area.

Amherst Island Radio is a member of the National Campus and Community Radio Association.
