= Ernestown Intermediate and Secondary School =

Location
- 50 Main Street, Odessa, Ontario; Odessa, Ontario; Canada; 44.27702°N 76.72668°W

Information
- School type: Secondary School Intermediate School High School
- Motto: Amor Doctrinae Floreat
- School board: Limestone District School Board
- Enrollment: 500
- Language: English
- Colours: Green , White , Black & Yellow
- Mascot: Eagle
- Affiliations: KASSAA, EOSSAA, OFSAA
- Sports teams: Ernestown Eagles
- Website: http://ernestownss.limestone.on.ca/

Ernestown Intermediate and Secondary School or EISS or ESS is a Canadian public, comprehensive school located in Odessa, Ontario, Canada. The school services about 450 students from Loyalist Township, Napanee and Stone Mills, Ontario. The town is in the eastern Ontario county of Lennox and Addington approximately 24 kilometers west of the city of Kingston, Ontario. The school offers classes for students in grades seven through twelve and is a member school of the Limestone District School Board. The school motto at EISS is Amor Doctrinae Floreat - "Let the Love of Learning Flourish"

== History ==
The Odessa Continuation School that had serviced the community of Odessa for more than 40 years, closed in 1947. Ernestown Township then joined the Napanee and District High School area and with this change, area students were required to bus to the school in Napanee.

In 1958, Reeve Erwell Huff, petitioned to allow Ernestown to withdraw from the school area of Napanee, which town council overwhelmingly endorsed. In September 1959, the first students were housed temporarily at the Township Hall and in a new cement block building erected in the town of Odessa. The student population was little more than 200 students. Ground breaking at the current site took place in 1959 and in 1960 Ernestown Township High School opened its doors at the present location. An addition to the school was made in 1965 with subsequent additions in 1969 and 1983.

In 2024, Ernestown Secondary School became an Intermediate school, housing grades 7 to 12. Changing the schools name to Ernestown Intermediate and Secondary School.

== Sports ==
The Ernestown Eagles compete in the Kingston Area Secondary Schools Athletics Association (KASSAA) with thirteen other area schools. Team colours are forest green and black. The Eagles compete in Badminton, Basketball, Cross-Country, Football, Ice Hockey, Soccer, Track and Field, Volleyball, Rugby and Wrestling. Until recently, the school also housed a rowing program that trained on Mud Lake, however the program was discontinued after the rowing coach left the school.

== Notable alumni and former students ==
In 2024, a ESS Alumni Wall Unveiling Ceremony, a project by Ernestown’s Parent Council, took place. The event honoured many notable alumni including, but not limited to: Adnan Virk, Konner Burtenshaw, Richard Calvert Revelle, Wendy Bouwma, Grace Flint Vanderzande, Aaron Doornekamp, Martina Fitzgerald, The MacKinnon Brothers, The Glorious Sons, and Gord Downie.

- Aaron Doornekamp, Canadian Interuniversity Sport (CIS) Player of the Year, National team member and CIS first team All-Canadian. Led the Carleton Ravens to four national CIS men's basketball championships.
- Gordon Downie, rock musician and writer, Downie was the lead singer and lyricist of The Tragically Hip. Downie attended ESS from 1978-1980 (grades 9 & 10).
- Adnan Virk, Sports anchor and reporter, 2024 Emmy winner for Outstanding Studio Show Daily, MLB Tonight.
- Brett Emmons, rock musician, writer and singer of The Glorious Sons. Emmons attended ESS from 2006-2010

== See also ==
- Education in Ontario
- List of secondary schools in Ontario
