= Loyalist, Ontario =

Township in Ontario, Canada

Loyalist
- Township (lower-tier)
- Township of Loyalist
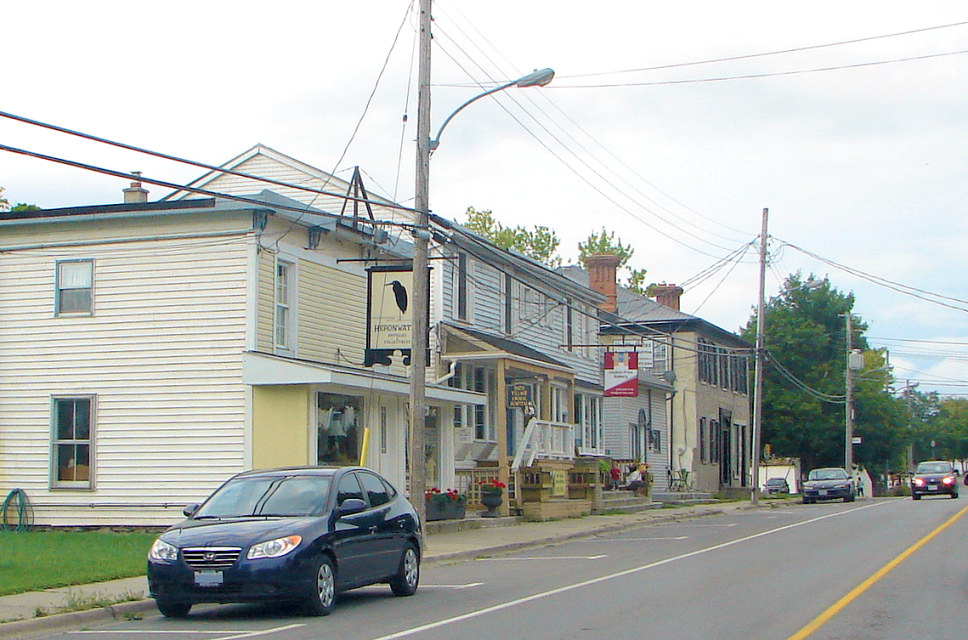
- Main street in Bath

- Flag
- Motto: "A Loyal Three Made Stronger In One"
- Location within Southern Ontario
- Coordinates: 44°14′37″N 76°46′09″W
- Country: Canada
- Province: Ontario
- County: Lennox and Addington
- Formed: January 1, 1998

Government
  - Type: Township
  - Mayor: Jim Hegadorn
  - Federal riding: Hastings—Lennox and Addington—Tyendinaga
  - Prov. riding: Hastings—Lennox and Addington

Area
  - Land: 342.72 km^{2} (132.32 sq mi)

Population (2021)
  - Total: 17,943
  - Estimate (2025): ▲20,041
  - Density: 52.4/km^{2} (136/sq mi)
- Time zone: UTC-05:00 (EST)
  - Summer (DST): UTC-04:00 (EDT)
- Postal Code: K0H
- Area codes: 613, 343
- Website: www.loyalist.ca

Loyalist is a lower-tier township in Eastern Ontario, Canada on Lake Ontario. It is in Lennox and Addington County and consists of two total parts: the mainland and Amherst Island. It was named after the historic United Empire Loyalists, who initially settled in the area following the American Revolution.

Loyalist Township was formed on January 1, 1998, through the amalgamation of Amherst Island Township, Ernestown Township, and Bath Village.

== Communities ==
The primary centres of settlement in Loyalist are Amherstview, Bath and Odessa. Smaller communities include Asselstine, Bayview, Emerald, Ernestown, Links Mills, McIntyre, Millhaven, Morven, Nicholsons Point, Stella, Storms Corners, Switzerville, Thorpe, Violet and Wilton. Since Loyalist Township is the only municipal level of government in the area, the boundaries of most mainland settlements are unofficial and matters of tradition.

=== Amherstview ===
Amherstview is named for Amherst Island, located directly to the south in Lake Ontario. When the community was first established in the 1950s, the spelling was generally "Amherst View". The community is the eastern end of the Loyalist Parkway, a stretch of Highway 33 that travels along Lake Ontario, in an area in which many United Empire Loyalists settled. As of 2021, Amherstview has a population of about 6500.

Amherstview is home to Fairfield House which is situated in Fairfield Park on the shore of Lake Ontario. Fairfield House was constructed in 1793 by the Fairfield family who were among the first Loyalists to settle the area. It served as the family home and a portion of the building was also used as a tavern for some time. The wood and limestone building is now a museum exhibiting period artifacts and furniture and offering guided tours.

Fairfield Park itself stretches along more than 600 m of Lake Ontario shoreline. The park is a popular picnicking area and is also well used by swimmers and scuba divers. Limestone shelf rock formations leading into the water simplify the launching and landing of kayaks and canoes although suitable facilities for larger watercraft do not exist. The park is home to many species of trees including red oak, poplar, willow, shagbark hickory, ash, maple, cedar, linden, and spruce. Extensive banks of lilac provide flowers and fragrance in season and many of the larger trees in the park are fitted with strings of lights for display at Christmas.

Amherstview is also home to the Henderson Recreation Centre. The centre houses a public library, a 25 m public swimming pool, and an arena and also includes an outdoor soccer field. The arena is the home rink for the Amherstview Jets hockey team.

=== Bath ===
Flag of Bath, adopted in 1997

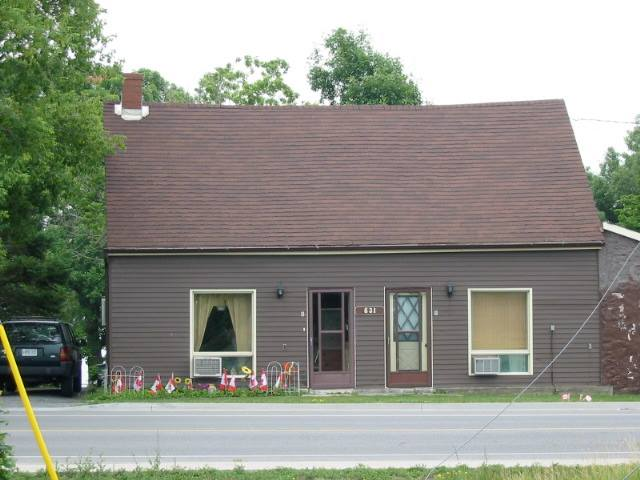
Hawley House, oldest house in Ontario, c. 1785

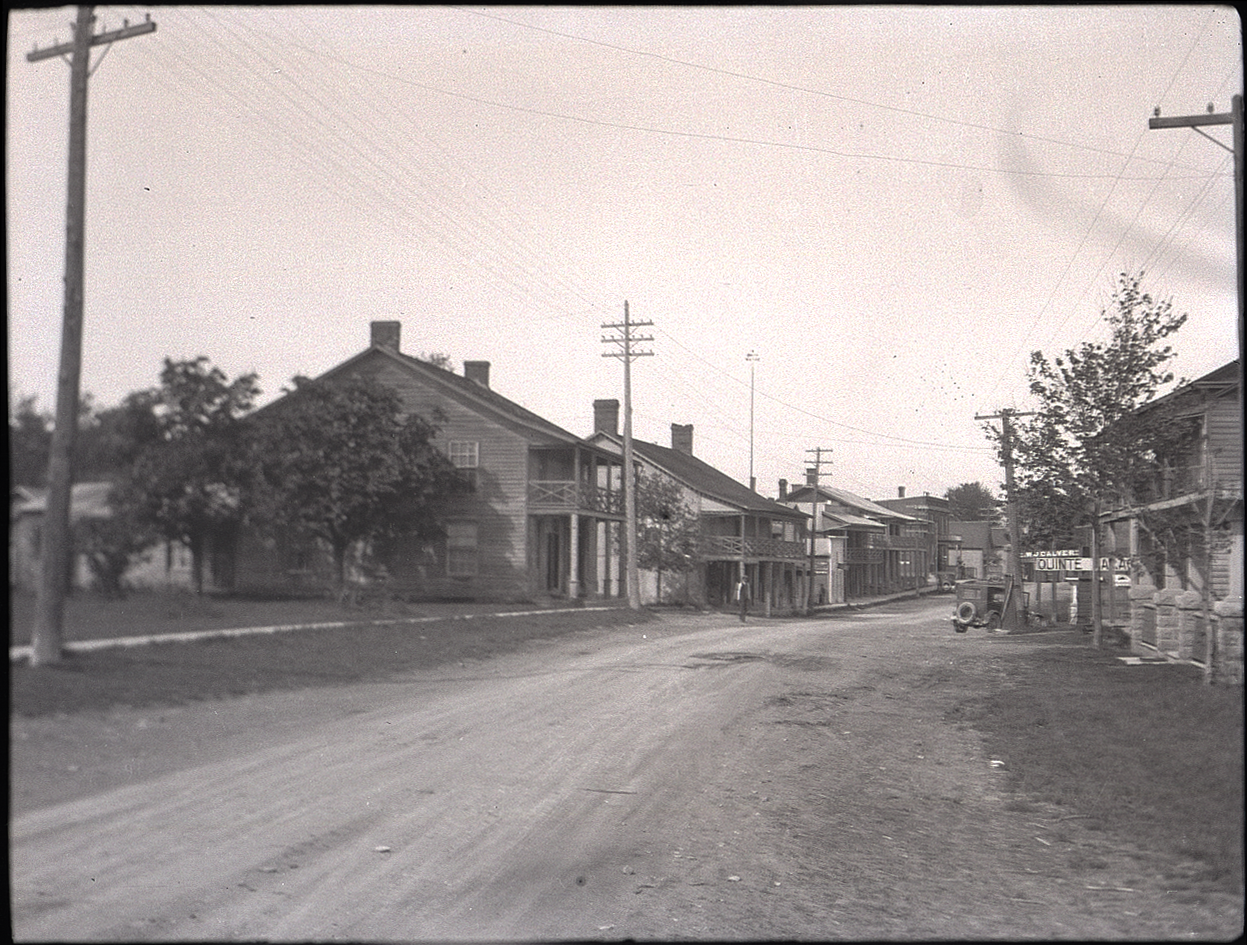
Bath street scene, 1926

Bath was first settled by the United Empire Loyalists in 1784, making it one of the oldest communities in Ontario. It was served by an early colonial road, the 1784 Bath Road, which follows the lakefront as the Loyalist Parkway. Discharged soldiers from Jessup's Rangers were the first settlers. The economic development of the community was enabled by a sheltered harbour and road connections with Kingston stimulated economic development. By mid-century Bath was a prosperous point of trade. After the town had been divided up between the families of Hawley, Davy, Rose and Amey, it was John Davy who was first to lay down roads on his lot #10. By 1804 the whole village had been prepared for settlement and surveyed. The village was originally named Ernestown, but was renamed Bath in 1819 after the city in England.

A bustling lakefront manufacturing village with 400-1000 people in the 1850s, Bath began to lose industrial importance to Napanee (and to cities like Kingston/Belleville) after being successively bypassed by the York Road (1817), the Grand Trunk Railway (1856) and the 401 motorway (1964). The closest rail access was an 1856 Ernestown rail station built to the west of Camden East Road in a rural area, similar in design to Napanee's historic station; it is now boarded up and inaccessible.

The town of Bath as of 2016 has a population of 2,154. This is an increase of 10.1% from 2011 when they had a population of 1,957.

=== Odessa ===
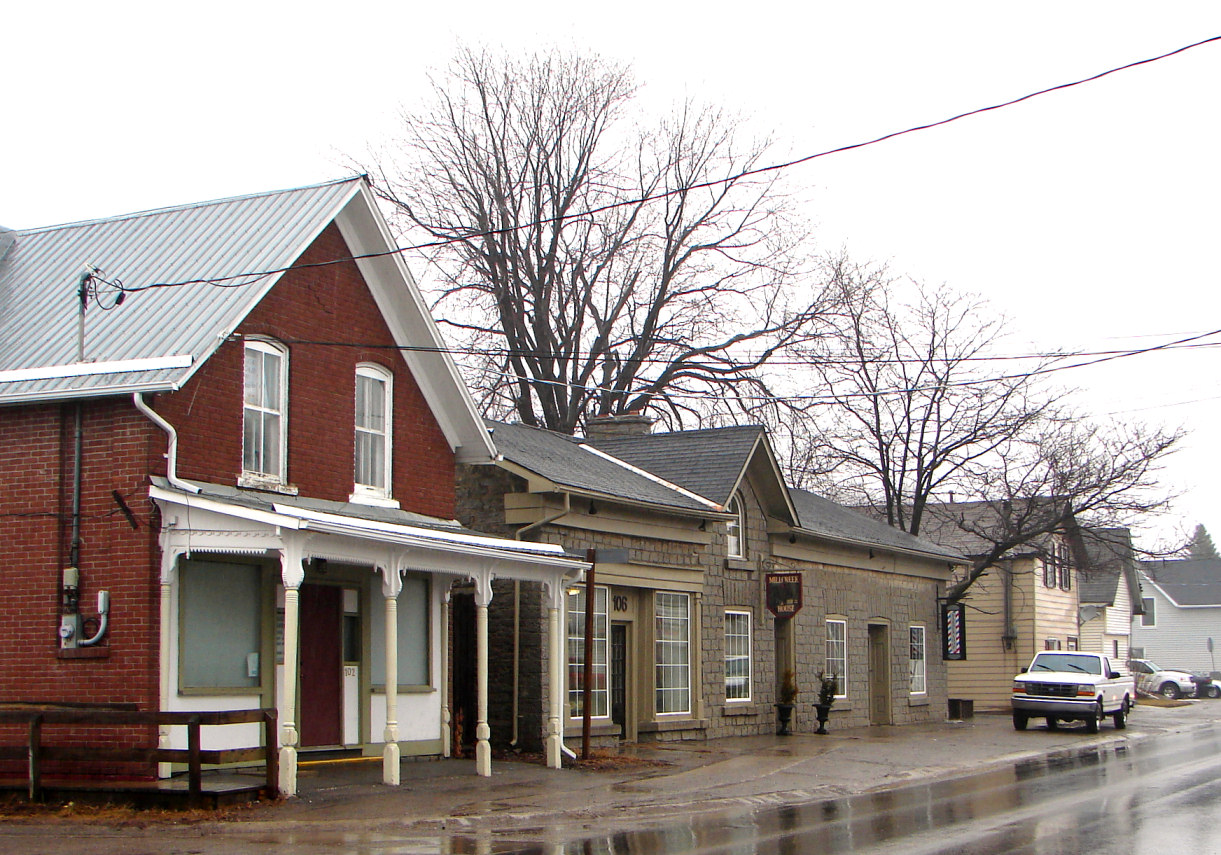
Odessa

Odessa is a village located between Napanee and Kingston. It was originally named Millcreek, and was renamed in 1855 by its postmaster to commemorate the 1854 British siege of the Black Sea port at Odesa in Ukraine during the Crimean War. The village is home to Ernestown Secondary School, which services about 650 students from Loyalist Township (formerly Ernestown Township), Napanee and Stone Mills. The township offices and a fire hall are on Odessa's Main Street. There is a small fairground. An Ontario Provincial Police detachment serves Ontario Highway 401 and is home to the Tactics and Rescue Unit Eastern Region.

The water supply of the community of Odessa within the Township of Ernestown was studied in 1972, which led to the planning of infrastructure improvements. The highest point in the village is the water tower. Visible for several kilometres in all directions, the water tower has been outfitted as a wireless communications facility. The village bills itself as "home of the Babcock Mill," which historically was powered by Millhaven Creek which runs through the heart of Odessa, and comes out of Odessa Lake. In the 2020s Odessa has experienced increased residential development which will ultimately see it approximately double in population.

=== Amherst Island ===
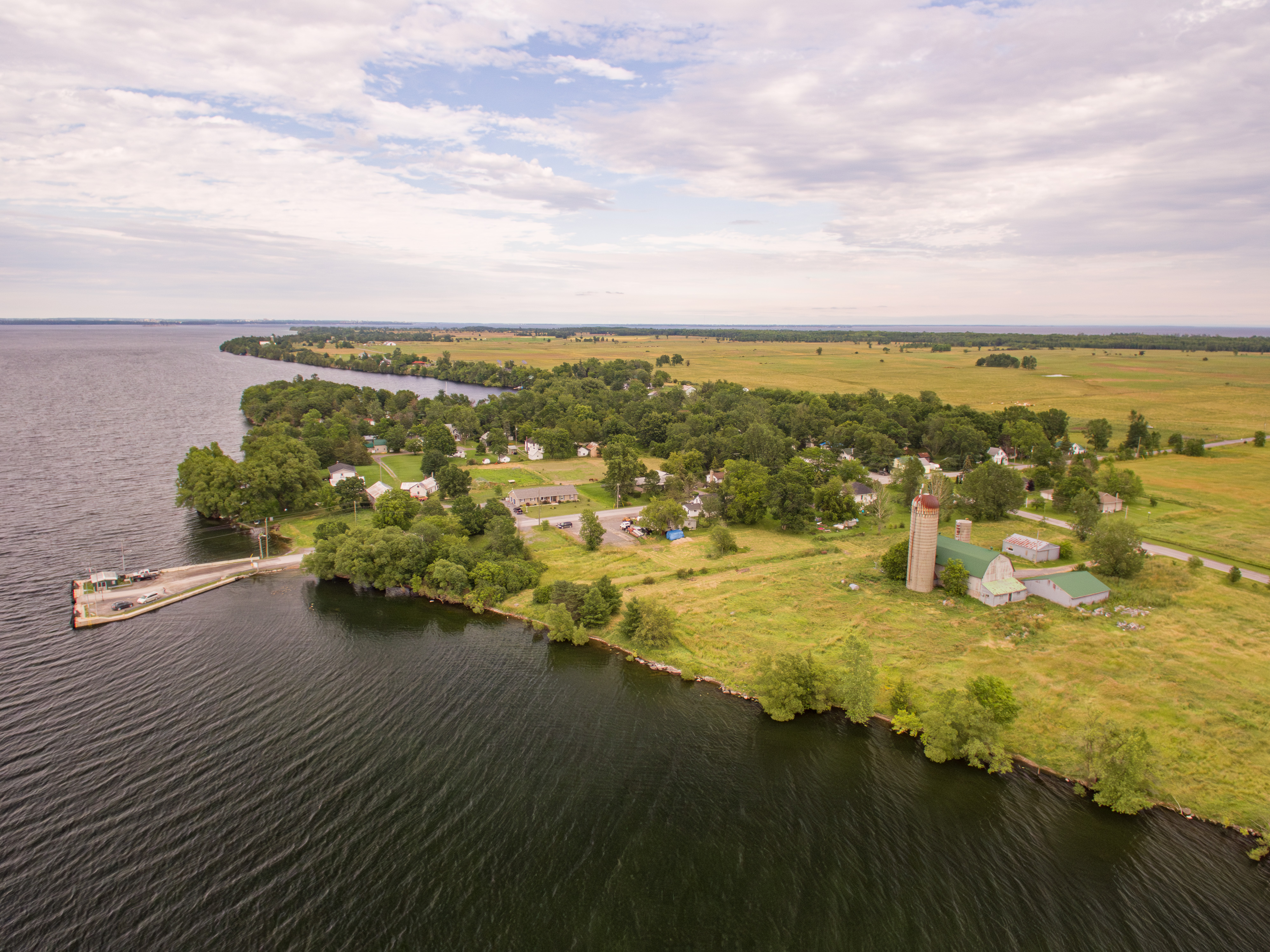
Amherst Island, Stella Village

Stella and Emerald are located on Amherst Island. Stella is the downtown, where the ferry docks are, and lends its name as the surviving Canada Post Office for Amherst Island. Emerald is a collection of half a dozen houses and a church towards the west end of the Island. Amherst Island is located about 3 kilometres (1.9 mi) offshore from mainland Loyalist Township, and is serviced by a people, cyclist, automobile and truck ferry from Millhaven. Amherst Island was farmed for generations by Irish tenants who leased from an Irish Lord through his manager, and many Islanders are descendants of those late settlers. Today the agricultural canvas has become an art colony, retirement/ cottage country, with active service groups, a radio station, Amherst Island Radio CJAI 101.3 FM, and the LCBO convenience store, that all add to the Island's frisson.

== Demographics ==
In the 2021 Census of Population conducted by Statistics Canada, Loyalist had a population of 17,943 living in 6,830 of its 7,145 total private dwellings, a change of 5.7% from its 2016 population of 16,971. With a land area of 342.72 km^{2} (132.32 sq mi), it had a population density of 52.4/km^{2} (135.6/sq mi) in 2021.

Canada census – Loyalist community profile

	2021	2016	2011
Population	17,943 (+5.7% from 2016)	16,971 (+4.6% from 2011)	16,221 (+7.7% from 2006)
Land area	342.72 km^{2} (132.32 sq mi)	341.02 km^{2} (131.67 sq mi)	341.04 km^{2} (131.68 sq mi)
Population density	52.4/km^{2} (136/sq mi)	49.8/km^{2} (129/sq mi)	47.6/km^{2} (123/sq mi)
Median age	45.2 (M: 44.0, F: 46.4)	45.0 (M: 44.0, F: 46.1)	43.6 (M: 42.4, F: 45.0)
Private dwellings	7,145 (total) 6,830 (occupied)	6,710 (total)	6,174 (total)
Median household income	$95,000	$80,691	$69,324

References: 2021 2016 2011

Historical census populations – Loyalist, Ontario
Year	Pop.	±%
1996	14,551	—
2001	14,590	+0.3%
2006	15,062	+3.2%
2011	16,221	+7.7%
2016	16,971	+4.6%
2021	17,943	+5.7%
Source: Statistics Canada

Mother tongue (2021):

- English as first language: 92.1%
- French as first language: 2.8%
- English and French as first language: 0.6%
- Other as first language: 3.9%

== Economy ==
There is a Bombardier Transportation engineering and manufacturing facility located in Millhaven. The 480-acre (190 ha) site was originally opened by the now-defunct Urban Transportation Development Corporation around 1978.

In 2010, Bombardier received a $1.5 million grant from the province's Eastern Ontario Development Fund to invest in the facility. By 2011, there were 250 full-time employees. Throughout the late 2010s, the facility was used for vehicle manufacturing, testing, and retrofitting work on various Canadian light rail and metro rail projects, including Toronto's Eglinton Crosstown, Waterloo Region's Ion light rail, Edmonton's Valley Line, and part of a large order of Toronto streetcars, tested on a specially constructed TTC gauge track.

== Culture ==
The Tragically Hip have a recording studio located in Bath called The Bathouse Recording Studio. The band's lead singer, Gordon Downie, was born and raised in Amherstview and attended Amherstview Public School (AVPS).

A 100% volunteer-run community radio station, Amherst Island Radio CJAI 101.3 FM, broadcasts from Stella. The township is also served by media from Kingston.

The Township hosts a Winter Carnival each year toward the end of January. A popular event associated with the Carnival is the Christmas Tree Bonfire. In the weeks after Christmas, residents pile their dead Christmas trees at the Odessa Fair Grounds. On an evening during the Carnival, the trees are set blaze as the centrepiece to a night of skating, outdoor games, and the roasting of hotdogs and marshmallows.

== Transportation ==
The township is served by provincial Highway 401 Highway 2, and Highway 33.

Public transportation between Amherstview and Kingston is provided by Kingston Transit.

Public transportation between Odessa and Kingston is provided by Loyalist Link, a service provided by the Loyalist Township under contract with Stock Transportation. This service launched on November 4th, 2024, and will continue to run until December 31st, 2025.

A toll ferry, the Frontenac II, operates between Millhaven (on the Ontario mainland) and Stella (on Amherst Island). As of January, 2021, the toll is $10 for a return trip ticket on a standard car or light truck. There is a nominal charge for bicycles and motorcycles while walk-on passengers are free.

== Education ==
Primary and secondary education is provided at a number of schools operated by either the Limestone District School Board or the Algonquin and Lakeshore Catholic District School Board, including Amherstview Public School (K-8) and Ernestown Intermediate and Secondary School (7-12). The nearest post-secondary education (community college and university) is in the adjacent city of Kingston. One of the first schools in Upper Canada was opened in the village of Bath in 1811.

== Notable residents ==
- Emily Julian McManus (1865–1918), poet, author, and educator
- William Metzler (1863–1943), mathematician
- Gord Downie (1964–2017), musician

== See also ==
- List of townships in Ontario
