= Amherst Island =

Island in Ontario, Canada

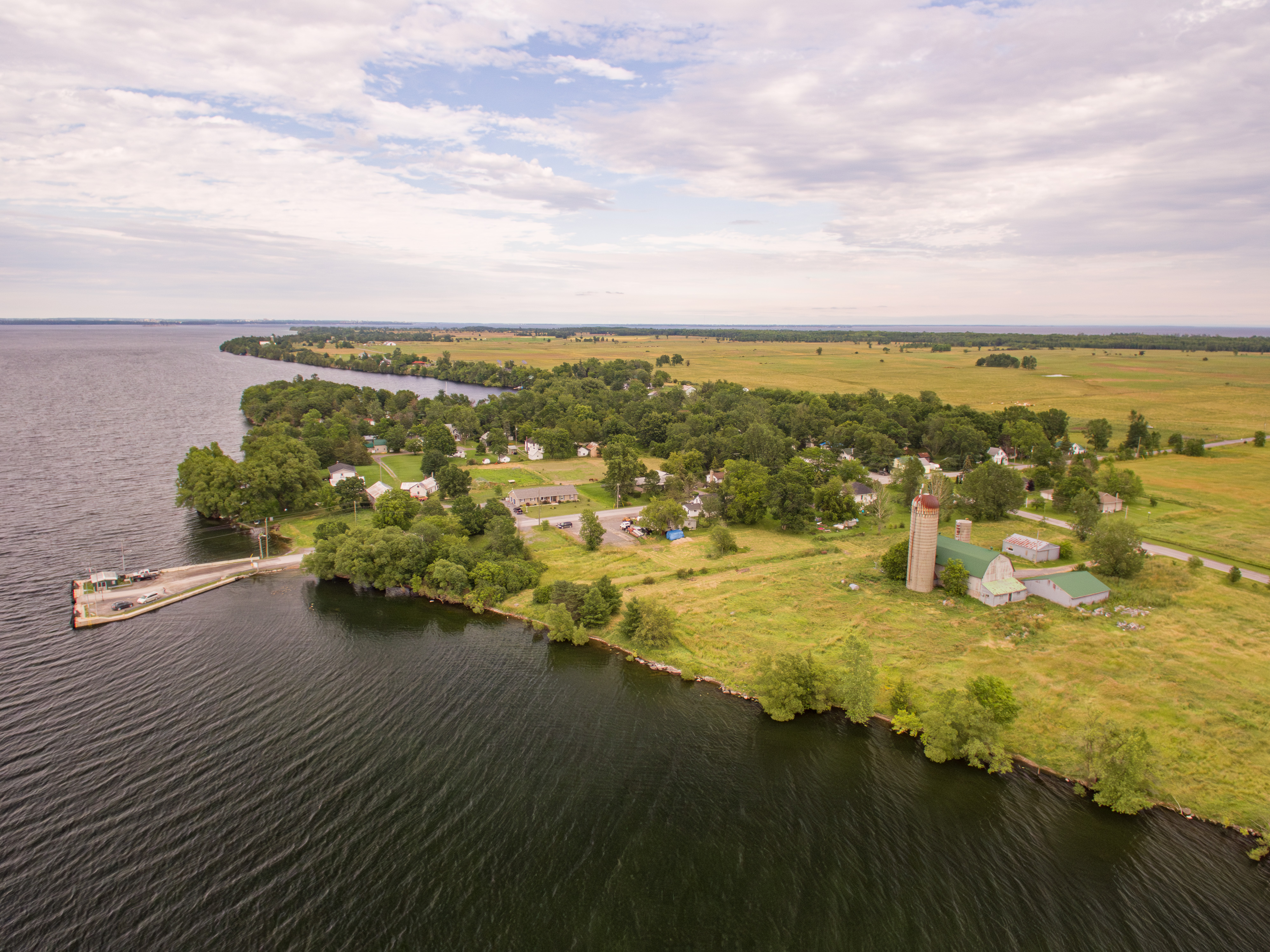

- Location within Southern Ontario

Geography
- Location: Lake Ontario
- Coordinates: 44°09′00″N 76°43′12″W
- Area: 70 km^{2} (27 sq mi)
- Length: 20 km (12 mi)
- Width: 7 km (4.3 mi)

Administration
- Canada
- Province: Ontario
- County: Lennox and Addington
- Township: Loyalist township

Demographics
- Population: 450
- Pop. density: 6.43/km^{2} (16.65/sq mi)

Amherst Island is located in Lake Ontario, 10 kilometres (6 mi) west of Kingston, Ontario, Canada. Amherst Island, being wholly in Lake Ontario, is upstream, above the St Lawrence River Thousand Islands. The island is part of Loyalist Township in Lennox and Addington County. Amherst Island is located about 3 kilometres (2 mi) offshore from the rest of Loyalist Township and is serviced by public ferry from Millhaven. The Island measures over 20 kilometres (12 mi) in length from Bluff Point in the southwest to Amherst Bar in the northeast and over 7 kilometres (4.3 mi) at its widest point across. The island is about 66 square kilometres (25 mi^{2}) in size and is one of the largest islands in the Great Lakes.

The Amherst Island archipelago also includes: Nut Island, Grape Island pronounced Grapee, the Brother Islands and Salmon Island, totalling over 6,800 hectares (16,700 acres) or about 66 square kilometres (25 mi^{2}). Nut Island is the largest of these islands and is about 610 metres (2,000 ft) off the Amherst Island shore between Amherst Bay and Long Point Bay. Grape Island is located about 300 metres (1,000 ft) off the Amherst Island shore, and can be easily seen from shore. The Brother Islands are situated equidistant between Amherst Island, Amherstview and Lemoine Point, Kingston, Ontario.

== History ==
Amherst Island had been frequented, inhabited seasonally by Indigenous peoples who named it, Ka8enesgo translated as big, long island. Amherst Island was known by the French as Isle Tonti, after Henri de Tonty, Lieutenant to La Salle during their explorations. Loyalist-era settlement had started by 1792 and the Island was thickly settled by 1835. In a proclamation by the Lieutenant Governor of Upper Canada John Graves Simcoe on 16 July 1792, the Island was formally renamed to Amherst Island, in honour of Jeffery Amherst, 1st Baron Amherst, who was commander-in-chief of British forces in North America. Simcoe was renaming the archipelago to commemorate British Generals of the Seven Years' War: Wolfe Island, Amherst Island, and Howe Island.

In 1788, the island was granted by the Executive Council to one of their own Sir John Johnson, who had lost his father's extensive New York Colony possessions to the revolting colonies. In 1823, Sir John's widowed daughter, Catharine Maria Bowes, gained control of the island estate from her disinterested father. She sold numerous conversions of life-leases to freehold ownership to avoid the looming Wild Land Tax, 1824. By 1827 Mrs. Bowes was still in financial difficulty and granted a power of attorney to the Stephen Moore, 3rd Earl Mount Cashell, who purchased the balance of the Island Estate outright from her in 1835. Individual freeholders already owned and farmed nearly 4,000 acres, approximately one quarter of the Island, predominantly, but not restricted to, the First Concession.

Mount Cashell's interest in Amherst Island was both profit-oriented and initially humanitarian. He aspired to establish a feudal estate, and reap large returns on his investment by the settlement of the Island with industrious tenants who would continue to clear and cultivate the land, thereby improving its value and providing his heirs with a perpetual rental income. But his vision initially, extended beyond pecuniary ends. Inspired by the evangelical belief in human improvement, he thought that by encouraging emigration from Ireland to Canada he could help solve the overpopulation of his homeland, create a prosperous, loyal farming population in the new world, and strengthen the Empire through a transatlantic grain trade. Mount Cashell became a leading spokesman of these views in North America.

Most of the Irish settlers had been small farmers, labourers, sailors, artisans, and the better-off class of labourers from Ards Peninsula Ards, County Down (importantly property not owned by Mount Cashell). Since their homeland was particularly exposed to coastal winds and the absence of water-power, their built environment had been dotted with windmills.

Mount Cashell issued the settlers seven-year leases at a nominal rent and requiring them to make certain improvements each year. He erected two piers, to secure and make serviceable two excellent natural harbours; he introduced a clergyman for St James' Anglican Church, for whom he provided a glebe house; he sent out a surgeon, for whom also he built a house; he built a house for an active agent; he built and furnished an excellent general store and a forge. Families from the Ards had begun arriving by the 1820s. Throughout the 1830s and 1840s their numbers swelled as friends and relatives continued to arrive – chain migration. But by the 1860s the movement had subsided. Settlers who arrived in the early years moved straight into leases while those arriving after 1850 often laboured for friends before renting existing leases. By 1841, the community had three schools and a population of over 1,000 people. The majority of families were Presbyterian, followed by Roman Catholics, Church of England, and recent Methodist converts. These Irish immigrants lived in either shanties or one-storey log houses on their leased land, and never achieved purchasing farms from departing, pre-Mount Cashell freeholders.

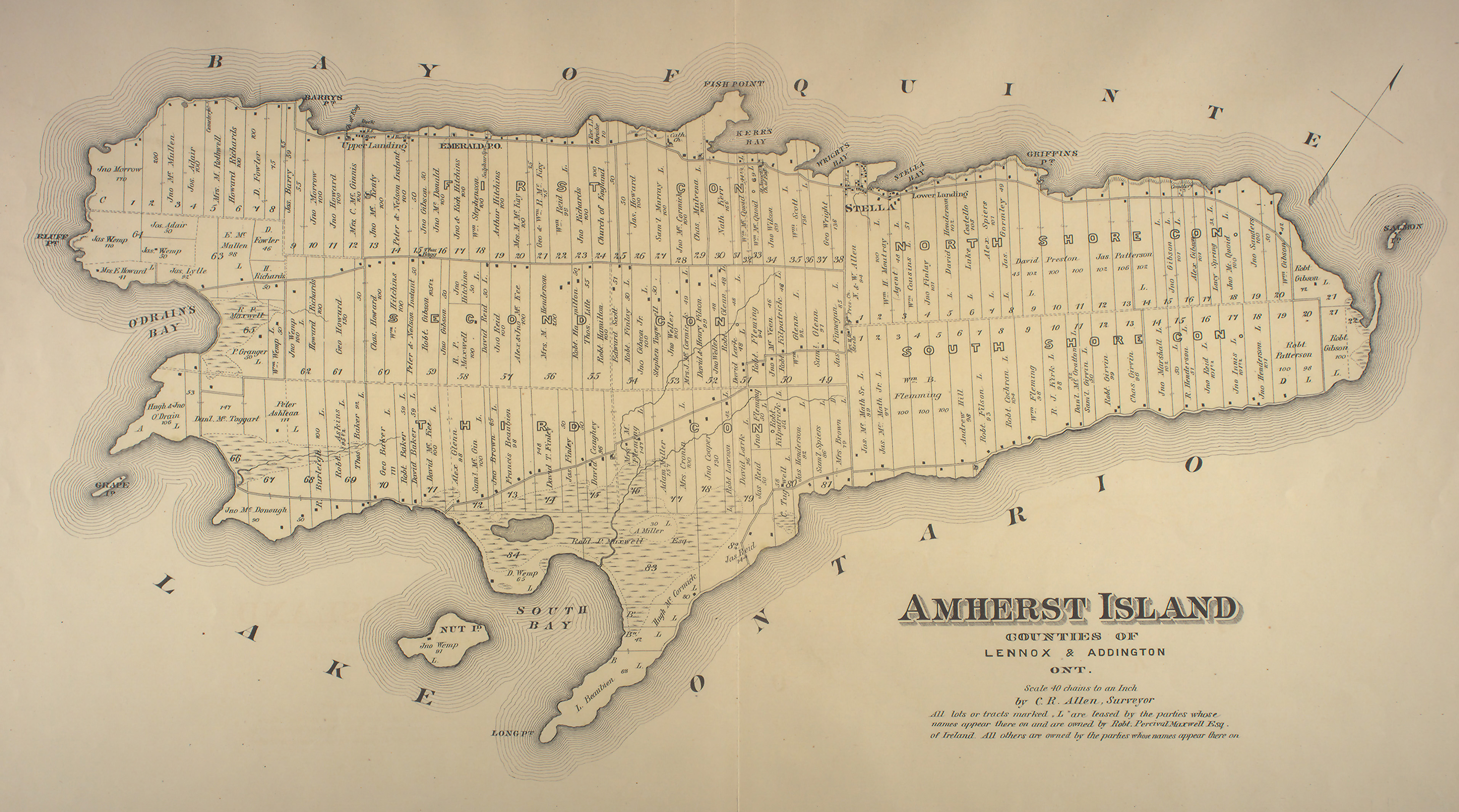
1878 map of Amherst Island

It is impossible to imagine the social dichotomy on the Island during Mount Cashell's management: individual freeholders, the minority, who could conduct long term, personal strategies versus the majority, tenants with no prospects of ever owning their farm, who could neither commit resources nor time to beyond next year. The freeholders owned wood cookstoves in their "improved houses," while the tenants cooked on open hearths in their temporary abodes.

While Amherst Islanders had prospered from the grain trade into the 1840s, the soil was depleted, the Hessian Fly agricultural pest had arrived and the Huron Tract beckoned; dozens of tenant families departed to the prospect of owning land on the distant frontier. Their landlord fell upon hard times. The famine in Ireland hurt Mount Cashell badly. Distressed Irish tenants and declining rents placed a heavy burden on a landlord who was already in debt because of lavish living and beleaguered by an untrustworthy agent's embezzlement. In 1848, he mortgaged Amherst Island. Several more mortgages followed on his Canadian properties, and in 1856 his creditors foreclosed and Amherst Island was sold at public auction to creditor/ kin Robert Perceval Maxwell (1813–1905). Some of the current residents of the Island are descendants of those Irish settlers.

Amherst Island at mid-19th century was a mixed economy of farming wheat and barley, fishing in the Bay of Quinte, sailing the Great Lakes, and shipbuilding at the local yard of David Tait. Soon, however, the shipyard relocated west to Prince Edward County; sailing declined as railways supplanted the previous monopoly of water transport; and crop farming gave way to more stable, mixed dairy farming. As the economy changed those who could not make the transition left, while those who remained imagined purchasing their lease-hold and expanding their farms.

In all this, Robert Perceval Maxwell and his agent were the primary financiers, establishing the agricultural society and a cheese factory, promoting improvements, and financing loans and mortgages. Throughout these years, the Ards emigrants did very well. Many became proprietors, they held prominent positions in the community, and the Island became well known for its 'Irishness'. John Watson, from Portaferry, called his pub on the Island the 'County Down Inn'. The stone fences that lined the land were modelled after those on the Ards.

1870s: The remaining tenants had the opportunity to buy their farms and transition out of their log residences, and build "improved houses." Thereby the island most likely slipped from carbon neutrality to importing Coal circa 1880: the resident agent's country manor house Farnham itself burned 20 tons per year.

== Amherst Island Virtual War Memorial ==
Boer War

Corporal Edward Allan Filson †

World War I

Lieutenant Bertram Kerr Allen †
Sapper James Henry Bell †
Private Charles Burgess †
Private James Ernest Arthur Dennee †
Private Frederick C Morris Glass †
Private Thomas Edward McFern †
Private Edward Alexander Milligan †
Private Hugh Sterling Polley †
Private William Ross Pringle †
Trooper Charles Reid †
Private Bernard George Twort †
Lance Corporal Lawrence Oswald K Wemp †
Private Frederick Willard †

World War II

Flying Officer John James Earls †
Corporal John Henry Kearney †
Warrant Officer Wallace David Kearney †
Flying Officer Anthony Brian Orchard †
Pilot Officer Cecil Ralph Tait †
Gunner Fred Ernest Wemp †

== Community ==
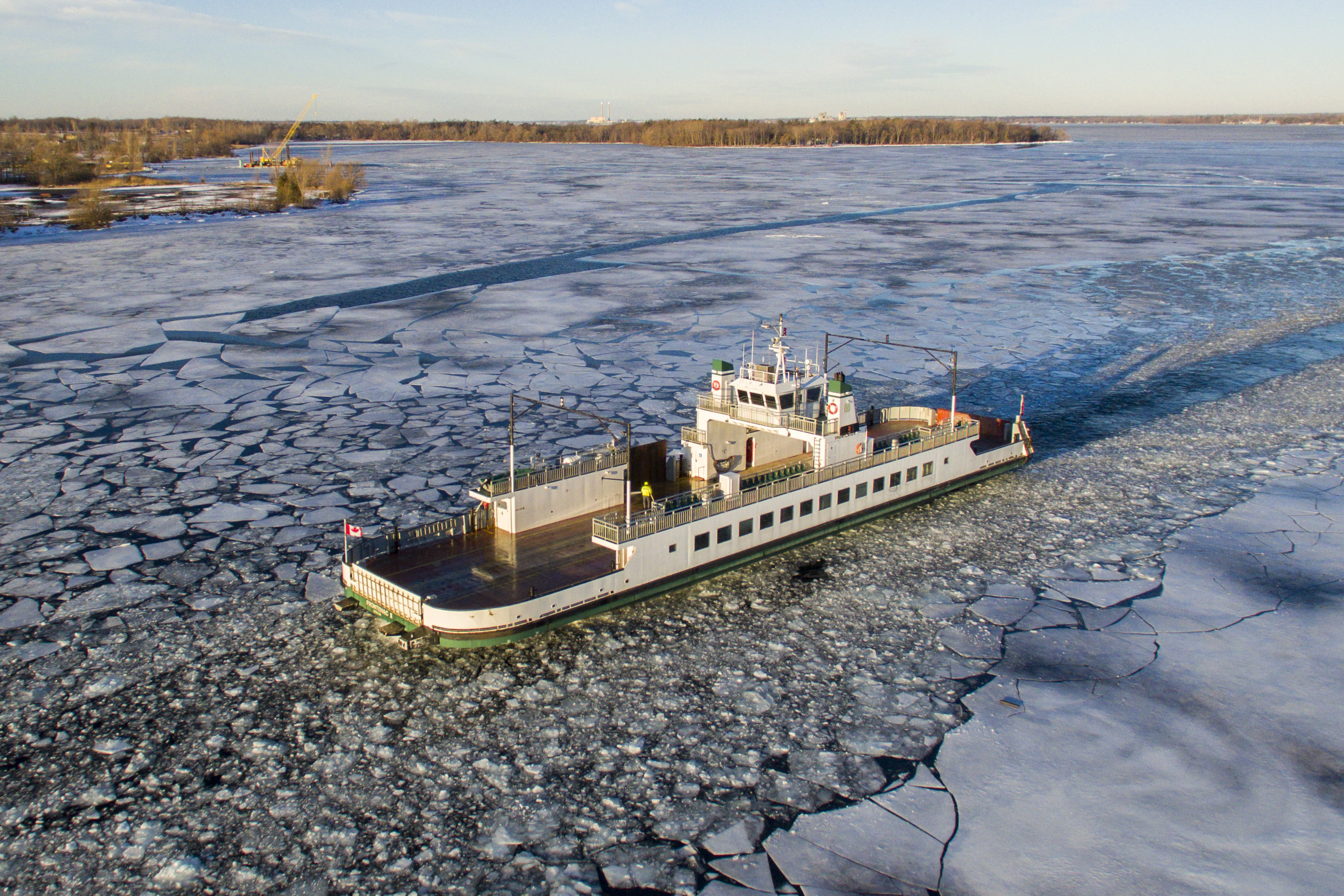
The Frontenac II, a passenger and vehicle ferry servicing Amherst Island on Lake Ontario in the community of Loyalist Township, Ontario.

The two neighbourhoods on Amherst Island Stella and Emerald still reveal the forgotten steam-boat landings. Stella, formerly Lower Landing is the metropolis, where the ferry docks, has McGinn's General Store, LCBO Convenience Outlet, the Back Kitchen, Neilson Store Museum, and Weasel & Easel. It borrows its name from the Stella Post Office, the remaining postal outlet for the Island. Emerald, formerly Upper Landing is a collection of a dozen houses and a church towards the west end of the Island.

The island is accessible from the mainland only by water or air. A toll ferry service, carrying people, cyclists and motorists, connects the hamlet of Stella on the Island with Millhaven on the mainland. The ferry, Frontenac II, runs 365 days a year, with a crossing time of about 20 minutes. There is a nominal charge for bicycles and motorcycles while pedestrians are free. The ferry service is operated by Loyalist Township.

The resident population of about 450 people doubles during the summer months. The Amherst Island Community Centre is available outside of regular school hours.

The Ministry of Transportation has awarded a $51.7 million contract for the conversion of the existing ferry docks from side-loading ramps to end-loading ramps to allow for easier access to and from the Island. Construction was completed in 2022, including improved vehicle queuing areas, public restrooms and heated waiting areas.

MTO has further announced plans to construct a new $20 million ferry for Amherst Island to replace the Frontenac II near the end of 2019 Amherst Islander II, anticipated Spring 2023].

== Amherst Island Radio 101.3 FM ==
A volunteer community radio station, Amherst Island Radio CJAI 101.3 FM, began broadcasting on April 1, 2006, originally on 93.7 FM. Previously licensed as a developmental community radio station, CJAI changed frequency to 92.1 FM in October 2007 following the licensing of a new radio station on the adjacent 93.5 frequency in Kingston, and was granted a permanent license on December 6, 2007. It is a 100% volunteer operated station, and is concerned with the preservation of harmony between the rural and urban way of life, accurate and timely information of local events, and the promotion of Canadian musical talent throughout Loyalist Township and beyond. In October 2021, CJAI expanded its broadcasting power and changed frequency to 101.3 FM.

== Notable islanders ==
Native islanders include Harry Raymond Fleming (1892–1942), Canadian MP for Humboldt, Saskatchewan, and English-born artist Daniel Fowler (1810–1894), who immigrated to Amherst Island in 1843 and remained there until his death. Fowler stated in his autobiography: "I found a sufficient variety of subjects on the island, along with shore and inland, and never went away on any sketching trip." Inspired by the Island's bucolic landscape, flora and fauna, Daniel Fowler was considered by his peers as "one of the fathers of Canadian Art". The house he lived in during his final years still exists on the north shore of the Island. A plaque commemorates the site.

Still standing on Amherst Island is family built and worked "W Brown and Son" Blacksmith Shop. First established by islander John Robinson in 1879, it was sold to John Brown in 1894. The original building burned down in 1913, but was soon rebuilt and run by Wes Brown, son of John Brown. It was operated until its closure in 1971.

== Ecology ==
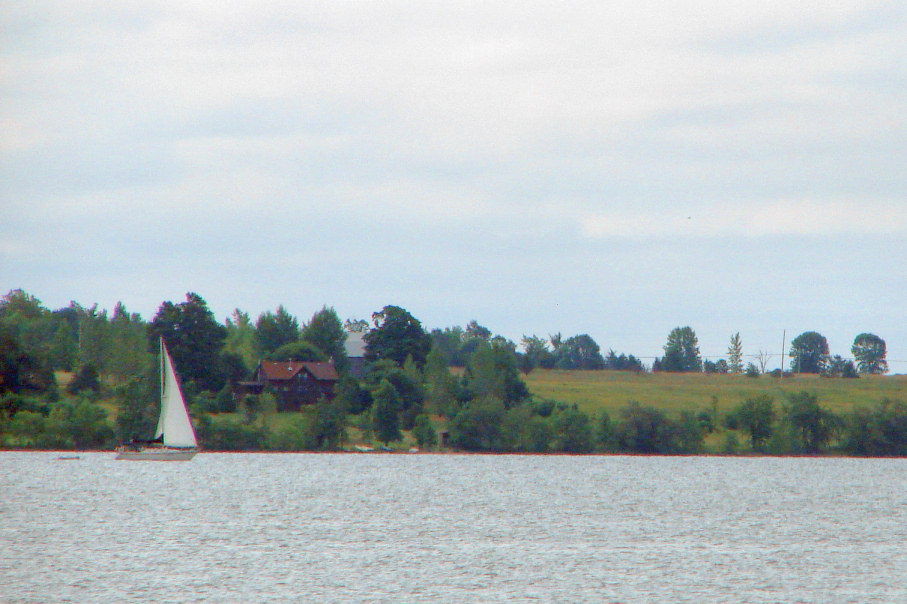
Amherst Island as seen from mainland

The natural habitat of the Island was as a mature forest. Presettlement, it was a closed-canopy, mixed deciduous forest: sugar maple, beech, basswood, with some oak particularly on stony sites, red ash on the wet sites, and black ash on the intermediate sites. The conifers were restricted to isolated stands of white pine or hemlock on well-drained sites, and presumably some white cedar. The Island forest also included hickories, American chestnut and black walnut. The trees would have formed a closed canopy, uneven-aged mature forest. The incidence of forest fires or insect devastation would have been extremely rare, certainly less than once per millennium. Indeed, the most significant perturbations would have been wind and/or ice storms. The forest canopy, particularly near the shore, would have been (and still is) shaped by the winds. There was an accumulated, rich organic component to the forest soil profile.

That forest is gone. Currently there is a steady-state condition of grassland. Centuries of agriculture has depleted the organic matter, the resulting heavy soil is characterized as white clay. The annual summer drought and winter wind-burn combine as a harsh environment for all small trees, even before our Climate Crisis. The recurring plagues of both meadow vole and white-tailed deer threaten the few young trees. emerald ash borer is about to destroy the significant Ash component. The Island is threatened to permanently lose vital nesting, perching, and shelter habitat.

Amherst Island is internationally recognized for concentrations of wintering hawks and owls and is home to the Owl Woods nature reserve. Up to 10 species of owls have been recorded during a single winter. short-eared owls, long-eared owls and great horned owls are among the resident bird population. Visitors from the far and near north - snowy owls, saw-whet owls, and the rare boreal owl as well as eastern screech owls and barred owls – add to the owl population during late fall and winter. Both red-tailed hawks and rough-legged hawks are usually present, and there are annual sightings of bald eagles, peregrine falcons and turkey vultures.

Amherst Island is internationally known as an Important Bird Area and a key migratory location for birds; this fact has caused some concern for those wary of the proposed industrial wind turbine project slated to be built on the island.

The Island is noted for farming, particularly of sheep – of which there are several thousand on the Island, mainly at Stonebrae, Foot Flats, and Topsy Farms. The island's roads, built long ago, have little motorist traffic (excepting the hourly rush for the ferry) making the Island an excellent locale for cycling, especially on the gravel roads that meander along the Island shores. The Island has warm moderate summers, cold brisk winters and steady lake winds most of the year.

"Islands of Life", a report published in 2010 by the Nature Conservancy of Canada, ranks Amherst Island second in biodiversity significance among the islands of northeast Lake Ontario; second only in significance to its larger neighbour, Wolfe Island.

== Dry stone walls ==
The Dry Stone Walling Association of Canada (aka Dry Stone Canada) believes that Amherst Island contains the largest known concentration of historic Irish dry stone walls in Canada. Many of the walls are considered to be at least 160 years old.

== Neilson Store Museum ==
The museum reflects the life and times of the Island with exhibits depicting early schools, industrial tools, family life, natural history and transportation, and collected treasures. The museum building itself is also an exhibit; built in 1883 by the Maxwell Estate and operated by James S. Neilson, an Island grain merchant. The business flourished for nearly a century. The store, docks and the elegant residence across the road, were finally purchased by Ida Isabel Neilson, his widow, from the Estate in 1925. Their sons operated the store until 1971. Over the years, Neilson’s Store and dock became the commercial centre of the Island. It provided services in credit, shipping and receiving goods and produce, storing and selling coal, barley and milled feed.

== Wind farm turbine development ==
Steady lake winds, especially in winter, make some people believe that the island is an ideal potential location for wind turbines. Several companies had expressed interest in developing industrial wind turbine projects on the Island.

Some island residents were opposed to the project, raising concerns that the proposed twenty-six 51-storey wind turbines will have a negative impact on the rich natural and cultural heritage and on tourism, both on the Island and in local mainland communities, as well as on migratory bird, bat and Blanding's Turtle populations. Several groups of residents had formed as a result of the proposals. The Island landowners who had agreed to host turbines on their land have formed Citizens of Amherst Island for Renewable Energy (CAIRE). Those opposed to wind power development on the Island had formed the Association to Protect Amherst Island (APAI) and a coordinated sister group, SaveAI. In January 2012, the Ontario Federation of Agriculture asked the Ontario government to put a moratorium on all wind turbine projects until the health effects of this project and other issues have been properly assessed.

In September 2015, Windlectric Inc., a power generation company based in Oakville, Ontario, agreed to invest CAD272.5 million (US$181.33 million) in the construction and development of Amherst Island wind energy project. The total installed capacity is 74.3 MW, from 26 wind turbine generators. The wind turbines were expected to commence commercial operations in fourth quarter of 2016 or first quarter of 2017 but actually became operational in early 2018.

== See also ==
- List of townships in Ontario
