= List of historic places in Southwestern Ontario =

This is a list of historic places in Southwestern Ontario, containing heritage sites listed on the Canadian Register of Historic Places (CRHP), all of which are designated as historic places either locally, provincially, territorially, nationally, or by more than one level of government.

The following subregions have separate listings:

- County of Brant
- Essex County
- Middlesex County
- Perth County
- Regional Municipality of Waterloo
- Wellington County

== List of historic places in other subregions ==
=== Bruce County ===
Name	Address	Coordinates	Government recognition (CRHP №)	Wikidata ID	Image
Donaldson Site National Historic Site of Canada	Old Bridge Road; Chippawa Hill ON	44°30′19″N 81°20′02″W	Federal (19448)		Upload Photo
Keeper's House	Huron-Kinloss ON	44°04′47″N 81°45′00″W	Federal (4678)		More images
Point Clark Lighthouse National Historic Site of Canada	Amberly; Huron-Kinloss (Point Clark) ON	44°04′22″N 81°45′26″W	Federal (16772, (20813), Ontario (4386)		More images
Kincardine Lighthouse	236 Harbour Street; Kincardine ON	44°10′38″N 81°38′18″W	Federal (11095)		More images
Madison House	343 Durham Market North; Kincardine ON	44°10′39″N 81°38′16″W	Kincardine municipality ([http://www.kincardine.net/public_docs/documents/4641%20343%20DurhamSt.pdf 4641 4641])		
Maple Leaf Cottage	490 Broadway Street; Kincardine ON	44°10′43″N 81°37′32″W	Kincardine municipality ([http://www.kincardine.net/public_docs/documents/88%20056%20490%20Bdwy.pdf 1988-56 1988-56])		Upload Photo
Tower	Cove Island; Northern Bruce Peninsula ON	45°19′37″N 81°44′08″W	Federal (6958)		More images
Lightstation: Annex	Cove Island; Northern Bruce Peninsula ON	45°19′37″N 81°44′06″W	Federal (7035)		More images
Chantry Island Lightstation Tower	Lightstation, Chantry Island; Saugeen Shores ON	44°28′59″N 81°24′00″W	Federal (3293)		More images
Lightkeeper's Dwelling	Lightstation, Chantry Island; Saugeen Shores ON	44°28′59″N 81°24′18″W	Federal (19635)		More images
McNab Point Lighthouse	Bayview Point; Saugeen Shores ON	44°28′19″N 81°23′33″W	Federal (20374)		Upload Photo
Saugeen River Front Range Lighthouse	S. Rankin Street; Saugeen Shores ON	44°30′05″N 81°22′31″W	Federal (20711)		More images
Saugeen River Rear Range Lighthouse	S. Rankin Street; Saugeen Shores ON	44°30′04″N 81°21′59″W	Federal (20712)		Upload Photo
Rear Range Light Tower	Southeastern approach to Stokes Bay; Stokes Bay ON	44°58′15″N 81°22′35″W	Federal (13072)		Upload Photo
Flowerpot Island Lighthouse	Northeast tip of Flowerpot Island; Tobermory ON	45°18′25″N 81°36′52″W	Federal (20661)		
Light Tower	Big Tub Road; Tobermory ON	45°15′28″N 81°40′21″W	Federal (4722)		

=== Chatham-Kent ===
Name	Address	Coordinates	Government recognition (CRHP №)	Wikidata ID	Image
Buxton Settlement National Historic Site of Canada	7th Concession, Dillon and Drake Roads; Chatham-Kent ON	42°16′00″N 82°11′00″W	Federal (1206)		More images
Canadian National Railways/VIA Rail Station	Queen & William Streets; Chatham-Kent ON	42°23′54″N 82°10′44″W	Federal (4584)		
Fairfield on the Thames National Historic Site of Canada	Chatham-Kent ON	42°37′55″N 81°52′11″W	Federal (15726)		More images
Government of Canada Building	120 Wellington Street; Chatham-Kent ON	42°24′16″N 82°11′07″W	Federal (13467)		
Uncle Tom's Cabin - Harris House	29251 Uncle Tom's Road; Chatham-Kent ON	42°35′06″N 82°11′45″W	Ontario (8199)		
Uncle Tom's Cabin - Henson House	29251 Uncle Tom's Road; Chatham-Kent ON	42°35′08″N 82°11′45″W	Ontario (8200)		More images
Uncle Tom's Cabin - Pioneer Church	29251 Uncle Tom's Road; Chatham-Kent ON	42°35′07″N 82°11′46″W	Ontario (8198)		

=== Elgin County ===
Name	Address	Coordinates	Government recognition (CRHP №)	Wikidata ID	Image
Port Burwell Lighthouse	17 Robinson; Bayham ON	42°38′43″N 80°48′24″W	Bayham municipality (7787)		More images
Port Stanley Breakwater Lighthouse	Port Stanley breakwater Port Stanley ON	42°39′18″N 81°12′48″W	Federal (20953)		Upload Photo
Port Stanley National Historic Site of Canada	junction of Bridge, Main and Colbourne Streets; Central Elgin (Port Stanley) ON	42°39′58″N 81°12′43″W	Federal (15722)		
Southwold Earthworks National Historic Site of Canada	Southwold ON	42°40′27″N 81°21′37″W	Federal (11706)		More images
Armoury	Chester and Wilson Streets; St. Thomas ON	42°46′07″N 81°11′46″W	Federal (11057)		Upload Photo
Canada Southern Railway Station	810 Talbot Street; St. Thomas ON	42°46′41″N 81°11′10″W	Federal (6495)		More images
St. Thomas City Hall National Historic Site of Canada	545 Talbot Street; St. Thomas ON	42°46′45″N 81°11′34″W	Federal (9166)		More images
St. Thomas Pioneer Church	55 Walnut Street; St. Thomas ON	42°46′38″N 81°12′22″W	Ontario (10581)		

=== Grey County ===
Name	Address	Coordinates	Government recognition (CRHP №)	Wikidata ID	Image
Tower	Griffith Island; Georgian Bluffs ON	44°51′04″N 80°53′24″W	Federal (3292)		
Billy Bishop Boyhood Home National Historic Site of Canada	948 Third Avenue West; Owen Sound ON	44°33′59″N 80°56′54″W	Federal (4028)		More images
Canadian Pacific Railway Station	First Avenue East (at 12th St. E.); Owen Sound ON	44°34′20″N 80°56′32″W	Federal (4586)		More images
Former Owen Sound Bus Terminal	1023 2nd Avenue East; Owen Sound ON	44°34′06″N 80°56′34″W	Owen Sound municipality (15128)		
Former Reitman's Store	992 2nd Avenue East; Owen Sound ON	44°34′03″N 80°56′36″W	Owen Sound municipality (15129)		Upload Photo

=== Haldimand County ===
Name	Address	Coordinates	Government recognition (CRHP №)	Wikidata ID	Image
Caledonia Town Hall	80 Caithness Street East; Haldimand ON	43°04′23″N 79°56′56″W	Ontario (18022), Haldimand municipality (10808)		
Campbell-Pine House	396 Highway 3 Haldimand ON	42°55′51″N 79°56′11″W	Haldimand municipality (10807)		
Charles Reicheld House	601 Regional Road 12; Haldimand ON	42°50′28″N 79°53′17″W	Haldimand municipality (10900)		Upload Photo
Cook-Peart House	3355 River Road; Haldimand ON	43°00′12″N 79°52′44″W	Haldimand municipality (10264)		Upload Photo
Cottonwood Mansion	740 Regional Road 53; Haldimand ON	42°49′07″N 79°55′30″W	Haldimand municipality (10896)		
Cranston Post Office	915 Regional Road 29; Haldimand ON	43°00′27″N 79°57′04″W	Haldimand municipality (10909)		Upload Photo
Dochstader Hotel	3220 River Road; Haldimand ON	43°00′17″N 79°52′44″W	Haldimand municipality (10954)		Upload Photo
Duff House	5 Mohawk Street East; Cayuga ON	42°57′08″N 79°51′19″W	Cayuga municipality (10957)		
Edmondson-Weaver House	1613 Concession 13; Haldimand ON	42°53′33″N 80°10′04″W	Haldimand municipality (10976)		Upload Photo
Empire School	3038 Regional Road 9 (York Road); Haldimand ON	43°02′12″N 79°56′38″W	Haldimand municipality (15226)		Upload Photo
Enniskillen Lodge	39 Front Street; Haldimand ON	43°02′12″N 79°56′38″W	Haldimand municipality (11108)		Upload Photo
Furry Tavern	2511 North Shore Road; Haldimand ON	42°51′40″N 79°28′08″W	Haldimand municipality (10089)		Upload Photo
Gibson-Alderson House	4830 Highway 6 Haldimand ON	43°03′32″N 79°58′06″W	Haldimand municipality (10834)		Upload Photo
Gibson-Bunn Building	19 Cayuga Street North; Cayuga ON	42°57′01″N 79°51′31″W	Cayuga municipality (10098)		
The Gore School	699 Haldimand Road 9 Haldimand ON	42°57′42″N 79°58′18″W	Haldimand municipality (11177)		Upload Photo
Gypsum Mines School	1256 Regional Road 17; Haldimand ON	42°55′22″N 79°47′25″W	Haldimand municipality (11000)		Upload Photo
Hoover Log House	95 Concession 4 Haldimand ON	42°49′44″N 79°55′48″W	Haldimand municipality (11109)		Upload Photo
Jeffrey Residence	1615 Concession 13; Haldimand ON	42°53′33″N 80°10′03″W	Haldimand municipality (11141)		Upload Photo
John Fry House	1915 Regional Road 3 Haldimand ON	42°51′30″N 79°41′34″W	Haldimand municipality (11142)		Upload Photo
Jones-Doughty Residence	53 Talbot Street East; Jarvis ON	42°53′06″N 80°06′34″W	Jarvis municipality (11143)		
Kirkland House	3062 River Road; Haldimand ON	42°54′48″N 79°47′13″W	Haldimand municipality (11144)		Upload Photo
Lalor Estate	241 Broad Street West; Dunnville ON	42°54′19″N 79°37′19″W	Dunnville municipality (11149)		
Mohawk Island Lighthouse	Mohawk Island National Wildlife Area; Haldimand ON	42°50′04″N 79°31′21″W	Federal (9770, (20801)		More images
McKinnon-Smith Residence	156 Caithness Street East; Haldimand ON	43°04′21″N 79°56′47″W	Haldimand municipality (10931)		
Mooney Residence	210 Broad Street West; Dunnville ON	42°54′16″N 79°37′16″W	Dunnville municipality (11164)		
Murray-Walton House and Farm	266 Irish Line; Haldimand ON	42°55′43″N 79°51′56″W	Haldimand municipality (11167)		Upload Photo
Nanticoke National Historic Site of Canada	38 Rainham Road; Haldimand (Nanticoke) ON	42°47′50″N 80°03′11″W	Federal (17701)		
Old Caledonia Mill	149 Forfar Street West; Haldimand ON	43°04′18″N 79°57′29″W	Haldimand municipality (11169)		
Ruthven Gatehouse	243 Highway 54; Haldimand (Cayuga) ON	42°58′53″N 79°52′18″W	Ontario (10547)		Upload Photo
Ruthven Park	243 Highway 54; Haldimand (Cayuga) ON	42°58′53″N 79°52′24″W	Federal (12099), Ontario (10564), Haldimand (Cayuga) municipality (11134)		
St. John's Parish Hall	Front Street; Haldimand ON	43°02′12″N 79°56′38″W	Haldimand municipality (11176)		Upload Photo
Seneca Bridge	651 Caithness Street East; Haldimand ON	43°03′54″N 79°56′01″W	Haldimand municipality (11173)		
Thompson-Colwell House	86 Sutherland Street East; Haldimand ON	43°04′27″N 79°56′52″W	Haldimand municipality (11178)		
Toll House	4 Argyle Street North; Haldimand ON	43°04′24″N 79°57′06″W	Haldimand municipality (10932)		
Upper Farm Cemetery	863 Keith Richardson Parkway; Haldimand ON	42°53′37″N 80°08′29″W	Haldimand municipality (10606)		
Union School	34 Main Street W Haldimand (Selkirk) ON	42°49′59″N 79°56′12″W	Haldimand (Selkirk) municipality (11179)		
Vanderburgh House	4163 Highway 3 Haldimand ON	42°52′16″N 79°46′53″W	Haldimand municipality (10869)		Upload Photo
Wilson Pugsley MacDonald Museum	3513 Rainham Road; Haldimand ON	42°49′37″N 79°58′31″W	Haldimand municipality (10591)		

=== Huron County ===
Name	Address	Coordinates	Government recognition (CRHP №)	Wikidata ID	Image
Carolinian Oak Tree	81340 Mill Place; Ashfield–Colborne–Wawanosh ON	43°45′08″N 81°42′59″W	Ashfield–Colborne–Wawanosh municipality (15674)		Upload Photo
Acheson House	55 Nelson; Goderich ON	43°44′44″N 81°42′30″W	Goderich municipality (14797)		
Captain Dancy House	108 East Street; Goderich ON	43°44′35″N 81°42′22″W	Goderich municipality (14145)		
The Cottage	135 Essex Street; Goderich ON	43°44′15″N 81°43′26″W	Goderich municipality (15293)		
Ford House	34 Wellington Street South; Goderich ON	43°44′31″N 81°43′04″W	Goderich municipality (15252)		
Former Bank of Upper Canada Building	46 West Street; Goderich ON	43°44′34″N 81°42′47″W	Goderich municipality (14181)		
Garrow House	65 Montreal Street; Goderich ON	43°44′29″N 81°42′48″W	Goderich municipality (14146)		
Garvey House	97 St. Patrick; Goderich ON	43°44′38″N 81°42′57″W	Goderich municipality (14590)		Upload Photo
Geary House	133 St. Georges Crescent; Goderich ON	43°44′42″N 81°42′59″W	Goderich municipality (14147)		
Gibbons Townhouse	33 Montreal Street; Goderich ON	43°44′32″N 81°42′45″W	Goderich municipality (14148)		
Goderich Canadian Pacific Railway Station	1 Ship; Goderich ON	43°44′41″N 81°43′33″W	Goderich municipality (14594)		More images
Goderich Public Library	52 Montreal Street; Goderich ON	43°44′29″N 81°42′49″W	Goderich municipality (14182)		
Goderich Town Hall	57 West Street; Goderich ON	43°44′35″N 81°42′51″W	Goderich municipality (14162)		
Hands Bakery	169 West Street; Goderich ON	43°44′35″N 81°43′07″W	Goderich municipality (14163)		
Henry Horton Cottage	156 East Street; Goderich ON	43°44′35″N 81°42′14″W	Goderich municipality (14721)		
Hunter House	66 Victoria Street North; Goderich ON	43°44′43″N 81°42′28″W	Goderich municipality (14164)		
Huron County Gaol National Historic Site of Canada	181 Victoria Street North; Goderich ON	43°44′59″N 81°42′28″W	Federal (12027)		
Huron County Museum	110 North Street; Goderich ON	43°44′49″N 81°42′40″W	Goderich municipality (14165)		
Hutchinson House	191 Britannia; Goderich ON	43°44′21″N 81°43′16″W	Goderich municipality (14902)		
Judges' House	85 Essex; Goderich ON	43°44′24″N 81°43′27″W	Goderich municipality (14589)		
Lawson House	37 Essex Street; Goderich ON	43°44′31″N 81°43′20″W	Goderich municipality (14806)		Upload Photo
Menesetung Bridge	Goderich ON	43°45′05″N 81°42′50″W	Ontario (14596), Goderich municipality (15690)		More images
Polley's Livery Stable	35 South Street; Goderich ON	43°44′29″N 81°42′40″W	Goderich municipality (14202)		
Samuel Platt House	148 Victoria Street North; Goderich ON	43°44′53″N 81°42′28″W	Goderich municipality (14937)		
Seegmiller House	87 St. Patrick Street; Goderich ON	43°44′38″N 81°42′53″W	Goderich municipality (14144)		Upload Photo
Sloane-Cooper House	80 Hamilton Street; Goderich ON	43°44′42″N 81°42′31″W	Goderich municipality (14166)		
The Square	Goderich ON	43°44′35″N 81°42′40″W	Goderich municipality (7450)		More images
Strachan House	20 Wellington Street South; Goderich ON	43°44′33″N 81°43′04″W	Goderich municipality (15251)		
Thomas Mercer Jones House	168 West Street; Goderich ON	43°44′35″N 81°43′07″W	Goderich municipality (14167)		
Tom House	82 Wellesley Street; Goderich ON	43°44′25″N 81°43′16″W	Goderich municipality (14168)		
Wellesley House	203 Lighthouse Street; Goderich ON	43°44′32″N 81°43′15″W	Goderich municipality (14169)		
West Street Heritage Conservation District	West Street; Goderich ON	43°44′34″N 81°42′47″W	Goderich municipality (14681)		
Whitely House	58 Elgin Avenue East; Goderich ON	43°44′26″N 81°42′32″W	Goderich municipality (14947)		
Box Residence	57 High Street; Huron East ON	43°33′08″N 81°23′45″W	Huron East municipality (14563)		Upload Photo
Britton House	12 Church Street; Huron East ON	43°33′18″N 81°23′43″W	Huron East municipality (15688)		Upload Photo
Brussels Library	402 Turnberry Street; Huron East ON	43°44′39″N 81°14′59″W	Huron East municipality (15405)		More images
Cameron House	84354 McNabb Line; Huron East ON	43°42′15″N 81°11′38″W	Huron East municipality (15406)		Upload Photo
Cardno Block	39 Main Street South; Huron East ON	43°33′16″N 81°23′33″W	Huron East municipality (14565)		
Carnohan House	123 James Street; Huron East ON	43°33′25″N 81°23′55″W	Huron East municipality (14568)		Upload Photo
Carroll Residence	131 Goderich Street; Huron East ON	43°33′23″N 81°24′00″W	Huron East municipality (14569)		Upload Photo
Commercial Hotel	84 Main Street South; Huron East ON	43°33′05″N 81°23′43″W	Huron East municipality (15407)		Upload Photo
Cornish Residence	17 Helen Street; Huron East ON	43°33′24″N 81°23′54″W	Huron East municipality (14850)		Upload Photo
Doig Residence	98 Goderich Street West; Huron East ON	43°33′20″N 81°23′53″W	Huron East municipality (14851)		Upload Photo
The Former Seaforth Public School	13 Church Street; Huron East ON	43°33′18″N 81°23′43″W	Huron East municipality (15421)		
Hansen Residence	23 Sparling Street; Huron East ON	43°33′20″N 81°24′00″W	Huron East municipality (14566)		Upload Photo
Harpurhey Cemetery	Harpurhey Road; Huron East ON	43°33′37″N 81°24′59″W	Huron East municipality (15408)		
Horthy House	87 Main Street North; Huron East ON	43°33′24″N 81°23′27″W	Huron East municipality (15409)		
McIver Residence	41 John Street; Huron East ON	43°33′12″N 81°23′42″W	Huron East municipality (14582)		Upload Photo
Moncrieff Church	83506 Livingston Line; Huron East ON	43°38′36″N 81°09′14″W	Huron East municipality (15423)		Upload Photo
Mullen House	92 Goderich Street; Huron East ON	43°33′18″N 81°23′50″W	Huron East municipality (14570)		Upload Photo
Pinkney House	31 Goderich Street West; Huron East ON	43°33′23″N 81°24′00″W	Huron East municipality (15415)		Upload Photo
Pletsch Residence	19 Sparling Street; Huron East ON	43°33′21″N 81°23′59″W	Huron East municipality (14530)		Upload Photo
Round House	140 Duke Street; Huron East ON	43°33′24″N 81°23′17″W	Huron East municipality (14592)		Upload Photo
Seaforth Heritage Conservation District	Main Street; Huron East ON	43°33′06″N 81°23′42″W	Huron East municipality (15418)		Upload Photo
Seaforth Town Hall	72 Main Street; Huron East ON	43°33′06″N 81°23′42″W	Huron East municipality (14567)		
The Shepherd Residence	148 Goderich Street West; Huron East ON	43°33′24″N 81°24′04″W	Huron East municipality (15956)		Upload Photo
Van Egmond Residence	80 Kippen Road; Huron East (Tuckersmith) ON	43°32′21″N 81°24′19″W	Huron East (Tuckersmith) municipality (15422)		
Vanastra Park Gate and Posts	London Road; Huron East ON	43°34′56″N 81°31′43″W	Huron East municipality (15424)		
Victoria Park	Victoria Street at Gouinlock Street; Huron East ON	43°33′05″N 81°23′35″W	Huron East municipality (15425)		
W.J. Carling House	73 Huron Street West; South Huron ON	43°13′N 81°17′W	South Huron municipality (7790)		Upload Photo

=== Lambton County ===
Name	Address	Coordinates	Government recognition (CRHP №)	Wikidata ID	Image
First Commercial Oil Field National Historic Site of Canada	Oil Springs ON	42°47′00″N 82°07′00″W	Federal (1148)		More images
Government of Canada Building	105 Christina Street; Sarnia ON	42°58′14″N 82°24′29″W	Sarnia municipality (2887)		
Independent Order Odd Fellows Ridgely Lodge #250	2594 Kelly Road; Oil Springs ON	42°47′03″N 82°07′12″W	Oil Springs municipality (17941)		
Langbank Post Office	2423 Kelly Road; Oil Springs ON	42°46′27″N 82°07′12″W	Oil Springs municipality (17962)		
Oil Springs Community Hall	4596 Oil Springs Line; Oil Springs ON	42°46′27″N 82°07′12″W	Oil Springs municipality (17961)		
Oil Springs Railway Station	2423 Kelly Road; Oil Springs ON	42°46′22″N 82°07′18″W	Oil Springs municipality (18021)		
Old Post Office	4189 Petrolia Line; Petrolia ON	42°52′54″N 82°08′51″W	Petrolia municipality (17984)		
Petrolia Orange Hall (destroyed by fire in 2004)	4224 Petrolia Line; Petrolia ON	42°52′55″N 82°08′42″W	Petrolia municipality (1505)		Upload Photo
Petrolia Public Library	4200 Petrolia Line; Petrolia ON	42°52′55″N 82°08′47″W	Petrolia municipality (17983)		
VIA Rail Station	125 Green Street; Sarnia ON	42°57′28″N 82°23′20″W	Sarnia municipality (4628)		
Victoria Hall / Petrolia Town Hall National Historic Site of Canada	411 Greenfield Street; Petrolia ON	42°52′50″N 82°08′47″W	Federal (7551)		More images
Walpole Island Lower A32 Lighthouse	Off Walpole Island in the St. Clair River; Walpole Island ON	42°36′42″N 82°31′03″W	Federal (21033)		Upload Photo
Walpole Island Upper A34 Lighthouse	Off Walpole Island in the St. Clair River opposite Algonac Michigan; Walpole Island ON	42°37′20″N 82°30′41″W	Federal (21034)		Upload Photo

=== Norfolk County ===
Name	Address	Coordinates	Government recognition (CRHP №)	Wikidata ID	Image
Lighttower	Tip of Long Point, south of Port Dover; Long POint ON	42°32′56″N 80°02′57″W	Federal (11199)		
Backhouse Grist Mill National Historic Site of Canada	RR 3 Norfolk ON	42°37′00″N 80°28′00″W	Federal (7554)		More images
Cliff Site National Historic Site of Canada	Brant Hill in Port Dover; Norfolk ON	42°47′08″N 80°11′46″W	Federal (13398)		
Fort Norfolk National Historic Site of Canada	Norfolk ON	42°41′56″N 80°19′31″W	Federal (16785)		
Lynnwood/Campbell-Reid House National Historic Site of Canada	21 Lynnwood Avenue; Norfolk ON	42°50′16″N 80°18′12″W	Federal (12402)		
Van Norman-Guiler House	2318 Front Road; Norfolk (Normandale) ON	42°42′39″N 80°18′45″W	Ontario (15347)		Upload Photo
Lighttower	End of west pier Port Dover ON	42°46′52″N 80°12′06″W	Federal (4739, (20710)		

=== Oxford County ===
Name	Address	Coordinates	Government recognition (CRHP №)	Wikidata ID	Image
African Methodist Episcopal Cemetery	Church St (Pick Line), Otterville; Norwich ON	42°55′53″N 80°36′30″W	Norwich municipality (10775)		
Annandale House	30 Tillson Avenue, Tillsonburg; Tillsonburg ON	42°51′44″N 80°43′18″W	Federal (4178), Ontario (18001)		More images
Curries United Church	465003 Curries Road, Curries; Norwich ON	43°04′17″N 80°43′14″W	Norwich municipality (10925)		
Knox Presbyterian Church (Norwich)	67 Main Street West, Norwich; Norwich ON	42°59′13″N 80°36′04″W	Norwich municipality (11678)		
Museum School	656 Main Street North, Burgessville; Norwich ON	43°01′39″N 80°39′18″W	Norwich municipality (11828)		
Norwich Gore United Church	89 Stover Street North, Norwich; Norwich ON	42°59′44″N 80°36′01″W	Norwich municipality (11848)		
Norwich United Church and Manse	80 Main Street West, Norwich; Norwich ON	42°59′14″N 80°36′05″W	Norwich municipality (11849)		
Otter Creek Bridge	Middletown Line (just west of Otterville); Norwich ON	42°53′50″N 80°37′10″W	Norwich municipality (11865)		More images
Otterville Mill	Main St W, Otterville; Norwich ON	42°55′30″N 80°36′22″W	Norwich municipality (11864)		
Otterville Park	William St, Otterville; Norwich ON	42°55′43″N 80°36′11″W	Norwich municipality (11866)		
Otterville Railway Museum	Main Street W, Otterville; Norwich ON	42°55′25″N 80°37′11″W	Norwich municipality (11867)		
Quaker Meeting House (Norwich Museum)	89 Stover Street North, Norwich; Norwich ON	42°59′42″N 80°36′00″W	Norwich municipality (11893)		
Quaker Street Burying Ground	8 Quaker Street (just north of Norwich village); Norwich ON	43°00′06″N 80°36′24″W	Norwich municipality (11894)		
Woodlawn Place	Main Street West, Otterville; Norwich ON	42°55′25″N 80°37′09″W	Norwich municipality (9941)		
Old St. Paul's Church (Anglican)	723 Dundas Street, Woodstock; Woodstock ON	43°07′56″N 80°44′47″W	Ontario (10544)		
Woodstock Railway Station	94 Victoria Street South, Woodstock; Woodstock ON	43°07′35″N 80°45′07″W	Federal (4610)		More images
Old Woodstock Town Hall	500 Dundas Street, Woodstock; Woodstock ON	43°07′46″N 80°45′27″W	Federal (4257), Ontario (8207)		More images

== See also ==
- List of historic places in Ontario
- List of National Historic Sites of Canada in Ontario
