= McKinley House =

McKinley House or McKinley Home may refer to:

- Johnson Camden McKinley House, a historic house in Wheeling, West Virginia, United States
- McKinley Birthplace Home and Research Center, birthplace of U.S. President William McKinley, Niles, Ohio, United States
- McKinley House, a historic place in Lanark County, Eastern Ontario, Canada
