= List of historic places in Northern Ontario =

This is a list of historic places in Northern Ontario, containing heritage sites listed on the Canadian Register of Historic Places (CRHP), all of which are designated as historic places either locally, provincially, territorially, nationally, or by more than one level of government. Listings in Greater Sudbury are listed separately.

== List of historic places outside Greater Sudbury ==
=== Algoma District ===
Name	Address	Coordinates	Government recognition (CRHP №)	Wikidata ID	Image
Light Tower	Caribou Island; Caribou Island ON	47°20′23″N 85°49′34″W	Federal (10361)		
Former Canadian National Railways Station	West End Road (at 2nd Ave.); Hornepayne ON	49°13′12″N 84°46′34″W	Federal (4588)		More images
Fort St. Joseph National Historic Site of Canada	St. Joseph Island; Jocelyn ON	46°05′05″N 83°53′45″W	Federal (12976)		More images
Light Tower	Michipicoten Island; Michipicoten ON	47°45′14″N 85°35′48″W	Federal (10365)		Upload Photo
Rydal Bank Church	1634 Highway 638; Plummer Additional ON	46°17′55″N 83°47′37″W	Plummer Additional municipality (8177)		Upload Photo
Rydal Bank Community Hall	16 Hoath Street; Plummer Additional ON	46°17′55″N 83°47′37″W	Plummer Additional municipality (8176)		Upload Photo
34-36 Herrick Street	34 Herrick Street; Sault Ste. Marie ON	46°30′28″N 84°19′22″W	Sault Ste. Marie municipality (7374)		More images
115 Upton	115 Upton Road; Sault Ste. Marie ON	46°30′21″N 84°18′50″W	Sault Ste. Marie municipality (7348)		Upload Photo
143 McGregor Avenue	143 McGregor Avenue; Sault Ste. Marie ON	46°30′22″N 84°18′41″W	Sault Ste. Marie municipality (6141)		More images
Algoma Central Engine House	Highway 532; Unorganized North Algoma District (Searchmont) ON	46°46′59″N 84°03′14″W	Federal (4614, (7532)		More images
Algonquin Hotel	864 Queen Street East; Sault Ste. Marie ON	46°30′23″N 84°19′23″W	Sault Ste. Marie municipality (3572)		More images
Barnes-Fawcett Block	358 Queen Street; Sault Ste. Marie ON	46°30′46″N 84°20′03″W	Sault Ste. Marie municipality (7375)		More images
Bishop Fauquier Memorial Chapel	1540 Queen Street East; Sault Ste. Marie ON	46°30′00″N 84°17′14″W	Sault Ste. Marie municipality (3313)		More images
Bishop Fauquier Memorial Chapel Cemetery	1540 Queen Street East; Sault Ste. Marie ON	46°30′00″N 84°17′12″W	Sault Ste. Marie municipality (3574)		More images
Buchan House	943 Landslide Road; Sault Ste. Marie ON	46°35′36″N 84°16′48″W	Sault Ste. Marie municipality (5600)		More images
Central United Church	160 Spring Street; Sault Ste. Marie ON	46°30′40″N 84°19′46″W	Ontario (5601), Sault Ste. Marie municipality (4222)		More images
Clergue Blockhouse	831 Queen Street East; Sault Ste. Marie ON	46°30′23″N 84°19′29″W	Sault Ste. Marie municipality (5595)		More images
Coronation Block	234 Queen Street East; Sault Ste. Marie ON	46°30′53″N 84°20′12″W	Sault Ste. Marie municipality (7356)		More images
Dawson Block	708 Queen Street East; Sault Ste. Marie ON	46°30′28″N 84°19′39″W	Sault Ste. Marie municipality (8329)		More images
Eastbourne	1048 Queen Street East; Sault Ste. Marie ON	46°30′20″N 84°18′50″W	Sault Ste. Marie municipality (4056)		More images
Ermatinger House National Historic Site of Canada	831 Queen Street East; Sault Ste. Marie ON	46°30′23″N 84°19′26″W	Federal (7415), Sault Ste. Marie municipality (5602)		More images
Forest Insect Laboratory	875 Queen Street East; Sault Ste. Marie ON	46°30′20″N 84°19′21″W	Sault Ste. Marie municipality (5528)		More images
Hussey Block	246 Queen Street East; Sault Ste. Marie ON	46°30′53″N 84°20′12″W	Sault Ste. Marie municipality (7685)		More images
North West Company Lock	75 Huron Street; Sault Ste. Marie ON	46°30′54″N 84°19′21″W	Sault Ste. Marie municipality (5529)		More images
Old Post Office (Sault Ste. Marie Museum)	690 Queen Street East; Sault Ste. Marie ON	46°30′29″N 84°19′40″W	Sault Ste. Marie municipality (5519)		More images
Old Town Cemetery	1186 Queen Street East; Sault Ste. Marie ON	46°30′18″N 84°18′21″W	Sault Ste. Marie municipality (5550)		More images
Ontario Provincial Air Service Hangars	69 Church Street; Sault Ste. Marie ON	46°30′17″N 84°19′26″W	Sault Ste. Marie municipality (5530)		More images
Precious Blood Cathedral	778 Queen Street East; Sault Ste. Marie ON	46°30′27″N 84°19′33″W	Ontario (8185), Sault Ste. Marie municipality (5604)		More images
Rotary Welcome Cairns	Russ Ramsay Way; Sault Ste. Marie ON	46°30′29″N 84°19′54″W	Sault Ste. Marie municipality (7768)		More images
Sault Ste. Marie Canal National Historic Site of Canada	1 Canal Drive; Sault Ste. Marie ON	46°30′44″N 84°21′16″W	Federal (4431)		More images
Sault Ste. Marie Canal Office Building	1 Canal Drive; Sault Ste. Marie ON	46°30′42″N 84°21′26″W	Federal (11363)		More images
Sault Ste. Marie Canal Power House	1 Canal Drive; Sault Ste. Marie ON	46°30′48″N 84°20′59″W	Federal (16389)		More images
Sault Ste. Marie Canal Superintendent's House	1 Canal Drive; Sault Ste. Marie ON	46°30′50″N 84°21′19″W	Federal (11300)		More images
Sault Ste. Marie Canal Workshop	1 Canal Drive; Sault Ste. Marie ON	46°30′48″N 84°20′59″W	Federal (11320)		More images
Sault Ste. Marie Cenotaph	426 Queen Street East; Sault Ste. Marie ON	46°30′42″N 84°19′58″W	Sault Ste. Marie municipality (8437)		More images
Sault Ste. Marie District Courthouse	420 Queen Street East; Sault Ste. Marie ON	46°30′43″N 84°19′57″W	Sault Ste. Marie municipality (5611)		More images
Tower	Southern tip of Ile Parisienne, northwest of Sault Ste. Marie in Lake Superior; Sault Ste. Marie ON	46°38′43″N 84°43′26″W	Federal (11494)		Upload Photo
Upton	10 Kensington Terrace; Sault Ste. Marie ON	46°30′22″N 84°18′43″W	Sault Ste. Marie municipality (7767)		More images
Lighttower	Northern tip of Shoal Island, in the St. Mary River; St. Joseph ON	46°18′48″N 84°04′33″W	Federal (13164)		Upload Photo
Wellington Square Townhouses	780 Wellington Street East; Sault Ste. Marie ON	46°30′35″N 84°19′15″W	Sault Ste. Marie municipality (7376)		More images
Whitefish Island National Historic Site of Canada	Sault Ste. Marie ON	46°30′36″N 84°21′04″W	Federal (14945)		More images
Canadian Pacific Railway Station	Winnipeg Street (between Elgin & Durham Streets); White River ON		Federal (4613)		More images

=== Cochrane District ===
Name	Address	Coordinates	Government recognition (CRHP №)	Wikidata ID	Image
Public Building	22 Circle Street; Kapuskasing ON	49°25′02″N 82°25′29″W	Federal (4063)		Upload Photo
HBC Staff House	4 Front Street; Moose Factory ON	51°15′08″N 80°36′22″W	Ontario (8854)		More images
HBC Worker's House - McLeod House	2 Museum Street; Moose Factory ON	51°15′15″N 80°36′16″W	Ontario (8855)		
HBC Worker's House - Sackabuckiskum House	2 Museum Street; Moose Factory ON	51°15′15″N 80°36′13″W	Ontario (8857)		More images
HBC Worker's House - Turner House	2 Museum Street; Moose Factory ON	51°15′14″N 80°36′18″W	Ontario (8856)		Upload Photo
Moose Factory Buildings National Historic Site of Canada	Moosonee ON	51°16′45″N 80°38′20″W	Federal (10481)		More images

=== Kenora District ===
Name	Address	Coordinates	Government recognition (CRHP №)	Wikidata ID	Image
Kenora Canadian Pacific Railway Station	Railway Street; Kenora ON		Federal (4545)		More images
Sioux Lookout railway station CNR	53 Front Street; Sioux Lookout ON	50°05′51″N 91°54′59″W	Federal (6906), Ontario (8900)		More images

=== Manitoulin District ===
Name	Address	Coordinates	Government recognition (CRHP №)	Wikidata ID	Image
Janet Head Light Tower	Lot 25, West Range; Gore Bay (Janet Head) ON	45°56′48″N 82°29′00″W	Federal (16129)		
Light station Tower	Great Duck Island; West Part, Manitoulin ON	45°39′05″N 82°57′12″W	Federal (10937)		Upload Photo
Manitowaning Lighttower	Arthur Street; Manitowaning ON	45°44′41″N 81°48′18″W	Federal (21067)		
Sheguiandah National Historic Site of Canada	Northeastern Manitoulin and the Islands (Sheguiandah) ON	45°52′42″N 81°54′24″W	Federal (14555)		Upload Photo
Fog Alarm	Mississagi Island; Unorganized West Manitoulin District ON	45°53′28″N 83°13′32″W	Federal (9603)		Upload Photo
Lighttower	Mississagi Island; Unorganized West Manitoulin District ON	45°53′28″N 83°13′32″W	Federal (9623)		

=== Nipissing District ===
Name	Address	Coordinates	Government recognition (CRHP №)	Wikidata ID	Image
Canadian National Railway Station	172 Second Avenue West; North Bay ON		Federal (6810)		Upload Photo
North Bay CNR Station	214 Second Avenue; North Bay ON	46°18′51″N 79°27′40″W	Ontario (8182)		Upload Photo
North Bay CPR Station	100 Ferguson Street; North Bay ON		Federal (6903), Ontario (8183)		Upload Photo
Power Cavern and Control Building	Canadian Air Defence Sector (CADS) Complex; North Bay ON	46°20′14″N 79°24′35″W	Federal (13174)		Upload Photo
Algonquin Provincial Park National Historic Site of Canada	Unorganized South Nipissing District ON	45°33′00″N 78°35′00″W	Federal (3249)		More images

=== Rainy River District ===
Name	Address	Coordinates	Government recognition (CRHP №)	Wikidata ID	Image
Federal Building	301 Scott Street; Fort Frances ON	48°36′36″N 93°23′43″W	Federal (9485)		
Fort St. Pierre National Historic Site of Canada	Point Park; Fort Frances ON	48°36′55″N 93°21′23″W	Federal (18945)		Upload Photo
Former Canadian National Railway Station	4th Street West (west of Central Avenue); Fort Frances ON	48°36′49″N 93°24′15″W	Federal (6809)		
Kay-Nah-Chi-Wah-Nung National Historic Site of Canada	Morley (Stratton) ON	48°38′46″N 94°04′30″W	Federal (12056)		More images

=== Sudbury District ===
Name	Address	Coordinates	Government recognition (CRHP №)	Wikidata ID	Image
Canadian Pacific Railway Station	Spencer Avenue; Cartier ON	46°42′21″N 81°33′27″W	Federal (4608)		More images
Killarney Lighthouse	Killarney ON	45°58′06″N 81°29′20″W	Federal (9685)		More images
Killarney Northwest Lighthouse	Southern tip of Partridge Island; Killarney ON	45°59′02″N 81°31′56″W	Federal (10240)		Upload Photo

=== Thunder Bay District ===
Name	Address	Coordinates	Government recognition (CRHP №)	Wikidata ID	Image
VIA Rail/Canadian National Railway Station	Railway Avenue (at Main St.); Greenstone (Nakina) ON	50°10′37″N 86°42′47″W	Federal (6802)		More images
Pic River Site National Historic Site of Canada	Pic River 50 ON	48°37′33″N 86°16′56″W	Federal (15782)		Upload Photo
Canadian Pacific Railway Station	Brunswick Street; Schreiber ON		Federal (4609)		More images
Armoury	317 Park Avenue; Thunder Bay ON	48°26′11″N 89°13′41″W	Federal (9616)		Upload Photo
Canadian Car & Foundry National Historic Site of Canada	1001 Montreal Street; Thunder Bay ON	48°21′32″N 89°18′04″W	Federal (16408)		
Cummins Pre-contact Site National Historic Site of Canada	Mapleward Road, Cummins Pond; Thunder Bay ON		Federal (16843)		Upload Photo
Federal Building	130 Syndicate Ave South; Thunder Bay ON	48°22′59″N 89°14′52″W	Federal (10463)		Upload Photo
Finnish Labour Temple National Historic Site of Canada	314 Bay Street; Thunder Bay ON	48°25′56″N 89°13′48″W	Federal (18724)		More images
Lamb Island Lighthouse	Lamb Island, 90km east of Thunder Bay in Lake Huron; Thunder Bay ON	48°36′08″N 88°08′37″W	Federal (20797)		Upload Photo
Revenue Canada Building	201 May Street North; Thunder Bay ON	48°23′13″N 89°14′46″W	Federal (4767)		More images
Thunder Bay Tourist Pagoda National Historic Site of Canada	164 Arthur Street; Thunder Bay ON	48°26′05″N 89°13′08″W	Federal (7763)		More images
Union Station (Canadian Pacific Railway Station)	440 Syndicate Avenue South; Thunder Bay ON		Federal (4546)		More images
Lighttower	Eastern tip of Davieaux Island, Lake Superior; Unorganized Thunder Bay District ON	47°41′41″N 85°48′19″W	Federal (4758)		Upload Photo
Lightstation: Tower	Battle Island, Lake Superior; Unorganized Thunder Bay District ON	48°45′06″N 87°33′26″W	Federal (9683)		Upload Photo

=== Timiskaming District ===
Name	Address	Coordinates	Government recognition (CRHP №)	Wikidata ID	Image
Cobalt Mining District National Historic Site of Canada	Cobalt ON	47°23′51″N 79°40′30″W	Federal (4183)		More images
Cobalt O.N.R. Station	1 Station Road; Cobalt ON	47°23′45″N 79°41′03″W	Ontario (10423)		More images
Sir Harry Oakes Chateau	2 Chateau Drive; Kirkland Lake ON	48°08′55″N 80°02′54″W	Ontario (8170)		More images

== See also ==
- List of historic places in Ontario
- List of National Historic Sites of Canada in Ontario
