= List of historic places in Ontario =

This list of historic places in the province of Ontario contains heritage sites listed on the Canadian Register of Historic Places (CRHP), all of which are designated as historic places either locally, provincially, territorially, nationally, or by more than one level of government.

For reasons of length, the list has been divided by regions and subregions. See separate lists for the following areas:

- Central Ontario
- Eastern Ontario
  - Kingston
  - Ottawa
- Golden Horseshoe
  - Regional Municipality of Niagara
  - Regional Municipality of Peel
  - Toronto
  - Regional Municipality of York
- Northern Ontario
  - Greater Sudbury
- Southwestern Ontario
  - County of Brant
  - Essex County
  - Middlesex County
  - Perth County
  - Regional Municipality of Waterloo
  - Wellington County

== Ontario Heritage Act Register ==
The Ontario Heritage Trust maintains a register on their website (see here), "a searchable database that provides information about properties in Ontario that have been designated using the Ontario Heritage Act (OHA)."

== See also ==
- List of National Historic Sites of Canada in Ontario
