= List of historic places in Central Ontario =

This is a list of historic places in Central Ontario, containing heritage sites listed on the Canadian Register of Historic Places (CRHP), all of which are designated as historic places either locally, provincially, territorially, nationally, or by more than one level of government.

== List of historic places ==
=== Dufferin County ===
Name	Address	Coordinates	Government recognition (CRHP №)	Wikidata ID	Image
Dufferin County Court House	51 Zina Street; Orangeville ON	43°55′21″N 80°39′48″W	Ontario (10426)		More images

=== Haliburton County ===
Name	Address	Coordinates	Government recognition (CRHP №)	Wikidata ID	Image
Wilberforce Red Cross Outpost National Historic Site of Canada	2314 Loop Road (Highway 648); Highlands East ON	45°02′17″N 78°13′24″W	Federal (7740)		

=== Hastings County ===
Name	Address	Coordinates	Government recognition (CRHP №)	Wikidata ID	Image
Armoury	Bridge and Pinnacle Streets; Belleville ON	44°09′49″N 77°22′54″W	Federal (9706)		More images
Belleville Railway Station (Grand Trunk) National Historic Site of Canada	240 Station Street; Belleville ON	44°10′44″N 77°22′27″W	Federal (7368, (4552)		More images
Government of Canada Building	11 Station Street; Belleville ON	44°10′12″N 77°23′05″W	Federal (16123)		Upload Photo
Bellevue Terrace	10 Patterson Street; Belleville ON	44°09′59″N 77°23′00″W	Ontario (6302)		Upload Photo
Glanmore / Phillips-Faulkner House National Historic Site of Canada	257 Bridge Street East; Belleville ON	44°06′00″N 77°13′13″W	Federal (12079)		More images
9 Hangar	84 North Star Drive, CFB Trenton; Quinte West ON	44°06′54″N 77°32′21″W	Federal (11619)		Upload Photo
10 Hangar	52 North Star Drive, CFB Trenton; Quinte West ON	44°06′54″N 77°32′21″W	Federal (11508)		Upload Photo
Building 21	CFB Trenton; Quinte West ON	44°06′49″N 77°32′39″W	Federal (11470)		Upload Photo
Building 22	CFB Trenton; Quinte West ON	44°06′51″N 77°32′55″W	Federal (11472)		Upload Photo
Building 23	CFB Trenton; Quinte West ON	44°06′54″N 77°32′20″W	Federal (11509)		
Building 29	CFB Trenton; Quinte West ON	44°07′00″N 77°32′59″W	Federal (10856)		Upload Photo
Building 49	CFB Trenton; Quinte West ON	44°06′35″N 77°31′55″W	Federal (11454)		Upload Photo
Building 56	CFB Trenton; Quinte West ON	44°06′36″N 77°31′45″W	Federal (11232, (16104)		Upload Photo
Hangar 77	CFB Trenton; Quinte West ON	44°04′12″N 77°19′59″W	Federal (10151)		Upload Photo
Hangar 78	CFB Trenton; Quinte West ON	44°04′14″N 77°19′56″W	Federal (10155)		Upload Photo
Hangar 80	CFB Trenton; Quinte West ON	44°04′18″N 77°19′49″W	Federal (10156)		Upload Photo
Hangar 81	CFB Trenton; Quinte West ON	44°04′18″N 77°19′49″W	Federal (10157)		Upload Photo
Hangar 82	CFB Trenton; Quinte West ON	44°04′10″N 77°19′54″W	Federal (10159)		Upload Photo
VIP Private Married Quarters	18 Caribou Crescent, CFB Trenton; Quinte West ON	44°06′31″N 77°31′32″W	Federal (11621)		Upload Photo
Lockmaster's House	Sidney ON	44°07′46″N 77°35′17″W	Federal (10517)		More images
Officers' Mess	CFB Trenton; Quinte West ON	44°06′55″N 77°32′21″W	Federal (11511)		
Officer's Quarters	CFB Trenton; Quinte West ON	44°06′55″N 77°32′21″W	Federal (11102)		Upload Photo
Trent–Severn Waterway National Historic Site of Canada	Trenton to Severn; Quinte West (Trenton) ON	44°23′09″N 78°27′21″W	Federal (4507)		More images
Christ Church, Her Majesty's Chapel Royal of the Mohawk National Historic Site of Canada	South Church Lane; Tyendinaga Mohawk Territory ON	44°11′07″N 77°04′26″W	Federal (13573)		More images

=== Kawartha Lakes ===
Name	Address	Coordinates	Government recognition (CRHP №)	Wikidata ID	Image
Canal Lake Concrete Arch Bridge National Historic Site of Canada	Centennial Park Road over the Trent-Severn Waterway; Kawartha Lakes ON	44°33′29″N 79°02′45″W	Federal (13085)		More images

=== District Municipality of Muskoka ===
Name	Address	Coordinates	Government recognition (CRHP №)	Wikidata ID	Image
Beausoleil Island National Historic Site of Canada	Georgian Bay; Honey Harbour ON	44°51′58″N 79°52′14″W	Federal (19642)		More images
Woodchester Villa	15 King Street; Bracebridge ON	45°02′22″N 79°18′19″W	Ontario (8206), Bracebridge municipality (8568)		More images
Bethune House	235 John Street; Gravenhurst ON	44°55′14″N 79°22′34″W	Federal (9727)		More images
Bethune Memorial House National Historic Site of Canada	235 John Street North; Gravenhurst ON	44°55′14″N 79°22′34″W	Federal (7765)		More images
Huntsville CNR Station	1 Station Road; Huntsville ON	45°19′25″N 79°13′34″W	Federal (6811), Ontario (10507)		More images
Western Islands Lighthouse	Double Top Island; District Municipality of Muskoka ON	45°02′12″N 80°21′16″W	Federal (21074)		

=== Northumberland County ===
Name	Address	Coordinates	Government recognition (CRHP №)	Wikidata ID	Image
Barnum House	Alnwick/Haldimand ON	43°59′27″N 78°02′37″W	Federal (4027), Ontario (19799)	Q4409745	More images
Former Canadian National Railways (VIA Rail) Station	201 Third Street; Cobourg ON	43°58′03″N 78°10′17″W	Federal (4617)		More images
Old Market Building	201 Third Street; Cobourg ON	43°57′34″N 78°10′04″W	Ontario (8184)		More images
Poplars	18 Spencer Street East; Cobourg ON	43°57′54″N 78°10′09″W	Ontario (8897)		
Second Street Fire Hall	213 Second Street; Cobourg ON	43°57′34″N 78°10′04″W	Ontario (10570)		More images
Victoria College	100 University Street East; Cobourg ON	43°57′55″N 78°09′53″W	Ontario (8208)		More images
Victoria Hall / Cobourg Town Hall National Historic Site of Canada	55 King Street; Cobourg ON	43°57′34″N 78°10′04″W	Federal (7550), Ontario (8201)		More images
26 Barrett Street	26 Barrett Street; Port Hope ON	43°57′15″N 78°17′43″W	Port Hope municipality (9329)		
34-46 Walton Street, Port Hope	34 Walton Street; Port Hope ON	43°57′05″N 78°17′35″W	Ontario (8836)		More images
50 John Street	50 John Street; Port Hope ON	43°57′03″N 78°17′42″W	Ontario (8266)		More images
Armstrong Cottage	239 Ridout Street; Port Hope ON	43°57′05″N 78°18′13″W	Port Hope municipality (9327)		
Bank of Upper Canada	86 John Street; Port Hope ON	43°56′59″N 78°17′43″W	Port Hope municipality (9328)		More images
Blackham's Hotel	4345 Dorset Street West; Port Hope ON	43°56′54″N 78°17′45″W	Port Hope municipality (8945)		
Bluestone House a.k.a. John David Smith House	21 Dorset Street East; Port Hope ON	43°56′59″N 78°17′23″W	Ontario (19801), Port Hope municipality (8343)		
Cassie Cottage	15 Julia Street; Port Hope ON	43°57′09″N 78°18′15″W	Port Hope municipality (8946)		
Chalk Carriage Works	46 Cavan Street; Port Hope ON	43°57′13″N 78°17′44″W	Port Hope municipality (9331)		More images
Charles Clemes Duplex	57 King Street; Port Hope ON	43°57′03″N 78°17′25″W	Port Hope municipality (9332)		More images
Charles Wickett House	55 King Street; Port Hope ON	43°57′03″N 78°17′25″W	Port Hope municipality (9993)		More images
Crawley House	28 Bedford Street; Port Hope ON	43°57′22″N 78°17′54″W	Port Hope municipality (9994)		
David Smart House	175 Dorset Street West; Port Hope ON	43°56′47″N 78°18′08″W	Port Hope municipality (7789)		
Elias Smith House	168 King Street; Port Hope ON	43°56′42″N 78°17′24″W	Port Hope municipality (9995)		More images
Fairmont: The David Smith House	172 Dorset Street; Port Hope ON	43°57′09″N 78°16′48″W	Port Hope municipality (9997)		
George Manning Furby House	61 Bramley Street North; Port Hope ON	43°57′14″N 78°18′26″W	Port Hope municipality (9998)		More images
Henry Howard Meredith House	47 Pine Street South; Port Hope ON	43°57′01″N 78°17′46″W	Port Hope municipality (10002)		
Hooey Cottage	20 Ward Street (accessed from 31A Harcourt St.); Port Hope ON	43°57′14″N 78°17′28″W	Port Hope municipality (10003)		
James Leslie Cottage	118 Bruton Street; Port Hope ON	43°57′13″N 78°18′21″W	Port Hope municipality (10004)		
James Sculthorp Townhouse	200 Walton Street; Port Hope ON	43°57′08″N 78°18′03″W	Port Hope municipality (10006)		
John, Ontario and Queen Street Heritage Conservation District	John, Ontario and Queen Street Heritage Conservation District; Port Hope ON	43°57′04″N 78°17′35″W	Port Hope municipality (10001)		Upload Photo
John Tucker Williams House: Penryn Homestead	82 Victoria Street South; Port Hope ON	43°56′46″N 78°18′21″W	Port Hope municipality (9999)		Upload Photo
Joseph Clarke House	13 King Street; Port Hope ON	43°57′12″N 78°17′25″W	Port Hope municipality (10007)		
Judson A. Brown House	82 Augusta Street; Port Hope ON	43°56′58″N 78°17′52″W	Port Hope municipality (10008)		
Little Bluestone	117 King Street; Port Hope ON	43°56′50″N 78°17′24″W	Port Hope municipality (8318)		More images
Little Station	10 Hayward Street; Port Hope ON	43°56′45″N 78°17′42″W	Port Hope municipality (10009)		More images
Margaret and Charles Stuart House	180 Dorset Street East; Port Hope ON	43°57′13″N 78°16′32″W	Port Hope municipality (15583)		
Penstowe	98 Ontario Street; Port Hope ON	43°57′22″N 78°17′34″W	Port Hope municipality (8342)		More images
Pinehurst	44 Pine Street North; Port Hope ON	43°57′15″N 78°17′56″W	Port Hope municipality (10010)		Upload Photo
Port Hope Capitol Theatre	14 Queen Street; Port Hope ON	43°57′02″N 78°17′35″W	Port Hope municipality (7788)		More images
Port Hope CNR Station	20 Hayward Street; Port Hope ON	43°56′39″N 78°17′52″W	Federal (4553), Ontario (8898)		More images
Port Hope Registry Office	17 Mill Street North; Port Hope ON	43°57′04″N 78°17′31″W	Port Hope municipality (10011)		More images
Port Hope Town Hall	56 Queen Street; Port Hope ON	43°56′57″N 78°17′35″W	Port Hope municipality (10012)		More images
Richard Trick Cottage	254 Ridout Street; Port Hope ON	43°57′05″N 78°18′15″W	Port Hope municipality (10013)		
Robert Mitchell House	8 King Street; Port Hope ON	43°57′13″N 78°17′27″W	Port Hope municipality (10014)		More images
Robert Youdan Terrace	46 Baldwin Street; Port Hope ON	43°57′12″N 78°18′05″W	Port Hope municipality (10015)		Upload Photo
St. Lawrence Hall Block	87 Walton Street; Port Hope ON	43°57′06″N 78°17′41″W	Ontario (8274)		More images
St. Mark's Anglican Church	51 King Street; Port Hope ON	43°57′05″N 78°17′25″W	Port Hope municipality (9964)		More images
Smith Cottage	72 Augusta Street; Port Hope ON	43°56′58″N 78°17′50″W	Port Hope municipality (9961)		More images
Smith House	92 King Street; Port Hope ON	43°56′56″N 78°17′25″W	Port Hope municipality (9962)		More images
Thomas B. Chalk House	48 Bloomsgrove Avenue; Port Hope ON	43°57′26″N 78°17′29″W	Port Hope municipality (9966)		More images
Thomas Clarke House: The Cone	115 Dorset Street West; Port Hope ON	43°56′50″N 78°17′58″W	Port Hope municipality (9967)		More images
Thomas McCreery House	78 Augusta Street; Port Hope ON	43°56′58″N 78°17′52″W	Port Hope municipality (9968)		More images
Thomas White House	22 Shortt Street; Port Hope ON	43°56′59″N 78°18′42″W	Port Hope municipality (9969)		Upload Photo
Turner House	73 Mill Street South; Port Hope ON	43°56′52″N 78°17′29″W	Port Hope municipality (9971)		More images
Union Cemetery Chapel	114 Toronto Road; Port Hope ON	43°57′21″N 78°19′01″W	Port Hope municipality (8317)		More images
Waddell Block	1 Waddell Street; Port Hope ON	43°57′02″N 78°17′31″W	Port Hope municipality (9973)		More images
Walton Street Heritage Conservation District, Downtown Port Hope	Walton Street, between Pine Street and Mill Street; Port Hope ON	43°57′02″N 78°17′31″W	Port Hope municipality (7792)		Upload Photo
William B. Cawthorne House	64 Augusta Street; Port Hope ON	43°56′59″N 78°17′48″W	Port Hope municipality (9974)		More images
William Bellamy Cottage	64 Charles Street; Port Hope ON	43°57′09″N 78°18′18″W	Port Hope municipality (9975)		Upload Photo
William Craig House	42 Bedford Street; Port Hope ON	43°57′22″N 78°17′58″W	Port Hope municipality (9976)		Upload Photo
William Sisson House: Wimbourne	89 Dorset Street West; Port Hope ON	43°56′52″N 78°17′52″W	Port Hope municipality (9972)		More images
William Skitch Cottage	159 Bruton Street; Port Hope ON	43°57′10″N 78°18′31″W	Port Hope municipality (9977)		Upload Photo
William Trick Cottage	9 Church Street; Port Hope ON	43°57′08″N 78°18′07″W	Port Hope municipality (9978)		Upload Photo

=== Parry Sound District ===
Name	Address	Coordinates	Government recognition (CRHP №)	Wikidata ID	Image
Pointe-au-Baril Lighthouse	The Archipelago (Pointe au Baril) ON		Federal (9821)		More images
Lighttower; Jones Island Front Range	Gordon Rock; Carling ON	45°18′54″N 80°16′50″W	Federal (21065)		Upload Photo
Lighttower; Jones Island Rear Range	West side of Jones Island; Carling ON	45°18′02″N 80°15′21″W	Federal (21066)		Upload Photo
Snug Harbour Rear Range Light Tower	southern tip of Snug Island; Carling ON	45°22′26″N 80°18′40″W	Federal (15955)		
Commanda General Store	4077 Highway 522; Nipissing (Commanda) ON	45°57′06″N 79°36′19″W	Ontario (10425)		Upload Photo
Belvedere Heights Lookout	Belvedere; Parry Sound ON	45°20′33″N 80°02′23″W	Parry Sound municipality (18530)		Upload Photo
Canadian Pacific Railway Station	1 Avenue Road; Parry Sound ON		Federal (7094)		Upload Photo
Lighttower; Byng Inlet Front Range	Parry Sound ON	45°45′08″N 80°38′41″W	Federal (21068)		Upload Photo
Rear Range Light Tower	Badgeley Island; Parry Sound ON	45°33′21″N 80°29′08″W	Federal (13216, (13059)		Upload Photo
Lighttower: Lighthouse Shoal	On a shoal in northern Lake Rousseau; Seguin ON	45°14′46″N 79°38′13″W	Federal (19681)		Upload Photo
Lighthouse and Dwelling	Gereaux Island; Unorganized Centre Parry Sound District ON	45°44′40″N 80°39′33″W	Federal (9678)		More images
Red Rock Light Tower	Red Rock Island; Unorganized Centre Parry Sound District ON	45°21′39″N 80°23′50″W	Federal (13214)		

=== Peterborough County ===
Name	Address	Coordinates	Government recognition (CRHP №)	Wikidata ID	Image
Canadian Pacific Railway Station	Ottawa Street (Hwy No. 7 at Orange St.); Havelock ON	44°26′00″N 77°52′58″W	Federal (6701)		More images
Peterborough Petroglyphs National Historic Site of Canada	Petroglyphs Provincial Park; Otonabee–South Monaghan ON	44°36′46″N 78°02′34″W	Federal (11705)		More images
Serpent Mounds National Historic Site of Canada	Roach's Point and East Sugar Island in Rice Lake; Otonabee–South Monaghan ON	44°12′57″N 78°08′34″W	Federal (14407)		
Absalom Ingram House	309 Engleburn Avenue; Peterborough ON	44°18′12″N 78°18′45″W	Peterborough municipality (2155)		More images
Auburn Mills Cottage	205 Lisburn Street; Peterborough ON	44°19′27″N 78°18′41″W	Peterborough municipality (6378)		More images
Bonner Worth Mill Administration Building	544 McDonnel Street; Peterborough ON	44°18′30″N 78°20′11″W	Peterborough municipality (4054)		More images
Burnham Mansion	760 Lansdowne Street East; Peterborough ON	44°17′46″N 78°16′39″W	Peterborough municipality (1386)		Upload Photo
Cathedral of St. Peter-in-Chains	316 Hunter Street West; Peterborough ON	44°18′20″N 78°19′39″W	Peterborough municipality (1566)		More images
Central School	90 Murray Street; Peterborough ON	44°18′31″N 78°19′04″W	Peterborough municipality (7607)		Upload Photo
Confederation Park	501 George Street North; Peterborough ON	44°18′31″N 78°19′15″W	Peterborough municipality (1664)		More images
Cox Terrace National Historic Site of Canada	332-344 Rubidge Street; Peterborough ON	44°18′13″N 78°19′35″W	Federal (1188)		More images
The Dixon-Stevenson-Bradburn Building	379 George Street North; Peterborough ON	44°18′19″N 78°19′13″W	Peterborough municipality (6388)		More images
Dumble-Hinton House	607 Stewart Street; Peterborough ON	44°18′44″N 78°19′35″W	Peterborough municipality (1558)		Upload Photo
Eastland House	273 Hunter Street West; Peterborough ON	44°18′21″N 78°19′30″W	Peterborough municipality (7609)		More images
Engleburn House	260 Engleburn Avenue; Peterborough ON	44°18′08″N 78°18′47″W	Peterborough municipality (1334)		More images
Fair-Bierk Building	383 George Street North; Peterborough ON	44°18′19″N 78°19′13″W	Peterborough municipality (1391)		More images
Former Peterborough Post Office and Customs Building	191 201 Charlotte Street; Peterborough ON	44°18′11″N 78°19′19″W	Peterborough municipality (5531)		More images
George Street United Church	534 George Street; Peterborough ON	44°18′36″N 78°19′11″W	Peterborough municipality (1564)		More images
Grover-Nicholls House	415 Rubidge Street; Peterborough ON	44°18′22″N 78°19′39″W	Peterborough municipality (1552)		More images
Hamilton Carriage House	478 Downie Street; Peterborough ON	44°18′28″N 78°19′44″W	Peterborough municipality (6389)		Upload Photo
Harstone House	565 Water Street; Peterborough ON	44°18′40″N 78°19′11″W	Peterborough municipality (1326)		More images
Hay-Smit House	155 Hunter Street East; Peterborough ON	44°18′24″N 78°18′26″W	Peterborough municipality (5549)		More images
Henry Calcutt House	73 Robinson Street; Peterborough ON	44°18′15″N 78°18′37″W	Peterborough municipality (1369)		More images
Henry Myers Cottage	538 Harvey Street; Peterborough ON	44°18′37″N 78°19′04″W	Peterborough municipality (1547)		More images
Hutchison House	270 Brock Street; Peterborough ON	44°18′26″N 78°19′31″W	Peterborough municipality (1329)		More images
James Menzies House	279 Sherbrooke Street; Peterborough ON	44°18′01″N 78°19′30″W	Peterborough municipality (3021)		More images
James Miller House	565-569 Harvey Street; Peterborough ON	44°18′40″N 78°19′06″W	Peterborough municipality (1348)		More images
James Reid House	1154 Armour Road; Peterborough ON	44°20′21″N 78°18′26″W	Peterborough municipality (1557)		Upload Photo
John Britton House	533 Harvey Street; Peterborough ON	44°18′36″N 78°19′06″W	Peterborough municipality (3020)		Upload Photo
The Lundy Building	285 George Street North; Peterborough ON	44°18′08″N 78°19′12″W	Peterborough municipality (6387)		More images
Malcolm House	488 Aylmer Street; Peterborough ON	44°18′31″N 78°19′24″W	Peterborough municipality (2145)		Upload Photo
Malone	62 Dunlop Street; Peterborough ON	44°19′13″N 78°18′45″W	Peterborough municipality (1580)		More images
Marchbanks	361 Park Street North; Peterborough ON	44°18′15″N 78°19′48″W	Peterborough municipality (1498)		More images
Market Hall and Clock Tower	360 George Street; Peterborough ON	44°18′15″N 78°19′11″W	Peterborough municipality (1345)		More images
Merino	17 Merino Road; Peterborough ON	44°18′14″N 78°21′23″W	Peterborough municipality (8436)		Upload Photo
Morrow Building	442-448 George Street North; Peterborough ON	44°18′26″N 78°19′12″W	Peterborough municipality (1546)		More images
Old Pump House	1230 Water Street; Peterborough ON	44°20′31″N 78°18′42″W	Peterborough municipality (1389)		More images
Pagoda Bridge	610 Parkhill Road West; Peterborough ON	44°18′39″N 78°20′28″W	Peterborough municipality (1645)		More images
Pappas Building	407-409 George Street North; Peterborough ON	44°18′22″N 78°19′13″W	Peterborough municipality (7793)		More images
Peck House	183 Mark Street; Peterborough ON	44°18′01″N 78°18′33″W	Peterborough municipality (1548)		More images
Peterborough CPR Station	175 George Street North; Peterborough ON	44°17′55″N 78°19′12″W	Federal (4400), Ontario (8883)		More images
Peterborough Drill Hall / Armoury	220 Murray Street; Peterborough ON	44°18′30″N 78°19′14″W	Federal (4340, (7647)		More images
Peterborough Family YMCA	475 George Street North; Peterborough ON	44°18′29″N 78°19′14″W	Peterborough municipality (1556)		More images
Peterborough Lift Lock National Historic Site of Canada	Otonabee River near Ashburnham Memorial Park; Peterborough ON	44°18′27″N 78°18′01″W	Federal (11449)		More images
The Pines	266 Burnham Street; Peterborough ON	44°18′09″N 78°18′41″W	Peterborough municipality (1394)		More images
Pioneer Park	51 Hilliard Street; Peterborough ON	44°19′19″N 78°19′05″W	Peterborough municipality (1587)		More images
Robert Graham House	547 Water Street; Peterborough ON	44°18′38″N 78°19′10″W	Peterborough municipality (1371)		More images
Sadleir House	751 George Street North; Peterborough ON	44°18′42″N 78°05′41″W	Peterborough municipality (6377)		More images
St. John the Evangelist Anglican Church	118 Hunter Street; Peterborough ON	44°18′24″N 78°19′05″W	Ontario (10580), Peterborough municipality (1346)		More images
St. Peter's Bishop's Palace	350 Hunter Street West; Peterborough ON	44°18′21″N 78°19′43″W	Peterborough municipality (1579)		More images
St. Peter's Cathedral Centre	317 Hunter Street West; Peterborough ON	44°18′20″N 78°19′39″W	Peterborough municipality (1559)		More images
St. Peter's Rectory	411 Reid Street; Peterborough ON	44°18′21″N 78°19′42″W	Peterborough municipality (1581)		More images
Smithtown Hill House	269 Edinburgh Street; Peterborough ON	44°18′46″N 78°19′31″W	Peterborough municipality (1565)		More images
Sutton-Deyman House	82 Dublin Street; Peterborough ON	44°18′45″N 78°19′03″W	Peterborough municipality (1554)		More images
Verulam	236 Burnham Street; Peterborough ON	44°18′05″N 78°18′41″W	Peterborough municipality (1555)		More images
Weller-Boucher House	548 Weller Street; Peterborough ON	44°18′19″N 78°20′08″W	Peterborough municipality (1620)		More images
William Blackwell House	84 Benson Avenue; Peterborough ON	44°19′04″N 78°19′22″W	Peterborough municipality (1573)		Upload Photo
William Dixon House	661 Park Street North; Peterborough ON	44°18′47″N 78°20′07″W	Peterborough municipality (1396)		More images
The Yelland Building	464 George Street North; Peterborough ON	44°18′27″N 78°19′12″W	Peterborough municipality (5545)		More images

=== Prince Edward County ===
Name	Address	Coordinates	Government recognition (CRHP №)	Wikidata ID	Image
Carrying Place of the Bay of Quinte National Historic Site of Canada	Intersection of the Trenton and Carrying Place Roads; Prince Edward (Carrying Place) ON	44°02′55″N 77°34′57″W	Federal (13814)		
Lighthouse	Main Duck Island; Prince Edward ON	43°55′52″N 76°38′18″W	Federal (4747)		Upload Photo
Scotch Bonnet Island Lighthouse	Egg Island aka Scotch Bonnet Island; Prince Edward ON	43°53′57″N 77°32′32″W	Federal (20774)		Upload Photo
False Duck Island Lighttower	False Duck Island aka Swetman Island; Prince Edward ON	43°56′52″N 76°47′55″W	Federal (21073)		Upload Photo

=== Simcoe County ===
Name	Address	Coordinates	Government recognition (CRHP №)	Wikidata ID	Image
Canadian National Railways Allandale Station at Barrie	285 Bradford Street; Barrie ON	44°22′26″N 79°41′17″W	Federal (6503), Ontario (8884)		More images
Barrie Public Library	37 Mulcaster Street; Barrie ON	44°23′24″N 79°41′07″W	Barrie municipality (1370)		More images
Master Mechanic's Building	205 Lakeshore Drive; Barrie ON	44°22′26″N 79°40′49″W	Barrie municipality (1331)		More images
Mulcaster Street Armoury	36 Mulcaster Street; Barrie ON	44°23′24″N 79°41′08″W	Barrie municipality (1332)		More images
Fort Sainte Marie II National Historic Site of Canada	southern shore of Christian Island; Christian Island 30A ON	44°49′26″N 80°09′51″W	Federal (16002)		
Tower	Northern tip of Hope Island; Christian Island ON	44°49′26″N 80°09′51″W	Federal (9658)		Upload Photo
Claverleigh National Historic Site of Canada	3.2 km west of Creemore; Clearview ON	44°19′00″N 80°06′00″W	Federal (7597)		More images
Collingwood Heritage Conservation District	the historic town core of Collingwood; Collingwood ON	44°29′31″N 80°12′22″W	Collingwood municipality (1325)		More images
Federal Building	44 Hurontario Street; Collingwood ON	44°30′05″N 80°13′02″W	Federal (3405)		More images
Lighttower	Nottawasaga Island; Collingwood ON	44°32′19″N 80°15′34″W	Federal (3405)		Upload Photo
Barrie Armoury	Park Street; Essa ON	44°23′26″N 79°41′17″W	Federal (9580)		More images
Building A-74 (Maple Mess)	51 Maple Leaf Drive, CFB Borden; Essa ON	44°16′04″N 79°54′24″W	Federal (9556)		More images
Building A-78	CFB Borden; Essa ON	44°15′57″N 79°54′15″W	Federal (10523)		More images
Building E-108	18 Waterloo Road, CFB Borden; Essa ON	44°17′11″N 79°53′23″W	Federal (11497)		More images
Building O-102	CFB Borden; Essa ON	44°16′46″N 79°53′32″W	Federal (10880)		More images
Building O-109 (NCO Building)	CFB Borden; Essa ON	44°10′23″N 79°32′02″W	Federal (9600)		Upload Photo
Building P-148 (School)	CFB Borden; Essa ON	44°10′15″N 79°31′33″W	Federal (9589)		More images
Building S-136	CFB Borden; Essa ON	44°17′32″N 79°53′51″W	Federal (10879)		More images
Croil Hall (Building A142)	CFB Borden; Essa ON	44°16′26″N 79°53′28″W	Federal (9477)		More images
Hangar 3 at Hangar Line	Hangar Road, CFB Borden; Essa ON	44°16′05″N 79°54′48″W	Federal (16485)		Upload Photo
Hangar 5 at Hangar Line	Hangar Road, CFB Borden; Essa ON	44°16′10″N 79°56′25″W	Federal (16486)		Upload Photo
Hangar 6 at Hangar Line	Hangar Road, CFB Borden; Essa ON	44°16′26″N 79°53′28″W	Federal (16483)		Upload Photo
Hangar 7 at Hangar Line	Hangar Road, CFB Borden; Essa ON	44°16′05″N 79°54′48″W	Federal (16487)		More images
Hangar 10 at Hangar Line	Hangar Road, CFB Borden; Essa ON	44°16′26″N 79°53′28″W	Federal (16488)		Upload Photo
Hangar 11 at Hangar Line	Hangar Road, CFB Borden; Essa ON	44°16′05″N 79°54′48″W	Federal (16489)		More images
Hangar 12 at Hangar Line	Hangar Road, CFB Borden; Essa ON	44°16′26″N 79°53′28″W	Federal (16484)		Upload Photo
Hangar 13 at Hangar Line	Hangar Road, CFB Borden; Essa ON	44°16′26″N 79°53′28″W	Federal (16490)		Upload Photo
Junior Ranks Quarters (Building T-114)	CFB Borden; Essa ON	44°16′47″N 79°54′02″W	Federal (10147)		Upload Photo
Junior Ranks Quarters (Building T-115)	CFB Borden; Essa ON	44°16′52″N 79°53′59″W	Federal (10148)		Upload Photo
Royal Flying Corps Hangars National Historic Site of Canada	CFB Borden; Essa ON	44°16′00″N 79°53′00″W	Federal (7839)		Upload Photo
Sainte-Marie Among the Hurons Mission National Historic Site of Canada	Highway 12; Midland ON	44°44′02″N 79°50′25″W	Federal (12088)		More images
Canadian National Railway Station	170 Front Street S Orillia ON	44°36′23″N 79°24′39″W	Federal (6908)		More images
Gribbin (McMaster) Building	45 Mississaga Street East; Orillia ON	44°36′31″N 79°25′07″W	Orillia municipality (1323)		Upload Photo
Kean's Block	19-27 Mississaga Street East; Orillia ON	44°36′31″N 79°25′08″W	Orillia municipality (1324)		More images
Stephen Leacock Museum / Old Brewery Bay National Historic Site of Canada	50 Museum Drive; Orillia ON	44°36′30″N 79°23′38″W	Federal (14362), Ontario (10582)		More images
Oro African Methodist Episcopal Church National Historic Site of Canada	intersection of the Oro Sideroads 10 and 11; Oro-Medonte ON	44°30′10″N 79°38′11″W	Federal (12100)		More images
Ossossane Sites National Historic Site	Two sites on the shore of Nottawasaga Bay; Ossossane Beach ON		Federal (19551)		Upload Photo
St. James-on-the-Lines Anglican Church	215 Church Street; Penetanguishene ON	44°47′14″N 79°55′34″W	Ontario (10578)		More images
Trent–Severn Waterway National Historic Site of Canada	Trenton to Port Severn; Port Severn ON	44°23′08″N 78°27′21″W	Federal (4507)		More images
Mnjikaning Fish Weirs National Historic Site of Canada	bottom of the Narrows between Lakes Simcoe and Couchiching; Ramara ON	44°36′15″N 79°22′11″W	Federal (9679)		More images
Strawberry Island Combined Lighthouse and Dwelling	Strawberry Island; Ramara ON	45°58′25″N 81°51′15″W	Federal (12914)		Upload Photo
Glengarry Landing National Historic Site of Canada	Highway 26; Springwater ON	44°27′03″N 79°54′04″W	Federal (15768)		More images
Mission of St. Ignace II National Historic Site of Canada	the west half of Lot 6, Concession 9 Tay ON	44°43′24″N 79°43′06″W	Federal (14461)		More images
Saint-Louis Mission National Historic Site of Canada	a tableland beside the Hogg River, 3 km inland from Georgian Bay, near Victoria Harbour; Tay ON	44°43′43″N 79°46′54″W	Federal (14403)		
Brebeuf Island Front Range Light Tower	Brebeuf Island; Tiny ON	44°53′38″N 80°00′45″W	Federal (16761)		Upload Photo

== See also ==
- List of historic places in Ontario
- List of National Historic Sites of Canada in Ontario
