= List of historic places in Wellington County, Ontario =

This is a list of historic places in Wellington County, Ontario, containing heritage sites listed on the Canadian Register of Historic Places (CRHP), all of which are designated as historic places either locally, provincially, territorially, nationally, or by more than one level of government.

== List of historic places ==
Name	Address	Coordinates	Government recognition (CRHP №)	Wikidata ID	Image
30 Moir Street	30 Moir Street; Centre Wellington ON	43°41′06″N 80°25′52″W	Centre Wellington municipality (10683)		Upload Photo
40 McNab Street West	40 McNab Street West; Centre Wellington ON	43°40′45″N 80°25′36″W	Centre Wellington municipality (10687)		Upload Photo
107 James Street	107 James Street; Centre Wellington ON	43°40′56″N 80°25′57″W	Centre Wellington municipality (9552)		Upload Photo
198 St. Andrew Street West	198 St. Andrew Street West; Centre Wellington ON	43°42′18″N 80°22′43″W	Centre Wellington municipality (10019)		
240 Union Street West	240 Union Street West; Centre Wellington ON	43°42′08″N 80°22′35″W	Centre Wellington municipality (10675)		Upload Photo
292 South River Road	292 South River Road; Centre Wellington ON	43°41′23″N 80°24′23″W	Centre Wellington municipality (10676)		Upload Photo
396 St. Andrew Street East	396 St. Andrew Street East; Centre Wellington ON	43°42′34″N 80°22′24″W	Centre Wellington municipality (10686)		Upload Photo
425 Provost Lane	425 Provost Lane; Centre Wellington ON	43°42′22″N 80°22′56″W	Centre Wellington municipality (10677)		Upload Photo
445 Provost Lane	445 Provost Lane; Centre Wellington ON	43°42′22″N 80°22′57″W	Centre Wellington municipality (10680)		Upload Photo
7003 Highway 6	7003 Highway 6 Centre Wellington ON	43°49′10″N 80°22′58″W	Centre Wellington municipality (10688)		Upload Photo
7053 First Line	7053 First Line; Centre Wellington ON	43°46′23″N 80°26′07″W	Centre Wellington municipality (10689)		Upload Photo
Armoury Hall	23 High Street; Centre Wellington ON	43°39′38″N 80°27′37″W	Centre Wellington municipality (10765)		Upload Photo
The Beatty Pool	190 St. David Street South; Centre Wellington ON	43°42′19″N 80°22′34″W	Centre Wellington municipality (9745)		More images
Belleside	230 Hillside Drive; Centre Wellington ON	43°42′28″N 80°22′18″W	Centre Wellington municipality (10787)		Upload Photo
Brock Avenue Heritage Conservation District	Brock Avenue; Centre Wellington ON	43°42′06″N 80°23′05″W	Centre Wellington municipality (9765)		Upload Photo
Chalmers Manse	14 Henderson Street; Centre Wellington ON	43°40′57″N 80°25′59″W	Centre Wellington municipality (9886)		Upload Photo
Commercial Hotel	23-43 West Mill Street; Centre Wellington ON	43°40′52″N 80°25′50″W	Centre Wellington municipality (10262)		Upload Photo
Elora Junior School	75 Melville Street; Centre Wellington ON	43°40′58″N 80°25′35″W	Centre Wellington municipality (11031)		Upload Photo
Elora Post Office	128 Geddes Street; Centre Wellington ON	43°41′01″N 80°25′51″W	Centre Wellington municipality (10978)		
Ennotville Library	7722 Sixth Line; Centre Wellington ON	43°39′38″N 80°27′37″W	Centre Wellington municipality (11183)		Upload Photo
Fergus District High School	680 Tower Street South; Centre Wellington ON	43°41′58″N 80°22′20″W	Centre Wellington municipality (10953)		More images
Fergus Public Library	190 St. Andrew Street West; Centre Wellington ON	43°42′18″N 80°22′43″W	Centre Wellington municipality (11194)		Upload Photo
Former Elora Drill Shed National Historic Site of Canada	40 High Street; Centre Wellington ON	43°40′48″N 80°25′44″W	Federal (11748)		More images
Groves Mill	140 St. David Street South; Centre Wellington ON	43°42′16″N 80°22′28″W	Centre Wellington municipality (15229)		More images
Mansfield Cottage	200 Smith Street; Centre Wellington ON	43°41′02″N 80°25′58″W	Centre Wellington municipality (11752)		Upload Photo
Market Scales Building	150 Provost Lane; Centre Wellington ON	43°42′16″N 80°23′05″W	Centre Wellington municipality (11753)		
The Old McLean House	17 Henderson Street; Centre Wellington ON	43°40′58″N 80°25′58″W	Centre Wellington municipality (13242)		Upload Photo
Richard Moore House	259 St. Andrew Street East; Centre Wellington ON	43°42′27″N 80°22′33″W	Centre Wellington municipality (12433)		Upload Photo
St. John's Church	36 Henderson Street; Centre Wellington ON	43°41′00″N 80°25′54″W	Centre Wellington municipality (11871)		More images
Wellington County House of Industry and Refuge National Historic Site of Canada	536 County Road 18; Centre Wellingtin (Fergus) ON	43°41′34″N 80°23′54″W	Federal (7691)		More images
7 Waterloo Avenue	7 Waterloo Avenue; Guelph ON	43°32′28″N 80°15′01″W	Guelph municipality (5509)		Upload Photo
8 Glenhill Place	8 Glenhill Place; Guelph ON	43°33′23″N 80°15′03″W	Guelph municipality (14545)		Upload Photo
22-26 Oxford Street, Guelph	22 Oxford Street; Guelph ON	43°32′N 80°15′W	Guelph municipality (2979)		Upload Photo
24 Cambridge Street	24 Cambridge Street; Guelph ON	43°32′36″N 80°15′18″W	Guelph municipality (10674)		Upload Photo
32 Liverpool Street	32 Liverpool Street; Guelph ON	43°32′46″N 80°15′19″W	Guelph municipality (14551)		Upload Photo
49 Albert Street	49 Albert Street; Guelph ON	43°32′13″N 80°14′34″W	Guelph municipality (10681)		Upload Photo
74-76 Liverpool Street	74 Liverpool Street; Guelph ON	43°32′44″N 80°15′23″W	Guelph municipality (14553)		
83 King Street	83 King Street; Guelph ON	43°33′04″N 80°15′00″W	Guelph municipality (14546)		
87 Liverpool Street	87 Liverpool Street; Guelph ON	43°32′42″N 80°15′27″W	Guelph municipality (14554)		Upload Photo
93-95 Nottingham Street	93 Nottingham Street; Guelph ON	43°32′20″N 80°14′57″W	Guelph municipality (13884)		Upload Photo
109 Surrey Street East	109 Surrey Street East; Guelph ON	43°32′41″N 80°14′39″W	Guelph municipality (14550)		Upload Photo
146 Waterloo Avenue	146 Waterloo Avenue; Guelph ON	43°32′14″N 80°15′15″W	Guelph municipality (14543)		Upload Photo
204 College Avenue West	204 College Avenue West; Guelph ON	43°31′25″N 80°14′39″W	Guelph municipality (14544)		Upload Photo
221 Woolwich Street	221 Woolwich Street; Guelph ON	43°32′55″N 80°15′17″W	Guelph municipality (10673)		Upload Photo
268-270 Woolwich Street	268 Woolwich Street; Guelph ON	43°32′58″N 80°15′23″W	Guelph municipality (10764)		
341 Forestell Road	341 Forestell Road; Guelph ON	43°28′48″N 80°13′02″W	Guelph municipality (13847)		Upload Photo
1453 Gordon Street	1453 Gordon Street; Guelph ON	43°30′36″N 80°11′46″W	Guelph municipality (14849)		Upload Photo
Alumni Centre	Arboretum Road, University of Guelph; Guelph ON	43°32′08″N 80°13′14″W	Guelph municipality (10776)		Upload Photo
Armoury	Farquahar Street; Guelph ON	43°32′35″N 80°14′48″W	Federal (4345)		Upload Photo
Bell-Carlton House	40 Albert Street; Guelph ON	43°32′14″N 80°14′31″W	Guelph municipality (10784)		Upload Photo
The Bell House	21 Oxford Street; Guelph ON	43°32′45″N 80°15′14″W	Guelph municipality (13253)		More images
Bell O'Donnell House	96 Water Street; Guelph ON	43°32′11″N 80°14′39″W	Guelph municipality (10786)		Upload Photo
Blacksmith Fountain	59 Carden Street; Guelph ON	43°32′38″N 80°14′53″W	Guelph municipality (13845)		More images
The Boat House	116 Gordon Street; Guelph ON	43°32′23″N 80°14′35″W	Guelph municipality (13222)		More images
County Jail and Governor's Residence	74 Woolwich Street; Guelph ON	43°32′51″N 80°14′55″W	Guelph municipality (10906)		Upload Photo
County of Wellington Building	131 Wyndham Street North; Guelph ON	43°32′48″N 80°15′00″W	Guelph municipality (10907)		
County Solicitor's Building	15 Douglas Street; Guelph ON	43°32′48″N 80°14′55″W	Guelph municipality (10908)		
Duncan-McPhee Store	1 Quebec Street; Guelph ON	43°32′43″N 80°15′06″W	Guelph municipality (11749)		Upload Photo
Ferndell House	25 Mitchell Street; Guelph ON	43°33′03″N 80°15′04″W	Guelph municipality (13885)		
Former Canadian National Railways (VIA Rail/GO Transit) Station	79 Carden Street; Guelph ON	43°32′40″N 80°14′50″W	Federal (4569)		Upload Photo
Goldie Mill	70 Norwich Street; Guelph ON	43°33′03″N 80°15′14″W	Guelph municipality (10867)		
Gow's Bridge	McCrae Boulevard; Guelph ON	43°32′38″N 80°14′46″W	Guelph municipality (5518)		More images
Guelph City Hall National Historic Site of Canada	59 Carden Street; Guelph ON	43°32′39″N 80°14′53″W	Federal (7446), Ontario (8171), Guelph municipality (10090)		More images
Guelph Civic Museum	6 Dublin Street South; Guelph ON	43°32′27″N 80°15′01″W	Guelph municipality (10097)		More images
Guelph Waterworks Engine House and Pumping Station	29 Waterworks Place; Guelph ON	43°32′45″N 80°13′50″W	Guelph municipality (13849)		Upload Photo
H and R Block Building	133 Wyndham Street North; Guelph ON	43°32′49″N 80°15′00″W	Guelph municipality (14142)		
Heffernan Street Footbridge	Heffernan Street; Guelph ON	43°32′54″N 80°14′50″W	Guelph municipality (13903)		Upload Photo
I.O.D.E. Fountain	Guelph ON	43°32′43″N 80°15′08″W	Guelph municipality (13850)		Upload Photo
Idylwyld	27 Barber Avenue; Guelph ON	43°32′50″N 80°15′51″W	Guelph municipality (8071)		Upload Photo
Massey Hall, University of Guelph	50 Stone Road East; Guelph ON	43°31′54″N 80°13′43″W	Guelph municipality (11822)		
Maxwelton	646 Paisley Road; Guelph ON	43°31′52″N 80°16′33″W	Guelph municipality (13904)		Upload Photo
McCrae House National Historic Site of Canada	108 Water Street; Guelph ON	43°32′10″N 80°14′42″W	Federal (7673), Guelph municipality (9894)		
McLean House	21 Nottingham Street; Guelph ON	43°32′29″N 80°14′53″W	Guelph municipality (13905)		Upload Photo
Medical Hall	12 Wyndham Street North; Guelph ON	43°32′42″N 80°14′54″W	Guelph municipality (11825)		Upload Photo
Mill Lofts	26 Ontario Street; Guelph ON	43°32′40″N 80°14′22″W	Guelph municipality (11827)		More images
Norwich Street Bridge	Norwich Street; Guelph ON	43°33′01″N 80°15′09″W	Guelph municipality (13906)		Upload Photo
Our Lady of the Immaculate Conception National Historic Site of Canada	28 Norfolk Street; Guelph ON	43°32′37″N 80°15′03″W	Federal (7646)		More images
Pagani House	13 Evergreen Drive; Guelph ON	43°31′35″N 80°13′15″W	Guelph municipality (13853)		Upload Photo
Parkview	88 London Road West; Guelph ON	43°32′53″N 80°15′35″W	Guelph municipality (10930)		Upload Photo
Perry-Scroggie House	15 Oxford Street; Guelph ON	43°32′46″N 80°15′14″W	Guelph municipality (11882)		Upload Photo
The Petrie Building	15 Wyndham Street; Guelph ON	43°32′42″N 80°14′53″W	Guelph municipality (9897)		
Phoenix Mill	358 Waterloo Street; Guelph ON	43°31′55″N 80°15′36″W	Guelph municipality (12077)		Upload Photo
President's House	100 College Avenue East, University of Guelph; Guelph ON	43°31′41″N 80°13′24″W	Guelph municipality (11890)		Upload Photo
Provincial Winter Fair Building	1 Carden Street; Guelph ON	43°32′37″N 80°14′57″W	Guelph municipality (11892)		Upload Photo
St. James the Apostle Anglican Church	86 Glasgow; Guelph ON	43°32′36″N 80°15′23″W	Guelph municipality (12847)		Upload Photo
The Schoolhouse	611 Silvercreek Parkway North; Guelph ON	43°33′15″N 80°18′00″W	Guelph municipality (13855)		Upload Photo
Speed River Bicycle Shop	135 Wyndham Street; Guelph ON	43°32′49″N 80°15′00″W	Guelph municipality (13241)		
Stone Road Bridge	Stone Road; Guelph ON	43°32′50″N 80°11′50″W	Guelph municipality (13192)		
Stone Store	32 Gordon Street; Guelph ON	43°32′11″N 80°14′19″W	Guelph municipality (13221)		Upload Photo
Sunnyside	16 Arthur Street North; Guelph ON	43°32′54″N 80°14′37″W	Guelph municipality (9663)		Upload Photo
Sunset	74 Paisley Road; Guelph ON	43°32′38″N 80°15′20″W	Guelph municipality (11869)		Upload Photo
Torrance Public School	151 Waterloo Avenue; Guelph ON	43°32′14″N 80°15′16″W	Guelph municipality (13856)		Upload Photo
Wellington Hotel	147 Wyndham Street North; Guelph ON	43°32′51″N 80°15′03″W	Ontario (8205)		Upload Photo
Wood Cottage	280 Palmer Street; Guelph ON	43°33′22″N 80°14′23″W	Guelph municipality (10656)		Upload Photo
Rockwood Academy	477 Main Street South; Guelph/Eramosa (Rockwood) ON	43°36′40″N 80°08′02″W	Ontario (10546)		Upload Photo

== See also ==
- List of historic places in Southwestern Ontario
- List of historic places in Ontario
- List of National Historic Sites of Canada in Ontario
