= List of historic places in County of Brant =

This is a list of historic places in County of Brant, Ontario, containing heritage sites listed on the Canadian Register of Historic Places (CRHP), all of which are designated as historic places either locally, provincially, territorially, nationally, or by more than one level of government.

== List of historic places ==
Name	Address	Coordinates	Government recognition (CRHP №)	Wikidata ID	Image
Sunnyside	13 Main Street South; Brant ON	43°14′43″N 80°15′12″W	Brant municipality (9660)	Q111309939	More images
Adelaide Hunter Hoodless Homestead National Historic Site of Canada	359 Blue Lake Road; Brant (St. George) ON	43°14′50″N 80°15′10″W	Federal (4115), Brant (St. George) municipality (9723)		More images
Arlington Hotel (Paris, Ontario)	106 Grand River Street; Brant ON	43°11′39″N 80°23′05″W	Ontario (9984)		More images
Asa Wolverton House	52 Grand River Street; Brant ON	43°11′27″N 80°22′42″W	Brant municipality (9985)	Q111309941	More images
Brant Bowstring Bridge	Colborne Street; Brant ON	43°08′18″N 80°16′08″W	Brant municipality (9927)	Q111309960	Upload Photo
Bryning Manse	676 Mount Pleasant Road; Brant ON	43°04′50″N 80°18′45″W	Brant municipality (9986)	Q111309952	Upload Photo
Farrington House	306 Highway 53; Brant ON	43°06′31″N 80°33′04″W	Brant municipality (9987)	Q111309946	Upload Photo
Gouinlock House	42 Broadway Street; Brant ON	43°11′50″N 80°23′10″W	Brant municipality (9988)	Q111309936	More images
Hamilton Place	165 Grand River Street; Brant ON	43°11′46″N 80°23′06″W	Brant municipality (10113)		
Hiram Capron House	8 Homestead Road; Brant ON	43°12′03″N 80°23′03″W	Brant municipality (9888)	Q111309942	More images
Kelly Farm	289 Pinehurst Road; Brant ON	43°14′09″N 80°23′41″W	Brant municipality (10114)	Q111309959	More images
King's Ward Park	Broadway Street East; Brant ON	43°11′47″N 80°23′10″W	Brant municipality (10126)		Upload Photo
Lewis Cope House	380 Branchton Road; Brant ON	43°16′51″N 80°14′51″W	Brant municipality (10127)		Upload Photo
Mount Pleasant Cemetery	703 Mount Pleasant Road; County of Brant (Mount Pleasant) ON	43°04′38″N 80°18′49″W	County of Brant (Mount Pleasant) municipality (10128)		Upload Photo
O'Neail Residence	899 Keg Lane; Brant ON	43°12′10″N 80°24′30″W	Brant municipality (10129)	Q111309944	Upload Photo
Reverend Thomas Henderson House	22 Church Street; Brant ON	43°11′25″N 80°22′52″W	Brant municipality (10130)	Q111309934	Upload Photo
The School House	283 McPherson School Road; Brant ON	43°14′45″N 80°19′53″W	Brant municipality (15478)		Upload Photo
6 Henrietta Street	6 Henrietta Street; Brantford ON	43°08′45″N 80°16′30″W	Brantford municipality (15693)		
12 Ada Avenue	12 Ada Avenue; Brantford ON	43°08′55″N 80°16′42″W	Brantford municipality (15689)		
48 Albion Street	48 Albion Street; Brantford ON	43°08′35″N 80°16′12″W	Brantford municipality (15692)		
87 Sheridan Street	87 Sheridan Street; Brantford ON	43°08′39″N 80°15′36″W	Brantford municipality (15860)		
89 Charlotte Street	89 Charlotte Street; Brantford ON	43°08′37″N 80°15′40″W	Brantford municipality (9068)		More images
91 North Park Street	91 North Park Street; Brantford ON	43°09′30″N 80°16′09″W	Brantford municipality (15696)		
108-112 George Street	108 George Street; Brantford ON	43°08′35″N 80°15′46″W	Brantford municipality (9637)		More images
125 Grand River Avenue	125 Grand River Avenue; Brantford ON	43°08′20″N 80°16′17″W	Brantford municipality (15858)		Upload Photo
171 Wellington Street	171 Wellington Street; Brantford ON	43°08′30″N 80°15′25″W	Brantford municipality (15848)		
176 Wellington Street	176 Wellington Street; Brantford ON	43°08′30″N 80°15′23″W	Brantford municipality (15683)		
Armoury	18 Brant Avenue; Brantford ON	43°08′20″N 80°16′09″W	Federal (9732)		More images
Bell Homestead National Historic Site of Canada	94 Tutela Heights Road; Brantford ON	43°06′30″N 80°16′15″W	Federal (12773)		More images
Bell Monument	41 West Street; Brantford ON	43°08′28″N 80°16′07″W	Brantford municipality (10785)		More images
Brant Avenue Heritage Conservation District	Brant Avenue; Brantford ON	43°08′22″N 80°16′11″W	Brantford municipality (9746)		
Brant County War Memorial	6 Dalhousie Street; Brantford ON	43°08′24″N 80°14′38″W	Brantford municipality (10020)		
Brantford Waterworks Building	324 Grand River Avenue; Brantford ON	43°08′25″N 80°17′44″W	Brantford municipality (10021)		Upload Photo
Brethour House	88 Brant Avenue; Brantford ON	43°08′30″N 80°16′19″W	Brantford municipality (10022)		More images
Canadian National Railways Station	5 Wadsworth Street; Brantford ON	43°08′47″N 80°15′57″W	Federal (4515)		More images
Carnegie Library, Brantford	73 George Street; Brantford ON	43°08′27″N 80°15′45″W	Brantford municipality (9885)		More images
Cockshutt Plow Company	66 Mohawk Street; Brantford ON	43°07′47″N 80°14′58″W	Brantford municipality (15694)		Upload Photo
The Crystal Cottage	35 Chatham Street; Brantford ON	43°08′34″N 80°15′54″W	Brantford municipality (15812)		
Downs House	36 William Street; Brantford ON	43°08′30″N 80°16′13″W	Brantford municipality (15862)		
Federal Building	60 Dalhousie Street; Brantford ON	43°08′21″N 80°15′56″W	Federal (4155)		More images
Fred Chalcraft Residence	48 Palmerston Avenue; Brantford ON	43°08′52″N 80°16′44″W	Brantford municipality (15864)		
Freeman B. Shaver Residence	7 Maple Avenue; Brantford ON	43°08′49″N 80°16′40″W	Brantford municipality (15850)		
G. Gordon Caudwell House	94 Lorne Crescent; Brantford ON	43°08′42″N 80°16′30″W	Brantford municipality (15851)		
Glenhyrst	20 Ava Road; Brantford ON	43°09′26″N 80°17′14″W	Brantford municipality (10024)		Upload Photo
Greenwood Cemetery	Clarence Street; Brantford ON	43°08′53″N 80°15′38″W	Brantford municipality (10025)		Upload Photo
Her Majesty's / St. Paul's Chapel of the Mohawks National Historic Site of Canada	301 Mohawk Street; Brantford ON	43°08′00″N 80°15′45″W	Federal (11630)		More images
Hughes House	41 Lorne Crescent; Brantford ON	43°08′38″N 80°16′34″W	Brantford municipality (15885)		Upload Photo
J. R. Thompson Residence	111 Dufferin Avenue; Brantford ON	43°08′47″N 80°16′49″W	Brantford municipality (15811)		
James L. Sutherland Residence	50 Dufferin Avenue; Brantford ON	43°08′43″N 80°16′36″W	Brantford municipality (10026)		More images
Jarvis House	24 Lorne Crescent; Brantford ON	43°08′37″N 80°16′30″W	Brantford municipality (15691)		Upload Photo
John Maxwell Residence	81 Albion; Brantford ON	43°08′40″N 80°16′17″W	Brantford municipality (15698)		
Jubilee Terrace Park	10 Brant Avenue; Brantford ON	43°06′24″N 80°24′27″W	Brantford municipality (10042)		
Lawyer's Hall	76 Colborne Street; Brantford ON	43°08′18″N 80°16′01″W	Brantford municipality (10045)		More images
Masonic Temple Building	76 Dalhousie Street; Brantford ON	43°08′22″N 80°15′54″W	Brantford municipality (10043)		More images
Messiah Church	35 Wellington Street; Brantford ON	43°08′28″N 80°15′57″W	Brantford municipality (15852)		
Montessori House of Children	85 Charlotte; Brantford ON	43°08′36″N 80°15′40″W	Brantford municipality (15752)		
The Muir House	30 Lorne Crescent; Brantford ON	43°08′38″N 80°16′34″W	Brantford municipality (15856)		
Myrtleville House	34 Myrtleville Drive; Brantford ON	43°10′26″N 80°17′50″W	Brantford municipality (10044)		Upload Photo
Robert E. Ryerson Residence	18 Ada Avenue; Brantford ON	43°08′56″N 80°16′43″W	Brantford municipality (15853)		Upload Photo
S.R. Drake Memorial Church	165 Murray Street; Brantford ON	43°08′25″N 80°15′08″W	Brantford municipality (10046)		More images
St. Jude's Anglican Church National Historic Site of Canada	81 Peel Street; Brantford ON	43°08′24″N 80°15′12″W	Federal (12563)		More images
Sanderson Centre	88 Dalhousie Street; Brantford ON	43°08′22″N 80°15′53″W	Brantford municipality (10047)		More images
Scott House	7 Egerton Street; Brantford ON	43°08′42″N 80°16′33″W	Brantford municipality (10050)	Q112037209	Upload Photo
Shanahan House	98 William Street; Brantford ON	43°08′41″N 80°16′22″W	Brantford municipality (15865)		
Thorpe Brothers Funeral Home	96 West Street; Brantford ON	43°08′36″N 80°16′02″W	Brantford municipality (10051)		More images
Victoria Park Square	65 Market Street; Brantford ON	43°08′06″N 80°15′47″W	Brantford municipality (10052)		More images
Victoria Park Square Heritage Conservation District	Downtown; Brantford ON	43°08′05″N 80°15′47″W	Brantford municipality (9899)		
Walter R. Turnbull Residence	38 Dufferin Avenue; Brantford ON	43°08′42″N 80°16′34″W	Brantford municipality (15845)		
Chiefswood National Historic Site of Canada	1037 Highway 54; Six Nations of the Grand River ON	43°06′04″N 80°05′40″W	Federal (7407), Six Nations of the Grand River municipality (8297)		More images

== See also ==
- List of historic places in Ontario
- List of National Historic Sites of Canada in Ontario
