= List of historic places in Middlesex County, Ontario =

This is a list of historic places in Middlesex County, Ontario, containing heritage sites listed on the Canadian Register of Historic Places (CRHP), all of which are designated as historic places either locally, provincially, territorially, nationally, or by more than one level of government.

== List of historic places ==
Name	Address	Coordinates	Government recognition (CRHP №)	Wikidata ID	Image
37 Ridout Street South	37 Ridout Street South; London ON	42°58′32″N 81°15′02″W	London municipality (14087)		More images
49 Ridout Street South	49 Ridout Street South; London ON	42°58′29″N 81°15′00″W	London municipality (14883)		More images
64 Elmwood Avenue East	64 Elmwood Avenue East; London ON	42°58′14″N 81°15′29″W	London municipality (14284)		
85 Albion Street	85 Albion Street; London ON	42°59′19″N 81°15′42″W	London municipality (14365)		
165 Oxford Street East	165 Oxford Street East; London ON	42°59′42″N 81°15′18″W	London municipality (14046)		
260 Sydenham Street	260 Sydenham Street; London ON	42°59′50″N 81°15′06″W	London municipality (14086)		More images
308 Princess Avenue	308 Princess Avenue; London ON	42°59′22″N 81°14′42″W	London municipality (14864)		
350 Talbot Street	350 Talbot Street; London ON	42°58′53″N 81°15′03″W	London municipality (14865)		
379 Wortley Road	379 Wortley Road; London ON	42°57′46″N 81°14′51″W	London municipality (14871)		
398 Piccadilly Street	398 Piccadilly Street; London ON	42°59′48″N 81°14′42″W	London municipality (14872)		More images
437 Victoria Street	437 Victoria Street; London ON	43°00′23″N 81°14′52″W	London municipality (14089)		
496 Waterloo Street	496 Waterloo Street; London ON	42°59′23″N 81°14′40″W	London municipality (14090)		
501-503 Colborne Street	501 Colborne Street; London ON	42°59′18″N 81°14′28″W	London municipality (14884)		
527 Princess Avenue	527 Princess Avenue; London ON	42°59′31″N 81°14′11″W	London municipality (14283)		
The Aeolian Hall	795 Dundas Street; London ON	42°59′27″N 81°13′30″W	London municipality (4402)		More images
Banting House National Historic Site of Canada	442 Adelaide Street North; London ON	42°59′23″N 81°13′54″W	Federal (4021)		More images
Baty House	700 Pond Mills Road; London ON	42°56′40″N 81°11′37″W	London municipality (10781)		
Beth-Emmanuel British Methodist Episcopal Church	430 Grey Street; London ON	42°58′48″N 81°14′06″W	London municipality (8429)		More images
Bishop Hellmuth Heritage Conservation District	Bishop Hellmuth Heritage Conservation District; London ON	42°59′56″N 81°15′03″W	London municipality (10788)		
Blackfriars Bridge	Blackfriars Street; London ON	42°59′20″N 81°15′26″W	London municipality (10079)		More images
Brick Street Cemetery	370 Commissioners Road West; London ON	42°57′19″N 81°16′50″W	London municipality (15190)		
Buchan House	566, Dundas Street; London ON		London municipality (8569)		More images
Carfrae Cottage	39 Carfrae Street; London ON	42°58′27″N 81°14′51″W	London municipality (10811)		
Carling House	36 Grosvenor Street; London ON	42°59′58″N 81°15′21″W	London municipality (10814)		
Chestnut Hill	55 Centre Street; London ON	42°57′37″N 81°15′53″W	London municipality (10904)		More images
Christ Anglican Church	138 Wellington Street; London ON	42°58′37″N 81°14′27″W	London municipality (10183)		More images
Crooks Property	22 Peter Street; London ON	42°59′23″N 81°14′11″W	London municipality (10910)		
Curnoe Property	38 Weston Street; London ON	42°58′13″N 81°14′02″W	London municipality (15305)		
Dominion Public Building	457 Richmond Street; London ON	42°59′06″N 81°15′04″W	Federal (3326), London municipality (10956)		
Dundas Centre United Church	482 Dundas Street; London ON	42°59′16″N 81°14′12″W	London municipality (10958)		
East Woodfield Heritage Conservation District	London ON	42°59′28″N 81°14′10″W	London municipality (10974)		Upload Photo
Eldon House	481 Ridout Street; London ON	42°59′05″N 81°15′19″W	London municipality (8075)		More images
Elsie Perrin Williams Estate	101 Windermere Road; London ON	43°00′37″N 81°17′28″W	London municipality (11032)		More images
Elsie Perrin Williams Memorial Library	305 Queens Avenue; London ON	42°59′11″N 81°14′39″W	London municipality (11193)		
Fire Hall No. 5	155 Adelaide Street North; London ON	42°58′52″N 81°13′43″W	London municipality (11219)		
First Christian Reformed Church	513 Talbot Street; London ON	42°59′11″N 81°15′14″W	London municipality (11220)		
Flint Cottage and Flint Shelter	1097 Commissioners Road West; London ON	42°57′26″N 81°19′21″W	London municipality (11222)		
Forks of the Thames Interpretive Centre	1 Dundas Street; London ON	42°58′54″N 81°15′21″W	London municipality (11622)		
Goodholme	291 Epworth Avenue; London ON	43°00′41″N 81°15′26″W	London municipality (10868)		More images
Grand Theatre	471 Richmond Street; London ON	42°59′09″N 81°15′03″W	London municipality (13715)		
Grosvenor Lodge	1017 Western Road; London ON	42°59′42″N 81°16′23″W	London municipality (10091)		More images
Hayman House	869 Dundas Street; London ON	42°59′36″N 81°13′20″W	London municipality (11632)		
J. Allyn Taylor Building	267 Dundas Street; London ON	42°59′05″N 81°14′44″W	London municipality (13718)		
Labatt Memorial Park	25 Wilson Avenue; London ON	42°59′01″N 81°15′30″W	London municipality (10078)		
Lawson Site	1600 Attawandaron Road; London ON	43°00′45″N 81°18′00″W	Ontario (1504)		More images
Loew's London Theatre	194 Dundas; London ON	42°59′03″N 81°14′54″W	London municipality (14367)		
London and Western Trusts	353 Richmond Street; London ON	42°58′56″N 81°14′57″W	London municipality (11689)		
London Mechanics Institute Building	229 Dundas Street; London ON	42°59′03″N 81°14′49″W	London municipality (11682)		
London Normal School	165 Elmwood Avenue East; London ON	42°58′14″N 81°15′04″W	Ontario (8871)		More images
London Psychiatric Hospital	850 Highbury Avenue North; London ON	43°00′14″N 81°12′16″W	London municipality (11684)		More images
London Tower	379 Dundas Street; London ON	42°59′09″N 81°14′25″W	London municipality (11681)		
McClary Cottage (95 High Street)	95 High Street; London ON	42°58′14″N 81°14′18″W	London municipality (14480)		More images
McClary Cottage (97 High Street)	97 High Street; London ON	42°58′14″N 81°14′18″W	London municipality (14484)		More images
McClary House	53 McClary; London ON	42°58′14″N 81°14′18″W	London municipality (14384)		More images
Middlesex County Court House	399 Ridout Street North, Ward 13; London ON	42°58′56″N 81°15′15″W	Federal (13537), Ontario (8873)		More images
New Brighton Housing Co-operative	473 Baker; London ON	42°58′05″N 81°14′28″W	London municipality (14443)		More images
Norton Attawandaron Site	150 Chelsea Avenue; London ON	42°58′18″N 81°16′44″W	London municipality (13721)		
‘O’ Block, Wolseley Barracks	London ON	43°00′00″N 81°14′00″W	Federal (11281)		Upload Photo
Old East Heritage Conservation District	London ON	42°59′38″N 81°13′35″W	London municipality (11863)		
Old Waterloo South Primary Public School	186 Waterloo Street; London ON	42°58′45″N 81°14′19″W	London municipality (13724)		
Palace Theatre	710 Dundas Street; London ON	42°59′24″N 81°13′41″W	London municipality (11868)		
Park Farm	120 Meadowlily Road South; London ON	42°57′59″N 81°11′06″W	London municipality (11881)		Upload Photo
Philip Aziz Property	150 Philip Aziz Avenue; London ON	43°00′08″N 81°16′31″W	London municipality (15471)		More images
Raleigh House	639 Barton Street; London ON	42°59′31″N 81°15′22″W	London municipality (12428)		Upload Photo
Ridout Street Complex National Historic Site of Canada	Ridout Street North; London ON	42°59′03″N 81°15′18″W	Federal (12873)		
St. Paul's Cathedral	472 Richmond Street; London ON	42°59′09″N 81°14′59″W	London municipality (15473)		More images
St. Peter's Seminary	1040 Waterloo Street; London ON	43°00′44″N 81°15′12″W	London municipality (8072)		More images
Scottsville Cemetery	5190 Colonel Talbot Road; London ON	42°53′11″N 81°17′22″W	London municipality (13725)		
Sterling Place	330 Clarence Street; London ON	42°58′56″N 81°14′46″W	London municipality (13191)		
Substation No. 4	119 Carling Street; London ON	42°59′01″N 81°15′06″W	London municipality (13252)		
T Block	650 Elizabeth Street; London ON	42°59′50″N 81°13′56″W	London municipality (14943)		More images
Thornwood	329 St. George Street; London ON	42°59′59″N 81°15′28″W	London municipality (13251)		
Victoria Park	580 Clarence Street; London ON	42°59′22″N 81°14′56″W	London municipality (10655)		More images
Waverly	10 Grand Avenue; London ON	42°58′19″N 81°14′49″W	London municipality (10592)		
Wolseley Barracks	London ON	42°59′55″N 81°13′59″W	Federal (3310)		
Wolseley Barracks National Historic Site of Canada	London ON	43°00′N 81°13′W	Federal (14341)		
Parkhill National Historic Site of Canada	West Corner Drive and Prance Road; Parkhill ON	43°12′05″N 81°45′00″W	Federal (10619)		Upload Photo
Battle Hill National Historic Site of Canada	Longwoods Road, Highway 2 Southwest Middlesex ON	42°41′39″N 81°42′20″W	Federal (13217)		More images

== See also ==
- List of historic places in Ontario
- List of National Historic Sites of Canada in Ontario
