= List of historic places in Perth County, Ontario =

This is a list of historic places in Perth County, Ontario, containing heritage sites listed on the Canadian Register of Historic Places (CRHP), all of which are designated as historic places either locally, provincially, territorially, nationally, or by more than one level of government.

== List of historic places ==
Name	Address	Coordinates	Government recognition (CRHP №)	Wikidata ID	Image
Fryfogel's Tavern	1931 Highway 7/8; Perth East (Shakespeare) ON	43°22′08″N 80°48′07″W	Ontario (10495)		More images
St. Marys Junction Railway Station (Grand Trunk) National Historic Site of Canada	5 James Street; Perth South ON	43°17′00″N 81°07′00″W	Federal (7780), Perth South municipality (14804)		More images
31 King Street South	31 King Street South; St. Marys ON	43°15′33″N 81°08′16″W	St. Marys municipality (13971)		Upload Photo
105-107 Queen Street West	105 Queen Street West; St. Marys ON	43°15′32″N 81°08′45″W	St. Marys municipality (13969)		Upload Photo
261 Widder Street East	261 Widder Street East; St. Marys ON	43°15′48″N 81°08′17″W	St. Marys municipality (13970)		Upload Photo
Armouries	26 Water Street South; St. Marys ON	43°15′31″N 81°08′36″W	St. Marys municipality (14476)		Upload Photo
Box House	75 Queen Street East; St. Marys ON	43°15′33″N 81°08′37″W	St. Marys municipality (14798)		Upload Photo
Church Street Bridge	Church Street North; St. Marys ON	43°15′41″N 81°08′28″W	St. Marys municipality (13972)		
First Hutton Block	6 Water Street North; St. Marys ON	43°15′33″N 81°08′37″W	St. Marys municipality (14799)		Upload Photo
Grand Central Hotel	150 Queen Street East; St. Marys ON	43°15′34″N 81°08′29″W	St. Marys municipality (14502)		Upload Photo
James Carter House	67 Peel; St. Marys ON	43°15′29″N 81°08′21″W	St. Marys municipality (14805)		Upload Photo
James Craig House	196 Widder Street East; St. Marys ON	43°15′47″N 81°08′24″W	St. Marys municipality (13973)		Upload Photo
John H. Clark House	108 Robinson Street; St. Marys ON	43°15′40″N 81°08′52″W	St. Marys municipality (14421)		Upload Photo
John McDonald Block	115 Queen Street East; St. Marys ON	43°15′34″N 81°08′33″W	St. Marys municipality (14504)		Upload Photo
Joseph Stafford House	107 Water Street North; St. Marys ON	43°15′44″N 81°08′39″W	St. Marys municipality (14422)		Upload Photo
M&M Block	6 Water; St. Marys ON	43°15′34″N 81°08′37″W	St. Marys municipality (14840)		Upload Photo
Mathieson House	109 Wellington Street North; St. Marys ON	43°15′45″N 81°08′34″W	St. Marys municipality (14501)		Upload Photo
Mill Race	St. Marys ON	43°15′32″N 81°08′42″W	St. Marys municipality (14474)		
Mount Pascoe	89 Ontario Street South; St. Marys ON	43°15′24″N 81°08′50″W	St. Marys municipality (14475)		Upload Photo
St. Marys Junction Railway Station (Grand Trunk)	Glass Street; St. Marys ON	43°16′18″N 81°07′54″W	Federal (7488)		
St. Marys Library	15 Church Street North; St. Marys ON	43°15′37″N 81°08′27″W	St. Marys municipality (14505)		Upload Photo
St. Marys Museum	177 Church; St. Marys ON	43°15′17″N 81°08′29″W	St. Marys municipality (14848)		Upload Photo
St. Marys Opera House	12 Water Street South; St. Marys ON	43°15′32″N 81°08′37″W	Ontario (8907)		More images
St. Marys Town Hall	175 Queen; St. Marys ON	43°15′34″N 81°08′27″W	St. Marys municipality (14862)		Upload Photo
Second Guest Block (East portion)	142 Queen; St. Marys ON	43°15′33″N 81°08′30″W	St. Marys municipality (14845)		Upload Photo
Water Tower	Queen Street East at James Street; St. Marys ON	43°15′36″N 81°08′13″W	St. Marys municipality (14873)		Upload Photo
6-8 Shakespeare Street	6 Shakespeare Street; Stratford ON	43°21′56″N 80°58′45″W	Stratford municipality (15006)		Upload Photo
16-20 Shrewsbury Street	16 Shrewsbury Street; Stratford ON	43°22′07″N 80°59′21″W	Stratford municipality (15769)		More images
20 Centre Street	20 Centre Street; Stratford ON	43°22′05″N 80°59′24″W	Stratford municipality (15002)		More images
21 George Street East	21 George Street East; Stratford ON	43°22′09″N 80°58′50″W	Stratford municipality (15004)		
46 Mornington Street	46 Mornington Street; Stratford ON	43°22′26″N 80°59′05″W	Stratford municipality (15005)		
52 Devon Street	52 Devon Street; Stratford ON	43°22′30″N 80°57′41″W	Stratford municipality (16248)		Upload Photo
55 Daly Avenue	55 Daly Avenue; Stratford ON	43°22′12″N 80°59′22″W	Stratford municipality (15883)		More images
55 Elizabeth Street	55 Elizabeth Street; Stratford ON	43°22′31″N 80°58′55″W	Stratford municipality (15832)		Upload Photo
63 William Street	63 William Street; Stratford ON	43°22′26″N 80°59′00″W	Stratford municipality (15859)		Upload Photo
67 Douro Street	67 Douro Street; Stratford ON	43°22′02″N 80°58′38″W	Stratford municipality (15772)		Upload Photo
68 Caledonia Street	68 Caledonia Street; Stratford ON	43°22′31″N 80°59′12″W	Stratford municipality (15822)		
72 Waterloo Street	72 Waterloo Street; Stratford ON	43°22′35″N 80°58′50″W	Stratford municipality (16249)		Upload Photo
86 Milton Street	86 Milton Street; Stratford ON	43°21′56″N 80°58′30″W	Stratford municipality (15884)		Upload Photo
90 Front Street	90 Front Street; Stratford ON	43°22′20″N 80°58′25″W	Stratford municipality (15774)		More images
96-100 Downie Street	96 Downie Street; Stratford ON	43°22′10″N 80°58′53″W	Stratford municipality (15861)		
100 Daly Avenue	100 Daly Avenue; Stratford ON	43°22′14″N 80°59′28″W	Stratford municipality (16026)		More images
104 Water Street	104 Water Street; Stratford ON	43°22′23″N 80°58′33″W	Stratford municipality (15763)		
109 Cobourg Street	109 Cobourg Street; Stratford ON	43°22′20″N 80°58′38″W	Stratford municipality (15764)		More images
111-117 Downie Street	111 Downie Street; Stratford ON	43°22′08″N 80°58′51″W	Stratford municipality (16027)		
111 Water Street	111 Water Street; Stratford ON	43°22′23″N 80°58′31″W	Stratford municipality (15765)		
117 Cobourg Street	117 Cobourg Street; Stratford ON	43°22′20″N 80°58′37″W	Stratford municipality (15766)		More images
119 Mornington Street	119 Mornington Street; Stratford ON	43°22′30″N 80°59′01″W	Stratford municipality (14986)		
129 Brunswick Street	129 Brunswick Street; Stratford ON	43°22′11″N 80°58′38″W	Stratford municipality (16245)		
132 St. Vincent Street North	132 St. Vincent Street North; Stratford ON	43°22′31″N 80°59′14″W	Stratford municipality (14987)		
203 William Street	203 William Street; Stratford ON	43°22′32″N 80°58′41″W	Stratford municipality (16246)		Upload Photo
208 Church Street	208 Church Street; Stratford ON	43°21′57″N 80°59′20″W	Stratford municipality (16247)		More images
258 Wellington Street	258 Wellington Street; Stratford ON	43°21′54″N 80°59′13″W	Stratford municipality (15882)		More images
Annie Macpherson Home	51 Avon Street; Stratford ON	43°22′22″N 80°59′32″W	Stratford municipality (16301)		Upload Photo
Armoury	Waterloo Street South at Albert Street; Stratford ON	43°22′15″N 80°58′44″W	Federal (11104)		Upload Photo
Baker House	88 Daly; Stratford ON	43°22′13″N 80°59′26″W	Stratford municipality (15821)		More images
Falstaff Public School	35 Waterloo; Stratford ON	43°22′33″N 80°58′48″W	Stratford municipality (15007)		Upload Photo
Former Canadian National Railways (VIA Rail) Station	101 Shakespeare Street; Stratford ON	43°21′53″N 80°58′32″W	Federal (15767)		Upload Photo
Gordon Block	2 Downie Street; Stratford ON	43°22′16″N 80°58′57″W	Ontario (8331)		More images
Larkworthy House	248 Ontario; Stratford ON	43°22′17″N 80°58′30″W	Stratford municipality (15823)		Upload Photo
MacPherson House	15 Norman; Stratford ON	43°22′22″N 80°59′16″W	Stratford municipality (15824)		Upload Photo
Orr Building	50 Cobourg Street; Stratford ON	43°22′20″N 80°58′51″W	Stratford municipality (15886)		More images
St. James' Anglican Church	41 Mornington Street; Stratford ON	43°22′26″N 80°59′03″W	Ontario (10579)		
Stratford City Hall National Historic Site of Canada	1 Market Square; Stratford ON	43°22′12″N 80°58′56″W	Federal (12644)		More images
Stratford Hotel	107 Erie Street; Stratford ON	43°22′11″N 80°59′03″W	Stratford municipality (15827)		Upload Photo
Stratford Normal School	270 Water Street; Stratford ON	43°22′22″N 80°58′10″W	Stratford municipality (15863)		More images
Stratford Waterworks	54 Romeo; Stratford ON	43°22′43″N 80°57′47″W	Stratford municipality (15008)		
Trow House	220 Cambria; Stratford ON	43°22′00″N 80°59′25″W	Stratford municipality (15830)		More images

== See also ==
- List of historic places in Ontario
- List of National Historic Sites of Canada in Ontario
