= Johnson Camden McKinley House =

Historic house in West Virginia, United States

- U.S. National Register of Historic Places
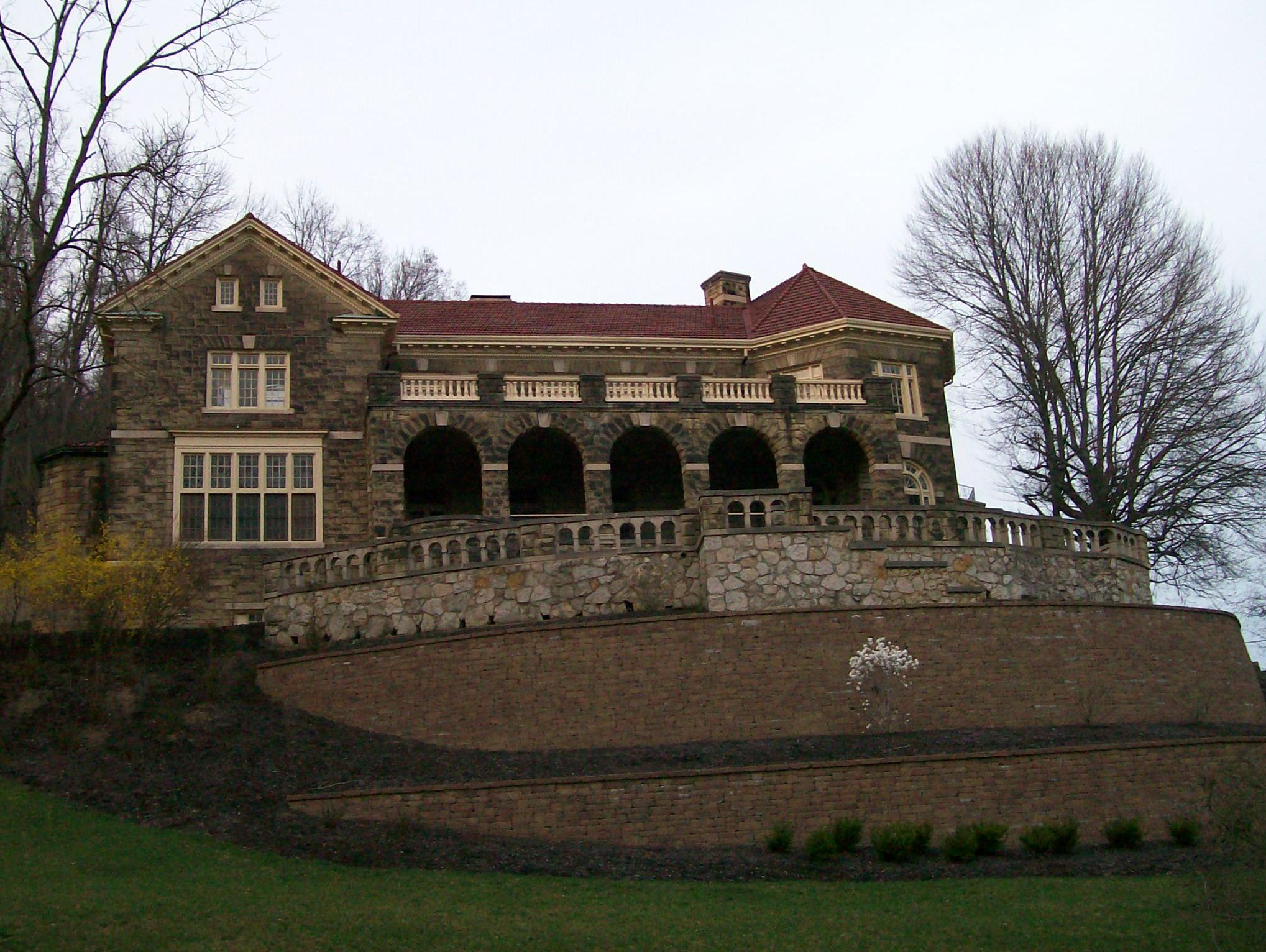
- Johnson Camden McKinley House, April 2010

- Location within West Virginia Location within the United States
- Location: 147 Bethany Pike, Wheeling, West Virginia
- Coordinates: 40°5′14″N 80°41′35″W
- Area: 4.5 acres (1.8 ha)
- Built: 1914-1920
- Architect: Fred Dempwolf
- NRHP reference No.: 83003251
- Added to NRHP: August 18, 1983

Johnson Camden McKinley House, also known as "Willow Glen," is a historic home located at Wheeling, Ohio County, West Virginia. It was built between 1914 and 1920, and is a 1 1/2-story massive dwelling built of ashlar sandstone. It consists of two wings that meet at right angles to form an L-shaped building. The front elevation features a balustraded, one-story loggia that encloses a broad verandah above the piazza. The interior has a two-story entrance rotunda, a grand salon, an English-style library and 30 or so additional chambers. The house was built for coal baron Johnson Camden McKinley and his wife Agra Bennett McKinley.

It was listed on the National Register of Historic Places in 1983.
