= List of historic places in Eastern Ontario =

This is a list of historic places in Eastern Ontario, containing heritage sites listed on the Canadian Register of Historic Places (CRHP), all of which are designated as historic places either locally, provincially, territorially, nationally, or by more than one level of government. There are separate listings for the cities of Kingston and Ottawa.

== List of historic places outside Kingston and Ottawa ==
=== Frontenac County ===
Name	Address	Coordinates	Government recognition (CRHP №)	Wikidata ID	Image
Lighthouse	Simcoe Island; Frontenac Islands ON	44°09′05″N 76°33′21″W	Federal (4749)		Upload Photo
Wolfe Island Township Hall National Historic Site of Canada	Main Street; Frontenac Islands ON	44°11′36″N 76°26′27″W	Federal (7553)		Upload Photo

=== Lanark County ===
Name	Address	Coordinates	Government recognition (CRHP №)	Wikidata ID	Image
Canadian Pacific Railway Station	110 Miguel Street; Carleton Place ON	45°08′10″N 76°08′08″W	Federal (6700)		Upload Photo
Victoria School Museum	267 Edmund Street; Carleton Place ON	45°08′36″N 76°08′49″W	Carleton Place municipality (7576)		
Lockmaster's House	Beveridges Lock, Rideau Canal National Historic Site of Canada; Drummond/North Elmsley ON	44°52′30″N 76°08′20″W	Federal (10917)		Upload Photo
Mary Jane Willson House	6570 Highway 43; Drummond/North Elmsley ON	44°54′20″N 76°12′59″W	Drummond/North Elmsley municipality (8426)		Upload Photo
McKinley House	2125 Scotch Line Road; Drummond/North Elmsley ON	44°53′07″N 76°15′05″W	Drummond/North Elmsley municipality (8466)		More images
Port Elmsley School	4962 Highway 43; Drummond/North Elmsley ON	44°53′30″N 76°06′43″W	Drummond/North Elmsley municipality (8434)		Upload Photo
Auld Kirk (c. 1836)	County Road 16; Mississippi Mills (Almonte) ON	45°12′42″N 76°13′06″W	Ontario (9943)		
Former Almonte Post Office National Historic Site of Canada	73 Mill Street; Mississippi Mills ON	45°13′32″N 76°11′43″W	Federal (15041), Ontario (7428)		More images
James Naismith House	4968 County Road 29; Mississippi Mills (Almonte) ON	45°14′32″N 76°13′53″W	Ontario (8186)		
Rosamond Woollen Mill National Historic Site of Canada	3 Rosamond Street East; Mississippi Mills (Almonte) ON	45°14′00″N 76°12′00″W	Federal (7864), Ontario (8881)		More images
Defensible Lockmaster's House	Kilmarnock Lock Station; Montague ON	44°53′02″N 75°55′50″W	Federal (10875)		
10 Market Square	10 Market Square; Perth ON	44°53′55″N 76°14′58″W	Perth municipality (7296)		More images
Barker-Wilson House	31 Foster St; Perth ON	44°54′07″N 76°14′59″W	Perth municipality (8351)		More images
Brooke-Matthews Building	51 Gore Street East; Perth ON	44°54′00″N 76°14′58″W	Perth municipality (8352)		More images
Daly Reid Building	13 Gore Street West; Perth ON	44°54′08″N 76°15′07″W	Perth municipality (8349)		More images
The Doctor's House	22 Wilson Street West; Perth ON	44°54′03″N 76°15′11″W	Perth municipality (8472)		More images
Haggart House (1837)	41 Mill Street; Perth ON	44°53′50″N 76°15′06″W	Perth municipality (8506)		More images
Hope Building	69 Foster Street; Perth ON	44°54′03″N 76°15′08″W	Perth municipality (8514)		
Inge-Va (1824)	66 Craig Street; Perth ON	44°53′47″N 76°14′50″W	Ontario (8178)		More images
Jean O'Donnell House	37 Herriott Street; Perth ON	44°54′05″N 76°14′59″W	Perth municipality (8515)		More images
Katherine Stephen Home	43 North Street; Perth ON	44°54′06″N 76°15′08″W	Perth municipality (17322)		
Kellock Block	39 Gore Street East; Perth ON	44°54′01″N 76°15′00″W	Perth municipality (8570)		More images
Maple Drop Building	2 Wilson Street East; Perth ON	44°53′58″N 76°15′05″W	Perth municipality (8425)		More images
Matheson House National Historic Site of Canada	11 Gore Street East; Perth ON	44°54′03″N 76°15′03″W	Federal (11553), Perth municipality (5608)		More images
Matthews Building	51 Gore Street East; Perth ON	44°54′00″N 76°14′58″W	Ontario (8872)		More images
Mckinley House	2125 Scotch Line County Road 4 Perth ON	44°31′33″N 76°09′04″W	Ontario (10515)		More images
McMartin House National Historic Site of Canada (1830)	125 Gore Street; Perth ON	44°53′54″N 76°14′49″W	Federal (7539), Ontario (9322)		More images
McMillan Building	77 Gore Street East; Perth ON	44°53′58″N 76°14′55″W	Ontario (8882), Perth municipality (8467)		More images
The Old Fire Hall	34 Herriott Street; Perth ON	44°54′02″N 76°14′59″W	Perth municipality (8473)		More images
Perkins Building	2 Wilson Street West; Perth ON	44°54′01″N 76°15′09″W	Perth municipality (8430)		More images
Perth Town Hall National Historic Site of Canada	80 Gore Street West; Perth ON	44°53′57″N 76°14′56″W	Federal (7541)		More images
Riverside Apartments	93 Gore Street East; Perth ON	44°53′56″N 76°14′53″W	Perth municipality (8469)		More images
St. Andrew's Presbyterian Church	1 Drummond Street West; Perth ON	44°54′08″N 76°14′59″W	Perth municipality (8471)		More images
St. George Hotel	15 Harvey Street; Perth ON	44°53′55″N 76°14′48″W	Perth municipality (8433)		More images
St. James the Apostle Anglican Church and Rectory	12 Harvey Street; Perth ON	44°53′59″N 76°14′41″W	Perth municipality (8479)		More images
Shaw's of Perth	1 Gore Street East; Perth ON	44°54′04″N 76°15′04″W	Perth municipality (8435)		More images
Sneyd House	44 South Street; Perth ON	44°53′36″N 76°14′20″W	Perth municipality (17582)		
Soong Building	69 Gore Street East; Perth ON	44°53′59″N 76°14′56″W	Perth municipality (8470)		More images
Waddell House	61 Drummond Street East; Perth ON	44°53′53″N 76°14′41″W	Perth municipality (8475)		More images
Defensible Lockmaster's House (Old Slys Locks Lockstation)	Old Slys Locks, Rideau Canal National Historic Site of Canada; Smiths Falls ON	44°53′38″N 76°00′16″W	Federal (10918)		
Defensible Lockmaster's House	Combined Locks, Rideau Canal National Historic Site of Canada; Smiths Falls ON	44°53′42″N 76°01′37″W	Federal (11005)		
East Mill	34 Beckwith Street South; Smiths Falls ON	44°53′54″N 76°01′16″W	Federal (10345)		More images
Heritage House Museum	11 Old Slys Road; Smiths Falls ON	44°53′21″N 76°00′27″W	Smiths Falls municipality (8518)		More images
The Recreation Centre	79 Beckwith Street North; Smiths Falls ON	44°54′10″N 76°01′18″W	Ontario (19795), Smiths Falls municipality (18594)		Upload Photo
Smiths Falls Bascule Bridge National Historic Site of Canada	Abbot Street; Smiths Falls ON	44°53′50″N 76°01′20″W	Federal (7867)		More images
Smiths Falls Railway Station (Canadian Northern) National Historic Site of Canada	80 Abbot Street; Smiths Falls ON	44°53′34″N 76°01′34″W	Federal (7786)		More images
Town Hall	77 Beckwith Street; Smiths Falls ON	44°54′09″N 76°01′17″W	Smiths Falls municipality (18595)		
West Mill	34 Beckwith Street South; Smiths Falls ON	44°53′54″N 76°01′16″W	Federal (10370)		Upload Photo

=== Leeds and Grenville United Counties ===
Name	Address	Coordinates	Government recognition (CRHP №)	Wikidata ID	Image
Homewood	1372 County Road 2 Augusta ON	44°39′21″N 75°35′17″W	Federal (12013), Ontario (8870)		More images
Armoury	1-9 East Avenue; Brockville ON	44°35′39″N 75°40′42″W	Federal (4809)		More images
Former Brockville Post Office National Historic Site of Canada	14 Court House Avenue; Brockville ON	44°35′24″N 75°41′05″W	Federal (1135)		More images
Fulford Place National Historic Site of Canada	287 King Street East; Brockville ON	44°35′53″N 75°40′16″W	Federal (10173)		More images
Leeds and Grenville County Court House National Historic Site of Canada	1 Court House Square; Brockville ON	44°35′28″N 75°41′09″W	Federal (7635)		More images
St. Paul's Church (Delta)	77 King Street; Delta ON	44°36′25″N 76°07′16″W	Federal (8480)		More images
Former Grand Trunk Railway (Canadian National Railways) Station	Ernestown ON	44°13′02″N 76°45′17″W	Federal (4551)		More images
Adelaide Island Picnic Shelter	St. Lawrence Islands National Park of Canada; Front of Yonge ON	44°26′04″N 75°50′24″W	Federal (11128)		Upload Photo
Aubrey Island Picnic Shelter	St. Lawrence Islands National Park of Canada; Front of Yonge ON	44°17′45″N 76°11′35″W	Federal (11093)		Upload Photo
Batterman's Point Complex	Batterman's Point, St. Lawrence Islands National Park of Canada; Front of Yonge ON	44°21′58″N 75°57′15″W	Federal (11620)		Upload Photo
Bridge Island / Chimney Island National Historic Site of Canada	Chimney Island; Front of Yonge ON	44°28′07″N 75°50′03″W	Federal (17987)		Upload Photo
Gazebo	St. Lawrence Islands National Park of Canada; Front of Yonge ON	44°22′00″N 75°57′13″W	Federal (11355)		More images
Gordon Island Pavilion	St. Lawrence Islands National Park of Canada; Front of Yonge ON	44°19′51″N 76°06′08″W	Federal (10048)		Upload Photo
Limberlost	Batterman's Point, St. Lawrence Islands National Park of Canada; Front of Yonge ON	44°21′56″N 75°57′16″W	Federal (11130)		
Mallorytown Landing Pavilion	Front of Yonge ON	44°27′05″N 75°51′33″W	Federal (11125)		Upload Photo
Massey Farmstead	eastern end of Grenadier Island, St. Lawrence Islands National Park of Canada; Front of Yonge ON	44°25′30″N 75°51′01″W	Federal (11510)		Upload Photo
Shelter	Beaurivage Island; St. Lawrence Islands National Park of Canada ON	44°18′12″N 76°11′15″W	Federal (14861)		Upload Photo
Shelter	Camelot Island; St. Lawrence Islands National Park of Canada ON	44°18′05″N 76°06′41″W	Federal (14827)		Upload Photo
Shelter	Endymion Island; St. Lawrence Islands National Park of Canada ON	44°18′09″N 76°05′56″W	Federal (14828)		Upload Photo
Water Tower	Batterman's Point, St. Lawrence Islands National Park of Canada; Front of Yonge ON	44°21′59″N 75°57′12″W	Federal (11131)		Upload Photo
West Grenadier Island Pavilion	St. Lawrence Islands National Park of Canada; Front of Yonge ON	44°23′00″N 75°54′20″W	Federal (11060)		Upload Photo
Lansdowne Iron Works National Historic Site of Canada	County Rd. 33 50 m west of Lyndhurst Bridge; Lyndhurst ON	44°32′58″N 76°07′34″W	Federal (18951)		Upload Photo
Pointe au Baril National Historic Site of Canada	20m on north side of Highway 2 Maitland ON	44°38′15″N 75°36′36″W	Federal (20107)		Upload Photo
Aaron Merrick House	905 St. Lawrence Street; Merrickville–Wolford ON	44°54′37″N 75°50′08″W	Merrickville–Wolford municipality (17601)		
Defensible Lockmaster's House	Clowes Lock, Rideau Canal National Historic Site of Canada; Merrickville–Wolford ON	44°56′42″N 75°49′19″W	Federal (10924)		Upload Photo
Defensible Lockmaster's House	Nicholson Lock, Rideau Canal National Historic Site of Canada; Merrickville–Wolford ON	44°57′03″N 75°49′03″W	Federal (10946)		Upload Photo
Foundry	On an island in the Rideau River, at Merrickville Lockstation; Merrickville–Wolford ON	44°55′04″N 75°50′13″W	Federal (11071)		Upload Photo
Hutchins-Heroux Commercial Building	212 St. Lawrence Street; Merrickville–Wolford ON	44°54′55″N 75°50′12″W	Merrickville–Wolford municipality (17602)		
Jakes-McLean Block	105 St. Lawrence Street; Merrickville–Wolford ON	44°54′58″N 75°50′12″W	Ontario (7694)		Upload Photo
Merrickville Blockhouse	279 Saint Lawrence Street; Merrickville–Wolford ON	44°55′00″N 75°50′15″W	Federal (4358, (7445)		More images
8 Mary Street	8 Mary Street; North Grenville ON	45°00′54″N 75°38′28″W	North Grenville municipality (17301)		Upload Photo
Actons Corners School	1631 Highway 43; North Grenville ON	45°00′20″N 75°41′04″W	North Grenville municipality (17302)		Upload Photo
Kemptville Public Library	207 Prescott Street; North Grenville (Kemptville) ON	45°00′54″N 75°38′41″W	North Grenville (Kemptville) municipality (17321)		Upload Photo
Lyman Clothier House	8 Clothier Street West; North Grenville (Kemptville) ON	45°00′58″N 75°38′53″W	North Grenville (Kemptville) municipality (17384)		Upload Photo
Maplewood Hall	92 Maplewood Avenue; North Grenville ON	44°57′47″N 75°40′42″W	North Grenville municipality (17383)		Upload Photo
Oxford-on-Rideau Township Hall National Historic Site of Canada	100 Maplewood Street; North Grenville ON	44°58′00″N 75°41′00″W	Federal (7690), North Grenville municipality (17382)		Upload Photo
Battle of the Windmill National Historic Site of Canada	County Road 2 East; Prescott ON	44°43′16″N 75°29′13″W	Federal (13962)		More images
Battle of the Windmill Windmill Tower	Prescott ON	44°42′47″N 75°30′33″W	Federal (4736, (20373)		More images
Caponier	Fort Wellington National Historic Site; Prescott ON	44°42′46″N 75°30′30″W	Federal (10099)		Upload Photo
Former Grand Trunk Railway (Canadian National Railways) Station	St. Lawrence and Railway Streets; Prescott ON	44°42′40″N 75°31′30″W	Federal (4550)		More images
Fort Wellington National Historic Site of Canada	King Street; Prescott ON	44°42′47″N 75°30′32″W	Federal (7618, (9818)		More images
Latrine	Fort Wellington National Historic Site; Prescott ON	44°42′47″N 75°30′32″W	Federal (9797)		Upload Photo
Officers' Quarters	Fort Wellington National Historic Site; Prescott ON	44°42′47″N 75°30′32″W	Federal (9786)		Upload Photo
Prescott Railway Station (Grand Trunk) National Historic Site of Canada	820 St. Lawrence Street; Prescott ON	44°42′40″N 75°31′29″W	Federal (7659)		More images
Blacksmith's Shop	Near the Jones Falls lock station Rideau Lakes ON	44°32′45″N 76°14′18″W	Federal (9819)		More images
Cottage	Colonel By Island; Rideau Lakes ON	44°44′08″N 76°13′16″W	Federal (10326)		Upload Photo 44.647310, -76.321689
Blockhouse	Blockhouse Lane, Newboro; Rideau Lakes ON	44°42′12″N 76°17′45″W	Federal (10991)		
Blockhouse	Narrow Lakes Road at the Rideau Canal; Rideau Lakes ON	44°42′12″N 76°17′45″W	Federal (10858)		
Defensible Lockmaster's House	Rideau Canal National Historic Site of Canada; Rideau Lakes ON	44°53′35″N 76°03′22″W	Federal (10916)		
Defensible Lockmaster's House	Jones Falls Lockstation; Rideau Lakes (Jones Falls) ON	44°32′49″N 76°14′17″W	Federal (10992)		
Defensible Lockmaster's House	Chaffeys Lockstation; Rideau Lakes (Chaffeys Falls) ON	44°34′44″N 76°19′10″W	Federal (4765)		
Elgin United Church	77 Main Street; Rideau Lakes (Elgin) ON	44°36′36″N 76°13′07″W	Rideau Lakes (Elgin) municipality (8344)		More images
Emmanuel Anglican Church	2767 Highway 15; Rideau Lakes (Portland) ON	44°41′16″N 76°12′15″W	Rideau Lakes (Portland) municipality (8411)		More images
The Guthrie House	10 Perth Street; Rideau Lakes (Elgin) ON	44°36′29″N 76°13′23″W	Rideau Lakes (Elgin) municipality (8483)		More images
The Horace Sheldon House	3196 Sheldon Road; Rideau Lakes (Portland) ON	44°41′38″N 76°13′09″W	Rideau Lakes (Portland) municipality (17282)		Upload Photo
John Green House	2346 Harlem Road; Rideau Lakes (Harlem) ON	44°40′24″N 76°08′59″W	Rideau Lakes (Harlem) municipality (9559)		Upload Photo
Morton-McLeod House	12 Queen Street; Rideau Lakes (Morton) ON	44°32′16″N 76°11′54″W	Rideau Lakes (Morton) municipality (17281)		Upload Photo
Old Stone Mill National Historic Site of Canada	Highway 42; Rideau Lakes ON	44°36′37″N 76°07′21″W	Federal (12127), Rideau Lakes municipality (8427)		More images
Pennock-St. Pierre House	176 Charland Road; Rideau Lakes (Elgin) ON	44°37′28″N 76°13′12″W	Rideau Lakes (Elgin) municipality (8468)		Upload Photo
Philo Hicock House	8 King Street; Rideau Lakes (Delta) ON	44°37′11″N 76°07′28″W	Rideau Lakes (Delta) municipality (8431)		More images
Red Brick School	48 Halladay Street; Rideau Lakes (Elgin) ON	44°36′29″N 76°13′10″W	Rideau Lakes (Elgin) municipality (8432)		More images
St. Paul's Anglican Church	77 King Street; Rideau Lakes (Delta) ON	44°36′27″N 76°07′18″W	Rideau Lakes (Delta) municipality (8480)		More images
St. Peter's Anglican Church	3600 Newboyne Road; Rideau Lakes (Newboyne) ON	44°44′01″N 76°06′36″W	Rideau Lakes (Newboyne) municipality (8476)		More images
Storehouse, Lock Office	Davis Lock, Rideau Canal National Historic Site of Canada; Rideau Lakes ON	44°33′47″N 76°17′28″W	Federal (10884)		Upload Photo
Darlingside National Historic Site of Canada	Along the Thousands Island Parkway; Rockport ON		Federal (20125)		Upload Photo
David Laidlaw House	328 Centreville Road; Westport ON	44°40′36″N 76°23′50″W	Westport municipality (8350)		Upload Photo

=== Lennox and Addington County ===
Name	Address	Coordinates	Government recognition (CRHP №)	Wikidata ID	Image
Mazinaw Pictographs National Historic Site of Canada	Bon Echo Provincial Park; Addington Highlands (most) ON	44°54′00″N 77°12′23″W	Federal (10534)		More images
Allison House and Grounds	54 Adolphustown Park Road; Greater Napanee ON	44°03′41″N 77°00′28″W	Ontario (8842)		Upload Photo
Macpherson House	180 Elizabeth Street; Greater Napanee ON	44°15′12″N 76°56′44″W	Ontario (10510)		Upload Photo
Napanee Post Office	36 Bridge Street; Greater Napanee ON	44°14′57″N 76°57′01″W	Ontario (8340)		More images
Napanee Town Hall National Historic Site of Canada	Greater Napanee ON	44°14′55″N 76°57′03″W	Federal (10698)		More images
Old Hay Bay Church National Historic Site of Canada	2365 South Shore Road; Greater Napanee ON	44°06′08″N 77°01′12″W	Federal (10617)		More images
Layer Cake Hall	193 Davey Street; Loyalist ON	44°06′38″N 76°27′50″W	Ontario (10508)		Upload Photo
Madden Store	397 Main Street; Stone Mills ON	44°19′26″N 76°52′32″W	Ontario (8332)		Upload Photo
Newburgh Academy	411 Academy Street; Stone Mills ON	44°19′27″N 76°52′54″W	Ontario (8339)		Upload Photo

=== United Counties of Prescott and Russell ===
Name	Address	Coordinates	Government recognition (CRHP №)	Wikidata ID	Image
Canadian National Railways Station	66 St. Joseph Street; Casselman ON	45°18′44″N 75°05′15″W	Federal (4621)		More images
L'Orignal Court House and Jail	59 Court Street; Champlain (L'Orignal) ON	45°37′06″N 74°41′23″W	Champlain (L'Orignal) municipality (15467)		More images
Macdonell-Williamson House National Historic Site of Canada	25, chemin des Outaouais; East Hawkesbury (Chute-à-Blondeau) ON	45°33′49″N 74°23′01″W	Federal (12070)		More images

=== Renfrew County ===
Name	Address	Coordinates	Government recognition (CRHP №)	Wikidata ID	Image
Gillies Grove and House National Historic Site of Canada	412 Gillies Grove; Arnprior ON	45°26′42″N 76°21′30″W	Federal (4213)		Upload Photo
Armoury	177 Victoria Street; Pembroke ON	45°49′36″N 77°06′50″W	Federal (4707)		Upload Photo
Building F-16	CFB Petawawa; Petawawa ON	45°55′06″N 77°17′28″W	Federal (9540)		Upload Photo
Government Building	249 Raglan Street; Renfrew ON	45°28′45″N 76°41′35″W	Federal (4672)		

=== United Counties of Stormont, Dundas and Glengarry ===
Name	Address	Coordinates	Government recognition (CRHP №)	Wikidata ID	Image
Cornwall Armoury	505 4th Street East; Cornwall ON	45°01′31″N 74°43′09″W	Federal (11228)		
Glengarry House National Historic Site of Canada	ruins at Stonehouse Point; Cornwall ON	45°02′22″N 74°37′09″W	Federal (13373)		
Inverarden House National Historic Site of Canada	Montreal Road; Cornwall ON	45°01′53″N 74°40′16″W	Federal (9488, (7444)		More images
VIA Rail/Canadian National Railways Station	27 McDougall Street; North Glengarry (Alexandria) ON	45°19′05″N 74°38′24″W	Federal (4620)		More images
Battle of Crysler's Farm National Historic Site of Canada	Crysler's Farm Battlefield Park, near Upper Canada Village; South Dundas (Morrisburg) ON	44°56′31″N 75°04′12″W	Federal (15771)		More images
Bethune-Thompson House / White House National Historic Site of Canada	19730 John Street; South Glengarry (Williamstown) ON	45°08′47″N 74°35′03″W	Federal (4121), Ontario (19800)		More images
Bethune Thompson Workers' Cottage	19730 John Street (County Road 17); South Glengarry (Williamstown) ON	45°08′38″N 74°34′32″W	Ontario (9957)		Upload Photo
Ruin of St. Raphael's Roman Catholic Church National Historic Site of Canada	20000 King's Road (County Road 18); South Glengarry ON	45°12′50″N 74°35′37″W	Federal (14123), Ontario (19806)		More images
Sir John Johnson House National Historic Site of Canada	on a hill overlooking the Raisin River; South Glengarry (Williamstown) ON	45°08′42″N 74°34′46″W	Federal (16922, (7866)		More images

== See also ==
- List of historic places in Ontario
- List of National Historic Sites of Canada in Ontario
