= List of National Historic Sites of Canada in Ontario =

This is a list of National Historic Sites (French: Lieux historiques nationaux) in the province of Ontario. As of July 2021, there were 274 sites designated in Ontario, 39 of which are administered by Parks Canada (identified below and on the cluster pages listed below by the beaver icon ). Of all provinces and territories, Ontario has the greatest number of National Historic Sites, and the largest number under Parks Canada administration, with a dense concentration in southern Ontario. The five largest clusters are listed separately:

· List of National Historic Sites in Hamilton
· List of National Historic Sites in Kingston
· List of National Historic Sites in Niagara Region
· List of National Historic Sites in Ottawa
· List of National Historic Sites in Toronto

Numerous National Historic Events also occurred across Ontario, and are identified at places associated with them, using the same style of federal plaque which marks National Historic Sites. Several National Historic Persons are commemorated throughout the province in the same way. The markers do not indicate which designation—a Site, Event, or Person—a subject has been given. The Rideau Canal is a Site, for example, while the Welland Canal is an Event. The cairn and plaque to John Macdonell does not refer to a National Historic Person, but is erected because his home, Glengarry House, is a National Historic Site. Similarly, the plaque to John Guy officially marks not a Person, but an Event—the Landing of John Guy.

This list uses names designated by the national Historic Sites and Monuments Board, which may differ from other names for these sites.

* UNESCO World Heritage Site unit

== National Historic Sites ==
| Site | Date(s) | Designated | Location | Description | Image |
|---|---|---|---|---|---|
| Adelaide Hunter Hoodless Homestead | 1839 (completed) | 1995 | Brant County; 43°14′13″N 80°17′48″W | The childhood home of activist and organizer Adelaide Hunter Hoodless, educational reformer and co-founder of the Women's Institute, the National Council of Women of Canada and the Victorian Order of Nurses | Adelaide Hunter Hoodless NHS, St. George, ON |
| Algoma Central Engine House | 1912 (completed) | 1992 | Sault Ste. Marie; 46°31′41.38″N 84°21′1.94″W | A well-preserved example of a brick engine house, and the first in Canada to have an internal turntable | |
| Algonquin Provincial Park | 1893 (established) | 1992 | Nipissing - Unorganized South Part (primarily); 45°35′03″N 78°21′30″W | The first provincial park in Canada, noted for its pioneering role in park management, visitor interpretation programs and the development of park buildings and structures, as well as its role in inspiring artists such as the Group of Seven | View from the Cache Lake lookout in Algonquin Park |
| Amherstburg First Baptist Church | 1849 (completed) | 2012 | Amherstburg; 42°6′9.66″N 83°6′20.65″W | A modest wooden church that was a major Underground Railroad church in Upper Canada and that played a crucial role in the development of the Black community in Ontario | Frontal view of Amherstburg First Baptist Church |
| Amherstburg Navy Yard | 1796 (established) | 1928 | Amherstburg; 42°6′6.78″N 83°6′45.21″W | The site of a Royal Navy shipyard from 1796–1813, which served as the hub of the British naval presence on the upper Great Lakes | King's Navy Yard Park at Amherstburg |
| Annandale House/Tillsonburg Museum | 1882 (completed) | 1997 | Tillsonburg; 42°51′45″N 80°43′18″W | One of the best surviving illustrations in Canada of the Aesthetic Movement and the movement's major impact on domestic architecture in Canada | Exterior view of Annandale House |
| Backhouse Grist Mill | 1798 (completed) | 1998 | Norfolk County; 42°38′33.72″N 80°28′29.28″W | One of the few gristmills in this region not to be burned during the War of 1812, it is one of the oldest and best preserved examples in Canada of small-scale, water-powered establishments found throughout the country in the 19th and early 20th centuries | Backhouse Grist Mill NHS near Port Rowan, ON |
| Banting House | 1900 (completed) | 1997 | London; 42°59′23.85″N 81°13′54.46″W | A yellow-brick house recognized as the site of the defining moment in the discovery of insulin by Frederick Banting | Exterior view of Banting House |
| Barnum House | 1820 (completed) | 1959 | Grafton; 43°59′39.97″N 78°0′57.2″W | A noted example of Neoclassic domestic architecture as brought to Canada by settlers from New England | Exterior view of Barnum House |
| Battle Hill | 1814 (battle) | 1924 | Southwest Middlesex; 42°41′39″N 81°42′18″W | The site of the Battle of Longwoods during the War of 1812 | A federal cairn and plaque marks Battle Hill National Historic Site |
| Battle of Crysler's Farm | 1813 (battle) | 1920 | South Dundas; 44°56′31.12″N 75°04′12.62″W | The site of a victory by badly outnumbered British troops in the War of 1812, prompting the American forces to abandon the St. Lawrence Campaign; the original battle site was submerged in 1958 by the construction of the Saint Lawrence Seaway, so the 1895 monument was relocated to its current location in Crysler's Farm Battlefield Park near Upper Canada Village | view of the Crysler's Farm monument in 2010 |
| Battle of the Windmill | 1838 (battle) | 1920 | Prescott; 44°43′15.24″N 75°29′13.56″W | The site a battle fought during the Upper Canada Rebellion, whereby Loyalist forces defeated an invasion attempt by Hunter Patriot insurgents based in the United States | The battle site in 2008, with the original windmill structure (converted to a lighthouse in 1846) |
| Beausoleil Island | | 2011 | Muskoka District; 44°51′57.96″N 79°52′11.64″W | An island within Georgian Bay Islands National Park; a cultural landscape of the Anishinaabeg | View of the shore on Beausoleil Island |
| Beechcroft and Lakehurst Gardens | 1870 (ca.) (established) | 1978 | Roches Point; 44°16′23.92″N 79°30′10.89″W | Gardens reportedly designed by Frederick Law Olmsted | The garden wall is one feature amidst towering trees on a lakefront property now subdivided at Roches Point, ON |
| Bell Homestead | 1858 (completed) | 1996 | Brantford; 43°6′28.5″N 80°16′15.01″W | The first home of Alexander Graham Bell in North America, it is associated with the conception of and early long-distance trials of the telephone | An exterior view of the Bell Homestead |
| Belle Vue | 1819 (completed) | 1959 | Amherstburg; 42°5′35.6″N 83°6′45.99″W | A two-storey, white painted, brick house constructed for the Deputy Assistant Commissary General of the garrison at Fort Malden, ranking among the finest examples of Palladian architecture in Canada | Belle Vue NHS in Amherstburg, ON, in a neglected state in 2011 |
| Belleville Railway Station (Grand Trunk) | 1856 (completed) | 1973 | Belleville; 44°10′44.41″N 77°22′29.05″W | A railway station representative of the larger stations erected for the newly formed Grand Trunk Railway along the key Toronto to Montreal line during the mid-19th century, it is the oldest continuously operating passenger train station in Canada | Exterior view of the Belleville Railway Station |
| Bethune Memorial House | 1880 (completed) | 1996 | Gravenhurst; 44°55′13.45″N 79°22′34.09″W | The birthplace of Dr. Norman Bethune | Exterior view of Bethune House |
| Bethune-Thompson House / White House | 1805 (completed) | 1966 | Williamstown; 45°8′37.67″N 74°34′29.24″W | A noted early Ontario home, representative of the design and construction techniques from the period; portions date to the 1780s when Loyalist Peter Ferguson settled on the site, but the main structure was built in 1805 as a manse for Reverend John Bethune, the first Presbyterian minister in Upper Canada and was later the residence of explorer David Thompson | Bethune-Thompson House/White House NHS, Elora, ON |
| Billy Bishop Boyhood Home | 1884 (completed) | 2002 | Owen Sound; 44°33′59″N 80°56′51.5″W | The birthplace and childhood home of First World War flying ace Billy Bishop | Exterior view of the Billy Bishop Home and Museum |
| Bois Blanc Island Lighthouse and Blockhouse | 1837 (lighthouse completed), 1839 (blockhouse completed) | 1955 | Bois Blanc Island; 42°5′16.17″N 83°7′11.48″W | The site of the attack by Canadian rebels and their American supporters in January 1838 during the Upper Canada Rebellion; in response to the raid, the blockhouse was built to complement the reconstructed Fort Malden | The lighthouse forms part of Bois Blanc Island Lighthouse and Blockhouse NHS, Boblo Island, ON The blockhouse forms part of Bois Blanc Island Lighthouse and Blockhouse NHS, Boblo Island, ON |
| Bridge Island / Chimney Island | 1814 (blockhouse completed) | 1936 | Front of Yonge; 44°28′7.11″N 75°50′4.21″W | Formerly the site of a naval station during the War of 1812 | |
| Buxton Settlement | 1849 (established) | 1999 | Chatham-Kent; 42°18′20.4″N 82°13′13.5″W | A community founded by abolitionist Reverend William King, 15 former American slaves, and an association which included James Bruce, 8th Earl of Elgin, then the Governor General of Canada, to create a haven for fugitive slaves escaping via the Underground Railroad | Buxton Settlement NHS, Buxton, ON |
| CCGS Alexander Henry | 1959 to 1985 | 2023 | Thunder Bay; 48.425871°N 89.221546°W | Great Lakes icebreaker | |
| Canadian Car & Foundry | 1912 (completed) | 2009 | Thunder Bay; 48°21′25.37″N 89°18′20.42″W | Located within the Bombardier Transportation facility, the historic complex was the main plant of Canada's largest aircraft manufacturer during the Second World War, with 10% of the world's production of the Hurricane built there; representative of the wartime contributions made by women workers and of the country's post-war mass-transit manufacturing industry | Contemporary image of the Canadian-built Hurricane IIB taking off |
| Canal Lake Concrete Arch Bridge | 1905 (completed) | 1988 | Bolsover; 44°33′29.91″N 79°2′46.02″W | A bridge spanning the Trent-Severn Waterway, it is the earliest known reinforced concrete bridge in Canada | Canal Lake Concrete Arch Bridge NHS, Bolsover, ON |
| Carrying Place of the Bay of Quinte | 1787 (treaty negotiated) | 1929 | Carrying Place; 44°2′54.77″N 77°34′58.35″W | The location where Sir John Johnson and Chiefs of the Mississauga negotiated a treaty ceding a river and portage route between Lake Ontario and Lake Huron | Cairn at Carrying Place |
| Castle Kilbride | 1877 (completed) | 1993 | Baden; 43°24′15″N 80°40′17″W | An Italianate villa, the former residence of the "Flax and Oil King of Canada" James Livingston, known for its interior decorative mural paintings | Exterior view of the front facade of Castle Kilbride |
| Chiefswood | 1856 (completed) | 1953 | Six Nations of the Grand River First Nation; 43°6′3.88″N 80°5′41.88″W | Italianate-style birthplace of poet E. Pauline Johnson | Black and white exterior view of Chiefswood and surrounding trees |
| Christ Church, His Majesty's Chapel Royal of the Mohawk | 1843 (completed) | 1995 | Deseronto; 44°11′7.93″N 77°4′24.26″W | A historic chapel linked with establishment of Mohawk nation in Ontario; one of only two Royal chapels in Canada, representing the historic alliance between the British Crown and the Mohawk peoples | Exterior of Christ Church Royal Chapel |
| Claverleigh | 1871 (completed) | 1990 | Creemore; 44°19′4.85″N 80°6′7.84″W | A noted example of a Gothic Revival-style wood villa | |
| Cliff Site | 1670 (event) | 1919 | Port Dover; 42°47′8.13″N 80°11′46.72″W | Marked by a large memorial cross, the site where two Sulpician priests, François Dollier de Casson and René de Bréhant de Galinée, laid claim to the north shore of Lake Erie in the name of France | The cross and plaques at Cliff Site mark the first commemoration of a national historic site in the country. |
| Cobalt Mining District | 1903 (established) | 2002 | Cobalt; 47°23′51.34″N 79°40′27.67″W | A cultural landscape comprising buildings and structures associated with early 20th-century silver mining and urban settlement, once one of the largest silver producing areas in the world | Historic mines in Cobalt |
| Cox Terrace | 1884 (completed) | 1991 | Peterborough; 44°18′13.56″N 78°19′34.4″W | A noted example of a residential terrace built in the Second Empire style | View of front of Cox Terrace |
| Cummins Pre-contact Site | | 1981 | Thunder Bay; 48°24′21″N 89°21′12″W | A site once on the shoreline of glacial Lake Minong; extensive late Paleo-Indian quarry | |
| Darlingside | 1830 (established) | 1992 | Leeds and the Thousand Islands; 44°22.097′N 75°58.159′W | Rare surviving example of the wood depots that sold fuel to the steamboats that plied the St. Lawrence River and the Great Lakes | Plaques at the Darlingside site |
| David Dunlap Observatory | 1935 (established) | 2019-07-31 | Richmond Hill; 43.862954°N 79.422687°W | The country's first teaching observatory and world's second-largest telescope was key in establishing academic astronomy; existence of black holes confirmed here | |
| Donaldson site | 500 BC - 300 AD | 1982 | Chippewa Hill; 44°30′20.72″N 81°20′2.55″W | A 1.2-hectare (3.0-acre) archaeological site; the largest and best documented Saugeen complex site known, representing many habitation and mortuary practices of the Woodland period | |
| Ermatinger House | 1823 (completed) | 1957 | Sault Ste. Marie; 46°30′22.53″N 84°19′28.66″W | A stone house believed to be the oldest surviving house in Northwestern Ontario, it was built by Charles Oakes Ermatinger, an active partner of the North West Company, and was used as a temporary headquarters by Garnet Wolseley, 1st Viscount Wolseley during the Red River Expedition | Exterior view of Ermatinger House in winter |
| Etharita Site | 1647–49 | 1982 | Clearview; 44°24′43.2″N 80°12′38.1″W | The main village of the Wolf Tribe of the Petun | |
| Fairfield on the Thames | 1792 (established), 1813 (destroyed) | 1945 | Chatham–Kent; 42°37′55.77″N 81°52′11.03″W | The site of the original village of Fairfield, founded in 1792 by Aboriginal refugees and Moravian missionaries who came to Canada from Ohio, fleeing persecution in the United States after refusing to take sides during the American Revolutionary War; the village was destroyed in 1813 by American invaders during the War of 1812, when the inhabitants were accused of sheltering British officers | Exterior view of a replica of a cottage from the original village of Fairfield |
| Finnish Labour Temple | 1910 (completed) | 2011 | Thunder Bay; 48°25′56″N 89°13′48″W | A two-storey brick building that played an important social and community role for Finnish immigrants to Canada | Exterior view of the Finnish Labour Temple and nearby buildings |
| First Commercial Oil Field | 1858 (discovery of oil) | 1925 | Oil Springs; 42°47′0.3″N 82°7′0.38″W | The site of the first commercial oil well in the world, the first drilled well in Canada, the first gumbeds that were commercially used in the world, and the first gas gusher in Canada | |
| Forbes Textile Mill | 1863 (established) | 1989 | Cambridge; 43°25′39.04″N 80°19′12.58″W | A wool mill that was, for a time in the early decades of the twentieth century, the largest woollen and worsted mill in Canada | Forbes Textile Mill NHS, Cambridge, ON |
| Former Almonte Post Office | 1891 (completed) | 1983 | Almonte; 45°13′31.95″N 76°11′42.51″W | A stone post office with a steep gabled roof and central clock tower; designed by Thomas Fuller, the building has undergone no major exterior alterations, so remains an excellent representative example of early multi-use federal buildings in small communities | Exterior view of the former Almonte post office |
| Former Bowmanville Boys Training School/Camp 30 | 1924 (established) | 2013 | Bowmanville; 43°55′38″N 78°40′3″W | A group of Prairie-style buildings originally constructed as a progressive boys school, and used during the Second World War as an internment camp for German prisoners of war | Exterior view of the derelict camp buildings with broken windows |
| Former Brockville Post Office | 1886 (completed) | 1983 | Brockville; 44°35′23.32″N 75°41′5.58″W | A stone post office, blending Flemish bond, Queen Anne and classical elements; a good example of the post offices erected by the Department of Public Works in smaller urban centres during Thomas Fuller's term as Chief Dominion Architect | |
| Former Elora Drill Shed | 1865 (completed) | 1989 | Elora; 43°40′48.2″N 80°25′44.01″W | A good representative example of the early stage in drill hall construction in Canada (when rural militia units, rather than the Department of Defence, were responsible for their construction), noted for its classical proportions, the fanlight over the door and the oculus in the gable | Former Elora Drill Shed NHS, Elora, ON |
| Former Galt Post Office | 1887 (completed) | 1983 | Cambridge; 43°21′30.08″N 80°18′55.99″W | A limestone-clad post office, blending elements of Romanesque Revival, Gothic Revival and Second Empire architectural styles; representative of small urban post offices designed by Thomas Fuller | Exterior view of Former Galt Post Office |
| Former Paris Town Hall | 1854 (built) | 2020-10-21 | Paris; 43.190437°N 80.379671°W | Rare Gothic Revival civic building | |
| Former Port Perry Town Hall | 1873 (completed) | 1984 | Port Perry; 44°6′11.87″N 78°56′50.16″W | A noted example of a municipal meeting hall; the lower hall was used for village council meetings, and the balconied opera house on the second storey served as the village's social centre | Former Port Perry Town Hall NHS, Port Perry, ON |
| Former Shingwauk Residential School | 1874 (built); 1874-1970 (operated) | 2021-07-08 | Sault Ste. Marie; 46.50112°N 84.2872°W | One of the few remaining Indian boarding school sites, including built heritage and historic landscape elements | Former Shingwauk Residential School NHS, Sault Ste. Marine, ON |
| Fort Malden | 1799 (Fort Amherstburg completed), 1815 (fort initially rebuilt) | 1921 | Amherstburg; 42°6′27.76″N 83°6′45.52″W | British fort (initially known as Fort Amherstburg) that served as the principal defence of the western frontier for the period until 1813 (when it was captured and later destroyed by the Americans), and also served as an important fortification during the border raids associated with the Upper Canada Rebellion in 1837-38 | Image of the Tecumseh Stone, and accompanying plaque, at Fort Malden; Tecumseh reportedly stood on the stone to address British troops after the Battle of Lake Erie |
| Fort Norfolk (Turkey Point) | 1814 (completed) | 1925 | Norfolk County; 42°41′57.86″N 80°19′29.9″W | The site of a British military and naval post between 1814 and 1815; abandoned shortly after the War of 1812 | Fort Norfolk NHS, Turkey Point Prov. Park, ON |
| Fort Sainte Marie II | 1649 (established) | 1920 | Christian Island; 44°49′26.98″N 80°9′51.24″W | A Jesuit mission to the Wendat 1649-50; in 1651, remaining Wendat made their last stand against the Haudenosaunee from this mission before fleeing to Quebec | |
| Fort St. Joseph | 1796 (established) | 1923 | St. Joseph Island; 46°03′48″N 83°56′48″W | Built as a counterpoint to an American garrison on Mackinac Island, Fort St. Joseph was the British Empire's most westerly outpost; destroyed by the Americans in 1812 when British forces left to take Fort Michilimackinac; the ruins of the fortifications and the archaeological resources on the site reveal the complex aspects of military, domestic and commercial life (both Aboriginal and European) in a frontier outpost | View of the remains of the foundation of the blockhouse at Fort St. Joseph |
| Fort St. Pierre | 1731 (established) | 1934 | Fort Frances; 48°37′6.19″N 93°21′36.36″W | The first French fort built west of Fort Kaministiquia by Pierre La Vérendrye in Northwestern Ontario | |
| Fort Wellington | 1813 (established) | 1920 | Prescott; 44°42′46.44″N 75°30′30.6″W | One of the best preserved nineteenth-century fortifications in Canada, the fort protected shipping along the St. Lawrence River during War of 1812 | Postcard of Fort Wellington, ca. 1930 |
| Fort William | 1803 (established) | 1923 | Thunder Bay; 48°20′34″N 89°21′30″W | Important North West Company post, now serving as a reconstructed living history site | View of Fort William reconstructed buildings |
| Fort York | 1793 (established), 1815 (current fort completed) | 1923 | Toronto; 43°38′20.50″N 79°24′12″W | The birthplace of the settlement that would become Toronto and the primary defence for (what was then) York, Upper Canada, the Fort now serves as a museum containing the largest collection of War of 1812 buildings in Canada and many of the oldest buildings in Toronto | Aerial view of Fort York |
| François Bâby House | 1812 (completed) | 1950 | Windsor; 42°19′6.6″N 83°2′32.64″W | During the War of 1812, American forces crossed the Detroit River and used the house as headquarters for their invasion; when the Americans retreated one month later, the Bâby House was occupied by British forces under Major-General Isaac Brock, who built an artillery battery on the property and used it to open fire on Fort Detroit | Exterior photo of the François Bâby House as seen from above |
| Fulford Place | 1901 (completed) | 1992 | Brockville; 44°35′50.24″N 75°40′14.97″W | An excellent intact example of the type of mansion erected by wealthy Canadians in the late 19th and early 20th centuries, with the general layout of the site remaining as it was originally laid out by the Olmsted Brothers | Exterior view of the west facade of Fulford Place |
| Gillies Grove and House | 1937 (completed) | 1993 | Arnprior; 45°26′41.96″N 76°21′32.22″W | House associated with two of the most prominent forest industry families in the Ottawa Valley, the McLachlins and the Gillies; surrounded by one of the few remaining accessible woodlots containing significant stands of old growth Ottawa Valley White Pine | |
| George Brown House National Historic Site | 1877 (completed) | 1976-11-06 | | | |
| Glanmore / Phillips-Faulkner House | 1883 (completed) | 1969 | Belleville; 44°10′1.11″N 77°22′3.13″W | House designed by architect Thomas Hanley for J.P.C Phillips, a wealthy Belleville banker and financier; an excellent representative example of the Second Empire style popular among the upper middle class in late 19th-century Canada | Glanmore/Phillips-Faulkner House NHS, Belleville, ON |
| Glengarry Cairn | 1842 (completed) | 1921 | South Glengarry; 45°7′18.19″N 74°29′23.33″W | Large cairn erected by the Glengarry militia to commemorate the services of Sir John Colborne, commander-in-chief of the armed forces during the Upper Canada Rebellion | Glengarry Cairn NHS, Cairn Island, ON |
| Glengarry House | 1792 (completed) | 1921 | Cornwall; 45°2′22″N 74°37′8.75″W | The ruins of the residence of Lieutenant Colonel John Macdonell, a pioneer in the settlement of Ontario, first Speaker of the Legislative Assembly of Upper Canada, and a hero of the Battle of Queenston Heights | |
| Glengarry Landing | 1814 (flotilla construction) | 1923 | Edenvale; 44°27′6.58″N 79°54′0.24″W | Site at the junction of the Nottawasaga River and Marl Creek, where in 1814 the Glengarry Light Infantry Fencibles, under the command of Lieutenant-Colonel Robert McDouall, constructed a flotilla of boats to relieve the British garrison at Fort Michilimackinac and to effect the subsequent capture of Prairie du Chien during the War of 1812 | Stone cairn marking location of Glengarry Landing |
| Guelph City Hall | 1857 (completed) | 1984 | Guelph; 43°32′38.7″N 80°14′51.9″W | A two-storey, limestone building built in the Renaissance Revival style, it is an excellent example of a multi-functional city hall, which contained the market, fire hall, police office and jail, library, a reading room, a large public hall, along with town offices and a council chamber; symbolic of Guelph's mid-19th-century confidence following the arrival of the Grand Trunk Railway in the community | Exterior view of Guelph City Hall |
| Hamilton and Scourge | 1813 (sinking) | 1976 | Lake Ontario (11 kilometres (6.8 mi) north of St. Catharines); 43°17′46.32″N 79°17′52.6″W | The USS Hamilton and USS Scourge were two merchant schooners pressed into service by the Americans in the War of 1812, both of which capsized and sank in a sudden squall; the ships are in remarkable condition at the underwater wreckage site and are rare examples of surviving War of 1812 vessels | Sketch of the USS Scourge |
| His Majesty's / St. Paul's Chapel of the Mohawks | 1785 (completed) | 1981 | Brantford; 43°7′28.01″N 80°14′5.84″W | The first Protestant church in Upper Canada, now the oldest surviving church in Ontario, and one of only two Royal Chapels in Canada; symbolic of the important role played by the Loyalist Mohawks in the development of the province | Exterior view of the Mohawk Chapel |
| Hillary House | 1862 (completed) | 1973 | Aurora; 44°0′10.09″N 79°28′7.06″W | Now operating as the Koffler Museum of Medicine, an excellent example of a Picturesque house in the Gothic Revival style | Hillary House NHS, Aurora, ON |
| Homer Watson House / Doon School of Fine Arts | 1834 (completed) | 1980 | Kitchener; 43°23′41.52″N 80°25′6.58″W | Once the home and studio of Canadian landscape artist Homer Watson; some of Watson's most well-known works are views of the surrounding countryside from various vantage points on this property | Front facade of the Homer Watson House |
| Homewood | 1801 (completed) | 1982 | Augusta; 44°37′59.55″N 75°37′0.73″W | A two-storey fieldstone residence built for Dr. Solomon Jones, a prominent Loyalist; the house reflects the lifestyle of a prominent rural professional in the early 19th century and its design uniquely melds the Palladian style and the rural architectural traditions of nearby Quebec | Exterior view of Homewood |
| Huron County Gaol | 1841 (completed) | 1973 | Goderich; 43°44′58.83″N 81°42′29.82″W | A distinctive octagonal jail design in the Panopticon style of prison construction | Exterior view of the Huron County Gaol |
| Inverarden House | 1823 (completed) | 1968 | Cornwall; 45°1′52.77″N 74°40′15.86″W | Built for retired North West Company partner John MacDonald of Garth, the manor house is an excellent early example of Regency architecture in Canada | Inverarden House NHS, Cornwall, ON |
| Joseph Schneider Haus | 1816 (completed) | 1999 | Kitchener; 43°26′41.35″N 80°29′40.66″W | A house museum associated with the migration of German Mennonites from Lancaster County, Pennsylvania to Waterloo County in the early 19th century, and illustrative of the typical Mennonite house plan from the period | Joseph Schneider Haus NHS, Kitchener, ON |
| Kay-Nah-Chi-Wah-Nung (Rainy River Mounds) | 3000 BCE (ca.) | 1969 | Morley; 48°38.816′N 94°05.641′W | One of the most significant centres of early habitation and ceremonial burial in Canada, with evidence of 5,000 years of human habitation, including burial mounds from the Laurel and Blackduck cultures; a cultural and historic focal point for the Rainy Lake and River Bands of Saulteaux | |
| Lansdowne Iron Works | 1801 (established) | 1932 | Leeds and the Thousand Islands; 44°32′57.58″N 76°7′33.7″W | The first ironworks in Upper Canada, destroyed by fire after a decade in operation | |
| Leaskdale Manse | 1886 (completed) | 1996 | Leaskdale; 44°12′11.15″N 79°9′37.56″W | The home of Lucy Maud Montgomery when she wrote 11 of the 22 works published during her lifetime; the house and its immediate area figure prominently in her posthumously published journals | Exterior view of Leaskdale Manse |
| Leeds and Grenville County Court House | 1844 (completed) | 1966 | Brockville; 44°35′27.11″N 75°41′8.69″W | A landmark building set on a hill at the top of the historic Brockville town square; one of the most grandiose district courthouses built in Upper Canada | View of the Isaac Brock bust in front of the Leeds and Grenville County Court House |
| Lynnwood / Campbell-Reid House | 1851 (completed) | 1972 | Simcoe; 42°50′16.43″N 80°18′11.96″W | Excellent example of a modestly-sized house in the Neoclassical style; located on a rise overlooking the Lynn River | Lynnwood/Campbell-Reid House NHS, Simcoe, ON |
| Macdonell-Williamson House | 1819 (completed) | 1969 | East Hawkesbury; 45°33′49.06″N 74°22′59.72″W | A stone house built on the banks of the Ottawa River as a retirement home for former North West Company partner John Macdonell | Exterior view of Macdonell-Williamson House |
| Matheson House | 1840 (completed) | 1966 | Perth; 44°54′3.92″N 76°15′2.39″W | Built for Roderick Matheson, a local merchant and politician, the house is a good example of an affluent, pre-Confederation residence; it occupies a key position in one of the best surviving historic streetscapes in Canada, and now serves as the Perth Museum | Exterior view of Matheson House from the street |
| Mazinaw Pictographs | | 1982 | Bon Echo Provincial Park; 44°54′2.06″N 77°12′23.12″W | The largest rock art site on the southern Canadian Shield and the only major pictograph site in Southern Ontario | View of pictographs on Mazinaw Rock |
| McCrae House | 1858 (ca.) (completed) | 1966 | Guelph; 43°32′9.7″N 80°14′42.1″W | The birthplace of John McCrae, the author of In Flanders Fields | Exterior view of McCrae House and gardens |
| McMartin House | 1830 (completed) | 1972 | Perth; 44°53′52.13″N 76°14′48.99″W | Built for Daniel McMartin, a member of Upper Canada's Tory Loyalist elite; an example of American federal architecture that was elaborate for the time and place of construction | Exterior view of McMartin House |
| Merrickville Blockhouse * | 1833 (completed) | 1939 | Merrickville–Wolford; 44°55′0.54″N 75°50′16.03″W | A relatively large, British-designed blockhouse, considered an excellent example of the structures erected for the defence of the Rideau Canal in the 19th-century | Exterior view of the Merrickville Blockhouse |
| Middleport Site | | 1953 | Six Nations of the Grand River First Nation; 43°5′54.01″N 80°4′4.18″W | Archaeological site related to the Middle Ontario Iroquoians | Middleport Site NHS, Middleport, ON |
| Middlesex County Court House | 1829 (completed) | 1955 | London; 42°58′55.59″N 81°15′15.65″W | A very early and nationally significant example of the Gothic Revival style in Canada; associated with the early government of the province, as the site of the building was proposed by John Graves Simcoe for the provincial capital | Exterior view of the Middlesex County Court House |
| Mission of St. Ignace II | 1649 (attack) | 1955 | Tay; 44°43′9.8″N 79°43′4.72″W | Destruction of Saint Ignace II and nearby Saint-Louis sealed the fate of the Wendat Confederacy, leading to the abandonment of their traditional homeland | Altar at Mission of St. Ignace II |
| Mnjikaning Fish Weirs | 3300 BCE (ca.) | 1982 | Ramara; 44°36′15.63″N 79°22′10.6″W | The site of the largest and best preserved wooden fish weirs known in eastern North America, in use from about 3300 B.C. until the recent past | Mnjikaning Fish Weirs |
| Moose Factory Buildings | 1673 (established) | 1957 | Moose Factory; 51°16′43.21″N 80°38′21.5″W | 19th-century buildings associated with the second Hudson's Bay Company post in Canada; after the 1821 merger with the North West Company, Moose Factory became the supply point for posts inland as far as Lake Timiskaming | Former Hudson's Bay Company staff house in Moose Factory, Ontario, Canada, now a museum and tourism office |
| Nanticoke | 1813 (battle) | 1924 | Nanticoke; 42°47′51.38″N 80°3′12.02″W | The site where the Norfolk volunteer militia routed a band of American marauders who had been pillaging area farms and terrorizing the country, an exploit that inspired the British military forces and the people of Upper Canada during the War of 1812; now the location of the Nanticoke Generating Station | Nanticoke NHS, Nanticoke, ON |
| Napanee Town Hall | 1856 (completed) | 1984 | Greater Napanee; 44°14′54.92″N 76°57′2.48″W | An early Ontario example of a combination town hall and market, and a rare extant example in Canada of a town hall in the Greek Revival style; symbolic of the development of local government in Ontario in the 19th century | Exterior view of Napanee Town Hall |
| Nazrey African Methodist Episcopal Church | 1848 (completed) | 1999 | Amherstburg; 42°6′4.89″N 83°6′21.65″W | A simple fieldstone chapel, now part of the North American Black Historical Museum complex; it has an important association with Bishop Willis Nazery, the first leader of a wholly Canadian denomination (the British Methodist Episcopal Church) founded by Underground Railroad refugees | Nazrey African Methodist Episcopal Church NHS, Amherstburg, ON |
| Normandale Furnace | 1818 (commenced operations) | 1927 | Normandale; 42°42.585′N 80°18.593′W | The site of an early 19th-century Ontario iron smelter | Normandale Furnace NHS, Normandale, ON |
| Old Hay Bay Church | 1792 (completed) | 2001 | Greater Napanee; 44°6′11.45″N 77°1′1.33″W | Built by United Empire Loyalist settlers, it is the oldest surviving Methodist building in Canada and is associated with the role played by Methodists in Upper Canada’s early development; a significant element of the history of the United Church of Canada | Exterior view of the Old Hay Bay Church with Canada flag and plaque out front |
| Old Stone Church | 1853 (completed) | 1991 | Beaverton; 44°25′34.63″N 79°6′57.15″W | A small rural fieldstone church; a particularly good example of the few early stone vernacular churches surviving in Canada | Old Stone Church NHS, Beaverton, ON |
| Old Stone Mill | 1810 (completed) | 1970 | Delta; 44°36′36.74″N 76°7′20.57″W | A three-storey stone gristmill which played an important role in the settlement and economic development of Leeds County; one of the oldest surviving mills in Ontario | Exterior view of the Old Stone Mill |
| Old Woodstock Town Hall | 1853 (completed) | 1955 | Woodstock; 43°7′45.77″N 80°45′26.9″W | A two-storey, buff-brick, Italianate-style town hall building; an excellent example of a Canadian colonial adaptation of a British town hall | Exterior view of the Old Woodstock Town Hall |
| Oro African Methodist Episcopal Church | 1849 (completed) | 2000 | Edgar; 44°30′9.68″N 79°38′10.87″W | A log church with an unmarked cemetery; the last built remnant of a community of Black Canadians with United Empire Loyalist roots | Exterior view of the church |
| Ossossane Sites | | 1982 | Ossossane Beach; 44°40′56.37″N 79°57′4.51″W | Archaeological site of the principal village of Bear Clan of the Wendat (Hurons) | |
| Our Lady of the Immaculate Conception | 1888 (completed) | 1990 | Guelph; 43°32′34.78″N 80°15′5.87″W | Influenced by the medieval cathedrals of France, the church on a hill is an exceptional example of the Victorian High Gothic style in Canadian architecture | Exterior view of the church in May |
| Oxford-on-Rideau Township Hall | 1875 (completed) | 1984 | Oxford Mills; 44°57′45.35″N 75°40′43.16″W | A two-storey stone building with a cupola, this small town hall is representative of early local government in Canada | |
| Park House | 1796 (built) | 2018 | Amherstburg; 42.103659°N 83.113490°W | Considered one of the oldest houses in the Amherstburg region, Park House is a rare example of a once-common colonial building type found in settlements and fur-trading posts across colonial North America. Through its architecture, Park House tells the story of the traders and artisans who populated the Windsor region. | Frontal view of the Park House |
| Parkhill | 8000 BCE (ca.) | 1982 | Parkhill; 43°9′33″N 81°42′28″W | The first major Palaeo-Indian habitation site reported in Ontario, consisting of concentrations of stone artifactual material distributed over 6 hectares (15 acres) | |
| Parkwood | 1940 (completed) | 1989 | Oshawa; 43°54′11.95″N 78°52′6.48″W | A residential estate developed between 1915 and 1940 by Canadian industrialist Samuel McLaughlin; among the finest and most intact surviving examples of Canadian architectural and landscape design, featuring the work of Pearson and Darling, Frances Loring, John M. Lyle, Florence Wyle and others | Exterior view of house at Parkwood Estate |
| Penman Textile Mill | 1874 (completed) | 1989 | Paris; 43°11′51.28″N 80°23′22.86″W | The first and most important plant of the largest knitting firm in Canada, the Penman Manufacturing Company | Winter scene of the Penman mill in Paris, circa 1900 |
| Perth Town Hall | 1864 (completed) | 1984 | Perth; 44°53′56.86″N 76°14′55.98″W | A two-storey stone building topped by a layered cupola with clock, symbolic of the role and importance of local government in the 19th century | Exterior view of Perth Town Hall |
| Peterborough Drill Hall / Armoury | 1909 (completed) | 1989 | Peterborough; 44°18′31.16″N 78°19′20.26″W | Built in the Romanesque Revival style, the armoury is representative of the third phase of drill hall construction in Canada (1896–1918); one of the largest and best designed examples from the 1907-1909 period | A detail of the exterior of the Peterborough armoury |
| Peterborough Lift Lock | 1904 (completed) | 1979 | Peterborough; 44°18′27.65″N 78°18′1.04″W | A large boat lift along the Trent-Severn Waterway designed to lift boats 19.8 metres (65 ft); it is the highest hydraulic lift lock in the world, and at the time of its construction was an engineering achievement of national and international renown | View of the Peterborough Lift Lock in 2012 |
| Peterborough Petroglyphs | 900 to 1400 (ca.) | 1981 | Otonabee-South Monaghan; 44°36′48.4″N 78°2′38.86″W | An outcrop of exposed marble inscribed with hundreds of realistic human and animal forms, as well as numerous abstract and symbolic images; one of the largest known concentrations of pre-contact petroglyphs in Canada | Cast of some of the petroglyphs |
| Pic River Site | | 1981 | Pic River; 48°37′34.78″N 86°17′5.66″W | A site comprising four archaeological nodes: the Pic River site, Fort Pic, the Heron Bay site, and the Duncan site, which together represent numerous Aboriginal and European occupations dating from 12000 BCE to the late 19th century | |
| Point Clark Lighthouse | 1859 (completed) | 1966 | Point Clark; 44°4′22.28″N 81°45′26.37″W | One of six Imperial Towers on Lake Huron; noted for its distinctive lantern and the quality of its architecture | Exterior view of Point Clark Lighthouse |
| Pointe au Baril | | 1923 | Maitland; 44°38.255′N 75°36.575′W | The "Iroquoise" and "Outaouaise", the last two French warships that navigated Lake Ontario, were built on this point | The Outaouaise being captured by the British in 1760 near Pointe au Baril |
| Port Hope Capitol Theatre | 1930 | 2016 | Port Hope; 43.950798°N 78.293215°W | Rare and outstanding "atmospheric" theatre of the 1920s, among the first to present "talkies" | The Capitol Theatre exterior, Port Hope |
| Port Stanley | 1669 (first European contact) | 1923 | Port Stanley; 42°39′56.99″N 81°12′43.01″W | An important landing point for a succession of explorers and travellers of the 17th and 18th centuries, marked by a cairn commemorating events including the landing of Adrien Jolliet in 1669 (during the first descent of the Great Lakes by Europeans) and the encampment by Isaac Brock and his troops in the War of 1812 | Federal cairn marking Port Stanley NHS, Port Stanley, ON |
| Port Talbot | 1803 (established) | 1923 | Port Talbot; 42°38.403′N 81°21.969′W | Founded in 1803 by Thomas Talbot, the settlement was one of the most prosperous of its time in Upper Canada, noted for its good roads, with Talbot keeping out land speculators and securing hard-working settlers; Talbot's authoritarian control of the settlers led to his downfall at the hands of colonial authorities | Portrait of Thomas Talbot |
| Prescott Railway Station (Grand Trunk) | 1855 (completed) | 1973 | Prescott; 44°42′39.66″N 75°31′28.6″W | A small, stone train station, typical of the smaller stations erected for the Grand Trunk Railway during the first construction period of the GTR line between Montreal and Brockville | The railway station in 1905 |
| Rideau Canal * | 1832 (completed) | 1925 | Ottawa to Kingston; 45°25′33″N 75°41′50″W | Built for the British government by Lieutenant-Colonel John By as a defensive work in the event of war with the United States, the canal is the best preserved example of a 19th-century slack water canal in North America, with most of its original structures intact | View of the canal locks at Jones Falls |
| Ridout Street Complex | 1838 to 1870 (period of construction) | 1966 | London; 42°59′1.27″N 81°15′17.46″W | Comprising three mid-19th-century residential and commercial buildings, the grouping is representative of the appearance of Ontario cities in that period and of London's early residential and commercial architecture | Ridout Street Complex NHS, London, ON |
| Rosamond Woollen Mill | 1866 (established) | 1986 | Almonte; 45°13′41.17″N 76°12′1.32″W | At one time one of the largest mills in Canada, it is characteristic of late 19th-century textile mills in Canada | Main mill after reconstruction |
| Royal Flying Corps Hangars | 1917 (completed) | 1989 | Essa; 44°16′8.14″N 79°53′18.45″W | Eight surviving First World War hangars at CFB Borden which played a significant role in the development of military aviation in Canada | |
| Ruin of St. Raphael's Roman Catholic Church | 1821 (main church completed) | 1996 | South Glengarry; 45°12′42.19″N 74°35′49.34″W | St. Raphael's roof, tower and interior decoration were destroyed by fire in 1970, but the ruins were preserved; one of the earliest surviving Roman Catholic monuments in English-speaking Canada | View of the St. Raphael's ruins and surrounding gravestones |
| Ruthven Park | 1846 (completed) | 1995 | Cayuga; 42°58′45.4″N 79°52′30.32″W | An estate with a Greek Revival villa, laid out by David Thompson; associated with the transformation of Upper Canada from a "settler" to a "settled" society | Ruthven Park NHS, Cayuga, ON |
| Saint-Louis Mission | 1649 (attack) | 1920 | Victoria Harbour; 44°43′44.75″N 79°46′52.62″W | A 2-hectare (4.9-acre) archaeological site, once the site of a stockaded Wendat (Huron) village and nearby Jesuit mission; a Haudenosaunee attack in 1649 led to a chain of events resulting in the abandonment of Huronia by the Wendat in 1650 | Image of a 1632 tract on the Wendat in Huronia prior to the events of 1649 |
| Sainte-Marie Among the Hurons Mission | 1639 (established) | 1920 | Midland; 44°44′3.71″N 79°50′43.51″W | The reconstructed main Jesuit mission to the Wendat (Huron); over ten years, it grew into a sizeable colony, but was abandoned in 1649 due to disease and conflict | View of a vegetable garden, buildings and stockades at the reconstructed Sainte-Marie Among the Hurons Mission |
| Sandwich First Baptist Church | 1851 (completed) | 1999 | Windsor; 42°17′30.47″N 83°4′48.92″W | One of the oldest Baptist churches surviving from this period in Ontario; representative of the churches in border settlements built to accommodate the communities created by Underground Railroad refugees | External view of Sandwich First Baptist Church |
| Sault Ste. Marie Canal | 1895 (completed) | 1987 | Sault Ste. Marie; 46°30′46″N 84°21′05″W | Now operated as a recreational facility, the canal and associated works were a significant part of Canada's national canal system at the time of their construction; the first electrically-powered lock in the world | Exterior view of the Sault Ste. Marie Canal |
| Serpent Mounds | 50 BCE to 300 CE (ca.) | 1982 | Keene; 44°12′40″N 78°09′25″W | A grouping of six separate burial mounds forming a serpentine shape approximately 60 metres (200 ft) long; the only one of its kind in Canada | Serpent Mounds NHS, Keene, ON |
| Sharon Temple | 1831 (completed) | 1990 | Sharon; 44°6′4.8″N 79°26′30.75″W | A temple built by the Children of Peace, a schismatic Quaker sect, and its design and aesthetics embody the values of the group; acquired by a local historic group in 1917, and is representative of the early heritage conservation movement in Canada | Exterior view of the Sharon Temple |
| Sheguiandah | 11,000 BCE (ca.) (first occupation) | 1954 | Manitoulin District; 45°52′40.69″N 81°54′4.12″W | An archaeological site on Manitoulin Island where successive aboriginal peoples quarried quartzite, leaving behind artifacts spanning approximately 10,000 years of occupation | |
| Sir John Johnson House | 1792 (original core completed) | 1961 | Williamstown; 45°8′41.05″N 74°34′46.11″W | A wooden house of typical 19th-century Ontario vernacular design; associated with noted Loyalist Sir John Johnson, 2nd Baronet | John Johnson's Manor House |
| Smiths Falls Bascule Bridge | 1913 (completed) | 1983 | Smiths Falls; 44°53′49.97″N 76°1′37.39″W | A bascule bridge over the Rideau Canal; an early example of distinctive design in movable bridges, it is the oldest surviving structure of its type | Bascule railway bridge |
| Smiths Falls Railway Station (Canadian Northern) | 1914 (completed) | 1983 | Smiths Falls; 44°53′57.08″N 76°1′39.75″W | Now serving as the Smiths Falls Railway Museum, the station's distinctive turret, polygonal waiting room and substantial construction were a departure from the usual practice of building cheaply from standard plans; representative of Canadian Northern Railway's efforts to compete directly with the Canadian Pacific Railway | Exterior view of the Smith Falls Railway Station in winter |
| Southwold Earthworks | 1500 (ca.)(occupation) | 1923 | Iona; 42°40.459′N 81°21.63544′W | Rare and well-preserved archaeological remains of an Attawandaron fortified village | View of mounds and trees at the Southwold Earthworks |
| St. Jude's Anglican Church | 1871 (completed) | 1993 | Brantford; 43°8′23.54″N 80°15′12.57″W | A small 1871 church in the High Victorian Gothic Revival style; known for its striking interior murals, painted in 1936, influenced by the Arts and Crafts Movement and the work of William Morris | St. Jude's Anglican Church NHS, Brantford, ON |
| St. Marys Junction Railway Station (Grand Trunk) | 1858 (completed) | 1973 | St. Marys Junction; 43°16′18.56″N 81°7′52.53″W | A one-storey limestone building in the Italianate style which served for a time as the western terminus of the Grand Trunk Railway; representative of the Grand Trunk's original Ontario stations, and a rare surviving stone example | View of the St. Marys Junction Railway Station and adjacent tracks |
| St. Thomas City Hall | 1899 (completed) | 1984 | St. Thomas; 42°46′44.75″N 81°11′33.8″W | A well-designed late Victorian civic building with a commanding clock tower, reflective of the tremendous growth of the city at the end of the 19th century; one of the few surviving unaltered Richardsonian Romanesque town halls in Canada | View of the St. Thomas City Hall at night |
| Stephen Leacock Museum / Old Brewery Bay | 1928 (completed) | 1992 | Orillia; 44°36′29.73″N 79°23′38.32″W | A two-storey house on a four 4-hectare (9.9-acre) property on the shores of Lake Couchiching; home of and inspiration to Stephen Leacock, one of Canada's most celebrated authors and humorists | View of Stephen Leacock House |
| Stratford City Hall | 1899 (completed) | 1976 | Stratford; 43°22′11.99″N 80°58′55.88″W | A monumental red brick city hall with a prominent clock tower; a noted late 19th-century Picturesque municipal building, representative of an era when growing cities sought to express their civic pride and ambition in impressive civic buildings | View of Stratford City Hall |
| Thistle Ha' Farm | 1852 (livestock operation began) | 1973 | Claremont; 43°56′23.04″N 79°6′32.9″W | An 80-hectare (200-acre) working farm where groundbreaking breeding of pedigree livestock in Canada occurred in the 19th century; the work undertaken here played an important role in improving stock breeding throughout the Americas | alt |
| Thunder Bay Tourist Pagoda | 1909 (completed) | 1986 | Thunder Bay; 48°26′4.46″N 89°13′4.98″W | An octagonal brick tourism bureau featuring a pagoda-shaped roof with cupola, surrounded by a verandah and with an entrance surmounted by a carved beaver; symbolic of civic boosterism and novelty architecture | View of Thunder Bay Tourist Pagoda and surrounding buildings |
| Trent–Severn Waterway | 1830 (commenced) - 1920 (completed) | 1929 | Trenton; 44°7′14.97″N 77°35′29.11″W to Port Severn; 44°48′13.32″N 79°43′14.53″W | A 386-kilometre (240 mi) natural and man-made waterway that links Georgian Bay to the Bay of Quinte; an important transportation route noted for the high number of surviving unmodified structures in some sections dating from the waterway's construction | Trent-Severn Gateway |
| Victoria Hall / Cobourg Town Hall | 1860 (completed) | 1959 | Cobourg; 43°57′33.88″N 78°10′4.11″W | A neoclassical three-storey civic building; one of the more extravagant examples of town halls constructed in Canada West after landmark municipal legislation in 1848, symbolic of the prosperity and optimism of Cobourg during the 1850s | Victoria Hall Cobourg |
| Victoria Hall / Petrolia Town Hall | 1889 (completed) | 1975 | Petrolia; 42°52′52.31″N 82°8′48.57″W | A buff brick town hall with prominent clock tower, reflective of the time in the 1880s when Petrolia was among the wealthiest towns in Canada due to the local oil boom | View of Petrolia Town Hall |
| Walker Site | | 1982 | Onondaga; 43°7′0″N 80°7′0″W | Large Iroquoian archaeological site pertaining to the historic Attiwandaronk tribe | Walker Site NHS, Onondaga, ON |
| Wellington County House of Industry and Refuge | 1877 (completed) | 1995 | Fergus; 43°41′35.06″N 80°23′59.18″W | A former farm dominated by a two-storey Italianate-style stone building; oldest known state-supported poorhouse or almshouse in Canada, now serving as the county museum and archives | View of the Wellington County Museum |
| Whitefish Island | 300 BCE (ca.) (first Aboriginal encampments) | 1981 | Sault Ste. Marie; 46°30′39.6″N 84°21′14.4″W | A small, naturalized island that was occupied by eight successive cultures, culminating in the development of the Ojibwa nation; its location made it a focal point of pre-contact trade and settlement | Aerial view of the St. Marys River; Whitefish Island is just to the left of the rapids |
| Wilberforce Red Cross Outpost | 1916 (completed); 1922-57 (health centre operational) | 2003 | Wilberforce; 45°2′20.06″N 78°13′24.92″W | A simple frame house that served as the first outpost of the Ontario Division of the Canadian Red Cross; dedicated women provided nurse care with minimal medical backup, facilities and equipment, and the site is representative of the key role of nurses in providing health care and education in isolated areas | |
| Wintering Site | 1669–70 (event) | 1919 | Port Dover; 42°47′40.65″N 80°11′21.6″W | Explorers François Dollier de Casson and René de Bréhant de Galinée and seven other Frenchmen wintered at this site - the first Europeans known to have ascended the Great Lakes to Sault Ste. Marie | Wintering Site NHS, Port Dover, ON |
| Wolfe Island Township Hall | 1859 (completed) | 1984 | Wolfe Island; 44°11′35.24″N 76°26′26.88″W | A small Italianate rural town hall; an unusually sophisticated example of its type | Black and white photograph of band members in uniform on front steps of stone township hall in 1894 |
| Wolseley Barracks | 1888 (completed) | 1963 | London; 43°0′0.5″N 81°14′2.03″W | The first purpose-built infantry training school erected by the federal government, originally used to house Company "D" of the Infantry School Corps of The Royal Canadian Regiment; an important early step in the development of a permanent military force in Canada following the withdrawal of regular British troops from Canada in 1871 | |
| Woodside | 1853 (completed) | 1952 | Kitchener; 43°27′48.88″N 80°28′50.6″W | A one-and-a-half-storey house on a wooded estate which served as the childhood home of William Lyon Mackenzie King, the longest-serving prime minister of Canada; the subject of many of King's writings in adult life | A view of a lane and the house at Woodside |

== See also ==
- History of Ontario
- List of historic places in Ontario
- Ontario Heritage Act, legislation under which heritage sites of provincial or municipal significance are designated
