= Laurel complex =

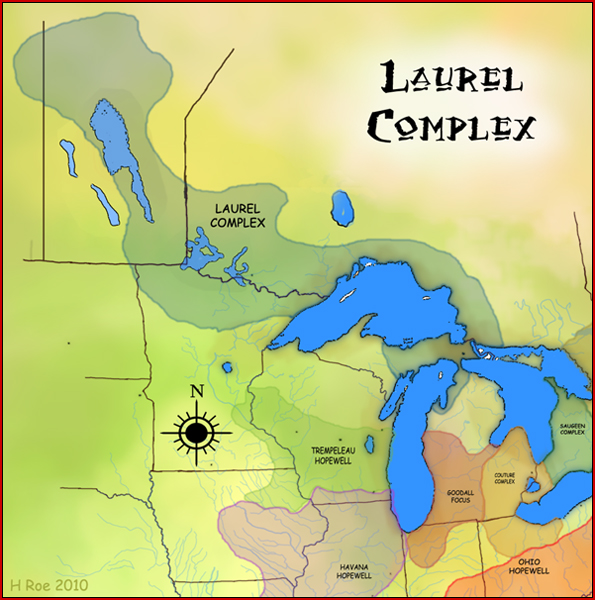
- The Laurel complex and other cultures in the Hopewellian sphere
- Geographical range: Upper Midwest, central Canada
- Period: Woodland
- Followed by: Blackduck tradition
- Defined by: Lloyd Wilford

The Laurel complex or Laurel tradition is an archaeological culture which was present in what is now southern Quebec, southern and northwestern Ontario and east-central Manitoba in Canada, and northern Michigan, northwestern Wisconsin, and northern Minnesota in the United States. They were the first pottery using people of Ontario north of the Trent–Severn Waterway. The complex is named after the former unincorporated community of Laurel, Minnesota. It was first defined by Lloyd Wilford in 1941.

== Hopewell Interaction Sphere ==
The Hopewell Exchange system began in the Ohio and Illinois River Valleys about 300 BCE. The culture is referred to more as a system of interaction among a variety of societies than as a single society or culture. Hopewell trading networks were quite extensive, with obsidian from the Yellowstone area, copper from Lake Superior, and shells from the Gulf Coast.

The construction of ceremonial mounds was an important feature of the Laurel complex, as it was for the Point Peninsula complex and other Hopewell cultures. Sites were usually located at rapids or falls where sturgeon come to spawn and ceremonies may have coincided with this yearly event. The mounds and the artifacts contained within them indicate contact with the Adena and Hopewell of the Ohio River valley. It is unknown if the contact was direct or indirect.

=== Kay-Nah-Chi-Wah-Nung ===
The first mound-builders in what is now the Kay-Nah-Chi-Wah-Nung National Historic Site of Canada, Laurel culture (c.2300 BP - 900 BP) who lived "in villages and built large round burial mounds along the edge of the river, as monuments to their dead." These mounds remain visible today. Kay-Nah-Chi-Wah-Nung is considered to be one of the "most significant centres of early habitation and ceremonial burial in Canada," is located on the north side Rainy River in Northwestern Ontario, Canada. It became part of a continent-wide trading network because of its strategic location at the centre of major North American waterways.

== Blackduck tradition ==
The later Blackduck tradition has been framed as a successor culture in the region, with the archaeologist K. C. A. Dawson positioning the Blackduck as a new, unrelated population which spread northward through northern Minnesota, southern Manitoba, and northwestern Ontario c. AD 500 to AD 900. Blackduck ceramics were notably better-constructed than Woodland period predecessors, with thinner walls and larger size. It was noted by Dawson that at the Wabinosh River site north of Lake Superior, late Laurel ceramics display some traits of the Blackduck and Selkirk traditions. Dawson associates the Laurel with an Archaic period residual population, with an influx of Blackduck people as the climate in the north became milder; he associates the Blackduck with the Ojibwe.

== See also ==
- Hopewell tradition
- List of Hopewell sites
- Saugeen complex
- Point Peninsula complex
