= Fort Norfolk =

Fort Norfolk may refer to:

- Fort Norfolk (Ontario)
- Fort Norfolk (Virginia)
  - EVMC/Fort Norfolk station in Norfolk, Virginia
