= Battle of Kingston Harbour =

War of 1812 battle

- Part of War of 1812
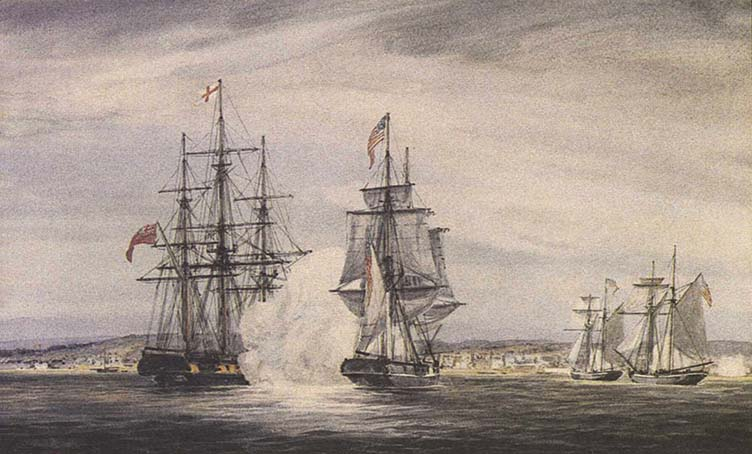
- Engagement of the Oneida and Royal George in Kingston harbour.
Date	November 10, 1812
Location	Kingston Harbour, Kingston, Upper Canada
Result	Inconclusive

Belligerents
United Kingdom; Upper Canada	United States

Commanders and leaders
Cmdr. Hugh Earle; Lt-Col. John Vincent	Cmdr. Isaac Chauncey

Units involved
HMS Royal George; 1st Frontenac Militia; 1st Lennox Militia; 1st Addington Militia; Royal Newfoundland Fencibles; 49th Regiment of Foot; 10th Royal Veterans	USS Oneida; USS Pert; USS Growler; USS Julia; USS Conquest; USS Hamilton; USS Governor Tompkins

Strength
1,000+	500+

Casualties and losses
1 killed 8+ wounded	2 killed 7+ wounded

The Battle of Kingston Harbour, was a naval battle of the War of 1812 fought on November 10th, 1812 between American and British naval forces in Kingston harbour, as well as Canadian militia from Kingston.

It was the only time the British stronghold at Kingston was attacked during the war, and the only time that shots were ever fired from Fort Henry.

== Background ==
Throughout the summer and autumn of 1812, American and British forces on Lake Ontario conducted small scale raids and attacks, focussing on the main American stronghold at Sackets Harbor. The Americans had planned to attack their British counterpart at Kingston.

On November 9, the USS Oneida, under command of Commodore Isaac Chauncey, with a squadron of six ships, sailed from Sackets Harbor to intercept British ships conveying supplies to the army stores at Kingston. The sloop HMS Royal George, under Commodore Hugh Earle, was sighted and chased into the Bay of Quinte.

An American sailor, Ned Myers, later recounted:

“we made such a show of schooners, that though [the Royal George] had herself a vessel or two in company, she did not choose to wait for us.”

Chauncey followed Royal George into the bay but lost sight on her as darkness fell. Earle knew the waters well and slipped past Chauncey’s squadron and headed for the safety of Kingston harbour, arriving around 2am. The Americans anchored in the Bay of Quinte until early on the morning of November 10.

As soon as he arrived in Kingston, Earle met with Col. John Vincent, the army commander at Kingston, and told him of Chauncey’s squadron and their possible attack on Kingston. The British garrison was put on alert and the militias from the surrounding area were called to muster and gathered in the town. One witness recalled:

In a moment every person was under arms, detachments were sent to the different bridges over Cataraqui creek, each attended by a field piece, and every other necessary precaution taken with the greatest alertness.”

Companies from the 1st Frontenac Militia, 1st Lennox Militia, and 1st Addington Militia mustered and marched to the town, some arriving without arms and requiring weapons and ammunition from the town stores.

The Kingston Garrison of regular soldiers consisted of 200 men from the 49th Regiment of Foot, 100 men from the 10th Royal Veterans, and 100 men from the Royal Newfoundland Fencibles, who were detached to serve as marines aboard the Royal George and other ships.

== Battle ==
At sunrise on November 10, Chauncey’s squadron weighed anchor and sailed along the Canadian shore in search of the Royal George. Passing by Ernestown, now Bath, Chauncey spotted a merchant schooner and sent a boat to seize it. The Americans threaten to attack the town if the residents did not hand over the ship, and the schooner was soon captured and taken with the squadron. Slowed by the captured schooner, Chauncey ordered her burned, and Lt. Joseph Macpherson set fire to the vessel between Ernestown and Collins Bay.

Around 1pm, as the Americans reached Collins Bay, they spotted the Royal George anchored in Kingston harbour, protected by the militia shore batteries in Kingston. While the militia and army in Kingston believed the Americans to be an invasion force, Chauncey’s main goal was the destruction of the Royal George, and Myers recalled:

we ran down into the bay, and engaged the ship and batteries, as close as we could well get.”

Ineffective fire from a British gunboat in Collin’s Bay greeted the American squadron as they neared Kingston, which was returned without effect by the Americans. A brass 6-pdr artillery piece, manned on Everett Point by Addington Militia, five miles west of Kingston, was next to try and inflict some damage on the lead schooner USS Conquest, under the command of Lieutenant Jesse Elliot.

As Chauncey’s fleet passed Everett Point and bore down on the Royal George’s position in the harbour, Commodore Earle weighed anchor and pulled back in line with the shore batteries, closer to the Cataraqui river. Batteries in town, manned by the Frontenac Militia, began firing on the American ships, with one witness stationed at Mississauga Point battery recalling:

“They all came onwards, as far as [Murney Point] when to their great mortification, they experienced so heavy a cannonading from a battery of 2 nine pounders … as threw them into the greatest confusion.”

The batteries were manned with 9-pdr cannons, and being of small calibre did little to inflict damage on the ships, but deterred the Americans from sailing close to the town or landing an invasion party.

About 3pm, the militia shore batteries at Mississauga Point and Fort Frederick began opening up on the American squadron. Earl believed the Royal George was safe under the protection of the batteries, but Chauncey continued the attack into the harbour. The American vessels sailed past the town and Kingston peninsula, firing at the Royal George and the batteries. The four lead vessels crossed the harbour and turned back for another run at the Royal George. While turning, the smaller vessels came within range of the two batteries on Point Henry. Directing the artillery on Point Henry was Lt. Francois T. Lelievre of the Royal Newfoundland Fencibles. The ships soon sailed out of range and the small calibre artillery did little damage to the Americans. As the ships crossed in front of the peninsula, a militia battery from Fort Frederick opened up and fired on the lead ships.

While the lead vessels turned, the USS Oneida engaged the batteries and Royal George. During the fire fight, American seaman Thomas Garnet hit by a shot from a battery and cut in two.

Facing the relentless fire from the American squadron, Earle sailed further inland towards the town docks, hotly pursued by Chauncey, who ordered all ships to sail closer to the shore. Ned Myers recalled:

“I was stationed at a gun… and was too busy to see much; but I know we kept our piece speaking as fast as we could for a bit. We drove the Royal George from a second anchorage, quite up to a berth abreast of the town.”

As the Americans fired at the Royal George, many shots missed the ship and landed in the town, damaging many residences. With the distance between the ships closing, marines on board the Oneida exchanged fire with the Newfoundland Fencibles on the decks of the Royal George. The musketry grew intense and several casualties were sustained by both sides, as well as further damage to residences in town. Earl, fearful of an American boarding, ordered reinforcements from the town, and two boatloads of militia and soldiers were dispatched to the Royal George to act as marines.

While the USS Oneida fired on the Royal George, the smaller American vessels exchanged fire with the shore batteries at the mouth of the harbour, receiving heavy fire from the militia and batteries, but taking little damage. The Royal George took excessive damage, and the ship’s inexperienced gun crews did little damage in response. Chauncey later reported:

we did her much injury: that 4 Shot passed through her between wind and water, and that when she slipped and hauled on shore she was in a sinking condition, with both pumps going, 3 of her guns dismounted, her fore and main rigging cut away….and the ship very much injured in other respects. Many of the shot that passed through the ship went into the town and injured many houses.

Private John Sammon of the Newfoundland Fencibles, serving as a marine on the Royal George, was killed outright during the firefight, and several on both sides were injured.

During the fight, the iron 32-pdr gun of the USS Pert exploded, badly wounding the vessel’s commander, Sailing Master Arundel, and slightly injuring four others. Refusing to leave his post, Arundel was knocked over board by the boom and drowned while the schooner withdrew from combat. Lieutenant Charlton, with the 6-pdr field piece, arrived from Everett’s Point and joined the Mississauga Battery in firing on the ships. Around 4pm an American officer noted:

“The squadron is now exposed to the cross fire of five batteries, of flying artillery, of the ship with springs on her cables so as to enable her to bring her guns to bear … Showers of round and grape fell around us.”

Myers noted of the battery fire:

“one shot came in not far from my gun, and scattered lots of cat-tails, breaking in the hammock-cloths.”

During the battle, one of Chauncey’s ships had captured the Canadian schooner Mary Hatt, and taken her as a prize. With winds picking up and night falling, Chauncey signalled to his squadron to sail out of the harbour into Lake Ontario.

== Aftermath ==
The American squadron anchored behind Gage Island, and Chauncey assessed his attack. Two men had been killed and eight injured, with damage done to most of his ships. He intended to renew the attack on November 11, but poor weather conditions prevented the squadron from returning to Kingston.

Chauncey however, spotted the schooner Simcoe, sailing towards Kingston under the command of Lt. Richardson. Chauncey’s squadron chased the schooner, but Richardson out maneuvered the Americans until he took a shot to the hull and was forced to beach the ship west of Kingston. A detachment of British artillery and Addington Militia gathered on the shore and fired at the pursuing American ships, driving them back into Lake Ontario.

In the battle, the Provincial Marine had shown they were not an effective naval fighting force. An officer overseeing them wrote to the governor and commander-in-chief of British North America, Lieutenant-General Sir George Prevost:

“On Lake Ontario the good of the service calls for a radical change in all the officers [his emphasis] as I do not conceive there is one man of this division fit to command a ship of war.”

Only days after the battle, the Executive Council of Upper Canada described the American control of Lake Ontario as “distressing” adding:

“by land our success has exceeded our hopes – not so is our warfare on the lakes.”

All along the St. Lawrence and Lake Ontario front, Canadians feared another American attack, but by late November, Chauncey reported being forced from the lake by frigid temperatures and snow. Three days of heavy snow made roads to Chauncey’s naval base at Sackets Harbor almost impassable, and all action along the front ceased for the winter.

Chauncey’s attack on Kingston harbour was a minor battle, but had important strategic consequences. The garrison at Kingston had successfully protected the Royal George but the Americans were not deterred from another attempt. The harbour defences were bolstered after the battle and Provincial Marine personnel were trained and improved in 1813. The attack left Chauncey with control of Lake Ontario and gave the United States its only important success since the war began, but this success was not followed up, and the defence of Kingston and the Royal George resulted in a strategic victory for the British that would be exploited with further victories in 1813.

Kingston would never be attacked again during the war, and the town would become central to the development of the Provincial Marine’s greatest war ships in 1813 and 1814, with the British ultimately gaining control of Lake Ontario.
