= Sandwich First Baptist Church =

Historic church in Windsor, Ontario

- Église de la First Baptist Church de Sandwich
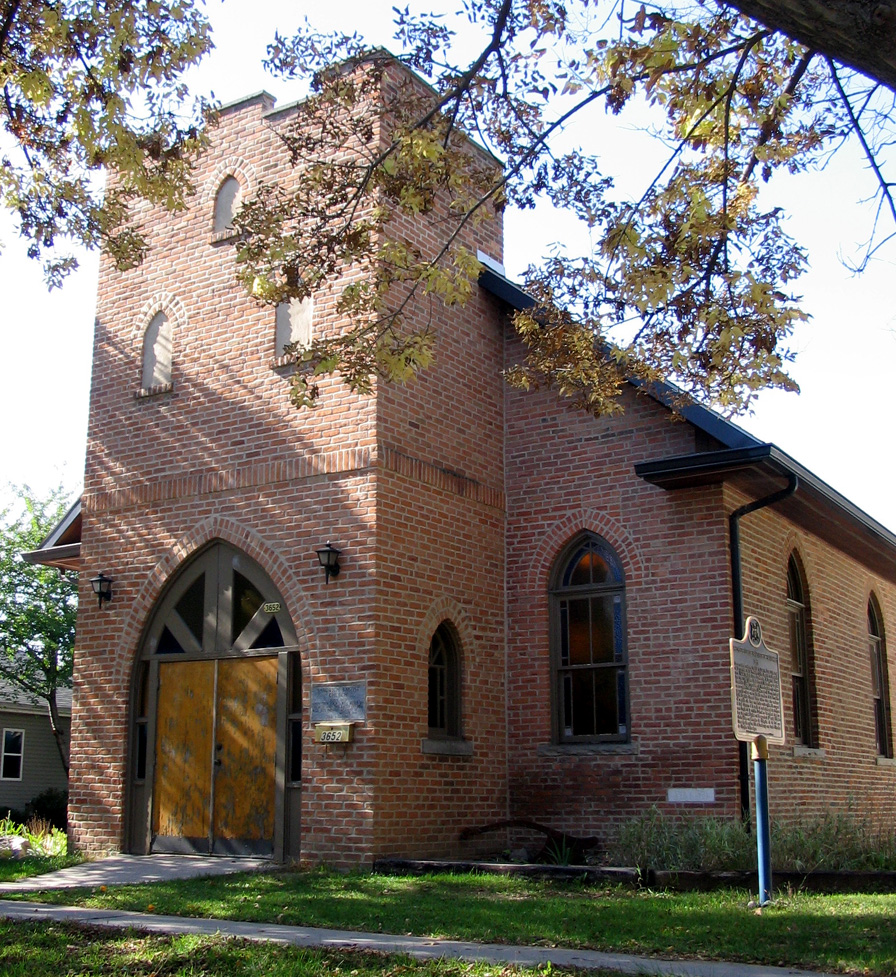
- The entrance to the church in 2008

- Location within Southern Ontario
- 42.2918°N 83.0802°W
- Location: 3652 Peter Street; Windsor, Ontario; N9C 1J7

History
- Built: 1851

National Historic Site of Canada
- Designated: 1999

The Sandwich First Baptist Church is a Black Baptist church located in the Sandwich neighbourhood of Windsor, Ontario, Canada. It was established to serve a community of refugees who had fled slavery on the Underground Railroad. The congregation was founded around 1840, and the current church building was constructed in 1851. It was designated a National Historic Site of Canada in 1999. The Sandwich First Baptist Church School was a 19th-century segregated Black school located in Windsor, Ontario, associated with the historic Sandwich First Baptist Church. Operating during a time of widespread racial discrimination in Canada, the school was established to provide basic education to Black children who were often excluded from local public schools. The church itself was a key stop along the Underground Railroad, and the school played a parallel role in offering literacy and religious instruction to families who had escaped slavery in the United States. The school reflects early efforts by Black Canadians to build autonomous community institutions in the face of structural exclusion.

== History ==
Due to its proximity to the Detroit River, which served as one of the crossing points into Canada for the Underground Railroad, the Sandwich area served as a refugee settlement and housed many people who had fled slavery in the United States. Around 600 people of colour lived in the area as of 1827. While Baptists had lived in Sandwich beginning no later than 1826, the First Baptist Church was only founded in or around 1840. The congregation initially met in the homes of members and later in a small log cabin that was constructed in 1847. (Note: Some articles in local newspapers give a date of 1839 or 1841.) Madison J. Lightfoot, who had previously helped to establish the Second Baptist Church in Detroit, served as the congregation's first minister, and continued in that role until 1853.

Together with the Detroit Second Baptist Church and the Amherstburg First Baptist Church, the Sandwich church was a founding member of the Amherstburg Regular Missionary Baptist Association (ARMBA). Established in 1841 in Amherstburg, Ontario, the ARMBA (originally the Baptist Association of Colored People) sought to represent the interests of Black baptists and would later go on to organize extensive anti-slavery activities. By 1861, the association's membership had grown from 47 to over 1,000 congregants.

Following fund-raising efforts, the church was constructed in 1851 on a 0.5-hectare (1.2-acre) patch of land granted by Queen Victoria for the purposes of constructing a church and a graveyard. The labour force consisted of the able-bodied members of the community; many of them made bricks from the Detroit River's clay by hand, while wealthier community members bought bricks from the Robinette Brickyard. Trees from the area were also used as building materials. Though the cornerstone was laid in 1851, the building remained unfinished as of 1852, and church members had to solicit donations to complete its construction.

Like other Black churches along the Ontario–United States border, the Sandwich church provided social and political support for those fleeing slavery and racial oppression on the Underground Railroad. The church was heavily involved in activism against slavery: monthly anti-slavery rallies were held there, and local history recounts that refugees would use the church as a hiding place to evade slave-catchers. Although there is little concrete evidence of the latter (which is not unexpected due to the secretive nature of the work), architectural features of the church such as its many crawlspaces and a former trap door leading to the basement lend credence to these accounts.

The Sandwich First Baptist Church was recognized by the Ontario Heritage Act in 1995 and designated a National Historic Site of Canada in 1999. It continues to function as a church while attracting visitors interested in its history; it is estimated that 14,000 tourists visited the site in 1996. In 2020, the church received a grant to finance the establishment of a museum dedicated to the Underground Railroad. The church's history was covered in a 2020 documentary titled The North Was Our Canaan.

== Description ==
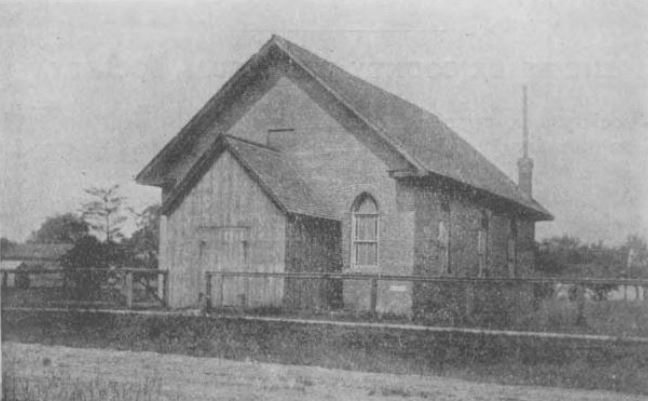
An early photo of the First Baptist Church, taken no later than 1909

The church building is a small and "unpretentious" structure. It is similar in design to other early Black churches in Ontario, with a gabled roof and a rectangular floor plan, but distinguished by its use of brick as a building material. The church's wooden floors, ceiling, and wainscoting were fashioned by hand. In 1868, a coal-burning stove was purchased and installed.

A two-storey crenellated tower stands at the entrance of the church; this was not part of the original design, but was added in 1920 to replace the old wooden entrance which had fallen into disrepair. Other Gothic Revival decorations, such as arches and pointed windows, were gradually added, and an extension was made to the rear of the church at an unknown date, though the main auditory hall was mostly left unmodified.
