= USS Scourge (1812) =

American warship converted from a confiscated Canadian merchant schooner

Coordinates: 43°18′27″N 79°18′26″W

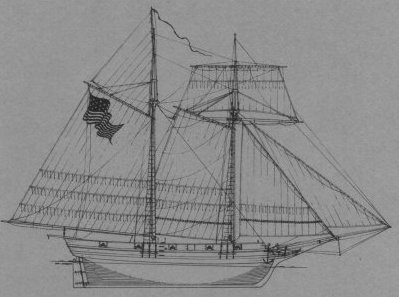
- Sail plan of the USS Scourge.

History

Canada
- Name: Lord Nelson
- Builder: James and William Crooks
- Launched: Niagara-on-the-Lake, Upper Canada, May 1, 1811
- Fate: Illegally seized by US Navy

United States
- Name: USS Scourge
- Acquired: by custom seizure, June 9, 1812
- Fate: Sunk in squall, August 8, 1813

General characteristics
- Type: Schooner
- Tonnage: 110 long tons (112 t)
- Complement: 45 to 50
- Armament: 4 × 6-pounder guns; 4 × 4-pounder guns
- Notes: 42 lost; 8 saved

USS Scourge was an American warship converted from a confiscated Canadian merchant schooner. She and the American warship Hamilton foundered at 2:00am on Sunday, August 8, 1813, during a squall on Lake Ontario. during the War of 1812.

Scourge began its career as the schooner Lord Nelson, named after the famous British Admiral Horatio Nelson. The schooner was built at Niagara-on-the-Lake in Upper Canada for merchants William and James Crooks and launched on May 1, 1811, as an unarmed merchant schooner to carry freight between Upper Canadian ports. The US Navy illegally seized Lord Nelson on June 9, 1812, almost two weeks before the War of 1812, on suspicion of smuggling. The schooner was on a voyage from Prescott, Upper Canada to Niagara, Upper Canada (then known as Newark) carrying freight and personal luggage when Lt. Melancthon T. Woolsey, captain of the American warship USS Oneida, detained her. Woolsey accused Lord Nelson's master of smuggling American goods in violation of the Embargo Act of 1807, which forbade trading between the United States and British colonies. The schooner was taken to the US naval base at Sackets Harbor, New York. Although there was no proof of smuggling and James Crooks immediately went to Sackets Harbour to dispute the seizure, the onset of war prevented the return of his vessel.

The US Navy commissioned the schooner at Sackets Harbor and renamed it USS Scourge. For naval service it was armed with four 6-pounder cannons and four 4-pounder cannons, and fitted with bulwarks. The schooner was placed in Captain Isaac Chauncey's squadron and patrolled Lake Ontario during the War of 1812. In July of 1813 the ship flew a flag bearing the words: "Free Trade, and Sailors' Rights"

About 84 men perished when the Hamilton and Scourge sank during a sudden squall off-shore from Fourteen Mile Creek, east of present-day Hamilton, Ontario around 2:00 am on Sunday August 8, 1813. Scourge was under the command of Sailing Master Joseph Osgood. According to a Letter of August 1813 after both ships were lost, a total of sixteen members of the crews survived. but the sinkings took more than 80 men to their deaths A survivor of the Scourge, Ned Myers, told his story to James Fenimore Cooper. According to Myers about eight men from the Scourge were saved, and about 42 were lost.

The site of the sunken ships was designated a National Historic Site of Canada in 1976. The Ontario Heritage Act was amended in 2005 to provide special protection to the shipwrecks of the Hamilton, the Scourge, and the SS Edmund Fitzgerald because of their historical and cultural significance and because they contain human remains.

After the war, the schooner's original owners, William and James Crooks, resumed their claim for the schooner. On July 11, 1817, the Court of Northern District of New York, determined that the vessel had been seized illegally. Despite the court's decision, compensation to the Crooks family was not paid because the clerk of the court had embezzled the funds. The Crooks brothers' descendants persisted and finally won compensation for the schooner in 1914, 102 years after its capture, thanks to the determination of Henry James Bethune and other descendants who had studied law and taken up the case over three generations. The award was $5,000, plus simple interest accrued between 1819 and 1912. Total compensation came to $23,644.38, but before the first payment could be made the outbreak of World War I caused Great Britain to renege on agreed-upon payments to U.S. citizens and the United States responded in kind. Alexander David Crooks, grandson of James Crooks who had inherited the legal case around 1895, continued to fight for the obligatory payments but was met by repeated administrative delays. In 1927 the United States finally paid the Government of Canada the amount due, which at that point was reduced to $15,546.63 after deduction of administrative and legal expenses, and was distributed by the Canadian government to 25 descendants (out of more than 100 claimants) of the Crooks brothers in 1930. 118 years elapsed between the illegal capture of the Lord Nelson before the Crooks family were compensated for their loss.
