= Kay-Nah-Chi-Wah-Nung =

Kay-Nah-Chi-Wah-Nung Historical Centre Manitou Mounds
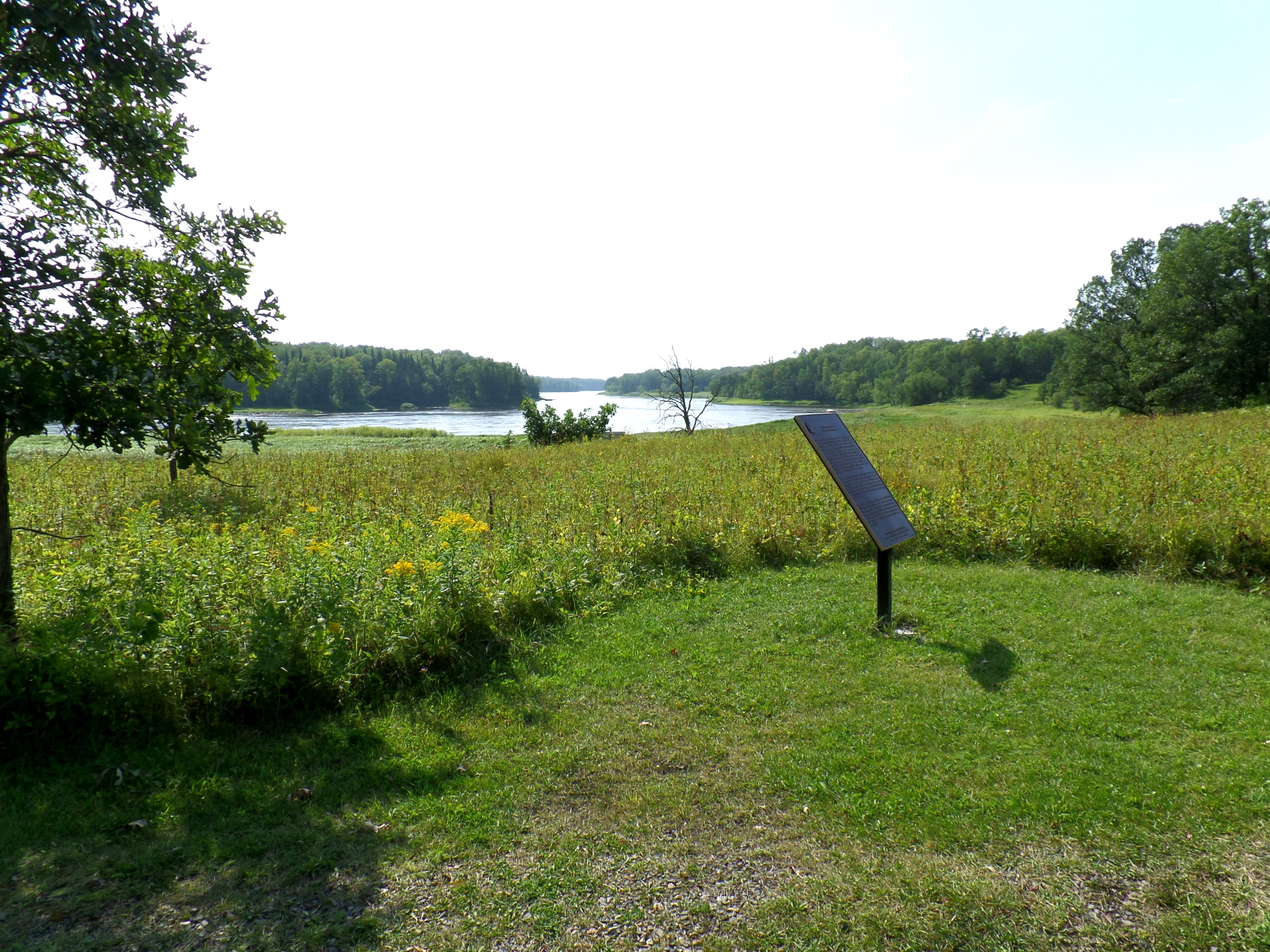

- Location within Ontario
- 48°38′48″N 94°04′27″W
- Location: near Ontario

Site notes
- Governing body: Rainy Lake First Nations; Parks Canada

National Historic Site of Canada
- Type: Cultural, Spiritual
- Criteria: Historic Sites and Monuments Act (Canada)
- Designated: 23 October 1969
- Reference no.: 12056
- Rainy River District: Northwestern Ontario, Canada
- Canada: List of National Historic Sites of Canada

The Kay-Nah-Chi-Wah-Nung Historical Centre, also known as Manitou Mounds, in Ontario, Canada, is a network of 30 village sites and 15 ancient burial mounds constructed from approximately 5000 BP during the Archaic Period, to 360 BP. Formerly called the Manitou Mounds National Historic Site, it is one of the "most significant centres of early habitation and ceremonial burial in Canada." It is located on a river stretch known as Long Sault Rapids on the north side of Rainy River, approximately 54 kilometres (34 miles) east of Fort Frances, in the Rainy River District of Northwestern Ontario, Canada off highway 11. It was designated as a National Historic Site of Canada in 1969.

== Description ==
The name Kay-Nah-Chi-Wah-Nung means "place of the long rapids" in Ojibway. It is also known as Manitou Mounds National Historic Site of Canada, GENWAAJIWANAANG, Rainy River Burial Mounds, and Armstrong Mounds. The larger network of mounds extends from Quetico in the east through Rainy River and Lake of the Woods into south-eastern Manitoba. There are approximately 20 archaeological sites. The burial mounds are as tall as 40 feet (12 m). The national historic site of Canada consists of a "500 metres (1,600 ft)-wide strip of lowland stretching 3 kilometres (1.9 mi) along the north bank of the Rainy River in the isolated area midway between Rainy Lake and Lake of the Woods.

== Cultural and spiritual significance ==
Its strategic location at the centre of major North American waterways, created a vibrant continent-wide trading network. Having direct contact with European fur traders and explorers of the 17th century, Aboriginal people continued to live in the area throughout the period of the fur trade and settlement eras. Kay-Nah-Chi-Wah-Nung permitted easy access to, and interaction with, people from other areas of the continent. It came to be known as a gathering place, where people would trade, share, celebrate and mourn. The Ojibway and their ancestors used the prominent sets of rapids along the Rainy River to fish. Because the rapids never froze, fish were in abundance during every season, thus supporting larger populations.

— Parks Canada 2013

The south-facing hills overlooking the Rainy River served as an ideal location for growing, harvesting and sharing medicinal plants. Specimens were brought by many First Nations peoples when they came there to trade.

The site is considered sacred to the Ojibwa, on whose traditional land it is located:

This site has deep cultural and spiritual significance to the Ojibway people as a living link in the continuum of past, present and future. Its location at the centre of a major network of North American waterways also means it has significance to First Nations peoples on other parts of the continent.

The heritage value of Kay-Nah-Chi-Wah-Nung National Historic Site of Canada resides in its historical associations with past and present cultures as symbolized by its strong sense of place, the location and natural features of the site, the presence of its ancient burial mounds and habitation sites, and the site's function as a living link between those who visited, occupied or used it in the past and the lives of the Ojibway people of today.

— NHSC Commemorative Integrity Statement 1998

== Pre-contact history ==
The Rainy River, a relatively wide, straight and peaceful river (with the exception of the fluvial terraces at Long Sault Rapids), was a major North American waterway. With waterways the most important means of transportation, it served as a superhighway for a vibrant continent-wide trading network for thousands of years.

Archaeological artefacts and sites dated at approximately 5,000 BP, provides evidence that the first residents of the area were nomadic hunters, fishers and gatherers known as Archaic people. They inhabited many parts of North America and traded extensively over large areas. First Nations consider these traditional lands to have been theirs for time immemorial.

Kay-Nah-Chi-Wah-Nung has the largest concentration of earthwork burial mounds in Canada. The mounds were built on river terraces along the north side of the Long Sault Rapids on Rainy River. The first mound-builders at the site were the Laurel culture (c.2300 BP - 900 BP). They lived "in villages and built large round burial mounds along the edge of the river, as monuments to their dead." Their mounds remain visible today.

The Blackduck culture (c.1200 BP to 400 BP) also built mounds along the Rainy River. The Blackduck mounds were low and linear.

== Treaty 3 ==
With the signing of Treaty no. 3 in 1873 to 1916, this site area was homesteaded by the Rainy Lake First Nations. Evidence of cabins and farm buildings have been found from that time on the site.

=== National Historic Site of Canada ===
It was designated a National Historic Site of Canada in 1969.

== Interpretive centre and museum ==
Opened in 1987, the interpretive centre showcases 10,000 years of aboriginal history. There is also a reconstructed village and tepee camp. In 1995, Parks Canada provided funds to improve the park, including the construction of the Kay-Nah-Chi-Wah-Nung Historical Centre and traditional Roundhouse for visitors and the local First Nations communities.

Along with a conservation lab and collection storage, the centre is also used as a meeting place for Elders. It is an educational resource for teaching Ojibway culture, continuing its role as gathering place that began thousands of years ago.

According to the Ontario Museum Association,

Inhabited continually for over 5,000 years, this national historic site interprets the pre-history and history of the Ojibway people of the Rainy River. Focusing mainly on the huge burial mounds, this site has an interpretive centre and guided tours. Members of the Rainy River First Nations interpret the site along the 3 km-long trail. Opportunities to learn about Ojibway stories and dance, to participate in a rendezvous, an archaeological dig, or an 1800s living village, are also offered.

— Ontario Museum Association 2009

The museum with a futuristic design is surrounded by wilderness with resident bear and deer.

The Ojibway people of the Rainy River First Nation are the present day guardians of Kay-Nah-Chi-Wan-Nung and have built a world-class historical centre on the beautiful 90-hectare site. The centre has five galleries, a conservation lab with more than 10,000 artifacts in storage, a gift shop (specializing in beautiful Ojibway arts and crafts), a first-class restaurant that serves traditional Ojibway cuisine, and is the gateway to the Manitou Mounds.

— Mather Department of Natural Resources Minnesota 2008

== See also ==
- Donovan (nd), Key to Ojibwe Place Names, archived from the original on 28 July 2012
- History of Ontario
- List of historic places in Ontario
- Ontario Heritage Act, legislation under which heritage sites of provincial or municipal significance are designated
