= Atherley Narrows Swing Bridge =

Rail bridge in Canada

Coordinates: 44.6050°N 79.3696°W

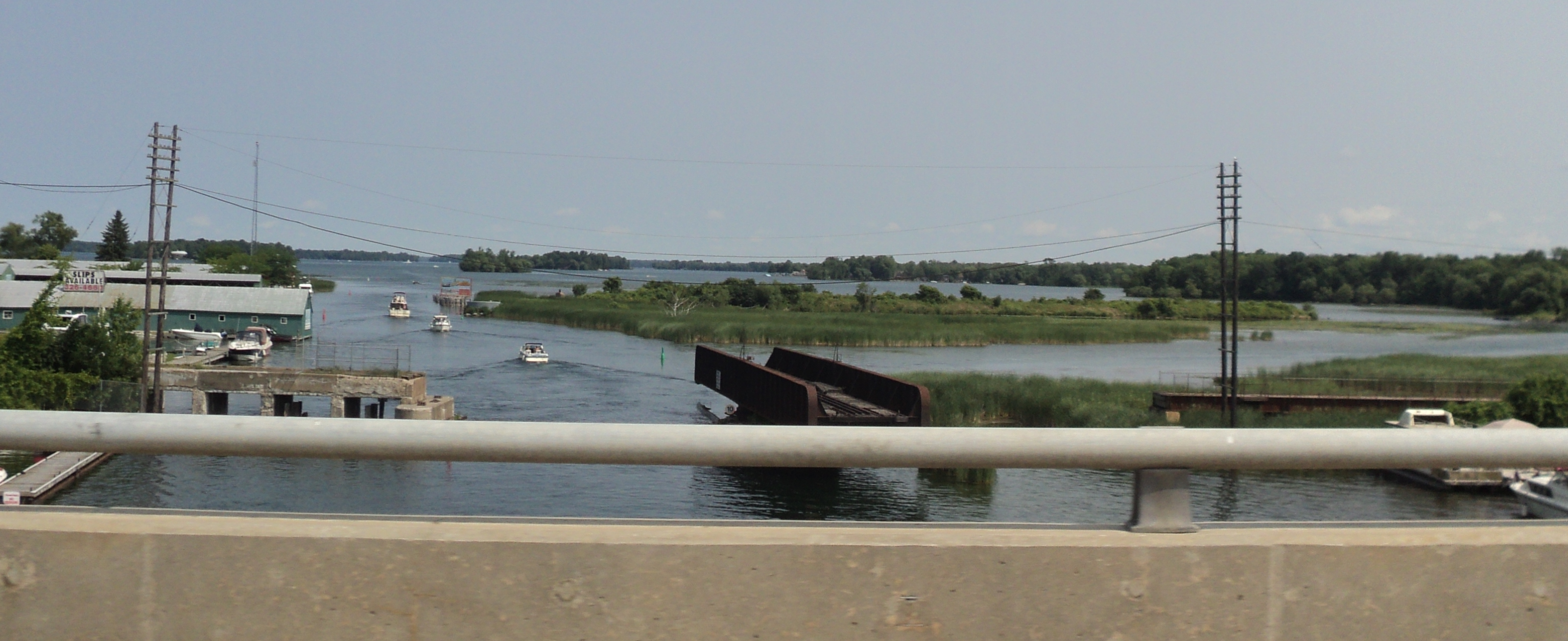
View of the Bridge, in the open position.

The Atherley Narrows Swing Bridge is a Canadian National rail bridge located at the confluence of Lake Simcoe and Lake Couchiching at the Atherley Narrows, near Orillia, Ontario.

The current bridge was constructed in 1970 as a plate girder bridge, consisting of nine steel through plate girder sections supported on eight steel pile bents. The western end of the east approach for the steel through plate girder structure is supported by a concrete pier on wooden piles built in 1919. The end of the eastern pier is made of concrete. Between 1843 and 1964, three railway bridges were constructed at the site and a navigation channel was dredged, all of which disturbed the Mnjikaning Fish Weirs. The swing bridge was deemed unsafe in a 2010 inspection by the railway. Reports to local police and the railway in 2011 declared that the wooden timber cribbing at the base of the swing bridge was decaying and shedding material into the water below.

As of 2013, the swing bridge is currently under review for use with the local trail system, as a link for pedestrian trails and snowmobile trails on both sided of the Narrows. The swing bridge is currently locked in the "open" position since the Canadian National Railway abandoned the line into Orillia and lifted the rails.
