= USS Hamilton (1809) =

United States Navy schooner which served on Lake Ontario

Coordinates: 43°18′27″N 79°18′26″W

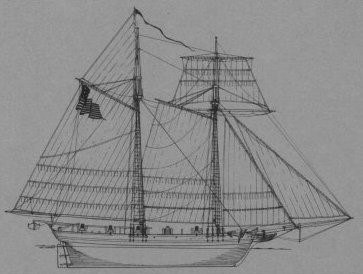
- The sail-plan of USS Hamilton.

History

United States
- Name: USS Hamilton
- Namesake: Paul Hamilton
- Launched: 1809
- Acquired: 21 October 1812
- Renamed: From Diana to Hamilton 5 November 1812
- Fate: Foundered 8 August 1813

General characteristics
- Type: Schooner
- Tons burthen: 76
- Length: 112 ft (34 m)
- Complement: 50
- Armament: 1 × 32 pounder; 8 × 12 pound carronades
- Notes: 42 lost; 8 saved

The first USS Hamilton was a United States Navy schooner which served on Lake Ontario from 1812 to 1813 during the War of 1812.

Hamilton was built at Oswego, New York, as the merchant ship Diana in 1809 for the merchant Matthew McNair. On 21 October 1812, the U.S. Navy purchased Diana for use on Lake Ontario. Diana was based at Sackets Harbor, New York. Her name was changed to USS Hamilton on 5 November 1812, in honor of the United States Secretary of the Navy Paul Hamilton.

Hamilton was not a large or specialized warship; instead, she was a simple ship that was pressed into U.S. Navy service. With the conversion of Hamilton to a man-of-war problems came up such as the decks not being strong enough to carry naval guns and the bulwarks not being high enough to provide enough protection for the gun crews. Nonetheless, the 76 tons burthen Hamilton was armed with eight 12-pounder carronades and one swiveling 24-or 32-pounder "Long Tom" cannon mounted amidships.

Hamilton, under the command of a Lieutenant Walter Winter, and the schooner USS Scourge sank during a sudden squall off Fourteen Mile Creek near present-day Hamilton, Ontario, Canada, around 2:00 a.m. on 8 August 1813. Sixteen men survived from the two ships, but the sinkings took more than 80 men to their deaths. Ned Myers, a survivor of Scourge, told his story to James Fenimore Cooper; according to Myers, about eight men from Hamilton were saved and about 42 were lost.

The site of the sunken ships was designated a National Historic Site of Canada in 1976. The Ontario Heritage Act was amended in 2005 to provide special protection to the wrecks of Hamilton and Scourge because of their historical and cultural significance and because they contain human remains.
