= Donaldson site =

Archeological site in Canada

- Interactive map of Donaldson site
- 44°30′21″N 81°20′3″W
- Type: Seasonal harvesting station
- Periods: Woodland
- Cultures: Saugeen
- Location: along Saugeen River
- Region: Bruce County

Site notes
- Area: 1.2 hectares (3.0 acres)
- Archaeologists: James V. Wright; William Finlayson

National Historic Site of Canada
- Official name: Donaldson site
- Type: Cultural
- Designated: 12 June 1982

The Donaldson site is an archaeological site in Ontario that was designated a National Historic Site of Canada in 1982. The 3-acre (12,000 m^{2}) site is the largest within the Saugeen complex, and is representative of typical habitation and mortuary practices of the Woodland period before the European discovery of the Americas, from about 200 BCE until 700 CE.

It suggests that Bruce County and Huron County have been inhabited by Algonquian speakers for millennia. The Donaldson site was used primarily as a "seasonal harvesting station", mainly for fishing. It also may represent the earliest instance of broader social groups more characteristic of the Late Woodland period.

== Archaeology ==
The site, discovered on the farm of Elmer Donaldson, was first documented by a collector in 1947. Four significant excavations were conducted at the site, by Thomas Lee in the 1940s and again in the 1950s, by James V. Wright in 1960, and by William Finlayson in 1971. Wright and Anderson identified a hillside midden in 1960, which was excavated by Finlayson in 1971.

Among the findings by Wright of the site were 13 skeletons, grave artefacts, pottery, and the outlines of two house structures. The study team would return a "representative collection" of the objects discovered to the Bruce County Museum in 1961. The two house outlines were rectanguloid, about 17 by 23 feet (5.2 by 7.0 m). Radiocarbon dating suggests the site was used from about 200 BCE to 700 CE, with primary occupation occurring early in this period.

Artefacts indicate that the Middle Woodland culture at this site used bear bones. At one of the burial mounds, a child's necklace was discovered having two "ground and perforated bear canines".

=== Pottery ===
The pottery uncovered at the Donaldson site, as well as that at the Thede side, displays the "most outstanding trend" of Saugeen pottery, exhibiting significant stylistic diversity. The diversity was greater than pottery assemblages in the Point Peninsula tradition, according to Wright and Anderson perhaps partly owing to the generally careless application of decorative tools rather than use of a broader set of patterns.

=== Fishing ===
Fish remains discovered at the site from the Middle Woodland period include bass, channel catfish, freshwater drum, lake sturgeon, pickerel, walleye, white sucker, and yellow perch. The most important of these was lake sturgeon.

It is likely that spearfishing was the primary means of catching fish, as eight harpoon heads (two bone and six toggle-head) were found at the site, and there was a "near absence" of sinkers (two end-notched sinkers, one side-notched sinker, and one copper gorge, a type of primitive fishing hook) indicating that fishing nets were not commonly used. Sinkers and copper hooks were found at the Inverhuron–Lucas site, about 48 kilometres (30 mi) south. According to Finlayson, this suggests that there was spring spearfishing in the Saugeen rapids during spawning season, and in the summer small groups would fish with nets and hooks at shore sites. In particular, it was used in early spring to harvest northern pike, pickerel, and white sucker; in the late spring to harvest smallmouth bass and stone cat; in July to harvest freshwater drum, and possibly as late as November to harvest lake whitefish and lake trout, though the latter interpretation "should be considered tentative". Angling was probably not an important fishing technique at the Donaldson site.

== Description ==
Location of Donaldson site, near Lake Huron, within Southern Ontario

The site is located on the north shore of the Saugeen River in the valley northeast of Southampton in Bruce County. It is at the "first major rapids upstream" from Lake Huron, on three fluvial terraces, approximately 4 kilometres (2.5 mi) from the lake.

It was a settlement occupied by multiple bands of indigenous peoples, who arrived in the spring to catch the fish that had come to spawn in the river. The corpses of band members who had died elsewhere during the previous year were brought to this site for burial at one of two band cemeteries. In the earlier cemetery, each interred individual was accompanied by grave offerings, and in the later cemetery, only infants and children had such offerings.

In addition to the burial mounds, the site contains the remains of middens, post holes, hearth pits, and "identifiable rectangular structures". The hearth pits were located on the upper and middle terraces. The middens contained a significant number of ceramic, stone, metal, and bone artefacts.

== National Historic Site ==
The archaeological site was designated a federal National Historic Site on 12 June 1982, and was listed on the Canadian Register of Historic Places on 27 March 2013.
