= Pointe au Baril =

Pointe au Baril may refer to:

- Pointe au Baril, Ontario, a community in the Parry Sound District, Ontario, Canada
- Pointe au Baril, a National Historic Site of Canada in Maitland, Ontario
