= Amherstburg First Baptist Church =

Church in Amherstburg, Ontario, Canada

- Amherstburg First Baptist Church
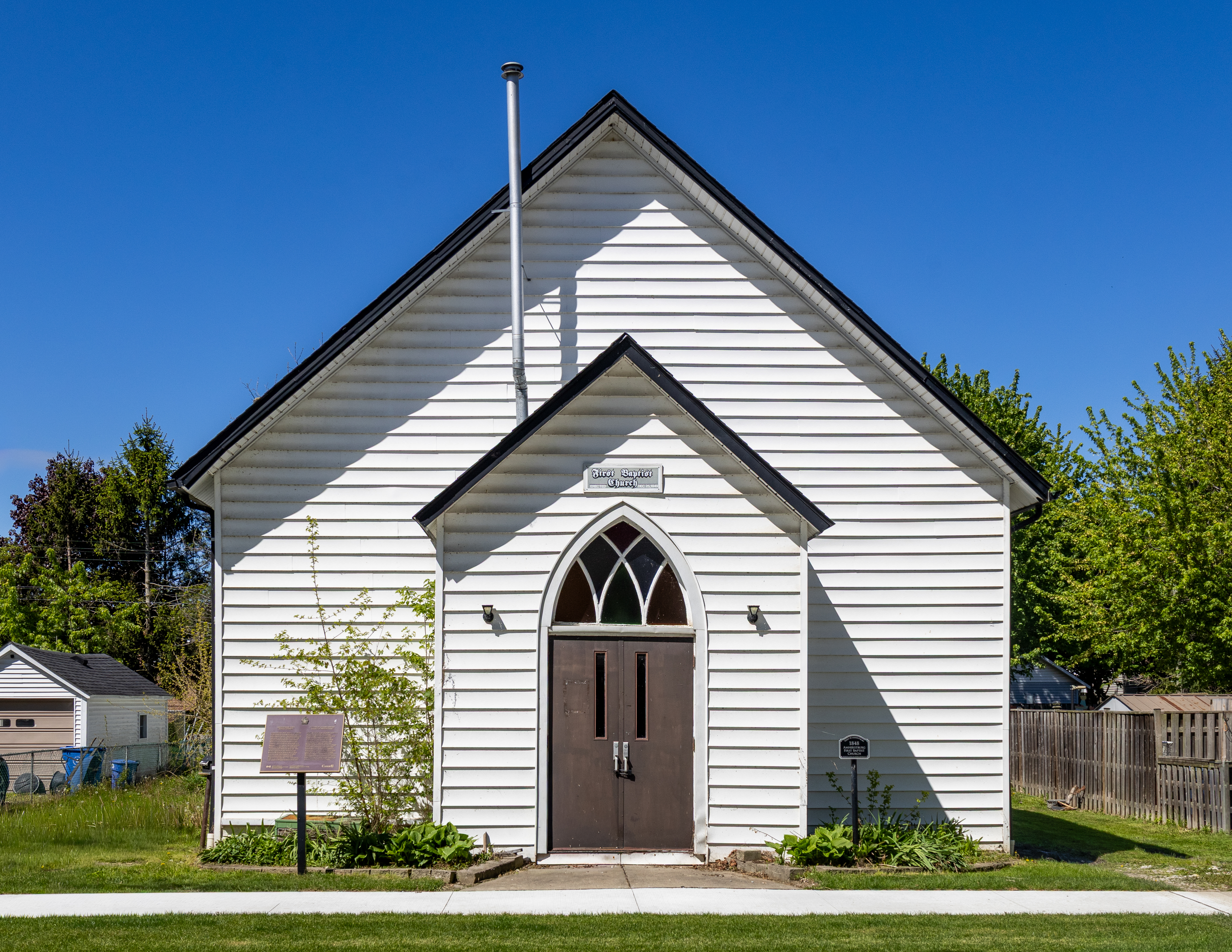
- Amherstburg First Baptist Church
- 42.1027°N 83.1057°W
- Address: 232 George Street, Amherstburg, Ontario, Canada
- Country: Canada
- Denomination: Baptist

History
- Founded: 1848
- Founder: Anthony Binga Sr.

Architecture
- Style: Neoclassical

Specifications
- Capacity: 100

The Amherstburg First Baptist Church is a Baptist church in Amherstburg, Ontario, Canada, established in 1848 to serve the town's growing Black community, many of whom had escaped slavery in the United States. The church was a terminus on the Underground Railroad, with members and Pastor Anthony Binga Sr. providing support to persons who crossed the Detroit River on their journey into Upper Canada. The First Baptist Church was also the mother church of the Amherstburg Regular Missionary Baptist Association, an association of local Baptist ministries that established churches and created opportunities for Black Canadians. It has remained active, though by the 2010s the congregation had dwindled to twenty members.

Architecturally, the First Baptist Church is a one-storey building with rectangular massing in the Neoclassical style, with elements of Gothic Revival architecture in the windows. The building's original wood panel walls are covered in vinyl. Access is provided through a small vestibule, which enters into a rectangular central hall. A later addition provides space for social gatherings. The First Baptist Church was designated by the Town of Amherstburg under the Ontario Heritage Act in 1978 and made a National Historic Site of Canada in 2013.

== Description ==
The First Baptist Church is located at 232 George Street, on a small, flat lot in a residential area of Amherstburg, Ontario. As with many contemporary Protestant churches built by Black settlers, the First Baptist Church is built at a modest scale and with simple massing. It is described by the Town of Amherstburg as using a simplified Neoclassical style, with elements of Gothic Revival architecture evident in the windows.

The single-storey First Baptist Church is a timber frame construction with wood siding—now covered with vinyl—on a rectangular footprint. The foundation is made of cement block. The roof is gabled, with the western end facing the road, and adorned by a brick chimney. Along the northern and southern sides are pointed arch windows. Behind the sanctuary is a hall used for social activities, the entrance to which is flanked by four double windows.

The First Baptist Church is accessed through double doors, modern additions that lead to a small vestibule. Its central hall is designed to allow full view of the preacher, as well as to facilitate the congregation's ability to hear and respond to sermons. The hall has an angled barrel vaulted ceiling that rises to the full height of the roof, which the reporter Desiree Cooper likened to the upturned hull of an ark. Furnishings include oak pews. The building has a capacity of 100 congregants, and is one of the oldest Baptist churches in Ontario.

== History ==
=== Establishment ===
The town of Amherstburg is located along a relatively narrow stretch of the Detroit River, which separates the United States from Canada. As a result, it was a common stop for Blacks escaping slavery in the United States, and a terminus on the Underground Railroad. Escaped American slaves began settling in Amherstburg in the 1820s, joining the town's existing population of Black Canadians. A congregation of Black Baptists formed under Pastor Anthony Binga Sr., who had escaped slavery in Green County, Kentucky, in 1836. Services were initially held in members' homes, then in a rented house.

As the congregation grew, in part due to the arrival of more Blacks escaping slavery, the congregation began raising funds to build a church of their own in 1845. Binga travelled by foot as far afield as Detroit and Toronto to find support. In 1848, after several years of fundraising, they began work building the First Baptist Church, using locally collected wood that was hewn by hand. Deacon George Crawford served as master carpenter, with other deacons providing assistance. The church was completed the following year, and formally dedicated in December 1849. (Note: Parks Canada gives December 21, while the Town of Amherstburg gives December 25.)

The George Street area had been developed at approximately the same time, and the location of this mixed-race neighbourhood at a distance from the Detroit River helped mitigate the risk of slave catchers. Most of the congregation were escaped slaves, and the church soon became a sanctuary for Blacks escaping slavery. An abolitionist, Binga also served as a conductor on the Underground Railroad; in an 1898 interview with Wilbur Henry Siebert, he recalled escaping slaves entering Amherstburg "like frogs in Egypt" after the passage of the Fugitive Slave Act of 1850. Binga worked with Isaac Rice and Hiram Wilson to provide provisions and healthcare to escaping slaves, as well as help them find employment, and the First Baptist Church provided education to escaped slaves,

The First Baptist Church was the mother church of the Amherstburg Regular Missionary Baptist Association, established in 1841 as the Alliance of the Baptist Association for Colored People. Consisting of several Black Baptist ministries, including the Second Baptist Church of Detroit under William C. Monroe, the association is described by Canada's Historic Places as "one of the most important Black organizations in Canada West". It established numerous churches and offered Black Canadians opportunities to which they lacked access elsewhere.

=== Subsequent history ===
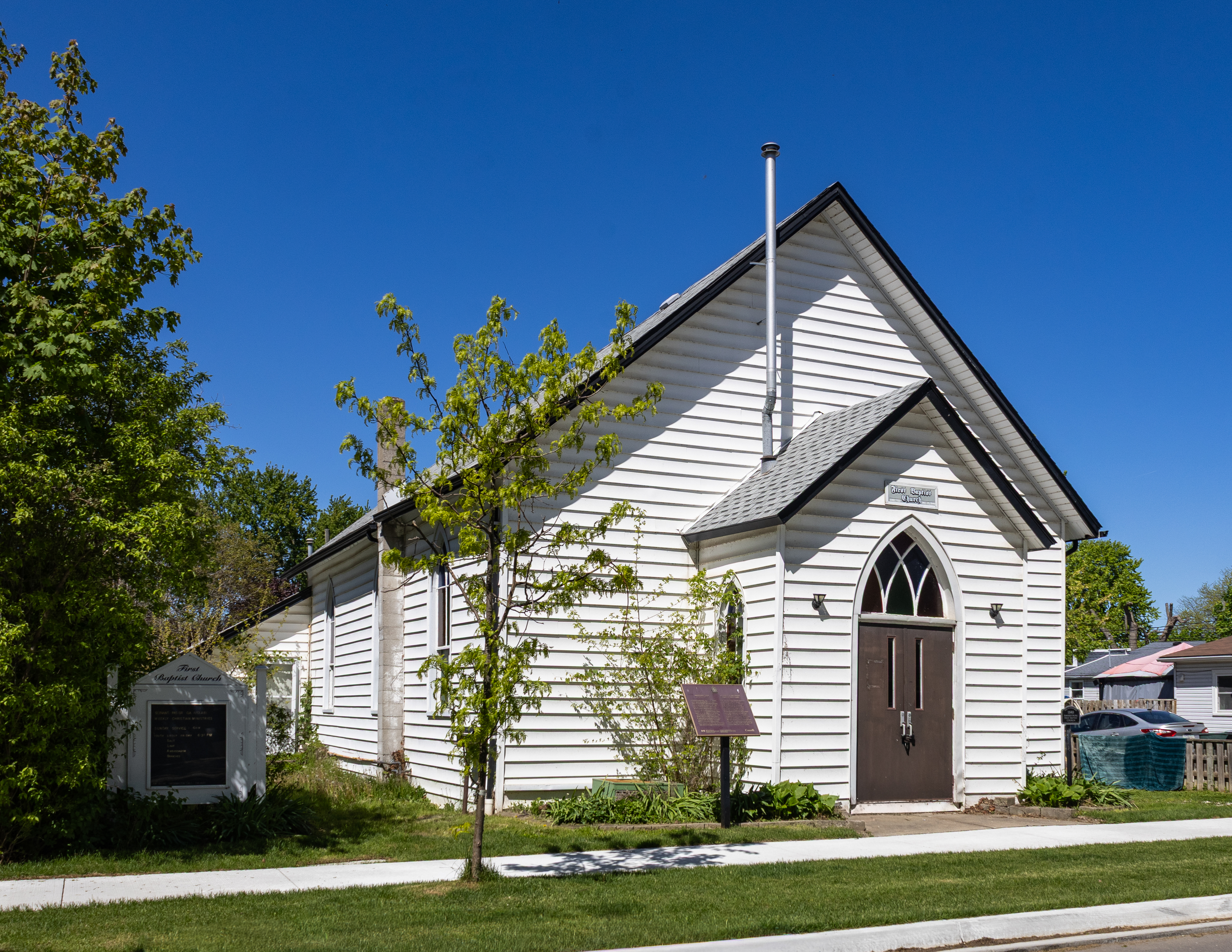
A three-quarter view of the church, showing the windows and later addition

Binga left the First Baptist Church for Mount Pleasant in 1857, after which the church was without a pastor; services were conducted by deacons. A few years later, Reverend J. D. Holbert, previously a licentiate minister, became pastor. In the 1860s, the church had several pastors, with Binga returning in 1865, R. M. Duling serving in 1866, and Binga's son Anthony Binga Jr. spending some time serving after his ordainment. In the 1870s, pastors included R. Fairfax, William Pitt, and Jos. O. Johnston.

Additions were constructed in 1883, 1907, and in the 1950s. In 1978, the church was designated by the Town of Amherstburg under the Ontario Heritage Act through Bylaw No. 1528. At the time, the church had asbestos siding. In 2002, the church was led by Reverend Dale Simmons, and its congregation consisted mostly of descendants of the original founders. By the 2010s, the congregation at the First Baptist Church had dwindled to twenty members. Due to structural issues, which included rotting floor supports and drainage problems, the church was closed for worship for effective November 29, 2011, with worship moved to the Amherstburg Food and Fellowship Mission. The church remained closed for almost a year, only reopening after a temporary fix was installed.

The church was designated a National Historic Site of Canada in 2013, partly due to its role in the Underground Railroad in Canada, partly due to its architectural value, and partly due to its role in the development of Black Gospel communities in Canada. In a news release, Minister of the Environment Peter Kent highlighted the church's role in the development of the Black Baptist tradition in Canada and described the designation as helping "remind Canadians of the key role faith organizations have played in the development of our cultural communities." Speaking with the Windsor Star, Pastor Olaniyi Afolabi of the First Baptist Church expressed hope that the designation would allow access to grants that would help cover further repairs.

The First Baptist Church is a stop on the African Canadian Heritage Tour, a driving tour in Southwestern Ontario that also includes the Sandwich First Baptist Church in Windsor, the Amherstburg Freedom Museum, and the Josiah Henson Museum of African-Canadian History in Dresden. The site had been advertised by the Ministry of Tourism, seeking to attract tourists from the United States, as early as 1991.

== Works cited ==
- "Amherstburg First Baptist Church, Amherstburg, Ontario". Parks Canada. Archived from the original on May 11, 2026.
- "Amherstburg First Baptist Church National Historic Site of Canada". Canada's Historic Places. Parks Canada. Archived from the original on May 11, 2026.
- "Amherstburg First Baptist Church National Historic Site of Canada". Parks Canada. Archived from the original on May 11, 2026.
- Cross, Brian (February 22, 2013). "Amherstburg Church Named a National Historic Site". CBC. Archived from the original on May 11, 2026.
- "Binga Family". Amherstburg Freedom Museum. Archived from the original on May 11, 2026.
- Town of Amherstburg (June 26, 1978). "By-Law No. 1528". Ontario Heritage Trust. Archived from the original on May 11, 2026.
- Dhir, TJ (February 23, 2023). "Tour Tells Story of Black History in Southwestern Ontario". CBC. Archived from the original on May 11, 2026.
- Grant, Robin (December 20, 2011). "Historic Church Literally Sinking". The Windsor Star. p. A1. ProQuest 912410159 – via ProQuest.
- McArthur, Douglas (November 2, 1991). "Travel Advisory: Ontario's Black Heritage". The Globe and Mail. p. F1. ProQuest 385434234 – via ProQuest.
- "Harper Government Designates First Baptist Church in Amherstburg as National Historic Site". Government of Canada. February 19, 2013. Archived from the original on May 11, 2026.
- "Municipally Designated Heritage Properties". Town of Amherstburg. Archived from the original on May 11, 2026.
- "Profile: Shared History of African-Americans and African-Canadians". All Things Considered. NPR. February 26, 2002. p. 1. ProQuest 190093271 – via ProQuest.
- Talley, Scott (December 28, 2025). "Linking a Proud Detroit Past to Today Lifts Second Baptist Church's Pastor". Detroit Free Press. p. A6. ProQuest 3287485735 – via ProQuest.
