= Thunder Bay Tourist Pagoda =

Coordinates: 48.434571°N 89.218050°W

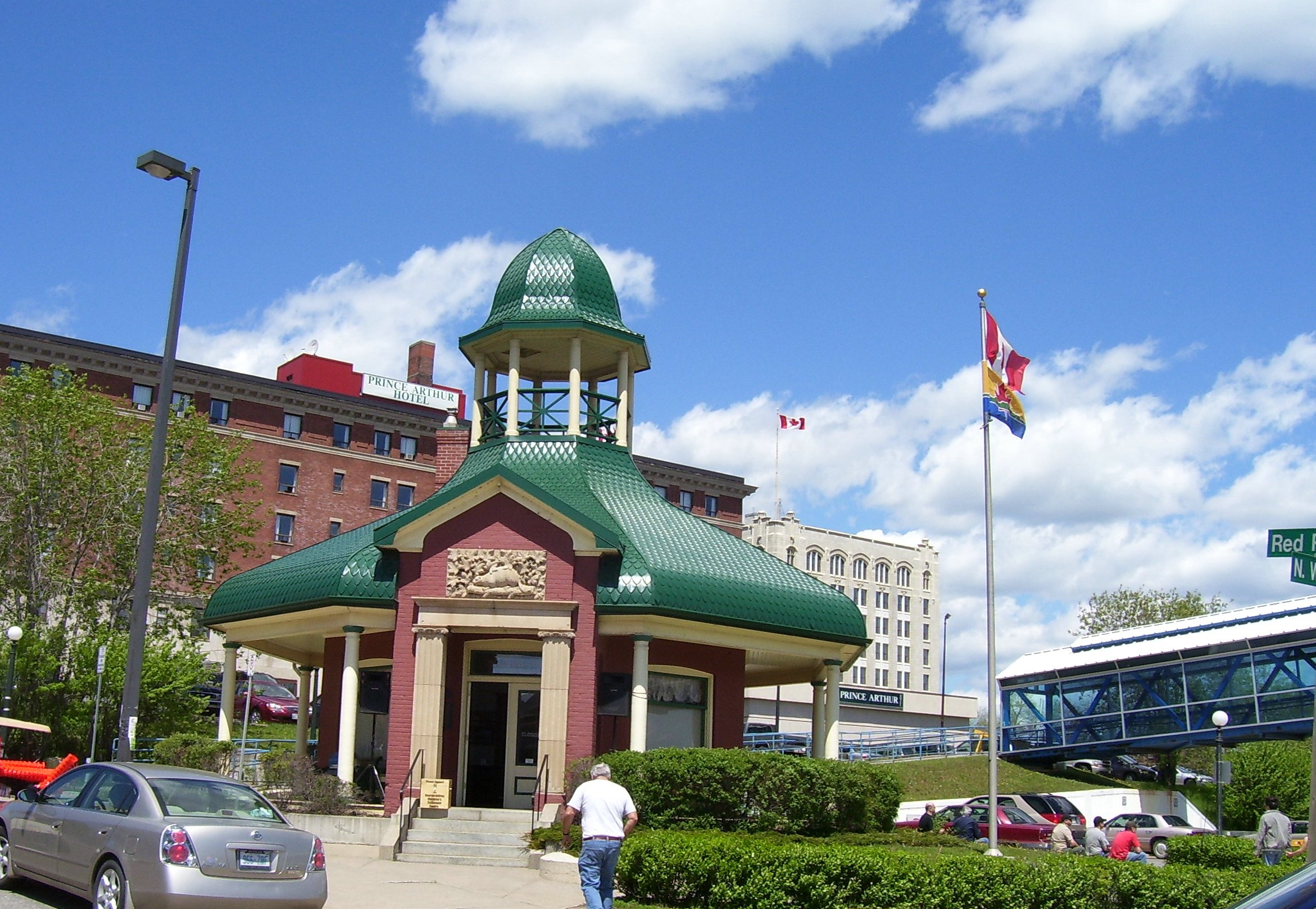
- Type: whimsical information kiosk
- Location: Thunder Bay, Ontario, Canada
- Built: 1909
- Architectural style(s): Classical/Asian
- Governing body: Parks Canada

National Historic Site of Canada
- Designated: 1986

The Thunder Bay Tourist Pagoda, built in 1909, was an early tourist bureau promoting the city of Port Arthur, Ontario. Located on the waterfront and close to the former train station, the pagoda was intended to attract the attention of visitors arriving by rail or water. Competition with nearby Fort William was one factor leading to its construction. Another factor was the planned construction of the nearby Prince Arthur Hotel, completed around 1910.

The hexagonal-shaped structure, designed by architect H. Russell Halton, was in use until 1986, when it was closed. In 1986, the building was designed as a National Historic Site of Canada. It was later reopened as a heritage building.

The stone panel over the entrance depicts a beaver and a maple branch, both symbols of Canada. A gable extending over the entrance includes a small dragon's head, said to be a Scandinavian good luck symbol. In 1961, 1973 and 1985, the roof of the pagoda was painted in multi-coloured polka dots.
