= Ned Myers =

Ned Myers (born c. 1793) was an American sailor. Born in Lower Canada as a British subject, Myers grew up in Halifax after being abandoned by his father. He moved to New York City at the age of eleven, cherishing the dream of becoming a sailor. Two years later, while serving aboard the merchant ship Sterling, Myers would meet James Fenimore Cooper, who would later write a biography of him titled Ned Myers, or, a Life Before the Mast (1843). Myers rejected his status as a British subject and became an American citizen, something that would cause him trouble when he was captured by a Royal Navy warship in the summer of 1812. He was a survivor of the sinking of USS Scourge. However, Myers would live through the War of 1812, meeting with Cooper in 1843 for the authoring of his biography.

== Sources ==
- Keese, G. Pomeroy (August 4, 1900). "Cooper's "Ned Myers."". The New York Times.
- Taylor, Alan (2010). The Civil War of 1812. New York: Alfred A. Knopf. ISBN 978-1-4000-4265-4.
