= Fort Norfolk (Ontario) =

Minor fortification in Norfolk County, Ontario, Canada

Coordinates: 42.6901°N 80.3300°W

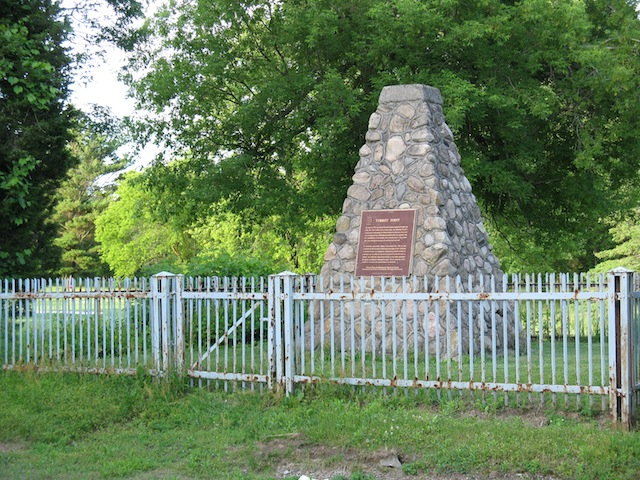
- Type: War of 1812 fortification
- Location: Ontario, Canada
- Nearest city: Norfolk County
- Built: 1813-14
- Governing body: Parks Canada
- Website: Cultural Built Heritage

National Historic Site of Canada
- Designated: 1925

Fort Norfolk was a minor fortification built at Turkey Point (now Norfolk County, Ontario, Canada) during the War of 1812 to defend the southwestern end of Upper Canada. It is a National Historic Site of Canada.

A redebout with single blockhouse structure surrounded by log palisades was built on the bluffs was built by the 37th Regiment of Foot during the winter of 1814-1815 to house several hundred soldiers. A larger fort and ship building facility was planned, but it was never built. The existence of the facility diminished and abandoned shortly after the War of 1812. A memorial cairn was added in 1922 to mark the site.
