= Saugeen complex =

First Nations culture (200 BCE-500 CE)

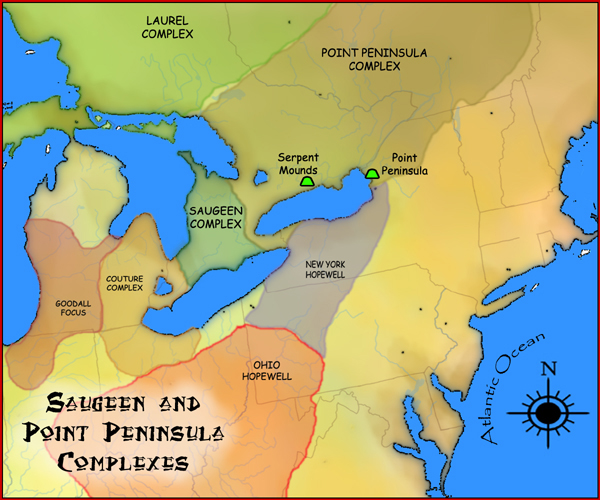
- Point Peninsula and Saugeen complexes
- Race: First Nations
- Period: Middle Woodland
- Dates: 200 BCE – 500 CE

The Saugeen complex was a First Nations culture located around the southeast shores of Lake Huron and the Bruce Peninsula, around the London area, and possibly as far east as the Grand River. They were active in the period 200 BCE to 500 CE. Archaeological evidence suggests that Saugeen complex people of the Bruce Peninsula may have evolved into the Odawa people (Ottawa).

== Academic context ==
In mid-20th century archaeology, the Middle Woodland period in Ontario was conceived of as being divided geographically into three regional complexes: the Couture in the far southwest, the Point Peninsula in south-central and eastern Ontario, and the Saugeen in much of the rest of southwestern Ontario. David Marvyn Stothers, who originally conceptualized the Princess Point complex as an archaeological culture, argued in a 1973 article that it and the Saugeen were unrelated.

However, with continued discoveries and understanding of the period, the idea of distinct, separate complexes has been eroded, especially with the discovery of greater local variability in material culture. Therefore, scholars such as Neal Ferris and Michael Spence have proposed abandonment of the framework altogether, or relegation of the terms to purely geographic use, with their replacement by more localized complexes.

== Hopewell Interaction Sphere ==
The Hopewell Exchange system began in the Ohio and Illinois River valleys about 200 BCE. The culture is referred to more as a system of interaction among a variety of societies than as a single society or culture. Hopewell trading networks were quite extensive, and their valued commodities included obsidian from the Yellowstone area, copper from Lake Superior, and shells from the Gulf Coast. The Hopewell tradition was not a single culture or society, but a widely dispersed set of related populations. They were connected by a network of trade routes. known as the Hopewell Exchange System. At its greatest extent, the Hopewell exchange system ran from the Southeastern United States into the southeastern Canadian shores of Lake Ontario. Within this area, societies participated in a high degree of exchange with the highest amount of activity along waterways, the easiest transportation routes.

Burial customs of the Saugeen people were similar to those of the nearby Point Peninsula complex. The evidence from excavations suggests a band size of about 50 individuals. No indications of status differences have been found in excavations, but no mounds in the Saugeen complex have been excavated. The main distinction between the Saugeen complex and the nearby Point Peninsula complex peoples seems to be that Saugeen ceramics were cruder in construction and decoration.

== See also ==
- Donaldson site
- Hopewell tradition
- List of Hopewell sites
- Princess Point complex
