= Ontario Heritage Act =

Canadian act

Legislative Assembly of Ontario
- Enacted by: Legislative Assembly of Ontario
- Status: In force

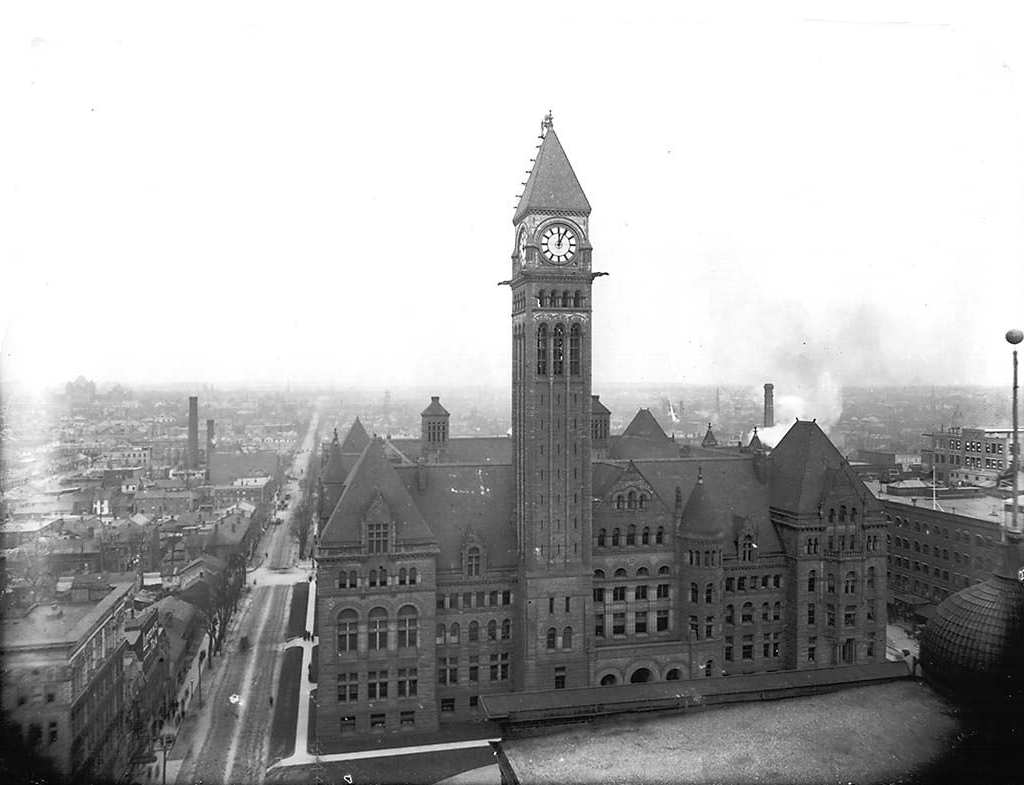
Old City Hall in Toronto in 1907. Its proposed demolition in the 1960s contributed to increased heritage awareness in Ontario, which led to heritage protection measures such as the Ontario Heritage Act.

The Ontario Heritage Act, (the Act) first enacted on March 5, 1975, allows municipalities and the provincial government to designate individual properties and districts in the Canadian Province of Ontario, as being of cultural heritage value or interest.

== Designation under the Ontario Heritage Act ==
Once a property has been designated under Part IV of the Act, a property owner must apply to the local municipality for a permit to undertake alterations to any of the identified heritage elements of the property or to demolish any buildings or structures on the property.

Part V of the Act allows for the designation of heritage conservation districts.

== Amendments to the legislation ==
Until 2005, a designation of a property under the Act allowed a municipality to delay, but not ultimately prevent, the demolition of a heritage property. Heritage advocates were highly critical of the 180-day "cooling off" period provided for under the legislation, which was intended to allow time for municipalities and landowners to negotiate an appropriate level of heritage preservation, but often simply resulted in the landowner "waiting out the clock" and demolishing the heritage building once the protection of the Ontario Heritage Act had expired.

In 2005, the provincial government enacted changes to strengthen the Act. Under the amended legislation, a landowner who is refused a demolition permit under the Act no longer has an automatic right to demolish a designated building once the cooling off period has expired. Instead, the landowner has the option to appeal the permit refusal to the Conservation Review Board for individual properties or the Ontario Municipal Board for properties within a Heritage Conservation District and the appropriate board would make the final decision on whether or not a demolition permit is issued. Where the OMB refuses to issue a permit, the landowner would have no choice but to preserve the heritage building.

The amended legislation also contains provisions which enable municipalities to enact by-laws to require owners of designated buildings to maintain the structures and their heritage elements. Such by-laws are intended to prevent "demolition by neglect", although the collapse of Walnut Hall in Toronto demonstrates that such buildings are still at risk.

== Implementation and issues ==
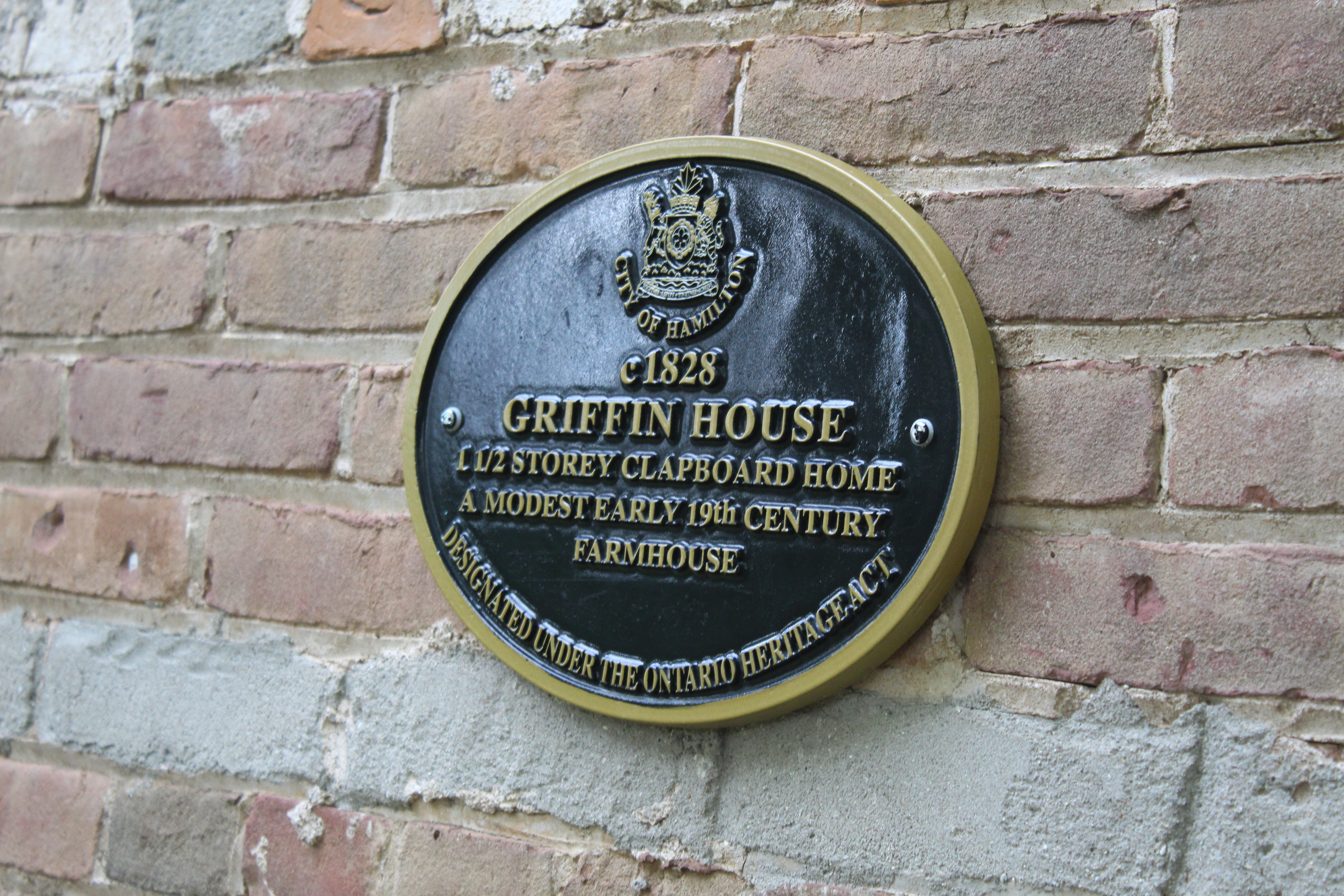
Plaque on the Griffin House in the Dundas Valley Conservation Area, showing that the building is protected under the Act.

Heritage designation is not universally welcomed. Because it imposes restrictions, or at least delay, on alteration or demolition of protected properties, some owners and would-be developers feel their property rights are compromised. There is also concern that the restrictions will make it more difficult to sell and/or develop affected properties, with a negative impact on market values.

Ottawa: As part of the city's heritage inventory project, the city is reviewing properties in Old Ottawa East and Old Ottawa South and placing those considered to have "cultural heritage value" on a registry. Owners will be required to give 60 days notice to the city before demolishing a listed property.

Rockcliffe Park: The entire village, which is now part of the City of Ottawa, became a Heritage Conservation District in 2016. The objective is not just conservation of individual buildings but of the park-like qualities of the area as a whole. This means that lot sizes, spacings between houses, and streetscapes are also protected; for example, new circular driveways are no longer permitted. There is a current appeal by a home-owner who is also a developer. Pending the outcome of a September 2017 hearing before the Ontario Municipal Board, City of Ottawa policy is to continue to apply the Heritage Conservation Plan.

Experience with the new provisions of the Act has been mixed. Municipalities, who were given significantly greater authority with the amendments, have, in some cases, used the authority to prevent or delay development proposals, with questionable intent. In one case a golf course was designated when the local Council received a proposal to develop it for housing.

Another flashpoint has been proposals to develop or significantly alter church properties. The government of Ontario has recently published a guideline that provides a context for the inherent conflict between religious beliefs and the civil authority over religious property that is enabled by the Act. The "Guide to Conserving Heritage Places of Worship in Ontario Communities" is part of the Ontario Heritage Toolkit. The Guide provides an understanding of how religious and heritage preservation goals can be balanced.

Properties under federal jurisdiction are also problematic; enterprises such as banking, navigation and interprovincial rail operate beyond the jurisdiction of Ontario's government. Various federal private member's bills (Heritage Railway Stations Protection Act, Heritage Lighthouse Protection Act) attempt to restrict demolition of historic properties, but all are narrow in scope and provide no protection against demolition by neglect.

== See also ==
- Archaeology in Ontario
- List of designated heritage properties in Ottawa
- Ontario Heritage Trust, formerly the Ontario Heritage Foundation
