= Animal painter =

Person who creates paintings of animals

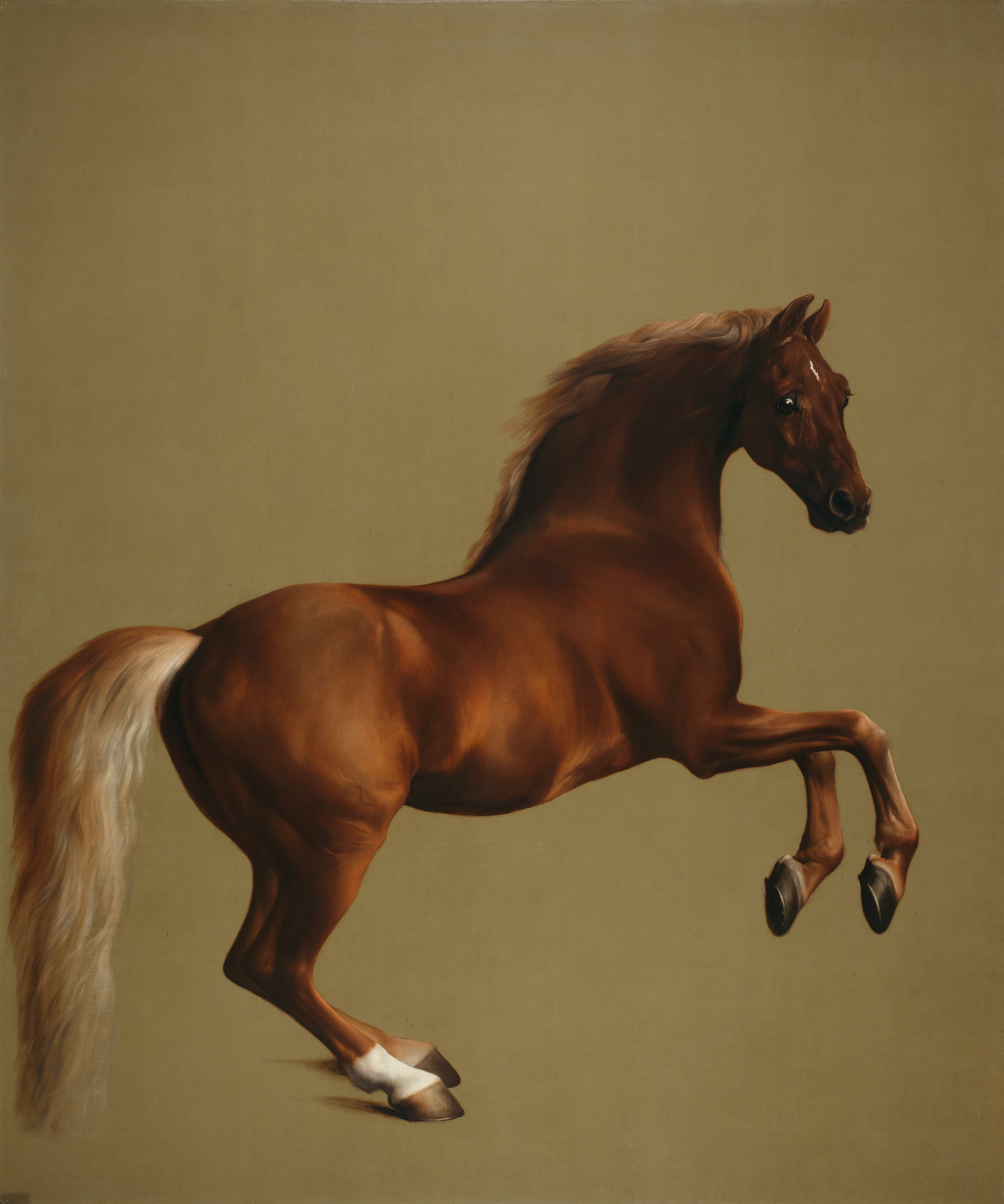
George Stubbs (1724–1806): Whistlejacket (c. 1762), National Gallery

An animal painter is an artist who specialises in (or is known for their skill in) the portrayal of animals.

The OED dates the first express use of the term "animal painter" to the mid-18th century: by English physician, naturalist and writer John Berkenhout (1726–1791). From the early 20th century, wildlife artist became a more usual term for contemporary animal painters.

== History ==
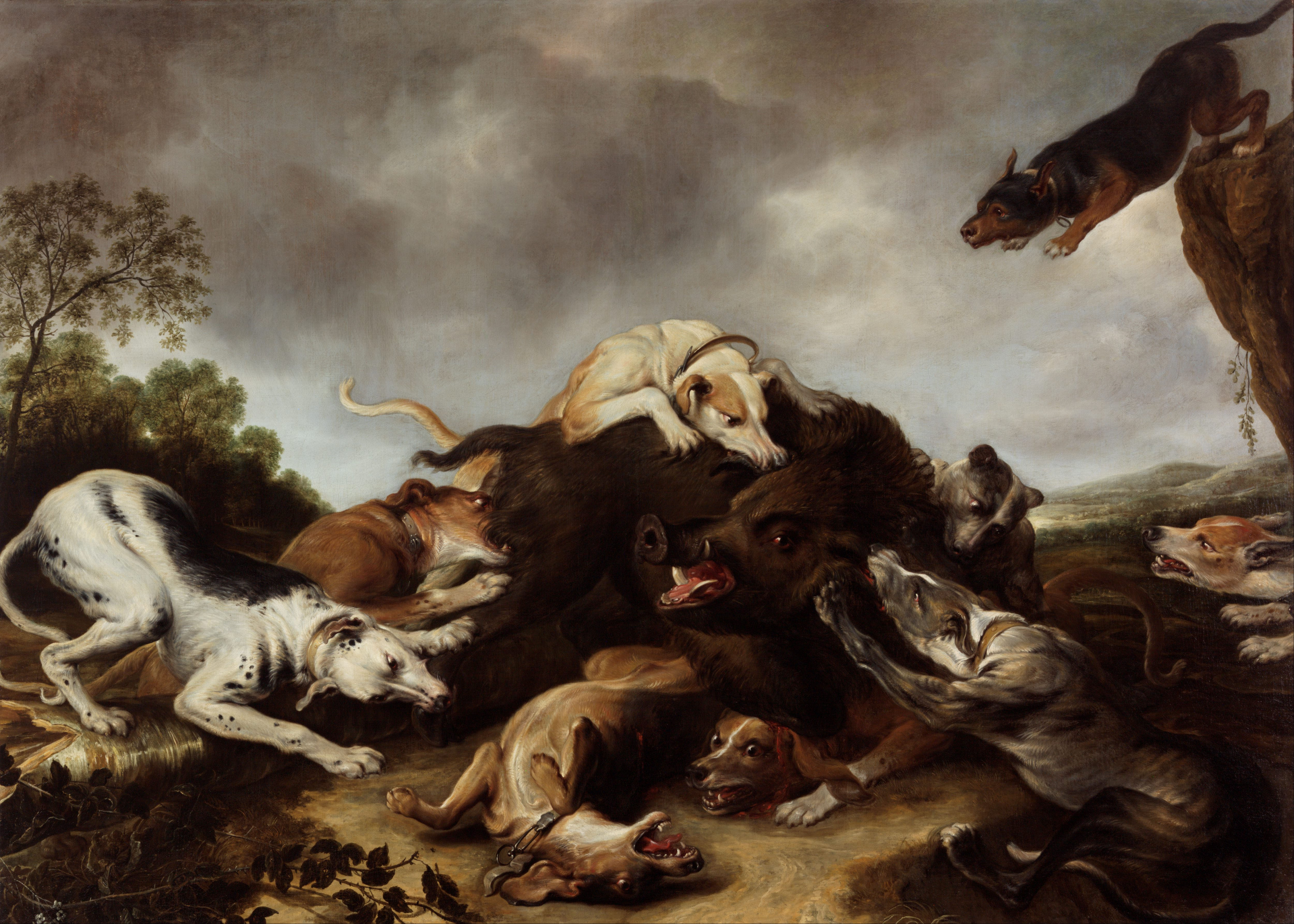
Frans Snyders and workshop, The boar hunt, c. 1650.

Especially in the 17th century, animal painters would often collaborate with other artists, who would either paint the main subject in a historical or mythological piece, or the landscape background in a decorative one. Frans Snyders, a founder of the Baroque animal painting tradition, often provided the animals, and also still lifes of food, for Peter Paul Rubens; a different landscape specialist might provide the background. The paintings by Snyders and his workshop alone typically lack humans, except in kitchen scenes, and usually show a number of animals of different species (or breeds of dog). There are about equal numbers of paintings of dead animals, usually in a kitchen setting or as hunting trophies in a landscape, and of live ones, often in ferocious combat.

In the Dutch Golden Age such specialists tended to produce smaller genre paintings concentrating on their specialism. Animal painters came lower down in the hierarchy of genres, but the best painters could make a very good living; many royal and aristocratic patrons were more interested in their subject matter than that of the more prestigious genres. Mainly in England, there were still more specialised painters from the 18th century who produced portraits of racehorses and prize specimens of livestock, whereas in France animal subjects continued to be decorative capriccios often set around garden statuary.

In 2014 Jonathan Jones of The Guardian proposed The Goldfinch (1654) by Carel Fabritius (1622–1654) as the finest animal portrait; this was not the artist's normal subject matter at all.

== Animalier ==
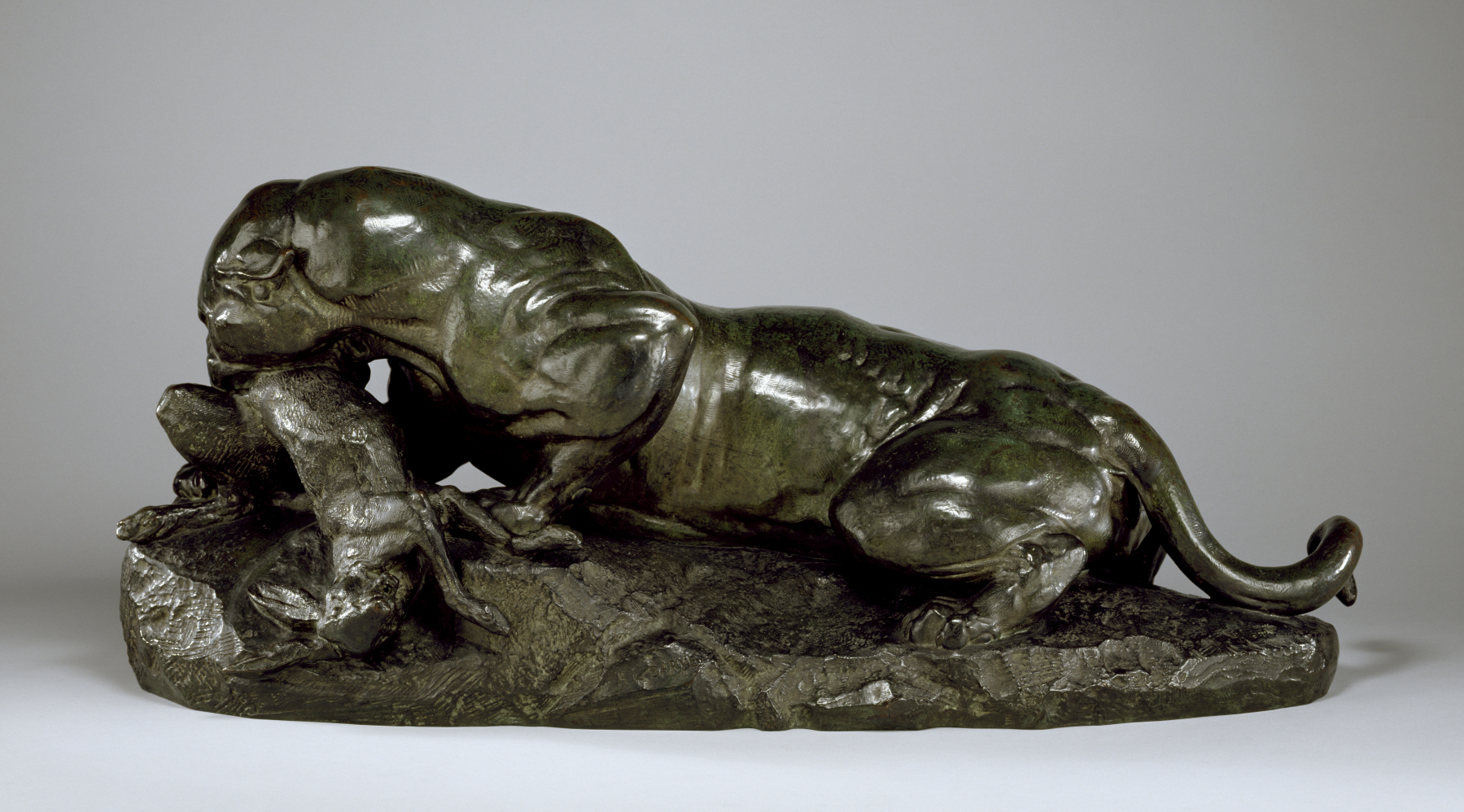
Antoine-Louis Barye, Jaguar Devouring a Hare, 1850

Animalier, as a collective plural noun, is a term used in antiques for small-scale sculptures of animals in particular (animalier bronzes), but also paintings of animals. Large numbers of these were produced - often mass-produced - in the 19th century in France and elsewhere. Many earlier examples can be found, but animalier sculpture became more popular, and reputable, in early 19th century Paris, with the works of Antoine-Louis Barye (1795–1875) - for whom the term was coined, decisively, by critics in 1831 - and Christopher Fratin (1801-1864). By the mid-19th century, a taste for animal subjects was widespread among the middle-classes.

== Wildlife conservation ==
Many modern wildlife artists or art groups hold benefits to support wildlife conservation, or participate in contests held by wildlife conservation organisations.

== Notable animal painters ==
=== Before 1800 ===
- Francis Barlow (c. 1626–1704)
- Jan Brueghel the Elder (1568–1625)
- Giovanni Benedetto Castiglione (1609–1664)
- Nicasius Bernaerts (1620–1678)
- Pieter Boel (1626–1674)
- Peter van Boucle (between 1600 & 1610–1673)
- Charles Catton (1728–1798)
- David de Coninck (c. 1644–1701+)
- Marmaduke Cradock (1660–1716)
- Thomas Davies (c. 1737–1812)
- Alexandre-François Desportes (1661–1743)
- Karel Dujardin (1622–1678)
- C. G. Finch-Davies (1875–1920)
- Jan Fyt (1611–1661)
- George Garrard (1760–1826)
- Sawrey Gilpin (1733–1807)
- Melchior d'Hondecoeter (c. 1636–1695)
- Samuel Howitt (1756/57–1822)
- Jean-Baptiste Huet (1745–1811)
- Jan Baptiste de Jonghe (1785–1844)
- William Lewin (1747–1795)
- George Morland (1763–1804)
- Balthasar Paul Ommeganck (1755–1826)
- Jean-Baptiste Oudry (1686–1755)
- Paulus Potter (1625–1654)
- Philip Reinagle (1749–1833)
- Sartorius family
- Roelant Savery (1576–1639)
- James Seymour (1702–1752)
- Charles Loraine Smith (1751–1835)
- Frans Snyders (1579–1657)
- George Stubbs (1724–1806)
- Charles Towne (1763–1840)
- Jacob Xavier Vermoelen (c. 1714–1784)
- Paul de Vos (1591/92 or 1595–1678), brother of Cornelis de Vos and brother-in-law of Frans Snyders
- James Ward (1769–1859), brother-in-law of George Morland
- Jan Weenix (between 1640 & 1649–1719)
- John Wootton (c. 1682–1764)

=== After 1800 ===
- Henry Thomas Alken (1785–1851)
- Richard Ansdell (1815–1885)
- John James Audubon (1875–1851)
- Charles Burton Barber (1845–1894)
- James Barenger (1780–1831)
- Henry Barraud (1811–1874); his son, Francis Barraud (1856–1924), painted "Nipper" the dog on the "His Master's Voice" painting
- Rosa Bonheur (1822–1899)
- John Boultbee (1753–1812)
- Edmund Bristow (1787–1876)
- Abraham Cooper (1787–1868)
- Thomas Sidney Cooper (1803–1902)
- Horatio Henry Couldery (1832–1918)
- John Dalby (1810–1865)
- Samuel Daniell (1775–1811)
- Eugène Delacroix (1798–1863)
- Herbert Dicksee (1862–1942)
- John Henry Dolph (1835–1903)
- John Emms (1844–1912)
- Ivan Efimov (1878–1959)
- Frederick William Frohawk (1861–1946)
- John Gould (1804–1881)
- Roland Green (1890/6–1972)
- Harry Hall (c. 1814–1882)
- Charles Hancock (c. 1800–1877)
- Heywood Hardy (1842–1933)
- John Frederick Herring Jr. (1820–1907)
- John Frederick Herring Sr. (1795–1865)
- William Huggins (1820–1884)
- Charles Jacque (1813–1894)
- Lucy Kemp-Welch (1869–1958)
- Frederick William Keyl (1823–1871)
- Louis Klingender (1861–1950)
- Charles R. Knight (1874–1953)
- Wilhelm Kuhnert (1865–1926)
- Edwin Landseer (1802–1873)
- Bruno Liljefors (1860–1931)
- George Edward Lodge (1860–1954)
- Matilda Lotz (1858–1923)
- Wilhelm Kuhnert (1825–1896)
- John Guille Millais (1865–1931)
- Sir Alfred Munnings (1878–1959)
- Ramsay Richard Reinagle (1775–1862)
- Jan Hendrik Scheltema (1861–1941)
- Prideaux John Selby (1788–1867)
- Vasily Vatagin (1883–1969)
- Christopher Webb Smith (1793–1871)
- Charles Tunnicliffe (1901–1979)
- Arthur Wardle (1860–1949)
- Herbert William Weekes (1841–1914)

=== Modern ===
Modern wildlife art painters include:

- Thierry Bisch (b. 1953)
- Elizabeth Butterworth (b. 1949) - parrots
- Charles Church (b. 1970)
- John Clymer (1907–1989)
- Kim Donaldson (b. 1952)
- Charles Fracé (1926–2005)
- Gary Hodges (b. 1954)
- Ron Like (b. 1935 )
- Lanford Monroe (1950–2000)
- Stephen D. Nash (b. 1954)
- David Nurney (b. 1959)
- David Quinn (b. 1959)
- Mark Upton (b. 1964)
- Diana Joseph
- Sue Coleman
- J. S. Munnolli (b. 1940)

Forerunners of modern wildlife art sculpture include:

- Rembrandt Bugatti (1884–1916)
- François Pompon (1855–1933)

Modern wildlife art sculptors include:

- Andrew Martz (1924–2002)
- Tessa Pullan (b. 1953)
- John Rattenbury Skeaping (1901–1980)
- Jo Walker

== Gallery ==
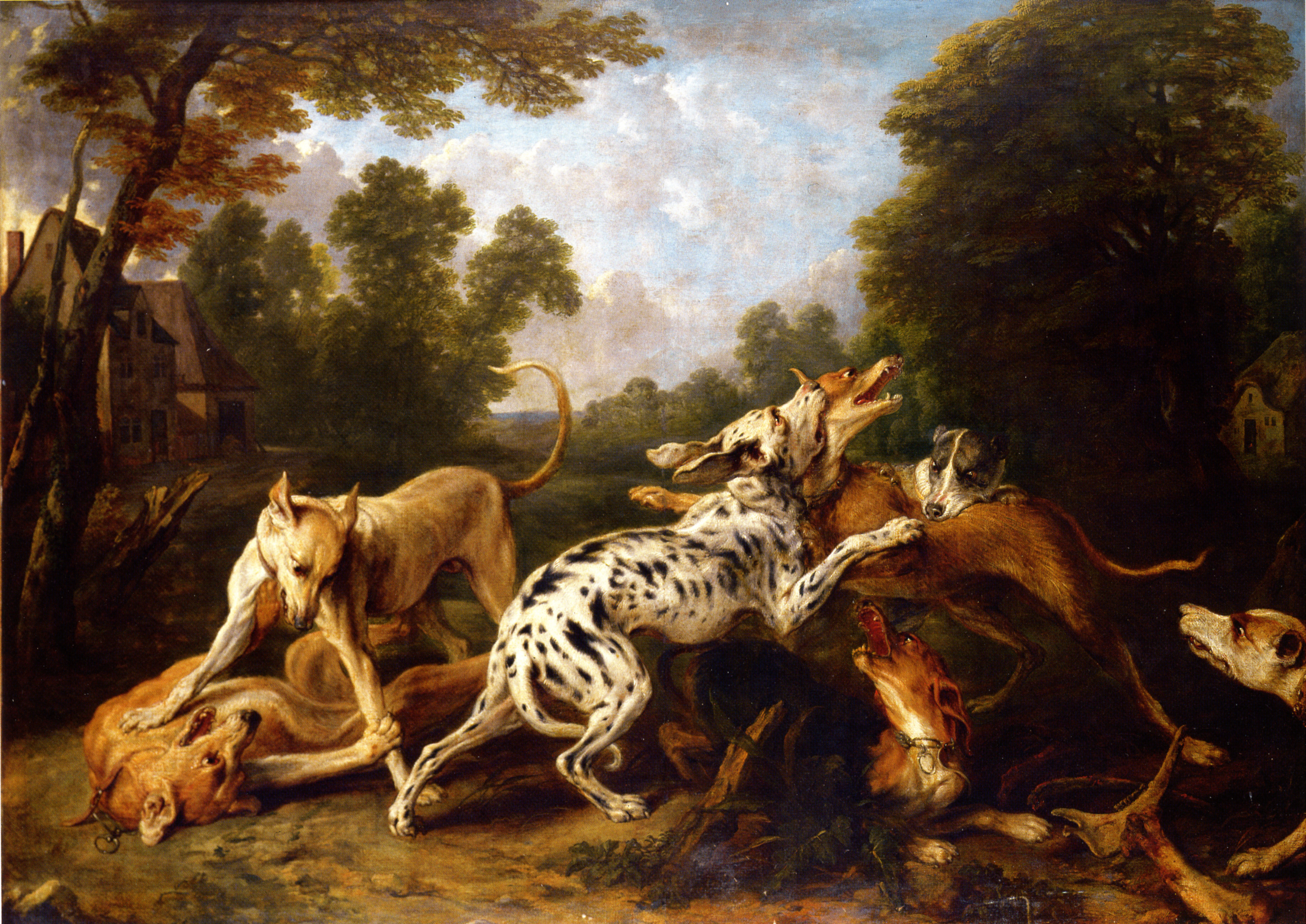
Dogs fighting by Frans Snyders, who probably left the landscape background to another kind of specialist.

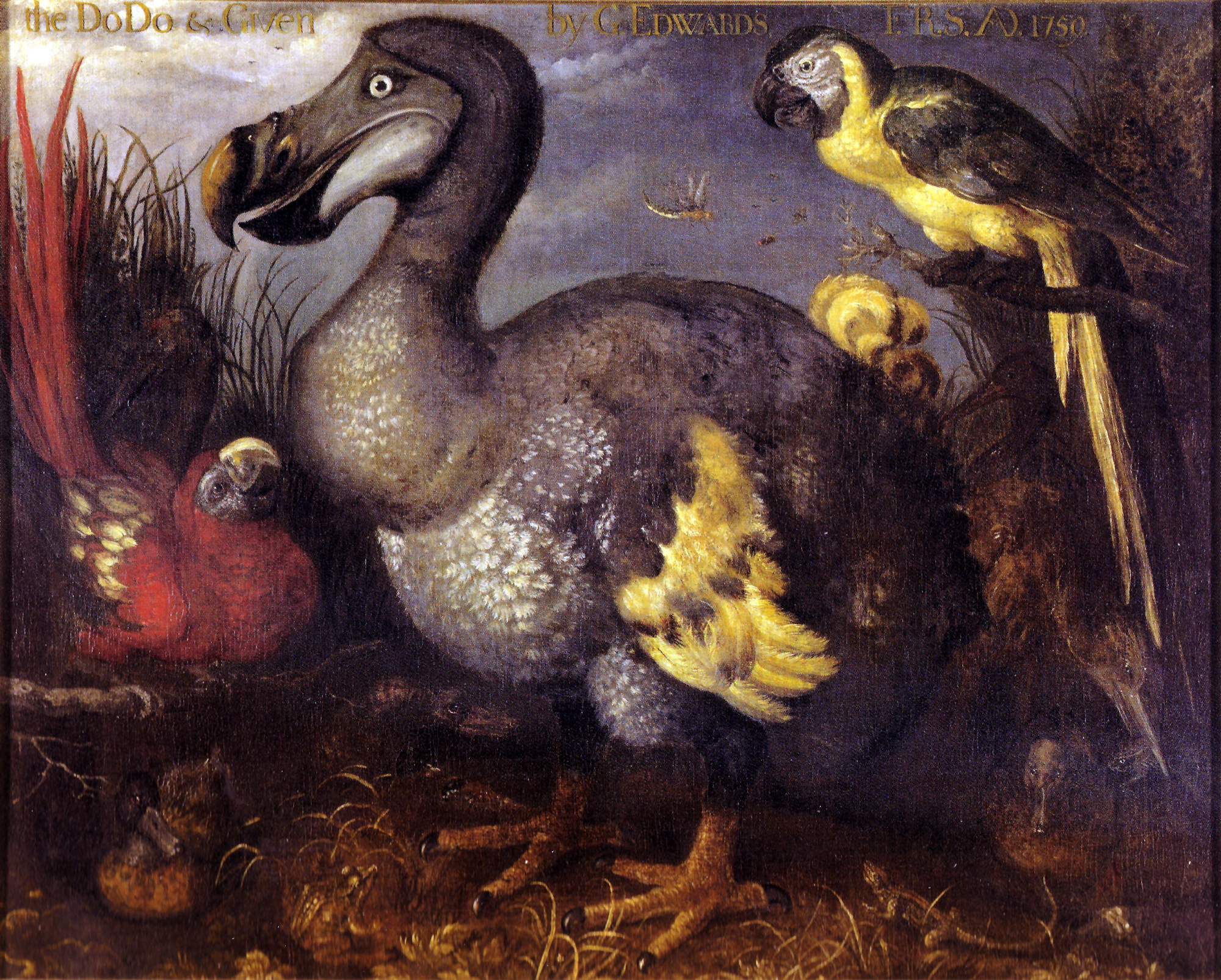
Edwards's Dodo (1626) by Savery; Natural History Museum, London.

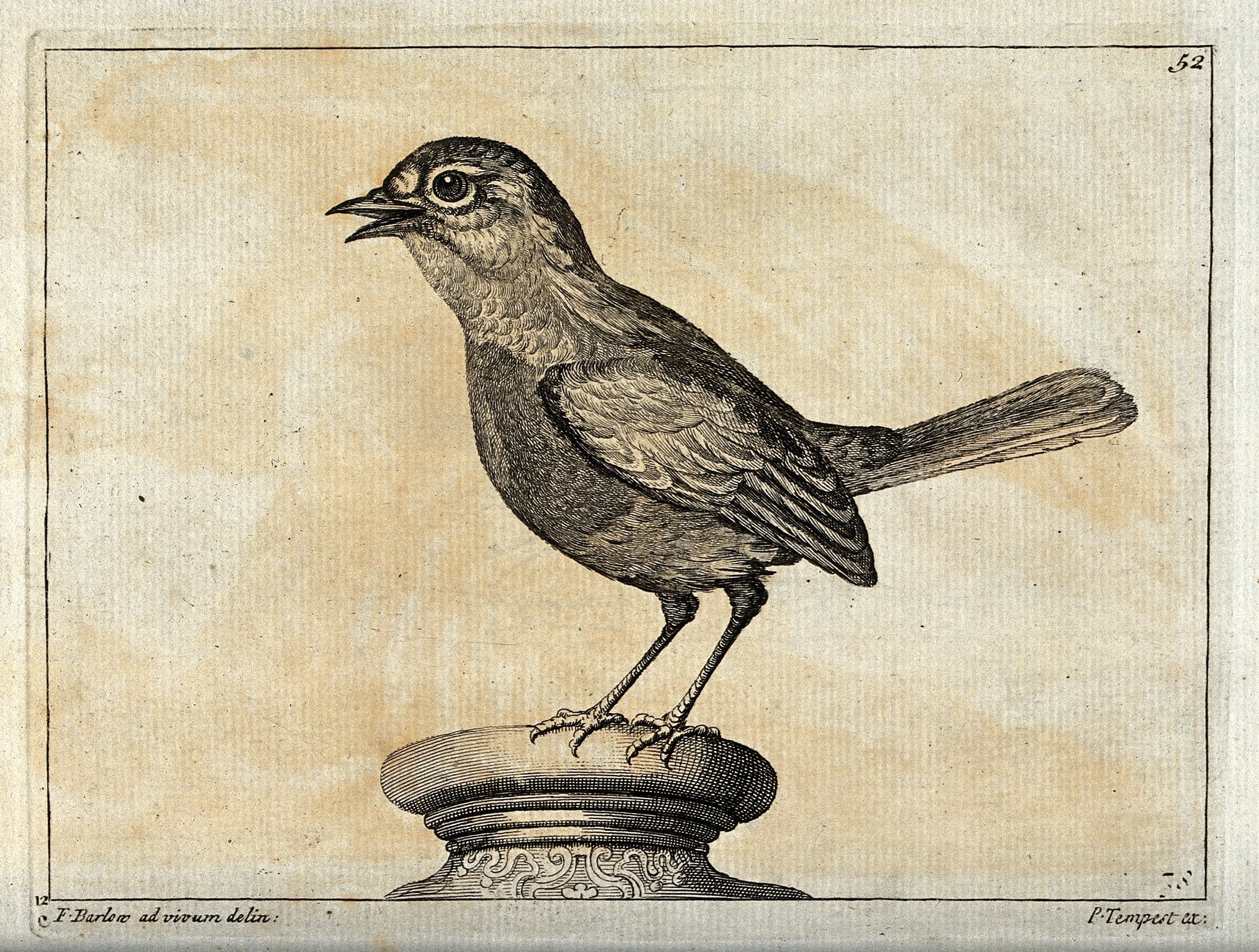
A sparrow (c. 1690) by Francis Barlow; engraving by Pierce Tempest.

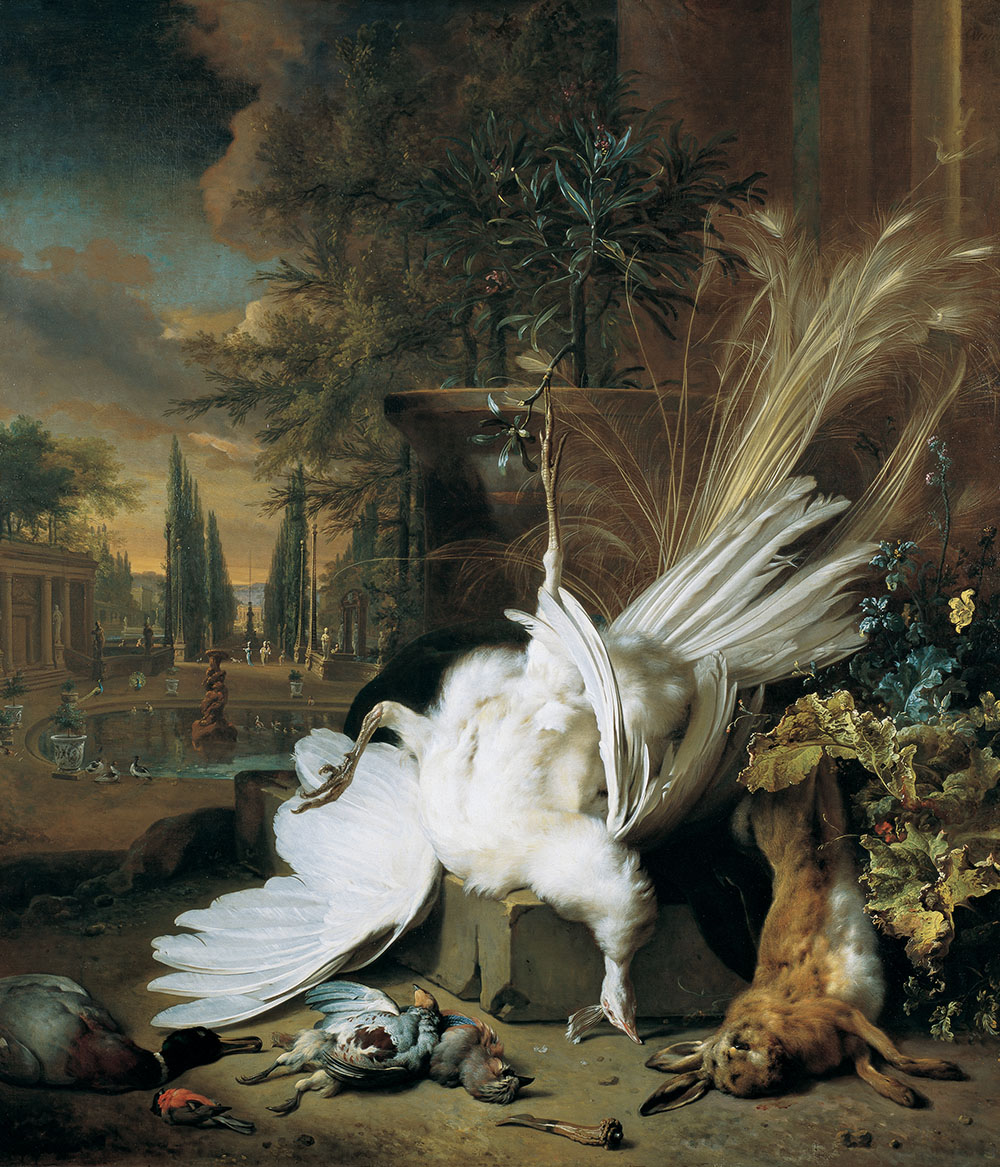
A typical composition of dead game from 1692 by Jan Weenix, probably an overdoor for a country house.

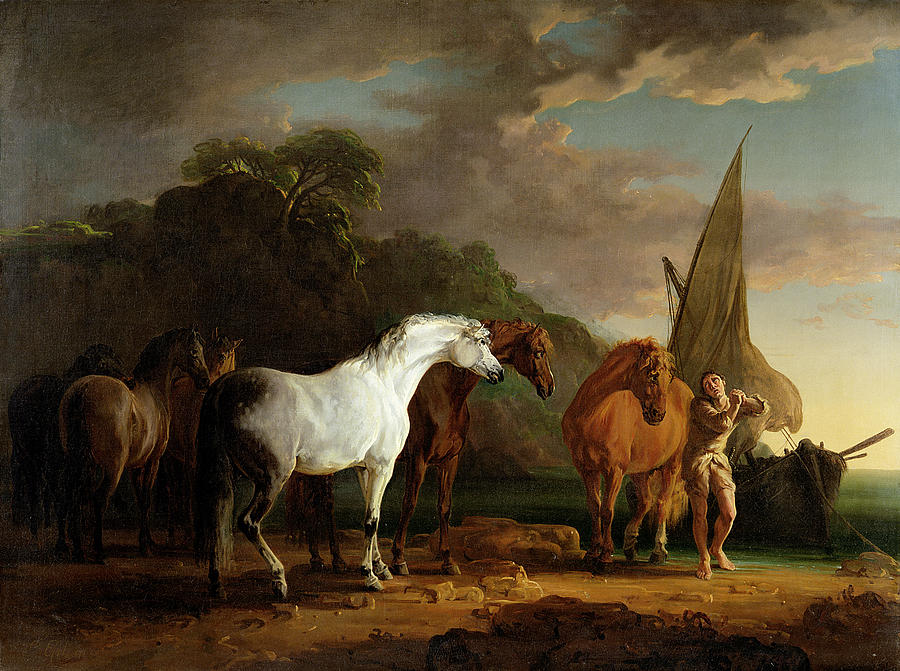
Sawrey Gilpin's Gulliver taking his final leave of the land of the Houyhnhnms (1769).

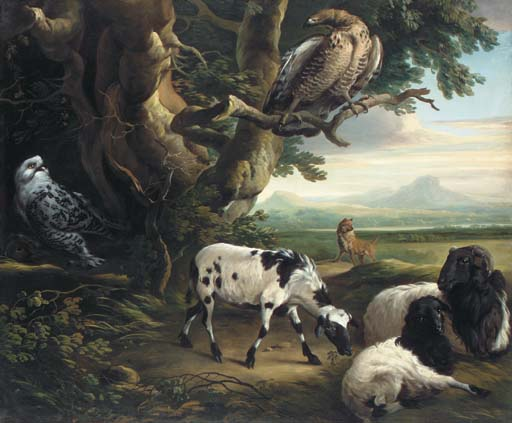
Philip Reinagle's Birds of Prey, Goats and a Wolf, in a Landscape.

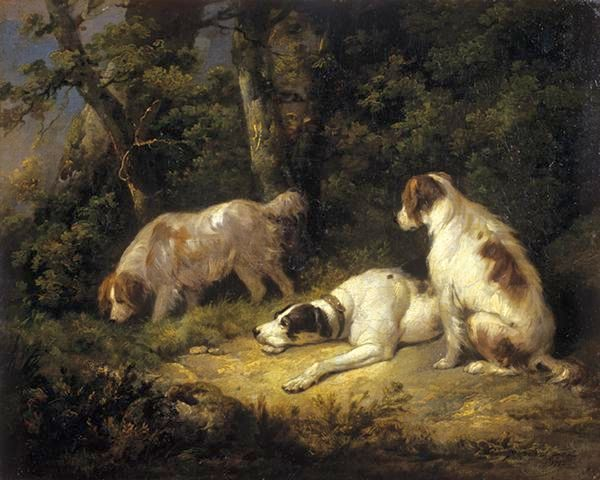
Morland's Dogs (1792); Wawel Castle, Poland.

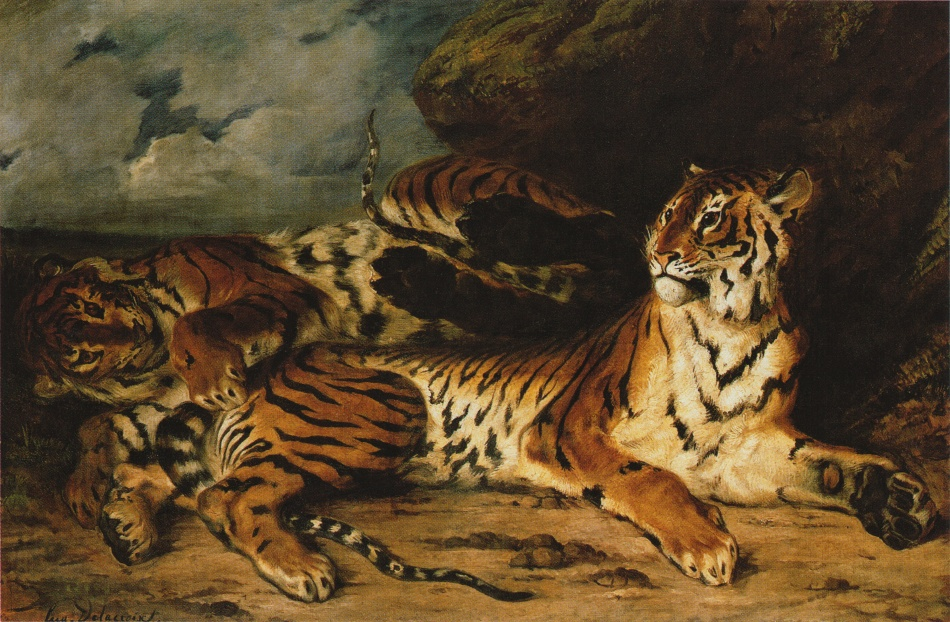
Eugène Delacroix, A Young Tiger Playing with Its Mother, 1830, Louvre.

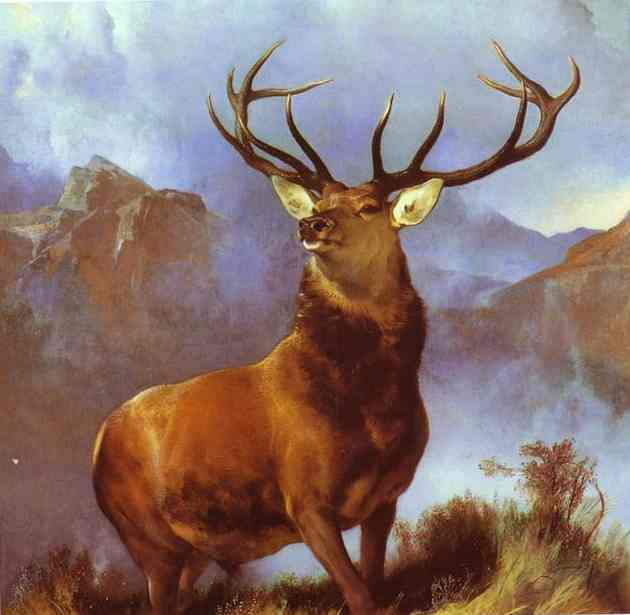
Landseer's Monarch of the Glen (1851); National Museum of Scotland.

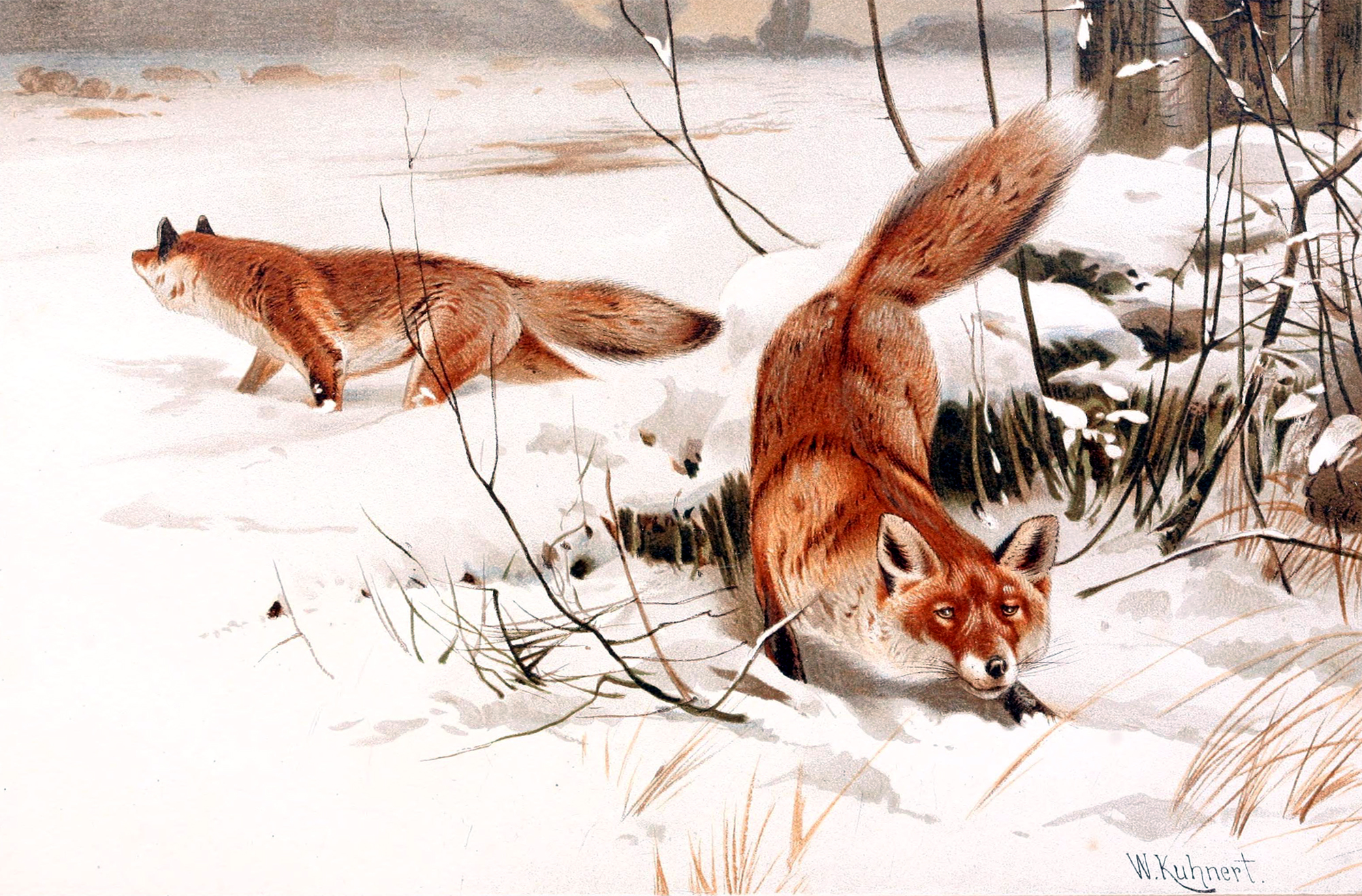
Common foxes in the snow (1893) by Wilhelm Kuhnert.

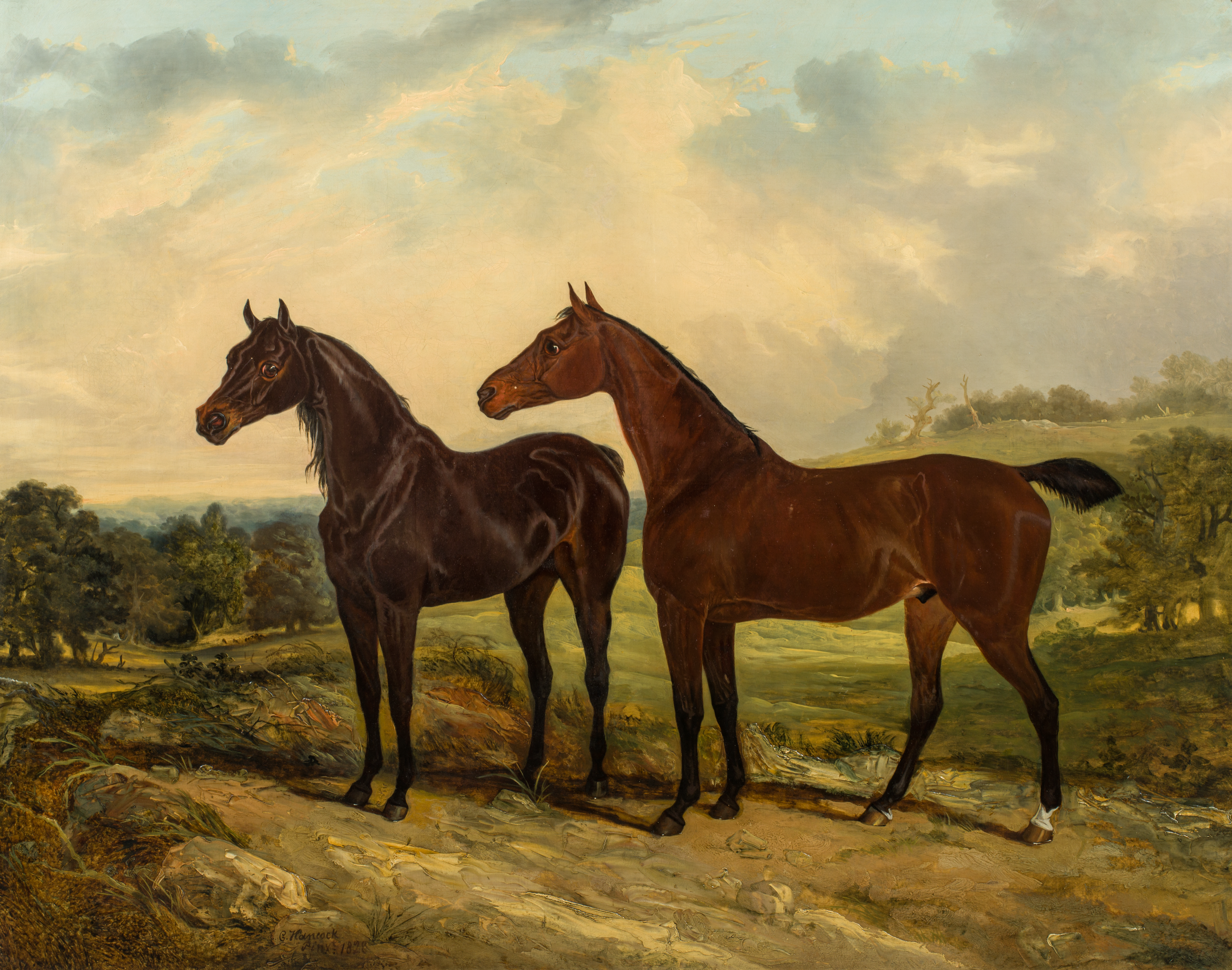
Two thoroughbreds in a wide landscape (1828) by Charles Hancock.

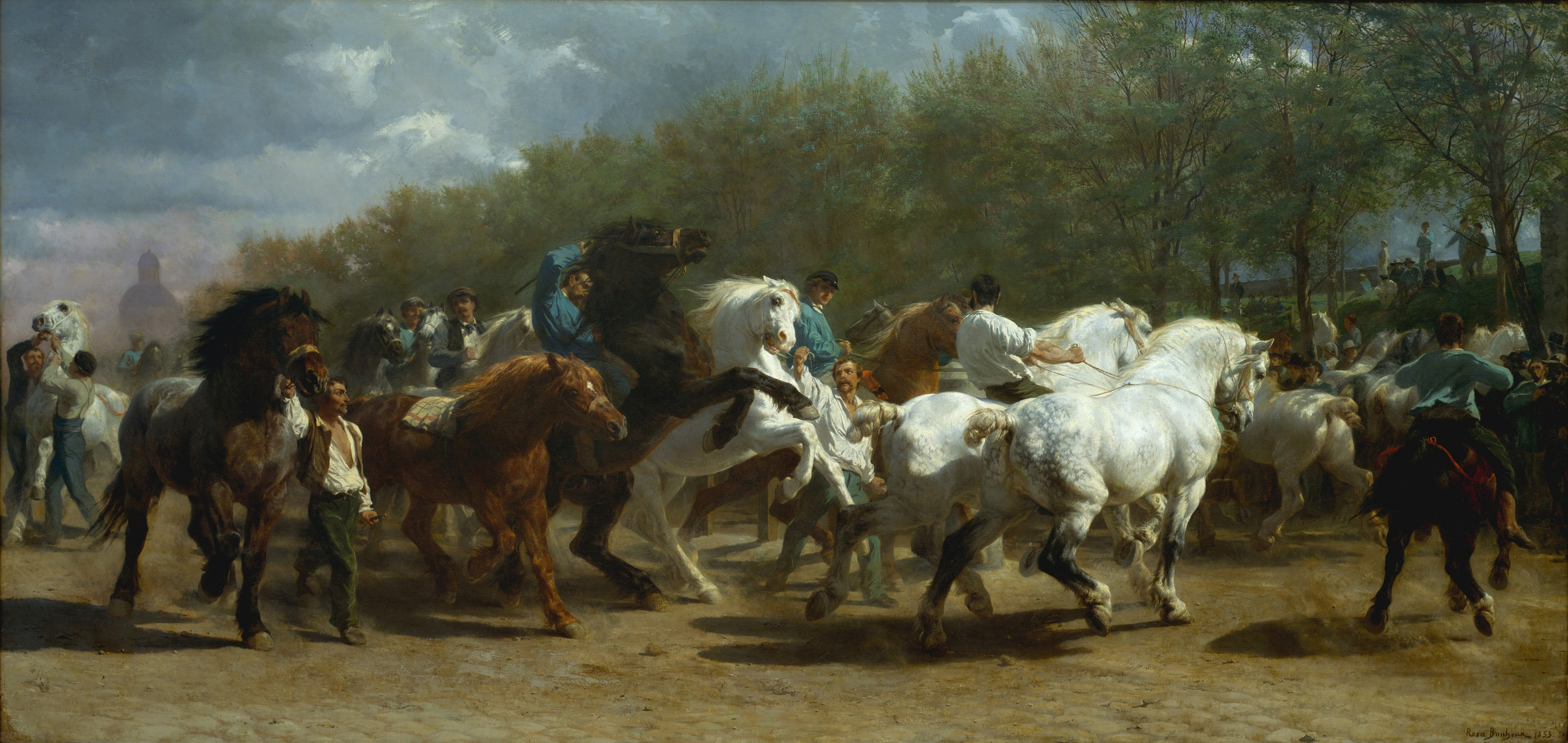
The Horse Fair (1522-55), by Rosa Bonheur
