= Horatio Henry Couldery =

English painter

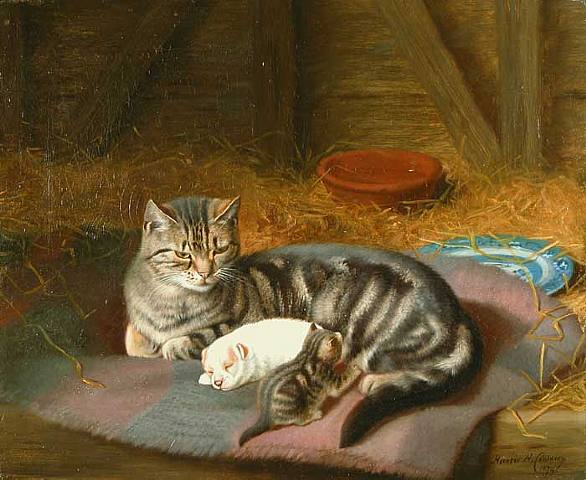
"The Unexpected Guest" by Couldery

Horatio Henry Couldery (1832–1918) was an English animal painter and illustrator noted especially for his depictions of domestic cats, kittens and dogs. He was born in Lewisham, London, and trained as a cabinetmaker before abandoning that trade to study art at the Royal Academy of Arts, and exhibited there as well as at the British Institution, the Royal Society of British Artists gallery in Suffolk Street, and other notable galleries both in the capital and the regions.

In 1861 he exhibited his first piece at the Royal Academy, entitled "On Dangerous Ground." This painting, which features two tabby kittens discovering a table with fish, is in the collection at Glanmore National Historic Site in Belleville, Ontario Canada. Glanmore has an artifact collection known as the Couldery Collection. Horatio H. Couldery's brother and sister-in-law Bertram and Cecilia Couldery travelled to Belleville in the 1880s and kept a second home there. Their collection of fine art, decorative objects and furniture was given to the City of Belleville in the 1950s and is housed at Glanmore National Historic Site. The collection includes 42 paintings by Horatio Henry Couldery, and is considered to be the world's largest collection of his work held in public trust.

He worked as a professional artist, illustrating children’s books and greeting cards as well as creating commissioned pieces. Couldery painted with a sense of humour, often portraying animals in mischievous situations that successfully captured the character and personality of beloved pets. He was noted for his skillful depiction of the texture of animal fur in minute detail. His work, with its great attention to detail, was highly regarded by art critic John Ruskin. Ruskin reviewed a cat painting exhibited in 1875 and said it was "“…quite the most skillful piece of minutiae and Dureresque painting in the exhibition – (it cannot rightly be seen without a lens): and in its sympathy with kitty nature…unsurpassable.”

Couldery's first wife Rachel Elizabeth died a few years after their marriage. In 1874 he married Ellen Angus Homes and they had six children. His art career flourished until about 1893. Many websites incorrectly state 1893 as his date of death. According to death registration he actually died February 4, 1918, at Elizabeth Villa, Addington Grove, Sydenham County, Kent.

== Gallery ==
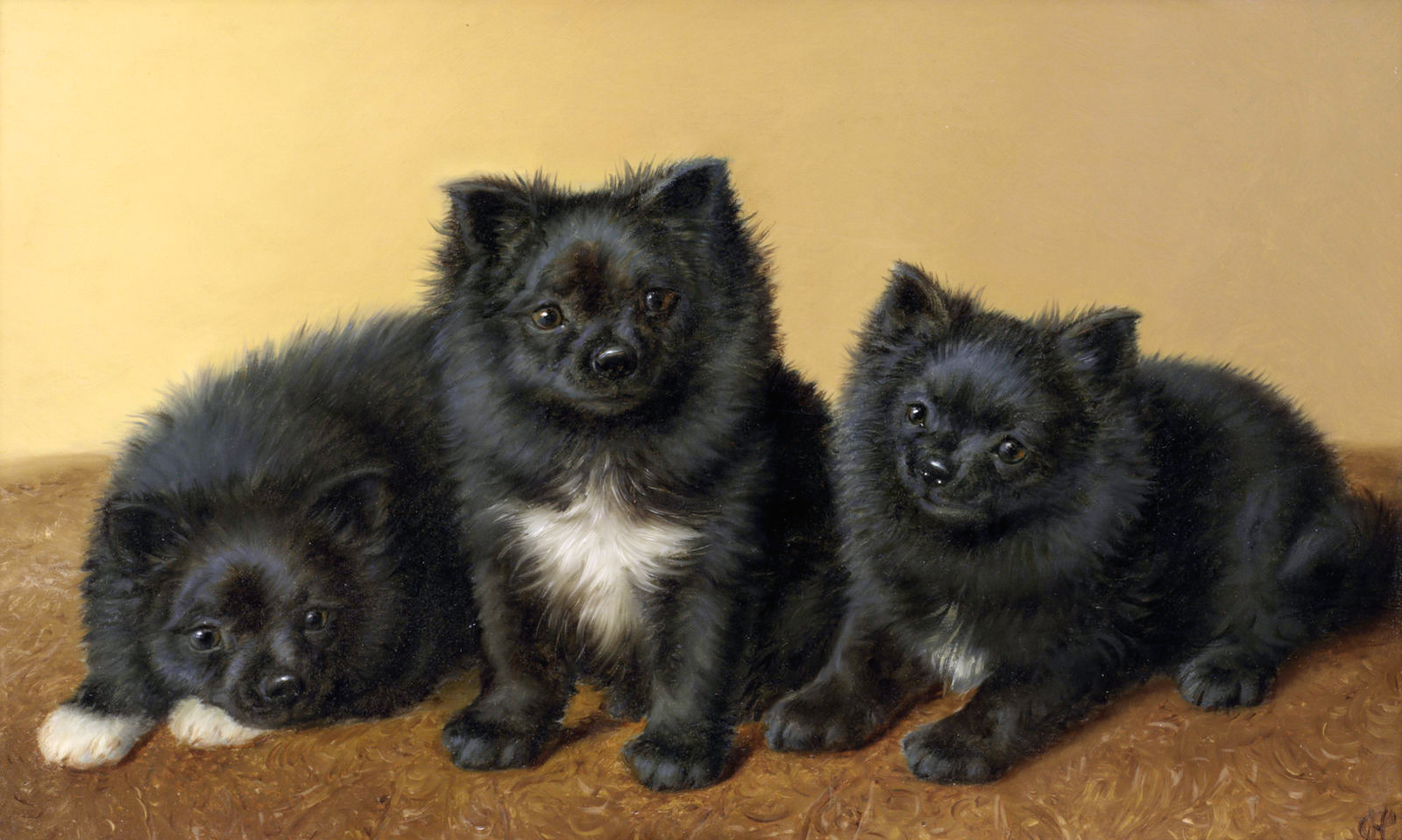
A trio of Pomeranians, before 1918

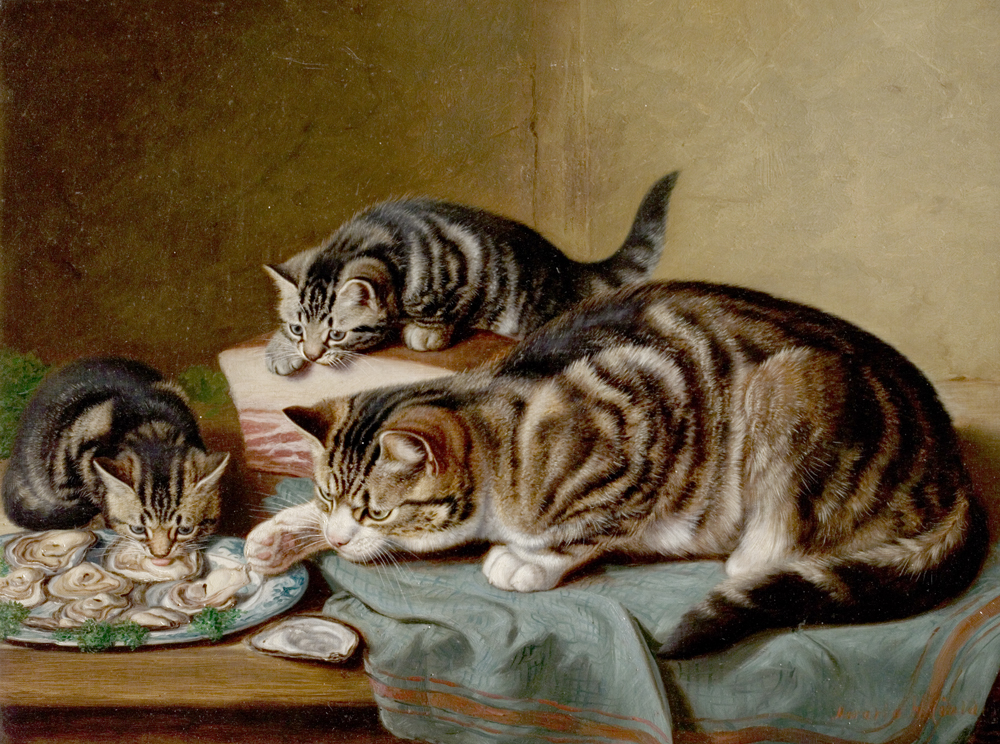
An Oyster Supper, 1882

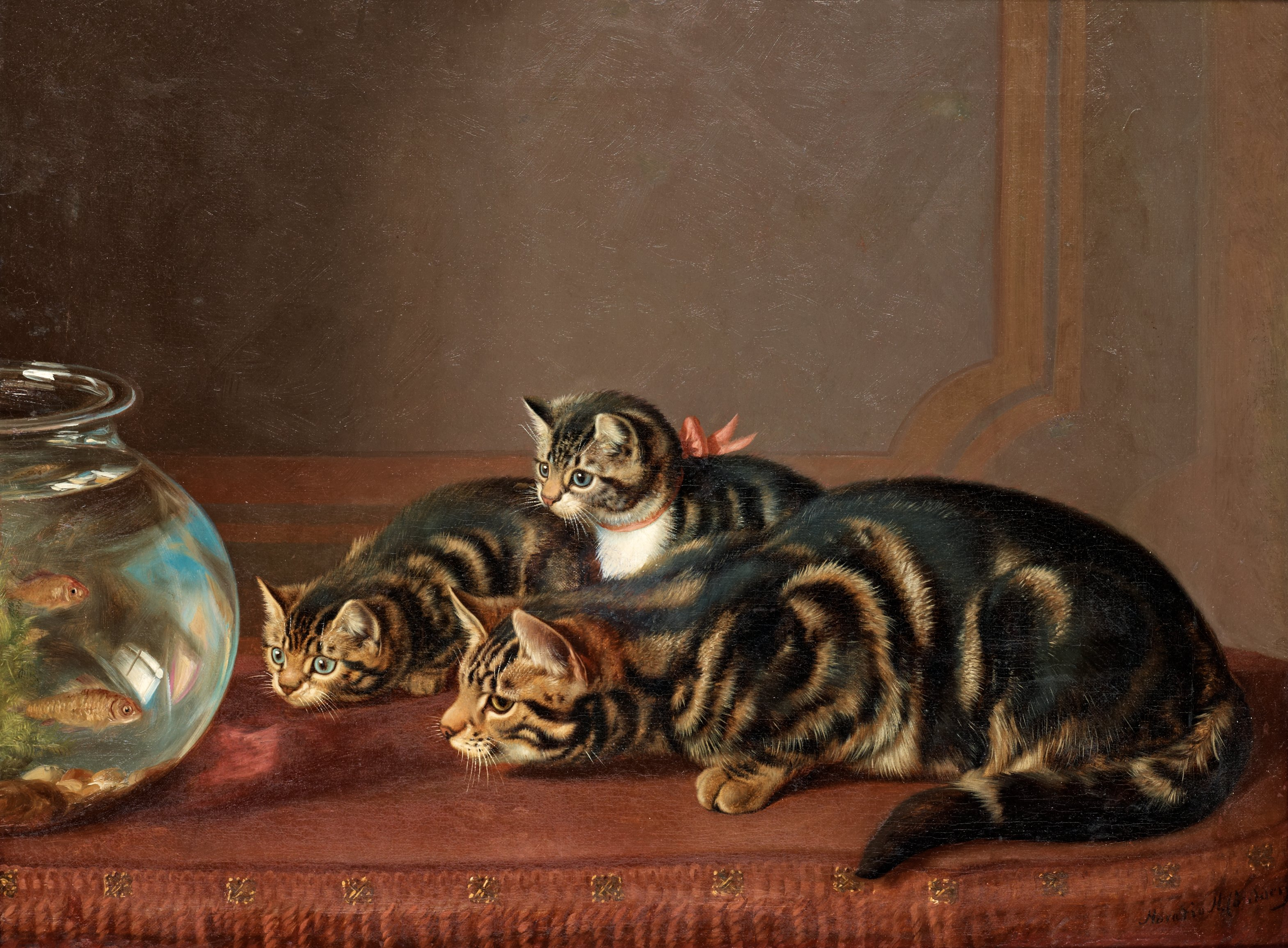
Cats by a fishbowl

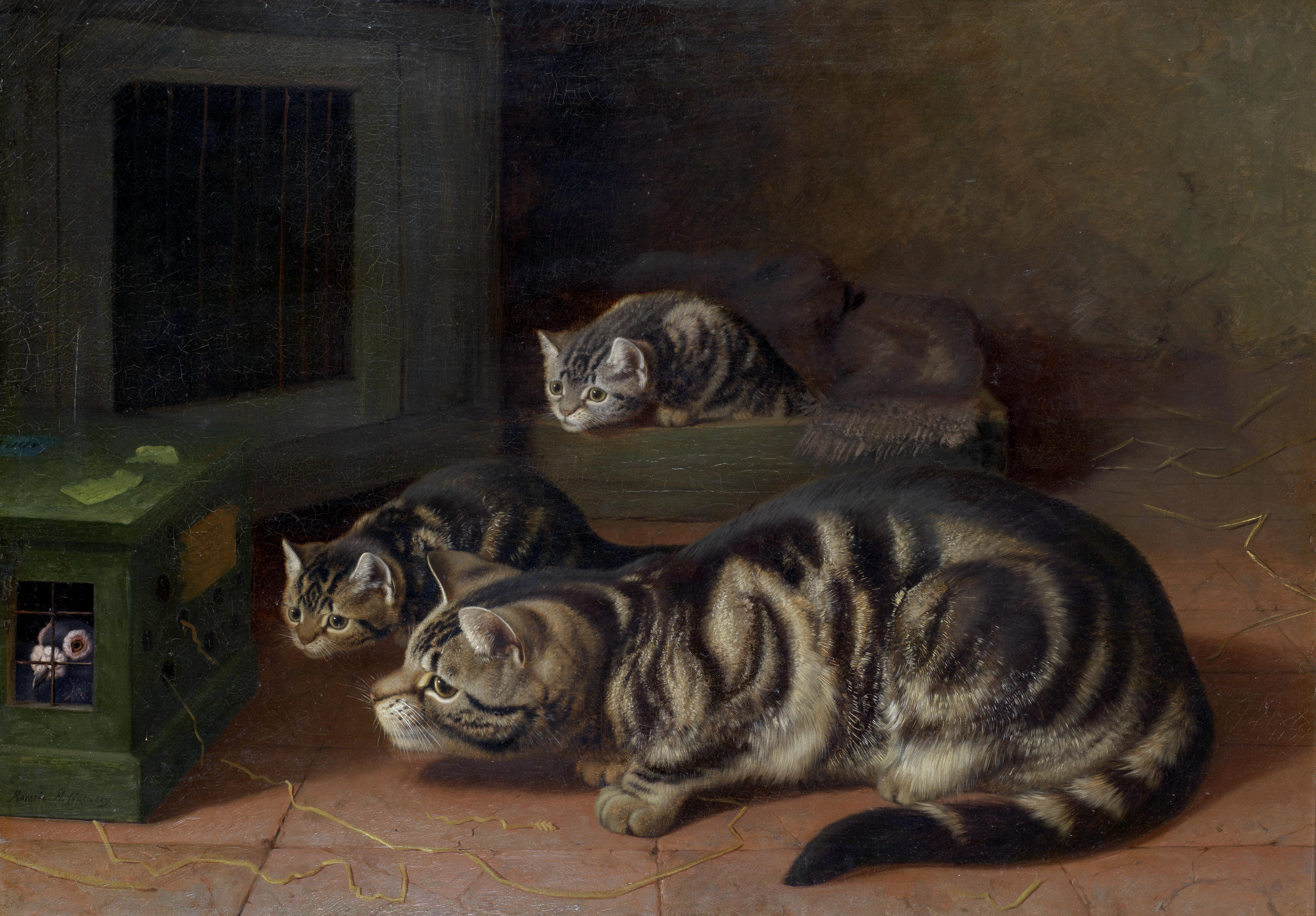
Curiosity, 1893
