= Kim Donaldson =

Kim Donaldson may refer to:

- Kim Donaldson (artist) (born 1952), Zimbabwean artist
- Kim Donaldson (rugby union) (born 1983), Canadian rugby union player
