= Charles Fracé =

American wildlife artist

- Nature's Window, a 1992 profile of Fracé and collection of his works; the painting on the cover, Fleeting Encounter, was painted in 1988.
- Born: Charles Fracé; 18 February 1926; Mauch Chunk, Pennsylvania, U.S.
- Died: 16 December 2005 (aged 79); Nashville, Tennessee, U.S.
- Education: Philadelphia Museum School of Art
- Known for: Wildlife painter
- Notable work: African Leopard Cub (1978); Snow Leopard (1975); Cougar (1978); Clouded Leopard (1979); Fleeting Encounter (1988); Unrivaled (1994)
- Movement: Wildlife, realism

Charles Fracé (February 18, 1926 – December 16, 2005) was an American wildlife artist whose work was featured in more than 500 exhibitions, including a solo exhibition at the National Museum of Natural History of the Smithsonian Institution in Washington, D.C. Fracé painted over a hundred paintings from which limited edition prints were produced, which were consistently popular with collectors.

== Early life and education ==
Fracé was born in 1926 in Mauch Chunk, Pennsylvania in present-day Jim Thorpe in eastern Pennsylvania, He lost his father at a young age, and lived with his mother and grandparents. Fracé began drawing at five and taught himself to paint when he was fifteen. His first painting was a portrait of Jesus, which was followed the following year by a portrait of Abraham Lincoln, which was presented to his high school principal and which remains in the town museum. He also played alto horn and trumpet in the school band, and was in the school soccer and basketball teams.

After working at odd jobs for several years, he was persuaded to apply for a scholarship at the Philadelphia Museum School of Art. His self-instructed talent earned him the opportunity, and he worked his way through school, including a stint as an extra for the Philadelphia Opera. In 1952, he graduated with honors from the Philadelphia Museum School of Art.

== Career ==
In 1955, Fracé began a professional career as a freelance illustrator in New York City. After struggling to land his first paid artist job, and working for a year for the local office of The Saturday Evening Post, he befriended wildlife photographer Shelly Grossman. After Fracé sought advice from respected wildlife illustrator Al Dorne, who told Fracé, "stick with it", Fracé joined Grossman on an assignment in Weeki Wachee, Florida, where Fracé found the inspiration to paint his first three wildlife paintings, a Great Horned Owl, Sparrow Hawk, and Pondicherry Vulture.

Fracé continued painting in this genre, and within the next few years he became one of the nation's most sought-after illustrators of wildlife. During this time he began a collaboration with wildlife photographer and preservationist Roger A. Caras. In 1966 Caras published Last Chance on Earth: A Requiem for Wildlife, with illustrations by Fracé. The pair went on to collaborate on twelve more books, the last one being Source of the Thunder: The Biography of a California condor, in 1991.

=== Wildlife painter ===
At the urging of his wife Elke, Fracé took a sabbatical from commercial illustrating in 1972 and began painting for his own enjoyment. He proceeded to paint from memory an American eagle he had observed at Walking Dunes on the coast of Long Island. Unsure that the painting represented how he really felt about wildlife he put the painting into storage in a closet. His wife took the painting to a gallery in Mattituck, New York, seeking a professional opinion and with the urging of the gallery owners left it with them for display. It sold in two hours.

In 1973, he left the world of commercial illustration and concentrated on producing wildlife oil paintings. Also that year he started a business relationship with Frame House, a publisher of wildlife prints. His first two limited edition print releases, African Lion and Tiger, sold out shortly after release. In 1974, he relocated Nashville, Tennessee, and embarked on a five-week trip to Africa, where he refined his skill in painting big cats, which became one of the hallmarks of his work. Early in his career, Frace adopted a principle called "the Three A's, in which he demands of himself that his paintings be Artistic, Alive, and Accurate".

Over the next two decades, over 100 of Fracé's paintings were issued as limited edition prints, making him one of the most successful wildlife artists of all time. By the early 1980s, Fracé was described as "America's premier wildlife artist". A 1981 article described his "stature as a painter of the world's most beautiful animals is virtually unrivaled", and noted that "Fracé never paints an animal he has not seen for himself or touched with his own hand". He was commissioned to paint the official portrait of 9Lives mascot Morris the Cat in 1976, and by the National Retriever Club to paint their 1983 stamp print.

In 1982, Fracé was profiled in the book, The Art of Charles Fracé, and a much more substantial profile, Nature's Window—Charles Fracé, was published in 1992. His work was also profiled in magazines including U.S. Art and Wildlife Art News. Fracé's paintings have been highlighted as exemplary of techniques used to capture difficult features such as the dense fur of the grizzly bear, and the feathers of birds in flight. In 1987, Fracé established The Fracé Fund For Wildlife Preservation, a charitable fund supporting wildlife organizations. Their first donations was of trees and foliage plants to Zoo Atlanta.

In 1991, he was selected as one of four inaugural members of U.S. Art magazine's "Artists' Hall of Fame", and from November 1992 to May 1993, the Smithsonian Institution's National Museum of Natural History in Washington, D.C., hosted a one-man exhibition of his work, The American Wildlife Image and Charles Fracé, that featured over 36 of his paintings.

== Selected recognition and awards ==
- 1978: Who's Who in American Art - R. R. Bowker Co.
- 1981: Contemporary Personages Encyclopedia - Academia Italia delle Arti e del Lavaro, Parma, Italy
- 1982: Denver Museum of Natural History, Denver, CO - Special Award of Merit for Cougar

== Personal life and death ==
Fracé and his wife Elke had two sons, Jeffrey and Roger. Fracé died in Nashville, Tennessee, where he had lived since 1974, at the age of 79.

== Bibliography ==
- Davis, Bruce Henry (1982). The Art of Charles Fracé. New York: American Masters Foundation. ASIN B000P0QZ5Y.
- Davis, Bruce Henry (1992). Nature's Window: Charles Fracé. New York: American Masters Foundation. ISBN 1-880044-01-3.
