= Roger A. Caras =

American author and naturalist (1928–2001)

- Born: Roger Andrew Caras; May 24, 1928; Methuen, Massachusetts, United States
- Died: February 18, 2001 (aged 72); United States
- Occupations: Author, Television/Radio personality, Animal activist
- Notable work: ABC News Correspondent; CBS Radio personality Author; International speaker Dog show host

Roger Andrew Caras (May 24, 1928 – February 18, 2001) was an American naturalist, animal welfare activist, wildlife photographer and writer.

Known as the host of the annual Westminster Kennel Club Dog Show, Caras was the author of more than 70 books, a veteran of network television programs including Nightline, ABC World News Tonight and 20/20 before devoting himself to work as president of the American Society for the Prevention of Cruelty to Animals.

== Biography ==
=== Early life and education ===
Born May 24, 1928, in the rural town of Methuen, Massachusetts, Caras was raised in a family that encouraged love of animals. His parents allowed him to foster a menagerie of pets, and during the Depression he went to work at the age of 10 to help pay for his pets' upkeep. His first job, working in the stables of an SPCA shelter, was his first experience with animal rescue in the shelter's haven for abused horses. He completed his education at Boston's Huntington Preparatory School and immediately enlisted in the U.S. Army near the end of World War II.

Caras returned to Boston after his tour of duty and then enrolled as a zoology major at Northeastern University. In 1950, he transferred to Case Western Reserve University, Cleveland, Ohio, but interrupted his education for military service again, this time in the Korean War from 1950 to 1952.

=== Career ===
Caras returned to civilian life as a West Coast resident, attending the University of Southern California, where he earned a degree, not in zoology but in cinema, and stepped from academic life to executive-level work in the motion picture industry. During 15 years in the film world, Caras held a number of assignments, including serving as press secretary for actress Joan Crawford, and from 1965 to 1969 as vice president of Stanley Kubrick's production company, Hawk Films, working with Kubrick and Arthur C. Clarke on the science fiction epic 2001: A Space Odyssey. During his Hollywood years, Caras also launched his writing career, contributing articles on animal and environmental issues to such periodicals as Audubon and publishing his first book, Antarctica: Land of Frozen Time, in 1962.

In 1964, Caras made his broadcasting debut on the NBC News program The Today Show, spending nearly a decade as the program's "house naturalist." His skills in broadcasting, research, biology, and zoology led to his acceptance as one of the media's best-regarded animal authorities. He was sought out by the Walt Disney conglomerate as a consultant on their Florida Animal Kingdom park.

Acting as a special correspondent, Caras reported from around the globe on a variety of animal and environmental issues that ranged from exposes on laboratory animals to the plight of the endangered giant panda in China and to investigation of the black market commerce in exotic animals and poaching.

Caras spent from 1975 to 1992 as a regularly featured reporter on ABC Evening News (later World News Tonight with Peter Jennings,) as well as contributing to Nightline, 20/20, and Good Morning America. He also hosted radio programs, including Pets and Wildlife on CBS, Report from the World of Animals on NBC, and the ABC series The Living World.

Caras won an Emmy Award for his reporting. His books include The Bond and his last book, Going for the Blue: Inside the World of Show Dogs and Dog Shows, which was published in time for the 2001 Westminster competition.

Caras’s work with and on behalf of animals led to his 1991 election as the 14th president of the American Society for the Prevention of Cruelty to Animals, the oldest humane-treatment-of-animals organization in the United States. During his tenure, the ASPCA expanded its care, protection and education programs, and adopted a number of internal practices to improve its work. Caras retired in 1999 and became president emeritus, acting as a consultant and public speaker for the organization.

=== Death and afterward ===
Caras made his home in Freeland, Baltimore County, Maryland, where he and his wife, Jill Langdon Barclay, maintained a farm that became home for a variety of animals. In 2001, in the last year of his life, Caras shared his farm with 12 dogs (7 Greyhounds, 3 retrievers and 2 hounds), nine cats, all of mixed origin, five horses, two cows, a pair of alpacas and a llama. Caras died on February 18, 2001, from complications of a heart attack he had in December. After his death, his wife, his son, Dr. Barclay Caras, and daughter, Pamela Caras, requested that people wishing to honor his memory donate memorial contributions to the ASPCA in his name.

== Selected works ==
=== Books ===
- Antarctica; land of frozen time. With special charts by A. Peter Ianuzzi. 1962
- Dangerous to man; wild animals: a definitive study of their reputed dangers to man, by Roger A. Caras. 1964
- Wings of gold: the story of United States naval aviation, by Roger A. Caras. 1965
- Last Chance on Earth: A Requiem for Wildlife, by Roger A. Caras. Illustrated by Charles Fracé. 1966
- Custer Wolf; biography of an American renegade, by Roger A. Caras. Illustrated by Charles Fracé. 1966
- Loup blanc de Custer, roman [par] Roger Caras. [Traduit de l'américain par Yves Braínville.] 1967
- North American Mammals: Fur-Bearing Animals of the United States and Canada, by Roger A. Caras. 1967
- Sarang: the story of a Bengal tiger and of two children in search of a miracle, a novel, by Roger A. Caras. 1968
- Monarch of Deadman Bay; the life and death of a Kodiak bear, by Roger A. Caras. 1969
- Animal children, edited by Roger Caras. Foreword by Roger Tory Peterson. 1970
- Panther! Illus. by Charles Fracé. 1970
- Source of the thunder; the biography of a California condor. Illus. by Charles Fracé. Foreword by Roland C. Clement. 1970
- Vanishing wildlife, edited by Roger Caras. Foreword by Roger Tory Peterson. 1970
- Animal architecture. Edited by Roger Caras. Foreword by Roger Tory Peterson. 1971
- Birds in flight. Edited by Roger Caras. Foreword by Roger Tory Peterson. 1971
- Death as a way of life [by] Roger A. Caras. 1971
- Animal courtships. Edited by Roger Caras. Foreword by Roger Tory Peterson. 1972
- Boundary: land and sea. Edited by Roger Caras. Foreword by Roger Tory Peterson. 1972
- Creatures of the night. Edited by Roger Caras. Foreword by Roger Tory Peterson. 1972
- Last chance on earth; a requiem for wildlife, by Roger A. Caras. Illustrated by Charles Fracé. New pref. by the author. 1972
- Protective coloration and mimicry; nature's camouflage. Edited by Roger Caras. Foreword by Roger Tory Peterson. 1972
- Going to the zoo with Roger Caras, by Roger Caras. Illustrated by Cyrille R. Gentry. Foreword by William G. Conway. 1973
- Wonderful world of mammals; adventuring with stamps, by Roger Caras. 1973
- Bizarre animals / by Roger Caras; foreword by Roger Tory Peterson. 1974
- North American mammals: fur-bearing animals of the United States and Canada / by Roger A. Caras. 1974
- Private lives of animals. Commentary by Roger Caras. Design and coordination by Massimo Vignelli and Gudrun Buettner. Assembled and edited by Milton Rugoff and Ann Guilfoyle. 1974
- Venomous animals / by Roger Caras; foreword by Roger Tory Peterson. 1974
- Venomous animals of the world [by] Roger Caras. 1974
- Dangerous to man: the definitive story of wildlife's reputed dangers / Roger A. Caras. 1975
- Sockeye: the life of a Pacific salmon / by Roger Caras. 1975
- Zoo in your room / Roger Caras; ill. by Pamela Johnson. 1975
- Roger Caras pet book / Roger A. Caras. 1976
- Skunk for a day / Roger Caras; pictures by Diane Paterson. 1976
- Pet medicine: health care and first aid for all household pets / by Roger Caras ... [et al.]; with ill. by Suzanne Clee; designed by Barbara Bell Pitnof. 1977
- Coyote for a day / Roger Caras; illustrated by Diane Paterson. 1977
- Monarch of Deadman Bay: the life and death of a Kodiak bear / by Roger Caras; ill. by Charles Fracé. 1977
- Panther! / by Roger Caras; ill. by Charles Fracé. 1977
- Source of the thunder: the biography of a California condor / by Roger Caras; ill. by Charles Fracé; foreword by Roland C. Clement. 1977
- Dog owner's Bible / editor, Roger A. Caras; special assistant editor, Donald L. Wall ... [et al.]. 1978
- Custer Wolf: biography of an American renegade / by Roger A. Caras; introd. by Gerald Durrell; illustrated by Charles Fracé. 1979
- Dogs: records, stars, feats, and facts / Roger Caras and Pamela C. Graham. 1979
- Forest / Roger Caras; ill. by Norman Arlott. 1979
- Mysteries of nature, explained and unexplained / by Roger Caras. 1979
- Yankee: the inside story of a champion bloodhound / Roger A. Caras. 1979
- Amiable little beasts: investigating the lives of young animals / conceived and edited by Ann Guilfoyle; text by Roger A. Caras and Steve Graham. 1980
- Forest / Roger Caras; ill. by Norman Arlott. 1980
- Roger Caras dog book / photos. by Alton Anderson. 1980
- Celebration of dogs / Roger Caras. 1982
- Celebration of dogs / Roger Caras. 1984
- Harper's illustrated handbook of cats / health care section by Robert W. Kirk; edited by Roger Caras; with photographs by Richard J. Katris and Nancy Katris. 1985
- Harper's illustrated handbook of dogs / health care section by Robert W. Kirk; edited by Roger Caras; with photographs by John L. Ashby. 1985
- Endless migrations / Roger Caras; illustrations by Kimio Honda. 1985
- Mara Simba: the African lion / Roger Caras. 1985
- Celebration of cats / Roger A. Caras. 1986
- Roger Caras' treasury of great cat stories. 1987
- Roger Caras' treasury of great dog stories. 1987
- Animals in their places: tales from the natural world / Roger A. Caras. 1987
- Private lives of animals / commentary by Roger Caras. 1987
- Cat is watching: a look at the way cats see us / Roger A. Caras. 1989
- Animal families of the wild: animal stories / by Roger Caras ... [et al.]; edited by William F. Russell; with art by John Butler. 1990
- Roger Caras' treasury of great horse stories. 1990
- Custer wolf: biography of an American renegade / by Roger A. Caras; illustrated by Charles Fracé. 1990
- Monarch of Deadman Bay: the life and death of a Kodiak bear / by Roger A. Caras; illustrations by Charles Fracé. 1990
- Panther! / by Roger A. Caras; illustrations by Charles Fracé. 1990
- Forest / Roger Caras; illustrations by Norman Arlott. 1991
- Sarang: the story of a Bengal tiger and of two children in search of a miracle: a novel / by Roger A. Caras. 1991
- Source of the thunder: the biography of a California condor / by Roger A. Caras; illustrations by Charles Fracé; foreword by Roland C. Clement. 1991
- Cats at work / Rhonda Gray and Stephen T. Robinson; commentary by Roger Caras; commissioned photography by Guy Powers. 1991
- Custer wolf [sound recording] / by Roger A. Caras. 1992
- Dog is listening: the way some of our closest friends view us / Roger A. Caras. 1992
- Roger Caras dog book / Roger Caras; photographs by Alton Anderson. 1992
- Roger Caras' treasury of classic nature tales. 1992
- Cats of Thistle Hill: a mostly peaceable kingdom / Roger A. Caras; photographs by Dave and Jennifer McMichael, additional photographs by Mimi Vang Olsen; back cover portrait of Roger Caras by Ian Hornak. 1994
- World full of animals: the Roger Caras story / by Roger Caras. 1994
- Field guide to venomous animals and poisonous plants, North America, north of Mexico / Steven Foster and Roger A. Caras. 1994
- Most dangerous journey: the life of an African elephant / Roger A. Caras, with photographs by the author. 1995
- Perfect harmony: the intertwining lives of animals and humans throughout history / Roger A. Caras. 1996 *Roger Caras dog book / Roger Caras; principal photography by Alton Anderson. 1996
- New Roger Caras treasury of great cat stories. 1997
- Bond: people and their animals / essays by Roger Caras; photographs by Shel Secunda. 1997
- Cat is watching: a look at the way cats see us / Roger A. Cars. 1997
- Dog is listening: the way some of our closest friends view us / Roger A. Caras. 1998
- New Roger Caras treasury of great dog stories. 1999
- New Roger Caras treasury of great horse stories. 1999
- Roger Caras' treasury of great fishing stories. 1999
- Going for the blue: inside the world of show dogs and dog shows / by Roger A. Caras. 2001

== See also ==
- Dogs in the United States
