= Sue Coleman =

English Wildlife painter

- Born: Susan J Knott; 1947 (age 78–79); Colchester, Essex England
- Education: Colchester County High with a distinction from Cambridge University for her art.
- Known for: Painting, watercolour, landscape Wildlife
- Awards: Silver Teal Award (1994)
- Website: Sue Coleman

Sue Coleman (born March 1947) is a wildlife painter from England who moved to Vancouver Island, in Canada in 1967. Coleman is known for her watercolour paintings in which she uses a controversial style adapting the styles and motifs of Indigenous art. She also paints west-coast scenes, wildlife, and landscapes. Coleman has written and illustrated seven books.

== Career ==
In 1967, Coleman moved from England to Canada and began to study the art of First Nations artists in the 1980s. She has called what she does as a "translation" of Indigenous Canadian art. She then began to make art that combines the style and motifs of Northwest Coast Indigenous art with her own representational style because as she has said, "I wanted to help non native people, understand the art form." She does not feel that she is actually copying or reproducing any Indigenous artists' specific works, but rather she has stated that her work "adapts and blends a number of Indigenous styles from B.C. to create her own original style."

=== Controversy ===
Coleman's style is often referred to as a cultural appropriation of Indigenous art work. Some people were confused, and mistakenly believed that her paintings were done by an Indigenous artist. Although Coleman considered this a compliment to her skill as an artist, she always claimed to be an English emigrant. Her work has been referred to by both Indigenous and non-Indigenous artists as cultural appropriations or knockoffs of Indigenous artwork, according to reports by the CBC.

Coleman once described herself as a "translator" of Indigenous art forms which drew criticism. The Kwakwak'awakw/Salish artist Carey Newman has stated, "We do not need you or anyone else to 'translate' our art form." Newman's father also discouraged her from using Indigenous traditional imagery in her work, and according to the CBC, "He told her the practice of non-Indigenous people copying and selling Indigenous-style artwork was immoral." Prominent Indigenous artists Richard Hunt, George Littlechild, Roy Henry Vickers among over 100 others, signed an open letter critical of Coleman's appropriation of Indigenous art. Over the years Coleman's art style has changed. During a 2017 interview with the Canadian Broadcasting Corporation, Coleman said she is beginning to do art in a completely different style.

=== Awards ===
"Silver Teal Award" (1994). Presented by Ducks Unlimited in British Columbia

== Books ==
- An Artist’s Vision (1989) By Sue Coleman
- Artist at Large in the Queen Charlotte Islands (1992) By Sue Coleman
- Artist at Large along the South Coast of Alaska (1993) By Sue Coleman
- "Biggle Foo meets Stinky" (1997) By Sue Coleman
- Biggle Foo Becomes a Legend (1997) By Sue Coleman
- Return of the Raven (2013) By Sue Coleman
- The Trumpeter Swan (2015) By Sue Coleman

== Personal ==
Coleman is from Colchester, Essex England. In 1967, she married Canadian Dan Coleman (whom she met in high school while Dan lived with his mother in Colchester), and she lives in Cowichan Bay. Coleman was trained as a pastry chef but began painting in the 1980s. Coleman works to promote environmental conservation.

== See also ==
- Cultural Appropriation
- Indigenous intellectual property
- Visual arts by Indigenous peoples of North America
