= Wilhelm Kuhnert =

German painter

- Born: September 28, 1865; Oppeln, Prussia
- Died: February 11, 1926 (aged 60); Flims, Switzerland
- Occupation: Painter

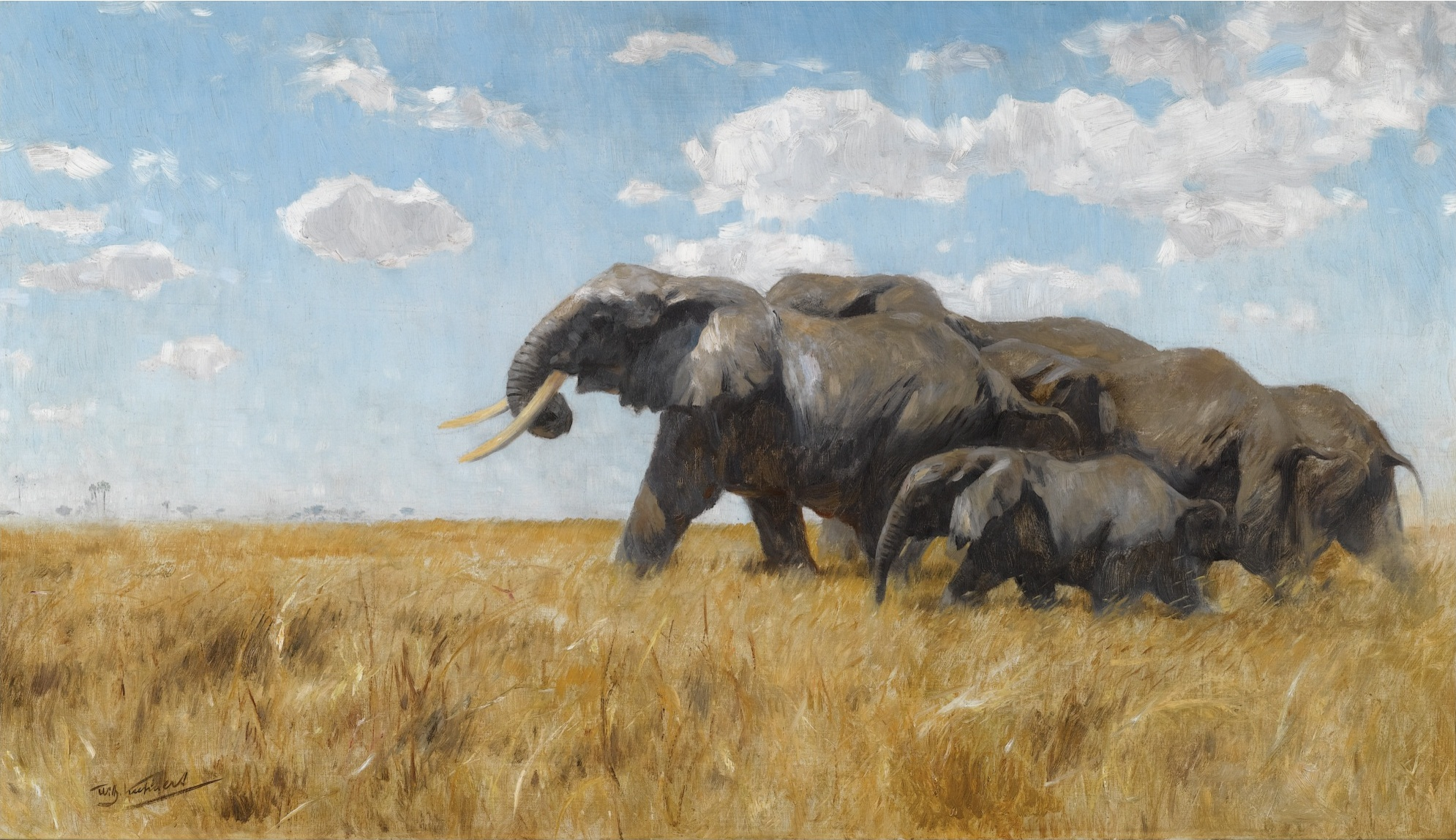
Migrating Elephants

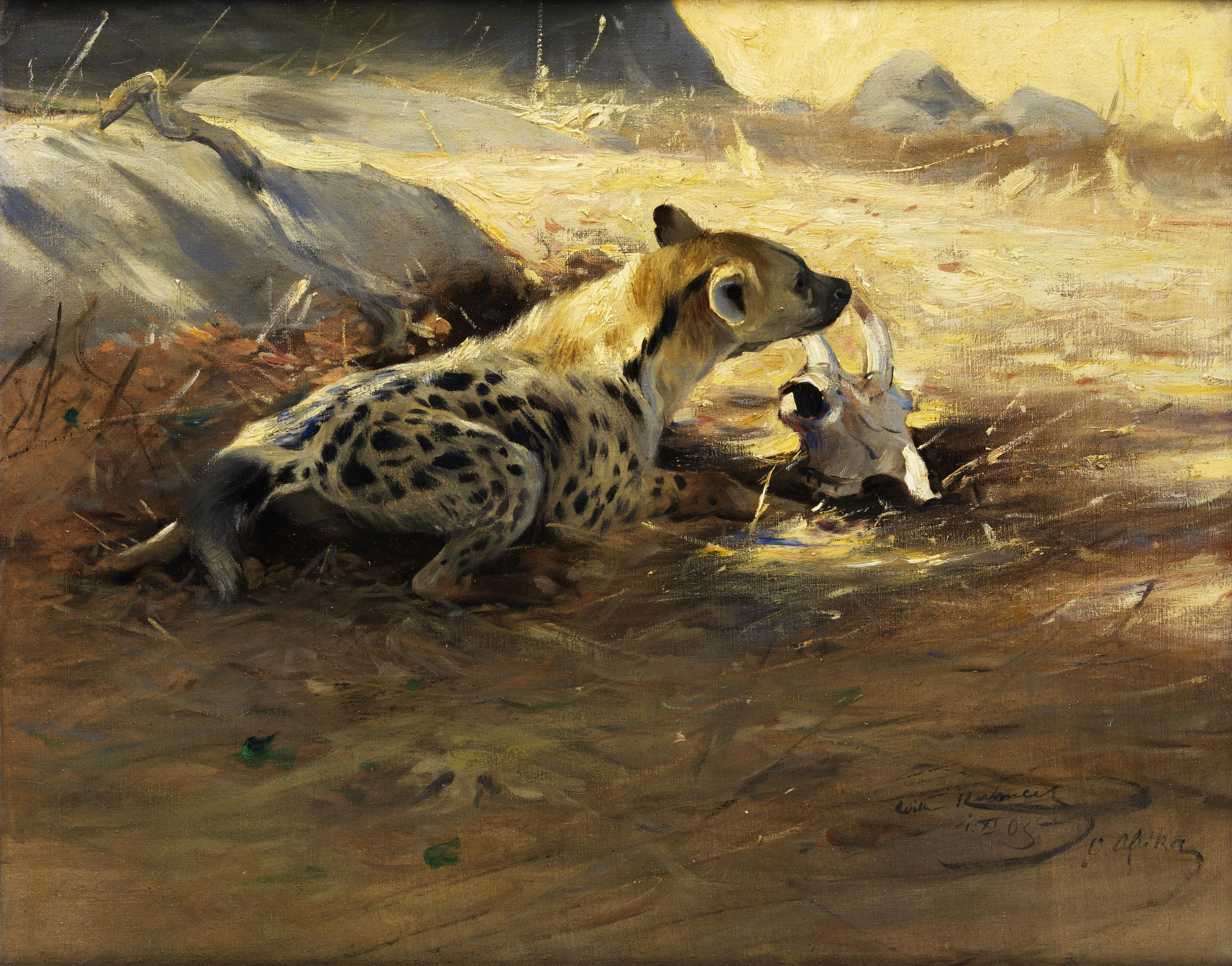
Hyena (1905)

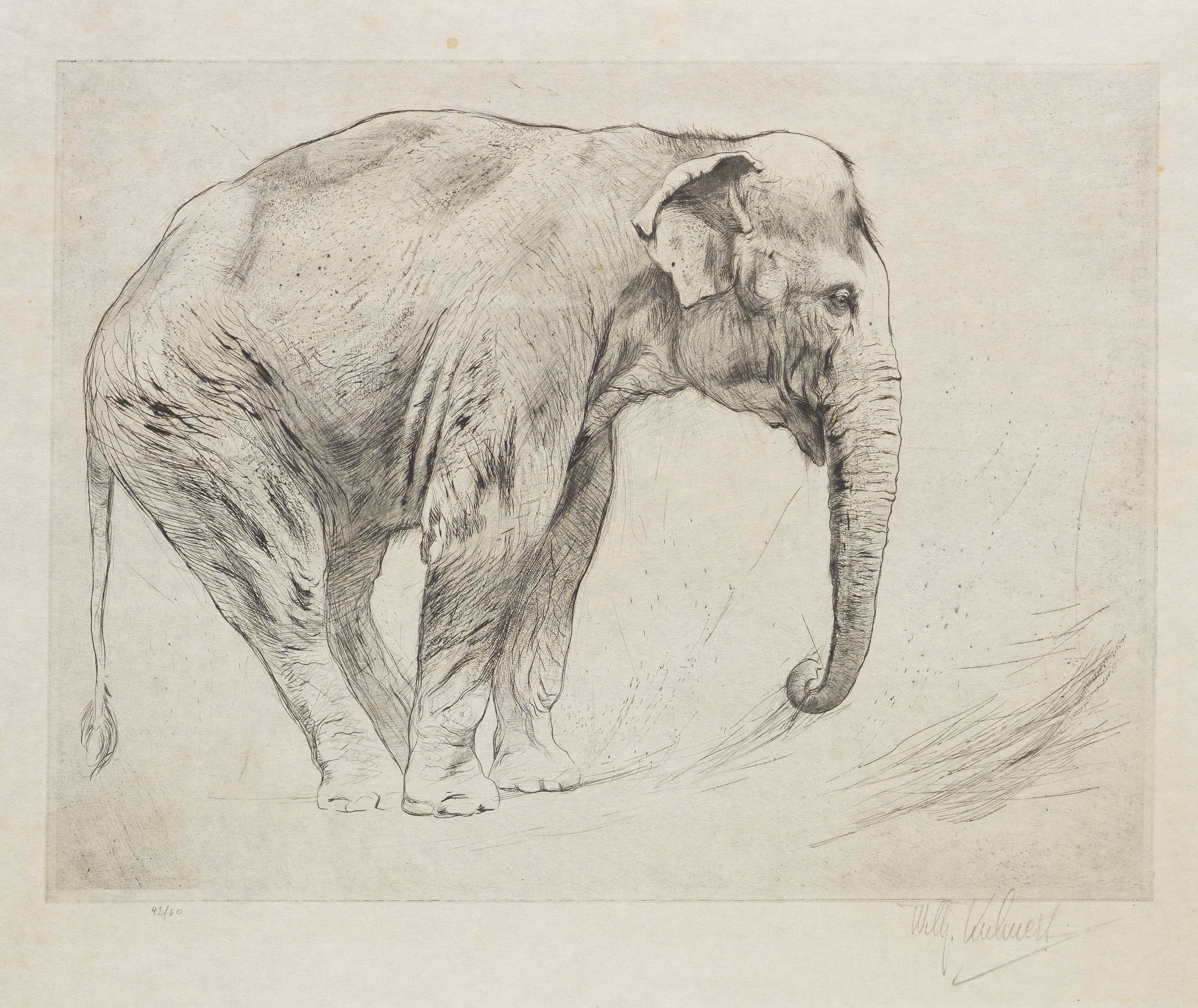
Indian elephant, etching

Friedrich Wilhelm Karl Kuhnert (September 28, 1865 – February 11, 1926) was a German painter, author and illustrator, who specialized in animal images. After illustrating the books of Alfred Brehm, he travelled to German East Africa to observe animals in their habitat. He produced numerous paintings that defined Africa for many Germans of the period.

== Life and work ==
Kuhnert was born in Oppeln in 1865. After the end of his technical-commercial apprenticeship at the age of 17, Kuhnert was a scholarship student at the Berlin University of the Arts from 1883 to 1887. From his home in Berlin, he embarked on travels to Scandinavia, Egypt, East Africa and India to make landscape and animal studies. His favorite motif was the African lion. In 1901 Kuhnert was the illustrator for zoologist Johann Wilhelm Haacke's book Animal Life on Earth. In 1903, he became one of the many artists selected to provide illustrations and design trading cards for the Cologne chocolate company, Stollwerck. He also provided some illustrations for the 1890 edition of Brehms Tierleben.

Contrary to the practice of his peers, Kuhnert distinguished himself by sketching tropical animals in the wild, not in zoos. He made pictures by sketching, etching, watercolor, and oil painting. Kuhnert is considered one of the most important German animal painters of his time. Kuhnert was a keen and skilled hunter himself; he returned to Africa year after year in the hunt for both game and subjects for his art.

== Death ==
Kuhnert died on February 11, 1926, during a recovery stay in Flims, Switzerland. His grave is in the Stahnsdorf South-Western Cemetery in Berlin.

== Personal life ==
In 1894, he married 18-year-old Emilie Caroline Wilhelmine Ottilie Alvine Herdikerhoff. They had a daughter, Emilie. The couple divorced in 1909 while Emilie was a student in Ceylon. Kuhnert married for the second time to Gerda von Jankowski in 1913. In 1925, on his 60th birthday, she died.

== Books by Kuhnert ==
- Animal Portraiture (Text by Richard Lydekker). Frederick Warne & Co. London 1912
- Im Lande meiner Modelle (In the Land of My Models). Leipzig 1918. Reissued by HardPress (2013) ISBN 1-3149-4590-4
- Meine Tiere: die Radierungen Wilhelm Kuhnerts (My Animals: The Etchings of Wilhelm Kuhnert). Berlin 1925

=== Further works (selection) ===
- Six colored photoplates for Deutsch-Ostafrika im Aufstand 1905/06 (Berlin 1909) by Gustav Adolf Graf von Götzen

== Books about Kuhnert ==
- Angelika Grettmann-Werner: Wilhelm Kuhnert (1865-1926). Tierdarstellung zwischen Wissenschaft und Kunst. Hamburg 1981 ISBN 3-922732-09-7
- Hansjörg Werner: Wer war Wilhelm Kuhnert. Der grosse deutsche Tiermaler. ISBN 3-939119-09-1
- Vollständiger Katalog der Originalradierungen des Künstlers (Full Catalog of Original Etchings by the Artist). Berlin 1927
