= Mark Upton =

English painter (born 1964)

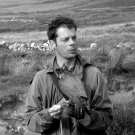
- Born: 1964 (age 61–62); Marlborough
- Patrons: HM Queen Elizabeth The Queen Mother, Sheikh Zayed bin Sultan Al Nahayan

Mark Upton (born 1964) is an English artist who specialises in portraits of animals, particularly horses and falcons. His main media are oil paint, watercolour and pencil.

== Early life ==
Mark Lundy Upton was born in Wiltshire, England in 1964. His parents, Roger and Jean (née Turnell) were living in Marlborough and had recently started a leather and sporting goods retail business in the town. Roger was already a well known falconer and the same year as Mark was born had started to travel in the Middle East, going to Abu Dhabi as a guest of the late Sheikh Said bin Shakhbut. There he met and became a lifelong friend of Sheikh Zayed bin Sultan Al Nahyan who later became ruler of Abu Dhabi and the first president of the UAE. Jean was the eldest daughter of Bob Turnell who was at the time one of the leading jumping racehorse trainers of the time with a yard just outside Marlborough at Ogbourne Maizey. Mark's brother, Guy Upton is eighteen months younger, and is a steeplechase jockey and horseman.

He went to the local primary school at Preshute and later attended St Johns in Marlborough. After school, Mark took a year out and worked for Sheikh Surour bin Mohamad al Nahayan in Abu Dhabi. He then returned and spent a year at Swindon College of Art on an art foundation course. Upton had been brought up in a very artistic background. His father painted wildlife pictures, his uncle, Peter Upton was a well known equine artist and his grandmother had been an artist and fashion designer. Her brother was William Cain, a renowned dry point engraver between the wars spending much of his career in the Middle East.

Upton is also very well known in the falconry world as one of the top artists as well as an extremely dedicated and good falconer. In this he has followed his father and become much admired for his high-flying falcons in his own right.

In 2008, Upton married Rachelle Ormond, niece of art historian Richard Louis Ormond and great-niece of artist John Singer Sargent.

== Commissions and patrons ==
Instead of going on to do a Fine Art Degree at Art School Mark went straight into a painting career. Soon forging a name for himself in the country and sporting art world. At the same time he was frequently travelling in the Middle East, and was receiving commissions for many paintings of that part of the world. He has sold paintings to the late Sheikh Zayed bin Sultan of Abu Dhabi and many of his family. In Saudi his main patron is Prince Saud bin Abdul Mohsin al Saud and he also has paintings in collections of other Saudi Princes. Princess Alia of Jordan has also bought Mark Upton paintings.

In the UK Mark's most important patron was HM Queen Elizabeth The Queen Mother who bought various paintings from him including Scottish landscapes and sporting paintings. He has also painted for bodies like the Injured Jockeys Fund, Countryside Alliance, the Game Conservancy and Spinal Injuries Association.

== Publications ==
Mark has illustrated several books:

- Hood, Leash & Lure: Falconry in the 20th Century (ISBN 0954810406) by Roger Upton
- Arab Falconry: History of a Way of Life (ISBN 0888394926) by Roger Upton
- The Baz-Nama-Yi Nasiri (A Persian Treatise On Falconry) / Observations On Eastern Falconry/One Thousand Years Of Falconry (ASIN: B001AW3VCQ) by Kenyon Gibson and Lieut.-Colonel D.C. Phillott
- Hemp for Victory (ISBN 095499390X) by Kenyon Gibson.
