= Glanmore National Historic Site =

Historic house in Belleville, Ontario, Canada

Coordinates: 44°10′01″N 77°22′03″W

- Glanmore House
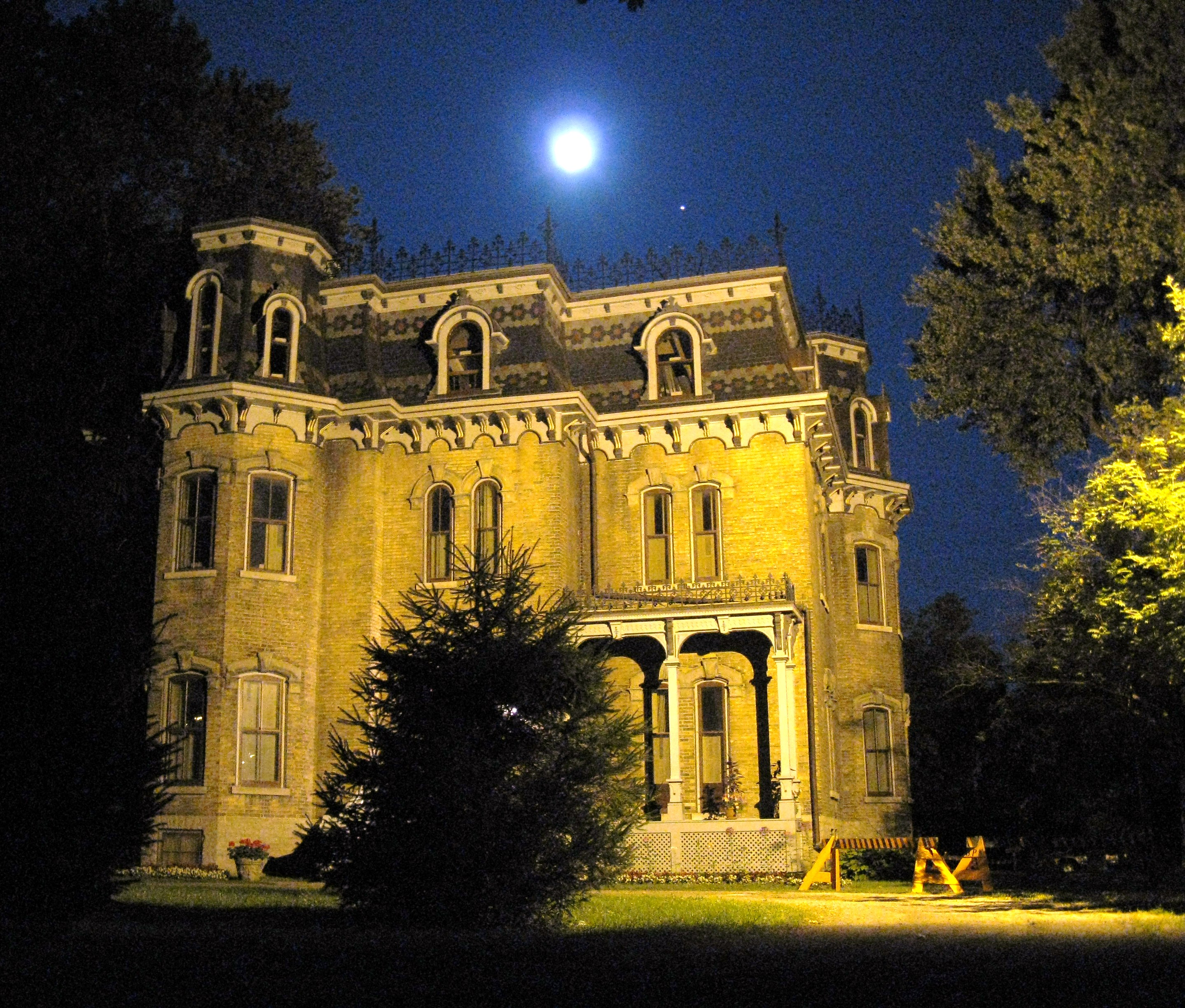

- Location in southern Ontario
- Location: 257 Bridge Street East; Belleville, Ontario, Canada

History
- Built: 1882–1883
- Built for: John Philpot Curran Phillips, Harriet Dougall Phillips

Site notes
- Architect: Thomas Hanley
- Architectural style: Second Empire
- Governing body: Parks Canada
- Owner: City of Belleville
- Website: http://glanmore.ca/

National Historic Site of Canada
- Designated: 1969

Glanmore National Historic Site (Glanmore House), located in Belleville, Ontario, Canada, is a former residence and current National Historic Site. It was constructed in 1882-1883 for J.P.C. Phillips and his wife Harriet Dougall Phillips.

== Architectural Structure ==
Glanmore National Historic Site is built on land that Harriet Dougall Phillips inherited from the Bleecker family. She and her husband, wealthy banker John Philpot Curran Phillips, constructed the house in 1882-1883 in the Second Empire architectural style. The building exterior features a slate mansard roof, cornices, and elaborate molding. It was designed by architect Thomas Hanley of Belleville and built by Francis McKay.

The building underwent restoration of the roof in 1997, and the conservation of the historic plaster interiors in 2012. The ceilings are believed to have been originally hand-painted by Harriet Dougall Phillips, the original inhabitant of the house. By 2018, the house had been through 22 restoration projects designed to conserve its original state.

The name Glanmore House is suggested to have come from potential ties between the original owners and the Glanmore region of Ireland.

== National Historic Site Status ==
Glanmore was designated as a National Historic Site in 1969, due to its architectural style, and has operated as a museum since 1973. Much of the building is restored to showcase 1890s interiors, as well as period landscaping of the exterior.

The National Historic Site is home to the Phillips-Burrows-Faulkner Collection, which consists of material original to the house as owned by the four generations of the Phillips family who lived in the house from its construction up until 1971. Much of this collection is on display in the house.

== Public Programming ==
Glanmore National Historic Site offers public programs and exhibitions, including the exhibition “Nice Women Don’t Want The Vote,” in 2017, to commemorate the 100th anniversary of women receiving the right to vote in Manitoba. The exhibition "Hands on Nature" from the Royal Ontario Museum was displayed in March 2018. The exhibition "Unmasking Influenza," about the Spanish flu, was shown in August 2019.

== Haunting ==
Glanmore House is believed to be haunted by the ghost of Harriet Dougall Phillips. An exorcism in the early 1960s by a local priest is reported to have led to a decrease in hauntings.
