= Charles Church (artist) =

British painter (born 1970)

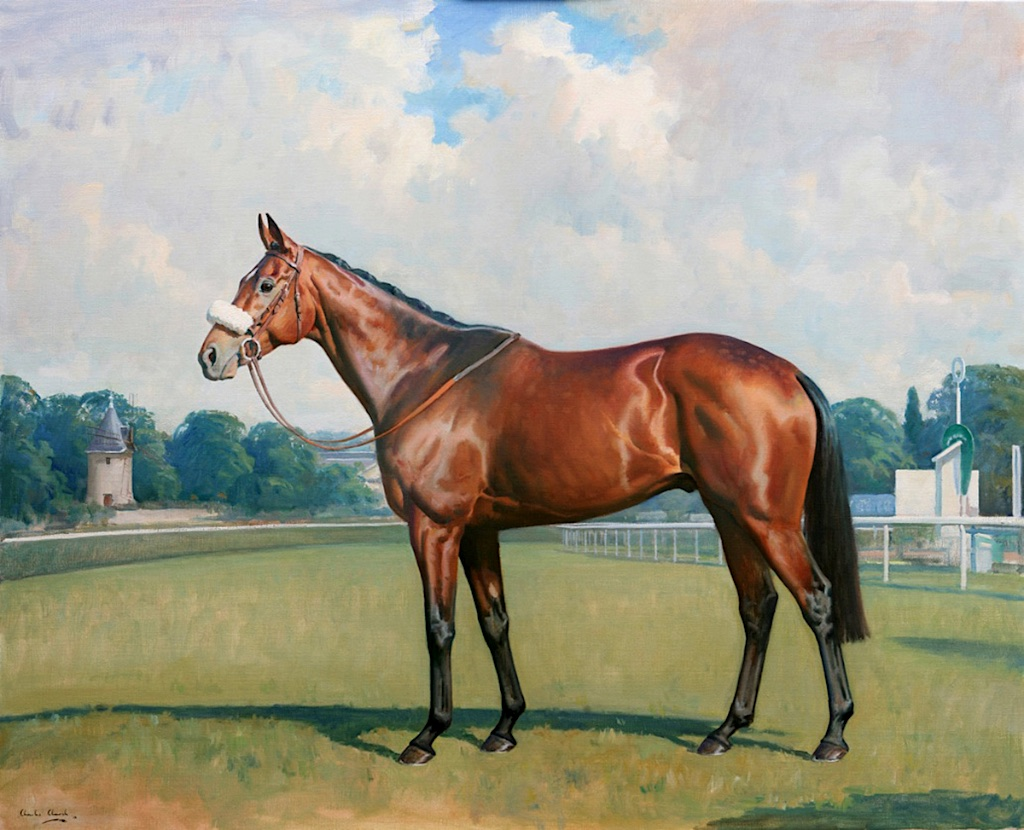
- Dunaden: 2011 Melbourne Cup winner, painted by Charles Church
- Born: 17 December 1970 (age 55); Northumberland
- Known for: Equestrian art
- Website: charleschurch.net

Charles Church (born 17 December 1970) is a British painter best known for his equestrian portraits.

== Biography ==
Born in Northumberland, Church trained at Newcastle College and the Charles H. Cecil Studios in Florence where he learned to paint using the sight-size portrait tradition.

Because most of his work is painted to commission, it is rarely seen on public display. His one-man exhibitions at galleries in Mayfair in 2017 and 2022 were both sell outs.

His commissions include many of horse racing's Grade 1 winners including Arc de Triomphe winners Enable, Found, Hurricane Run, Dylan Thomas and Zarkava, World Champion Goldikova, US Champion Flightline, Australian Champion Sire Fastnet Rock, 2011 Melbourne Cup Winner Dunaden, Grand National Winner Mr Frisk, Cheltenham Gold Cup Winners Synchronised and Master Oats, and Epsom Derby winners Desert Crown, Masar, Golden Horn, Pour Moi and Authorized.

In the foreword to the exhibition catalogue for "Great British", the King described Charles as a remarkable artist, possessing "a unique sensitivity and profound understanding of his subject matter."

In 2023 HM The Queen unveiled Charles' monumental portrait of John Holliday, Huntsman of the Belvoir in the British Sporting Art Trust collection at Palace House, Newmarket.

Writing in the catalogue of his 2013 show "Further Afield", Sotheby's chairman Henry Wyndham says: "In my opinion, Church's work carries many of the hallmarks of some of the most renowned British painters of the early 20th century."

Church lives and works in Dorset.
