= Charles Hancock (painter) =

British painter

Charles Hancock (around 1800 – 30 July 1877) was a British painter of animals, specialising in equestrian sporting scenes. One of his largest and most recognisable works is the double portrait of two thoroughbreds in a wide landscape, showing Sir Hercules and Thorngrove.

== Early life ==
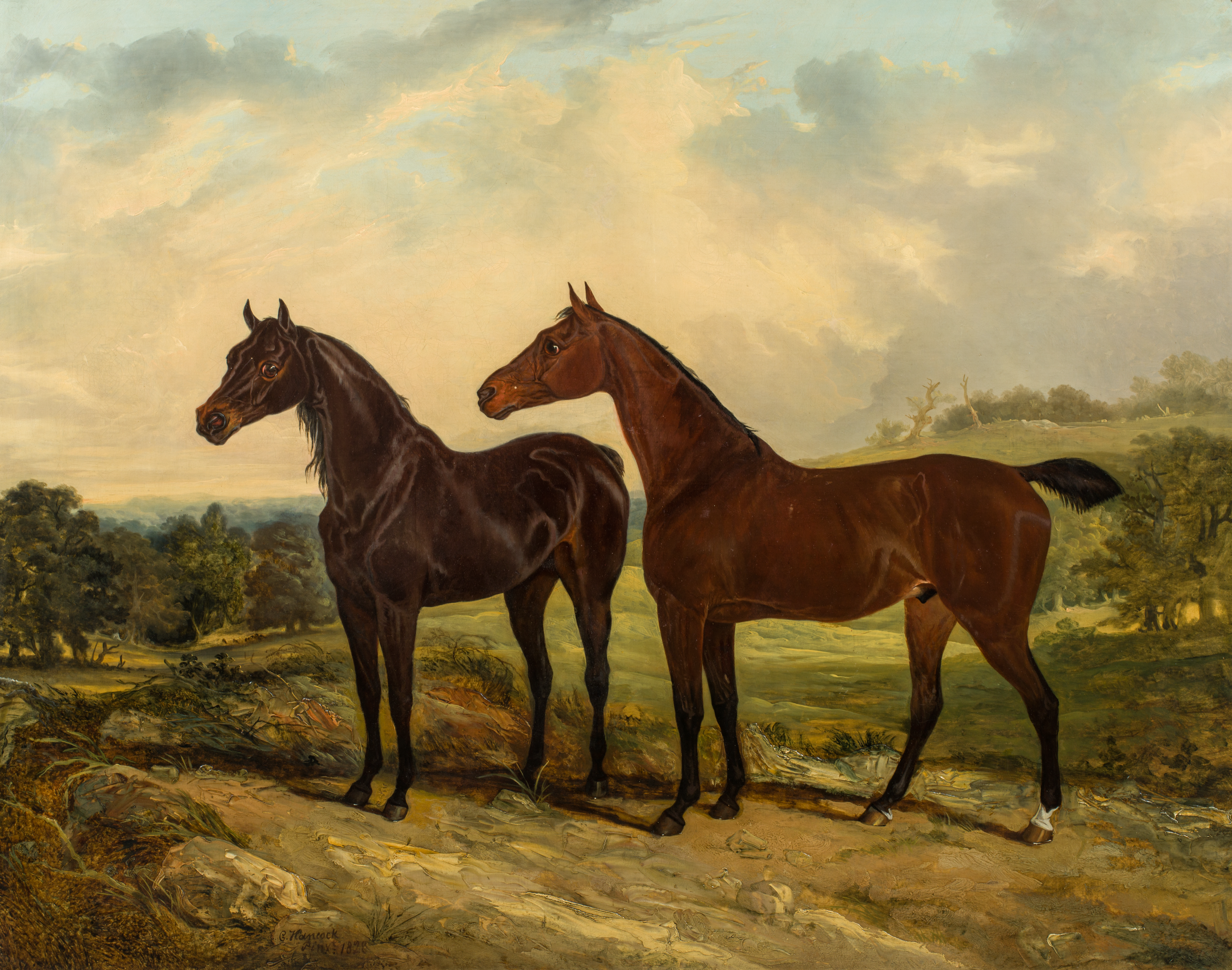
Sir Hercules (left) and Thorngrove (right), by Charles Hancock. Signed and dated C. Hancock. Pinx 1828.

Charles Hancock was the eight son of James Hancock, a cabinetmaker from Marlborough. Little is known about his early life. In 1819 the Royal Academy of Arts accepted a picture of him for exhibition and shows that at that time Hancock was residing at 55, St. James's Street in London. The picture was a portrait of his father. In about 1820 he moved to Norwich where he studied unter James Stark.

=== The smell of the stable is already within reach ===
There is no mentioning of Charles Hancock in the catalogue of the Royal Academy of Arts in the following year. But at the exhibition of 1821 he was represented by The Broken Teapot, a title which suggests that he only later in his life turned his attention to the sporting field. At this time he was residing in Marlborough. Until the year 1830 he lived in different places. He dwelled between Marlborough, Reading, High Wycombe and London. His London address being given as Messers. Tattersall's, Grosvenor Place.

It is therefore not surprising that Charles Hancock also worked for the family Tattersall. Among other works, Hancock painted a portrait of Richard Tattersall (1785–1859), known as "Old Dick", the grandson of Richard Tattersall.

== Later years ==
Living nine or ten years in country localities where sport, especially equestrian sports, was part of the daily life of the landed gentry, it was only natural that Charles Hancock should have developed a taste for this sporting life, which has left evidence in numerous paintings. Between the years 1819 and 1847 he exhibited at the Royal Academy of Arts twenty-three works which shows his proclivities for this genre. He became well known for his paintings of animals and horses in particular. He became so popular that for a number of years he was commissioned to paint Derby winners which forms an important part of his work.

=== A sporting life ===
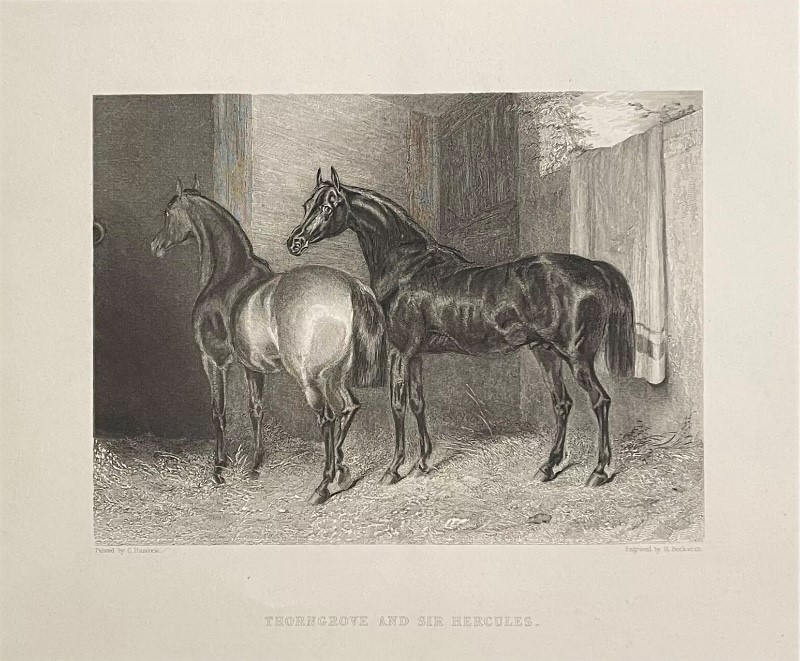
Thorngrove (left) and Sir Hercules (right) in their stable, painted by Charles Hancock and engraved in 1838 by Henry S. Beckwith.

Charles Hancock did not confine his exhibits to the Royal Academy of Arts. He also showed fifty-five paintings at the British Institution and forty-seven at the Suffolk Street exhibitions. He also contributed occasionally to other selected London galleries. However, it was not until 1825 that he turned his attention to animal subjects and sporting scenes. The first of such to call for notice was his portrait of the celebrated racehorse Sir Hercules. This horse, bred in Ireland in 1826, was sold in 1833 to go to the United States of America.

=== Famous racehorse painter of his time ===
At one period of his career, it would seem that Charles Hancock was the fashionable painter of racehorses between the years 1835 and 1843. It was at that time when Hancock's paintings of horses came to the attention of the proprietor of The Sporting Magazine and, more importantly, to Rudolph Ackermann in Regent Street. Hancock succeeded John Ferneley in supplying paintings of Derby and St Leger winners to Ackermann who was publishing prints of these classic racehorses in competition with S. & J. Fuller at the time.

For the last 30 years of Charles Hancock's life he suffered from heart attacks. He died on 30 July 1877 at Blackheath.
