= Kim Donaldson (artist) =

Zimbabwean artist

Kim Donaldson (born 1952 in Southern Rhodesia), is a Zimbabwean artist who specializes in painting portraits and the wildlife of Africa. Having spent his early life on a 150,000-acre (610 km^{2}) ranch in what was Rhodesia, Donaldson was perfectly placed to develop and nurture his interest in the wildlife and people that surrounded him.

== Career ==
Donaldson's paintings document the political and environmental issues facing the continent and his painting style incorporates several techniques including realism and impressionism.

His work in pastel is the most recognized of his oeuvres; however, recent works in oil and mixed media have also seen great success amongst collectors worldwide. His use of a wide palette and texture gives a sense that the works were painted using the red soil of Africa.

Donaldson has been featured in four books, participated in numerous one man shows and group exhibitions throughout Europe and the Americas, and sold his works in several auction houses.

Donaldson's passion for the wildlife of Africa led him to write a book "Africa, An Artist's Journal" detailing his travels and experiences that give him the reference for his beautiful paintings. Donaldson's book took him over 4½ years to complete. He designed, wrote and illustrated the book himself; it became a best-seller in five countries and was highly commended by Victoria & Albert Museum book award for design.

== Artwork ==
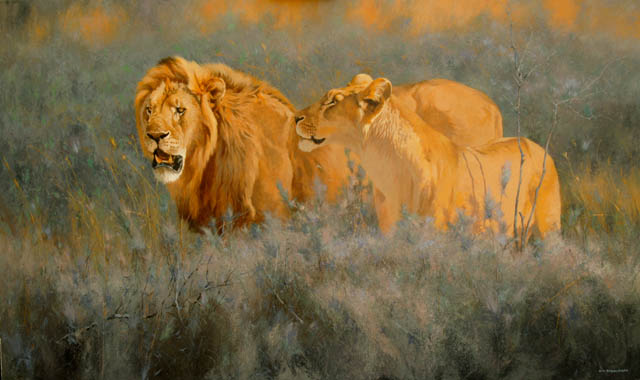

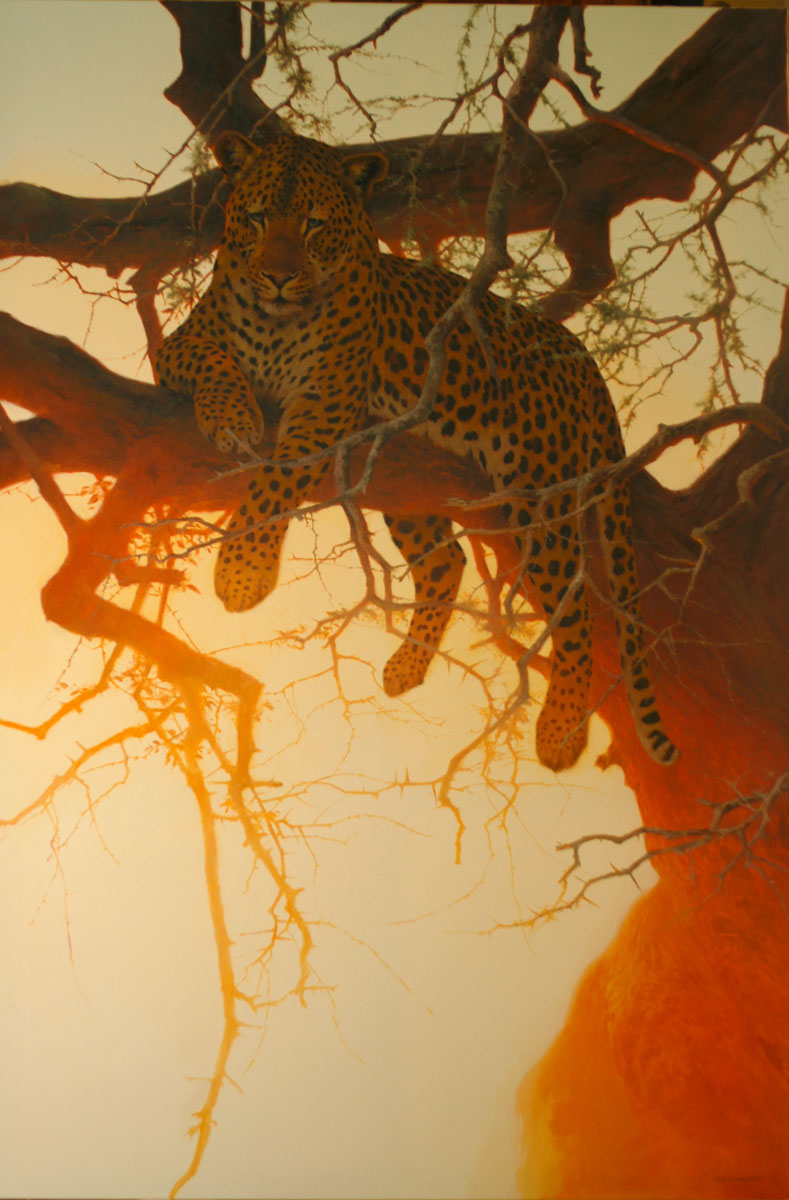

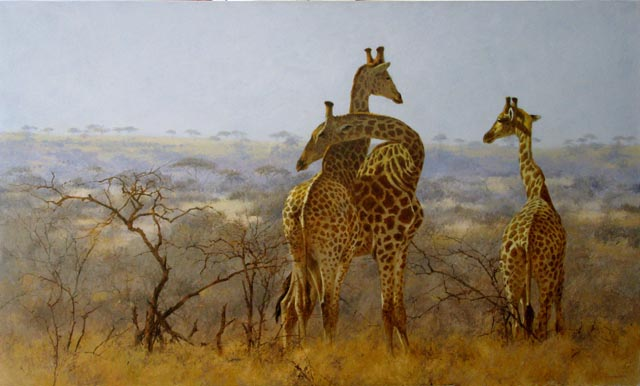
