= Dr. Williams' Pink Pills for Pale People =

Patent medicine produced from 1890 to 1970s

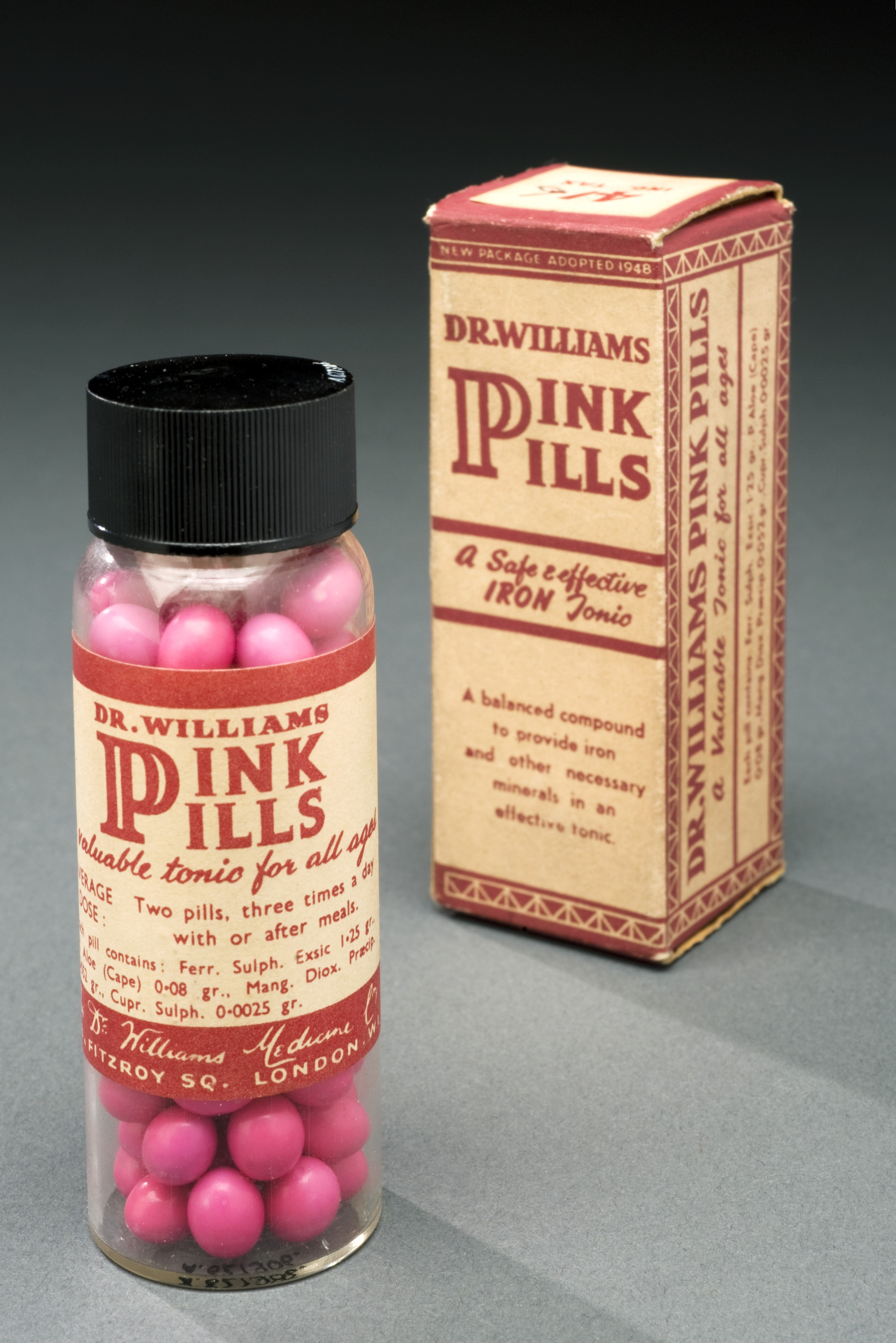
Dr Williams' Pink Pills

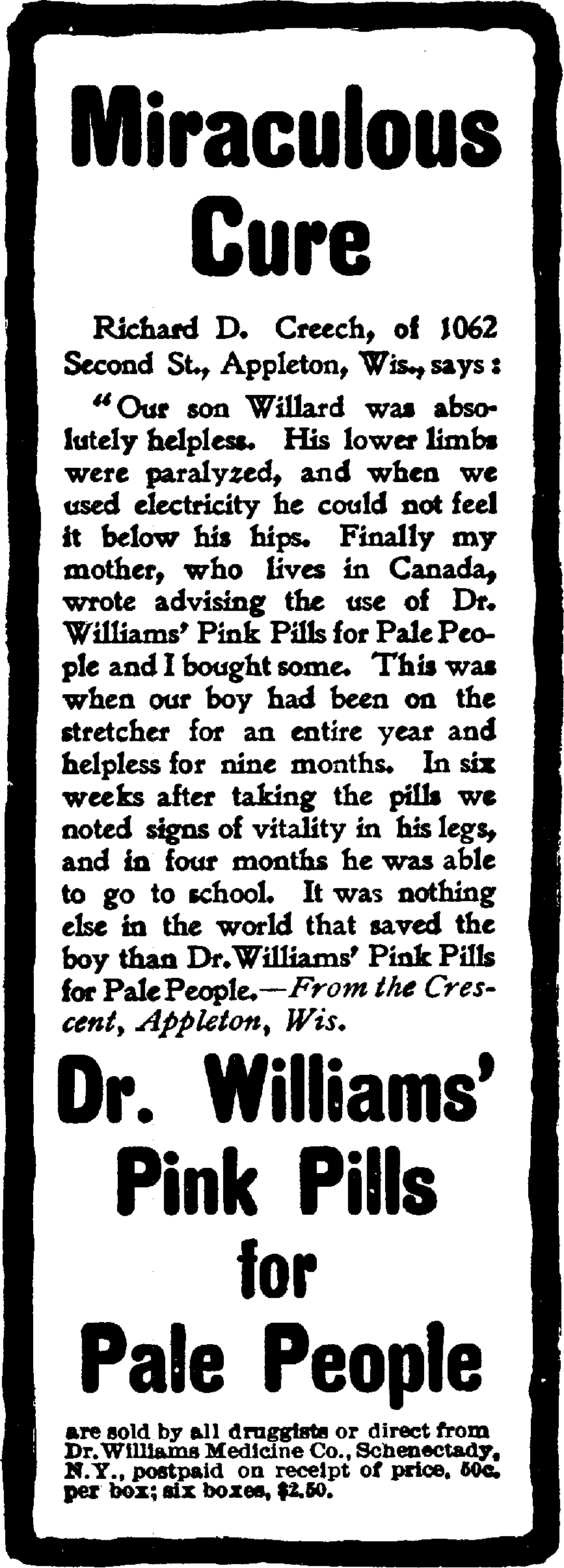
Advertisement for Dr. Williams' Pink Pills for Pale People.

Dr. Williams' Pink Pills for Pale People was a late 19th to early 20th-century patent medicine containing mostly ferrous sulfate. It was produced by Dr. Williams Medicine Company, the trading arm of G. T. Fulford & Company. It was claimed to cure chorea, referenced frequently in newspaper headlines as "St. Vitus' Dance"; as well as "locomotor ataxia, partial paralyxia, seistica, neuralgia rheumatism, nervous headache, the after-effects of la grippe, palpitation of the heart, pale and sallow complexions, [and] all forms of weakness in male or female."

The pills were available over-the-counter.

== History ==
In 1890, G. T. Fulford & Company purchased the rights to produce Dr. Williams' Pink Pills for Pale People for $100 (equivalent to $3,794 in 2025) after encountering a pill prescribed by a local physician, William Jackson, and began marketing it through Dr. Williams Medicine Company. Reverend Enoch Hill of M.E. Church of Grand Junction in Iowa, endorsed the product in many 1900s advertisements, claiming that it energized him and cured his chronic headaches. Eventually, the product came to be advertised around the world in 82 countries, including its native Canada, the United States, and Europe. In the late 19th century, the pills were marketed in the UK by the American businessman John Morgan Richards.

The Pink Pills were widely used across the British Empire and, as the historian of Southeast Asia Mary Kilcline Cody puts it, "If the invulnerability magic of the sola topi, the spine pad and the cholera belt failed, Europeans could always rely on the Pink Pills to alleviate the pressures of bearing the white man's burden." The Pink Pills were not only marketed in Europe; tales of its "wonder" spread even to Egypt.

In 1890, a successful Canadian businessman with journalism experience by the name of John MacKenzie helped to publicize the product. In 1892, he was made manager of the medicine company, and held that position until his retirement in 1929. When George Taylor Fulford, Sr., the Canadian senator that founded G. T. Fulford & Company, died in 1905 in an automobile accident, George Taylor Fulford II became involved in the family business.

Today, the home of George Taylor Fulford, Sr. in Brockville, Ontario, Fulford Place, is a tourist attraction that showcases the success of patent medicine products. It was acquired by the Ontario Heritage Foundation in 1991. In 2001 they formally put a plaque outside his home with a brief biography.

== Ingredients ==
Coated in pink-coloured sugar, an analysis of the pills conducted in 1909 for the British Medical Association revealed them to contain sulphate of iron (green vitriol), potassium carbonate, magnesium hydroxide, powdered liquorice, and sugar. Approximately one third of the iron in the pills had oxidised in the samples analysed, leading to the statement that the pills had been "very carelessly prepared". The formula went through several changes, and at one stage included the laxative Aloe latex, the major ingredient of Beecham's Pills. The Pills were finally withdrawn from the market in the 1970s.
