= George Taylor Fulford =

Canadian politician

The Honourable George Taylor Fulford
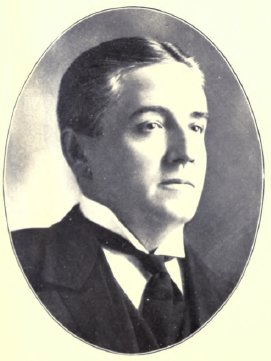

Canadian Senator from Ontario
- In office January 29, 1900 – October 15, 1905
- Appointed by: Wilfrid Laurier

Personal details
- Born: August 8, 1852 Brockville, Canada West
- Died: October 15, 1905 (aged 53) Newton, Massachusetts, U.S.
- Party: Liberal
- Spouse: Mary Wilder White
- Children: 3, including George

George Taylor Fulford (August 8, 1852 – October 15, 1905) was a Canadian businessman and politician.

== Life and family ==
Born in Brockville, Canada West (now Ontario), to a family of United Empire Loyalist stock, he was the youngest son of Hiram Fulford and Martha Harris.

In 1880, Fulford married Mary Wilder White (1856–1946), a socialite from Wisconsin, and had three children. Dorothy Marston (1881–1949), their eldest, married Arthur Charles Hardy, son of former Ontario Premier Arthur Sturgis Hardy, in 1901 in a ceremony at Fulford Place, the family estate. Martha Harris (1883–1910) died young, while giving birth. The long-awaited male heir arrived much later and after one near-fatal miscarriage, when Mary Fulford was 46 years of age. George Taylor II (1902–1987) was a politician himself (Member of the House of Commons of Canada) and owned Fulford Place until his death.

== Education ==
Fulford went to business college in Belleville, Ontario, and apprenticed with his brother, William, who was a dispensing chemist in Brockville. He took over his brother’s modest apothecary in 1874 and eventually built on it to form a successful patent medicine company.

== Professionalism ==
He was elected to the town council in 1879 and served as an alderman for 12 terms. He was involved with the Liberal Party of Canada and became a friend of Sir Wilfrid Laurier. He was appointed to the Canadian Senate in 1900 representing the senatorial division of Brockville, Ontario. He served until his death in 1905.

Fulford served as a pall-bearer at the funeral of his close friend and railway magnate John Ryan on 24 March 1902; alongside fellow Ontario politicians William Henry Comstock, Sir John Morison Gibson, and G.P. Graham.

George Taylor Fulford is reported to be the first Canadian fatal automobile accident victim on record. On October 8, 1905, he was riding in a chauffeured open roadster in Newton, Massachusetts with his business partner Willis T. Hanson, of Schenectady, N.Y., when it slammed into the side of a streetcar while crossing a blind intersection. Fulford died seven days later, at age fifty-three. His widow never remarried. ( W.T. Hanson, not critically injured, continued managing the company's U.S. franchise. The chauffeur died of head trauma October 11.)

Fulford was a philanthropist, giving considerable donations to institutions such as the Brockville Rowing Club, the Wall Street Methodist Church, the Brockville General Hospital, and the YMCA; in his will, he left a large sum of money to establish a home for indigent women. Fulford also donated an impressive silver cup trophy to the Canadian Canoe Association (now Canoe Kayak Canada)The Senator Fulford War Canoe Challenge. Originally awarded in 1902 for the winner of a canoe tug-of-war, and beginning in 1903, awarded to the winner of the Mile War Canoe Race. The trophy was last awarded in 1979, in Welland Ontario, to Cheema Aquatic Club, Waverley Nova Scotia, coached by Frank Garner.

== Business ==
In January 1887, Fulford registered G. T. Fulford & Co. in the Leeds County Registrar, as a vendor and manufacturer of patent medicines. In 1890, a local McGill-trained physician, Dr. William Jackson, sold him the rights to Pink Pills for Pale People for $53.01. This patent medicine would make him a millionaire.

Dr. Williams' Pink Pills for Pale People were marketed in 87 countries worldwide, including Canada, Britain, France, Belgium, South Africa, Singapore, Australia and China. Fulford was an innovative advertiser. He relied heavily on testimonials, submitted by customers, of miraculous recoveries. He would have these printed in newspapers in a way that it was difficult to differentiate news articles from the advertisements, so readers would see headlines proclaiming these miraculous recoveries, and read on to learn that they were saved by Pink Pills. By 1900, he was spending £200,000 yearly in Britain alone on advertising.

Dr William’s Pink Pills for Pale People were sold in Canada for fifty cents per box, or $2.50 for six boxes. Essentially, they were an iron supplement, containing mostly sugar, starch and an iron sulphate. Due to the prevalence of anaemia at this time, the iron-based pills worked as a blood booster for many, thus perpetuating the pill's reputation as a cure-all.

After Fulford’s death, G. T. Fulford & Co. was managed by different associates, and went into receivership in 1989.

== Fulford Place ==
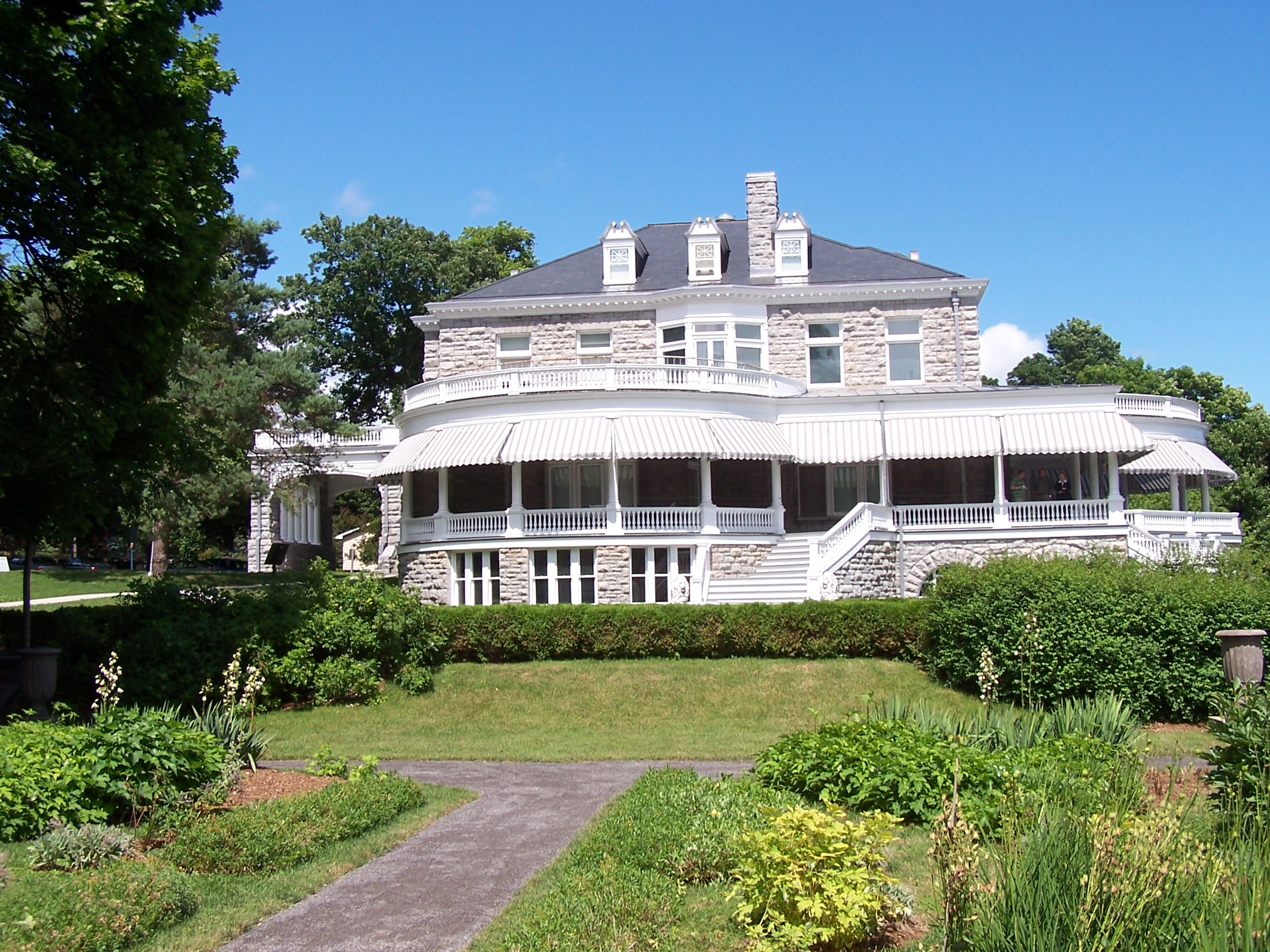
Fulford Place

In 1898, Fulford commissioned an estate, known as Fulford Place, to be built on the King’s Highway, on the eastern edge of Brockville. Designed by architect A.W. Fuller from Albany, New York, Fulford Place was decorated primarily in Beaux-Arts style. It was finished in 1901, and had 35 rooms making up 20,000 square feet. Due to Fulford's role as a politician and businessman, entertaining was one of the primary functions of Fulford Place. Features of the house include a grand hall, a dining room to seat over fifty guests, a spacious verandah, a rococo-style drawing room for the ladies, and a Moorish-style smoking room for the gentlemen. Pictures of Fulford Place, including the grounds, great hall, drawing rooms and artwork, were featured in tourist albums for Brockville, Ontario.

The grounds at Fulford Place were designed by the Olmsted Brothers, and the recently restored formal Italianate garden is a rare example of a privately owned Olmsted-designed garden.

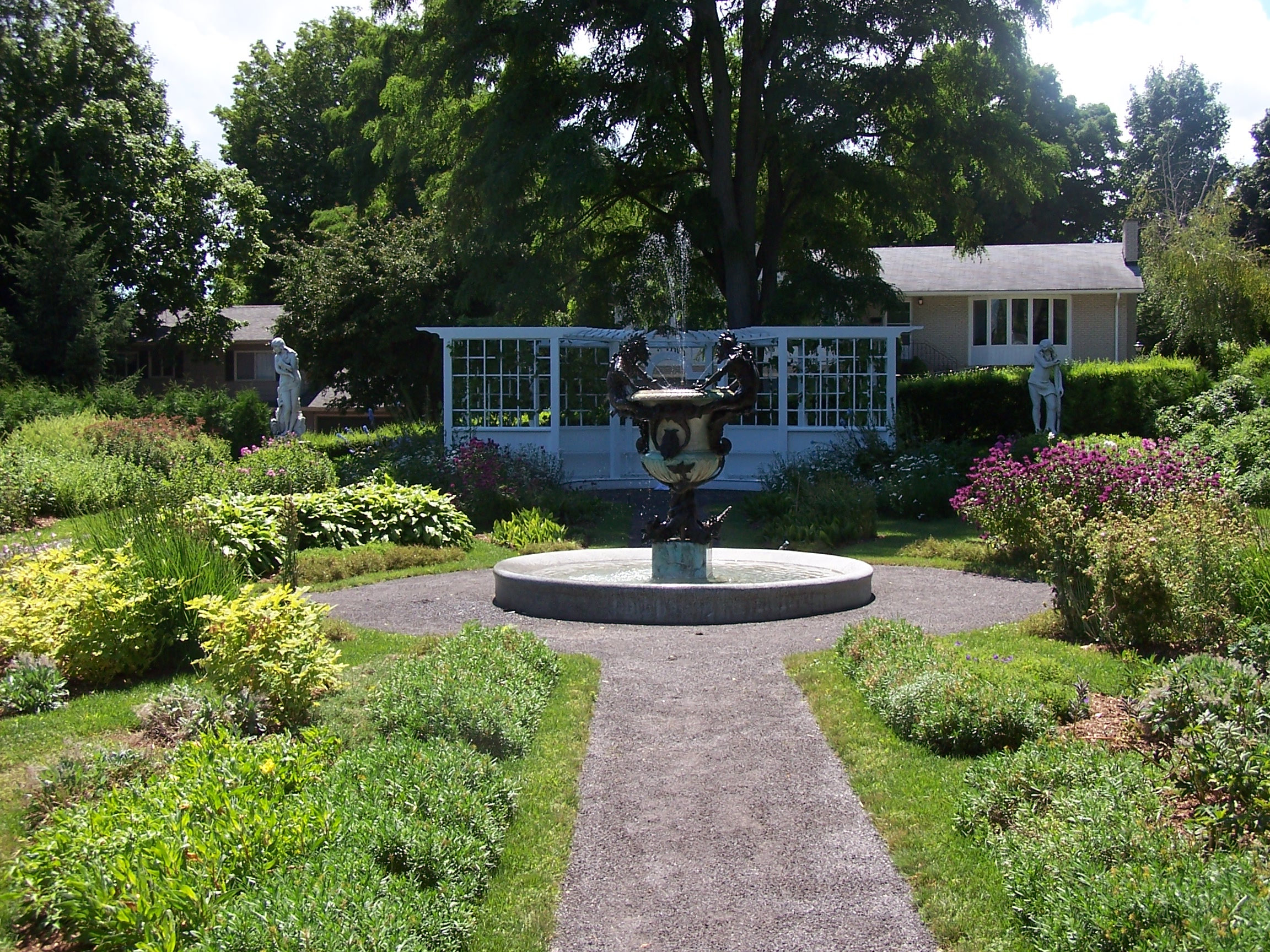
Fulford Place

The property was reduced to three of its original 10 acres (40,000 m^{2}) due to a decline in the family's fortunes in the 1960s. George Taylor Fulford II remained proprietor of Fulford Place until his death, when he bequeathed the estate to the Ontario Heritage Foundation (now Ontario Heritage Trust). All of its original contents were later donated by his widow and his son, George Taylor Fulford III. The property has since been restored, and was opened to the public as a house museum in 1993. It has been interpreted to showcase the Edwardian style of the Fulfords' time using early photographs of rooms (taken for insurance purposes) and a collection of original artifacts. The mansion has been designated a National Historic Site of Canada.

== The steam yacht Magedoma ==
In 1904, Fulford bought a 126-foot (38 m) long steam-powered yacht. Originally named the Cangarda, he rechristened it the Magedoma after his family (MAry, GEorge, DOrothy, MArtha). Among the guests entertained on the yacht were several Canadian prime ministers, as well as the Prince of Wales, the Duke of Kent, and the British prime minister in 1927.

The Fulford family lent the Magedoma to the Royal Canadian Navy during World War II as a training vessel in the St. Lawrence. It was returned to them in 1947, heavily damaged, and with $13,000 in lieu of repairs. The yacht was sold shortly thereafter, and it has since changed hands several times. Today, after being purchased by the Turkish tycoon Rahmi M. Koç, the yacht (renamed Cangarda) has been painstakingly restored and resides in Istanbul at the Rahmi M. Koç Museum. Magedoma Drive, a street in Brockville, was named after the yacht.

== Fulford in literature ==
Canadian author Hugh Hood used Fulford as a model for George Robinson, Sr., a recurring character in his twelve volume The New Age/ Le nouveau siècle series of novels.
