= SY Cangarda =

Luxury steam yacht built in 1901

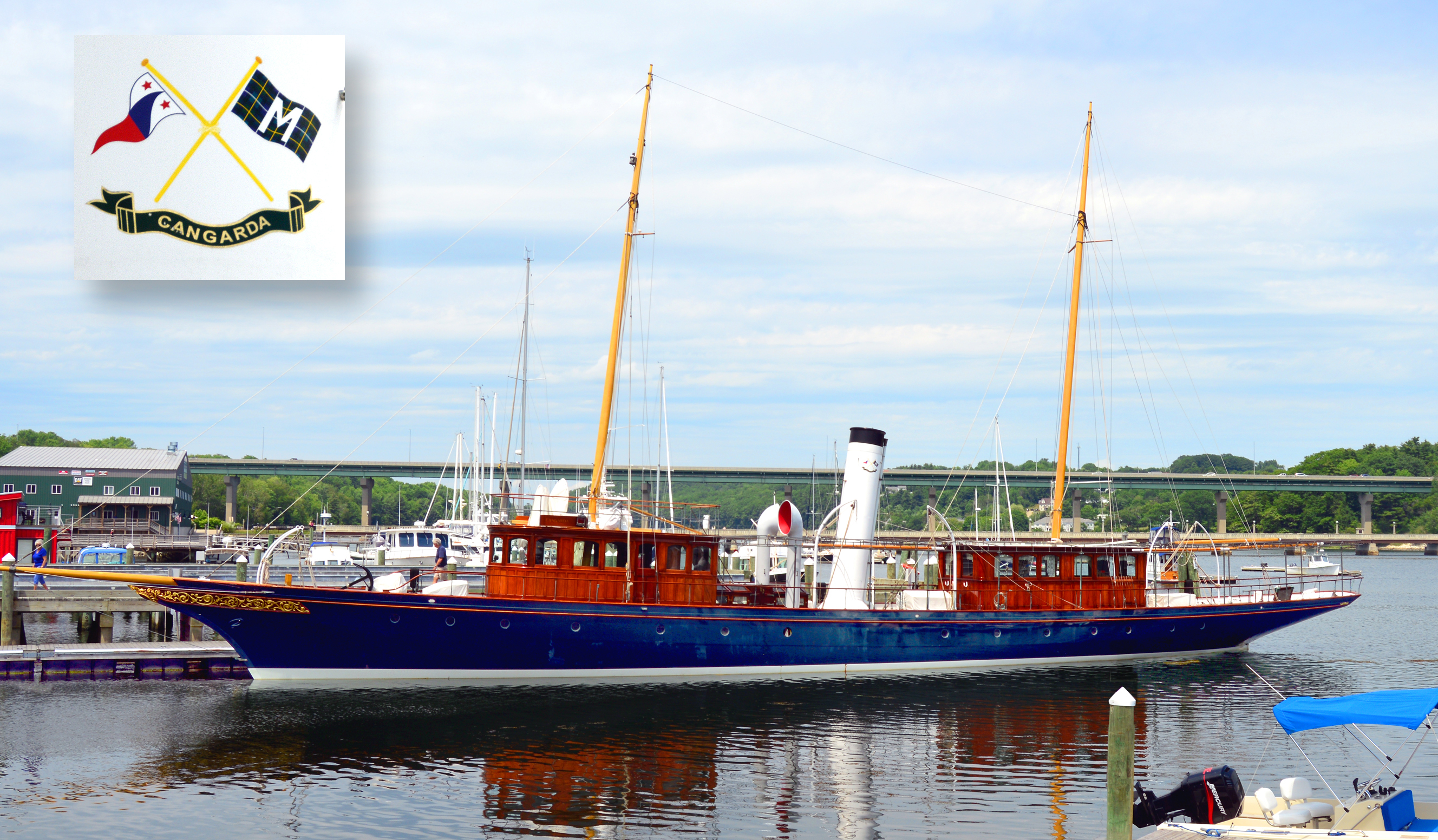
- The Cangarda in July 2017 at Belfast, Maine (inset: the Cangarda name on the stack)

History

United States
- Name: Cangarda
- Builder: Pusey and Jones, Wilmington, Delaware
- Laid down: 2/1901
- Launched: 4/1901
- Completed: 6/1901
- Acquired: 6/1901
- In service: 6/1901
- Out of service: 1946
- Fate: Stripped hull submerged in shallow water for 18 months
- Status: Restored as a private yacht and museum

General characteristics
- Length: 126 ft (38 m)
- Beam: 17 ft 8 in (5.38 m)
- Height: 62 ft (19 m) or 21'
- Draft: 7 ft (2.1 m)-6"."
- Propulsion: Sullivan 14x9x21x14 Steam
- Sail plan: Light schooner rig
- Speed: 12 knots

The Cangarda is a 126-foot (38 m) long luxury steam yacht that was built in 1901 at the Pusey and Jones shipyard in Wilmington, Delaware. It is the only surviving U.S.-built steel steam yacht and one of only three similar yachts remaining worldwide.

After years of service at sea, on inland rivers, on the Great Lakes, and in port as a houseboat, the yacht was in poor condition and sank in Boston Harbor in 1999. Starting in 2004, the boat was restored and modernized in Richmond, California. By 2009, it was back in service as a private yacht.

== History ==
The Cangarda was named as a combination of the last names of the original owners, Michigan lumber mogul Charles Canfield and his wife, Belle Gardner. In 1904, George Taylor Fulford, a wealthy businessman and member of the Senate of Canada, bought the boat and renamed her Magedoma, which was a combination of syllables from the names of his wife and children (MAry, GEorge, DOrothy, MArtha). The boat was docked at Fulford Place, his 20,000-square-foot (1,900 m^{2}) mansion nestled on the banks of the St. Lawrence River in Brockville, Ontario, Canada.

After Fulford's death in 1905, the yacht remained in the family. In 1927, Fulford's widow hosted the then Prince of Wales, his brother Prince George (later Duke of Kent), and the prime ministers of Britain and Canada, Stanley Baldwin and William Lyon Mackenzie King respectively, on board.

During World War II, the boat was lent by the family to the Royal Canadian Navy for use as a training vessel. After the war, the boat was returned to the Fulford family, but in poor condition. The ship was sold to Frederic Burtis Smith, who lived aboard for many years at Rochester, New York. His efforts to preserve the old yacht and carry her into a time when interest in old things was growing can be credited with saving the vessel, but she slowly went into disrepair.

In the early 1980s, an attempt was made to restore her. The ship was disassembled in Boston and an effort was made to rebuild the hull, but the project failed, and in 1999 the gutted hull sank in Boston Harbor. These efforts preserved the interior and machinery for later use.

== Recent History ==
In 2004, Rutherford's Boatshop in Richmond, California began a full restoration and modernization funded by Marin, California resident Bob McNeil, the yacht's owner. The Cangarda’s original hull and keel required rebuilding, laser mapping and computer modeling, and CAD/CAM technology was used throughout. The restored hull was welded, fitted with trim and stabilizer tabs, and equipped with modern generators and other technology to automate the ship as much as possible.

The original Sullivan triple expansion main engine, the six additional steam engines powering auxiliary machinery, and the anchor windlass were reconditioned, and new pipe was fitted throughout.

The existing coal-fired 1911 Almy boiler was replaced with a modern forced-draft oil-fired boiler, and the original condensor was reconditioned for use. Both masts are new, as are the decks. In addition, as much of interior was reinstalled as possible, using the original Cuban mahogany woodwork. The restoration was completed in 2009.

The Cangarda made a voyage to Brockville, Ontario, from June 4 to 5, 2011. Tours of the yacht were available during this time to members of the public, with all proceeds going to The Friends of Fulford Place, a volunteer group that raises funds for the restoration of Fulford Place National Historic Site.

Fulford Place has many Cangarda models and artifacts, including the yacht's original china service. This china has not been returned to the ship despite attempts by the owner and restorers to return it to the vessel, and the renaming of the vessel by the Canadian senator who acquired it used. "Reproduction" china has been substituted on board.'

In 2015, Cangarda arrived at Front Street Shipyard in Belfast, Maine, where she underwent another refit. Over the following nine years, the shipyard maintained her during winters while she spent summer months cruising around the Maine islands under private ownership.

In 2024, Cangarda was purchased by the Turkish tycoon Rahmi Koç and exhibited at the Rahmi M. Koç Museum of Istanbul.
