= Spine pad =

British military kit for hot climates

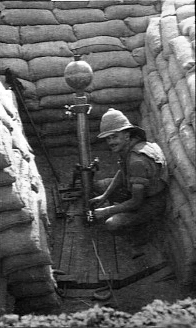
A British Army soldier with a spine pad serving circa 1917/18 in the Mesopotamian campaign

The Spine Pad (or "spine protector") was an item of military kit used by the British Army when on service in hot climates. It was a piece of cloth, often quilted, designed to protect the spine from heat from the sun. The effect of the sun on the spine was thought to be dangerous in terms of developing fever and sunstroke. The Imperial War Museum has one.

== See also ==
- Cholera belt
- Pith helmet
