= Birkbeck Building =

Coordinates: 43.6508°N 79.3779°W

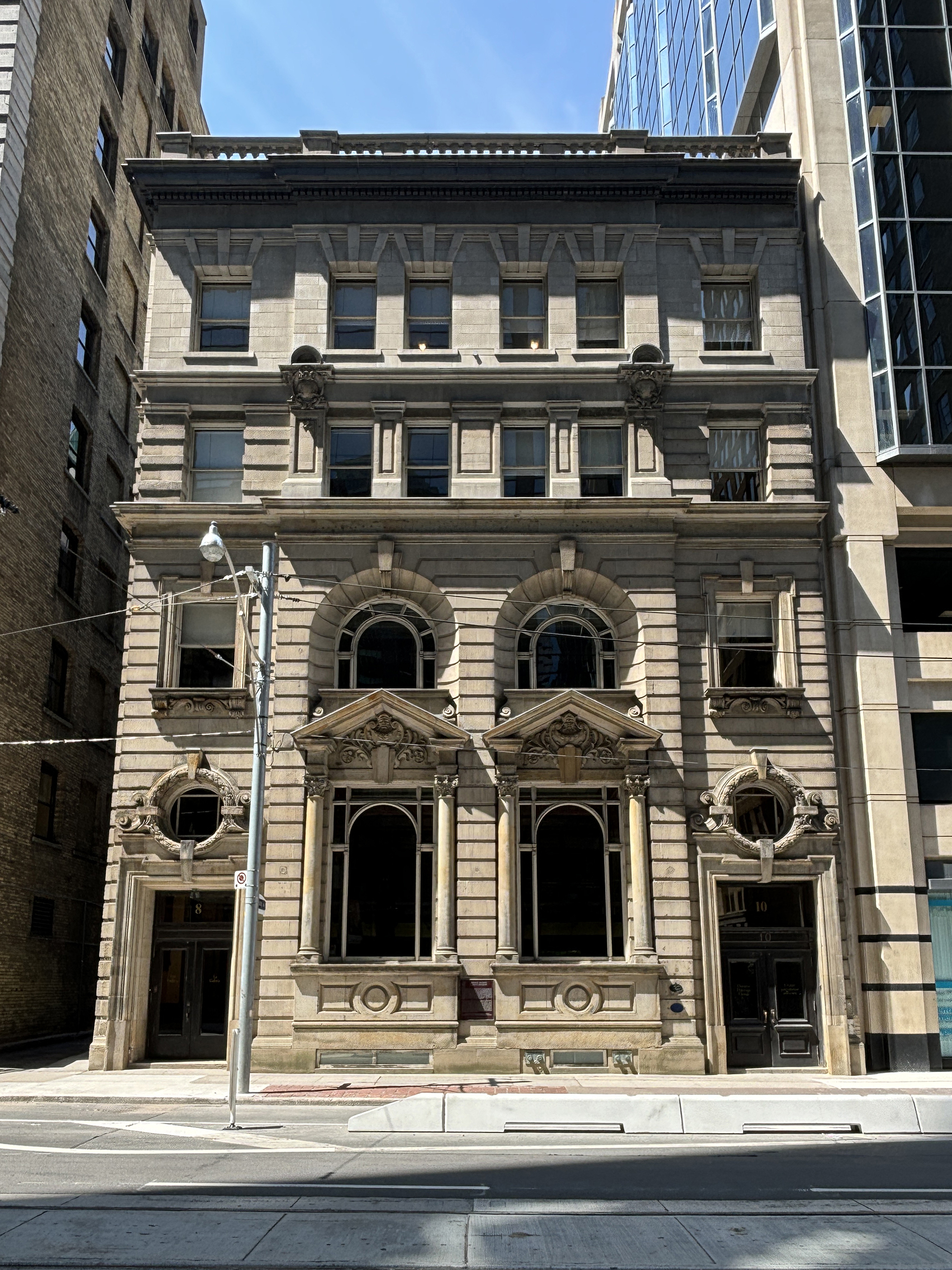

General information
- Type: Office building
- Architectural style: Edwardian Baroque
- Location: 8-10 Adelaide Street East, Toronto, Ontario, Canada
- Completed: 1910

Technical details
- Floor count: 4

Design and construction
- Architect(s): George W. Gouinlock

National Historic Site of Canada
- Designated: 1986/06/16

Ontario Heritage Act
- Designated: 1976

The Birkbeck Building is a four-storey office building in downtown Toronto, Ontario, Canada. It is a National Historic Site of Canada and is protected under Part IV of the Ontario Heritage Act since 1976 with an Ontario Heritage Trust easement on the property.

== History ==
It was built in 1908–10 for the Canadian Birkbeck Investment and Savings Company. It was designated a National Historic Site in 1986 as an example of a transitional building which combines historical style with modern technology. The Ontario Heritage Foundation restored it in 1987 to use for their offices. The Ontario Heritage Act designation notes that it was built for the Canadian Birkbeck Investment and Savings Company in 1908, designed by George W. Gouinlock. The City of Toronto designated the property in 1976 and the Ontario Heritage Trust holds an easement on the property since 1985. "This former financial building boasts an impressive marble lobby, manually operated elevator and beaux arts architecture. The Gallery, with a separate street-level entrance, has high ceilings, a second-storey mezzanine and an elegant staircase. The Birkbeck Room, located on the second floor, has original oak-trimmed windows, a dedicated foyer and cloakroom, as well as access to the Oval Boardroom."

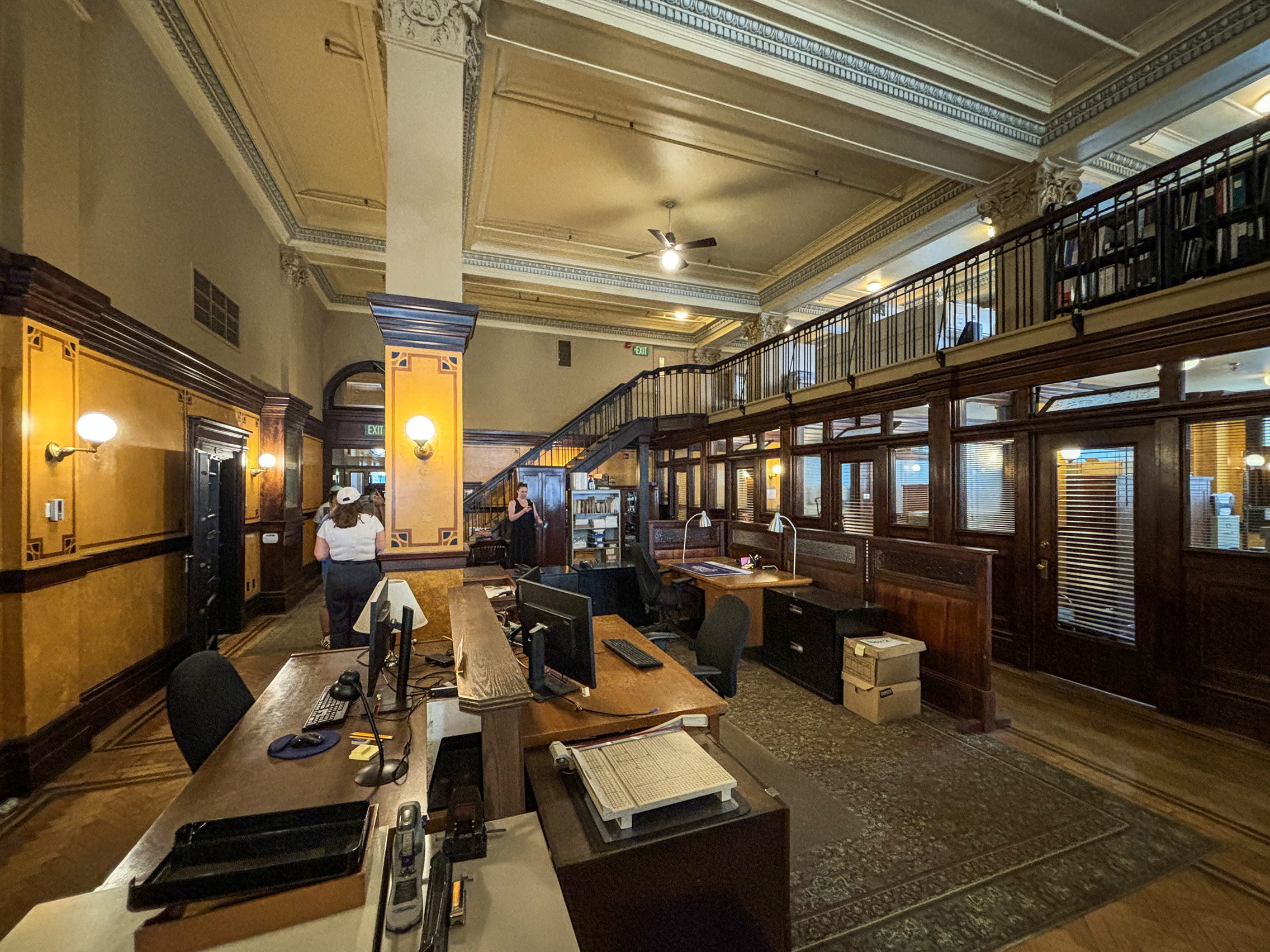
Ontario Heritage Centre Office

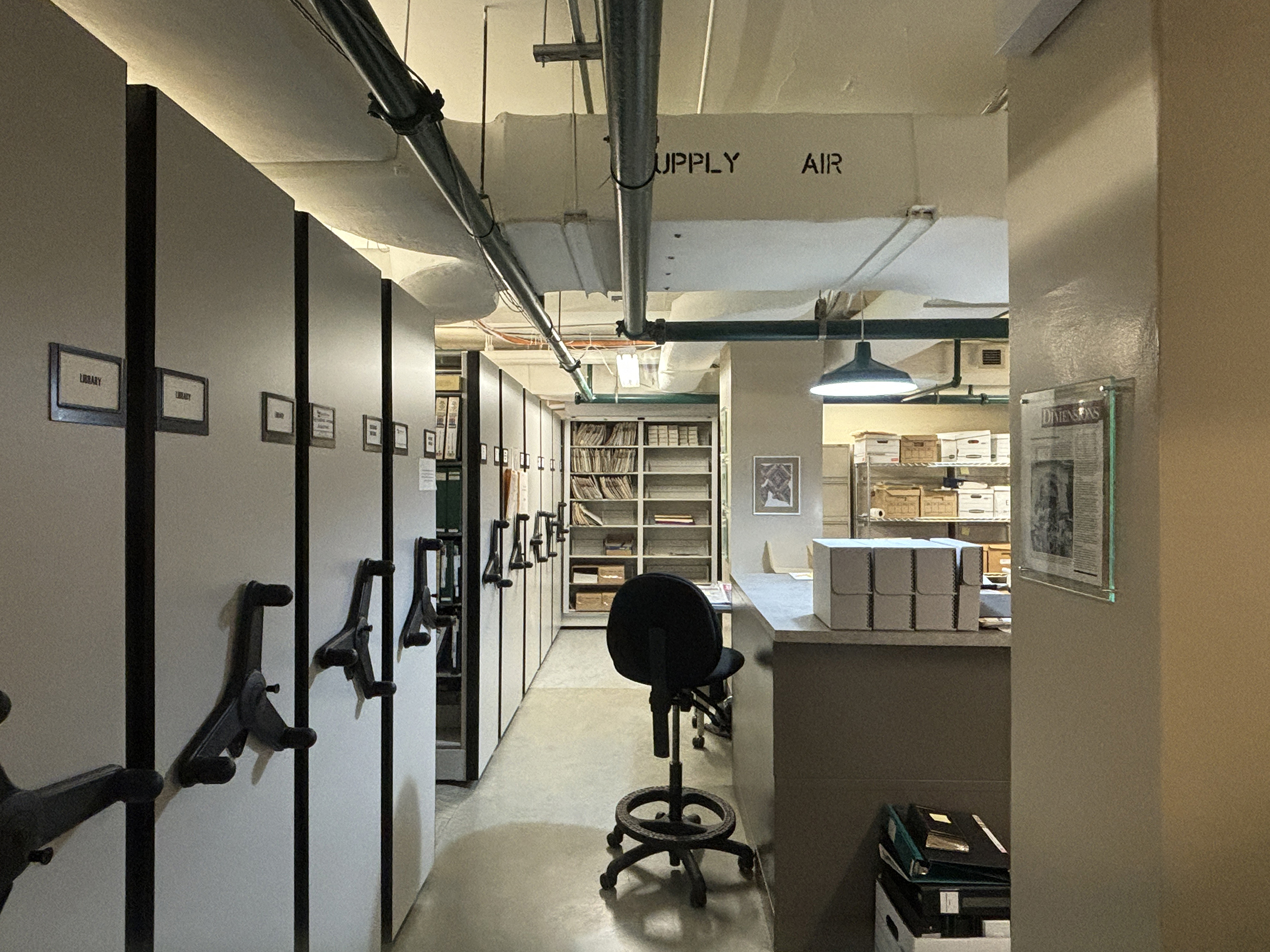
Archive room in basement

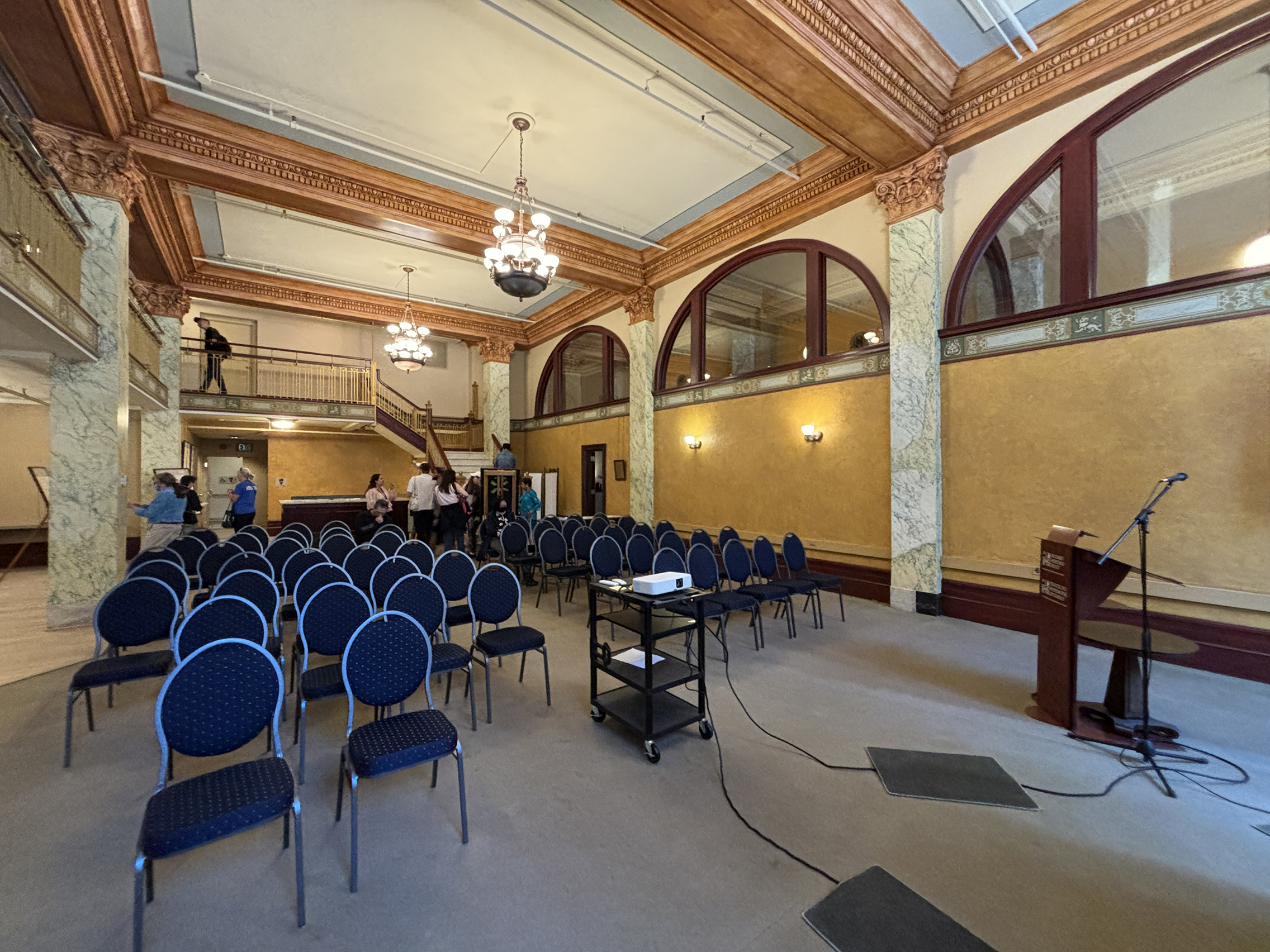
The Gallery

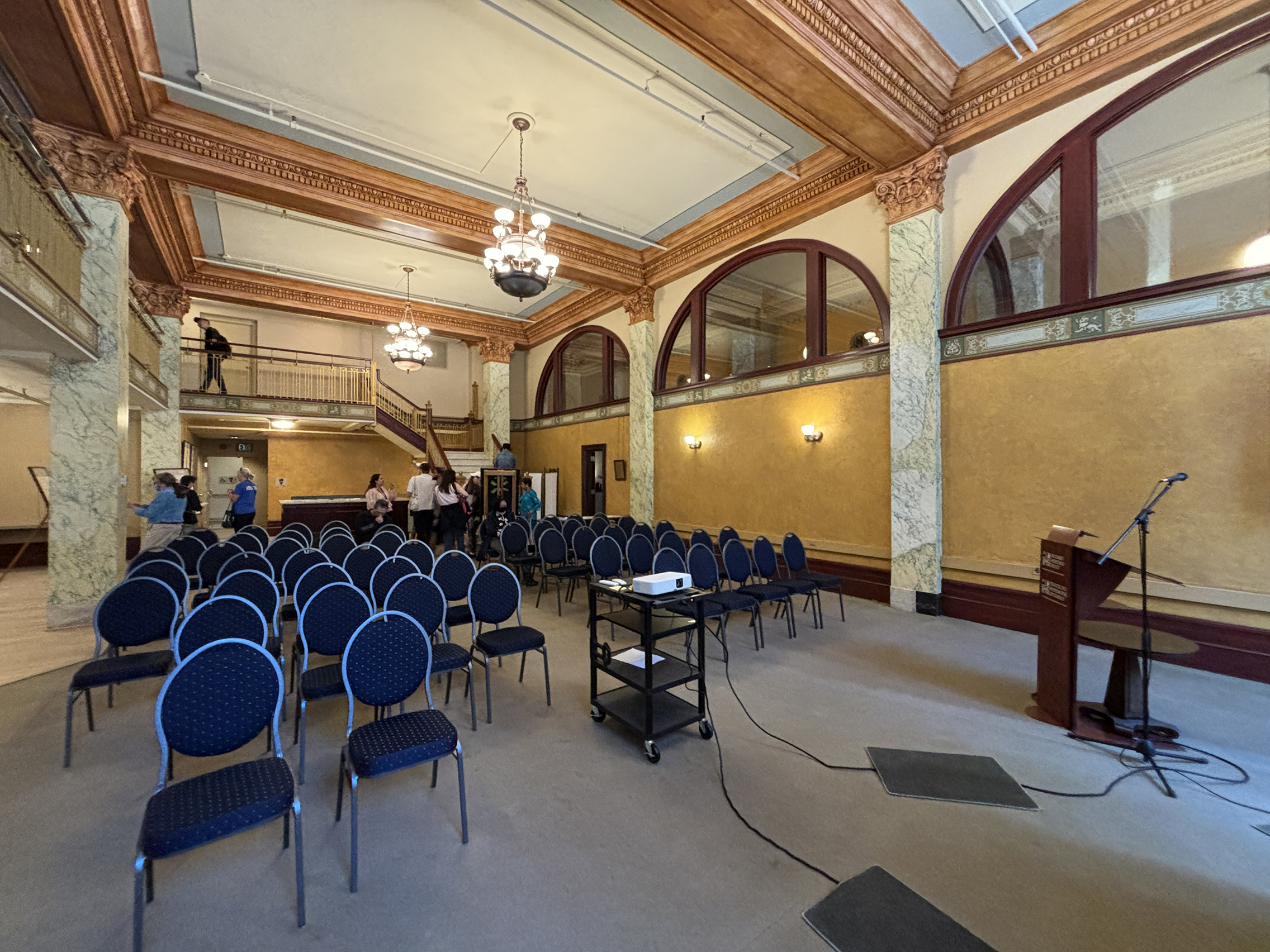
Lift inside the building

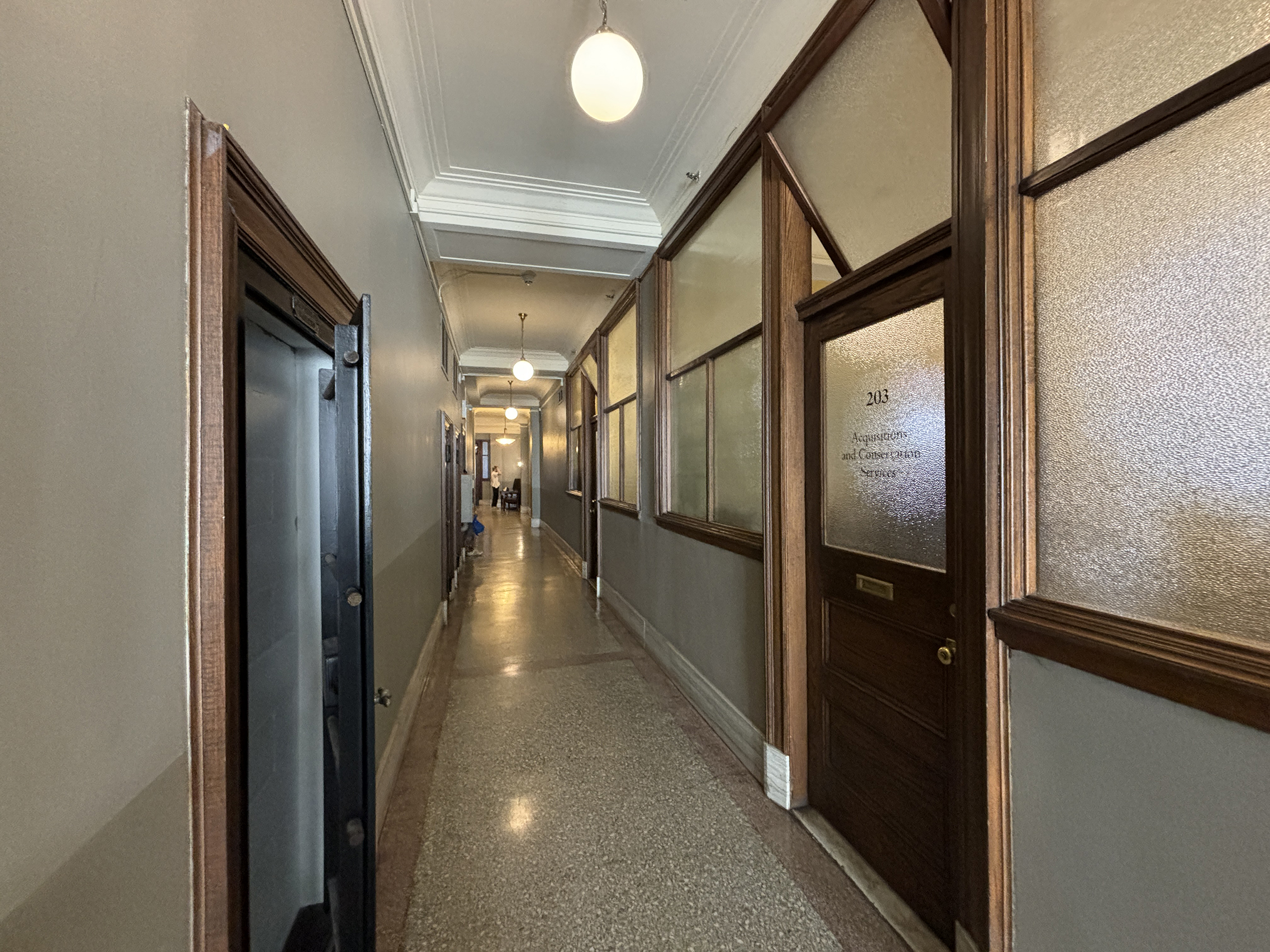
Level 2 corridor

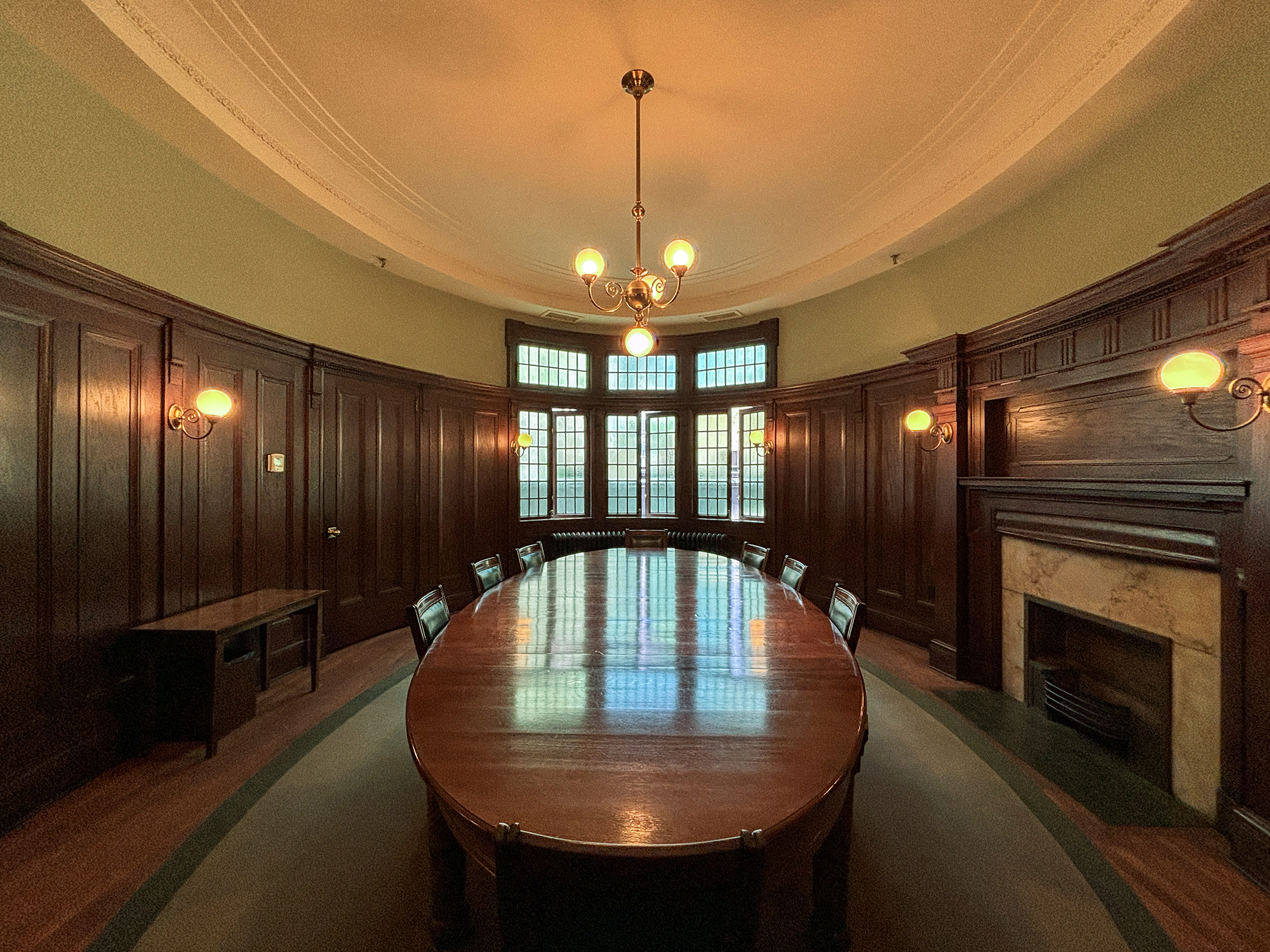
John Graves Simcoe Room
