= Fulford Place =

Historic mansion in Brockville, Ontario, Canada

Coordinates: 44.59728°N 75.67079°W

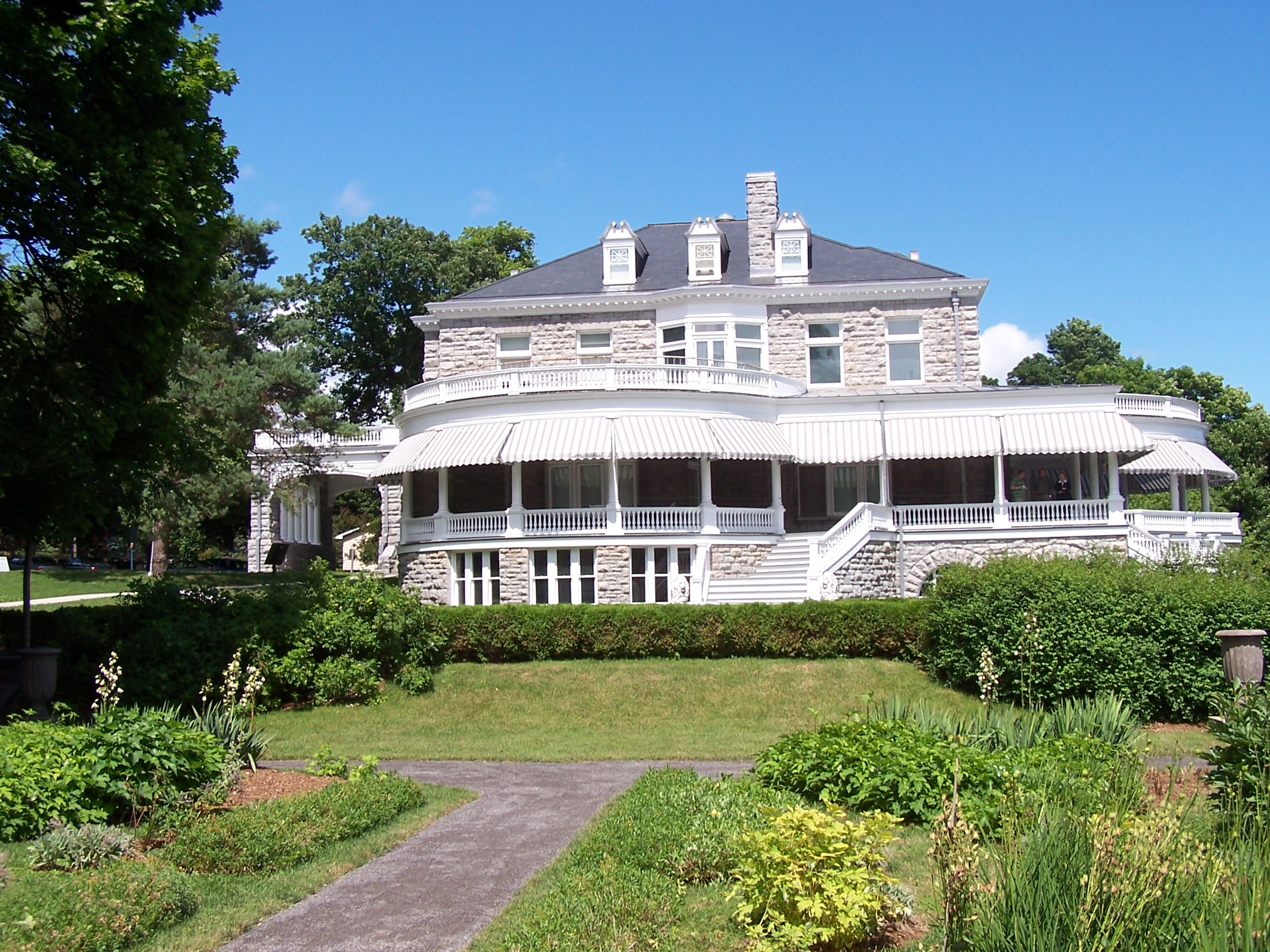
- Interactive map of Fulford Place
- Location: 287 King Street East; Brockville, Ontario

History
- Built: 1899–1901
- Built for: George Taylor Fulford
- Original use: Private residence
- Current use: Historic house museum

Site notes
- Architect: Albert W. Fuller (house); Olmsted Brothers (garden)
- Governing body: Ontario Heritage Trust
- Website: Fulford Place webpage

National Historic Site of Canada
- Designated: 1992

Fulford Place is a historic mansion in Brockville, Ontario, Canada. It was completed in 1901 for Senator George Taylor Fulford, a Canadian businessman and politician. The home is now a historic house museum reflecting Edwardian era decorations, and it is operated by the Ontario Heritage Trust. It was designated a National Historic Site of Canada in 1992.

== History ==
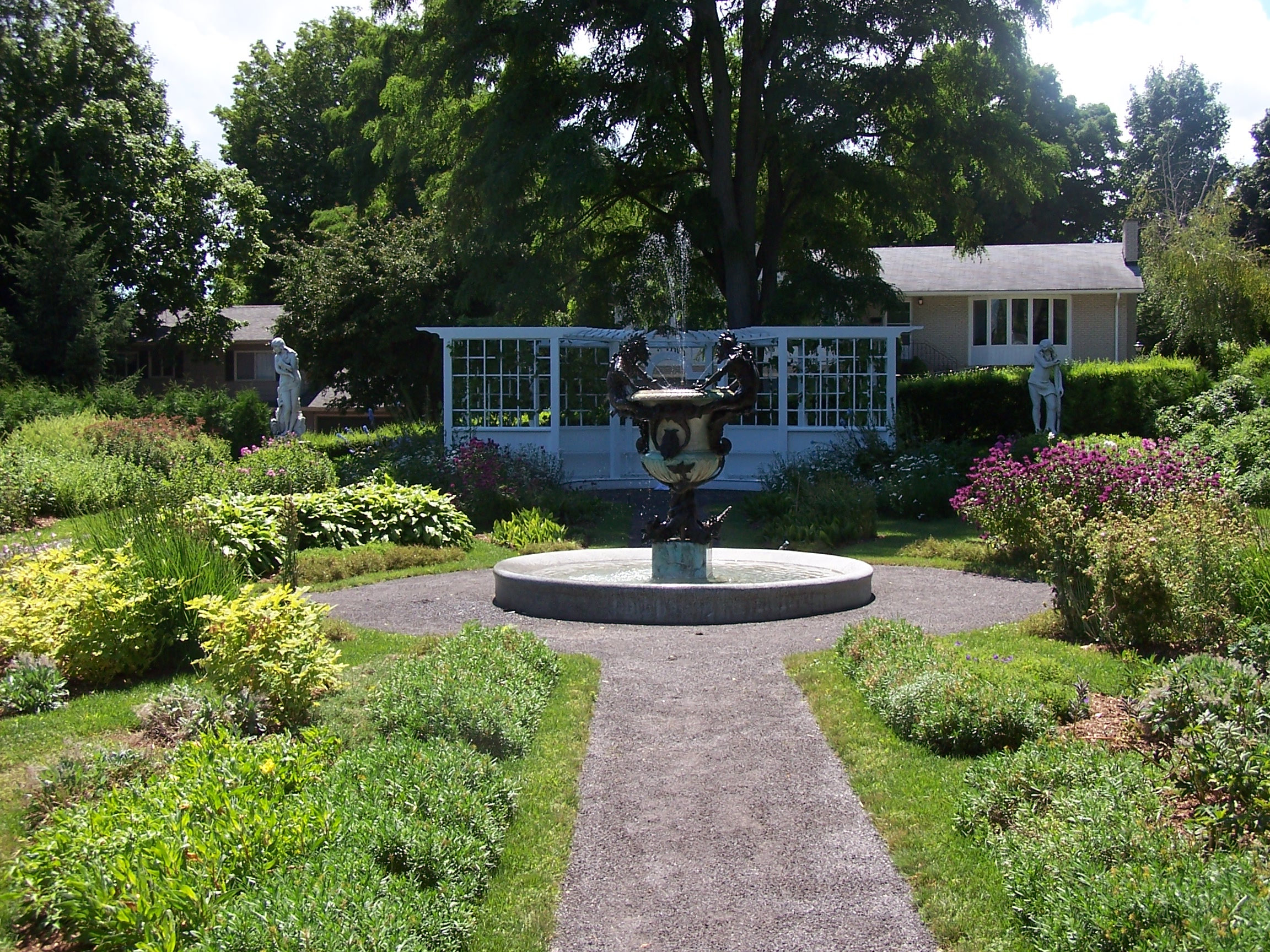
The Italianate garden, designed by the Olmsted Brothers

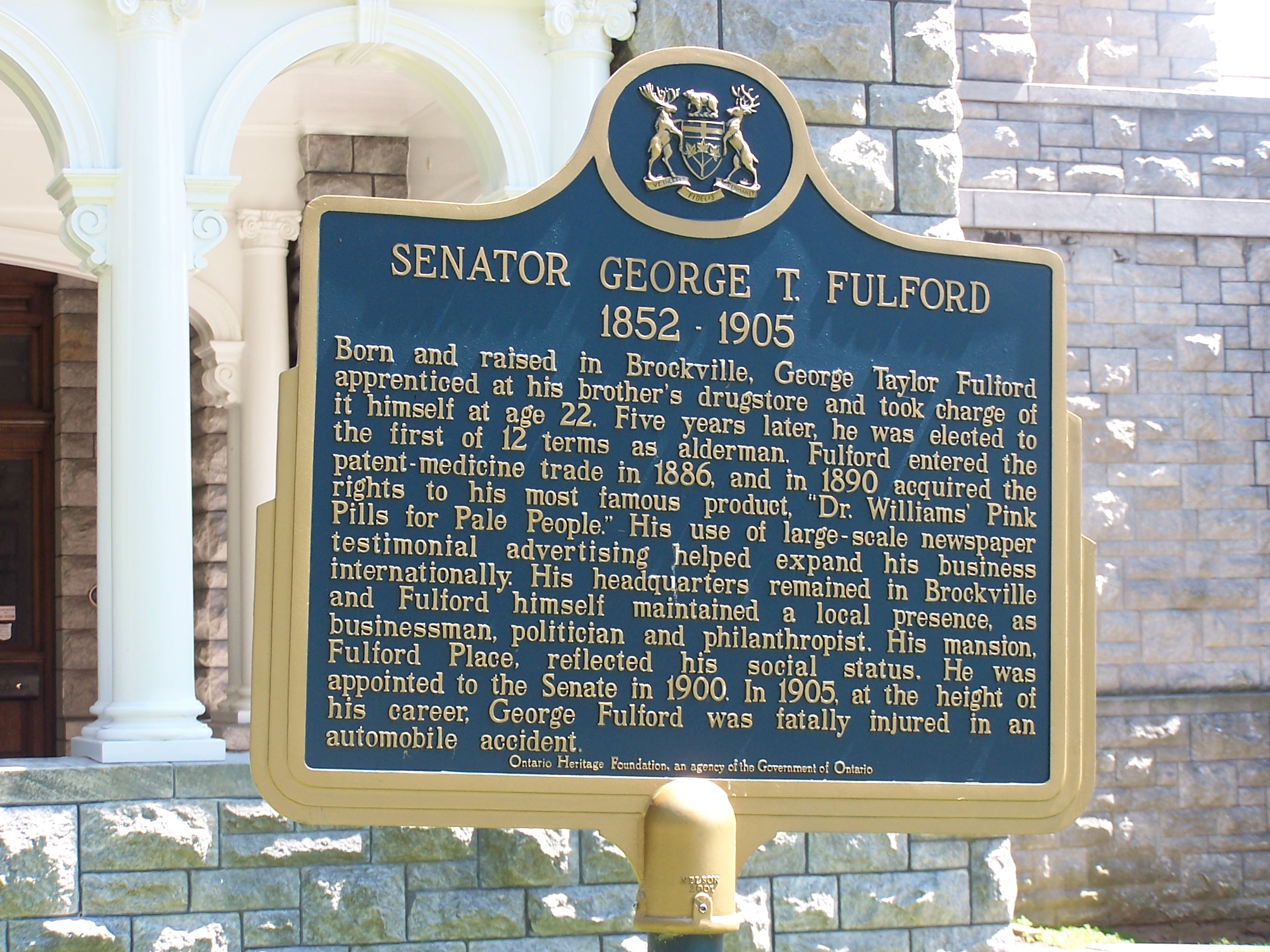
Ontario Heritage Trust plaque

After purchasing a patent for Dr. Williams' Pink Pills for Pale People in 1890 and making a fortune selling the pills, the Fulfords had a mansion built for them in Brockville, on the shore of the St. Lawrence River where several other beautiful estates were located, many of which were owned by other successful business people. In 1898, the Fulfords commissioned their estate to be built on the King’s Highway, on the eastern edge of Brockville. Architect Albert W. Fuller from Albany, New York, designed Fulford Place, and it was elaborately decorated in the Beaux-Arts style. It was built between 1899 and 1901, and had 35 rooms making up 20,000 square feet.

Since Fulford was an important figure in both the political world and the business scene, entertaining was one of Fulford Place’s primary functions. The house thus contains a grand hall, a dining room to seat over thirty guests, a spacious veranda, and a rococo-style drawing room for the ladies. A Moorish-style smoking room was adjacent to a billiard room for the gentlemen.

Notably, the grounds at Fulford Place were designed by the Olmsted Brothers, and the recently restored formal Italianate garden is a rare and important example of a privately owned Olmsted-designed garden.

The property was reduced to three of its original 10 acres (4.0 ha) when George Taylor Fulford II was forced to section off prime lots of real estate to sell in order to afford the maintenance of the house. He remained proprietor of Fulford Place until his death, when he bequeathed it to the Ontario Heritage Foundation (now Ontario Heritage Trust). All of its original contents were later donated by his widow and his son, George Taylor Fulford III.

== Fulford family ==
George Taylor Fulford was born in Brockville in 1852 and attended school in Belleville for business, when he met his future wife, Mary Wilder Fulford (née White). Mary was a Wisconsin socialite and had a ten-year courtship with George through letters before they married in 1880. They had three children: Dorothy Marston Fulford (1881–1949), Martha Harris Fulford (1883-1910), and George Taylor Fulford II (1902-1987). In 1900 George Fulford was appointed to the Senate by Prime Minister Sir Wilfried Laurier, making George both Business man and Senator; however, in 1905 George Fulford died after an automobile accident while on a business trip in Newton, MA. He was the first Canadian to die in a car accident. His daughter Dorothy married Arthur Charles Hardy in 1904, while Martha was married twice before dying in childbirth in 1910. Mary Fulford lived at Fulford Place with her son George until her death in 1946. George Fulford II married Josephine Weller and the two resided at Fulford Place with their three children; Martha, Dwight and George III.

== Museum ==
The Trust did extensive restoration on the house, and opened it to the public as a historic house museum in 1993. It has been interpreted to how it looked in the Edwardian era; this was done relatively accurately because of the existence of early photographs of rooms (taken for insurance purposes) and a collection of original artifacts (not reproductions). Among the original furnishings and artifacts are; a butterfly Steinway piano gifted to Mary Fulford by her husband, and a Tiffany Dragon Fly Lamp. The opulent and lavishly furnished mansion has been designated a National Historic Site of Canada, and is a major tourist attraction in the Brockville area.

The Museum is affiliated with: CMA, CHIN, and Virtual Museum of Canada.

== Fulford Place in film ==
Little Gloria... Happy at Last (1982): several of the mansion's rooms, including the drawing room and bedrooms, as well as the exterior, were used for filming this TV movie about the real-life story of Gloria Vanderbilt.
