= Cholera belt =

19th-century military anti-cholera medical device

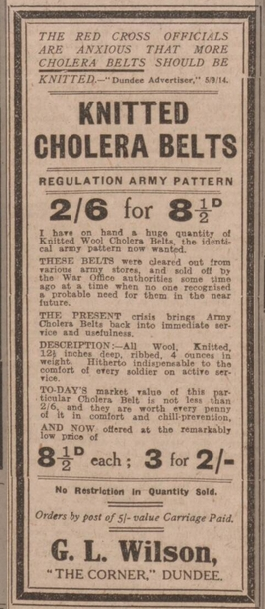
1914 advertisement

The cholera belt was a flat strip of (usually red) flannel or knitted wool, about six feet long and six inches wide, that was wrapped around the bare abdomen. The item was standard army issue, and was purported to prevent the wearer from contracting cholera, dysentery, and other ailments believed to be caused by chilling of the abdomen. The belt's use continued decades after the causative link between pathogen-contaminated drinking water and cholera was established.

== History ==
Attempts to prevent illness by wearing flannel body wraps date to the early 1700s. In 1707 Jeremiah Wainewright wrote "'I was perswaded'(sic) ... to wear Flannel next to my Skin some ten Years ago for a severe Cough ... I received some advantage'", and in 1726 author Richard Towne wrote, "'those who are subject to habitual Looseness may receive great Benefit by wearing Flannel and keeping their Bodies warm'". By 1799 the British army promoted a "flannel bandage to the whole abdomen," with surgeon Robert Jackson in 1817 recommending "the application of 'flannel over the abdomen, adding such pressure to it by a flannel roller'" to prevent dysentery, and James Annesley writing in 1828 that "'use of a thick flannel banyan and cummerband during the Monsoon will ... exert considerable influence in preventing bowel complaints'".

According to historian E.T. Renbourn, flannel waistcoats and belts were commonly worn by British soldiers before the 1830s but as cholera epidemics spread from 1817 to the 1830s, fear spread leading to reports in the Cholera Gazette that soldiers should wear flannel to prevent cholera, possibly originating in the Polish-Russian War of 1830-31 though a "cholera belt" was not mentioned. Renbourn writes that although the phrase "cholera belt" was not being specifically mentioned in print, it was "being used fairly widely by the populace in general". It was not until 1848 when, Instructions to Army Medical Officers for their Guidance on the Appearance of the Spasmodic Cholera included the suggestion that every soldier should be provided two "cholera belts". In 1849 an anonymous author published the pamphlet "What has Cholera done in London?" advising "readers to wear a folded flannel belt around the belly ... recommended by the Board of Health'".

J. McGrigor Croft, M.D. writing in the Westminster, England Marylebone Mercury in 1866 that he was the inventor of the cholera belt. Croft states that he did this to "aid the poor" and then describes how to make the belt out of ordinary flannel in the hopes that anyone will be able to make their own. He states that two medical doctors of his acquaintance vouch for the invention. He calls it an "abdominal respirator; it permits the heated perspiration of the body to pass off without any chance of chill ... without any inconvenience such as found in the old cholera belt". Croft goes on to say that he has declined the patent and gives it to the public freely.

Surgeon in the Bengal Army, Andrew Duncan in 1888 wrote that "'Cholera belts must be stringently insisted on ... and there should be periodic inspection - and without warning - to see that men are wearing them'". In 1898, The San Francisco Call reported that the belt is a "good thing for the troops" quoting advice from a Major Edward Field "that no soldier should think of going to Manila without a cholera belt". And although it is impossible to take everything a soldier would need in the tropics, the cholera belt holds the highest place in the emergency list".

In 1914, donations by the tiny village of Middlemarch, New Zealand of items such as tobacco, shirts and tinned fruit for soldiers going to fight in World War I, included "26 cholera belts". The idea of abdominal chilling as a factor in illness was brought up as late as 1947 although it was rejoined by those who pointed out that the idea was not based on experimental evidence.

Renbourn sums up the history of cholera belts as an interest in wearing them fluctuated whether an outbreak was happening nearby or not. The argument seems to be that it "prevented suppression of 'perspiration' and the consequent flow of blocked excretions to the bowel".

In 1946, L. E. Napier wrote in Principles and Practice of Tropical Medicine that "The flannel cholera belt, whose powers of cholera prevention were of course mythical ... has fortunately gone out of fashion".
