= Robert Jackson (surgeon, born 1750) =

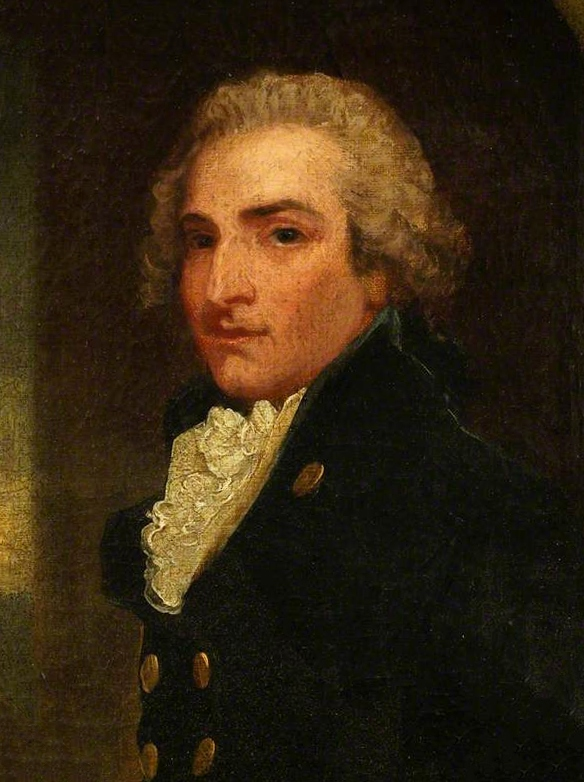
Robert Jackson

Robert Jackson M.D. (1750–1827) was a Scottish physician-surgeon, reformer, and inspector-general of army hospitals.

== Life ==
He was born at Stonebyres, near the Falls of Clyde, he was the son of a small farmer. After schooling at Wandon and Crawford he was apprenticed for three years to a surgeon at Biggar, and in 1768 joined the medical classes at Edinburgh. Supporting himself by going twice on a whaling voyage as surgeon, he finished his studies without graduating, and went to Jamaica, where he acted as assistant to a doctor at Savanna-la-mer from 1774 to 1780. He next made his way to New York, with the intention of joining the state volunteers; but he was eventually received by the colonel of a Scottish regiment (the 71st) as ensign, with the duties of hospital-mate.

He arrived at Greenock in 1782, and travelled to London on foot. He left early in 1783 on a journey on foot through France, Switzerland, Germany, and Italy, and landed on his return at Southampton with four shillings in his pocket. He walked to London, and thence, in January 1784, to Perth where the 71st regiment was stationed. Coming at length to Edinburgh he remained two or three months, and married the daughter of Dr. Stephenson, and the niece of an officer whom he had known in New York. His wife's fortune placed him in easy circumstances, and he spent the next year in Paris, attending hospitals and studying languages (including Arabic), and then went to Leyden, where he passed an examination for M.D. in 1786.

Jackson settled as a physician at Stockton-on-Tees, and remained there seven years. When war broke out in 1793, he was appointed surgeon to the 3rd regiment (Buffs), on the strength of a book which he had published on West Indian fevers. Not being connected with the College of Physicians of London he was ineligible for the office of army physician; but he received the promotion in 1794, after the personal intervention of the Duke of York. This incident was the beginning of Jackson's resolute opposition to the monopoly of the College of Physicians and to the administration of the old army medical board. A new system was put in place by 1810, with an open career from the lowest to the highest ranks of the army medical service. While campaign he wrote seven pamphlets (from 1803 to 1809), was obliged to retire from active service, and committed an assault on Keate, the surgeon-general, striking him across the shoulders with his gold-headed cane, and suffered six months' imprisonment. The overthrow of the monopoly was hastened by incompetence in the disastrous Walcheren expedition. Jackson had many supporters, among them Dr. James McGrigor.

Meanwhile, from 1794 to 1798, he had been on active service in Holland and in the West Indies, acquiring experience which formed the basis of his major works. In 1811, his old enemies being now out of the way, he was recalled from his retirement at Stockton to be medical director in the West Indies, in which office he remained until 1815. He retired on half-pay as inspector-general of army hospitals, and a pension was later granted him. In 1819, when yellow fever was in Spain, he visited the Mediterranean. He died of paralysis at Thursby, near Carlisle, on 6 April 1827. Four children of his first marriage predeceased him. His second wife, who survived him, was a daughter of J. H. Tidy, rector of Redmarshall, County Durham.

== Works ==
Jackson's first book was 'A Treatise on the Fevers of Jamaica,’ 1791 (reprinted at Philadelphia in 1795, and in German at Leipzig in 1796), the result of his early experience as an assistant. He recommends the treatment of fevers by cold affusion, which was afterwards advocated by James Currie, and by himself in a special essay published at Edinburgh in 1808. His San Domingo experiences of 1796 were embodied in his next work, 'An Outline of the History and Cure of Fever, Epidemic and Contagious, more especially of Jails, Ships, and Hospitals, and the Yellow Fever. With Observations on Military Discipline and Economy, and a Scheme of Medical Arrangement for Armies,’ Edinburgh, 1798; German edition, Stuttgart, 1804. He took up military medical arrangements again in 1804 in his best-known work, 'A Systematic View of the Formation, Discipline, and Economy of Armies,’ which was republished by him at Stockton in 1824, and finally at London in 1845, with portrait and memoir. Part ii. of this work is a philosophical sketch of 'national military character' from ancient and modern sources.

In 1817 appeared his 'History and Cure of Febrile Diseases,’ relating chiefly to soldiers in the West Indies, 1819; 2nd edit., enlarged to 2 vols., 1820. His 'Observations of the Yellow Fever in Spain' was published in 1821. In 1823 he published at Stockton 'An Outline of Hints for the Political Organization and Moral Training of the Human Race.'
