= Ontario Heritage Trust =

Non-profit heritage agency of the Ontario Ministry of Tourism and Culture

- Fiducie du patrimoine ontarien
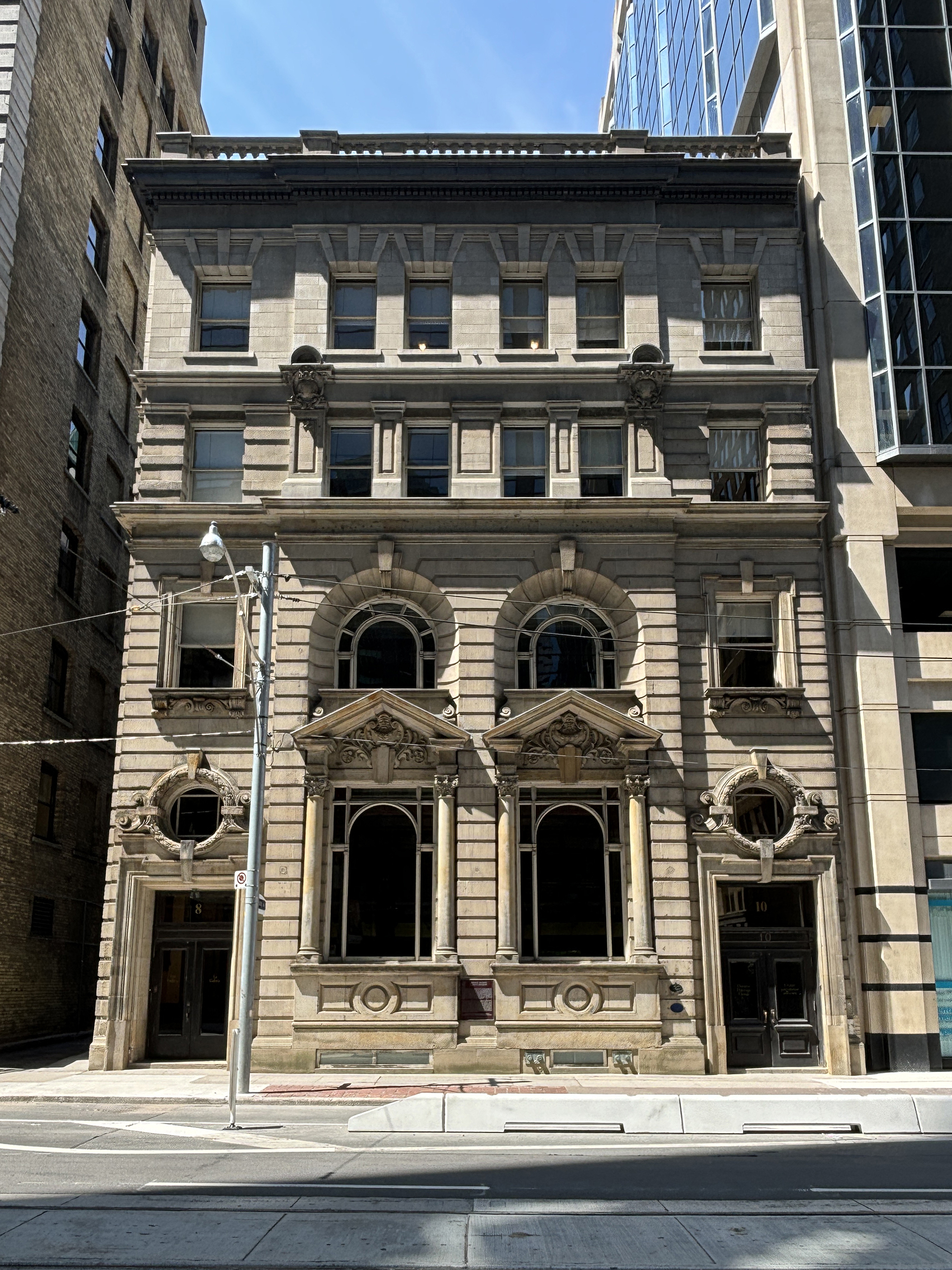
- The agency headquarters, the Birkbeck Building, in 2022

Agency overview
- Formed: 1967
- Preceding agencies: Archaeological and Historic Sites Board; Ontario Heritage Foundation
- Type: Crown agency
- Jurisdiction: Government of Ontario
- Headquarters: 10 Adelaide Street East; Toronto, Ontario; M5C 1J3
- Minister responsible: Stan Cho, Ministry of Tourism, Culture and Gaming
- Agency executive: John Ecker, Chair
- Key document: Ontario Heritage Act
- Website: www.heritagetrust.on.ca

The Ontario Heritage Trust (French: Fiducie du patrimoine ontarien) is a crown agency of the Ontario Ministry of Tourism, Culture and Gaming. It is responsible for protecting, preserving and promoting the built, natural and cultural heritage of the Canadian province of Ontario. The Trusts headquarters are housed in the Ontario Heritage Centre, also known as the Birkbeck Building, itself a designated heritage building and National Historic Site.

== History ==
The trust traces its origins to the Archaeological and Historic Sites Board during the 1950s. It was incorporated into the Ontario Heritage Foundation in 1967 by the Ontario legislature. Its name was changed to the Ontario Heritage Trust in 2005 by an amendment to the Ontario Heritage Act.

== Provincial Plaque Program ==
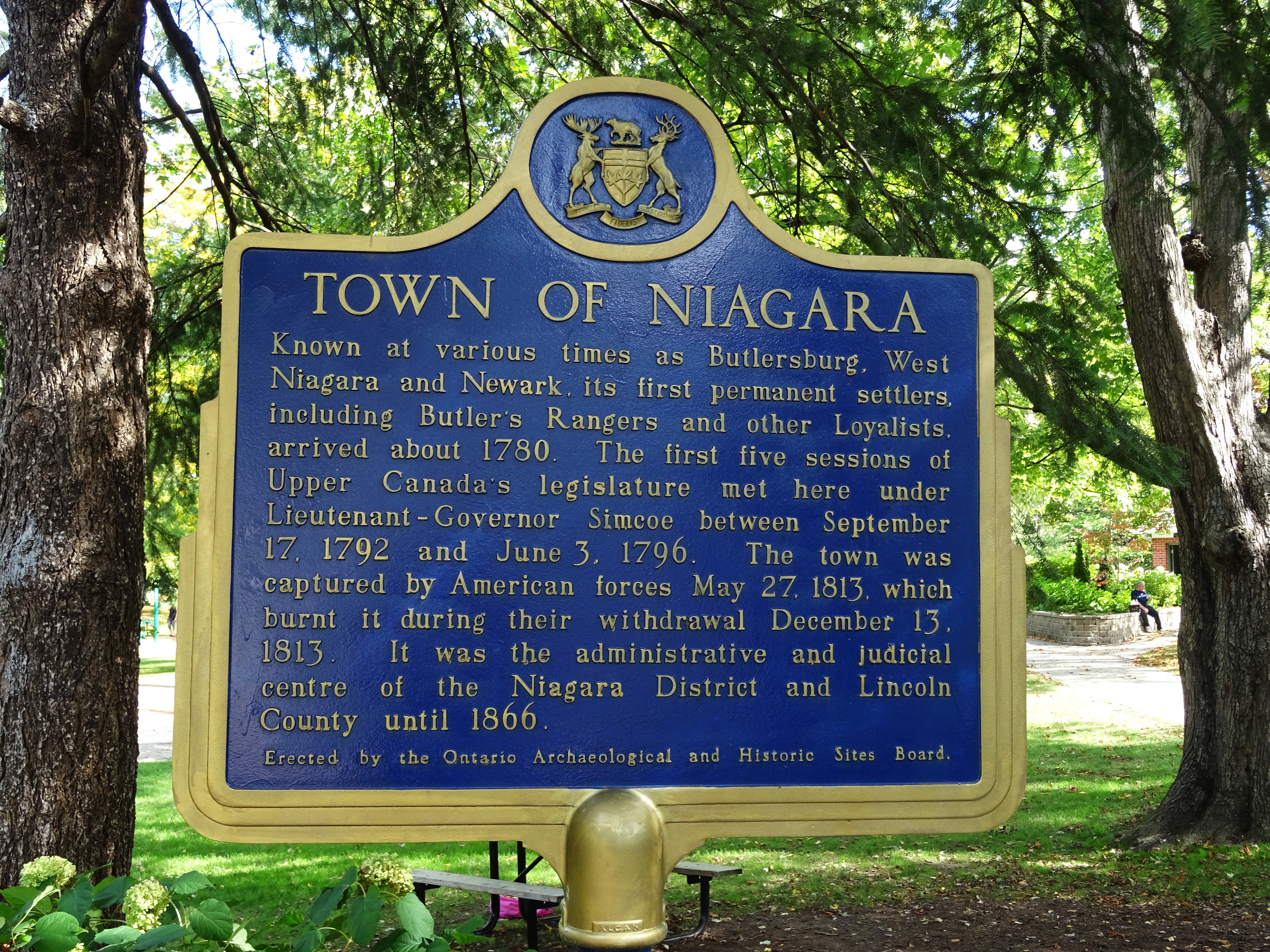
A plaque in Niagara-on-the-Lake

The Trust administers the Provincial Plaque Program, which began in 1955. Since the installation of the first plaque at Port Carling, it has erected 1,287 blue-and-gold plaques, the vast majority of which are found across Ontario, but also in France, Germany, Ireland, the Netherlands, the United Kingdom and the United States.

In 2018, the Trust began reviewing its plaques for 'outdated interpretations and terminology', with plaques such as the Shingwauk Hall Residential Schools plaque in Sault Ste. Marie being replaced after it was vandalized in 2021.

== Ontario Sports Awards ==
In 1965 the Ontario Heritage Trust began honouring sports achievements, with the Ontario Sport Awards Program being formally established in 1975.

== Ontario Heritage Trust buildings ==
Some of the properties managed in whole or in part by the Trust include:

- Ashbridge Estate
- Barnum House
- Birkbeck Building
- Canada Southern Railway Station
- Duff Baby House
- Elgin and Winter Garden Theatres
- Enoch Turner School
- Fulford Place
- George Brown House
- Josiah Henson Museum
- Niagara Apothecary
- Museum of Northern History
- Wolford Chapel (in Devon, England)
