= Ted Hsu =

Canadian politician (born 1964)

Ted Hsu MPP
- 徐正陶
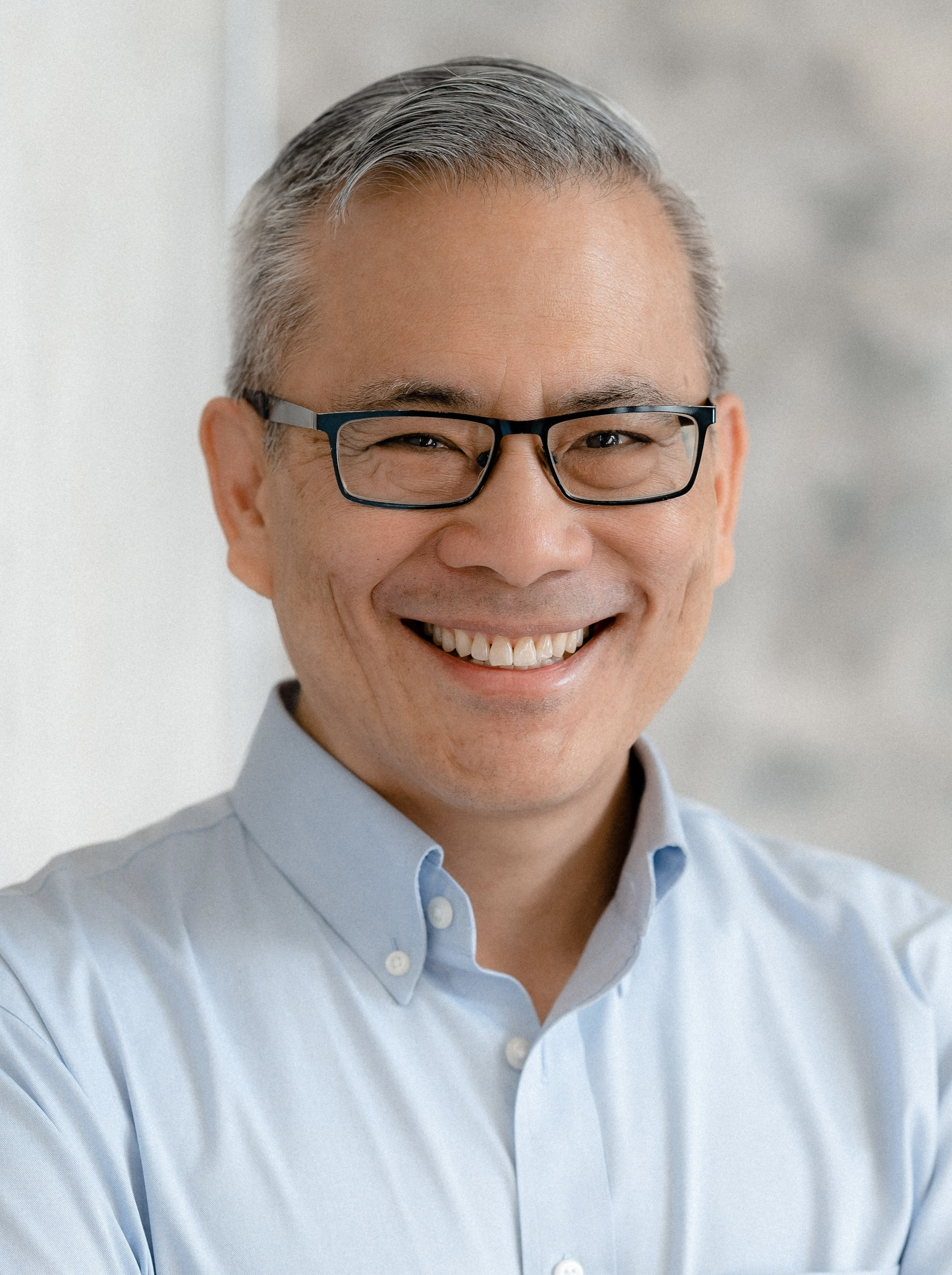
- Hsu in 2023

Member of the Ontario Provincial Parliament for Kingston and the Islands
- Incumbent
- Assumed office June 2, 2022
- Preceded by: Ian Arthur

Member of Parliament for Kingston and the Islands
- In office May 2, 2011 – August 4, 2015
- Preceded by: Peter Milliken
- Succeeded by: Mark Gerretsen

Personal details
- Born: Theodore Hsu; March 4, 1964 (age 62) Bartlesville, Oklahoma, U.S.
- Party: Ontario Liberal
- Other political affiliations: Liberal (federal)
- Spouse: Tara Sharkey
- Education: Queen's University (BSc); Princeton University (PhD)
- Website: Constituency website

Theodore Hsu MPP (pronounced "shoe": Chinese: 徐正陶; born March 4, 1964) is a Canadian physicist and politician who has represented Kingston and the Islands in the Legislative Assembly of Ontario since 2022 as a member of the Ontario Liberal Party. Before entering provincial politics, Hsu served as a Member of Parliament (MP) representing Kingston and the Islands federally from the 2011 to 2015 as a member of the Liberal Party of Canada. On May 28, 2023, Hsu announced his candidacy for the 2023 Ontario Liberal Party Leadership Election in which he was eliminated on the first ballot.

== Early life and career ==
Hsu was born in Bartlesville, Oklahoma, in 1964 to James and Marjorie and is the oldest of three siblings. Hsu is of Chinese descent and is fluent in English, French, and Mandarin. When he was six months old, the family moved to Kingston, Ontario, where his father joined Queen's University as a chemical engineering professor.

Hsu attended high school at Kingston's Loyalist Collegiate and Vocational Institute. In 1984, he graduated from Queen's University with a Bachelor of Science Honours in physics. He pursued graduate studies at Princeton University, where he completed his PhD in physics in 1989 after successfully defending his dissertation titled "Towards an understanding of the large U-Hubbard model and a theory for high temperature superconductors," under the supervision of Philip W. Anderson, recipient of the 1977 Nobel Prize in Physics. Hsu went on to complete post-doctoral research in Chalk River, Vancouver, and France.

Applying his technical and research skills in math, computing, and problem-solving to capital markets, Hsu worked as a researcher and trader in Paris and Philadelphia for Banque Nationale de Paris, and as an executive director in the Tokyo office of Morgan Stanley.

Hsu is a long-term member of SWITCH, a Kingston-based not-for-profit association that promotes local job creation and green economic growth. From 2007 to 2011, he served as the executive director of SWITCH and compiled the first Greenhouse Gas Inventory for Kingston.

== Politics ==
Hsu acted as treasurer of the Kingston and the Islands Federal Liberal Association from 2007 to 2010, and was an active member of its policy committee. During this time, he supported the 2007 provincial and 2008 federal Liberal campaigns for John Gerretsen and Peter Milliken, the longest-serving Speaker in the House of Commons. Following Milliken's announcement in summer 2010 that he would not seek re-election, Hsu won the Liberal nomination in November to be the party's 2011 candidate.

=== In Parliament ===
In the federal election held on May 2, 2011, Hsu defeated Conservative candidate Alicia Gordon by less than 3,000 votes. He was one of only two new Liberal MPs elected in Canada in what was the party's poorest showing in history.

One of only a few MPs with an academic science background, Hsu served in the Liberal Party shadow cabinet as the critic for science and technology. He also would serve as critic for the Federal Economic Development Agency for Southern Ontario and critic for the Federal Economic Development Initiative for Northern Ontario. In August, 2013, Liberal leader Justin Trudeau appointed Hsu to an additional role as Liberal critic for post-secondary education.

In 2011, Hsu was the first runner-up to Conservative MP Chris Alexander as Rookie of the Year, in Maclean's annual Parliamentarians of the Year awards. Hsu was also the first runner-up for the Rising Star award for Maclean's in 2012 and the annual accolades continued in November 2013, with Hsu winning the Maclean's Parliamentarian of the Year Award. He was voted by parliamentarians from all parties as the MP who "Best Represents Constituents."

In August 2014, Hsu announced that he would not run for re-election in the upcoming 2015 federal election, citing the burdens of political life on his young family.

Before leaving federal politics, he introduced a noteworthy private member's bill in September 2014. "Bill C-626, An Act to Amend the Statistics Act" was designed to appoint a chief statistician and to reinstate the long-form census, which had been eliminated by the Conservative Party in 2010. Ultimately, the long-form census was restored in 2015, immediately after the new Liberal government took office, but after Hsu had left (see Canada 2011 Census.). Hsu also spent much of his time advocating for the return of the Canadian Prison Farm System which was re-instated, albeit in a more limited format, in 2019.

=== Post-Parliament ===
Upon leaving the House of Commons, Hsu served as the campaign manager for Liberal MPP Sophie Kiwala during the 2018 provincial election in Ontario and, in 2019, during the Canadian federal election Hsu also managed the successful re-election campaign of Mark Gerretsen, the Liberal MP who replaced him.

In 2017, Hsu joined SYNG pharmaceuticals, a Kingston-based biotechnology startup focusing on diagnosing and treating endometriosis. As an advisor for SYNG, Hsu provided communications support.

From 2019 to 2020, Hsu was asked to co-chair the Mayor's Task Force on Housing, which culminated in a report and a series of recommendations to address Kingston's challenging housing shortage.

=== Return to politics and Ontario Liberal leadership campaign ===
In 2020, Hsu announced his campaign to represent Kingston and the Islands as the Ontario Liberal Party candidate in the upcoming provincial election. He won the bid over previous MPP Sophie Kiwala, who lost in the 2018 Ontario election, in November 2020.

When asked about his motivations for re-entering politics, Hsu said, "As my kids and their young friends have grown up and become aware of their world, they tell me how worried they are." He went on to say, "I want to offer voters someone who has a proven record representing constituents, and also has experience working with scientists, climate researchers, economists, engineers and entrepreneurs." He was elected in the 2022 Ontario general election.

He has held the Ontario Liberal Party critic roles for the Ministry of Energy, Ministry of Natural Resources and Forestry, Ministry of Mines, and the Ministry of Citizenship and Multiculturalism. As of February 28, 2024, he serves as the Liberal Party critic for Energy and Mines, Natural Resources and Forestry, and Agricultural and Rural Issues.

Hsu was a candidate in the 2023 Ontario Liberal Party leadership election but was eliminated on the first ballot when he placed fourth with 10% of the vote behind Mississauga mayor Bonnie Crombie, who would win on the third ballot, runner-up Nathaniel Erskine-Smith, and third-place finisher Yasir Naqvi.

He was handily re-elected to a second term in his riding in the 2025 Ontario Provincial Election, receiving more than 61% of the total vote, an increase of 24% compared to 2022. Hsu's margin of victory by votes was the largest in Ontario and the largest ever in his provincial riding's history. It was also the best result for the Ontario Liberals in the 2025 election.

== Electoral record ==
=== Federal ===
2011 federal election: Kingston and the Islands
Party	Candidate	Votes	%	±%
Liberal	Ted Hsu	23,842	39.31%	+0.6%
Conservative	Alicia Gordon	21,189	34.93%	+2.4%
New Democratic	Daniel Beals	13,065	21.54%	+4.1%
Green	Eric Walton	2,561	4.22%	-6.6%
Total valid votes/expense limit		60,657	100.0%	n/a
Total rejected ballots		219		
Turnout		60,876	63.6%	

Source: 2Z3 Elections Canada

=== Provincial ===
2022 Ontario general election: Kingston and the Islands
Party	Candidate	Votes	%	±%	Expenditures
Liberal	Ted Hsu	18,360	37.66	+10.14	$75,749
New Democratic	Mary Rita Holland	15,186	31.15	–8.00	$130,691
Progressive Conservative	Gary Bennett	11,973	24.56	–1.52	$62,419
Green	Zachary Typhair	1,601	3.28	–3.14	$15,397
Ontario Party	Shalea Beckwith	827	1.70	–	$7,396
New Blue	Stephen Skyvington	429	0.88	–	$7,078
Independent	Shelley Joanne Galloway	130	0.27	–	$0
Communist	Sebastian Vaillancourt	123	0.25	–	$0
Consensus Ontario	Laurel Claus Johnson	120	0.25	–	$0
Total valid votes/expense limit		48,749	99.49		$146,496
Total rejected, unmarked and declined ballots		249	0.51	–0.40	
Turnout		48,998	46.84	–10.45	
Eligible voters		104,601			
Liberal gain from New Democratic		Swing		▲9.07	
Source: Elections Ontario

2025 Ontario general election: Kingston and the Islands
Party	Candidate	Votes	%	±%	Expenditures
Liberal	Ted Hsu	33,288	61.57	+23.91	$72,496
Progressive Conservative	Ian Chapelle	12,022	22.24	–2.32	$50,937
New Democratic	Elliot Goodell Ugalde	6,663	12.32	–18.83	$39,682
Green	Zachary Typhair	1,195	2.21	–1.07	$7,532
Ontario Party	Allan Wilson	565	1.05	–0.65	$0
None of the Above	James McNair	331	0.61	–	$0
Total valid votes/expense limit		54,064	99.24	–	$176,327
Total rejected, unmarked and declined ballots		412	0.76	+0.25	
Turnout		54,476	49.74	+2.90	
Eligible voters		109,520			
Liberal hold		Swing		+13.12	
Source: Elections Ontario
