= London West (provincial electoral district) =

Provincial electoral district in Ontario, Canada

Coordinates: 43.0°N 81.4°W

Ontario electoral district
- Location in London

Provincial electoral district
- Legislature: Legislative Assembly of Ontario
MPP
Peggy Sattler
New Democratic
- District created: 1996
- First contested: 1999
- Last contested: 2025

Demographics
- Population (2016): 126,110
- Electors (2018): 98,749
- Area (km²): 78
- Pop. density (per km²): 1,616.8
- Census division: Middlesex
- Census subdivision: London

London West is a provincial electoral district in Ontario, Canada, that has been represented in the Legislative Assembly of Ontario since 1999.

== Geography ==
The district includes the northwest part of the City of London.

In 2005, it was defined to consist of the part of the city lying north and west of a line drawn from the western limit of the city along Dingman Creek, Southdale Road West, Wharncliffe Road South, Commissioners Road East, the Canadian National Railway, the Thames River, Wharncliffe Road North, Oxford Street West and Wonderland Road North.

== History ==
The provincial electoral district was created in 1996 from parts of London South, London North and London Centre, when provincial ridings were defined to have the same borders as federal ridings. It initially consisted of the part of the city lying north and west of a line drawn from the western limit of the city along Dingman Creek, Southdale Road West, Wharncliffe Road South, Commissioners Road East, the London and Port Stanley Electric Railway, the Thames River, Wharncliffe Road, Oxford Street, Wonderland Road North and Hutton Road.

In 2005, it was given its current boundaries as described above.

The long-time MPP Chris Bentley resigned his seat in the legislature effective on February 14, 2013. He was replaced by Peggy Sattler in the August 1st by-election. Sattler was subsequently re-elected in 2018 and 2022.

== Members of Provincial Parliament ==
This riding has elected the following members of the Legislative Assembly of Ontario:

London West
| Assembly | Years | Member | Party |
|---|---|---|---|
Riding created from London South, London North, and London Centre
| 37th | 1999–2003 | Bob Wood | Progressive Conservative |
| 38th | 2003–2007 | Christopher Bentley | Liberal |
| 39th | 2007–2011 | Christopher Bentley | Liberal |
| 40th | 2011–2013 | Christopher Bentley | Liberal |
| 40th | 2013–2014 | Peggy Sattler | New Democratic |
| 41st | 2014–2018 | Peggy Sattler | New Democratic |
| 42nd | 2018–2022 | Peggy Sattler | New Democratic |
| 43rd | 2022–2025 | Peggy Sattler | New Democratic |
| 44th | 2025–present | Peggy Sattler | New Democratic |

== Election results ==
=== General elections (2014–present) ===
Winning party in each polling division of London West at the 2025 Ontario general election

2025 Ontario general election
| Party | Candidate | Votes | % | ±% | Expenditures |
|---|---|---|---|---|---|
| New Democratic | Peggy Sattler | 26,589 | 49.21 | +4.08 | $108,761 |
| Progressive Conservative | Beth Allison | 18,892 | 34.96 | +1.11 | $97,451 |
| Liberal | Baqar Khan | 5,991 | 11.09 | –1.10 | $30,023 |
| Green | Jim Johnston | 1,021 | 1.89 | –1.54 | $536 |
| New Blue | Shane Dale | 636 | 1.18 | –1.38 | $0 |
| Libertarian | Ken Byma | 572 | 1.06 | +0.19 | $0 |
| Freedom | Tim Hodges | 179 | 0.33 | –0.06 | $0 |
| Independent | Timothy Hammer | 153 | 0.28 | – | $0 |
| Total valid votes/expense limit | | 54,033 | 99.54 | – | $174,901 |
| Total rejected, unmarked and declined ballots | | 252 | 0.46 | –0.05 | |
| Turnout | | 54,285 | 49.97 | +1.35 | |
| Eligible voters | | 108,634 | | | |
| New Democratic hold | | Swing | | +1.49 | |
Source: Elections Ontario

Winning party in each polling division of London West at the 2022 Ontario general election

2022 Ontario general election
| Party | Candidate | Votes | % | ±% | Expenditures |
|---|---|---|---|---|---|
| New Democratic | Peggy Sattler | 22,510 | 45.13 | –10.21 | $126,499 |
| Progressive Conservative | Paul Paolatto | 16,886 | 33.85 | +4.81 | $92,003 |
| Liberal | Vanessa Lalonde | 6,077 | 12.18 | +2.27 | $27,325 |
| Green | Colleen McCauley | 1,713 | 3.43 | –0.31 | $2,016 |
| New Blue | Kristopher Hunt | 1,277 | 2.56 | – | $5,424 |
| Ontario Party | Cynthia Workman | 521 | 1.04 | – | $2,767 |
| Libertarian | Jacques Y. Boudreau | 434 | 0.87 | –0.07 | $0 |
| Consensus Ontario | Brad Harness | 267 | 0.54 | +0.02 | $0 |
| Freedom | Mike McMullen | 197 | 0.39 | +0.04 | $0 |
| Total valid votes/expense limit | | 49,882 | 99.49 | – | $144,777 |
| Total rejected, unmarked and declined ballots | | 257 | 0.51 | –0.83 | |
| Turnout | | 50,139 | 48.62 | –11.94 | |
| Eligible voters | | 103,127 | | | |
| New Democratic hold | | Swing | | –7.51 | |
Source: Elections Ontario

2018 Ontario general election
| Party | Candidate | Votes | % | ±% |
|---|---|---|---|---|
| New Democratic | Peggy Sattler | 32,644 | 55.33 | +14.97 |
| Progressive Conservative | Andrew Lawton | 17,133 | 29.04 | –0.53 |
| Liberal | Jonathan Hughes | 5,847 | 9.91 | –13.81 |
| Green | Pamela Reid | 2,211 | 3.75 | –0.44 |
| Libertarian | Jacques Boudreau | 552 | 0.94 | – |
| Consensus Ontario | Brad Harness | 304 | 0.52 | – |
| Freedom | Tracey Pringle | 209 | 0.35 | –1.80 |
| Communist | Michael Lewis | 96 | 0.16 | – |
| Total valid votes | | 58,996 | 98.65 | |
| Total rejected, unmarked and declined ballots | | 805 | 1.35 | +0.21 |
| Turnout | | 59,801 | 60.56 | +4.52 |
| Eligible voters | | 98,749 | | |
| New Democratic hold | | Swing | | +7.75 |
Source: Elections Ontario

2014 Ontario general election
| Party | Candidate | Votes | % | ±% |
|---|---|---|---|---|
| New Democratic | Peggy Sattler | 22,243 | 40.36 | –1.32 |
| Progressive Conservative | Jeff Bennett | 16,295 | 29.57 | –3.41 |
| Liberal | Nick Steinburg | 13,070 | 23.72 | +7.89 |
| Green | Keith McAlister | 2,310 | 4.19 | –0.08 |
| Freedom | Al Gretzky | 1,188 | 2.16 | –2.77 |
| Total valid votes | | 55,106 | 98.86 | |
| Total rejected, unmarked and declined ballots | | 633 | 1.14 | +0.40 |
| Turnout | | 55,739 | 56.03 | +16.87 |
| Eligible voters | | 99,472 | | |
| New Democratic hold | | Swing | | +1.05 |
Source: Elections Ontario

=== 2013 by-election ===
The 2013 by-election in London West was called when Chris Bentley resigned his seat in the wake of the scandal regarding the cancellation of the gas plants in the 2011 election.

Ontario provincial by-election, August 1, 2013 Resignation of Chris Bentley
| Party | Candidate | Votes | % | ±% |
|---|---|---|---|---|
| New Democratic | Peggy Sattler | 15,704 | 41.68 | +19.96 |
| Progressive Conservative | Ali Chahbar | 12,426 | 32.98 | +3.50 |
| Liberal | Ken Coran | 5,965 | 15.83 | –29.82 |
| Freedom | Al Gretzky | 1,856 | 4.93 | +4.32 |
| Green | Gary Brown | 1,608 | 4.27 | +1.86 |
| Libertarian | Geoffrey Serbee | 117 | 0.31 | – |
| Total valid votes | | 37,676 | 99.26 | |
| Total rejected, unmarked and declined ballots | | 279 | 0.74 | +0.28 |
| Turnout | | 37,955 | 39.17 | –13.84 |
| Eligible voters | | 96,905 | | |
| New Democratic gain from Liberal | | Swing | | +8.23 |
Source: Elections Ontario

=== General elections (1999–2011) ===
2011 Ontario general election
| Party | Candidate | Votes | % | ±% |
|---|---|---|---|---|
| Liberal | Chris Bentley | 22,610 | 45.65 | –6.77 |
| Progressive Conservative | Ali Chahbar | 14,603 | 29.49 | +5.24 |
| New Democratic | Jeff Buchanan | 10,757 | 21.72 | +10.49 |
| Green | Gary Brown | 1,194 | 2.41 | –8.06 |
| Freedom | Tim Hodges | 300 | 0.61 | +0.13 |
| Republican | Chris Gupta | 61 | 0.12 | –0.09 |
| Total valid votes | | 49,525 | 99.55 | |
| Total rejected, unmarked and declined ballots | | 224 | 0.45 | –0.26 |
| Turnout | | 49,749 | 53.01 | –4.82 |
| Eligible voters | | 93,852 | | |
| Liberal hold | | Swing | | –6.00 |
Source: Elections Ontario

2007 Ontario general election
| Party | Candidate | Votes | % | ±% |
|---|---|---|---|---|
| Liberal | Chris Bentley | 25,967 | 52.42 | +0.97 |
| Progressive Conservative | Allison Graham | 12,011 | 24.25 | –6.86 |
| New Democratic | Paul Pighin | 5,562 | 11.23 | –3.66 |
| Green | Gary Brown | 5,184 | 10.47 | +8.85 |
| Family Coalition | Andrew J. Jezierski | 267 | 0.54 | – |
| Freedom | Paul McKeever | 234 | 0.47 | –0.45 |
| Independent | Mike Reynolds | 201 | 0.41 | – |
| Republican | Chris Gupta | 106 | 0.21 | – |
| Total valid votes | | 49,532 | 99.29 | |
| Total rejected, unmarked and declined ballots | | 356 | 0.71 | +0.11 |
| Turnout | | 49,888 | 57.83 | –2.19 |
| Eligible voters | | 86,266 | | |
| Liberal hold | | Swing | | +3.91 |
Source: Elections Ontario

2003 Ontario general election
| Party | Candidate | Votes | % | ±% |
|---|---|---|---|---|
| Liberal | Chris Bentley | 25,581 | 51.46 | +7.12 |
| Progressive Conservative | Bob Wood | 15,463 | 31.11 | –13.82 |
| New Democratic | Patti Dalton | 7,403 | 14.89 | +5.76 |
| Green | Laura Wythe | 805 | 1.62 | +1.01 |
| Freedom | Bill Frampton | 460 | 0.93 | +0.46 |
| Total valid votes | | 49,712 | 99.40 | |
| Total rejected, unmarked and declined ballots | | 300 | 0.60 | –0.11 |
| Turnout | | 50,012 | 60.02 | –2.61 |
| Eligible voters | | 83,326 | | |
| Liberal gain from Progressive Conservative | | Swing | | +10.47 |
Source: Elections Ontario

1999 Ontario general election
| Party | Candidate | Votes | % |
|---|---|---|---|
| Progressive Conservative | Bob Wood | 22,761 | 44.92 |
| Liberal | Darrel Skidmore | 22,467 | 44.34 |
| New Democratic | Sandra McNee | 4,628 | 9.13 |
| Green | Jeremy Price | 308 | 0.61 |
| Freedom | Jack Plant | 236 | 0.47 |
| Natural Law | Ernie Merkley | 133 | 0.26 |
| Libertarian | Gayle Remisch | 133 | 0.26 |
| Total valid votes | | 50,666 | 99.29 |
| Total rejected, unmarked and declined ballots | | 360 | 0.71 |
| Turnout | | 51,026 | 62.63 |
| Eligible voters | | 81,467 | |
| Progressive Conservative pickup new district. | | | |
Source: Elections Ontario

== 2007 electoral reform referendum ==
2007 Ontario electoral reform referendum
| Side | Votes | |
|---|---|---|
| First Past the Post | 30,585 | 63.7 |
| Mixed member proportional | 17,421 | 36.3 |
| Total valid votes | 48,006 | 100.0 |

== See also ==
- List of Ontario provincial electoral districts
- Canadian provincial electoral districts
