= Kingston and the Islands =

Kingston and the Islands could refer to:

- Kingston and the Islands (federal electoral district)
- Kingston and the Islands (provincial electoral district)
