= Ian Arthur =

Canadian politician

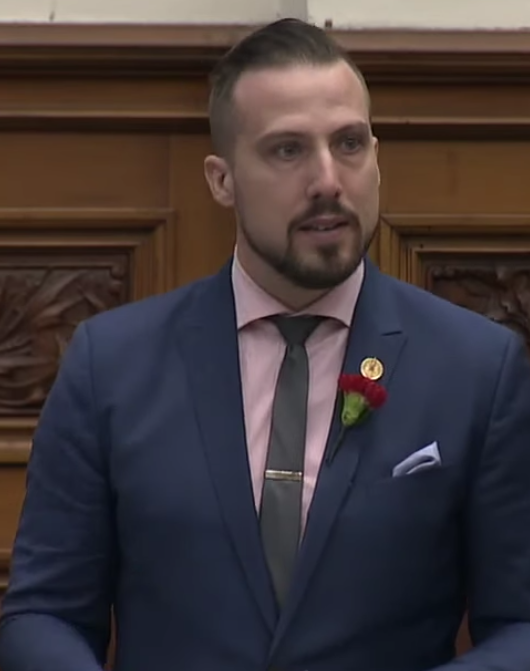

Critic, Environment and Sustainability
- In office August 23, 2018 – February 1, 2021
- Leader: Andrea Horwath

Member of the Ontario Provincial Parliament for Kingston and the Islands
- In office June 7, 2018 – May 3, 2022
- Preceded by: Sophie Kiwala
- Succeeded by: Ted Hsu

Personal details
- Born: December 20, 1984 (age 41)
- Party: New Democratic
- Education: Trent University
- Occupation: Executive Chef

Ian J. Arthur (born December 20, 1984) is a former Canadian politician, first elected to the Legislative Assembly of Ontario in the 2018 provincial election. He represented the riding of Kingston and the Islands as a member of the Ontario New Democratic Party. He was officially sworn in as the Member of Provincial Parliament on July 10, 2018. As a member of the Official Opposition, Arthur currently served on the Finance and Economic Affairs committee of the Legislative Assembly. He also served as the Official Opposition Critic for the Environment until February 1, 2021, when he was appointed the Critic for Small Business Recovery and Reopening Main Street. In December 2021, Arthur announced he would not be seeking re-election in the 2022 Ontario provincial election.

Prior to being elected, he was the executive chef at well-known Kingston restaurant Chez Piggy and coached rowing for Queen's University.

== Background ==
Arthur was born in Corner Brook, Newfoundland, on December 20, 1984. Moving with his parents at age two to Lyndhurst, Ontario, Arthur grew up on a small organic market garden and farm. He attended Sydenham High School before studying International Development and Political Studies at Trent University. While completing his undergraduate degree, Arthur studied abroad at the University of Ghana in Accra, Ghana and interned with the Canadian High Commissioner to Ghana. Arthur was the former head chef of the Chez Piggy restaurant in Kingston. Arthur is a former member of the Kingston, Frontenac, Lennox, and Addington Food Policy Council. He is a member of the Kingston Action Group for a Basic Income Guarantee and sits on the board of directors for Switch Kingston, a Kingston-based not-for-profit association that promotes job creation and investment in sustainable energy.

== Provincial politics ==
Arthur secured the Ontario NDP nomination on March 1, 2018. He defeated Georgina Riel and Rob Matheson in the first round of voting to secure the nomination. In the 2018 Ontario general election, Arthur was elected in Kingston and the Islands, defeating Ontario Liberal candidate Sophie Kiwala by 6,385 votes. This is the first time Kingston and the Islands elected a New Democrat since Gary Wilson won the riding in the 1990 Ontario general election.

After being elected, Arthur was appointed as Official Critic for Environment and Sustainability. As an advocate for fighting climate change, Arthur highlighted in his speeches in Legislature numerous environmental and ecological issues with several Progressive Conservative bills. He was named to the Standing Committee on Finance and Economic Affairs. In 2019 Arthur was appointed to the Executive of the Council of State Governments Eastern Regional Conference by Speaker Ted Arnot.

On December 14, 2021, Arthur announced he would not seek re-election in the 2022 Ontario general election. The riding returned to the Liberals when former MP Ted Hsu defeated the NDP nominee who preceded Arthur in 2011 and 2014, Mary Rita Holland, in the election.

== Electoral record ==
2018 Ontario general election: Kingston and the Islands
Party	Candidate	Votes	%	±%
New Democratic	Ian Arthur	21,788	39.16	+9.73
Liberal	Sophie Kiwala	15,312	27.52	−14.54
Progressive Conservative	Gary Bennett	14,512	26.08	+5.28
Green	Robert Kiley	3,574	6.42	−0.81
Libertarian	Heather Cunningham	274	0.49	
Trillium	Andre Imbeault	184	0.33	
Total valid votes		55,644	99.09	
Total rejected, unmarked and declined ballots		510	0.91	
Turnout		56,154	57.29	
Eligible voters		98,020		
New Democratic gain from Liberal		Swing		+12.14
Source: Elections Ontario
