= Dutton, Ontario =

Dutton
- Unincorporated community
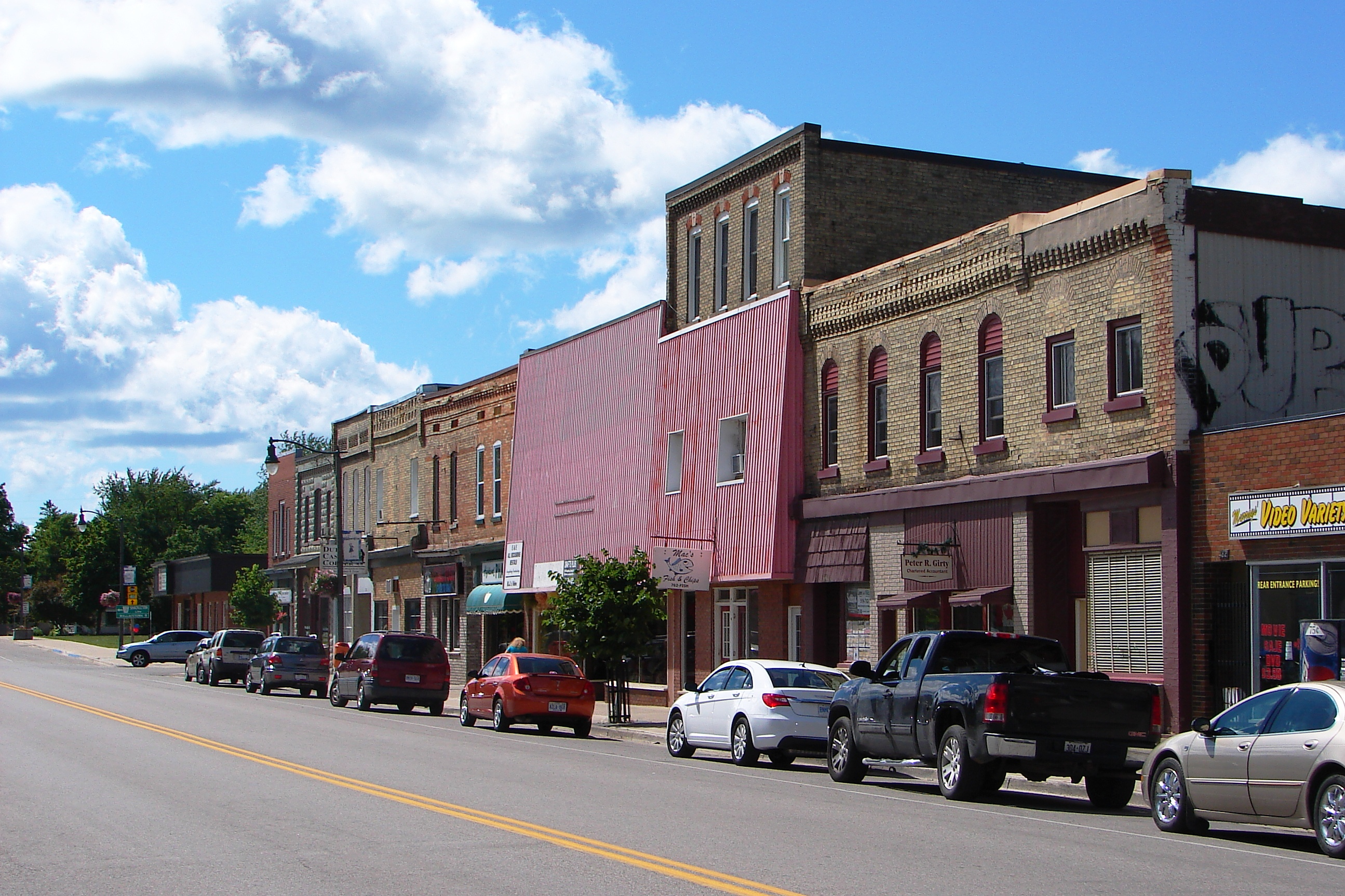

- Location within Ontario
- Coordinates: 42°39′50″N 81°30′05″W
- Country: Canada
- Province: Ontario
- County: Elgin
- Municipality: Dutton/Dunwich
- Amalgamated: 1998

Government
  - Mayor: Robert Purcell
  - Federal riding: Elgin—St. Thomas—London South
  - Prov. riding: Elgin—Middlesex—London
- Time zone: UTC-5 (EST)
  - Summer (DST): UTC-4 (EDT)
- Postal Code: N0L
- Area codes: 519 and 226

Dutton is a community in the Township of Dutton/Dunwich, Elgin County, Ontario, Canada. Dutton is located 30 kilometres (19 mi) southwest of St. Thomas.

Originally part of Dunwich Township, Dutton was originally called Bennettville, then Lisgar. When the Canada Southern Railway was built in 1872, the station was named Dutton Station after the railway's chief engineer. It was shortened to Dutton in 1881 and incorporated as a separate municipality a few years later.

On January 2, 1998, as part of county-wide municipal restructuring, the Village of Dutton was reamalgamated with Dunwich to form Dutton/Dunwich.
