= Andrew Lawton (politician) =

Canadian politician

Andrew Lawton MP

Member of Parliament for Elgin—St. Thomas—London South
- Incumbent
- Assumed office April 28, 2025
- Preceded by: riding established

Personal details
- Born: October 14, 1989 (age 37) Trenton, Ontario, Canada
- Party: Conservative
- Spouse: Jennifer Bieman
- Education: University of Western Ontario

Andrew Lawton (born October 14, 1989) MP is a Canadian politician, author, and journalist from the Conservative Party of Canada. He was elected Member of Parliament for Elgin—St. Thomas—London South in the 2025 Canadian federal election.

He was previously a journalist and broadcaster with conservative outlets such as True North and Rebel Media, a London-based radio host on CFPL (AM), and the author of a book on the Freedom Convoy protest and a biography of Conservative leader Pierre Poilievre. Lawton also previously unsuccessfully ran in London West for the Progressive Conservative Party of Ontario in the 2018 Ontario general election.

== Early life and career ==
Andrew Lawton was born in Trenton, Ontario, on October 14, 1989, and was raised in London, Ontario. He attended both London Central Secondary School and Saunders Secondary School. Lawton has a political science degree from the University of Western Ontario and previously worked for Wilfrid Laurier University as a journalism instructor.

According to Lawton, he suffered with mental illness from 2005 to 2013 and attempted to die by suicide in 2010. In 2010, Lawton was described in the Ottawa Sun as a political organizer trying to start a Canadian Tea Party movement. Between 2010 and 2012, Lawton ran a podcast called Strictly Right, which aired 200 episodes, whose guests included Ben Shapiro and Ann Coulter, for whom he helped arrange a speech at the University of Western Ontario in March 2010.

In 2013, Lawton began hosting a right-wing, London-based radio show on 980 CFPL (AM). In 2015, Lawton was suspended from that position for a Facebook post criticizing a local organization raising homophobia concerns by suggesting that gay Canadians were "the real enemy" because the transmission of HIV/AIDS in Canada as a result of sexual practices between men was higher than the number of sexual orientation-based hate crimes.

From 2015 to 2017, Lawton hosted a podcast for Rebel Media called Lawton Online. He has also filled in for Danielle Smith on her radio show as well as on The Roy Green Show. Lawton has also worked as a personality for the Canada Strong and Free Network.

Lawton was let go from his AM radio show in 2018 a few weeks before he became a candidate in the 2018 Ontario general election in April.

== Provincial politics ==
On April 11, 2018, Lawton announced that he was entering the Progressive Conservative Party candidate nomination race for London West for the 2018 Ontario general election. On April 21, he was directly appointed as the party's candidate by Doug Ford, bypassing the race. During the campaign, he released a statement on May 7 about his previous inflammatory social media posts about race, women, the LGBTQ+ community, Islam, Christianity, deaf people, and people with mental illness that had resurfaced. He said that he had a period of mental illness from 2005 and 2013 that included a suicide attempt in 2010 before starting to see a psychiatrist in 2011. He described his behaviour then, including his use of social media as "reckless" and the posts themselves as "so far removed from who I am and what I stand for that I can't even fathom my frame of mind in writing them." Lawton also asked for "compassion and trust" from voters.

Later in the campaign, on May 16 and a day before nominations closed, the Ontario Liberal Party called on Ford to remove Lawton as a candidate, citing statements made on Rebel Media after the period in his initial statement, including a call for a ban on Islam. Ford called the attack "rich" citing the proximity to the closure of nominations, the previous statement, and defended Lawton as a "good candidate" that both Liberal Ontario premier Kathleen Wynne and campaign co-chair Deb Matthews had been willing to join as guests on his shows. On May 23, PressProgress published a story about Lawton's comments on his Rebel Media show in March 2016 in which he argued for legalizing racial and gender discrimination in employment. On June 7, he was defeated by NDP incumbent Peggy Sattler.

== Return to broadcasting ==
Lawton served as the managing editor of True North, where he hosted the namesake The Andrew Lawton Show.

During the 2022 Public Order Emergency Commission inquiry into the Freedom Convoy protest earlier that year, Lawton was part of a Signal group chat used by convoy leaders and lawyers to coordinate social media messaging with right wing alternative media personalities from True North, Western Standard, and Rebel Media and far-right influencers including self-identified white nationalists and associates of Diagolon. Lawton was one of the most active participants and multiple tweets of his during the inquiry, such as specific video clips to share, were derived from brainstorming with others in the chat. When asked about his role during the 2025 federal election, Lawton issued a statement characterizing his presence in the chat as a journalistic effort to reach sources and spread his work.

In June 2022, Lawton published his first book, The Freedom Convoy: The Inside Story of Three Weeks that Shook the World, with Sutherland House Books. Lawton, who reported on the convoy for True North, used multiple exclusive interviews with convoy leaders and participants and advertised his book as one that would "tell the whole story" of the protest. In mid-July, it topped the Toronto Star's weekly bestseller list for Canadian non-fiction books and The Globe and Mail's weekly bestseller list for Canadian hardcover non-fiction. Indigo Books and Music declined to physically stock the book in stores, though did offer it for sale online.

In May 2024, he published his second book, Pierre Poilievre: A Political Life, a biography of the Conservative Party leader also with Sutherland House. A review in The Globe and Mail by John Ibbitson praised the work as helpful for introducing readers to Poilievre but criticized it for a surface-level analysis that ignored details that did not align with a Conservative worldview. A review by Jeffrey Simpson in the Literary Review of Canada described it as "well-researched" and "generous-to-a-fault".

== Federal politics ==
In July 2024, Lawton announced that he would seek the Conservative nomination in Elgin—St. Thomas—London South for the 2025 federal election after Conservative MP Karen Vecchio announced that she would not seek reelection in the new riding. Lawton took a leave of absence from True North to campaign and won the nomination in November, defeating a competitor endorsed by Vecchio. Vecchio later declined to endorse him, citing a desire for local voters to decide, his lack of ties to the riding, and how she was from the centrist wing while Lawton was from the right-leaning wing.

During the campaign, his role in the Freedom Convoy group chat during the Public Order Emergency Commission inquiry was reported on and his past comments that hurt his 2018 provincial campaign resurfaced. The comments lead a local anti-Islamophobia group to call for his removal as Conservative candidate. Lawton defended the former as journalistic and the latter as "deeply hurtful" and again blamed his mental illness at the time. On April 12, a 200-person protest calling itself the "Stand Up for Decency Rally" was held in front of his campaign office in St. Thomas. Lawton defeated Liberal candidate David Goodwin during the federal election on April 28.

== Personal life ==
Lawton is married to London Free Press reporter Jennifer Bieman. While Lawton did not live in his St. Thomas riding, he says that he has lived in London his entire life, and pledged to move to the riding after his 2025 electoral win.

In 2014 Lawton was charged with trespassing at an abandoned farmhouse south near St. Thomas, Ontario. Lawton said he was taking photographs during his "artistic amateur photographer streak" and was given a ticket for $70.

In July 2025, a historic building in St. Thomas that housed Lawton’s campaign office was destroyed in an arson attack. The suspect charged in the attack had previously been convicted on 14 charges. Lawton says the incident inspired him to pursue bail reform for repeat offenders.

In November 2025, during a meeting of the Standing Committee on Justice and Human Rights, Lawton claimed he was the victim of sexual abuse as a child, and urged the Liberal government and Justice Minister Sean Fraser to use the notwithstanding clause of the Canadian Charter of Rights and Freedoms to reintroduce mandatory minimum sentences for possession of child sexual exploitation and abuse material.

== Publications ==
- Lawton, Andrew (June 24, 2022). The Freedom Convoy: The Inside Story of Three Weeks that Shook the World. Sutherland House Books. ISBN 978-1989555934.
- Lawton, Andrew (May 28, 2024). Pierre Poilievre: A Political Life. Sutherland House Books. ISBN 978-1990823800.

== Electoral record ==
2025 Canadian federal election: Elgin—St. Thomas—London South
| Party | Candidate | Votes | % | ±% | Expenditures |
|---|---|---|---|---|---|
| Conservative | Andrew Lawton | 32,565 | 50.14 | +0.89 | $127,637.08 |
| Liberal | David Goodwin | 28,010 | 43.13 | +23.48 | $131,543.21 |
| New Democratic | Paul Pighin | 3,118 | 4.80 | –11.36 | $3,136.78 |
| People's | Stephen Campbell | 1,256 | 1.93 | –10.25 | $4,200.00 |
| Total valid votes/expense limit | | 64,949 | 99.36 | – | $139,715.07 |
| Total rejected ballots | | 417 | 0.64 | | |
| Turnout | | 65,366 | 68.78 | | |
| Eligible voters | | 95,033 | | | |
| Conservative notional hold | | Swing | | –11.30 | |
Elections Canada

2018 Ontario general election: London West
| Party | Candidate | Votes | % | ±% |
|---|---|---|---|---|
| New Democratic | Peggy Sattler | 32,644 | 55.33 | +14.97 |
| Progressive Conservative | Andrew Lawton | 17,133 | 29.04 | –0.53 |
| Liberal | Jonathan Hughes | 5,847 | 9.91 | –13.81 |
| Green | Pamela Reid | 2,211 | 3.75 | –0.44 |
| Libertarian | Jacques Boudreau | 552 | 0.94 | – |
| Consensus Ontario | Brad Harness | 304 | 0.52 | – |
| Freedom | Tracey Pringle | 209 | 0.35 | –1.80 |
| Communist | Michael Lewis | 96 | 0.16 | – |
| Total valid votes | | 58,996 | 98.65 | |
| Total rejected, unmarked and declined ballots | | 805 | 1.35 | +0.21 |
| Turnout | | 59,801 | 60.56 | +4.52 |
| Eligible voters | | 98,749 | | |
| New Democratic hold | | Swing | | +7.75 |
Source: Elections Ontario
