= John White (Ontario politician) =

Canadian politician

Ontario MPP
- In office 1959–1975
- Preceded by: George Ernest Jackson
- Succeeded by: John Ferris
- Constituency: London South

Personal details
- Born: John Howard White; August 16, 1925 Chicago, Illinois
- Died: September 5, 1996 (aged 71) London, Ontario
- Party: Progressive Conservative
- Spouse: Beatrice Ivey
- Children: 2

Military service
- Allegiance: Canadian
- Branch/service: Navy
- Years of service: 1944-45
- Battles/wars: Battle of the Atlantic

John Howard White (August 16, 1925 – September 5, 1996) was a Progressive Conservative cabinet minister in Ontario, Canada, and Member of Provincial Parliament for London South from 1959 to 1975. He served as provincial treasurer from January 1973 to January 1975.

== Background ==
White was born in Chicago, Illinois in 1925 to Howard White and Margaret Johnson. He was educated at the University of Western Ontario earning a bachelor of arts, a business diploma and a master of arts in economics. After graduation he joined the Royal Canadian Navy in 1944 and served for two years during World War II. He worked for the Steel Company of Canada and he had owned small businesses in London, Ontario, the Canadian Industrial Supply Co Ltd, and, later, the Canada Financial Leasing Company. He was married to Beatrice Ivey and together they raised two daughters.

== Politics ==
In 1959, White was elected as the Progressive Conservative candidate in the riding of London South. He served as a backbench supporter in the Leslie Frost Government. He was re-elected in London South three more times before retiring before the 1975 election.

In May 1968 he was appointed chair of the Select Committee on the Report of the Ontario Committee on Taxation. The report that he tabled in September recommended a taxation plan that would have replaced the welfare system with a guaranteed annual income. In October 1968, he was appointed to Cabinet as the Minister of Revenue. As part of the first Davis cabinet he was named Minister of University Affairs in March 1971. After the 1971 election, his role in Cabinet was expanded and he served as Minister of Colleges and Universities (1971–1972), then, simultaneously, as Minister of Trade and Development and Minister of Tourism and Information (1971–1972), then those two Ministries were consolidated and he served as Minister of Industry and Tourism (1972–1973). His final role in Cabinet was as the provincial Treasurer (1973–1975). He served as a government MPP in Progressive Conservative governments under Premiers Leslie Frost, John Robarts and Bill Davis.

In those various Ministerial positions, White was responsible for a variety of initiatives and policies. In May 1968, Premier John Robarts assigned White the job of Chairman of the Select Committee on Taxation, an assignment to review the large of number of tax reform recommendations coming from Lancelot Smith’s Committee on Taxation. The Smith Committee was established in 1962 as a parallel study group to Progressive Conservative Prime Minister Diefenbaker’s Royal Commission on Taxation. Reporting in September 1968, it was during this period that White developed a reputation as a policy innovator predisposed to social engineering. White helped to introduce new policy instruments such as tax rebates and tax credits, which had been initiated by the Smith Committee and recommended by his special legislative committee on tax reform.

As Minister of Trade and Development then Minister of Industry and Tourism, White pressed his interest in small business by participating in the expansion of government services to small manufacturers. He also established twelve "exploratory policy groups" composed of private and public sector representatives, which he assigned to report on small business issues and the Ontario economy. Before White was able to act on their recommendations, in January 1973 Premier William Davis appointed him Treasurer.

As Treasurer, White promoted energy conservation, a controversial energy tax, and an assortment of "Red Tory" policies and programs.

As Chairman of Cabinet in 1975, White regularly turned back expansive government regulation-making of Ontario businesses by such Ministries as Consumer and Commercial Relations.

John White was a close confidant of Premier John Robarts and supported Bill Davis in his successful leadership bid to become Premier in 1971.

He retired from political life in 1975.

=== Cabinet posts ===
Davis ministry, Province of Ontario (1971–1985)
Cabinet posts (6)
Predecessor	Office	Successor
Darcy McKeough	Minister of Intergovernmental Affairs; 1973–1975; Also Minister of Economics	Darcy McKeough
Charles MacNaughton	Treasurer of Ontario; 1973–1975	Darcy McKeough
New position	Minister of Industry and Tourism; 1972–1973	Claude Bennett
Fernand Guindon	Minister of Tourism and Information; 1972 (February–April)	Self in new portfolio
Allan Grossman	Minister of Trade and Development; 1972 (February–April)	Self in new portfolio
Bill Davis	Minister of Colleges and Universities (Note: Was Minister of University Affairs from March 01, 1971 — October 28, 1971.); 1971–1972	George Kerr
Robarts ministry, Province of Ontario (1961–1971)
Cabinet post (1)
Predecessor	Office	Successor
Charles MacNaughton	Minister of Revenue; 1968–1971	Eric Winkler

== Later life ==
After leaving elected office, he was appointed as the President of the Ontario Heritage Foundation. He chaired the board of trustees of First Canadian Funds and AngloGibraltar Insurance Group. He was a founder of the Canadian Development Corp. He died in London, Ontario, aged 71.
