= Peggy Sattler =

Canadian politician

Peggy Sattler MPP
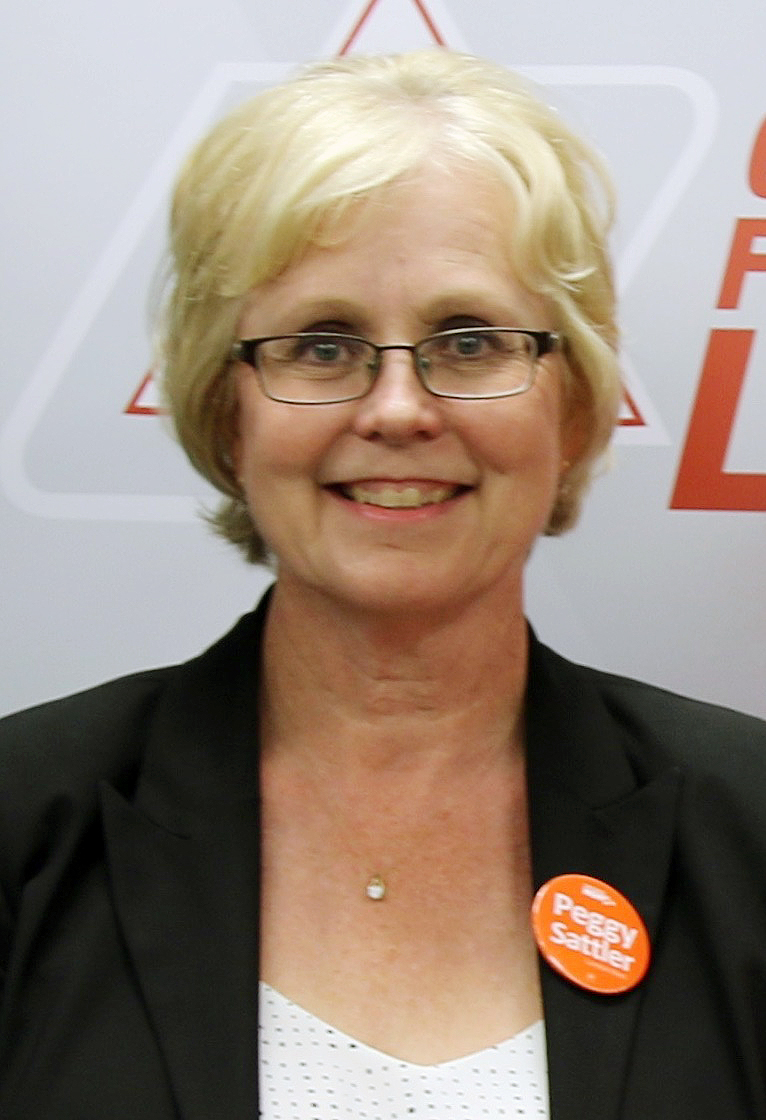
- Sattler in 2018

House Leader of the Ontario New Democratic Party
- In office February 1, 2021 – February 15, 2023
- Leader: Andrea Horwath; Peter Tabuns (interim); Marit Stiles

Critic, Democratic Reform
- In office February 1, 2021 – March 29, 2023
- Leader: Andrea Horwath; Peter Tabuns (interim); Marit Stiles

Critic, Labour
- In office February 1, 2021 – May 3, 2022
- Leader: Andrea Horwath

Critic, Economic Development
- In office August 23, 2018 – August 30, 2019
- Leader: Andrea Horwath

Critic, Training, Colleges, and Universities; and Research and Innovation.
- In office June 25, 2014 – June 7, 2018
- Leader: Andrea Horwath

Member of the Ontario Provincial Parliament for London West
- Incumbent
- Assumed office September 9, 2013
- Preceded by: Chris Bentley

Personal details
- Born: 1962 (age 63–64) Dundas, Ontario
- Party: New Democratic
- Spouse: Neil Bradford
- Children: 2
- Occupation: Policy analyst

Peggy Sattler (born c. 1962) is a politician in Ontario, Canada. She has been a New Democratic Member of Provincial Parliament of the Legislative Assembly of Ontario representing the riding of London West since 2013.

== Background ==
Sattler was born in Dundas, Ontario. She attended McMaster University where she earned a bachelor's degree in political science and a master's degree at Western University in educational policy. Sattler was working on the master’s degree when she went to Ottawa as a staffer for NDP MPs Marion Dewar and Jack Whittaker from 1987-90. There she met her future husband, a fellow staffer named Neil Bradford. She also served on the staff of NDP MPP Marilyn Churley at Queen’s Park from 1990–95, after which she and her husband moved to London in 1995 from Toronto. She was a Thames Valley District School Board trustee for 13 years, including terms as vice-chair from 2004 to 2006 and chair from 2006 to 2008. Sattler was also Western Region vice-president of the Ontario Public School Boards' Association. Professionally, until her election as MPP, Sattler was director of policy studies with the Academica Group, specializing in post-secondary education issues. She lives in London with her husband Neil Bradford and their two children.

== Politics ==
Sattler was elected in a by-election on August 1, 2013. She ran as the New Democratic candidate in the riding of London West. She defeated Progressive Conservative candidate Ali Chahbar by 3,381 votes. She was re-elected in the 2014 provincial election defeating PC candidate Jeff Bennett by 5,951 votes. She was also re-elected in 2018, 2022, and 2025 by wide margins.

She served as the party's Critic for Colleges & Universities and the Chief Opposition Whip, among other roles.

In 2026, her London West constituency office was vandalized.

== Electoral record ==
2025 Ontario general election: London West
Party	Candidate	Votes	%	±%	Expenditures
New Democratic	Peggy Sattler	26,589	49.21	+4.08	$108,761
Progressive Conservative	Beth Allison	18,892	34.96	+1.11	$97,451
Liberal	Baqar Khan	5,991	11.09	–1.10	$30,023
Green	Jim Johnston	1,021	1.89	–1.54	$536
New Blue	Shane Dale	636	1.18	–1.38	$0
Libertarian	Ken Byma	572	1.06	+0.19	$0
Freedom	Tim Hodges	179	0.33	–0.06	$0
Independent	Timothy Hammer	153	0.28	–	$0
Total valid votes/expense limit		54,033	99.54	–	$174,901
Total rejected, unmarked and declined ballots		252	0.46	–0.05	
Turnout		54,285	49.97	+1.35	
Eligible voters		108,634			
New Democratic hold		Swing		+2.59	
Source: Elections Ontario

2022 Ontario general election: London West
Party	Candidate	Votes	%	±%	Expenditures
New Democratic	Peggy Sattler	22,510	45.13	–10.21	$126,499
Progressive Conservative	Paul Paolatto	16,886	33.85	+4.81	$92,003
Liberal	Vanessa Lalonde	6,077	12.18	+2.27	$27,325
Green	Colleen McCauley	1,713	3.43	–0.31	$2,016
New Blue	Kristopher Hunt	1,277	2.56	–	$5,424
Ontario Party	Cynthia Workman	521	1.04	–	$2,767
Libertarian	Jacques Y. Boudreau	434	0.87	–0.07	$0
Consensus Ontario	Brad Harness	267	0.54	+0.02	$0
Freedom	Mike McMullen	197	0.39	+0.04	$0
Total valid votes/expense limit		49,882	99.49	–	$144,777
Total rejected, unmarked and declined ballots		257	0.51	–0.83	
Turnout		50,139	48.62	–11.94	
Eligible voters		103,127			
New Democratic hold		Swing		▼7.51	
Source: Elections Ontario

2018 Ontario general election: London West
Party	Candidate	Votes	%	±%
New Democratic	Peggy Sattler	32,644	55.33	+14.97
Progressive Conservative	Andrew Lawton	17,133	29.04	-0.53
Liberal	Jonathan Hughes	5,847	9.91	-13.81
Green	Pamela Reid	2,211	3.75	-0.44
Libertarian	Jacques Boudreau	552	0.94	
Consensus Ontario	Brad Harness	304	0.52	
Freedom	Tracey Pringle	209	0.35	-1.81
Communist	Michael Lewis	96	0.16	
Total valid votes		58,996	98.65	-0.21
Total rejected, unmarked and declined ballots		805	1.35	+0.21
Turnout		59,801	60.56	+4.53
Eligible voters		98,749		
New Democratic hold		Swing		
Source: Elections Ontario

2014 Ontario general election: London West
Party	Candidate	Votes	%	±%
New Democratic	Peggy Sattler	22,243	40.36	-1.52
Progressive Conservative	Jeff Bennett	16,295	29.57	-3.17
Liberal	Nick Steinburg	13,070	23.72	+7.87
Green	Keith McAlister	2,310	4.19	-0.06
Freedom	Al Gretzky	1,188	2.16	-2.80
Total valid votes		55,106	98.86	-0.40
Total rejected, unmarked and declined ballots		633	1.14	+0.40
Turnout		55,739	56.03	+16.86
Eligible voters		98,749		
New Democratic hold		Swing		+0.82
Source: Elections Ontario

Ontario provincial by-election, August 1, 2013 Resignation of Chris Bentley
Party	Candidate	Votes	%	±%
New Democratic	Peggy Sattler	15,704	41.88	+20.16
Progressive Conservative	Ali Chahbar	12,426	32.74	+3.26
Liberal	Ken Coran	5,965	15.85	-29.81
Freedom	Al Gretzky	1,856	4.96	+4.36
Green	Gary Brown	1,608	4.25	+1.84
Libertarian	Geoffrey Serbee	117	0.31	
Total valid votes		37,676	99.26	
Total rejected, unmarked and declined ballots		279	0.74	
Turnout		37,955	39.17	
Eligible voters		96,905		
New Democratic gain from Liberal		Swing		+8.45
Source: Elections Ontario
