= Chris Bentley (politician) =

Canadian politician

The Honourable Christopher Bentley ECO

Ontario MPP
- In office 2003–2013
- Preceded by: Bob Wood
- Succeeded by: Peggy Sattler
- Constituency: London West

Personal details
- Born: 1956 (age 69–70)
- Party: Liberal
- Spouse: Wendy
- Children: 2
- Occupation: lawyer

Christopher Bentley (born c. 1956) is a former politician in Ontario, Canada. He was a Liberal member of the Legislative Assembly of Ontario from 2003 to 2013. He represented the riding of London West and was a cabinet minister in the government of Dalton McGuinty.

== Background ==
Bentley received a Bachelor of Arts degree from the University of Western Ontario in London, Ontario, and obtained a law degree from the University of Toronto in 1979. Two years later, he obtained a Master's degree from Cambridge University in England. Bentley has practiced criminal and labour law, with the firm of Bentley & LeRoy LLP. In 1985, he was a founder and first chairperson of Neighbourhood Legal Services London & Middlesex, a legal clinic intended to assist low-income clients.

Since 1992, Bentley has worked as a part-time professor at Western. He helped establish the university's Law School Careers Office, and has lectured at various continuing education courses. In 2000, he published a book entitled Criminal practice manual: A practical guide to handling criminal cases.

== Politics ==
Bentley ran for the provincial legislature in the 2003 general election, contesting the riding of London West as a Liberal. He was successful, defeating incumbent Progressive Conservative Bob Wood by over 10,000 votes. The Liberals won the election, and Bentley was appointed Minister of Labour on October 23, 2003. After a cabinet shuffle on June 29, 2005, he was named Minister of Training, Colleges and Universities.

Bentley was re-elected in the 2007 election and was named Attorney General of Ontario shortly thereafter. In January 2010 he was assigned the additional portfolio of Minister of Aboriginal Affairs.

He retained his seat in the October 2011 provincial election, and was named Minister of Energy. Bentley was soon mired in controversy over the government's decision made during the election campaign to scrap unpopular gas plants being constructed in Mississauga and Oakville - the move was seen as a politically expedient one made to improve the Liberal Party's chances of retaining the 5 ridings it held in the area. The election returned a minority government and the emboldened opposition demanded that Bentley's ministry release all documents related to the decision. Bentley delayed releasing 36,000 pages in September and insisted that all documents had been released. After it became known that there were an additional 20,000 documents Bentley was cited by a rare contempt motion by a legislative committee and was facing a contempt motion of the legislature when McGuinty unexpectedly ended the legislative session by proroguing the legislature on October 15.

Previously, Bentley had widely been seen as Premier Dalton McGuinty's apparent heir but on October 25, 2012, ten days after McGuinty announced his resignation, Bentley announced that he would not be a candidate in the Liberal Party leadership convention being held to choose McGuinty's successor and that he too would be leaving politics. Bentley resigned his seat in the legislature effective February 14, 2013.

=== Cabinet positions ===
McGuinty ministry, Province of Ontario (2003–2013)
Cabinet posts (6)
Predecessor	Office	Successor
Kathleen Wynne	Minister of Aboriginal Affairs; 2012–2013	David Zimmer
Brad Duguid	Minister of Energy; 2011–2013	Bob Chiarelli
Brad Duguid	Minister of Aboriginal Affairs; 2010–2011	Kathleen Wynne
Michael Bryant	Attorney General of Ontario; 2007–2011	John Gerretsen
Mary Anne Chambers	Minister of Training, Colleges and Universities; 2005–2007	John Milloy
Brad Clark	Minister of Labour; 2003–2005	Steve Peters

=== Electoral record ===
2011 Ontario general election: London West
Party	Candidate	Votes	%	±%
Liberal	Chris Bentley	22,610	45.65	-6.77
Progressive Conservative	Ali Chahbar	14,603	29.49	+5.24
New Democratic	Jeff Buchanan	10,757	21.72	+10.49
Green	Gary Brown	1,194	2.41	-8.06
Freedom	Tim Hodges	300	0.61	+0.13
Republican	Chris Gupta	61	0.12	-0.09
Total valid votes		49,525	100.0	
Total rejected ballots		224	0.45	
Turnout		49,749	53.01	
Eligible voters		93,852		
Liberal hold		Swing		-6.00
Source: Elections Ontario

2007 Ontario general election: London West
Party	Candidate	Votes	%	±%
Liberal	Chris Bentley	25,967	52.42	+1.91
Progressive Conservative	Allison Graham	12,011	24.25	-6.82
New Democratic	Paul Pighin	5,562	11.23	-4.05
Green	Gary Brown	5,184	10.47	+8.85
Family Coalition	Andrew Jezierski	267	0.54	
Freedom	Paul McKeever	234	0.47	-0.46
Independent	Mike Reynolds	201	0.41	
Republican	Chris Gupta	106	0.21	
Total valid votes		49,532	100.0	
Difference		13,956	28.18	
Total rejected ballots		356	0.71	
Turnout		49,888	57.83	
Liberal hold		Swing	+4.37	
Source:^ Change based on redistributed results

2003 Ontario general election: London West
Party	Candidate	Votes	%	±%
Liberal	Chris Bentley	25,581	51.46	+7.12
Progressive Conservative	Bob Wood	15,463	31.11	-13.81
New Democratic	Patti Dalton	7,403	14.89	+5.76
Green	Laura Wythe	805	1.62	+1.01
Freedom	Bill Frampton	460	0.93	+0.46
Total valid votes		49,712	100.0	
