= Gary Bennett (politician) =

Canadian politician and businessman, Mayor of Kingston, Ontario (1994–2000)

Gary Bennett is a Canadian politician and businessman who served as mayor of Kingston, Ontario from 1994 to 2000. He was a candidate of the Progressive Conservative Party of Ontario in the 2018 and 2022 provincial elections.

== Work and education ==
Bennett graduated from Loyalist Collegiate and Vocational Institute in 1972. He later earned a BA Honours in Political Science and a Master’s in Public Administration from Queen’s University at Kingston. He has been involved with the riding associations of the Progressive Conservative Party of Canada, its successor, the Conservative Party of Canada, and the Progressive Conservative Party of Ontario.

== Local councillor ==
Bennett began serving on Kingston City Council after being elected as the city councillor for St. Lawrence Ward in 1988. From 1988 to 1994, he served two consecutive terms as councillor for the St. Lawrence district in the City of Kingston.

During his time in the council, Bennett served on various civic boards within the region. He was also active in the Association of Municipalities of Ontario (AMO), serving on the Large Urban Caucus.

== Mayor ==
Bennett was elected to two terms as mayor of the City of Kingston, serving his first term from 1994 to 1997. As mayor, he was involved in the amalgamation process that created the new City of Kingston through the merger of the former City of Kingston, Kingston Township, and Pittsburgh Township. The area reached a locally negotiated agreement on amalgamation, which was not universally achieved in Ontario. As part of the amalgamation agreement, the local Public Utilities Commission was also assumed by the new City of Kingston. Bennett served as the last mayor of the former City of Kingston.

In 1996, during his first term in office, Bennett spoke at the yearly gravesite ceremony honouring Canada's first prime minister, John A. Macdonald, who was also a Kingston resident. His address was later published by the Kingston Historical Society.

Bennett was elected in 1997 as the first mayor of the newly amalgamated City of Kingston, serving from 1997 to 2000. During his term, the city responded to a locally declared civic emergency, the Ice Storm of 1998. Also during his term, the city established a yearly capital surcharge on all property tax classes. Bennett also chaired a local United Way campaign.

Bennett ran unsuccessfully for re-election in 2000, losing to Isabel Turner. Challenges associated with the new city's first post-amalgamation government were cited as a factor in the election outcome.

== Provincial politics ==
On June 11, 2017, Bennett was nominated to represent the Ontario Progressive Conservative Party in Kingston and the Islands in the 2018 provincial election. He succeeded against three other challengers for the nomination, but was defeated in the subsequent provincial election, placing third behind the NDP and Liberal candidates.

In 2022, Bennett again ran for the Kingston and the Islands riding and again placed third.

2022 Ontario general election: Kingston and the Islands
Party	Candidate	Votes	%	±%	Expenditures
Liberal	Ted Hsu	18,360	37.66	+10.14	$75,749
New Democratic	Mary Rita Holland	15,186	31.15	−8.00	$130,691
Progressive Conservative	Gary Bennett	11,973	24.56	−1.52	$62,419
Green	Zachary Typhair	1,601	3.28	−3.14	$15,397
Ontario Party	Shalea Beckwith	827	1.70		$7,396
New Blue	Stephen Skyvington	429	0.88		$7,078
Independent	Shelley Joanne Galloway	130	0.27		$0
Communist	Sebastian Vaillancourt	123	0.25		$0
Consensus Ontario	Laurel Claus Johnson	120	0.25		$0
Total valid votes/expense limit		48,749	99.49		$146,496
Total rejected, unmarked, and declined ballots		249	0.51	−0.40	
Turnout		48,998	46.84	−10.45	
Eligible voters		104,601			
Liberal gain from New Democratic		Swing		+9.07	
Source(s): "Data Explorer". Elections Ontario. 2025.

2018 Ontario general election: Kingston and the Islands
Party	Candidate	Votes	%	±%
New Democratic	Ian Arthur	21,788	39.16	+9.73
Liberal	Sophie Kiwala	15,312	27.52	−14.54
Progressive Conservative	Gary Bennett	14,512	26.08	+5.28
Green	Robert Kiley	3,574	6.42	−0.81
Libertarian	Heather Cunningham	274	0.49	
Trillium	Andre Imbeault	184	0.33	
Total valid votes		55,644	99.09	
Total rejected, unmarked and declined ballots		510	0.91	
Turnout		56,154	57.29	
Eligible voters		98,020		
New Democratic gain from Liberal		Swing		+12.14
Source: Elections Ontario
