= Chez Piggy =

Restaurant in downtown Kingston, Ontario

Coordinates: 44.231265°N 76.481483°W

Chez Piggy is a restaurant in downtown Kingston, Ontario.

== History ==
Chez Piggy was opened on February 7, 1979 by Zal Yanovsky of the 1960s pop group the Lovin' Spoonful and his partner Rose Richardson. The couple were avid travellers who enjoyed good food and wanted to create a restaurant reflecting those traits. The restaurant is located in a formerly abandoned limestone horse stable that was built in 1806. Now a popular culinary tourist attraction, the restaurant is recognized as a local landmark. Zoe Yanovsky took over as operating owner of both Chez Piggy and Pan Chancho when her father died in 2002.

A former Member of Provincial Parliament for Kingston and the Islands, Ian Arthur, served as the executive chef at Chez Piggy until his election to the provincial legislature in 2018.

== Awards ==
In 2015, Chez Piggy was named Kingston's best-known restaurant by the National Post. In 2016, it received the Ontario Hostelry Institute (OHI) Gold Award.

== Sources ==
- Newbury, Victoria, ed. (1998). The Chez Piggy Cookbook: Recipes From the Celebrated Restaurant and Bakery. Richmond Hill: Firefly Books. ISBN 978-1-55209-296-5 – via the Internet Archive.
