= John Cameron Wilson =

Canadian politician from Ontario

Member of the Ontario Provincial Parliament for London South
- In office December 1, 1926 – April 3, 1934
- Preceded by: constituency established
- Succeeded by: George Jackson

Personal details
- Party: Progressive Conservative

John Cameron Wilson was a Canadian politician from the Progressive Conservative Party of Ontario. He represented London South in the Legislative Assembly of Ontario from 1926 to 1934. He was also a physician, replacing Hadley Williams as surgeon at Victoria Hospital in London.

== See also ==
- 17th Parliament of Ontario
- 18th Parliament of Ontario
