= David Winninger =

Canadian politician

Ontario MPP
- In office 1990–1995
- Preceded by: Joan Smith
- Succeeded by: Bob Wood
- Constituency: London South

Personal details
- Born: October 10, 1949 (age 76) London, Ontario, Canada
- Party: New Democrat
- Occupation: Lawyer

David Winninger (born October 10, 1949) is a former politician in Ontario, Canada. He was a New Democratic member of the Legislative Assembly of Ontario from 1990 to 1995 representing the riding of London South. From 2000 to 2010 he was a municipal councillor in the city of London, Ontario.

== Background ==
Winninger has a Bachelor of Arts degree and a Master of Arts degree from the University of Western Ontario, as well as a law degree (LLB 1978) from McGill University in Montreal. He practiced law for 10 years before entering political life and received the Quebec Bar Prize in 1977.

== Politics ==
=== Provincial ===
Winninger ran for the Ontario legislature in the 1985 provincial election, finishing in third place against Liberal Joan Smith in the riding of London South. He ran again in the 1987 provincial election, and again placed third.

The NDP won a majority government in the 1990 provincial election, and Winninger was elected as an MPP for London South. He served as a parliamentary assistant from 1990 to 1995 to the Attorney General. In 1992, he passed a private member's bill to save the Talbot Block, an historical site within London.

The NDP were defeated in the 1995 provincial election, and Winninger lost his seat to Progressive Conservative Bob Wood by over 7,000 votes.

=== Municipal ===
Winninger was elected to London City Council in 2000. He won re-election in 2003. In 2006, he was elected as councillor for Ward 11 in London's revised ward system of 14 wards—each represented by one councillor. In addition, he sat on the London Public Library Board until his defeat in the 2010 municipal elections.
