= Keith Norton =

Canadian politician (1941–2010)

Ontario MPP
- In office 1975–1985
- Preceded by: Syl Apps
- Succeeded by: Ken Keyes
- Constituency: Kingston and the Islands

Chief Commissioner of the Ontario Human Rights Commission
- In office 1996–2005
- Preceded by: Rosemary Brown
- Succeeded by: Barbara Hall

Personal details
- Born: January 26, 1941 Claremont, Ontario
- Died: January 31, 2010 (aged 69) Toronto, Ontario
- Party: Progressive Conservative
- Occupation: Teacher, Attorney

Keith Calder Norton (January 26, 1941 – January 31, 2010) was a Canadian politician and public servant. He served as a Progressive Conservative member of the Legislative Assembly of Ontario from 1975 to 1985, and was until 2005 the chief commissioner of the Ontario Human Rights Commission.

== Background ==
Norton was educated at Queen's University in Kingston, and worked as a lawyer after his graduation.

== Politics ==
He was elected as an alderman in Kingston in 1972, and became the city's deputy mayor in 1974.

He was elected to the Ontario legislature in the 1975 provincial election, defeating Liberal candidate Ken Keyes by 203 votes in Kingston and the Islands. He served as a backbench supporter of Bill Davis's government for the next two years, and was re-elected with an increased majority in the 1977 election.

Norton was appointed to cabinet on February 3, 1977, as Minister of Community and Social Services and held this portfolio throughout the parliament that followed. Re-elected without difficulty in the 1981 provincial election, he was appointed as Minister of the Environment on April 10, 1981. As environment minister, he became the first Canadian politician to speak before a committee of the United States Senate.

Norton was transferred to the Ministry of Health on July 6, 1983, and held this position until Davis resigned as Premier in early 1985. He supported Dennis Timbrell's unsuccessful bid to succeed Davis as Progressive Conservative Party leader in January 1985. When Frank Miller succeeded Davis as Premier of Ontario on February 8, 1985, he appointed Norton as Minister of Education and Minister of Colleges and Universities.

The Progressive Conservatives lost government following the 1985 provincial election, and Norton was personally defeated in the Kingston and the Islands riding, losing to Keyes by more than 2,000 votes.

=== Cabinet positions ===
Miller ministry, Province of Ontario (1985)
Cabinet posts (2)
| Predecessor | Office | Successor |
|---|---|---|
| Bette Stephenson | Minister of Education; 1985 (February–May) | Larry Grossman |
| Bette Stephenson | Minister of Colleges and Universities; 1985 (February–May) | Larry Grossman |
Davis ministry, Province of Ontario (1971–1985)
Cabinet posts (3)
| Predecessor | Office | Successor |
| Thomas Wells | Minister of Health; 1983–1985 | Alan Pope |
| Harry Parrott | Minister of Environment; 1981–1983 | Andy Brandt |
| James Taylor | Minister of Community and Social Services; 1977–1981 | Frank Drea |

== Later life ==
After leaving politics in 1985, Norton became a businessman and consultant, working in the field of water purification. He attempted to return to politics in the 1990 election, running in Toronto against Liberal Attorney General Ian Scott. Norton had come out of the closet by this point, and ran as an openly gay politician in the riding of St. George—St. David, which includes Toronto's Church and Wellesley neighbourhood, Canada's largest gay village.

While Scott was criticized for not being open about his sexuality, Norton was derided for opportunism, declaring himself openly gay only after he'd decided to run in a riding with a large gay population. Norton finished third, behind Scott and the NDP candidate.

== Human rights commissioner ==
In 1992, Norton was appointed to the Canadian Human Rights Tribunal, and served as its president from 1992 until 1995. On July 18, 1996, Norton was appointed chief commissioner of the Ontario Human Rights Commission by Premier Mike Harris. From 1996 to 2004, he pushed for higher standards of protection for people with disabilities, and jump started the move to abolish mandatory retirement in Ontario. In late 2004, he argued that racial profiling was still a serious problem in Ontario. Norton has also been active in promoting gay rights. Norton's third term as Chief Commissioner ended in November 2005. He was succeeded by former Toronto Mayor Barbara Hall.

== Final years ==
After leaving the OHRC, Norton went to work as a mediator/arbitrator for a company that specializes in settling disputes between parties outside of court.

Norton died on January 31, 2010, of cancer at the Toronto General Hospital. A funeral was held on February 10, 2010 at the Trinity-St. Paul's United Church in Toronto.
