= Kingston and the Islands (provincial electoral district) =

Provincial electoral district in Ontario, Canada

Coordinates: 44.23°N 76.48°W

Ontario electoral district
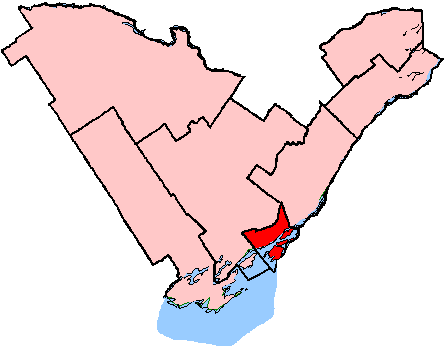
- Kingston and the Islands shown within the Eastern Ontario region

Provincial electoral district
- Legislature: Legislative Assembly of Ontario
MPP
Ted Hsu
Liberal
- District created: 1966
- First contested: 1967
- Last contested: 2025

Demographics
- Population (2021): 126,106
- Electors (2025): 105,697
- Area (km²): 665
- Pop. density (per km²): 189.6
- Census division: Frontenac
- Census subdivision(s): Frontenac Islands, Kingston

Kingston and the Islands is a provincial electoral district in Ontario, Canada, that has been represented in the Legislative Assembly of Ontario since 1967.

It covers the city of Kingston and the nearby areas, including the sparsely populated Frontenac Islands in the St. Lawrence River. It has been represented by Ted Hsu since 2022.

== Demographics ==
- Average family income: $68,494 (2001)
- Median household income: $46,310
- Unemployment: 7.4%
- Language, mother tongue: English 84%, French 3%, other 13%
- Religion: Protestant 44%, Catholic 33%, Orthodox Christian 1%, other Christian 2%, Muslim 1%, Jewish 1%, non religious affiliation 18%, other 1%
- Visible minority: Black 1%, Chinese 1%, South Asian 1%, others 2%

== Boundaries ==
The riding was created before the 1967 provincial election. Its initial area consisted of the townships of Amherst Island, Howe Island and Wolfe Island, the city of Kingston and the islands in the St. Lawrence River within the county of Frontenac. In 1986, it was changed slightly to include Kingston and the three major islands plus all the land south of Highway 401 within the township of Pittsburgh.

In 1996, the provincial government reduced the number of ridings in the province from 130 to 103. They also directed the new ridings to correspond to the boundaries of the existing federal ridings. At that time, the federal counterpart, Kingston and the Islands, existed with the same boundaries as the current provincial riding. After the 1999 election, minor changes to the riding were made along with the federal counterpart in 2003 and 2013.

== Members of Provincial Parliament ==
Kingston and the Islands
Assembly	Years	Member	Party
Riding created from Kingston
28th	1967–1971	Syl Apps	Progressive Conservative
29th	1971–1975	Syl Apps	Progressive Conservative
30th	1975–1977	Keith Norton	Progressive Conservative
31st	1977–1981	Keith Norton	Progressive Conservative
32nd	1981–1985	Keith Norton	Progressive Conservative
33rd	1985–1987	Ken Keyes	Liberal
34th	1987–1990	Ken Keyes	Liberal
35th	1990–1995	Gary Wilson	New Democratic
36th	1995–1999	John Gerretsen	Liberal
37th	1999–2003	John Gerretsen	Liberal
38th	2003–2007	John Gerretsen	Liberal
39th	2007–2011	John Gerretsen	Liberal
40th	2011–2014	John Gerretsen	Liberal
41st	2014–2018	Sophie Kiwala	Liberal
42nd	2018–2022	Ian Arthur	New Democratic
43rd	2022–2025	Ted Hsu	Liberal
44th	2025–present	Ted Hsu	Liberal
Sourced from the Ontario Legislative Assembly

== Election results ==
Winning party in each polling division of Kingston and the Islands at the 2025 Ontario general election

2025 Ontario general election
Party	Candidate	Votes	%	±%	Expenditures
Liberal	Ted Hsu	33,288	61.57	+23.91	$72,496
Progressive Conservative	Ian Chapelle	12,022	22.24	–2.32	$50,937
New Democratic	Elliot Goodell Ugalde	6,663	12.32	–18.83	$39,682
Green	Zachary Typhair	1,195	2.21	–1.07	$7,532
Ontario Party	Allan Wilson	565	1.05	–0.65	$0
None of the Above	James McNair	331	0.61	–	$0
Total valid votes/expense limit		54,064	99.24	–	$176,327
Total rejected, unmarked and declined ballots		412	0.76	+0.25	
Turnout		54,476	49.74	+2.90	
Eligible voters		109,520			
Liberal hold		Swing		+13.12	
Source: Elections Ontario

Winning party in each polling division of Kingston and the Islands at the 2022 Ontario general election

2022 Ontario general election
Party	Candidate	Votes	%	±%	Expenditures
Liberal	Ted Hsu	18,360	37.66	+10.14	$75,749
New Democratic	Mary Rita Holland	15,186	31.15	–8.00	$130,691
Progressive Conservative	Gary Bennett	11,973	24.56	–1.52	$62,419
Green	Zachary Typhair	1,601	3.28	–3.14	$15,397
Ontario Party	Shalea Beckwith	827	1.70	–	$7,396
New Blue	Stephen Skyvington	429	0.88	–	$7,078
Independent	Shelley Joanne Galloway	130	0.27	–	$0
Communist	Sebastian Vaillancourt	123	0.25	–	$0
Consensus Ontario	Laurel Claus Johnson	120	0.25	–	$0
Total valid votes/expense limit		48,749	99.49		$146,496
Total rejected, unmarked and declined ballots		249	0.51	–0.40	
Turnout		48,998	46.84	–10.45	
Eligible voters		104,601			
Liberal gain from New Democratic		Swing		▲9.07	
Source: Elections Ontario

2018 Ontario general election
Party	Candidate	Votes	%	±%
New Democratic	Ian Arthur	21,788	39.16	+9.73
Liberal	Sophie Kiwala	15,312	27.52	–14.54
Progressive Conservative	Gary Bennett	14,512	26.08	+5.28
Green	Robert Kiley	3,574	6.42	–0.81
Libertarian	Heather Cunningham	274	0.49	–
Trillium	Andre Imbeault	184	0.33	–
Total valid votes		55,644	99.09	
Total rejected, unmarked and declined ballots		510	0.91	–0.20
Turnout		56,154	57.29	+5.15
Eligible voters		98,020		
New Democratic notional gain from Liberal		Swing		+12.14
Source: Elections Ontario

2014 general election redistributed results
Party	Vote	%
Liberal	19,698	42.06
New Democratic	13,781	29.42
Progressive Conservative	9,744	20.80
Green	3,388	7.23
Freedom	224	0.48

2014 Ontario general election
Party	Candidate	Votes	%	±%
Liberal	Sophie Kiwala	20,838	41.59	–7.26
New Democratic	Mary Rita Holland	14,811	29.56	+5.77
Progressive Conservative	Mark Bain	10,652	21.26	–1.06
Green	Robert Kiley	3,566	7.12	+3.41
Freedom	Jonathan Reid	242	0.48	+0.32
Total valid votes		50,109	98.89	
Total rejected, unmarked and declined ballots		563	1.11	+0.73
Turnout		50,672	52.14	+7.11
Eligible voters		97,188		
Liberal hold		Swing		–6.51
Source: Elections Ontario

2011 Ontario general election
Party	Candidate	Votes	%	±%	Expenditures
Liberal	John Gerretsen	21,028	48.84	+1.61	$71,020.00
New Democratic	Mary Rita Holland	10,241	23.79	+3.24	$34,982.21
Progressive Conservative	Rodger James	9,610	22.32	+0.00	$45,336.00
Green	Robert Kiley	1,594	3.70	–5.06	$15,086.56
Family Coalition	David Caracciolo	336	0.78	–0.07	$2,857.71
Libertarian	Jamie Shaw	115	0.27	–	$0
Freedom	Paul Busch	71	0.16	–0.11	$0
Republican	David Best	56	0.13	–	$0
Total valid votes/expense limit		43,051	99.62	–	$114,204.30
Total rejected, unmarked and declined ballots		163	0.38	–0.20	
Turnout		43,214	45.03	–8.93	
Eligible voters		95,966			
Liberal hold		Swing		–0.81	
Source: Elections Ontario

2007 Ontario general election
Party	Candidate	Votes	%	±%	Expenditures
Liberal	John Gerretsen	23,277	47.23	–13.05	$64,512.47
Progressive Conservative	John Rapin	11,001	22.32	+2.20	$69,700.00
New Democratic	Rick Downes	10,129	20.55	+9.04	$56,689.54
Green	Bridget Doherty	4,321	8.77	+2.22	$13,098.54
Family Coalition	Chris Beneteau	419	0.85	–0.68	$0
Freedom	Mark Fournier	137	0.28	–	$0
Total valid votes/expense limit		49,284	99.42	–	$99,207.72
Total rejected, unmarked and declined ballots		286	0.58	+0.12	
Turnout		49,570	53.96	–0.33	
Eligible voters		91,859			
Liberal hold		Swing		–7.62	
Source: Elections Ontario

2003 Ontario general election
Party	Candidate	Votes	%	±%	Expenditures
Liberal	John Gerretsen	28,877	60.28	+5.58	$57,119.88
Progressive Conservative	Hans Westenberg	9,640	20.12	–9.94	$43,307.95
New Democratic	Janet C. Collins	5,514	11.51	+0.23	$23,161.12
Green	Eric B. Walton	3,137	6.55	+4.11	$19,292.20
Family Coalition	Chris Beneteau	735	1.53	+0.40	$551.01
Total valid votes/expense limit		47,903	99.54	–	$85,086.72
Total rejected, unmarked and declined ballots		219	0.46	–0.26	
Turnout		48,122	54.29	–0.22	
Eligible voters		88,634			
Liberal hold		Swing		+7.76	
Source: Elections Ontario

1999 Ontario general election
Party	Candidate	Votes	%	±%	Expenditures
Liberal	John Gerretsen	26,355	54.70	+17.80	$40,703.00
Progressive Conservative	Bob Pickering	14,487	30.07	–0.60	$65,682.63
New Democratic	Beth Pater	5,436	11.28	–17.53	$26,106.42
Green	Chris Paul Walker	1,174	2.44	–	$4,848.00
Family Coalition	Chris Beneteau	546	1.13	–1.94	$15.00
Natural Law	Gerard Morris	182	0.38	–0.18	$0
Total valid votes/expense limit		48,180	99.29	–	$85,460.16
Total rejected, unmarked and declined ballots		345	0.71	–0.09	
Turnout		48,525	54.51	–6.57	
Eligible voters		89,021			
Liberal hold		Swing		+9.20	
Source: Elections Ontario

1995 Ontario general election
Party	Candidate	Votes	%	±%	Expenditures
Liberal	John Gerretsen	10,314	36.90	+6.72	$33,086.00
Progressive Conservative	Sally Barnes	8,571	30.67	+4.26	$40,705.44
New Democratic	Gary Wilson	8,052	28.81	–9.18	$30,908.12
Family Coalition	John Pacheco	858	3.07	–2.35	$6,044.53
Natural Law	Ronald J. Dunphy	155	0.55	–	$0
Total valid votes/expense limit		27,950	99.20	–	$45,281.00
Total rejected, unmarked and declined ballots		225	0.80	–0.26	
Turnout		28,175	61.08	+4.09	
Eligible voters		46,125			
Liberal gain from New Democratic		Swing		+7.95	
Source: Elections Ontario

1990 Ontario general election
Party	Candidate	Votes	%	±%
New Democratic	Gary Wilson	10,184	37.99	+13.33
Liberal	Ken Keyes	8,092	30.19	–20.43
Progressive Conservative	John Goodchild	7,079	26.41	+3.64
Family Coalition	Joan Jackson	1,452	5.42	–
Total valid votes		26,807	98.94	
Total rejected, unmarked and declined ballots		288	1.06	+0.33
Turnout		27,095	57.00	+0.82
Eligible voters		47,537		
New Democratic gain from Liberal		Swing		+16.88
Source: Elections Ontario

1987 Ontario general election
Party	Candidate	Votes	%	±%
Liberal	Ken Keyes	13,141	50.61	+4.28
New Democratic	Gary Wilson	6,402	24.66	+9.54
Progressive Conservative	Tom Annis	5,910	22.76	–14.68
Green	Steven Kaasgaard	511	1.97	+0.86
Total valid votes		25,964	99.26	
Total rejected ballots		193	0.74	–0.04
Turnout		26,157	56.17	–0.14
Eligible voters		46,564		
Liberal hold		Swing		–2.63
Source: Elections Ontario

1985 Ontario general election
Party	Candidate	Votes	%	±%
Liberal	Ken Keyes	11,924	46.33	+12.26
Progressive Conservative	Keith Norton	9,637	37.44	–12.81
New Democratic	Pamela Cross	3,892	15.12	–0.56
Green	Don Irvine	285	1.11	–
Total valid votes		25,738	99.23	
Total rejected ballots		201	0.77	+0.29
Turnout		25,939	56.32	–1.72
Eligible voters		46,059		
Liberal gain from Progressive Conservative		Swing		+12.54
Source: Elections Ontario

1981 Ontario general election
Party	Candidate	Votes	%	±%
Progressive Conservative	Keith Norton	12,488	50.25	–2.07
Liberal	Carl Ross	8,465	34.06	+6.33
New Democratic	Ron Murray	3,897	15.68	–3.59
Total valid votes		24,850	99.52	
Total rejected ballots		121	0.48	+0.06
Turnout		24,971	58.04	–3.47
Eligible voters		43,027		
Progressive Conservative hold		Swing		–4.20
Source: Elections Ontario

1977 Ontario general election
Party	Candidate	Votes	%	±%
Progressive Conservative	Keith Norton	12,246	52.32	+14.50
Liberal	Peter Watson	6,490	27.73	–9.28
New Democratic	John Clements	4,510	19.27	–5.41
Communist	Louise Andrews	158	0.68	+0.18
Total valid votes		23,404	99.57	
Total rejected ballots		100	0.43	+0.18
Turnout		23,504	61.50	–3.46
Eligible voters		38,217		
Progressive Conservative hold		Swing		+11.89
Source: Elections Ontario

1975 Ontario general election
Party	Candidate	Votes	%	±%
Progressive Conservative	Keith Norton	9,442	37.82	–6.10
Liberal	Ken Keyes	9,239	37.01	–6.25
New Democratic	Lars Thompson	6,161	24.68	+11.85
Communist	Ruth Miller	124	0.50	–
Total valid votes		24,966	99.75	
Total rejected ballots		62	0.25	–0.33
Turnout		25,028	64.97	–3.34
Eligible voters		38,525		
Progressive Conservative hold		Swing		+0.07
Source: Elections Ontario

1971 Ontario general election
Party	Candidate	Votes	%	±%
Progressive Conservative	Syl Apps	12,285	43.92	–3.20
Liberal	John W. Hazlett	12,098	43.25	+7.01
New Democratic	Mary Lloyd-Jones	3,587	12.82	–3.81
Total valid votes		27,970	99.42	
Total rejected ballots		163	0.58	–0.06
Turnout		28,133	68.30	+2.25
Eligible voters		41,189		
Progressive Conservative hold		Swing		–5.10
Source: Elections Ontario

1967 Ontario general election
Party	Candidate	Votes	%
Progressive Conservative	Syl Apps	10,246	47.12
Liberal	Keith A. Flannigan	7,881	36.24
New Democratic	John Meister	3,617	16.63
Total valid votes		21,744	99.36
Total rejected ballots		140	0.64
Turnout		21,884	66.05
Eligible voters		33,130	
Progressive Conservative pickup new district.			
Source: Elections Ontario

== Student vote results ==
2018 Kingston and the Islands student vote
Affiliation	Candidate	Votes	%
New Democratic	Ian Arthur	1,472	40.78
Liberal	Sophie Kiwala	766	21.22
Green	Robert Kiley	633	17.53
Progressive Conservative	Gary Bennett	567	15.71
Libertarian	Heather Cunningham	88	2.44
Trillium	Andre Imbeault	84	2.33
Source: Student Vote

== 2007 electoral reform referendum ==
2007 Ontario electoral reform referendum
Side	Votes	%
First Past the Post	26,473	54.6
Mixed member proportional	21,968	45.4
Total valid votes	48,431	100.0

== See also ==
- List of Ontario provincial electoral districts
- Canadian provincial electoral districts
