= Gordon Walker (businessman) =

Canadian politician

The Honourable Gordon Walker CM, KC, ECO

Ontario MPP
- In office 1977–1985
- Preceded by: John Ferris
- Succeeded by: Joan Smith
- Constituency: London South
- In office 1971–1975
- Preceded by: John Robarts
- Succeeded by: Marvin Shore
- Constituency: London North

Personal details
- Born: September 10, 1941 (age 84) St. Thomas, Ontario
- Party: Progressive Conservative
- Spouse: Harriet Hedley
- Children: 2
- Occupation: Lawyer

Gordon Wayne Walker CM, KC (born September 10, 1941) is a former politician in Ontario, Canada. He served in the Legislative Assembly of Ontario from 1971 to 1975, and again from 1977 to 1985. He was a member of the Progressive Conservative Party, and served as a cabinet minister in the governments of William Davis and Frank Miller.

== Background ==
Walker was born in St. Thomas, Ontario and educated at the University of Western Ontario. He worked as a lawyer, and served as an alderman in the City of London from 1967 to 1971. He and his wife Harriet have two daughters, Melanie Jennifer and Wynsome Harriet. In 1983 he published a book entitled A Conservative Canada.

== Politics ==
Walker's foray into politics began as a city councillor for London City Council when he was elected in 1966. He served for five years until he moved to the legislature in 1971.

He was elected to the Ontario legislature in the 1971 provincial election, defeating New Democratic Party candidate Charles Bigelow by 5,426 votes in London North. He served as a backbench supporter of Davis's government for the next four years, and lost to Liberal candidate Marvin Shore by 2,282 votes in the 1975 election.

Walker was returned to the legislature in the 1977 election for London South, defeating Liberal incumbent John Ferris by 2,211 votes. He was appointed to Davis's cabinet on October 18, 1978 as Minister of Correctional Services. He was named Provincial Secretary for Justice on August 30, 1979. He was re-elected without difficulty in the 1981 election.

On April 10, 1981, he was named as Minister of Consumer and Commercial Relations. After a cabinet shuffle on February 13, 1982, he left both of his former portfolios and was named Minister of Industry and Trade Development. The title Minister of Trade Development was shortened to Minister of Trade. On June 6, 1983 he changed cabinet positions becoming the Provincial Secretary of Justice, a position he held until February 1985 at which time he became the Minister of Consumer and Commercial Relations in the Cabinet of Premier Frank Miller, who had succeeded Premier Bill Davis as leader of Progressive Conservative Party. In the 1985 provincial election he was defeated losing to Liberal Joan Smith by 6,683 votes.

Walker was a prominent figure on the right wing of the Progressive Conservative Party, and developed an organization for a future leadership bid in the early 1980s. These plans fell through, and many of his supporters later turned to Frank Miller. Many believe that Davis distrusted Walker's ambitions, and demoted him to prevent his leadership campaign from developing. Walker would retain the cabinet position of Provincial Secretary for Justice. Walker supported Miller for the party leadership in January 1985, and when Miller succeeded Davis as Premier of Ontario on February 8, he appointed Walker to cabinet as Minister of Consumer and Commercial Relations.

The party was subsequently defeated in the legislature, and Miller resigned as party leader. Walker became Alan Pope's campaign manager for the November 1985 Progressive Conservative leadership convention. After Pope's elimination on the first ballot, he unsuccessfully attempted to negotiate an alliance between his candidate and Dennis Timbrell.

=== Cabinet posts ===
Miller ministry, Province of Ontario (1985)
Cabinet post (1)
Predecessor	Office	Successor
Robert Elgie	Minister of Consumer and Commercial Relations; 1985 (February–May)	Bob Runciman
Davis ministry, Province of Ontario (1971–1985)
Cabinet posts (4)
Predecessor	Office	Successor
New position	Minister of Industry and Trade Development; 1982–1983	Frank Miller
Frank Drea	Minister of Consumer and Commercial Relations; 1981–1982	Bob Mitchell
George Kerr	Provincial Secretary for Justice; 1979–1982	Norm Sterling
Frank Drea	Minister of Correctional Services; 1978–1981	Nick Leluk

== Later life ==
Walker returned to his legal practice in London after his defeat. Many of his policy views were adopted by the Progressive Conservative Party under Mike Harris in the 1990s. Walker was a fundraiser for the Federal Progressive Conservatives and was Vice Chairman of P.C. Canada Fund during the Prime Minister Brian Mulroney period. Walker was a chief fundraiser for Tom Long's bid to lead the Canadian Alliance in 2000. In the period 1993 until 2003, Walker was chief fundraiser for Mike Harris, Leader of the PC Party in Ontario, and Premier from 1995 until 2003. He was Campaign Manager - Finance for both the 1995 and 1999 successful elections for Harris.

Walker's legal practise took him to Toronto where from 1985 until 1998 he was Counsel to Toronto law firms of Holden, Murdoch and Finlay (later Holden Day Wilson), and latterly Miller Thompson; as well as being Honorary Counsel to Walker and Wood, a firm he started in London, Ontario. In 1986 Walker took a financial interest in First Canadian Property Investments Limited, a firm in which he continues as a principal. It is based in Toronto.

From 1992 until 1995 Walker was Canadian commissioner on the International Joint Commission, a treaty organization between Canada and the United States affecting issues of water quality and water quantity on the 330 lakes, rivers and streams across the common border, including the Great Lakes. He returned to the commission in 2013 and in 2014 was appointed acting chair of the Canadian section. In December 2014 he was reappointed a commissioner for a four-year term and became chair of the Canadian Section. After completing his term at the IJC he revived Walker Consulting Inc.

Walker joined the board of directors of Conrad Black's troubled Hollinger Inc. firm in January 2004. He subsequently demanded that Black resign to protect the interests of shareholders, and replaced Black as chair in November 2004. He left the firm in July 2005, shortly after describing Black's ongoing legal difficulties as a "soap opera".

Walker was appointed a Member of the Order of Canada in December 2019, "For his civil service as a parliamentarian and for his commitment to protecting transboundary waters between Canada and the United States."
