= Iona, Ontario =

Coordinates: 42°41′35″N 081°23′21″W

Iona is an unincorporated area in Dunwich County, Elgin County, Ontario, Canada.

== See also ==
- List of unincorporated communities in Ontario
