= Bob Wood (Ontario MPP) =

Canadian politician

Ontario MPP
- In office 1999–2003
- Preceded by: New riding
- Succeeded by: Chris Bentley
- Constituency: London West
- In office 1995–1999
- Preceded by: David Winninger
- Succeeded by: Riding abolished
- Constituency: London South

Personal details
- Born: October 10, 1949 (age 77) London, Ontario, Canada
- Party: Progressive Conservative
- Occupation: Lawyer

Robert Wood (born October 10, 1949) is a former politician in Ontario, Canada. He was a Progressive Conservative member of the Legislative Assembly of Ontario from 1995 to 2003 who represented the southern Ontario ridings of London South and London West.

== Background ==
Wood was educated at the University of Western Ontario, receiving a law degree in 1970. He practiced law in London, Ontario after his graduation, and was the proprietor of the firm Walker and Wood. He also served on the Board of Managers for St. Paul's Cathedral in London, and was the Board Chairman for the Western Ontario Therapeutic Community Hostel.

== Politics ==
Wood ran for the Ontario legislature in the provincial election of 1990, placing third in London South against incumbent Liberal Joan Smith and the winner, New Democrat David Winninger. He ran in the same riding in the 1995 provincial election, and easily defeated Winninger and Smith to become the riding's MPP. In the provincial election of 1999, he was re-elected over Liberal candidate Darrel Skidmore by only 294 votes in the redistributed riding of London West.

Wood was regarded as a maverick right-winger in the Progressive Conservative caucus. He supported the Reform Party of Canada at the federal level, and holds socially conservative opinions on several issues, including abortion. During his first term in the legislature, he introduced a private-member's bill which would have mandated a 45-day waiting period for couples wishing to marry, unless they agreed to eight hours of counselling. He also criticized a government grant to Anti-Racist Action in 1999, describing the group as a leftist organization given to violence. It was probably for these reasons that Wood was never appointed to cabinet by Mike Harris or Ernie Eves. Wood also criticized his government's plan to reform the provincial system of legal billing.

Wood lost his seat to Liberal Chris Bentley by over 10,000 votes in the 2003 provincial election. He remains politically active in the London region, and in November 2004 criticized the Liberal government of Dalton McGuinty for its handling of London's hospital system.

Wood supported Frank Klees for the leadership of the Ontario PC Party in 2004.
