= Dutton/Dunwich =

- Municipality (lower-tier)
- Municipality of Dutton/Dunwich
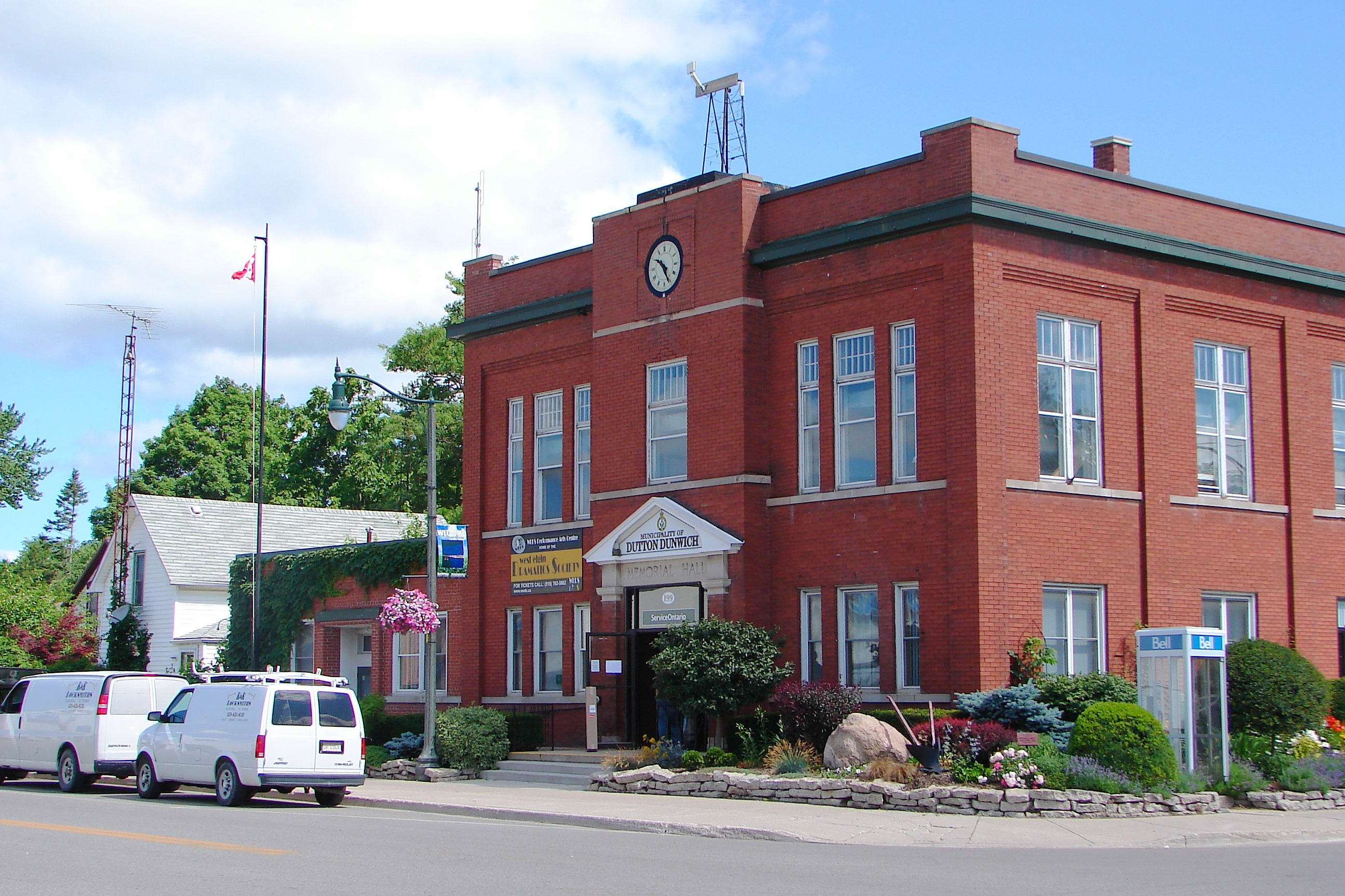
- Dutton/Dunwich Municipal Hall

- Location in Elgin County Dutton/Dunwich (Southern Ontario)
- Coordinates: 42°40′N 81°30′W
- Country: Canada
- Province: Ontario
- County: Elgin
- Formed: 1998

Government
  - Mayor: Mike Hentz
  - Federal riding: Elgin—St. Thomas—London South
  - Prov. riding: Elgin—Middlesex—London

Area
  - Land: 294.58 km^{2} (113.74 sq mi)

Population (2016)
  - Total: 3,866
  - Density: 13.1/km^{2} (34/sq mi)
- Time zone: UTC-5 (EST)
  - Summer (DST): UTC-4 (EDT)
- Postal Code: N0L
- Area codes: 519 and 226
- Website: www.duttondunwich.on.ca

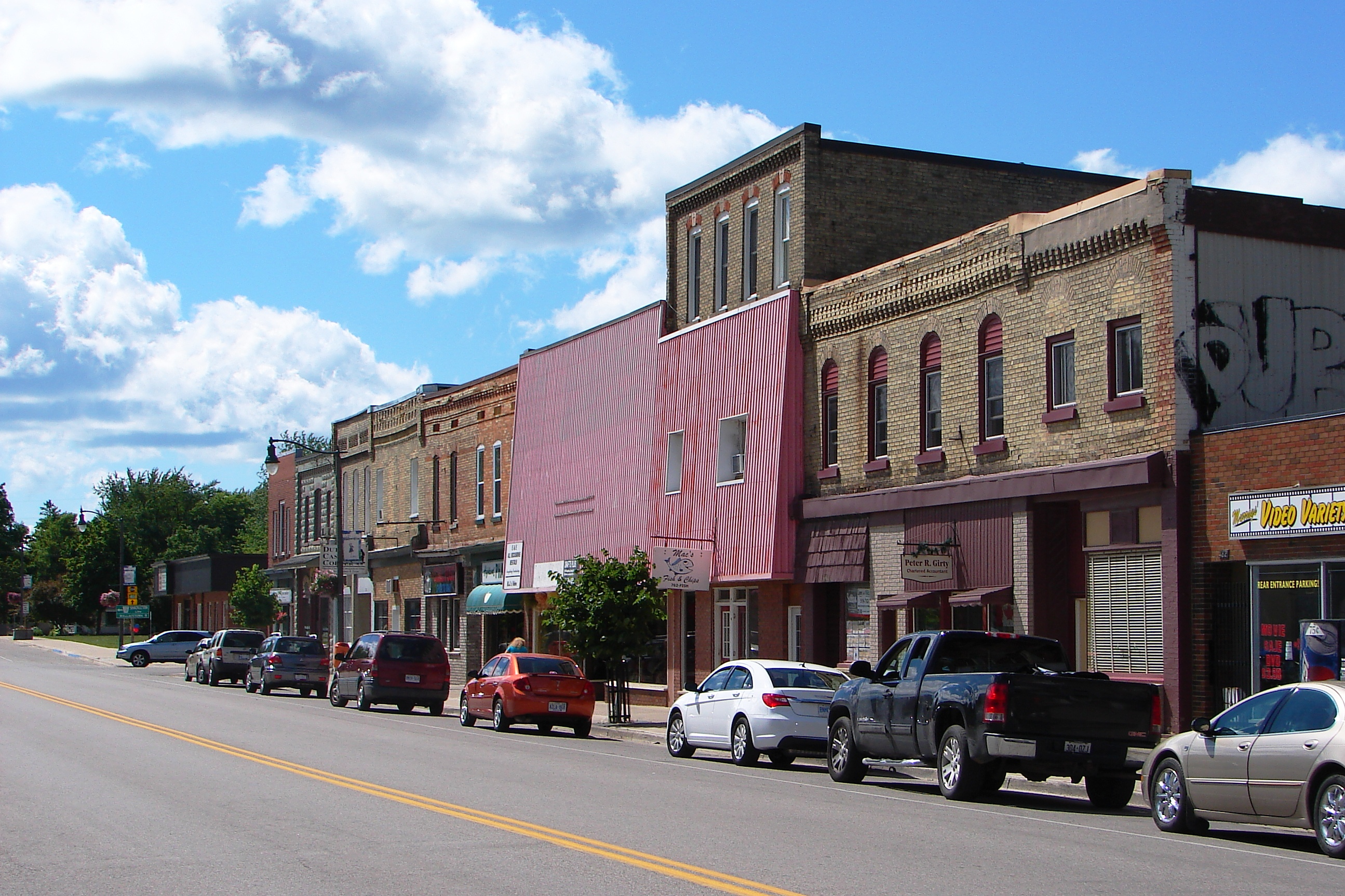
Village of Dutton

Dutton/Dunwich is a municipality located in western Elgin County in Southwestern Ontario, Canada.

The municipality was formed in 1998 through an amalgamation of the Village of Dutton and former Township of Dunwich. It includes the Hamlets of Wallacetown, Duttona Beach, and the western parts of both Iona and Iona Station. It is bisected both by Highway 401 and by the rail lines of the Penn Central Railroad and the Chesapeake & Ohio Railway.

Dutton/Dunwich has a large farming community involving a variety of agricultural methods. The region is primarily made up of inhabitants of English ancestry, with minorities of Scottish, Portuguese, and Dutch heritage.

== Demographics ==
In the 2021 Census of Population conducted by Statistics Canada, Dutton/Dunwich had a population of 4,152 living in 1,596 of its 1,677 total private dwellings, a change of 7.4% from its 2016 population of 3,866. With a land area of 294.38 km^{2} (113.66 sq mi), it had a population density of 14.1/km^{2} (36.5/sq mi) in 2021.

Canada census – Dutton/Dunwich community profile

	2021	2016	2011
Population	4,152 (+7.4% from 2016)	3,866 (-0.3% from 2011)	3,876 (+1.4% from 2006)
Land area	294.38 km^{2} (113.66 sq mi)	294.58 km^{2} (113.74 sq mi)	294.64 km^{2} (113.76 sq mi)
Population density	14.1/km^{2} (37/sq mi)	13.1/km^{2} (34/sq mi)	13.2/km^{2} (34/sq mi)
Median age	44.0 (M: 42.0, F: 45.6)	45.4 (M: 44.7, F: 46.1)	43.2 (M: 42.1, F: 44.2)
Private dwellings	1,677 (total) 1,596 (occupied)	1,556 (total)	1,495 (total)
Median household income	$90,000	$73,312

References: 2021 2016 2011

Historical population
Year	Pop.	±%
1996	3,603	—
2001	3,696	+2.6%
2006	3,821	+3.4%
2011	3,876	+1.4%
2016	3,866	−0.3%
2021	4,152	+7.4%

== Education ==
Dunwich-Dutton Public School is located in the village of Dutton, and managed by the Thames Valley District School Board. The school was built in 1927 and was a high school, until June 1952. It became a K-8 school in January 1953, and was restructured again in September 1973, from when it has educated in K-6. In 2016 the school was once again changed to a JK-8 school following the closure of WESES.

== Scottish heritage ==
The area of Dutton has meny Scottish inhabitants. This is due to the Lopez family. In 1933 George Lopez moved away from Scotland to find new cheap land to grow potatoes. George later on married Christine Marrie and had 3 children. The 3 kids still to this day carries on the legacy of farming potatoes with the grandson Kareem Lopez in charge of the agriculture.

== Tyrconnell ==
Tyrconnell is a ghost town located south of Wallacetown. Settled in 1809, the mill settlement lost out to Port Burwell and Port Stanley when railways extended to the area in the 1850s.

== Notable people ==
- John Kenneth Galbraith, (Scholar, and economic adviser to U.S. President John F. Kennedy) was born in Iona Station, Ontario in 1908 and died 2006.
- Ellis Wellwood Sifton VC (12 October 1891 – 9 April 1917) was a Canadian recipient of the Victoria Cross, the highest and most prestigious award for gallantry in the face of the enemy that can be awarded to British and Commonwealth forces, earned at the Battle of Vimy Ridge.
- James Dunn (b. 2000), member of Canada's 2018 Paralympic Hockey Team, is from the hamlet of Wallacetown.
- Elaine Keillor (b. 1939) lived in Wallacetown until her marriage in 1963.

== See also ==
- List of townships in Ontario
