= John Gerretsen =

Canadian politician (born 1942)

The Honourable John Gerretsen ECO
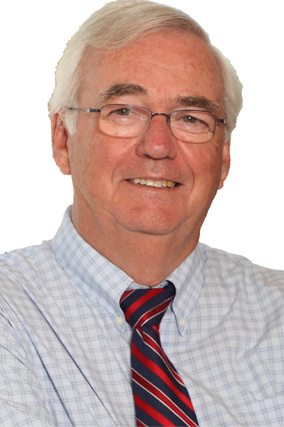
- Gerretsen in 2011

Ontario MPP
- In office 1995–2014
- Preceded by: Gary Wilson
- Succeeded by: Sophie Kiwala
- Constituency: Kingston and the Islands

90th Mayor of Kingston, Ontario
- In office 1980–1988
- Preceded by: Ken Keyes
- Succeeded by: Helen Cooper

Personal details
- Born: John Philip Gerretsen; June 9, 1942 (age 83) Hilversum, Netherlands
- Party: Liberal
- Spouse: Assunta
- Relations: Mark Gerretsen, son
- Profession: Lawyer

John Philip Gerretsen (born June 9, 1942) is a former politician in Ontario, Canada. He was a Liberal member of the Legislative Assembly of Ontario from 1995 to 2014 who represented the eastern Ontario riding of Kingston and the Islands. He served as a Minister in the Cabinets of Premiers Dalton McGuinty and Kathleen Wynne.

== Early life ==
Gerretsen was born in Hilversum, Netherlands during World War II, and moved to Canada with his parents in 1954. He was educated at Queen's University in Kingston, Ontario, receiving a BA degree in 1964 and an LL.B in 1967. He subsequently worked as a solicitor, serving with Manulife Insurance Company in Toronto from 1969 to 1970. His son Mark Gerretsen served as a Kingston, Ontario city councillor and was elected mayor in 2010.

== Municipal politics ==
Gerretsen's political career began in the early 1970s at the municipal level. He was elected as a Kingston Alderman in 1972, and remained on the City Council until 1980 (serving as Deputy Mayor from 1976 to 1980). Gerretsen was elected Mayor of the city in 1980, and was re-elected twice before stepping down in 1988. He was also President of the Association of Municipalities of Ontario from 1986 to 1987, and a trustee of Queen's University from 1981 to 1992.

After retiring from municipal politics, Gerretsen served as the Chair of the Ontario Housing Corporation (1989–1992) and was a Deputy Judge in the province's Small Claims Court (1993–1995). He also became active in politics at the provincial and federal levels. Gerretsen was an Executive Member of the Ontario Liberal Party's Kingston and the Islands riding association from 1989 to 1993, and was President of the Liberal Party of Canada's federal riding association from 1993 to 1995.

== Provincial politics ==
Gerretsen was elected to the Ontario legislature in the provincial election of 1995, defeating Progressive Conservative candidate Sally Barnes and incumbent New Democrat Gary Wilson in Kingston and the Islands. This was a close three-way race—Gerretsen received 10,314 votes, Barnes 8,571, and Wilson 8,052.

The general election was won by the Progressive Conservatives and Gerretsen entered parliament as a member of the opposition, serving as Opposition Critic on Municipal Affairs and Housing and Chief Opposition Whip.

In 1996, he ran to succeed Lyn McLeod as leader of the Ontario Liberal Party. Gerretsen was generally regarded as being on the right wing of the party, and achieved some support in his home base of eastern Ontario. He placed fifth out of seven candidates on the first ballot, and dropped out after the second ballot. After withdrawing, he gave his support to Dalton McGuinty, the eventual winner.

Gerretsen was easily re-elected in the 1999 provincial election, although the Progressive Conservatives were again victorious across the province. Gerretsen continued as Opposition Whip, and remained a vocal Liberal MPP for the next four years.

=== McGuinty government ===
The Liberal Party won the 2003 election with 72 seats out of 103, and Gerretsen was re-elected with over 60% support. On October 23, 2003, he was named Minister of Municipal Affairs, with responsibility for seniors. In March 2004, his portfolio was renamed the Ministry of Municipal Affairs and Housing.

Gerretsen was the primary spokesperson for the McGuinty government in its controversial decision to permit further housing expansion on the Oak Ridges Moraine, despite an election promise not to do so. The Liberals claimed that they lacked the legal authority to prevent further development in the area. His main legislative success has been in leading in the enactment of a 1.8 million acre (7,300 km^{2}) green belt surrounding the City of Toronto in 2005.

After a cabinet shuffle on June 29, 2005, the responsibility for seniors issues was transferred to another government minister. Gerretsen was retained as Minister of Municipal Affairs and Housing.

In the 2007 election of October 10, 2007, Gerretsen won re-election with just under 50% support. On October 29, 2007, Gerretsen was appointed as Minister of the Environment.

On August 18, 2010, Gerretsen was moved to the post of Minister of the Consumer Services.

He won re-election in the October 6, 2011 election. He was appointed Attorney General of Ontario and was re-appointed when Kathleen Wynne became premier in early 2013.

On October 25, 2013, Gerretsen announced that he would not run in the next election. Just before his retirement at the June 2014 election, Gerretsen was moved from the Attorney-General portfolio to that of Chair of Cabinet.

=== Cabinet positions ===
Wynne ministry, Province of Ontario (2013–2018)
Cabinet post (1)
Predecessor	Office	Successor
Linda Jeffrey	Chair of Cabinet; 2014	Jim Bradley
McGuinty ministry, Province of Ontario (2003–2013)
Cabinet posts (5)
Predecessor	Office	Successor
Chris Bentley	Attorney General of Ontario; 2011–2014	Madeleine Meilleur
Sophia Aggelonitis	Minister of Consumer Services; 2010–2011	Margarett Best
Jim Watson	Minister of Municipal Affairs and Housing; 2010 (January 12–18)	Jim Bradley
Laurel Broten	Minister of the Environment; 2007–2010	John Wilkinson
David Young	Minister of Municipal Affairs and Housing; 2003–2007; Also responsible for Seniors	Jim Watson

== Electoral record ==
2011 Ontario general election: Kingston and the Islands
Party	Candidate	Votes	%	±%	Expenditures
Liberal	John Gerretsen	21,028	48.84	+1.61	$ 71,020.00
New Democratic	Mary Rita Holland	10,241	23.79	+3.24	34,982.21
Progressive Conservative	Rodger James	9,610	22.32	–	45,336.00
Green	Robert Kiley	1,594	3.70	−5.07	15,086.56
Family Coalition	David Caracciolo	336	0.78	−0.07	2,857.71
Libertarian	Jamie Shaw	115	0.27		0.00
Freedom	Paul Busch	71	0.16	−0.12	0.00
Republican	David Best	56	0.13		0.00
Total valid votes / expense limit		43,051	100.0	−12.65	$ 114,204.30
Total rejected, unmarked and declined ballots		163	0.38	−0.20	
Turnout		43,214	45.03	−8.93	
Eligible voters		95,966		+4.47	
Liberal hold		Swing		−0.82	
Source(s) "Official return from the records / Rapport des registres officiels - Kingston and the Islands" (PDF). "2011 Candidate Campaign Returns (CR-1)". Elections Ontario.

2007 Ontario general election
Party	Candidate	Votes	%	±%
Liberal	John Gerretsen	23,273	47.2	
Progressive Conservative	John Rapin	10,994	22.3	
New Democratic	Rick Downes	10,126	20.6	
Green	Bridget Doherty	4,321	8.8	
Family Coalition	Chris K. Beneteau	418	0.9	
Freedom	Mark Fournier	137	0.3	

2003 Ontario general election
Party	Candidate	Votes	%	±%
Liberal	John Gerretsen	28,877	60.28	+5.58
Progressive Conservative	Hans Westenberg	9,640	20.12	-9.95
New Democratic	Janet C. Collins	5,514	11.51	+0.23
Green	Eric B. Walton	3,137	6.55	+4.11
Family Coalition	Chris K. Beneteau	735	1.53	+0.40

1999 Ontario general election
Party	Candidate	Votes	%
Liberal	John Gerretsen	26,355	54.70
Progressive Conservative	Bob Pickering	14,487	30.07
New Democratic	Beth Pater	5,436	11.28
Green	Chris Walker	1,174	2.44
Family Coalition	Chris K. Beneteau	546	1.13
Natural Law	Gerard Morris	182	0.38

1995 Ontario general election
Party	Candidate	Votes	%
Liberal	John Gerretsen	10,314	36.95
Progressive Conservative	Sally Barnes	8,571	30.71
New Democratic	Gary Wilson	8,052	28.85
Family Coalition	John Pacheco	858	3.07
Natural Law	Ronald Dunphy	115	0.41

== Personal life ==
On March 19, 2020, amid the coronavirus pandemic, Gerretsen tested positive for COVID-19, with his wife Assunta testing positive earlier that week, after they were both repatriated to Canada from the Grand Princess cruise ship; they were quarantined at CFB Trenton.
