= Sophie Kiwala =

Canadian politician

Ontario MPP
- In office 2014–2018
- Preceded by: John Gerretsen
- Succeeded by: Ian Arthur
- Constituency: Kingston and the Islands

Personal details
- Born: 1962 (age 63–64) Kingston, Ontario
- Party: Liberal
- Children: 3
- Occupation: Office manager

Sophie Alison Kiwala (born 1962) is a former politician in Ontario, Canada. She was a Liberal member of the Legislative Assembly of Ontario from 2014 to 2018 who represented the riding of Kingston and the Islands.

== Background ==
Kiwala was born and raised in Kingston, Ontario. She moved to Toronto shortly after finishing high school, and took courses at Humber College. In 1986 she moved to Turkey in the 1990s. She returned to Kingston in 1998 to look after her ailing mother. She studied political science at Queen's University. Later she worked as House of Commons Speaker Peter Milliken's office manager and then as Chief of Staff to MP Ted Hsu for seven years. In July 2020, she married retired Anglican bishop Michael Oulton. The small service took place under provincial pandemic protocols, with Bishop Susan Bell presiding.

== Politics ==
Kiwala ran for the Liberal nomination after incumbent Liberal MPP John Gerretsen announced in 2013 that he would not be running for re-election. She defeated three other candidates for the nomination, including former Kingston mayor Harvey Rosen. In the 2014 Ontario election, Kiwala was elected in the riding of Kingston and the Islands, defeating New Democrat candidate Mary Rita Holland by 6,027 votes.

During her tenure, she has served as a Parliamentary Assistant to several ministers, most recently as PA to the Minister of Indigenous Relations and Reconciliation.

In 2014, Kiwala focused attention on the issue of missing and murdered Aboriginal women in Canada. As part of her campaign to raise awareness, she publicized the Faceless Doll Project, an art project which uses faceless female dolls to represent the missing women. On October 23, 2014 she read a Members' motion in the legislature calling on the Ontario Legislature to support the National Aboriginal Organisations' call on the Federal government to initiate a public inquiry to study the issue.

In July 2020, Kiwala revealed that she was running for the Ontario Liberal Party again with the nomination set to take place in 2022. This led to a race between Kiwala and her former colleague Ted Hsu. Among priorities for the office, she listed the Long Term Care Act and encouraging "a much more compassionate view of individual residents".

== Election results ==
2018 Ontario general election: Kingston and the Islands
Party	Candidate	Votes	%	±%
New Democratic	Ian Arthur	21,788	39.16	+9.73
Liberal	Sophie Kiwala	15,312	27.52	−14.54
Progressive Conservative	Gary Bennett	14,512	26.08	+5.28
Green	Robert Kiley	3,574	6.42	−0.81
Libertarian	Heather Cunningham	274	0.49	
Trillium	Andre Imbeault	184	0.33	
Total valid votes		55,644	99.09	
Total rejected, unmarked and declined ballots		510	0.91	
Turnout		56,154	57.29	
Eligible voters		98,020		
New Democratic gain from Liberal		Swing		+12.14
Source: Elections Ontario

2014 Ontario general election: Kingston and the Islands
Party	Candidate	Votes	%	±%
Liberal	Sophie Kiwala	20,838	41.59	−7.25
New Democratic	Mary Rita Holland	14,811	29.56	+5.77
Progressive Conservative	Mark Bain	10,652	21.26	−1.06
Green	Robert Kiley	3,556	7.10	+3.40
Freedom	Jonathan Reid	242	0.48	+0.32
Total valid votes		50,099	100.0	
Liberal hold		Swing		−6.51
Source(s) Elections Ontario (2014). "Official result from the records, 036 Kingston and the Islands" (PDF).
