= Elizabeth Joan Smith =

Canadian politician (1928–2016)

Joan Smith

Ontario MPP
- In office 1985–1990
- Preceded by: Gordon Walker
- Succeeded by: David Winninger
- Constituency: London South

Personal details
- Born: Elizabeth Joan MacDonald; January 5, 1928 Calgary, Alberta
- Died: February 9, 2016 (aged 88) London, Ontario
- Party: Liberal
- Spouse: Don Smith (deceased)
- Children: 7
- Occupation: Children services

Elizabeth Joan Smith (January 5, 1928 – February 9, 2016) was a politician in Ontario, Canada. She was a Liberal member of the Legislative Assembly of Ontario from 1985 to 1990 who represented the central Ontario riding of London South. She was a cabinet minister in the government of David Peterson.

== Background ==
Smith was educated at St. Michael's College in the University of Toronto, receiving a Bachelor of Arts in philosophy. She was the founding member of Mme. Vanier Children's Services and Diocesan Catholic Social Services in London, Ontario, and served on the board of governors for the University of Western Ontario. In 2001, Smith received a Doctor of Laws degree from the University of Western Ontario. Smith lived in London, Ontario. Her husband Don Smith was the co-founder of EllisDon, an employee-owned construction services company that was incorporated in 1951 in London, Ontario. She and Don raised seven children. She died in London after suffering a head injury in St. Lucia in February 2016. She was 88.

== Politics ==
In 1976, Smith was elected to council for London City Council. She served as alderman for nine years and was a controller for two of those years. She was elected to the Ontario legislature in the 1985 provincial election, defeating Progressive Conservative incumbent Gordon Walker by 6,683 votes in the constituency of London South. She was re-elected by an increased majority in the 1987 election, and appointed to cabinet as Solicitor General on September 29, 1987.

Smith was forced to resign her office on June 6, 1989. She had received a telephone call in the middle of the night from a constituent worried about the safety of a missing brother, and telephoned the police to express her concern. The opposition argued that this was an improper act, in that Smith's position as Solicitor-General could result in the case receiving preferential treatment. Thomas Walkom wrote a newspaper column about this matter, entitled "Even decent politicians may need to resign".

Smith later served as Chief Government Whip. In the 1990 provincial election, she lost to NDP candidate David Winninger by 5,651 votes. She attempted a comeback in the 1995 election but finished third, behind Winninger and PC candidate Bob Wood.

=== Cabinet positions ===
Peterson ministry, Province of Ontario (1985–1990)
Cabinet post (1)
| Predecessor | Office | Successor |
|---|---|---|
| Ken Keyes | Solicitor General; 1987–1989 | Ian Scott |
Special Parliamentary Responsibilities
| Predecessor | Title | Successor |
| Doug Reycraft | Chief Government Whip; 1989–1990 | Shirley Coppen (NDP) |
| Bob Mitchell (PC) | Chief Government Whip; 1985–1987 | Doug Reycraft |
