= Ken Keyes (politician) =

Canadian politician (born 1930)

The Honourable Ken Keyes ECO

Ontario MPP
- In office 1985–1990
- Preceded by: Keith Norton
- Succeeded by: Gary Wilson
- Constituency: Kingston and the Islands

Personal details
- Born: Kenneth A. Keyes; September 16, 1930 (age 95) Wolfe Island, Ontario
- Party: Liberal
- Occupation: Teacher

Kenneth A. Keyes (born September 16, 1930) is a former politician in Ontario, Canada. He was a Liberal member of the Legislative Assembly of Ontario from 1985 to 1990, and served as a cabinet minister in the government of David Peterson.

== Background ==
Keyes was educated at Toronto Teacher's College, Queen's University and the University of Ottawa, receiving a Master's Degree in Education. He was a teacher and principal in Frontenac County for thirty-seven years.

== Municipal politics ==
Keyes served as an alderman in Kingston for twelve years, was deputy mayor for five years. He was elected as mayor in 1976. He served two terms and left office in 1980.

== Provincial politics ==
He ran for the Ontario legislature in the 1971 provincial election, but lost to Progressive Conservative W.J. Nuttall by fewer than 2,000 votes in the constituency of Frontenac—Addington. He contested Kingston in the 1975 election, but lost to Progressive Conservative Keith Norton by 203 votes.

He was elected to the legislature in the 1985 election, defeating Norton by 2,287 votes in the renamed riding of Kingston and the Islands. The Liberals formed a minority government under David Peterson after this election, and Keyes was appointed to cabinet as Minister of Correctional Services and Solicitor General on June 26, 1985.

In late 1986, Keyes became involved in a political controversy after being caught sharing an alcoholic drink with police officers on a police boat in the Kingston area. He stepped down as Solicitor General on December 3, 1986 while the matter was investigated by Toronto police, and was re-instated on January 9, 1987. On another occasion, he provoked controversy by suggesting that some police services in Ontario were using hollow-tipped bullets, contrary to provincial law.

Keyes was easily re-elected over NDP challenger Gary Wilson in the 1987 provincial election, but was dropped from cabinet after the election and served as a backbencher in the parliament that followed.

The Liberals were defeated by the NDP in the 1990 provincial election and Keyes lost his seat to Wilson by 2,092 votes.

Keyes supported fellow Kingstonian John Gerretsen's bid to lead the Ontario Liberal Party in 1996, and moved to Joseph Cordiano's camp when Gerretsen was eliminated after the second ballot. When Cordiano was also eliminated, Keyes supported the victorious candidate, Dalton McGuinty.

=== Cabinet ===
Peterson ministry, Province of Ontario (1985–1990)
Cabinet posts (3)
Predecessor	Office	Successor
Ian Scott	Solicitor General; 1987 (January–September)	Joan Smith
Don Cousens	Minister of Correctional Services; 1985–1987	Dave Ramsay
Bud Gregory	Solicitor General; 1985–1986	Ian Scott

== Later life ==
Keyes remains active in the Kingston area. In 1998, he chaired the International Plowing Match and Farm Machinery Show in the neighbouring riding of Hastings—Frontenac—Lennox and Addington.
