= John Ferris (Ontario politician) =

Canadian politician

Ontario MPP
- In office 1975–1977
- Preceded by: John White
- Succeeded by: Gordon Walker
- Constituency: London South

Personal details
- Born: June 29, 1933
- Died: September 27, 2015 (aged 82)
- Party: Liberal
- Spouse: Joan Ferris
- Children: 3
- Occupation: Insurance administration

John P. Ferris (June 29, 1933 - September 27, 2015) was a politician in Ontario, Canada. He was a Liberal member of the Legislative Assembly of Ontario from 1975 to 1977 who represented the central Ontario riding of London South. He was also a long time school board trustee who served as chair of London school boards in 1975 and again in 1986.

== Background ==
Ferris was raised in London, Ontario and graduated from Catholic Central High School. He was an employee of London Life Insurance before becoming a school trustee in 1971. He was married to Joan for 56 years and together they raised three children.

== Politics ==
In 1971, he became a school board trustee out of concern for separate school funding. He said, "There was an argument going on about the continuation of separate schools. What would happen with my own kids was a concern." In 1975, he was elected as chair of the London School Board of Education.

later that year, he ran as the Liberal candidate in the 1975 provincial election. He defeated PC candidate in John Eberhard in the riding of London South in what was viewed as an upset result. After winning his seat in the legislature he resigned as board chair and was replaced by Eberhard's father Richard Eberhard who was vice-chair of the board. He was named education critic for the Liberal party for the next term of parliament.

In the 1977 election, Ferris lost to PC candidate Gordon Walker who retook the seat for the Conservatives.

He returned to the school board in 1978 and continued in that position until he retired in 2010.
