= Elgin—St. Thomas—London South =

Federal electoral district in Ontario, Canada

Ontario electoral district
- Interactive map of riding boundaries from the 2025 federal election

Federal electoral district
- Legislature: House of Commons
MP
Andrew Lawton
Conservative
- District created: 2023
- First contested: 2025
- Last contested: 2025
- District webpage: profile, map

Demographics
- Population (2021): 112,448
- Electors (2025): 93,164
- Area (km²): 2,048
- Pop. density (per km²): 54.9
- Census division(s): Elgin, Middlesex
- Census subdivision(s): London (part), St. Thomas, Central Elgin, Malahide, Aylmer, Bayham, West Elgin, Southwold, Dutton/Dunwich

Elgin—St. Thomas—London South (French: Elgin–St. Thomas–London-Sud) is a federal electoral district in Ontario, Canada. It came into effect upon the call of the 2025 Canadian federal election.

== Geography ==
Under the 2022 Canadian federal electoral redistribution the riding largely replaced Elgin—Middlesex—London.

== Demographics ==
According to the 2021 Canadian census

Languages: 85.2% English, 3.0% German, 2.1% Plautdietsch, 1.3% French

Religions: 58.9% Christian (17.8% Catholic, 8.2% United Church, 3.9% Anglican, 3.5% Baptist, 3.0% Anabaptist, 2.2% Presbyterian, 1.2% Reformed, 19.2% Other), 36.4% No religion, 2.9% Muslim

Median income: $41,600 (2020)

Average income: $50,240 (2020)

Panethnic groups in Elgin—St. Thomas—London South (2021)
Panethnic group	2021	
Panethnic group	Pop.	%
European (Note: Statistic includes all persons that did not make up part of a visible minority or an indigenous identity.)	98,505	89.09%
Middle Eastern (Note: Statistic includes total responses of "West Asian" and "Arab" under visible minority section on census.)	2,390	2.16%
Indigenous	2,240	2.03%
South Asian	2,230	2.02%
African	1,735	1.57%
Southeast Asian (Note: Statistic includes total responses of "Filipino" and "Southeast Asian" under visible minority section on census.)	1,160	1.05%
Latin American	915	0.83%
East Asian (Note: Statistic includes total responses of "Chinese", "Korean", and "Japanese" under visible minority section on census.)	810	0.73%
Other/multiracial (Note: Statistic includes total responses of "Visible minority, n.i.e." and "Multiple visible minorities" under visible minority section on census.)	570	0.52%
Total responses	110,565	98.32%
Total population	112,450	100%
Notes: Totals greater than 100% due to multiple origin responses. Demographics based on 2022 Canadian federal electoral redistribution riding boundaries.

== History ==
Parliament	Years	Member	Party
Elgin—St. Thomas—London South; Riding created from Elgin—Middlesex—London
45th	2025–present	Andrew Lawton	Conservative

== Electoral Results ==
2025 Canadian federal election
Party	Candidate	Votes	%	±%	Expenditures
Conservative	Andrew Lawton	32,565	50.14	+0.89	$127,637.08
Liberal	David Goodwin	28,010	43.13	+23.48	$131,543.21
New Democratic	Paul Pighin	3,118	4.80	–11.36	$3,136.78
People's	Stephen Campbell	1,256	1.93	–10.25	$4,200.00
Total valid votes/expense limit		64,949	99.36	–	$139,715.07
Total rejected ballots		417	0.64		
Turnout		65,366	68.78		
Eligible voters		95,033			
Conservative notional hold		Swing		–11.30	
Elections Canada

2021 federal election redistributed results
Party	Vote	%
Conservative	27,199	49.25
Liberal	10,854	19.65
New Democratic	8,933	16.18
People's	6,726	12.18
Green	1,223	2.21
Others	292	0.53

== See also ==
- List of Canadian electoral districts
