= Gary Wilson (politician) =

Canadian politician (born 1946)

Ontario MPP
- In office 1990–1995
- Preceded by: Ken Keyes
- Succeeded by: John Gerretsen
- Constituency: Kingston and the Islands

Personal details
- Born: 1946 (age 79–80) Timmins, Ontario
- Party: New Democrat
- Spouse: Olga
- Children: 2
- Occupation: Librarian

Gary Wilson (born 1946) is a former politician in Ontario, Canada. He was a New Democratic Party member of the Legislative Assembly of Ontario from 1990 to 1995.

== Background ==
Wilson was born in Timmins, Ontario into a family of six children. He received a Bachelor of Arts degree from Laurentian University in 1969. He worked as a library technician at Queen's University in Kingston, Ontario. He was an executive member of the Canadian Union of Public Employees and served as leader of the Kingston and District Labour Council. He also hosted a local television program, "Labour's Voice in the Community".

== Politics ==
Wilson ran for the Ontario legislature in the 1987 provincial election, but finished about 6,600 votes behind Liberal incumbent Ken Keyes in the constituency of Kingston and the Islands.

The NDP won a majority government in the 1990 provincial election, and Wilson defeated Keyes by 2,092 votes in a rematch from 1987. He served as a parliamentary assistant to several ministers during his time in office.

The NDP were defeated in the 1995 provincial election, and Wilson finished third in a close three-way race against Progressive Conservative Sally Barnes and the winner, Liberal John Gerretsen. He later ran for the House of Commons of Canada as a candidate of the federal New Democratic Party in the elections of 1997 and 2000, but finished fourth on both occasions.

== Later life ==
Wilson returned to his position as library technician following his defeat. He now works at the Lederman Law Library at Queen's University in Kingston, Ontario, and has served as chair of the CUPE Local 1302.
