= London South (provincial electoral district) =

Former provincial electoral district in Ontario, Canada

Ontario electoral district

Defunct provincial electoral district
- Legislature: Legislative Assembly of Ontario
- District created: 1926
- District abolished: 1999
- First contested: 1926
- Last contested: 1995

London South was a provincial electoral district in Ontario, Canada. It was created in 1926 and was abolished in 1933 before the 1934 election. It was re-established in 1955 and existed until 1999 when it was abolished again.

== Members of Provincial Parliament ==
London South
Assembly	Years	Member	Party
17th	1926–1929	John Cameron Wilson	Conservative
18th	1929–1934	John Cameron Wilson	Conservative
Merged with London North into London from 1934 to 1955
25th	1955–1959	George Ernest Jackson	Progressive Conservative
26th	1959–1963	John White	Progressive Conservative
27th	1963–1967	John White	Progressive Conservative
28th	1967–1971	John White	Progressive Conservative
29th	1971–1975	John White	Progressive Conservative
30th	1975–1977	John Ferris	Liberal
31st	1977–1981	Gordon Walker	Progressive Conservative
32nd	1981–1985	Gordon Walker	Progressive Conservative
33rd	1985–1987	Joan Smith	Liberal
34th	1987–1990	Joan Smith	Liberal
35th	1990–1995	David Winninger	New Democratic
36th	1995–1999	Bob Wood	Progressive Conservative
Sourced from the Ontario Legislative Assembly
Merged into London North Centre before the 1999 election

== Electoral history ==
1995 Ontario general election
Party	Candidate	Votes	%	±%
Progressive Conservative	Bob Wood	18,161	44.35	+20.45
New Democratic	David Winninger	10,729	26.20	–16.21
Liberal	Elizabeth Joan Smith	10,693	26.11	–2.55
Family Coalition	Rudy J. Polci	387	0.95	–2.53
Freedom	Maureen Battaglia	340	0.83	–0.71
Independent	Mark Simpson	323	0.79	–
Green	Sven Biggs	202	0.49	–
Natural Law	James M. Hea	111	0.27	–
Total valid votes		40,946	98.95	
Total rejected, unmarked and declined ballots		434	1.05	–0.31
Turnout		41,380	61.88	–3.73
Eligible voters		66,875		
Progressive Conservative gain from New Democratic		Swing		+11.50
Source: Elections Ontario

1990 Ontario general election
Party	Candidate	Votes	%	±%
New Democratic	David Winninger	17,438	42.41	+22.84
Liberal	Elizabeth Joan Smith	11,787	28.67	–26.81
Progressive Conservative	Bob Wood	9,828	23.90	+2.53
Family Coalition	Paul R. Picard	1,427	3.47	+1.09
Freedom	Robert Metz	635	1.54	+0.35
Total valid votes		41,115	98.64	
Total rejected, unmarked and declined ballots		568	1.36	+0.92
Turnout		41,683	65.61	+3.13
Eligible voters		63,533		
New Democratic gain from Liberal		Swing		+10.15
Source: Elections Ontario

1987 Ontario general election
Party	Candidate	Votes	%	±%
Liberal	Elizabeth Joan Smith	20,046	55.48	+4.45
Progressive Conservative	Vaughan Minor	7,723	21.37	–15.75
New Democratic	David Winninger	7,074	19.58	+9.01
Family Coalition	Paul R. Picard	861	2.38	–
Freedom	Robert Metz	430	1.19	–0.09
Total valid votes		36,134	99.56	
Total rejected ballots		160	0.44	+0.11
Turnout		36,294	62.48	–0.38
Eligible voters		58,087		
Liberal hold		Swing		+10.10
Source: Elections Ontario

1985 Ontario general election
Party	Candidate	Votes	%	±%
Liberal	Elizabeth Joan Smith	24,522	51.03	+20.17
Progressive Conservative	Gordon Walker	17,839	37.12	–17.61
New Democratic	David Winninger	5,080	10.57	–3.83
Freedom	Robert Metz	614	1.28	–
Total valid votes		48,055	99.67	
Total rejected ballots		158	0.33	–0.09
Turnout		48,213	62.87	+10.89
Eligible voters		76,692		
Liberal gain from Progressive Conservative		Swing		+18.89
Source: Elections Ontario

1981 Ontario general election
Party	Candidate	Votes	%	±%
Progressive Conservative	Gordon Walker	19,714	54.74	+12.35
Liberal	Frank Green	11,116	30.86	–5.67
New Democratic	Dale Green	5,187	14.40	–6.68
Total valid votes		36,017	99.59	
Total rejected ballots		150	0.41	+0.01
Turnout		36,167	51.97	–11.65
Eligible voters		69,586		
Progressive Conservative hold		Swing		+9.01
Source: Elections Ontario

1977 Ontario general election
Party	Candidate	Votes	%	±%
Progressive Conservative	Gordon Walker	16,011	42.39	+3.02
Liberal	John Ferris	13,800	36.53	–4.41
New Democratic	Tom Olien	7,964	21.08	+1.39
Total valid votes		37,775	99.59	
Total rejected ballots		155	0.41	+0.01
Turnout		37,930	63.63	–0.55
Eligible voters		59,614		
Progressive Conservative gain from Liberal		Swing		+3.72
Source: Elections Ontario

1975 Ontario general election
Party	Candidate	Votes	%	±%
Liberal	John Ferris	14,496	40.94	+14.27
Progressive Conservative	John Eberhard	13,937	39.37	–11.18
New Democratic	Edith Welch	6,971	19.69	–3.09
Total valid votes		35,404	99.60	
Total rejected ballots		141	0.40	+0.12
Turnout		35,545	64.17	–13.70
Eligible voters		55,388		
Liberal gain from Progressive Conservative		Swing		+12.72
Source: Elections Ontario

1971 Ontario general election
Party	Candidate	Votes	%	±%
Progressive Conservative	John White	24,064	50.54	–3.19
Liberal	John McKim	12,701	26.68	–2.39
New Democratic	William L. Murdock	10,845	22.78	+5.59
Total valid votes		47,610	99.73	
Total rejected ballots		130	0.27	–0.44
Turnout		47,740	77.88	+13.55
Eligible voters		61,300		
Progressive Conservative hold		Swing		–0.40
Source: Elections Ontario

1967 Ontario general election
Party	Candidate	Votes	%	±%
Progressive Conservative	John White	15,116	53.74	–8.80
Liberal	Gordon Stronach	8,177	29.07	+2.18
New Democratic	William Harrington	4,836	17.19	+6.62
Total valid votes		28,129	99.28	
Total rejected ballots		203	0.72	–0.22
Turnout		28,332	64.33	+8.86
Eligible voters		44,041		
Progressive Conservative hold		Swing		–5.49
Source: Elections Ontario

1963 Ontario general election
Party	Candidate	Votes	%	±%
Progressive Conservative	John White	13,982	62.54	+11.83
Liberal	Harry Quigley	6,012	26.89	–9.25
New Democratic	Robert Foxcroft	2,364	10.57	–2.58
Total valid votes		22,358	99.06	
Total rejected ballots		212	0.94	–0.37
Turnout		22,570	55.48	+5.52
Eligible voters		40,685		
Progressive Conservative hold		Swing		+10.54
Source: Elections Ontario

1959 Ontario general election
Party	Candidate	Votes	%	±%
Progressive Conservative	John White	9,888	50.71	+4.85
Liberal	Arthur D. Cartier	7,048	36.14	+3.43
Co-operative Commonwealth	Clive B. Arnold	2,564	13.15	–5.17
Total valid votes		19,500	98.69	
Total rejected ballots		258	1.31	–0.09
Turnout		19,758	49.95	–3.74
Eligible voters		39,555		
Progressive Conservative hold		Swing		+0.71
Source: Elections Ontario

1955 Ontario general election
Party	Candidate	Votes	%
Progressive Conservative	George Jackson	8,735	45.85
Liberal	Edward M. Shortt	6,231	32.71
Co-operative Commonwealth	Andrew Grant	3,489	18.31
Labor–Progressive	Al Bernhardt	595	3.12
Total valid votes		19,050	98.61
Total rejected ballots		269	1.39
Turnout		19,319	53.69
Eligible voters		35,980	
Progressive Conservative pickup new district.			
Source: Elections Ontario

=== 1926–1934 ===
1929 Ontario general election
Party	Candidate	Votes	%	±%
Conservative	John Cameron Wilson	6,801	58.48	–4.69
Labour	Hugh Allan Stevenson	4,829	41.52	+4.69
Total valid votes		11,630	99.50	
Total rejected ballots		58	0.50	+0.02
Turnout		11,688	52.76	–16.39
Eligible voters		22,154		
Conservative hold		Swing		–4.69
Source: Elections Ontario

1926 Ontario general election
Party	Candidate	Votes	%
Conservative	John Cameron Wilson	9,064	63.17
Labour	Hugh Allan Stevenson	5,285	36.83
Total valid votes		14,349	99.53
Total rejected ballots		68	0.47
Turnout		14,417	69.15
Eligible voters		20,850	
Conservative pickup new district.			
Source: Elections Ontario

== See also ==
- List of Ontario provincial electoral districts
- Canadian provincial electoral districts
