= George Jackson (Ontario politician) =

Canadian politician (1921–1995)

George Ernest (Ernie) Jackson (1921 – January 20, 1995) was a Canadian insurance executive, member of the Legislative Assembly of Ontario from 1955 to 1959, and senior political advisor to Ontario Premier John Robarts in the 1960s as well as a senior political strategist in the Ontario Progressive Conservative Party during Robarts's leadership.

== Biography ==
Jackson was born in Toronto but moved to London, Ontario when he was seven. His father was a travelling salesman. He left high school in the middle of grade 13 to join The Royal Canadian Regiment, serving with them during World War II in England, Sicily and Italy, and rising to the rank of captain. Disagreeing with the Liberal Party of Canada's position on conscription, he joined the Progressive Conservatives after the war and served as a backroom strategist for Harry Oliver White in Middlesex East in the 1949 Canadian federal election.

Jackson first met Robarts socially in 1950, becoming friends. When Robarts entered politics as the Progressive Conservative candidate in London in the 1951 Ontario general election, Jackson volunteered to be one of his campaign workers. In the 1955 Ontario general election, the London riding was split into two and Jackson ran and won in the new riding of London South. Jackson chose not to run for re-election in the 1959 Ontario general election in order to concentrate on his insurance business and family, but co-managed Robarts's own re-election campaign in London North. In 1959, he suggested to Robarts that he run for the party leadership once Premier Leslie Frost retired and managed Robarts's dark horse leadership campaign in the 1961 Progressive Conservative Party of Ontario leadership election, which Robarts won on the sixth ballot. Jackson went on to be the new premier's closest political confidant. Robarts charged Jackson with the assignment of re-organizing the provincial party and was the party's campaign chairman in the 1963 Ontario general election and 1967 Ontario general election, both of which the Conservatives won with large majorities. Jackson died of cancer in 1995 at the age of 73.
