= People First Republican Party of Ontario =

- Active provincial party
- Leader: Trueman Tuck
- President: Chris Gupta
- Founder: Trueman Tuck
- Founded: 2007
- Dissolved: 2019
- Headquarters: 444 Dundas St E, Suites H & I Belleville, Ontario; K8N 1E9
- Ideology: Dominionism; Grassroots democracy anti-monarchism
- Colours: Lilac

Website
- www.pfrpo.ca

The People First Republican Party of Ontario was a minor political party in Ontario, Canada, registered by Elections Ontario in 2004 as the Republican Party of Ontario. It nominated one to three candidates in the provincial elections of 2007, 2011, and 2015. The party was founded by Trueman Tuck, a former Freedom Party of Ontario candidate.

== Party platform ==
The party was opposed to corporations, describing itself as a grassroots organization that would grant small businesses more authority. It described itself as multifaith, and advocated for family values and equality.

== Election results ==
Year of election	# of candidates	# of seats won	# of votes	% of popular vote
2007	2	0	272	0.01%
