= Consensus Ontario =

- Defunct provincial party
- Leader: Ron Patava
- President: Ron Patava
- Founded: 2018
- Dissolved: February 2025
- Headquarters: 64 Jersey Lane Halton Hills ON L7G 0G9
- Ideology: Populism; Non-partisan consensus government
- Political position: Centre
- Seats in Legislature: 0 / 107

Website
- www.consensusontario.ca

Consensus Ontario is a defunct political party in Ontario, Canada. The party was led by Ron Patava.

== History ==
Consensus Ontario was founded in 2016 as a think tank. Its original leader, Brad Harness, was the leader of the Reform Party of Ontario and founder of the Ontario Party of Canada, two smaller populist parties in the early 2000s. In preparation for the 2018 Ontario general election, the think tank registered as an official political party with Elections Ontario and fielded ten candidates for the election. The party de-registered after the 2018 election, but re-registered on May 11, 2022.

In 2024, Ron Patava took over as leader from Brad Harness.

The party was deregistered by Elections Ontario in February 2025, after failing to nominate 2 candidates for the 2025 election. Party leader Ron Patava was originally listed as the candidate for the party in Wellington—Halton Hills; however, after the party deregistered, he became an independent on the ballot.

== Platform ==
The party has detailed several priority issues on its website; these include:

1. Introducing a single flat rate for electricity
2. Reducing wait-times at health centres
3. Building a long-term policy for rural and agricultural regions in Ontario
4. Supporting immigration resettlement to rural areas
5. Giving more autonomy to municipalities for planning and taxation
6. Increased long-term care funding for seniors
7. Overhauling the Ontario school curriculum, including the sexual education program
8. Construction of high-speed rail in the province
9. Turning the Gardiner Expressway and Don Valley Parkway into provincial highways

Consensus Ontario's keystone policy is the removal of all political parties provincially and moving toward a non-partisan Consensus democracy. Consensus democracy, used in the northern territorial governments of the Northwest Territories and Nunavut, members of the legislature would not be bound by party discipline to choose a leader, speaker, or policy position. The party also supports several other areas of democratic reform, including recall elections and referendums.

The party also pays special attention to the provincial debt. One of Consensus Ontario's founding principles calls for a balanced budget. The party hopes to balance the provincial budget within its first term in government, hoping to find 10% savings for taxpayers.

== Election results ==
Including party leader Harness, Consensus Ontario nominated 10 candidates for the 2018 Ontario general election. In total, the party got 2,682 votes finishing 9th among 28 parties.

Election results
Riding	Candidate's name	Notes	Votes	%	Rank
Humber River—Black Creek	Scott Aitchison		320	1.03	6/7
Burlington	Peter Rusin		154	0.24	7/7
Perth—Wellington	Paul McKendrick		320	0.68	6/8
Kitchener—Conestoga	Dan Holt		212	0.49	6/6
Haliburton—Kawartha Lakes—Brock	Chuck MacMillan		312	0.55	7/7
Dufferin—Caledon	Stephen McKendrick		301	0.49	6/7
Sudbury	Mila Chavez Wong		284	0.79	5/8
London West	Brad Harness		304	0.52	6/8
Bruce—Grey—Owen Sound	Janice Kaikkonen		261	0.53	7/8
Nickel Belt	Kevin Brault		214	0.59	7/8
