= Finding Farley =

- Directed by: Leanne Allison
- Written by: Leanne Allison; Karsten Heuer
- Produced by: Tracey Friesen; Catrina Longmuir
- Starring: Leanne Allison; Karsten Heuer; Zev Heuer
- Cinematography: Leanne Allison
- Edited by: Janice Brown
- Music by: Dennis Burke
- Production company: National Film Board of Canada
- Release date: 13 October 2009 (VIFF)
- Running time: 62 minutes
- Country: Canada
- Language: English

Finding Farley is a 2009 documentary directed by Leanne Allison as she and her husband Karsten Heuer travel across Canada in the literary footsteps of the Canadian writer Farley Mowat.

Heuer, a biologist and author, had written a book on his experiences making the documentary Being Caribou, in which he and Allison traveled 1,500 kilometres (930 mi) by foot across Arctic tundra following a herd of 120,000 Porcupine caribou. After reading a draft of Heuer's account, Mowat invited them to visit him at his summer farm in Cape Breton Island.

Accompanied by their two-year-old son Zev and dog Willow, the couple left their home in Canmore in May 2007 for a 5,000 kilometres (3,100 mi), six-month trek east across Canada. From Canmore, 100 kilometres west of Calgary, they canoed to Hudson Bay, visiting many of the settings that Mowat wrote about in Never Cry Wolf, Lost in the Barrens and People of the Deer. From Hudson Bay, their plan was to travel by sea to northern Labrador, the setting of Mowat's stories such as The Serpent's Coil, Grey Seas Under, Sea of Slaughter and A Whale for the Killing. From Newfoundland and Labrador they planned a final journey by water, arriving at Cape Breton near the end of October. Finding Farley was the top film at the 2010 Banff Mountain Film Festival, receiving both the Grand Prize and People's Choice awards.
