= John Mowat =

John Mowat may refer to:

- John Mowat (college administrator) (1791–1860), Scottish-born politician and college administrator in Ontario, Canada
- John Mowat (Dean of Brechin), Dean of Brechin, 1947–1953
- John Bower Mowat (1825–1900), Presbyterian minister and university professor in Ontario, Canada
- John McDonald Mowat (1872–1916), lawyer and politician in Ontario, Canada
- John Stuart Mowat (1923–2001), Scottish QC and Liberal politician
