= Grand Banks of Newfoundland =

Group of underwater plateaus south-east of Newfoundland

Coordinates: 45°14′13″N 50°59′21.2″W

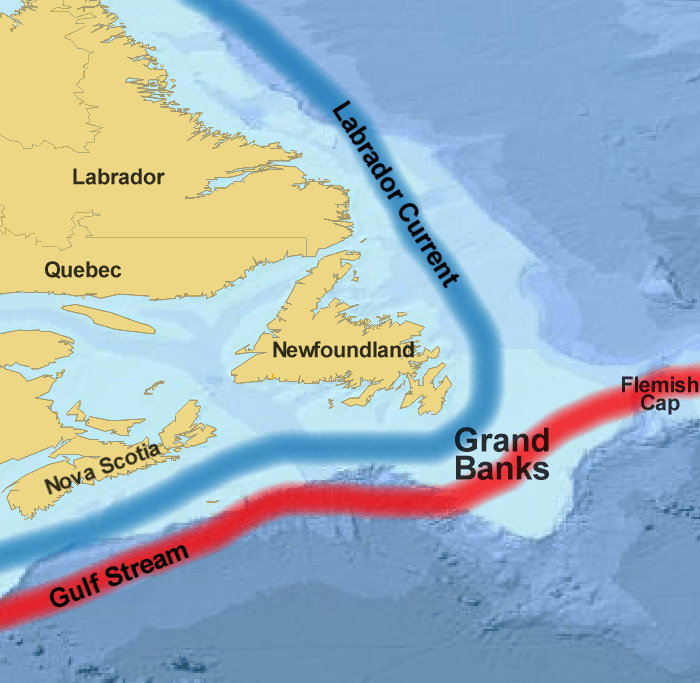
Map showing the Grand Banks

The Grand Banks of Newfoundland are a series of underwater plateaus south-east of the island of Newfoundland on the North American continental shelf. The Grand Banks are one of the world's richest fishing grounds, supporting swordfish, haddock and capelin, as well as shellfish, seabirds and sea mammals. Overfishing in the late 20th century caused the collapse of several species, particularly Atlantic cod, leading to the closure of the Canadian Grand Banks fishery from 1992 to 2024.

== Geography and marine life ==
The Grand Banks of Newfoundland are a group of underwater plateaus south-east of Newfoundland on the North American continental shelf. These areas are relatively shallow, ranging from 15 to 91 metres (50 to 300 ft) in depth. The cold Labrador Current mixes with the warm waters of the Gulf Stream here, often causing extreme foggy conditions.

The mixing of these waters and the shape of the ocean bottom lifts nutrients to the surface. These conditions helped to create one of the richest fishing grounds in the world. Fish species include Atlantic cod, swordfish, haddock and capelin; shellfish include scallop and lobster. The area also supports large colonies of seabirds such as northern gannets, shearwaters and sea ducks and various sea mammals such as seals, dolphins and whales.

== History ==
Extensive glaciation took place in the area of the Grand Banks during the Last Glacial Maximum. By approximately 13,000 years ago the majority of the ice had melted, leaving the Grand Banks exposed as several islands extending for hundreds of kilometres. It is believed that rising sea levels submerged these around 8,000 years ago.

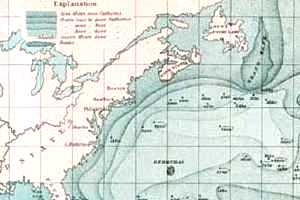
Historic chart including the Grand Banks.

While no archaeological evidence for a European presence near the Grand Banks survives from the period between the short-lived Greenland Norse settlement at L'Anse aux Meadows in 1000 CE and John Cabot's transatlantic crossing in 1497, some evidence suggests that voyagers from the Basque Region and England (specifically from Bristol) and others preceded Cabot. In the 15th century some texts refer to a land called Bacalao, the land of the codfish, which is possibly Newfoundland. Within a few years of Cabot's voyage the existence of fishing grounds on the Grand Banks became generally known in Europe. Ships from France and Portugal pioneered fishing there, followed by vessels from Spain, while ships from England were scarce in the early years. This soon changed, especially after Bernard Drake's Newfoundland Expedition in 1585, which virtually wiped out the Spanish and Portuguese fishing-industries in this area. The fish stocks became important for the early European-settler economies of eastern Canada and New England.

On 18 November 1929, the 1929 Grand Banks earthquake struck the southwestern part of the Grand Banks bordering the Laurentian Channel, causing an underwater landslide which resulted in extensive damage to transatlantic cables and generated a rare Atlantic tsunami that struck the south coast of Newfoundland, claiming 29 lives on the Burin Peninsula.

Technological advances in fishing (such as using large factory-ships and sonar), as well as geopolitical disputes over territorial sea and exclusive economic zone (EEZ) boundaries, led to overfishing and a serious decline in the fish stocks of the Grand Banks from around 1990. The Canadian Grand Banks fishery was closed in 1993.

Canada's EEZ currently covers the majority of the Grand Banks except for the lucrative "nose" (eastern extremity, near the Flemish Cap) and "tail" (southern extremity) of the fishing bank. The 1783 Treaty of Paris gave the United States shared rights to fish in these waters, but that section of the Treaty is no longer in force. The exclusive economic zone of the French territory Saint Pierre and Miquelon occupies a pin-shaped section at the west edge of the Grand Banks, with the 22 kilometres (12 nmi; 14 mi) radius head of the pin surrounding the islands and the needle heading south for 348 km (188 nmi; 216 mi).

== Geological research ==
Canada is performing the hydrographic and geological surveys necessary for claiming the entire continental shelf off eastern Canada, as allowed by the terms of the latest United Nations Convention on the Law of the Sea (UNCLOS).

Petroleum reserves have also been discovered and a number of oil fields are under development in this region, most notably the Hibernia, Terra Nova, and White Rose projects. However, the harsh environment on the Grand Banks also led to the Ocean Ranger disaster.

== Climate change ==
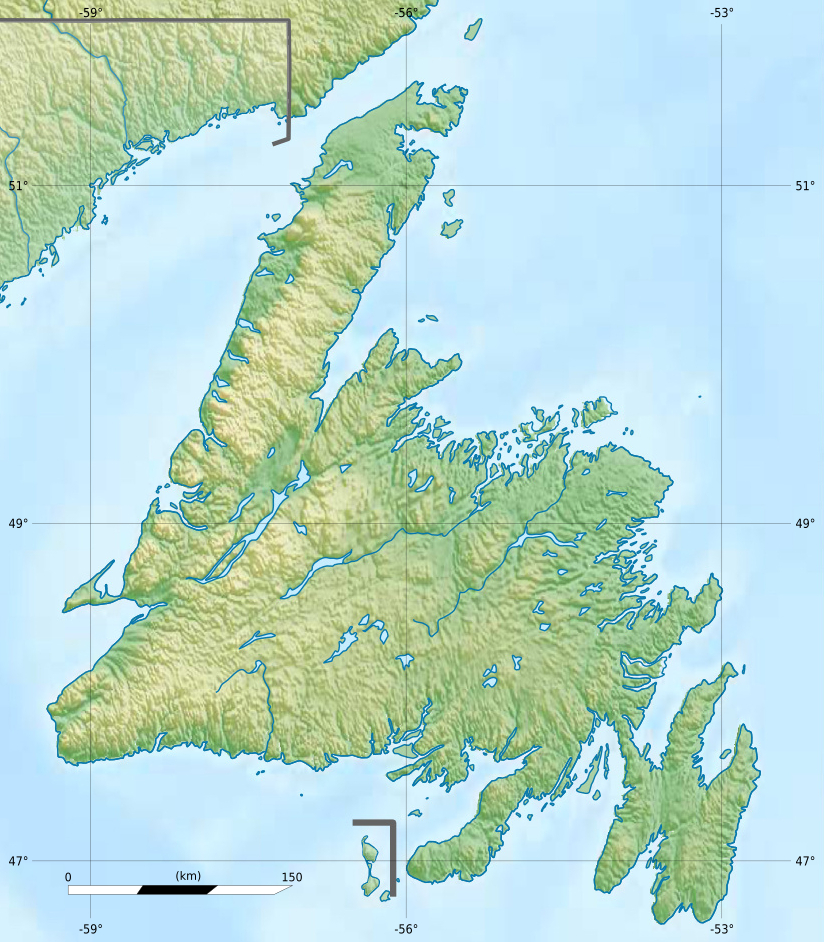
The Station 27 Oceanographic Monitoring Station records water temperatures in the Newfoundland Shelf, including the Grand Banks.

The Northwest Atlantic Ocean is undergoing long-term warming from climate change. The surface water temperatures of the Newfoundland Shelf have increased by 0.13 °C per decade from 1950 to 2016. Depth-averaged ocean temperatures (0–175 m) have not shown a warming trend during that same period.

== Culture ==
Semi-fictional depictions of fishermen working on the Grand Banks can be found in Rudyard Kipling's novel Captains Courageous (1897) and in Sebastian Junger's non-fiction book The Perfect Storm (1997). The Grand Banks are also portrayed in the 1990 film The Hunt for Red October. Herman Melville described passing through the Banks as a young sailor on his first voyage in his autobiographical novel Redburn: His First Voyage (1849), where he saw whales and a haunting shipwreck with weeks-dead sailors still on board. It is also featured in The Grey Seas Under, a non-fiction book by Canadian author Farley Mowat about the ocean-going maritime salvage tug Foundation Franklin.

The Canadian patriotic song "Something to Sing About" opens with the line "I have walked 'cross the sand on the Grand Banks of Newfoundland." However, as the banks are underwater, it is impossible to walk across them in reality.

== See also ==
- Banks dory
- Collapse of the Atlantic northwest cod fishery
- Oil spill
- Turbot War
- West Greenland Current
