= Albans =

Albans may refer to:

- Italic Albans, ancient people in the region of Latium, Italy
- Caucasian Albans, inhabitants of ancient Caucasian Albania
- Albans Wood, a nature reserve in Watford, Hertfordshire (UK)
- Albans (fictional people), thus named in The Alban Quest (1998)

== See also ==
- St. Albans (disambiguation)
- Albanians (disambiguation)
