= Carroll Ballard =

American film director (born 1937)

- Born: October 14, 1937 (age 89); Los Angeles, California, U.S.
- Education: University of California, Los Angeles
- Occupations: Director; cinematographer
- Years active: 1965–2005
- Spouse: Christina Lüscher
- Children: 1
- Website: ballardvineyard.com

Carroll Ballard (born October 14, 1937) is an American filmmaker. Originally a documentarian, he became known for directing sweeping, visually striking films with natural and ecological themes. His body of work includes the films The Black Stallion (1979), Never Cry Wolf (1983), and Fly Away Home (1996).

== Early life ==
Ballard was born in Los Angeles in 1937. After serving in the U.S. Army, Ballard attended film school at UCLA, where one of his classmates was Francis Ford Coppola. He made a well received student film called Waiting for May in 1964.

== Career ==
=== Documentaries ===
His early credits include the documentaries Beyond This Winter's Wheat (1965) and Harvest (1967), both of which he made for the U.S. Information Agency. The latter was nominated for an Academy Award for Best Documentary Feature Film.

He directed a short subject called The Perils of Priscilla (1969), which was filmed from the point of view of a cat who escapes from home. Rodeo (1970) provided an intimate look at the 1968 National Finals Rodeo in Oklahoma City.

He shot the title sequence of Coppola's 1968 musical Finian's Rainbow and was second unit cinematographer on Star Wars (1977), for which he handled many of the outdoor desert scenes.

=== Feature film director ===
Ballard finally got the chance to make a feature film when Coppola offered him the job of directing The Black Stallion (1979), an adaptation of the children's book by Walter Farley. The film was nominated for two Academy Awards, including Best Supporting Actor (Mickey Rooney). In 2002 the Library of Congress added it to the National Film Registry.

He then directed Never Cry Wolf (1983), based on Farley Mowat's autobiographical book of the same name, which detailed Mowat's experiences with Arctic wolves.

In the 1990s, he made two films: Wind (1992) and Fly Away Home (1996). In 2002, Ballard completed The Cruelest Winter, a film written by David Assael about Yukon sled dogs and their handlers, which remains unreleased as of 2026. The film never made it to theaters because it did not receive the backing or respect of the studio, leading to it being effectively shelved.

His most recent film is Duma (2005), about a South African boy's friendship with an orphaned cheetah. Duma had tested badly and Warner Bros. planned to not release this film in the United States theatrically, but the film received acclaim from influential film critics like Scott Foundas and Roger Ebert, and it led Warner Bros to reconsider. Warner Bros. finally gave Duma a limited theatrical release in the US.

Ballard has received acclaim from film critics. Pauline Kael was an early admirer. Kenneth Turan once wrote: "[Ballard] knows how to be both caring and restrained, minimizing a movie's saccharine content while maximizing the sense of wonder."

=== Unrealized projects ===
- Heart of Darkness (1969)
- Vesuvia (1969)
- Untitled Declaration of Independence film (c. 1970s)
- Swift Runner (c. 1970s)
- Junior Bonner (1972)
- War and Peace (1975)
- The Secret Garden (1978)
- The Escape Artist (1978)
- The Snow Leopard (1979)
- Beauty and the Beast (1982)
- The Monkey Wrench Gang (c. 1980s)
- Very Far Away (1986)
- Undisclosed Maurice Sendak collaboration (1986)
- A Story Like the Wind (1987)
- Hard Rain (1988)
- Colter's Run (1998)
- Gertrude and Claudius (2005)
- Untitled historical drama series (2017)

After the release of Never Cry Wolf, Ballard spent a decade trying to get a total of fourteen separate film projects off the ground—to no avail—before he agreed to Wind. When later asked what had led him to choosing to direct Duma despite repetitive themes, Ballard responded, "Well, I mean, the fact is I was having trouble getting a film. You know, I went for five years and I couldn't get a picture off the ground. So, this was a project that Warner Brothers had been fooling with for a while, and they called me about it and I went down, I talked to 'em and it was the deal I could make. It was, you know, they'd decided they were probably gonna make the film... so I went for it." Speaking about his relatively small output when compared to that of his colleagues, he reasoned:

"Forty-five years I've been trying to make films, and five years I've actually made films; shows you the attrition rate. But, you know, I'm sort of a... not a typical case because I'm a lousy salesman, an even worse politician, and, in film school, those are the two things they should teach you more than anything else – how to sell your ideas, how to sell your notions, and how to 'play the game' once you get the deal going. 'Cause you have to deal with a lot of people, and it's a very, very political situation, in terms of somebody investing millions of their dollars in your ideas, you know? So, it's a lot easier for certain kinds of personalities than it is for others. In my case it's been exceedingly difficult. I've had fifty, sixty films that I've prepaired and wanted to do and, you know, begged and hollered and screamed and did everything I could and... had no takers. And I've never made a film that I wanted to make from the get-go. All the films I've made are films that somebody came to me and said, 'Oh, would you make this film?'"

== Personal life ==
Since 2002, Ballard and his wife Christina have operated a vineyard in the Napa Valley. They have one child, Nora.

== Filmography ==
=== As director ===
Year	Title	Notes
1965	Pigs!	Documentary short
1965	Beyond This Winter's Wheat	Documentary short
1967	Harvest	Documentary
1969	Rodeo	Documentary short
1969	The Perils of Priscilla	Documentary short
1971	Seems Like Only Yesterday	Documentary short
1974	Crystalization	Documentary short
1974	The Hello Machine	Documentary short
1979	The Black Stallion	
1983	Never Cry Wolf	
1986	Nutcracker: The Motion Picture	
1992	Wind	
1996	Fly Away Home	
2002	The Cruelest Winter	Unreleased
2005	Duma	

=== Other production credits ===
Year	Title	Director	Notes
1964	3 Nuts in Search of a Bolt	Tommy Noonan	Production designer
1968	Finian's Rainbow	Francis Ford Coppola	Second unit cinematographer
1977	Star Wars	George Lucas	Second unit cinematographer
1995	My Family	Gregory Nava	Cinematographer: River crew

== Awards and nominations ==
Award	Year	Category	Work	Result
Academy Award	1968	Best Documentary Feature Film	Harvest	Nominated
Christopher Award	1997	Best Motion Picture	Fly Away Home	Won
Los Angeles Film Critics Association	1980	New Generation Award	The Black Stallion	Won
Western Heritage Award	1984	Best Theatrical Motion Picture	Never Cry Wolf	Won
