= Woman in the Mists =

Book by Farley Mowat

- Paperback edition
- Author: Farley Mowat
- Language: English
- Subject: Biography
- Genre: Non-fiction
- Publisher: Warner Books
- Publication date: 1987
- Publication place: United States
- Media type: Print (Hardcover)
- Pages: 380
- ISBN: 0-356-17106-X

Woman in the Mists: The Story of Dian Fossey and the Mountain Gorillas of Africa is a 1987 biography of the conservationist Dian Fossey, who studied and lived among the mountain gorillas of Rwanda. It is written by the Canadian author Farley Mowat, himself a conservationist and author of the book Never Cry Wolf.

== Plot ==
Dian Fossey worked in the United States in a children's hospital until she decided to become a field anthropologist in Africa. Mowat says this decision illustrates the strength of character that made her famous and that may also have led to her death. In 1960 she gained an interview with Louis Leakey, the famous anthropologist, who encouraged her to study the mountain gorillas of Central Africa at first hand. She accepted this advice against the wishes of her friends and family.

At first, it seemed that she was following the path defined by Jane Goodall, and would become a successful scientist. However, she soon became passionately interested in the cause of preserving the mountain gorillas. An outspoken woman, she made no attempt to disguise her hatred and contempt for poachers and hunters. In December 1985 she was murdered in her African camp. Although the book does not delve into the subject in depth, Mowat speculates that an ex-worker may have been hired to kill her by larger corporate interests opposed to her crusade to preserve the gorillas.

== Themes ==
Farley Mowat is sympathetic to Fossey's interest in preserving the gorillas. He gives a portrait of her intense feelings, without concealing that she had a stubborn and difficult personality. She became bitter, with no intimate friends, and her single-mindedness may have contributed to her death. A secondary theme is the importance of preserving the mountain gorillas, which accords with Mowat's own interests as a conservationist.

== Publication ==
The title is a play on the title of Dian Fossey's 1983 book Gorillas in the Mist in which she described her work with mountain gorillas, and which provided some of the material used in the 1988 biographical film Gorillas in the Mist starring Sigourney Weaver.

- Woman in the Mists: The Story of Dian Fossey and the Mountain Gorillas of Africa (Hardcover). USA: Warner Books. 1987. 380 pp. ISBN 0-356-17106-X.
- Virunga: The Passion of Dian Fossey (Hardcover). Toronto, Ontario: McClelland & Stewart. 1987. 427 pp. ISBN 978-0771066771.
- Woman in the Mists (Hardcover). Macdonald. 1988. ISBN 0-356-17106-X.
- Woman in the Mists (Paperback). Grand Central Publishing. 1988. ISBN 0-446-38720-7.
- Woman in the Mists (Hardcover). UK: Turtleback Books. 2001. ISBN 0-8335-3831-4.

== Literary reception ==
According to Stefan Kanfer of Time Magazine, "Mowat is scrupulously fair: he shows his subject antagonizing co-workers as she lurches from tantrum to euphoria and back again, but he praises her meticulous observations of animal life and her unceasing struggles with poachers and politics as she fights to save the mountain gorillas from extinction ... Mowat finally makes some convincing accusations of government-sponsored assassins. But he concedes, sadly, that Fossey's misanthropy made her an accessory to the crime".

A reviewer for Publishers Weekly describes the book as "a gripping story from beginning to gruesome end, filled with drama, intrigue and love affairs... Her mercurial personality alone gives the book a wider audience than most in the nature-adventure genre and it is fitting that such a passionate defender of wildlife as Mowat write about her". Frank Reiser writing in Library Journal says "This gripping, action-packed story is essential reading for all who understand the sacrifice of self for the preservation of other species. Highly recommended".
