= The Farfarers =

1998 book by Farley Mowat

- Hardcover edition
- Author: Farley Mowat
- Language: English
- Subject: Pre-Columbian trans-oceanic contact
- Genre: Non-fiction
- Publisher: Key Porter Books
- Publication date: November 1, 1998
- Publication place: Canada
- Media type: Print, e-book
- Pages: 377 pp. (1st edition)
- ISBN: 978-1550139891

The Farfarers: Before the Norse is a non-fiction book by Farley Mowat, setting out a theory about pre-Columbian trans-oceanic contact. Mowat's thesis is that before the Vikings, North America was discovered and settled by Europeans from Orkney. They reached Canada after a generation-spanning migration that used Iceland and Greenland as 'stepping stones'. Mowat's ideas are controversial and have been accused of being over-speculative. The book has been published in the UK as The Alban Quest.

== The 'Albans' ==
Mowat's premise is that Iceland, Greenland and North America were visited and settled before the Vikings by Europeans from the northern British Isles. Mowat refers to these people as Albans, after the ancestral name for the British Isles, and maintains that the Albans were descendants of the original Neolithic peoples of Britain displaced by the Celts. He argues that these peoples were pushed to the fringes of north-western Europe, in Northern Scotland, Orkney and Shetland by Armorican refugees fleeing the Romans. The latter constructed brochs along the coasts of Scotland and became known as the Picts.

Mowat believes that the Albans were hunters of walrus ivory. Demand for this valuable material led the Albans to discover Iceland or Thule centuries before the Vikings (as described by the Greek explorer Pytheas in 330 BC). The Albans used sophisticated long-distance boats with hulls made of hide.

== Iceland ==
Mowat believes that settlement of Iceland began early in the first millennium AD. After the end of Roman rule in Britain, unrest and military threats to Alba from the Scoti in the west and the Vikings in the north resulted in widespread settlement of Iceland by fleeing Albans during the 5th to 7th centuries .

In search of new sources of ivory, Alban hunters explored the coasts of Greenland, Baffin Island, Ungava Bay, and Labrador before discovering Newfoundland.

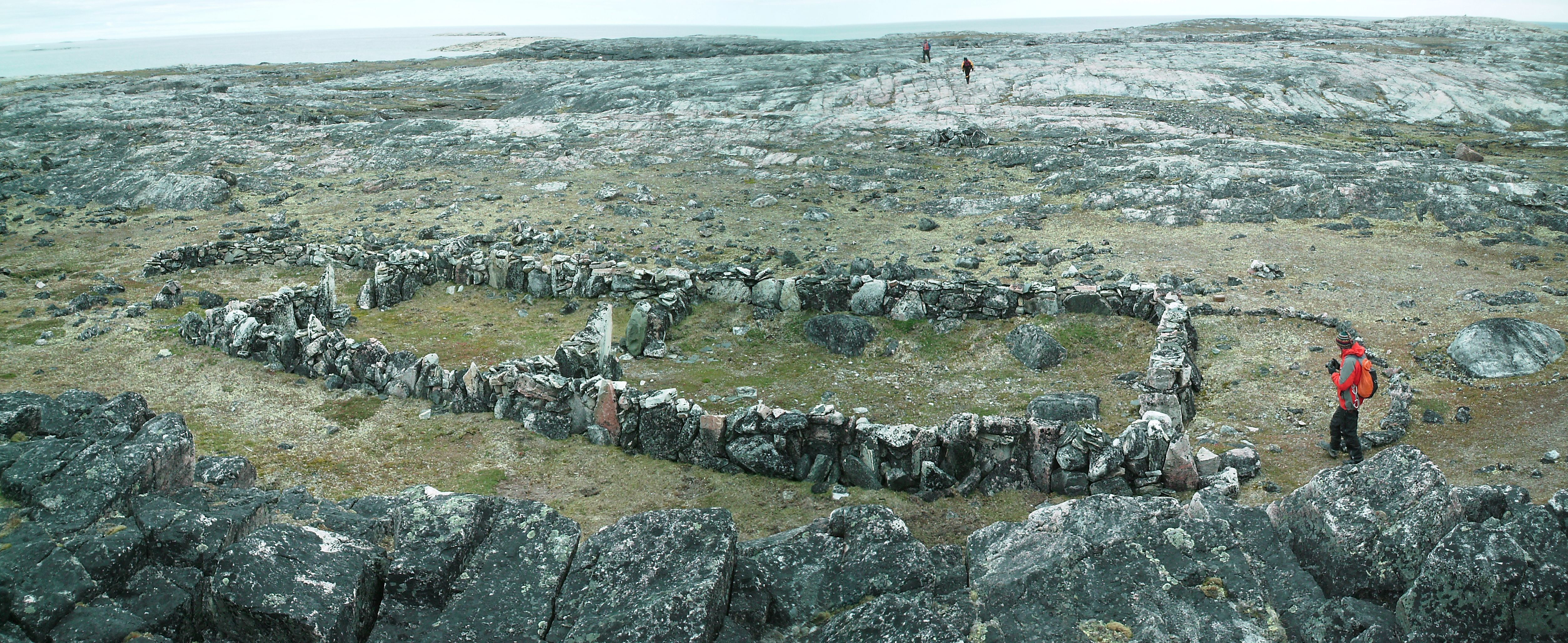
Pamiok Island (near Kangirsuk), Longhouse No. 2

Mowat believes that the hunters would create camp sites for overwintering by placing their boats on top of stone foundations, like the one on Pamiok Island. Mowat believes that the Albans encountered the Tunit in the Canadian Arctic, and that some Albans eventually lived and intermarried with the Tunit.

Mowat believes that Viking interest in Iceland was prompted by the wealth of ivory and other materials such as furs reaching Europe on Alban ships from Iceland. In support of this, he cites the Viking Sagas, which state that the Viking discoverers of Iceland found it to be already inhabited by a people the Vikings called the Papar. On first arrival in Iceland, Viking explorers like Naddodd, Hrafna-Flóki Vilgerðarson, Garðar Svavarsson and Ingólfr Arnarson took refuge in some of the most inhospitable places, as if the land was inhabited by a hostile population. The start of Viking occupation of Iceland in the 870s prompted a second Alban migration to the fjords of southwestern Greenland and to central Labrador.

== Newfoundland ==
Mowat believes that the Albans discovered Newfoundland in the early 900s. With both suitable land for crofting and a large walrus population, this would have drawn Alban settlers, hunters and European traders southwards from southwestern Greenland and central Labrador. The resulting decline in these areas meant that when Vikings first started appearing off the Greenland coast at the end of the tenth century, it prompted a rapid and third large scale move of Albans, this time to Newfoundland.

Mowat believes that the Albans settled mostly in southwest Newfoundland, along the coastline between Channel-Port aux Basques and Port au Port. Word of the wealth of this area reached the Vikings via traders, and became known to the Vikings as Hvítramannaland or Albania. Mowat believes that the voyages of Leif Erikson and Thorfinn Karlsefni were in part attempts to raid Hvítramannaland which failed either due to being unable to find it, or due to hostile encounters with local natives that the Vikings called Skrælings.

Mowat suggests that the Albans continued to live in southwestern Newfoundland for several centuries, keeping a tenuous link to Europe through trade and clerical visits through the early Middle Ages. This link broke in the 14th century, and the Albans were isolated until the voyages of John Cabot and the start of European fishing around Newfoundland. Predations by European pirates forced the Albans inland, possibly as far as King George IV Lake. Although he considers it likely that their ethnic distinctiveness disappeared in intermarriage, Mowat suggests that a group of relatively dark-skinned Newfoundlanders known as the Jackatars (whose ethnic origins are unknown, but are most often thought of as a mix of Mi'kmaq and Acadian peoples), might conceivably be the last surviving descendants of the Albans.

== Reactions ==
Canadian Geographic published excerpts of the book in their Sept/Oct 1998 issue. The editors described the book as "a highly speculative blend of history and archeology. In it, Mowat again draws upon Norse sagas, the chronicles of Irish monks, accounts of Roman travellers, as well as the works of modern historians and archeologists. It is both detailed and, as with all early history, sketchy. The written record for much of the period covered is scant and the archeological record spotty. Still, such speculative writing can suggest avenues of exploration and study for future researchers. No professional archeologists are known to share Mowat’s theories but that does not disturb him. A literary gadfly for much of his long career, Mowat is happy to stir up debate and challenge academics to match the visions that he champions and defends with such vigour and relish."

Richard Ellis of The New York Times stated that "The Farfarers is worth reading, if for no other reason than to experience a provocative, alternative version of history, written by a master storyteller."

Stuart C. Brown of the Department of Anthropology, Memorial University stated that "As any competent archaeologist will tell you, in prehistory few things are impossible -- so Mowat's hypothesis cannot be simply dismissed out of hand. There is a small problem though, which must be overcome before an hypothesis can be at least provisionally accepted: the presentation of reasonably compelling evidence." Brown goes on to point out that there is no evidence at the Pamiok site that anyone other than Tunit used it. He concludes by saying "Can I recommend The Farfarers? Most certainly! I have always enjoyed Farley Mowat's writing and his abiding fascination with Canada and its past. To this tale he brings the full powers of his imagination but, while it is entertaining as fiction, it is far from convincing as fact."

== See also ==
- Point Rosee
