= Newfoundland Highland forests =

Taiga ecoregion of Newfoundland and Labrador, Canada

Coordinates: 55.0000°N 70.0000°W

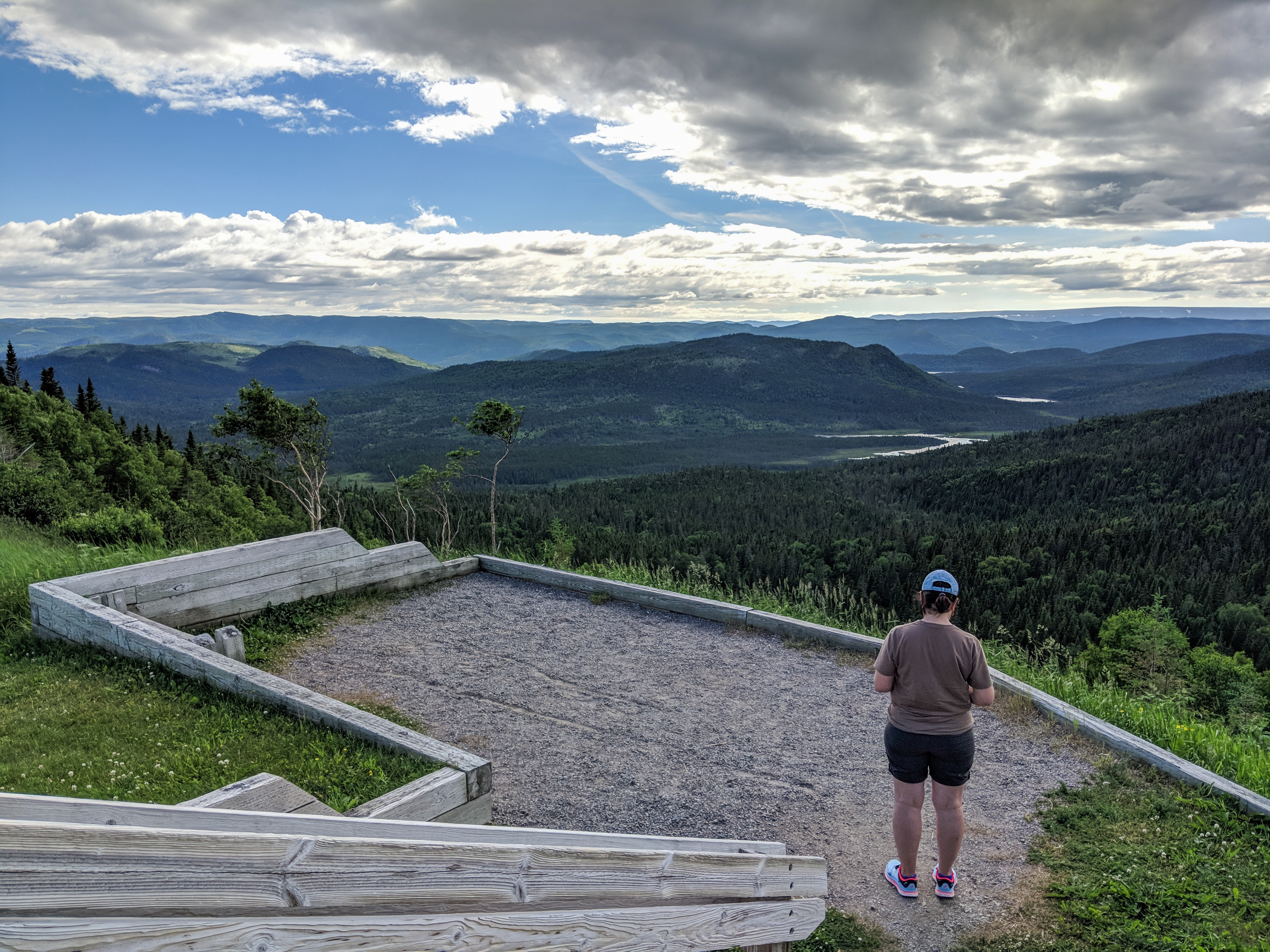
- Highland forests of the Long Range Mountains in Gros Morne National Park

Ecology
- Realm: Nearctic
- Biome: Boreal forests/taiga
- Borders: Eastern Canadian forests

Geography
- Area: 486,918 km^{2} (188,000 mi^{2})
- Country: Canada
- Provinces: Newfoundland and Labrador

Conservation
- Conservation status: Relatively Stable/Intact

The Newfoundland Highland forests are a taiga ecoregion located on the island of Newfoundland in Newfoundland and Labrador, Canada. It has a total area of 4,031,999 acres (1,631,692 hectares).

== Terrain ==
The terrain of this region is mostly between 300 and 700 meters above sea level. It is characterized by steep, rugged Palaeozoic and Precambrian rock, commonly bare or ridged.

== Climate ==
The winters are snowy and cold, and the summers are cool. The region receives between 1,000 and 1,400 millimeters mean annual precipitation.

Mean annual temperature: 4 °C Mean summer temperature range: 11.5 °C to 12 °C Mean winter temperature range: -3.5 °C to -4 °C.

Type	Units	Jan	Feb	Mar	Apr	May	Jun	Jul	Aug	Sep	Oct	Nov	Dec	Period
Min Temp	°F	10.2	7.8	14.9	26.4	34.7	43.6	51.7	51.6	44.9	35.8	27.2	18.3	1991–2009
Mean Temp	°F	17.1	15.4	22.4	33.8	43.4	52.9	60.3	59.7	51.9	41.6	32.4	23.3	1974–2009
Max Temp	°F	24.9	24.1	30.9	40.9	52.4	62.6	69.7	69	60.8	48.8	38.8	30.5	1994–2009
Frost	Days	31	28.2	31	30	28.3	14.9	1.7	3.4	11	27.9	30	31	1901–2009
Wet	Days	24.2	17.5	15.2	12.5	13.9	13.8	13.8	13.9	17.5	19	20.4	23.7	1901–2009
Precipitation	in	5.3	3.6	3.3	2.7	2.9	3.6	3.8	4.1	4.2	4.9	5	5	1901–2009

== Flora and fauna ==
The region contains boreal forests with dwarf black spruce (Picea mariana) and balsam fir (Abies balsamea), dwarf kalmia (Kalmia polifolia), and various mosses. Various mixed evergreen and deciduous shrubs can be found in exposed areas.

The Arctic hare (Lepus arcticus) is found in this region. It is their southernmost limit to their range.

Other species include:

- Canada goose (Branta canadensis)
- Great horned owl (Bubo virginianus)
- Brown-headed cowbird (Molothrus ater)
- Snowshoe hare (Lepus americanus)
- Caribou (Rangifer tarandus)
- Red fox (Vulpes vulpes)
- Newfoundland pine marten (Martes americana atrata)

== Conservation ==
The region is threatened by an increase in harvest of wood for lumber and the pulp and paper industry. Higher elevations are mostly threatened by mining interests and granite quarrying. Further threats come from high all-terrain vehicle traffic, which affect some areas.

80 to 90 percent of the region is considered to be intact. Large areas of the region are protected. These are:

- Gros Morne National Park: Comprising upper elevations, and located in western Newfoundland, this area contains 1,942 km^{2}. of protected land.
- King George IV Ecological Reserve: Also located in western Newfoundland, this area contains 19 km^{2} of protected land.
- Barachois Pond Provincial Park: Located in southwestern Newfoundland, this protected area is 34.97 km^{2}.

== See also ==
- List of ecoregions in Canada (WWF)
