= Ludwig N. Carbyn =

Canadian biologist, ecologist

- Born: Namibia, Africa
- Education: Mount Allison University, University of Alberta, University of Toronto
- Known for: Wolf ecology research and wildlife conservation
- Scientific career
- Fields: Biology, Ecology, Conservation
- Workplaces: Canadian Wildlife Service, University of Alberta

Ludwig "Lu" Norbert Carbyn is an internationally recognized expert on wolf biology, a research scientist emeritus at the Canadian Wildlife Service, and an adjunct professor at the University of Alberta in Edmonton, Alberta. He has studied wolf ecology and behaviour in Canada since 1970, including pioneering research into the ecological role of wolves as predators in the Canadian Rocky Mountains as well as the wolf-bison ecosystem of Wood Buffalo National Park. On a Canadian Wildlife Service assignment in Jasper National Park, he became the first human to study wild wolves from within a wolf pack using habituation, a method of gaining insights into the biology of wolves portrayed in fiction by Farley Mowat's popular book and film, Never Cry Wolf.

Carbyn has conducted research on the ecology of various species of canids in Poland, Portugal, and throughout North America, and was the chairman of the successful Canadian Swift Fox Reintroduction program Recovery Team from 1989 to 1993. He has published six books and numerous articles about wolves, including The Buffalo Wolf - Predators, Prey and the Politics of Nature (2003, Smithsonian Books) which was distinguished as "Best of the Year - Wildlife" in 2004 by the Canadian Geographic magazine. In 2013, Carbyn received the Queen Elizabeth II Diamond Jubilee Medal for services to wildlife conservation in Canada.

== Career ==
From 1967 to 1997, Carbyn worked as a research scientist with the Canadian Wildlife Service. Since 2008, he has been an adjunct professor at the University of Alberta. He has authored, co-authored, and edited five books and has published more than 100 scientific papers. His early research focused on avian population studies, and while on educational leave from government service, he completed his doctoral dissertation at the University of Toronto on wolf-ungulate systems in Jasper National Park.

Carbyn has been interviewed and consulted on a few projects that have been produced into television episodes, including Nova Season 24, Episode 15 - Wild Wolves with David Attenborough (1997; watch on Internet Archive), and CBC News: Country Canada episode - Wild Buffalo Blues (2001; watch on YouTube).

Carbyn continues to write and lecture extensively about habitat protection and its importance in maintaining biodiversity. He advocates for the concept of "The Power of The Individual" (POTI) as a key driver in shaping future conservation ethics. He has demonstrated this commitment by donating land to EALT for conservation purposes. See Lu Carbyn Nature Sanctuary.

Carbyn has received many awards during his professional life, including The Wildlife Society’s Distinguished Service Award.

== Early life ==
Lu Carbyn was born in Namibia (southern Africa) to parents of German heritage living on a cattle ranch. His family immigrated to Canada in 1953. Exposure to natural settings on three continents has sparked his lifelong interest in discovery and adventure in nature.

== Education ==
- B.A., Biology, Mount Allison University (1963)
- M.Sc., Zoology, University of Alberta (1967)
- Ph.D., Zoology, University of Toronto (1975)

== Selected publications ==
- 1971 Carbyn, L.N., Description of the Festuca scrabrella association in Prince Albert National Park, Saskatchewan. Canadian Field-Naturalist. 85: 25-30.
- 1975 Carbyn, L.N., Factors influencing activity patterns on ungulates at mineral licks. Canadian Journal of Zoology, 53: 378-384.
- 1994 Carbyn, L.N., S. Fritts and D. Seip. Ecology and conservation of wolves in a changing world. Canadian Circumpolar Institute Occasional Publication No. 35. University of Alberta, Edmonton. 620 pp.
- 1981 Carbyn, L.N., Territory displacement in a wolf population with abundant prey. Journal of Mammalogy. 62: 193-195.
- 1982 Carbyn, L.N., Coyotes population fluctuations and spatial distribution in relation to wolf territories in Riding Mountain National Park. Canadian Field-Naturalist, 96: 176-183.
- 1983 Carbyn, L.N., Management of Non-Endangered Wolf Populations in Canada. Acta. Zoologica Fennica 174: 239-243.
- 1983 Carbyn, L.N., Wolf predation on elk in Riding Mountain National Park, Manitoba. Journal of Wildlife Management. 47: 963-976.
- 1987 Carbyn, L.N., Gray wolf and red Wolf. In Wildlife furbearer management and conservation in North America. Edited by M. Novak, G.A. Baker, M.E. Obbard and B. Malloch. Ontario Trappers Association, Toronto, Ontario. pp. 359–376.
- 1987 Carbyn, L.N., and T. Trottier. Responses of bison on their calving grounds to predation by wolves in Wood Buffalo National Park. Canadian Journal of Zoology, 65: 2072-2078.
- 1998 Carbyn, L.N., N. Lunn and K. Timoney. 1998. Trends in distribution and abundance of bison in W.B.N.P. Wildlife Society Bulletin. 26(3):463-470.
- 2017 Mech, L.D. et.al. An unparalleled opportunity for an important ecological study . BioScience Vol .67, No.10- Page 875-876.
