= Foundation Franklin =

Tug of the British Royal Navy

- Foundation Franklin before World War II. Two "F"s are clearly visible on the twin funnels.

History

United Kingdom
- Name: Frisky
- Builder: John Lewis and Sons Shipbuilding, Aberdeen
- Yard number: 67
- Laid down: 1918
- Launched: August 1918
- Completed: August 1918
- Commissioned: 1919
- Fate: Sold for commercial service 1924

History
- Name: Frisky (1924–1927); Gustavo Ipland (1927–1930); Foundation Franklin (1930–1949)
- Owner: Ipland family; Foundation Maritime
- Port of registry: Buenos Aires, Argentina; Montreal, Canada
- Acquired: 1924
- In service: 1924
- Out of service: 1948
- Fate: Broken up for scrap 14 April 1949

General characteristics as built
- Type: Tugboat
- Tonnage: 613 GRT
- Length: 47.3 m (155 ft 2 in) pp
- Beam: 9.5 m (31 ft 2 in)
- Draught: 4.3 m (14 ft)
- Propulsion: Triple expansion steam engine, 1,200 hp (890 kW)
- Speed: 15 knots (28 km/h; 17 mph) max

SS Foundation Franklin was a seagoing salvage tug built for the Royal Navy as HMS Frisky in 1918. In 1924, the tugboat was sold and renamed Gustavo Ipland before being acquired in 1930 by Foundation Maritime and renamed Foundation Franklin. The tugboat became famous for many daring salvage operations and rescues between 1930 and 1949. Her many rescues and salvage triumphs were celebrated in Farley Mowat's book The Grey Seas Under. In 1948, the ship was damaged in a hurricane and not considered repairable. The tug was broken up for scrap in 1949 at Halifax, Nova Scotia.

== Description ==
As built, the tugboat measured 613 gross register tons (GRT), was 47.3 m (155 ft 2 in) long between perpendiculars with a beam of 9.5 m (31 ft 2 in). The vessel had a draught of 4.3 m (14 ft). Foundation Franklin was powered by a triple expansion steam engine driving one propeller, rated at 1,200 horsepower (890 kW). The tugboat had a maximum speed of 15 knots (28 km/h; 17 mph).

== History ==
Foundation Franklin was built as HMS Frisky by John Lewis and Sons Shipbuilding at their yard in Aberdeen, Scotland, in 1918. Given the yard number 67, Frisky was launched and completed in August 1918. She was designed to move capital ships, and operate in rough weather. The ship was commissioned in early 1919, but the end of World War I removed the need for Frisky by the Royal Navy. She was used to tow warships to Scapa Flow until being laid up. In 1924, the ship was sold and retaining her named, performed towing work on the Rhine River and in the Baltic Sea. Frisky was later purchased by a German project in 1927 intending to tow barges across the Atlantic Ocean to Argentina and renamed SS Gustavo Ipland, but the project fell through. Gustavo Ipland then was laid up until 1930.

The ship was purchased in January 1930 at Hamburg, Germany by Foundation Maritime representative Captain James Sutherland. Brought to Southampton for further refit and inspection, she was registered under the Canadian Red Ensign and given the name Foundation Franklin. Brought to Foundation Maritime headquarters in Montreal, Quebec, Canada in 1931, the tug was further refitted by Halifax Shipyards for Atlantic salvage service.

After a few salvage jobs based along the Saint Lawrence River, Foundation Franklin established a homeport at Halifax, Nova Scotia for the rest of her career. One of the most successful and hard-working vessels of her type, Foundation Franklin carried out many remarkable rescue and salvage exploits. She continued to operate in the salvage role until 1948, when, during the tow of the vessel Arosa a hurricane damaged the ship beyond economical repair. The ship was broken up for scrap at Halifax which was completed on 4 April 1949.

Her bell, bearing her original Royal Navy name Frisky, was saved from the scrapyard and used at the Foundation Wharf to summon crews to successor rescue tugs when vessels were in distress. The bell has continued to reside at offices beside the company's wharf through successive ownership changes. Today it is owned by Svitzer Canada Limited which continues to operate tugs from Foundation Franklin's old wharf. A plaque beside the wharf on the Halifax Waterfront Boardwalk commemorates her many rescues. The Maritime Museum of the Atlantic preserved Foundation Franklin's bridge and engine room clocks as well as several models and the tug's heavy salvage tackle. Foundation Franklin was the centrepiece of a special tug exhibit which opened at the museum in 2009 displaying many pieces of her original equipment and her original bell on loan from Svitzer Canada.
