= Angus McGill Mowat =

Canadian librarian

Angus McGill Mowat B.A., M.A.
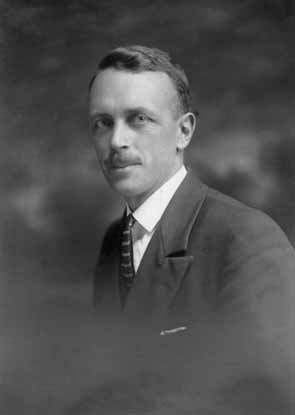
- Mowat c. 1930
- Born: Angus McGill Mowat; November 19, 1892; Trenton, Ontario, Canada
- Died: September 21, 1977 (aged 84); Northport, Ontario, Canada
- Resting place: Northport, Ontario
- Education: Queen's University, University of Saskatchewan
- Occupations: Author, soldier, librarian
- Spouse: Helen (Thomson) Mowat
- Partner: Barbara Hutchinson
- Children: Farley Mowat, John Mowat, Rosemary Mowat
- Relatives: John Mowat, John Bower Mowat, Farley Mowat, Claire Mowat, John McDonald Mowat, Sir Oliver Mowat
- Writing career
- Language: English
- Genre: Novel
- Military career
- Relatives: John McDonald Mowat, Farley Mowat
- Allegiance: Canada
- Branch: Canadian Army
- Service years: 1914–1917 (wounded), 1940–1944
- Rank: Major
- Nickname: Squib
- Unit: The Hastings and Prince Edward Regiment
- Conflicts: World War I : Vimy Ridge, World War II
- Awards: 1914–15 Star; British War Medal; Victory Medal; 1939–1945 Star; Defence Medal; Canadian Volunteer Service Medal; War Medal 1939–1945

Angus McGill Mowat, B.A., M.A., (November 19, 1892 – September 21, 1977) was a Canadian librarian who initiated and contributed to the continuing improvement of the library systems in Saskatoon and Ontario, from the 1920s through to the 1960s.

During his post World War I career he held a number of positions as chief librarian at Trenton, Belleville, Windsor, and Saskatoon, before being appointed in 1937 as Chief Librarian and Inspector of Public Libraries for the province of Ontario. He remained head of the provincial library office – a part of the Ministry of Education – until his retirement in 1960. He was a dynamic and positive force for library progress in Ontario, especially his advocacy for county and regional library service in rural and northern parts of the province.

Throughout his career he encouraged better quality collections for adults and children, professional staffing and library training, the necessity for improved finances, more efficient management by trustees and librarians, and upgraded or new buildings. He believed strongly that the 'personal touch' was essential for library service and that local effort, supplemented by provincial assistance, was the key ingredient in advancing local library development. His personal efforts to establish a public library at Moose Factory stimulated improvements for aboriginal library service on reservations throughout Canada.

== Early life and education ==
The son of Robert McGill Mowat and Mary Jones, Angus was a member of the Trenton High School Cadet Corps, graduating and then attending Queen's University in Kingston, as part of the Canadian Officer Training Corps from 1912 until 1914. Post World War I, Angus finally graduated with a Bachelor of Arts degree in 1931 (after taking part-time courses from 1926 to 1931). In 1926, Angus received his Diploma from Library Training School from the Ontario Department of Education, Toronto. Angus received a Masters degree in English from the University of Saskatchewan in 1935.

Of significance, his grandfather was John Bower Mowat, a noted professor at Queen's University. His great-grandfather, John Mowat was also one of the founders of Queen's. His uncle was Major John McDonald Mowat, whom also served in World War I. And the politician Sir Oliver Mowat was his great uncle.

== War service ==
Angus joined No. 6 Company of the Canadian Military Engineers in August 1914 – part of the Canadian Expeditionary Force – attested for overseas service in early November 1914 and was later commissioned a 2nd Lieutenant in the 4th Battalion in 1917. He served in France and Belgium, and was wounded badly in his right arm at the Battle of Vimy Ridge, returning to Canada late in 1917.

Angus joined the Hastings and Prince Edward Regiment in 1921 as a Cadet Corps Officer until July 1928. When he left Trenton, Angus joined the Reserve of Officers as a Major on 23 July 1928.

From 1940 until 1944 Angus Mowat was a Major in the Hasty P's and was in charge of the Trenton Armouries – which was also his father's hardware store. He was also a Liaison and Recruiting Officer for this Kingston Military District until 1944, and often rode dispatch between Toronto, Kingston and Ottawa on a Harley-Davidson motorcycle.

== Post-war ==
Angus Mowat was appointed Chief Librarian of Trenton, Ontario on 16 July 1922 after the retirement of Mrs. Pattee. Next he became Chief Librarian of Belleville in 1928. Angus was then made Chief Librarian of Windsor in 1930, followed with the position of Chief Librarian of Saskatoon in 1932 until July 1937 when he and his family moved back to Ontario, settling in Richmond Hill.

In 1937 he took the position of the first Inspector of Public Libraries for the Province of Ontario which he held until 1948 – interrupted by his service in the second war – when he was promoted to Director of Public Libraries for Ontario. He held that position until 1959 when his title was changed to Director of the Provincial Library Service. He retired to Port Hope, Ontario in 1960 where he became very active with the Port Hope Public Library and was a trustee for several years on the local library board..

Positions:

- 1922–28 Chief Librarian, Trenton, ON.
- 1928–30 Chief Librarian, Belleville, ON.
- 1930–32 Chief Librarian, Windsor, ON.
- 1932–37 Chief Librarian, Saskatoon, SK.
- 1937–47 Inspector of Public Libraries, ON.
- 1948–59 Director of Public Libraries, ON.
- 1959–60 Director of the Provincial Library Service, ON.

Prior to World War II he wrote his first novel, Then I'll Look Up (1938), and after the war his second, Carrying Place (1944) both published by Reginald-Saunders, Toronto. After his second novel, he decided that writing was not his forte, and focused on his upgrading of the library system.

His son is celebrated Canadian author Farley Mowat, who often fondly wrote about Angus in his books.

He had a lifelong love of boats and sailing them. From 1968 to 1971 he painstakingly restored the wreck of a boat he had seen under construction in Trenton as a boy in 1908, originally called the Scott Hutcheson. The boat is now in the Marine Museum of the Great Lakes at Kingston's collection and is called The Black Angus in homage. Late in his life became a good friend of the poet, Al Purdy, and was the subject of the National Film Board short documentary Angus in 1971.

Angus Mowat died at Northport, Ontario on 21 September 1977.

== Publications ==
- Books:
  - Mowat, Angus M. (1938) – Then I'll Look Up. Toronto: Reginald Saunders, 1938. [novel]
  - Mowat, Angus M. (1944) – Carrying Place. Toronto: Reginald Saunders, 1944. [novel]
- Papers:
  - Mowat, Angus M. (1923). "Better Reading and How to Attain It," Ontario Library Review 8, 1 (Aug. 1923), 3–6.
  - Mowat, Angus M. (1929). "Adult Education," Proceedings of Ontario Library Association Annual Meeting (1929), 12–16.
  - Mowat, Angus M. (1932). "The Passage Over," Queen's Quill 1 (March 1932), 5–12. [short story]
  - Mowat, Angus M. (1933). "Panic,"Canadian Forum13 (Aug. 1933), 423–27. [short story]
  - Mowat, Angus M. (1934). "Jury-Rig in the Canadian Northwest," Library Journal 59 (15 June 1934), 503–05.
  - Mowat, Angus M. (1936). "Ex Libris: Saskatoon," Queen's Quarterly 43 (Summer 1936), 196–200.
  - Mowat, Angus M. (1938). "Dead, but Not Yet Taken Away," OLR 22, 1 (Feb.1938), 2–5.
  - Mowat, Angus M. (1938). "Vulture on Education," Saturday Night 53 (2 April 1938), 2–3.
  - Mowat, Angus M. (1938). "They Who Do the Job," OLR 22, 3 (Aug. 1938), 170–72.
  - Mowat, Angus M. (1938). "Some Library Experiences in the West," OLR 24, 3 (Aug. 1938), 200–1.
  - Mowat, Angus M. (1939). "Co-Operative Libraries," OLR 23, 1 (Feb. 1939), 2–5. [CBL radio address, 26 Nov. 1938]
  - Mowat, Angus M. (1939). "The Great James Bay Raid," Saturday Night 55 (9 Dec. 1939), 7. [fictional war news]
  - Mowat, Angus M. (1940). "Report on Inspection of Certain Military Camp Libraries," OLR 24, 1 (Feb. 1940), 3–7.
  - Mowat, Angus M. (1940). "School and Library Co-Operative Schemes in Ontario," OLR 24, 1 (Feb. 1940), 17–23.
  - Mowat, Angus M. (1940). "Simplified Cataloguing and Classification," OLR 24, 2 (May 1940), 136–37.
  - Mowat, Angus M. (1942). "Soldiers Can Read," OLR 26, 1 (Feb. 1942), 9–10.
  - Mowat, Angus M. (1944). The Public Library, Why You Need It, How to Start It, How to Keep It Going. Toronto: T. E. Bowman, 1944. [2nd rev. ed. issued in 1946 by Dept. of Education]
  - Mowat, Angus M. (1946). "The Royal Commission on Education," OLR 30, 1 (Feb. 1946), 5–6.
  - Mowat, Angus M. (1946). "Glory Be! The Canadian Library Association-Association canadienne des bibliothèques," OLR 30, 3 (Aug. 1946), 227–56. [personal record of CLA's first conference]
  - Mowat, Angus M. (1947). "On Human Worthlessness," Saturday Night 62 (14 June 1947), 48.
  - Mowat, Angus M. (1947). "County Libraries of Ontario," OLR 31, 2 (May 1947), 160–62.
  - Mowat, Angus M. (1947). "The Books Drive on," OLR 31, 4 (Nov. 1947): 351–54.
  - Mowat, Angus M. (1947). "County Libraries: Amendment to Public Libraries Act," OLR 31, 3 (Aug. 1947), 265–67.
  - Mowat, Angus M. (1947). "Librarians Short Course," OLR 31, 3 (Aug. 1947), 325–26.
  - Mowat, Angus M. (1950). The Public Library in Ontario; a Handbook for Its Establishment. Toronto: Public Libraries Branch, Ontario Department of Education, 1950. [3rd ed.]
  - Mowat, Angus M. (1954). "Children—A Dangerous Gap," OLR 38, 4 (Nov. 1954), 299–301.
  - Mowat, Angus M. (1956). "Creating New Local Service in Canada," Library Trends 4 (Spring 1956), 388–98.
  - Mowat, Angus M. (1959). "On the Personal Side," OLR 43, 1 (Feb. 1959), 4–5.
  - Mowat, Angus M. (1959). "A Word to the Wise," OLR 43, 2 (May 1959), 119–21.

== Awards ==
The Angus Mowat Award of Excellence was established by the Province of Ontario in 1985 for public libraries in recognition of excellence in public library service. It is given annually to projects that demonstrate an innovative application or methodology which other libraries might use as a model and which has resulted in the achievement of improved library service.
