= John McDonald Mowat =

Canadian politician

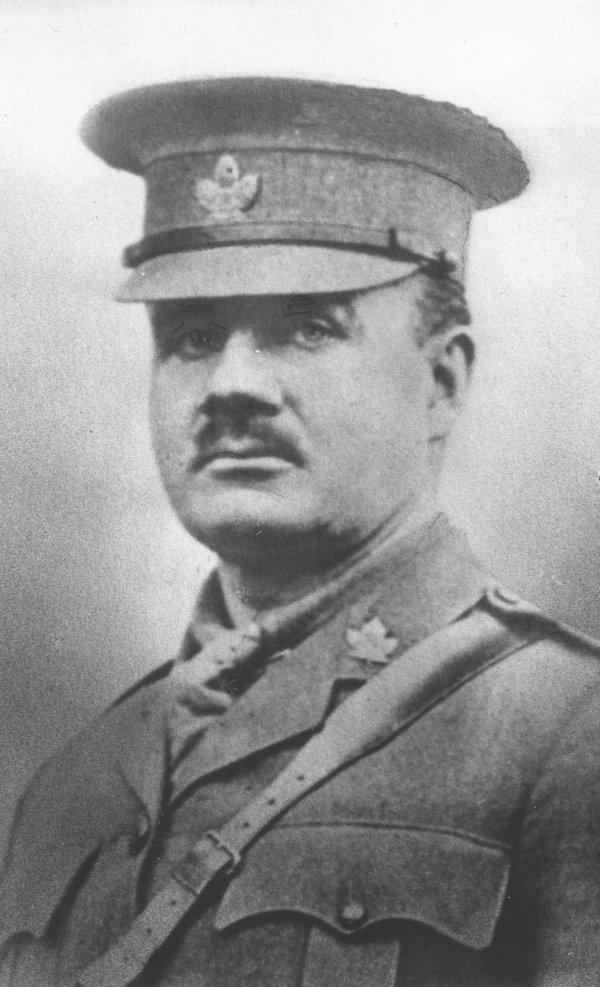
- Born: John McDonald Mowat; February 17, 1872; Kingston, Ontario, Canada
- Died: October 7, 1916 (aged 44); Vimy, France, World War I
- Resting place: Kingston, Ontario
- Education: Queen's University
- Occupations: Lawyer, soldier
- Relatives: John Mowat, John Bower Mowat, Angus McGill Mowat, Farley Mowat, Sir Oliver Mowat
- Writing career
- Language: English
- Military career
- Relatives: Angus McGill Mowat
- Allegiance: Canada
- Branch: Canadian Army
- Service years: 1914–1916 (his death)
- Rank: Major
- Units: Fourth Battalion, First Division Canadian Expeditionary Force
- Conflicts: Battle of Vimy Ridge

John McDonald Mowat (February 17, 1872 – October 7, 1916) was a lawyer and politician in Ontario, Canada. He served as mayor of Kingston from 1906 to 1907.

Known as Major John, the son of John Bower Mowat and Emma McDonald, he was called to the Ontario bar in 1898. Mowat practised law in Kingston and later in Vancouver, British Columbia. He ran unsuccessfully for the Kingston seat in the Canadian House of Commons in 1911, losing to William Folger Nickle. He went overseas as a Major with a Vancouver regiment during World War I and was killed in action at the age of 44.

His nephew Angus McGill Mowat also served in World War I, and his great-nephew is Canadian author Farley Mowat.

His name is inscribed on the Vimy Memorial.
