= Salvage tug =

Specialized type of tugboat

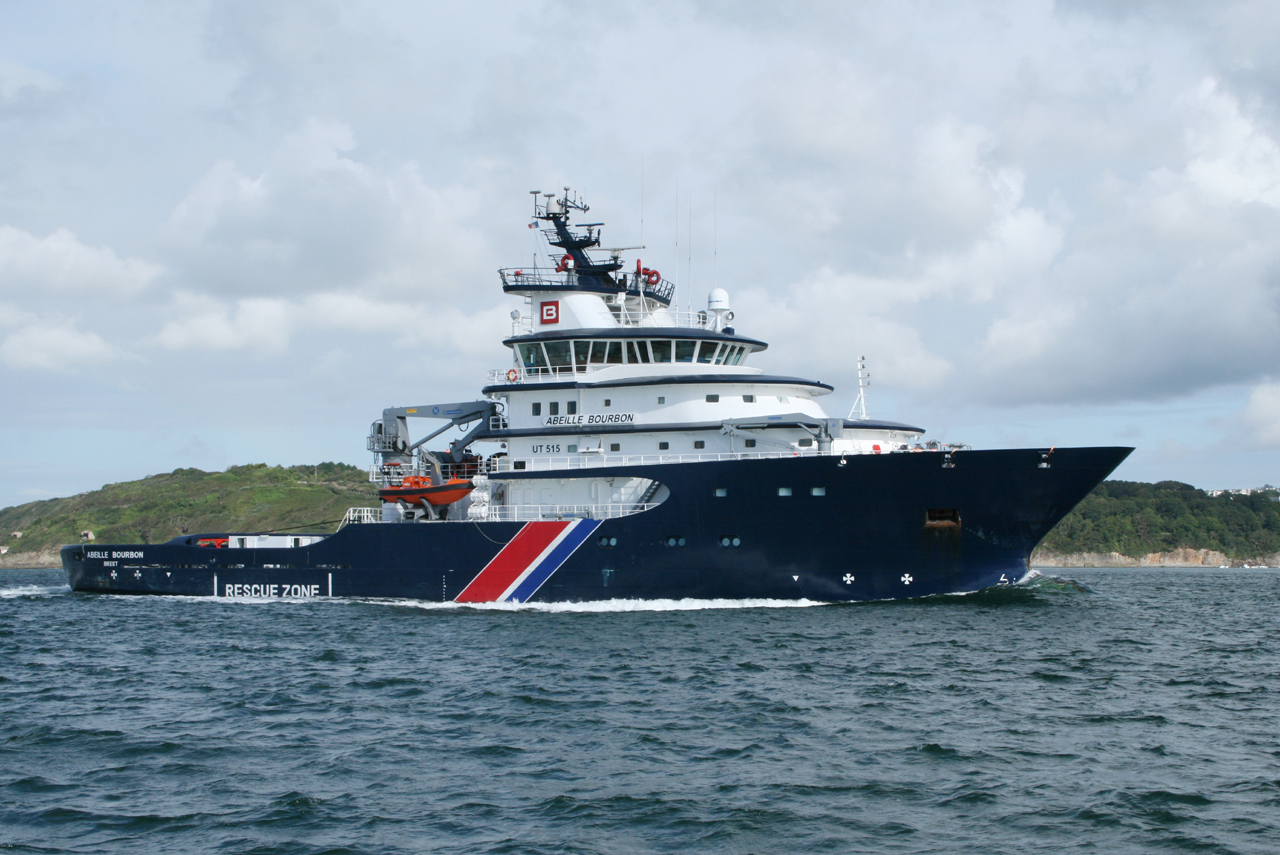
French salvage tug Abeille Bourbon which also serves as an emergency tow vessel (ETV)

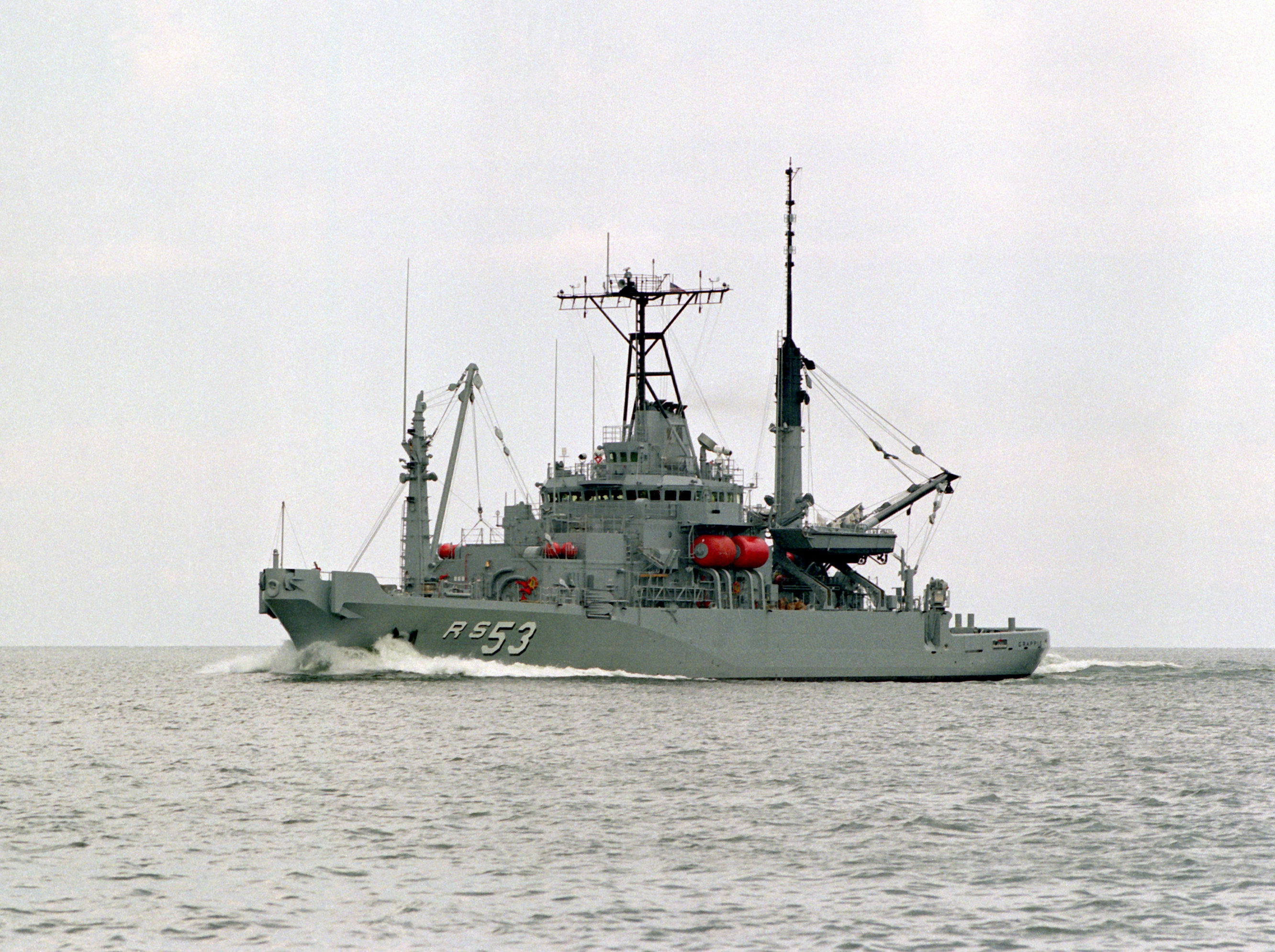
USNS Grapple, an example of modern naval rescue and salvage ship

A salvage tug, also known historically as a wrecking tug, is a specialized type of tugboat that is used to rescue ships that are in distress or in danger of sinking, or to salvage ships that have already sunk or run aground.

== Overview ==
Few tugboats have ever been truly fully dedicated to salvage work; most of the time, salvage tugs operate towing barges, platforms, ships, or performing other utility tugboat work.

Tugs fitted out for salvage are found in small numbers around the globe, with higher concentrations near areas with both heavy shipping traffic and hazardous weather conditions.

Salvage tugs are used by specialized crew experienced in salvage operations (salvors). Their particular equipment includes:

- extensive towing provisions and extra tow lines/cables, with provisions for towing from both bow and stern and at irregular angles
- extra cranes
- firefighting gear
  - deluge systems
  - hoses
  - nozzles
- mechanical equipment such as:
  - common mechanical repair parts
  - compressed air gear
  - diving equipment
  - steel for hull patches
  - welding equipment
- pumps

== Modern development ==
The total demand for salvage tug services is significantly down from its peaks in the years around World War II.

The increasing sensitivity of societies and legal systems to environmental damage and the increasing size of ships has to some extent offset the decline in the number of salvage operations undertaken. Accidents such as major oil tanker groundings or sinkings may require extensive salvage efforts to try to minimize the environmental damage such as that caused by the Exxon Valdez oil spill, or the Amoco Cadiz and Torrey Canyon disasters.

== In popular culture ==
=== In film ===
- The Key, based on a novel by Jan de Hartog, is about WWII Admiralty tug operations.
- In 1943, Jacques Cousteau's team made the film Épaves (Shipwrecks).
- Ghost Ship is a film about an ocean liner which disappeared in mysterious circumstances and is discovered by a maritime salvage contractor.

=== In television ===
- Shipwreck Men (2013) is a reality TV series that follows crews who salvage and raise wrecked vessels.

=== In literature ===
- Farley Mowat's historical books The Grey Seas Under and The Serpent's Coil detail North Atlantic salvage operations in the 1930s, 1940s, and 1950s, conducted by salvage tugs operated by the firm Foundation Maritime.
- Wilbur Smith's 1978 novel Hungry as the Sea is a tale about the master of a salvage tugboat and her operations

== See also ==
- Admiralty tug – Type of tugboat
- Anchor handling tug supply vessel – Type of supply vessel
- Emergency tow vessel – Type of ship used for towing disabled vessels across high seas to safe waters
- Fireboat – Firefighting vessel
- Marine salvage – Recovering a ship or cargo after a maritime casualty
- Rescue and salvage ship – Type of military salvage tug
- Tugboat – Boat that maneuvers other vessels by pushing or towing them
