= Harvest (1967 film) =

1967 film

- Produced by: Carroll Ballard
- Distributed by: U.S. Information Agency
- Release date: 1967
- Country: United States
- Language: English

Harvest is a 1967 American documentary film written, produced, and directed by Carroll Ballard for the US Information Agency. It was nominated for an Academy Award for Best Documentary Feature. The film portrays the American farm and farmer at harvest time, beginning in Texas with the first cutting of winter wheat, and following the season north to the Canada–United States border. It was narrated by John Carter.

== See also ==
- List of American films of 1967
