= And No Birds Sang =

1979 autobiographical book by Farley Mowat

- Author: Farley Mowat
- Language: English
- Genre: Autobiography, World War II
- Published: 1979 (rev. 2012) (Little, Brown)
- Publication place: Canada
- Pages: 219
- ISBN: 0-316-58695-1
- Dewey Decimal: 811.M683
- LC Class: 79-23231

And No Birds Sang (published in 1979, revised in 2012) is Canadian author Farley Mowat's autobiographical account of his military service as a junior Canadian infantry officer in the United Kingdom and Italy during World War II. The book describes Mowat's transformation from a young man hoping to share the perceived glory of his father's generation's victory in The Great War to a combat veteran struggling to cope with the seemingly unending loss of his friends.

After enduring a year of training in Canada as he chafed to be sent overseas, Mowat arrived in England in July 1942. There he spent another year training, seeking adventure by unauthorized experimentation with unexploded bombs dropped by German bombers. His combat experience began with the Allied invasion of Sicily. After individually describing the deaths of his friends lost during the first six months of the Allied advance northward into Italy, e.g. at the bloody Battle of Ortona, Mowat ends his story weeping by the stretcher of an unconscious friend with an enemy bullet in his head as the optimism of youth is replaced by despair.

== Reception ==
Military historians focused on statistics and timing have criticized inaccuracies in Mowat's perception-based recollections of the events in which he was involved. Others have recognized the 35-year delay in preparing such vivid recollections for publication as evidence of slow recovery from combat stress reactions. Information available to soldiers during combat is limited and may be distorted for behavioral motivation. Combat losses over several months of fighting demoralize surviving soldiers trained to fight for their buddies.
