= Owls in the Family =

1961 novel by Farley Mowat

- First edition
- Author: Farley Mowat
- Language: English
- Genre: Children's
- Publisher: Little, Brown & Co
- Publication date: 1961
- Publication place: Canada
- Pages: 236
- ISBN: 978-0-316-58641-2

Owls in the Family is a novel by Farley Mowat, first published in 1961. Like many of Mowat's novels it focuses on the relationship between a child and their pets, in this case the pets being two horned owls. It draws on Mowat's own experiences as a child in rural Canada. Mutt, the dog from Mowat's other book, The Dog Who Wouldn't Be (1957) makes a brief appearance. The novel is considered a Canadian classic.

== Plot summary ==
Billy is a boy who resides in Saskatoon, Saskatchewan who brings home numerous animals and spends time with his two best friends, Bruce and Murray. Billy winds up finding two great horned owls, which join his larger pet collection. The first bird, Wol, is larger and lighter in colour with a bold personality and was found by Billy and his friends under a bush after a storm. Soon afterward, Billy finds Weeps, a smaller mottled brown owl in a barrel filled with oil. When Billy witnesses children throwing stones at Weeps, who is unable to fly, he trades his scout knife for him. Unlike Wol, Weeps has an anxious disposition and sits on the handlebars of Billy's bicycle due to his inability to fly.

Billy has a number of adventures with Wol and Weeps, including tough times and happy moments. When Billy and his family move to Toronto, Ontario, he entrusts the owls to Bruce.

== Characters ==
- Billy: A boy who adopts Wol and Weeps; the protagonist
- Wol: An owl found under a bush after a chinook and best friend
- Weeps: An owl being hit with rocks by older children in an oil barrel before being rescued by Billy
- Bruce and Murray: Billy's friends
- Mr. Miller: A teacher who wants to get pictures of owls in a tree
- Ophelia: The former maid of Billy, finds Wol in Billy's room
- Rex: Bruce's dog
- Mutt: Billy's dog
- Mother: Billy's mother
- Dad: Billy's father
