= The Curse of the Viking Grave =

1966 novel by Farley Mowat

- First US edition
- Author: Farley Mowat
- Illustrator: Chloe
- Language: English
- Genre: Children's
- Publisher: McClelland & Stewart (Canada); Little, Brown & Co (US)
- Publication date: June 1966
- Publication place: Canada
- Pages: 243
- ISBN: 978-0-316-58633-7
- Preceded by: Lost in the Barrens

The Curse of the Viking Grave is a children's novel by Farley Mowat, first published in 1966. It is a sequel to the award-winning Lost in the Barrens. Set in the Canadian north, it is a novel of adventure and survival, with much information about the northern land and its peoples.

== Main characters ==
- Jamie Macnair, 15-year-old Scottish Canadian orphan
- Peetyuk Anderson, the son of an English trapper and an Ihalmiut woman
- Awasin Meewasin, the son of the chief of the Crees at Thanout Lake
- Angeline Meewasin, Awasin's sister, the daughter of the chief of the Crees

== Plot summary ==
The novel is set in the northern Manitoban forests and in the Barrens to the north. Jamie, Awasin, and Peetyuk divide their time between studying with Jamie's uncle, Angus Macnair, and trapping in the woods. When the Chipeweyan camp nearby succumbs to deadly influenza, the boys help with supplies and nurse the survivors, while Angus travels south in search of medical help. However, Angus contracts pneumonia on the journey and is hospitalized. Jamie is anxious both to obtain money for Angus's treatment and to avoid being placed with Child Welfare. He prepares to return to the Viking tomb he discovered (in Lost in the Barrens) which he believes may contain valuable archaeological relics.

The boys and Awasin's sister, Angeline, set out to the still frozen north by dog sled and cariole and eventually meet up with Peetyuk's people, with whom they stay until the thaw. They realize that the Ihalmiut are struggling to survive, and so they decide that most of the profits from the grave should go to help them. The medicine man tells them the story of the heroic Viking known as Koonar and claims that a curse will descend on anyone who disturbs his rest. Defying the curse, Jamie uncovers a sword, a soapstone box, and other ancient pieces. Planning to take the artifacts to Churchill, the travelers set out again, this time by canoe, and brave the treacherous Big River which leads to Hudson Bay.

== Film adaptation ==
Lost in the Barrens II: The Curse of the Viking Grave, a film based on the novel, was made for television in 1991, directed by Michael Scott. It was described as having the look and feel of a 1930s Saturday matinee adventure film.
