= Claire Mowat =

Canadian writer and environmentalist

- Born: Claire Angel Wheeler; 5 February 1933 (age 93); Toronto, Ontario, Canada
- Education: Graphic designer
- Alma mater: Havergal College, Ontario College of Art & Design
- Occupations: Author, environmentalist, philanthropist
- Spouse: Farley Mowat
- Relatives: Angus McGill Mowat
- Writing career
- Language: English
- Period: 1983–present
- Genres: Memoir, young adult fiction
- Notable work: The Outport People

Claire Angel Mowat (born 5 February 1933) is a Canadian writer and environmentalist.

== Personal life ==
Born on February 5, 1933, Mowat (née Wheeler) was raised and educated in Toronto, Ontario. She graduated from Havergal College and the Ontario College of Art & Design as a Graphic designer and was married to the late author Farley Mowat. The couple divided their time between Ontario, and Cape Breton, Nova Scotia.

== Career ==
Mowat began writing memoirs in the 1960s, leading in 1983 to her first book The Outport People, about the five years she and husband Farley spent at the start of their marriage in the outport Newfoundland community of Burgeo. Her second book Pomp and Circumstances (1989) arose from witnessing protocol behind the scenes at the Governor General's residence Rideau Hall in Ottawa. A 2005 memoir Travels with Farley, describes the couple's life in the Magdalen Islands, following the still-birth of their only child. She has also written a trilogy of young adult fiction: The Girl from Away (1992), The French Isles (1994) and Last Summer in Louisbourg (1998).

== Works ==
- The Outport People (1983) published by McClelland & Stewart - ISBN 978-0-7710-6549-1
- Pomp and Circumstances (1989) published by McClelland & Stewart - ISBN 978-0-7710-6548-4
- The Girl from Away (1992) Illustrated by Malcolm Cullen, published by Key Porter Books - ISBN 978-1-55013-428-5
- The French Isles (1994) Illustrated by Huntley Brown, published by Key Porter Books - ISBN 978-1-55013-591-6
- Last Summer in Louisbourg (1998) published by Key Porter Books - ISBN 978-1-55013-941-9, (2012) Nimbus Publishing - ISBN 978-1-77108-065-1, 978-1-55109-910-1
- The Girl from Away Trilogy (2002) published by Key Porter Books - ISBN 9781-55263-489-9
- Travels with Farley (2005) published by Key Porter Books - ISBN 978-1-55263-714-2, (2015) Pottersfield Press - ISBN 978-1-89742-674-6
