= Key Porter Books =

Publishing company based in Toronto

- Status: Defunct
- Founded: 1979
- Founder: Anna Porter
- Country of origin: Canada
- Headquarters location: Toronto, Ontario
- Publication types: books
- Official website: www.keyporter.com

Key Porter Books was a book publishing company based in Toronto, Ontario, Canada. Founded in 1979 by Anna Porter, later well known as a writer, the company specialized in Canadian non-fiction, although it published some fiction too. It ceased operations in January 2011.

== Writers ==
Key Porter published books by authors including Farley Mowat, Claire Mowat, Allan Fotheringham, Conrad Black, Erika Ritter, Pamela Wallin, George Bowering, Diane Francis, Joan Barfoot, Maude Barlow, Stevie Cameron, Brian Lee Crowley, Dennis Lee, Mark Bourrie, Paul Cellucci, Jean Chrétien, M.A.C. Farrant and Cleo Paskal.

== Business ==
Key Porter Books was founded in 1979 by Anna Porter and Key Publishers Limited of Toronto, Ontario.

Porter sold her stake in 2004 and a controlling interest was acquired that July by the Canadian publishing company H.B. Fenn; Harold Fenn, chairman.

The head office was located on the 10th floor of the historic Lumsden Building at 6 Adelaide Street East in downtown Toronto until September/October 2010, when Key Porter laid off 11 of 17 employees and relocated to a commercial business park in Bolton, Ontario (in the northwest of Greater Toronto). There it shared offices with H.B. Fenn Company Limited and Fenn Publishing Limited.

On 7 January 2011, Key Porter publisher Jordan Fenn announced the suspension of operations and laid off the remaining staff. At the time, it was reported that all book releases would continue as scheduled via H.B. Fenn.
