= Never Cry Wolf (film) =

1983 film by Carroll Ballard

- Theatrical release poster
- Directed by: Carroll Ballard
- Screenplay by: Curtis Hanson; Sam Hamm; Richard Kletter
- Based on: Never Cry Wolf by Farley Mowat
- Produced by: Lewis Allen; Jack Couffer; Joseph Strick
- Starring: Charles Martin Smith; Brian Dennehy
- Cinematography: Hiro Narita
- Edited by: Michael Chandler; Peter Parasheles
- Music by: Mark Isham
- Production companies: Walt Disney Pictures; Amarok Productions Ltd.
- Distributed by: Buena Vista Distribution Co.
- Release dates: October 6, 1983 (Toronto); October 7, 1983 (United States)
- Running time: 105 minutes
- Country: United States
- Languages: English; Inuktitut
- Budget: $11 million
- Box office: $29.6 million

Never Cry Wolf is a 1983 American drama film directed by Carroll Ballard. The film is an adaptation of Farley Mowat's 1963 "subjective non-fiction" book. The film stars Charles Martin Smith as a government biologist sent into the wilderness to study the caribou population. The decline of the caribou population is believed to be caused by wolves, although no one has seen a wolf kill a caribou. The film also features Brian Dennehy and Zachary Ittimangnaq.

Produced by Walt Disney Pictures, Never Cry Wolf was the first Disney film to be released by the studio under its new name. The film was released in limited theatres on October 7, 1983, and went wider on January 27, 1984.

== Plot ==
Tyler, a young and naïve Canadian biologist, is assigned by the government to travel to the isolated Canadian Arctic wilderness and study why the area's caribou population is declining. He has instructions to kill a wolf and examine its stomach contents for caribou tissue. Tyler hires pilot Rosie Little to take him to the Arctic in his bush plane. After landing at the destination, Rosie leaves Tyler in the middle of a frozen lake. A passing Inuk named Ootek shelters him as he orients himself to his new surroundings.

Alone, Tyler divides his days between research and survival. He soon encounters two wolves that he names George and Angeline, who have pups, and seem as curious of him as he is of them. He and the wolves begin social exchanges, including the marking of territory, producing trust and respect between them. Noticing that they have not eaten any caribou and only mice, he begins a side experiment of eating only mice for protein sustenance.

Another Inuk named Mike encounters Tyler. He tells Tyler that he is self-conscious about missing most of his teeth. Tyler discovers that Mike is a wolf hunter, killing for pelts to sell to make a living. Tyler demonstrates a trick he has learned: by playing certain notes on his bassoon, he can imitate a wolf howl, calling other wolves in.

Autumn nears, and Tyler hears that the caribou are migrating south. Ootek takes him on a three-day hike to where the caribou will be, and Tyler observes the wolves make several unsuccessful attacks. He helps drive caribou towards the pack, which takes one down. Tyler takes a bone and samples the marrow, discovering the dead caribou to be diseased. This confirms that the wolves kill only the weaker caribou.

One day Tyler encounters Rosie and two investors, who have bought the lakefront and mountain slope to develop a hotel. Rosie tells him that he is behaving irrationally and offers to fly him out. Tyler refuses, but Rosie promises to visit him in a few days at the camp in case he changes his mind.

Tyler returns to the camp to find things very still. He ventures into the wolves' territory to find the pups cowering in fear and the two adults gone. Rosie's aircraft approaches outside. Believing that Rosie killed George and Angeline, Tyler shouts at him to leave and fires his rifle to scare him away.

Returning to his camp again, Tyler finds Mike in the hut. When Tyler asks about the wolves, Mike admonishes him to focus on his own survival and hints that he knows about Rosie's plans. He flashes new dentures and leaves.

Some time later, as the first snow begins to fall, Tyler plays the wolf call on his bassoon, bringing in other wolves from George and Angeline's pack. He reflects on his time in the wilderness and how he may have helped bring the modern world to this place. Ootek returns, and he and Tyler break camp and trek across the fall tundra to the south, enjoying each other's company.

== Cast ==
- Charles Martin Smith as Tyler, a biologist without any survival skills, yet bold enough to study wolves in their environment.
- Brian Dennehy as Rosie Little, a carefree bush pilot who exploits the region for money.
- Zachary Ittimangnaq as Ootek, an Inuk who helps Tyler survive the wilderness.
- Samson Jorah as Mike, Ootek's adoptive son, caught between his Inuit ways and the modern world.
- Martha Ittimangnaq as Woman, Ootek's wife.
- Hugh Webster (Drunk)

== Production ==
Never Cry Wolf blends the documentary film style with the narrative elements of drama, resulting in a type of docudrama. It was originally written for the screen by Sam Hamm but the screenplay was altered over time and Hamm ended up sharing credit with Curtis Hanson and Richard Kletter. (Note: Never Cry Wolf is the first Walt Disney Pictures film to show naked adult buttocks. The buttocks in question are the buttocks of lead actor Charles Martin Smith.)

The actor Charles Martin Smith, who had previously worked with Disney on films such as No Deposit, No Return and Herbie Goes Bananas, devoted almost three years to Never Cry Wolf. Smith wrote, "I was much more closely involved in that picture than I had been in any other film. Not only acting, but writing and the whole creative process." He also found the process difficult. "During much of the two-year shooting schedule in Canada's Yukon and in Nome, Alaska, I was the only actor present. It was the loneliest film I've ever worked on," Smith said.

=== Filming locations ===
The film locations for Never Cry Wolf included Nome, Alaska, the Yukon Territory, and Atlin, British Columbia, Canada.

== Reception ==
=== Critical response ===
When Never Cry Wolf was released, a review in the Los Angeles Times called the film "... subtle, complex and hypnotic ... triumphant filmmaking!"

Ronald Holloway, film critic of Variety magazine, gave the film a mostly admiring review, and wrote, "For the masses out there who love nature films, and even those who don't, Carroll Ballard's more than fits the commercial bill and should score well too with critical [audiences] on several counts."

Vincent Canby, film critic for The New York Times, wrote, "I find it difficult to accept the fact that the biologist, just after an airplane has left him in the middle of an icy wilderness, in a snowstorm, would promptly get out his typewriter and, wearing woolen gloves, attempt to type up his initial reactions. He called the film "a perfectly decent if unexceptional screen adaptation of Farley Mowat's best-selling book about the author's life among Arctic wolves."

In his retrospective review of the film, Brendon Hanley of Allmovie praised Never Cry Wolf and Smith's performance, writing, "Wolf's protagonist [is] wonderfully played by the reliable character actor Charles Martin Smith... The result is a quirky, deceptively simple meditation on life." The review aggregation website Rotten Tomatoes gives the film a score of 100% based on reviews from nineteen critics, with an average rating of 7.7 out of 10.

According to Northern Exposure co-creator Joshua Brand, Never Cry Wolf was one of two films that inspired that TV show's creation.

=== Awards ===
Wins

- Boston Society of Film Critics Awards: 4th BSFC Award; Best Cinematography, Hiro Narita; 1984.
- Hawaii International Film Festival: Excellence in Cinematography Award, Hiro Narita; 1984.
- Motion Picture Sound Editors: Golden Reel Award; Best Sound Editing – Sound Effects; 1984.
- National Society of Film Critics Awards: NSFC Award Best Cinematography, Hiro Narita; 1984.
- Western Heritage Awards: Bronze Wrangler; Theatrical Motion Picture, Carroll Ballard; 1984.

Nominations

- Academy Awards: Best Sound; Alan Splet, Todd Boekelheide, Randy Thom and David Parker; 1984.

=== Box office ===
The film opened in limited release October 7, 1983 and went into wide circulation January 20, 1984.

The film was in theatres for 192 days (27 weeks) and the total US gross sales were $29,600,000. In its widest release, the film appeared in 540 theatres.

== Comparisons to book ==
There are several differences in the film when compared to Mowat's book. In the book, Ootek and Mike's roles are reversed, Mike is actually Ootek's older brother (Ootek is a teenager) and Ootek, although speaking mostly in Inuktitut, communicates openly with Mowat while Mike is more reserved.

The film adds a more spiritual element to the story while the book was a straightforward story. The film also isolates the characters while in the book, Mowat meets several people from different areas of the Arctic. Also in the book, the wolves are not killed and neither did the bush pilot bring in investors to build a resort.
