= Diane Francis =

American-born Canadian journalist (born 1946)

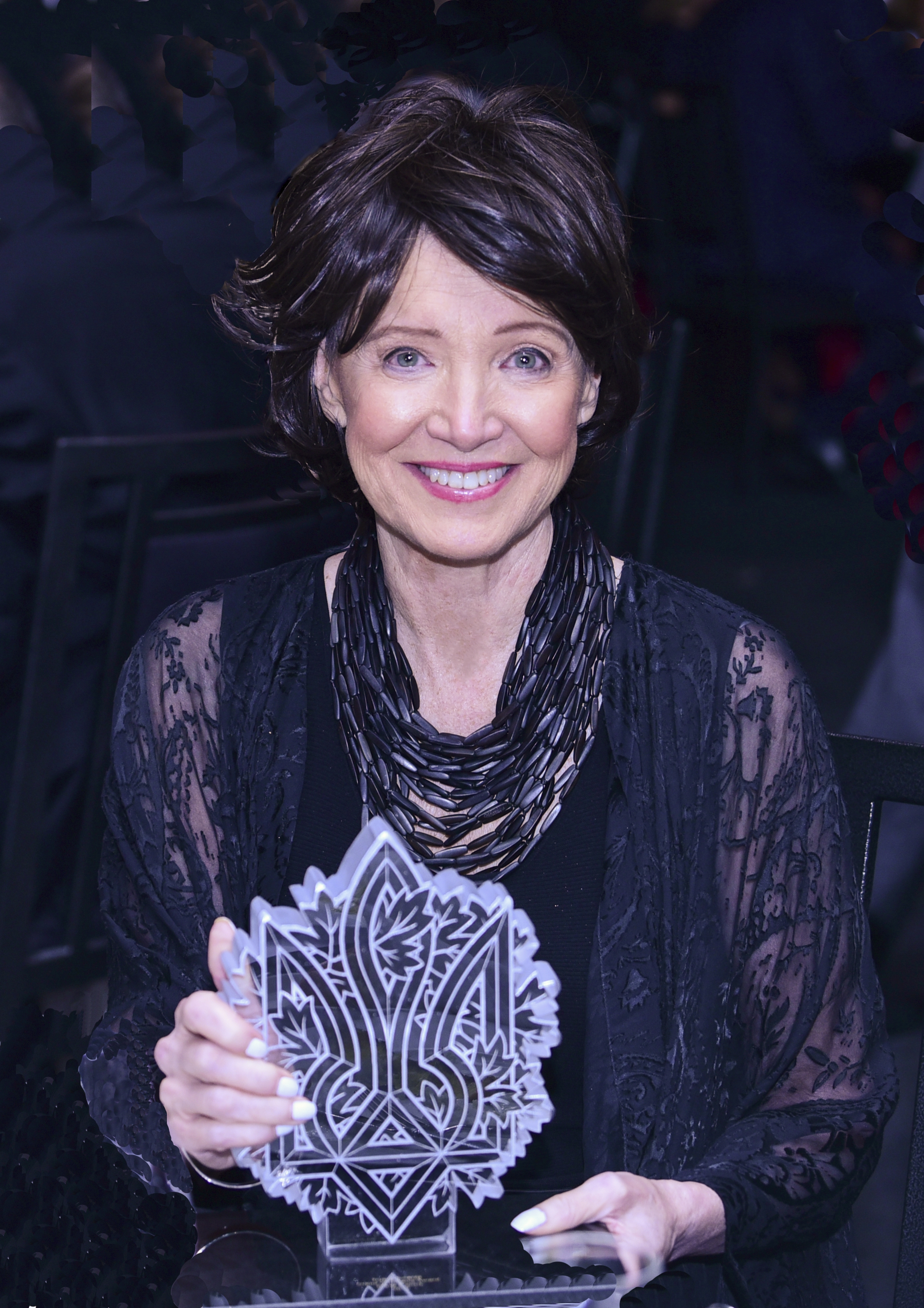
- Francis in 2019
- Born: 14 November 1946 (age 79); Chicago, Illinois, U.S.
- Occupations: Author, editor, journalist
- Known for: Editor, Financial Post

Diane Marie Francis (born 14 November 1946) is a Canadian-American journalist, author, and editor-at-large for the National Post newspaper since 1998.

== Background ==
Francis was born in Chicago, Illinois, on 14 November 1946. She immigrated to Canada in 1966 and became a naturalized Canadian citizen. She is married and has two adult children.

== Career ==
Francis was a reporter and columnist with the Toronto Star from 1981 to 1987, then a columnist and director with the Toronto Sun, Maclean's and the Financial Post in 1987 and the Financial Post's editor from 1991 to 1998, when it was taken over by the National Post and incorporated into it. She has been a columnist and editor-at-large at the National Post since then. She is also a regular contributor to the Atlantic Council, New York Post, the Huffington Post, and the Kyiv Post, as well as newspapers around the world. She is a broadcaster, speaker and author of ten books on Canadian socioeconomic subjects.

Francis was a distinguished professor at the Ted Rogers School of Management at Toronto Metropolitan University (formerly Ryerson University) in Toronto until 2018. She was a visiting fellow at Harvard University's Shorenstein Center in autumn 2005 and has been a media fellow at the World Economic Forum.

She holds an honorary Doctorate of Commerce from the Saint Mary's University (1997), and an Honorary Doctorate from Ryerson University (2013).

== Bibliography ==
- Merger of the Century: Why Canada and America Should Become One Country (2013), HarperCollins
- Who Owns Canada Now (2008), HarperCollins
- Immigration: The Economic Case (2002), Key Porter Books, ISBN 1-55263-532-5
- Underground Nation: The Secret Economy and the Future of Canada (2002), Key Porter Books, ISBN 1-55013-612-7
- BRE-X: The Inside Story – The Stock Swindle That Shocked The World (1998), Seal Books, ISBN 1-55013-913-4
- Fighting for Canada (1996), Key Porter Books, ISBN 1-55013-796-4
- A Matter of Survival: Canada in the 21st Century (1993), Key Porter Books
- The Diane Francis Inside Guide to Canada's 50 Best Stocks (1990), Key Porter Books, ISBN 1-55013-218-0
- Contrepreneurs (1988), Macmillan of Canada, ISBN 0771599153
- Controlling Interest – Who Owns Canada (1986), Macmillan Publishers, ISBN 0-7715-9744-4
