= John Bower Mowat =

- Born: June 8, 1825; Kingston, Ontario, Canada
- Died: July 15, 1900 (aged 75); Kingston, Ontario
- Resting place: Kingston, Ontario
- Education: Queen's University
- Occupations: Professor, Presbyterian minister
- Spouse(s): Janet McGill (1855), Emma McDonald (1861)
- Relatives: John Mowat, John McDonald Mowat, Farley Mowat, Sir Oliver Mowat
- Writing career
- Language: English

John Bower Mowat (June 8, 1825 – July 15, 1900) was a Presbyterian minister and university professor in Ontario, Canada.

John Bower Mowat (known as Professor John), the son of John Mowat and Helen Levack, was born in Kingston, Upper Canada and was educated in Brockville, at Queen's College and at the University of Edinburgh. In 1848, he was appointed catechist to John Machar. Mowat was ordained at Niagara in 1850. He was married twice: first to Janet, the daughter of Reverend Robert McGill, in 1855 and then to Emma, the daughter of John McDonald in 1861. Mowat served as pastor of St. Andrews Presbyterian Church in Niagara from 1850 to 1857. In that year, he was named professor of oriental languages, biblical criticism and church history at Queen's. He served as acting registrar in 1881.

His brother Oliver served as premier of Ontario. His son Robert McGill Mowat was the father of Angus McGill Mowat and the grandfather of Farley Mowat. His son John McDonald Mowat served as mayor of Kingston.

Mowat died at Kingston at the age of 75.
