= Lost in the Barrens =

1956 children's novel by Farley Mowat

- First edition
- Author: Farley Mowat
- Illustrator: Charles Geer
- Language: English
- Genre: Children's
- Publisher: Little, Brown & Co
- Publication date: June 1956
- Publication place: Canada
- Pages: 219
- ISBN: 978-0-316-58638-2
- OCLC: 290007559
- Followed by: The Curse of the Viking Grave

Lost in the Barrens is a 1956 children's novel by Farley Mowat. Later editions used the title Two Against the North.

It won Governor General's Award in 1956 and the Canada Library Association Book of the Year for Children Award in 1958.

== Plot introduction ==
Two Against the North is an adventure story that takes place in northern Manitoba and southwestern North West Territories in 1935. It tells a coming of age tale of two boys in their late teens, one a white boy who has recently lost his parents, the other a Cree boy from a tribe living nearby. The boys embark on a mission to relieve the starvation of a neighbouring village, occupied by the Chipewyans, but due to a series of unfortunate events become trapped above the tree line in Canada's northern Barren Lands during winter. The characters emerge again in Mowat's The Curse of the Viking Grave.

== Plot summary ==
Jamie's parents died in a car accident in Toronto in 1931, and four years later he is under the care of his trapper uncle, Angus Macnair, who lives in Manitoba. Angus has supported Jamie's Saint George's boarding-school fees for a long time, but no longer does now that the fur trade has begun to decline. Thus, Jamie leaves the boarding school to live with his uncle. Jamie makes friends with the Cree Chief's son, Awasin. The Chief thinks a trader is cheating him; so he asks Angus and Jamie to go with him. It is eventually decided that Jamie has to stay in camp with Awasin because Angus's canoe could not hold three people as well as all of the gear. Soon after, a group of Chipewyans come to the Crees for help. The Chipewyans have been starving for days because they could not shoot enough deer the summer before. Awasin's Uncle Soloman is suspicious that the Chipewyans may just be looking for a free handout, and so the boys agree to go with them back to the Chipewyans' camp to verify that they need the supplies. Jamie wants to go, too; so the two and the Chipewyans who came (including Denikazi, their leader) canoe back to the Chipewyan camp. There, Denikazi has a misunderstanding that Jamie and Awasin are going with them on the hunt for the deer. This is how Jamie and Awasin start their journey for the deer hunt out in the barrens. Soon, they go up to the North farther, but they do not find any 'deer' (in the book, deer means barrenland caribou); so Denikazi orders Jamie and Awasin to stay with two young Chipewyans at a certain point until they come back. He adds that they should run, and forget about the camp if they encounter Inuit.

In this book, the Chipewyans and the Crees are deathly afraid of the Eskimos, who live in what some people have called "nothing but a God-forsaken place, the worst place on earth". Denikazi describes it this way: His people went and hunted as far north as they wanted to for deer, for they had guns and the Eskimos did not. Then, the Eskimos got guns and fought back. (Nowadays Eskimos are called 'Inuit', but this was not the case when Mowat wrote his novel, or for decades afterward). While staying with the two young Chipewyan hunters, Jamie decides he wants to take the chance and explore. Awasin does not agree with his idea but later gives in. They go up to see the 'stone house' that one of the two Chipewyans had told them about. They try to find it but unexpectedly meet a whirlpool and barely survive. Gathering what they can salvage from the river and their broken canoe, they have minimal belongings. Since they cannot use the canoe anymore, they are stranded in the barrens. When the two young Chipewyans find out that Awasin and Jamie are gone, they go on searching for them. Their search is abruptly stopped when they catch a glance of an Inuit kayak. As for Jamie and Awasin, they decide to go the way that Denikazi and the other hunters went, so that they can join with them on the journey back. A problem occurs, for one of Denikazi's men sees what he believes is an Inuk and they all flee quietly back. They unknowingly pass by Jamie's and Awasin's camp during the night.

Jamie and Awasin are then forced to overcome a series of obstacles including finding shelter and food and to wait until the summer when they can make the trek back to their home camp with the best chance of survival. They engage in a massive caribou hunt, and are able to build a log cabin and make a comfortable home for themselves. On their attempted return trip, they both become afflicted by snow blindness and are forced to stop the trip and heal up. Then, they decide to return to their cabin. Unfortunately, a blizzard hits and they are forced to seek shelter in an Inuit igloo to survive. They are discovered by an Inuk boy named Peetyuk who offers to help and takes them to his camp, where they learn that the Inuit do not hate the Cree, and are only hostile because they are as afraid of the Cree as the Cree are of them. The boys are able to return home with the help of their new friends, and they make plans to return to their cabin the next summer with Jamie's uncle Angus.
