= Albans Wood =

Nature reserve in Hertfordshire, England

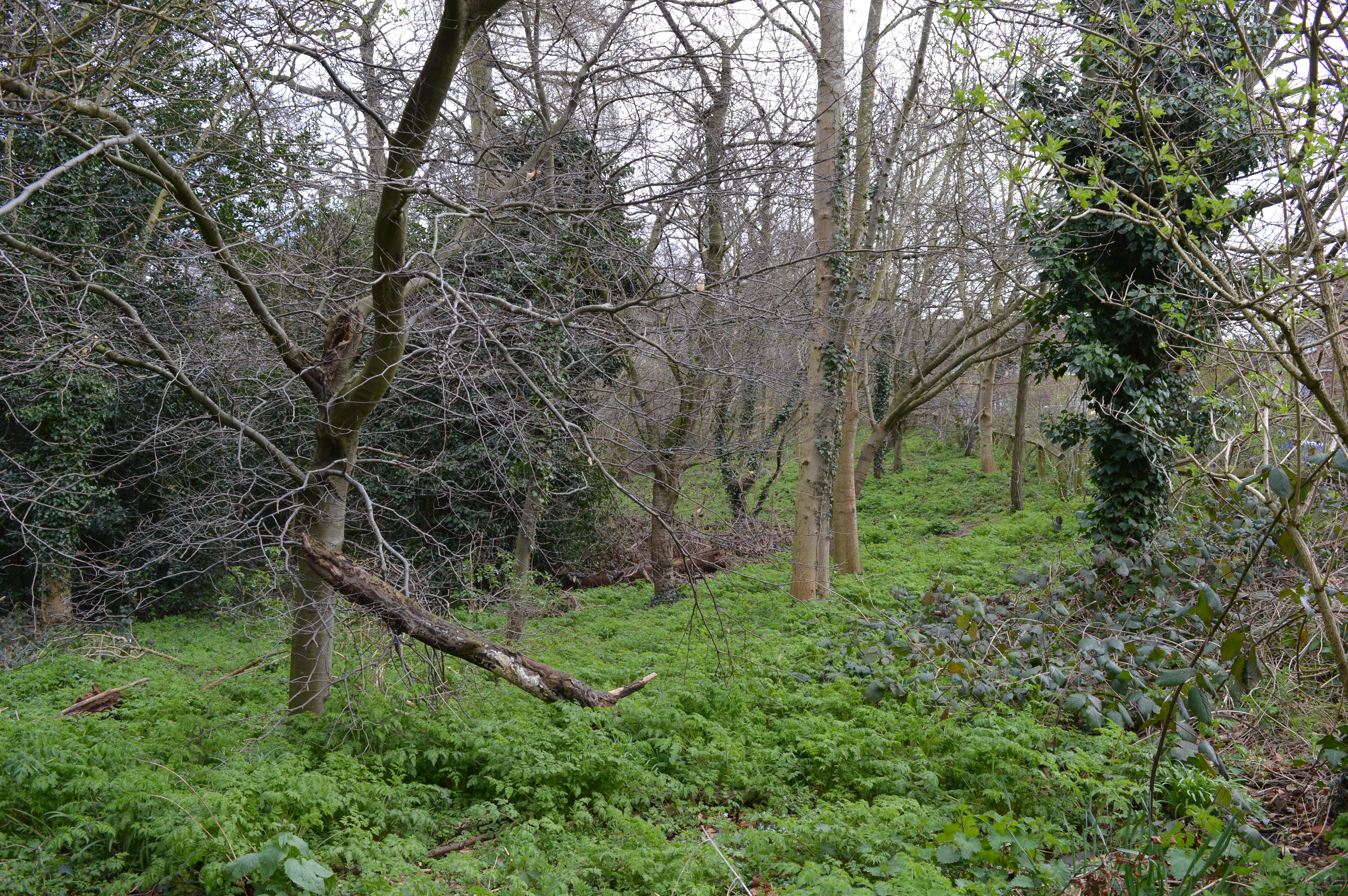
- Colney Heath Local Nature Reserve
- Interactive map of Albans Wood
- Type: Local Nature Reserve
- Location: Watford, Hertfordshire
- Coordinates: 51.6941°N 0.3983°W
- Area: 4.1 hectares (10 acres)
- Manager: Watford Borough Council

Albans Wood is a 4.1 hectares (10 acres) local nature reserve in Watford in Hertfordshire. It is owned and managed by Watford Borough Council.

The site is ancient semi-natural woodland. It is mainly oak with other trees including beech, horse chestnut and sweet chestnut. There are mammals such as muntjac deer and noctule bats, butterflies including purple hairstreak and speckled wood, and birds such as great spotted woodpeckers and nuthatches.

There is access from Sheepcot Lane.
