= People of the Deer =

Canadian author Farley Mowat's first book, published in 1952

- First Edition cover
- Author: Farley Mowat
- Illustrator: Samuel Bryant
- Language: English
- Genre: Travel, sociology
- Published: Feb. 26, 1952 (rev. 1975) (Little, Brown)
- Publication place: Canada
- Pages: 344
- ISBN: 978-0-316-58642-9
- OCLC: 419715
- Dewey Decimal: 917.940049
- LC Class: 52-5023
- Followed by: The Desperate People

People of the Deer (published in 1952, revised in 1975) is Canadian author Farley Mowat's first book, and brought him literary recognition. The book is based upon a series of travels the author undertook in the Canadian barren lands, of the Keewatin Region, Northwest Territories (now the Kivalliq Region, Nunavut, west of Hudson Bay. The most important of these expeditions was in the winter of 1947–48. During his travels Mowat studied the lives of the Ihalmiut, a small population of Inuit, whose existence depended heavily on the large population of caribou in the region. Besides descriptions of nature and life in the Arctic, Mowat's book tells the sad story of how a once prosperous and widely dispersed people slowly dwindled to the brink of extinction through unscrupulous economic interest and lack of understanding.

== Reception ==
The factuality of this book was debated in the House of Commons of Canada in 1953. Mowat was derided as a liar by Jean Lesage (then Minister of Northern Affairs and National Resources) and the existence of the Ihalmiut was questioned. Mowat's account of the famine, epidemics and forced relocation of the Ihalmiut continued to be denied for decades by churches, industry and government. However, the version of the story told in People of the Deer and several subsequent works, has since been vindicated.

As Suzanne Methot states in a review of Mowat's Walking on the Land: "Fact: the Ihalmiut existed, and they were relocated to useless expanses of land no fewer than three times, shunted about by a government intent on building a colonial vision from sea to sea to sea." According to Methot the vilification of Mowat, who was dubbed "Hardly Nowit" and pictured in Saturday Night magazine with a Pinocchio nose, continued into the 1990s. She describes the story told by Mowat as one "of horrifying neglect and outright stupidity on the part of the federal government." Of the controversy surrounding Mowat's epic, Margaret Atwood is quoted as saying:

“People of the Deer was to the support for increased autonomy among northern peoples as Rachel Carson’s Silent Spring was to the environmental movement: a wake-up call, the spark that struck the tinder that ignited the fire from which many subsequent generations of writers and activists have lit their torches, often ignorant of where that spark came from in the first place.

According to Tim Querengesser in an article about the conflicting attitudes toward Mowat, People of the Deer and his later books fueled increasing interest in the North. Some Northerners, such as Jim Bell, editor of the Nunatsiaq News in Iqaluit, agree that Mowat got some facts wrong but believe that his ends justified his means: “There are people alive today who would likely be dead or not even be born if Farley Mowat had not written about the famines in the Keewatin region in the 1950s...That is a legacy that can never be taken away from him.”

== Second edition ==
In the foreword to the 1974 edition of People of the Deer, Mowat addresses the concerns about factuality. He states that, when the first book was published, “it was impossible for me to obtain documentary corroboration for much of the story.” According to Mowat, the “Old Empire” of the North—the missions, the RCMP and the government—held the proof. “I was therefore forced to be somewhat circumspect.” The story without omissions, changed names or distortions of time and space, as presented in The Desperate People—the 1959 follow-up to People of the Deer—“is the correct one.”

== Reviews ==
The New York Times Book Review published a dismissive review on February 24, 1952. The Beaver was quite hostile in its first review, and the Hudson's Bay Company threatened to sue Mowat for allegedly criticizing its trading policies that were detrimental to peoples of the Keewatin Region. The second review, by A. E. Porsild, was equally hostile and questioned the existence of the Ihalmiut. Nonetheless, People of the Deer was generally well received, excerpted in the Atlantic Monthly, and "showered with glowing international reviews."

== Awards ==
The book was awarded the Anisfield-Wolfe Book Award by the Anisfield-Wolfe Foundation in 1953.
