= King George IV Ecological Reserve =

Ecological reserve in Newfoundland and Labrador

Coordinates: 48°10′7″N 57°54′14″W

The King George IV Ecological Reserve, named after King George IV Lake, is a protected area in the Canadian province of Newfoundland and Labrador, on the Island of Newfoundland, about 90 km north of Burgeo. It covers approximately 18.4 square kilometres (7.1 square miles) and is known for preserving the largest undisturbed river-delta system on the island, including the delta of the Lloyd's River System.

It was established in 1984 as a provisional ecological reserve and received full designation in 1997. In 1995, the Nature Conservancy of Canada negotiated with Abitibi-Price for surrender of timber rights and Noranda for surrender of mineral rights in the area.

The La Poile caribou herd uses the reserve as a wintering ground as it offers shelter and feeding areas. Other animals especially birds use the reserve for habitats including Canada geese, black ducks, green-winged teal, American goldeneyes, and ring-necked ducks.

The reserve encompasses a variety of ecosystems, including freshwater marshes, basin bogs, and shore fens. These ecosystems support a diverse range of plant species such as sphagnum moss, grasses, sedges, rushes, cattails, water lilies, and various shrubs. The freshwater marshes within the reserve are particularly notable for their support of waterfowl, as they are rare on the island of Newfoundland.

Access to the Reserve is by foot or canoe only as there are no roads running into the area, though roads to access peripheral areas.
