= The Grey Seas Under =

1958 book by Farley Mowat

- Author: Farley Mowat
- Genre: Non-fiction
- Publication date: 1958
- ISBN: 1-58574-240-6

The Grey Seas Under is a non-fiction book by Canadian author Farley Mowat about the Atlantic Salvage Tug Foundation Franklin, operated by the firm Foundation Maritime in Canada's Maritime provinces from 1930 to 1948.

The book traces the history of the company and its discovery of a powerful salvage tug, the former Royal Navy tug HMS Frisky, was constructed by the John Lewis and Sons Shipbuilding at Aberdeen, Scotland. Decommissioned and in 1924 sold to a German company as the SS Gustavo Ipland, she was purchased and renamed by Foundation Maritime in 1930. The book follows the tug's various captains and crews in many daring rescues during the Great Depression and World War II based out of Halifax, Nova Scotia. The book finishes with Franklin's last voyage in January 1948 when she nearly sank while towing the Motor Ship Arosa through a hurricane. Suffering severe damage, the thirty-year-old Franklin limped home, arriving at Halifax on February 5, 1948. The tow of Arosa was completed by another Foundation salvage vessel, Foundation Josephine.

The Grey Seas Under is one of the few nonfiction books to detail the adventures of a salvage tug and its crews. It was inspired when Mowat heard tales about the legendary tug while his schooner moored beside a later Foundation Maritime tug during the 1950s. The book was first published in 1958 and is still in print (ISBN 1-58574-240-6). Mowat followed The Grey Seas Under with a book about Foundation Josephine entitled The Serpent's Coil.
