= Never Cry Wolf =

Fictional autobiography

- First edition
- Author: Farley Mowat
- Language: English
- Subject: Autobiography
- Publisher: McClelland and Stewart
- Publication date: 1963
- Publication place: Canada
- Media type: Print (hard & paperback)
- Pages: 256 pp
- ISBN: 0-316-88179-1
- OCLC: 48027680

Never Cry Wolf is a fictional account of author Farley Mowat's subjective experience observing wolves in subarctic Canada, first published in 1963 by McClelland and Stewart. It was adapted into a film of the same name in 1983. It has been credited for dramatically improving the public image of the wolf.

== Format ==
In the book, Mowat describes his experiences in a first-person narrative that sheds light on his research into the nature of the wolf in Keewatin Barren Lands, north of Churchill, Manitoba.

In 1948–1949, the Dominion Wildlife Service assigned the author to investigate the cause of declining caribou populations and determine whether wolves are to blame for the shortage. Upon finding his quarry near Nueltin Lake, Mowat discovers that rather than being wanton killers of caribou, the wolves subsist quite heavily on small mammals such as rodents and hares, "even choosing them over caribou when available."

== Points and claims ==
While the book is fictional, Mowat's book says that:

- The main reason for declining population of caribou is human hunters from civilization.
- Wolves that hunt a large herd animal would rather attack weaker, injured, or older animals, which helps rid the herd of members that slow its migration.
- Arctic wolves usually prey on muskox, caribou, smaller mammals, and rodents. One of these animals may include mice.
- A lone Arctic wolf has a better chance of killing small prey by running alongside it and attacking its neck. A group of wolves may successfully attack large prey from a number of positions.
- Arctic wolves typically travel and hunt in a group, working cooperatively to take down large animals effectively.
- Indigenous people can interpret wolves' howls. They can tell things such as whether a herd or a human is passing through the wolves' territory, the direction of travel, and more.

He concludes: "We have doomed the wolf not for what it is but for what we deliberately and mistakenly perceive it to be: the mythologized epitome of a savage, ruthless killer—which is, in reality, not more than the reflected image of ourselves. We have made it the scapewolf for our own sins." Mowat writes to expose the onslaught of wolfers and government exterminators who are out to erase the wolves from the Arctic.

== Reception ==
Barry Lopez in his 1978 work Of Wolves and Men called the book a dated, but still good, introduction to wolf behaviour.

In a 2001 article of The Canadian Historical Review entitled Never Cry Wolf: Science, Sentiment, and the Literary Rehabilitation of Canis Lupus, Karen Jones lauded the work as "an important chapter in the history of Canadian environmentalism";

The deluge of letters received by the Canadian Wildlife Service from concerned citizens opposing the killing of wolves testifies to the growing significance of literature as a protest medium. Modern Canadians roused to defend a species that their predecessors sought to eradicate. By the 1960s the wolf had made the transition from the beast of waste and desolation (in the words of Theodore Roosevelt) to a conservationist cause celebre....Never Cry Wolf played a key role in fostering that change.

— Karen Jones, "Never Cry Wolf: Science, Sentiment, and the Literary Rehabilitation of Canis Lupus", The Canadian Historical Review vol.84 (2001)

Mowat's book has received criticism relating to the veracity of his work and its conclusions. Canadian Wildlife Service official Alexander William Francis Banfield, who supervised Mowat's field work, characterised the book as "semi-fictional", and accused Mowat of blatantly lying about his expedition. He pointed out that contrary to what is written in the book, Mowat was part of an expedition of three biologists, and was never alone. Banfield also pointed out that a lot of what was written in Never Cry Wolf was not derived from Mowat's first hand observations, but were plagiarised from Banfield's own works, as well as from Adolph Murie's The Wolves of Mount McKinley. In a 1964 article published in the Canadian Field-Naturalist, he compared Mowat's 1963 bestseller to Little Red Riding Hood, claiming that, "I hope that readers of Never Cry Wolf will realize that both stories have about the same factual content." Mowat's humorous response to Banfield's review appeared in a subsequent letter to the editor of the same journal – ostensibly written by "Uncle Albert".

In the May 1996 issue of Saturday Night, John Goddard wrote a heavily researched article entitled A Real Whopper, in which he poked many holes in Mowat's claim that the book was non-fictional. He wrote:

"As for the authenticity of his wolf story, he virtually abandoned his wolf-den observations after less than four weeks."

— John Goddard, A Real Whopper from Saturday Night May 1996

Mowat excoriated Goddard's article as, "...bullshit, pure and simple... this guy's got as many facts wrong as there are flies on a toad that's roadkill." Journalist Val Ross of The Globe and Mail agreed that "Mowat, more passionate polemicist than rigorous reporter, painted federal bureaucrats in darker colours than many deserved," but that Goddard's piece erred in the same way against Mowat.

Although a claim that Mowat makes was that he interacted closely with a wolf pack alone in order to study them, the first wildlife biologist to successfully use the method of habituation to study and follow wild wolf packs in close proximity was fellow CWS scientist and International Wolf Specialist Group Canadian representative Dr. Lu Carbyn, in a 1970s study in Jasper National Park. Although also pointing out Never Cry Wolf's fictional rather than factual nature, his remarks were less critical, calling Farley Mowat's book "Good fiction and good reading".

In 2012, Mowat spoke to the Toronto Star about his reputation as a storyteller: "I took some pride in having it known that I never let facts get in the way of a good story. I was writing subjective non-fiction all along."

== Impact ==
Never Cry Wolf was a commercial success in Canada. Shortly after its publication, the Canadian Wildlife Service received a deluge of letters from concerned citizens opposing the killing of wolves. Though generally well received by the public, Mowat's allusions of the Canadian Wildlife Service as an organisation set out to exterminate wolves was met with anger from Canadian biologists. CWS staff members argued that the agency had never demanded the extermination of the wolf, the wolf being recognized as an integral part of the northern ecosystem. They further countered that Mowat's remit had not been to find justifications for wolf extermination, but to investigate the relationship between wolves and caribou. The locals were actually hunting the caribou, for a sport and a food source.

As with Mowat's other books, Never Cry Wolf was translated into Russian and published in the Soviet Union. The book's fictional message that wolves were harmless mouse-eaters became influential, leading to popular reaction against Soviet wolf-culling efforts.
