= John Mowat (college administrator) =

John Oliver Mowat (May 12, 1791 – February 4, 1860) was a Scottish-born soldier, merchant, politician and educator.

Known as Sargent John, the son of Oliver Mowat and Janet Bower, he was born in Mey and joined the British Army at the age of 16. He joined in the 3rd Regiment of Foot, served in the Peninsular War and came to Canada in 1814 to take part in the War of 1812. He remained in Canada when the 3rd Foot returned to England, first trying farming near Kingston and later becoming a merchant in Kingston selling dry goods and groceries. In 1819, Mowat married Helen Levack. He served as a director of the Commercial Bank of the Midland District, of the Kingston Building Society, of the Mutual Fire Insurance Company of the Midland District, of the Kingston Waterworks and of the Kingston Gas Light Company. Mowat was elected a councillor for the township in 1836 and also served as a justice of the peace and as a member of the local board of health. He became an alderman in 1846 but was defeated the following year when he ran for reelection. Mowat also served as an officer in the Kingston Field Battery.

In 1829, he was among those who were able to convince Reverend John Cruikshank to open a school in Kingston. Mowat was instrumental in founding Queen's College, later Queen's University, and served on its first board of trustees. He also helped oversee student housing for the college. His son John Bower Mowat was one of its first students.

He died in Kingston at the age of 68.

His son Sir Oliver Mowat later served as premier of Ontario. His son John Bower Mowat served on the faculty for Queen's. His great-great grandson is author Farley Mowat.
