= Farley Mowat =

Canadian writer and environmentalist (1921–2014)

Farley Mowat OC
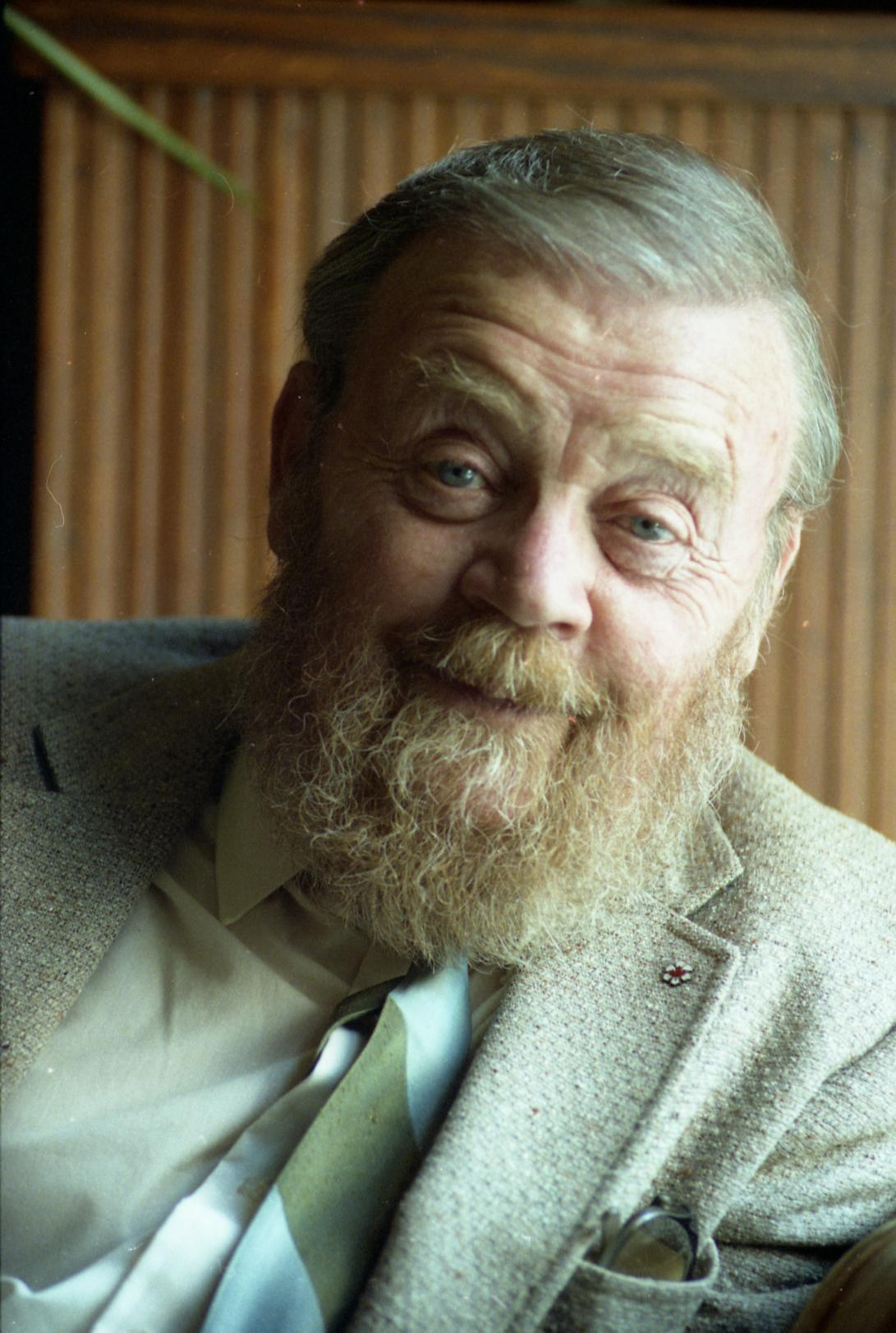
- Mowat in 1993
- Born: Farley McGill Mowat; May 12, 1921; Belleville, Ontario, Canada
- Died: May 6, 2014 (aged 92); Cobourg, Ontario, Canada
- Resting place: Port Hope, Ontario
- Education: Biology
- Alma mater: University of Toronto
- Occupations: Author, soldier, environmentalist, naturalist, philanthropist
- Spouse(s): Frances (Thornhill) Mowat 1947-1960 (div); Claire (Wheeler) Mowat (1969-2014)
- Children: Robert Mowat, David Mowat
- Relatives: John Mowat, John Bower Mowat, John McDonald Mowat, Angus McGill Mowat, Sir Oliver Mowat
- Writing career
- Language: English
- Period: 1952–2014
- Genres: Memoir, Young adult fiction, Non-fiction
- Subjects: Environmentalism, Northern Canada
- Notable works: Never Cry Wolf, People of the Deer, Lost in the Barrens, The Curse of the Viking Grave, The Grey Seas Under, Owls in the Family
- Website: farleymowat.ca

Farley McGill Mowat (May 12, 1921 – May 6, 2014) was a Canadian writer and environmentalist. His works were translated into 52 languages, and he sold more than 17 million books. He achieved fame with the publication of his books on the Canadian north, such as People of the Deer (1952) and Never Cry Wolf (1963). The latter, an account of his experiences with wolves in the Arctic, was made into a film of the same name released in 1983. For his body of work as a writer he won the annual Vicky Metcalf Award for Children's Literature in 1970.

Mowat's advocacy for environmental causes earned him praise, but his admission, after some of his books' claims had been debunked, that he "never let the facts get in the way of the truth" earned harsh criticism, while his supporters noted that the literary "exaggerations… [in] his books almost single-handedly drew attention to the plight of the Inuit and serious environmental issues, bringing about substantive changes of policy in Ottawa". Descriptions of Mowat refer to his "commitment to ideals" and "poetic descriptions and vivid images" as well as his strong antipathies, which led him to produce "ridicule, lampoons and, at times, evangelical condemnation".

== Early life and education ==
Mowat was born May 12, 1921, in Belleville, Ontario, and grew up in Richmond Hill, Ontario. His great-great-uncle was Ontario premier Sir Oliver Mowat, and his father, Angus Mowat, was a librarian. During World War I, Angus fought in the Battle of Vimy Ridge. His mother was Helen Lilian Thomson, daughter of Henry Andrew Hoffman Thomson and Georgina Phillips Farley Thomson of Trenton, Ontario. Mowat started writing, in his words "mostly verse", when his family lived in Windsor from 1930 to 1933.

In the 1930s, the Mowat family moved to Saskatoon, Saskatchewan, where as a teenager Mowat wrote about birds in a column for the Saskatoon Star-Phoenix. During this time, he also wrote his own nature newsletter, Nature Lore. In the 1930s, Mowat studied zoology at the University of Toronto but never completed a degree. He took his first collecting expedition in the summer of 1939 to Saskatoon with fellow zoology student Frank Banfield, who collected data regarding mammals while Mowat focused on birds. They sold their collections to the Royal Ontario Museum to finance their trip. Before the pair had enlisted for service in World War II, Banfield published his field notes in the Canadian Field-Naturalist, while Mowat published his when he returned from serving in Europe.

== War service ==
During World War II, Mowat joined the Canadian Army and was commissioned as a supernumerary second lieutenant into the Second Battalion, The Hastings and Prince Edward Regiment (affectionately known as the Hasty Ps) on 19 July 1940. He went overseas as a reinforcement officer for that regiment, joining the Canadian Army in the United Kingdom. On July 10, 1943, he was a subaltern in command of a rifle platoon and participated in the initial landings of Operation Husky, the Allied invasion of Sicily.

Mowat served throughout the campaign as a platoon commander and moved to Italy in September 1943, seeing further combat until December 1943. During the Moro River Campaign, part of the Italian Campaign, he suffered from battle stress, heightened after an incident on Christmas Day during the Battle of Ortona, the "Italian Stalingrad", when he was left weeping at the feet of an unconscious friend, Lieutenant Allan (Al) Park, who had an enemy bullet in his head. He then accepted a job as Intelligence Officer at battalion headquarters, later moving to Brigade Headquarters. He stayed in Italy with the 1st Canadian Infantry Division for most of the war and was eventually promoted to the rank of captain.

Mowat moved with the division to northwest Europe in early 1945. There, he worked as an intelligence agent in the Netherlands and went through enemy lines to start unofficial negotiations about food drops with General Blaskowitz. The food drops, during the final 10 days before the surrender of Nazi Germany, proceeded under the codenames Operations Manna (Commonwealth air forces) and Chowhound (American), saving thousands of Dutch lives.

Mowat also formed the 1st Canadian Army Museum Collection Team, according to his book My Father's Son, and arranged for the transport to Canada of several tons of German military equipment, including the piloted V1 rocket Fieseler Fi 103R Reichenberg and several armoured vehicles. Some of these vehicles are on display today at Canadian Forces Base Borden's tank museum, as well as the Canadian War Museum in Ottawa.

Mowat was discharged at the end of World War II with the rank of captain. He was considered for promotion to major. However, he declined the offer as it would have required his volunteering to stay in the Army until "no longer needed", which Mowat assumed meant duty with the Canadian Army Occupation Force (CAOF) (but might also have meant the conclusion of the war with Japan). He was entitled to the following medals as a result of his service: the 1939–1945 Star, the Italy Star, the France and Germany Star, the Defence Medal, the Canadian Volunteer Service Medal and the War Medal 1939–1945.

== Post-war ==
In 1947, Mowat was hired as field technician for American naturalist Francis Harper's study of the barren-ground caribou in the Nueltin Lake area—now Nunavut's Kivalliq Region, resulting in the publication of Harper's book entitled Caribou of Keewatin. Two young Inuit were with them, fifteen-year-old Inuk Luke Anoteelik (Luke Anowtalik) and his sister Rita, who were the sole survivors of starvation in an Inuit village. Luke Anowtalik went on to become well known for his distinctive carvings of antler and bone that are now in the permanent collection of the National Gallery of Canada. Due to a clash of personalities, Mowat undertook his own explorations. "Harper later extracted a promise that neither would mention the other in their respective future writing, a promise also extracted from Mowat by later field companions for their lifetimes."

In the late 1940s, Mowat was hired by Frank Banfield—then Chief Mammalogist of the newly formed Canadian Wildlife Service—as field assistant in Banfield's ambitious multi-year investigation of the barren-ground caribou, which resulted in Banfield's influential 1951 publication entitled "The Barren-ground Caribou". Mowat, who was part of a four-researcher team, was fired by the chief of Canadian Wildlife Service because of complaints from the local population and lack of formal approval for some activities.

== Literary career ==
After serving in World War II, Mowat attended the University of Toronto. Mowat's first book, People of the Deer (1952), was inspired by a field trip to the Canadian Arctic he made while studying at the University of Toronto. Mowat was outraged at the conditions endured by the Inuit living in Northern Canada. The book turned Mowat into a controversial, popular figure.

Mowat became a McClelland and Stewart author when they published his book entitled The Regiment in 1955. Jack McClelland, known for his promotion of Canadian authors, became his lifelong friend as well as his publisher. Mowat's next book, the children's book Lost in the Barrens (1956), won a Governor General's Award.

In 1963, Mowat wrote a possibly fictionalised account of his experiences in the Canadian Arctic with Arctic wolves entitled Never Cry Wolf (1963).

In 1985, Mowat started a book tour of the United States to promote Sea of Slaughter. He was denied entry by customs agents at Pearson International Airport in Toronto, which was justified by laws that allowed American customs officials to deny entry to entrants they thought were "Communist sympathizers". Believing gun lobbyists were behind his denial, he came forward with his suspicion. The law was overturned in 1990, and Mowat wrote about his experience in My Discovery of America (1985).

Mowat became very interested in Dian Fossey, the American ethologist who studied gorillas and was brutally murdered in Rwanda in 1985. His biography of her was published in 1987, in Canada under the title Virunga: The Passion of Dian Fossey, and in the United States as Woman in the Mists: The Story of Dian Fossey and the Mountain Gorillas of Africa—an allusion to Fossey's own recounting of her life and research Gorillas in the Mist (1983).

Many of Mowat's works are autobiographical, such as Owls in the Family (1962, about his childhood), The Boat Who Wouldn't Float (1969, one of three books about his time living in Newfoundland), and And No Birds Sang (1979, about his experience fighting in Italy in World War II).

In 1965, Westviking was published, followed 30 years later by The Farfarers, which suggests a people he called the Albans preceded the Norse to the High Arctic and the Labrador and Newfoundland coasts.

== Criticism ==
In a 1964 book review published in Canadian Field-Naturalist, Frank Banfield of the National Museum of Canada, a former Canadian Wildlife Service scientist, compared Mowat's 1963 bestseller to Little Red Riding Hood, stating, "I hope that readers of Never Cry Wolf will realize that both stories have about the same factual content." Mowat responded to Banfield's criticisms in a letter to the editor of the Canadian Field-Naturalist and signed it "Mowat's wolf Uncle Albert". L. David Mech, a wolf expert, is cited by Warner Shedd, a former regional executive of the National Wildlife Federation, as noting that no scientist, Mowat notwithstanding, has ever encountered a wolf population that primarily subsists on small prey, as claimed in Mowat's book. Mech additionally states, "...Mowat is not a scientist, and his book, although presented as truth, is fiction."

The New York Times Book Review published a dismissive review of People of the Deer on February 24, 1952. The Beaver was quite hostile in its first review. The second review, by A. E. Porsild, was equally hostile, questioning the existence of the Ihalmiut. Despite a few harsh reviews, however, People of the Deer was generally well received, published in the Atlantic Monthly and "showered with glowing international reviews".

Duncan Pryde, a Hudson's Bay Company trader who pioneered the linguistic study of Inuit languages, attacked Mowat's claim to have picked up the language quickly enough in two months to discuss detailed concepts such as shamanism, pointing out that the language is complex and required a year or more for Europeans to master the basics. Pryde said that when Mowat visited his post at Baker Lake in 1958, 10 years after Mowat's earlier trip, he could barely speak a single word in the Inuit language.

Canadian Geographic published excerpts from The Farfarers with the comment that it was "a highly speculative blend of history and archeology. In it, Mowat again draws upon Norse sagas, the chronicles of Irish monks, and accounts of Roman travellers, as well as the works of modern historians and archeologists. It is both detailed and, as with all early history, sketchy. The written record for much of the period covered is scant and the archeological record spotty. Still, such speculative writing can suggest avenues of exploration and study for future researchers. No professional archeologists are known to share Mowat's theories but that does not disturb him. A literary gadfly for much of his long career, Mowat is happy to stir up debate and challenge academics to match the visions that he champions and defends with such vigour and relish."

== Awards and honours ==
- 1950s: Mowat won two Canadian "year's best" book awards for Lost in the Barrens, (Little, Brown, 1956), an adventure novel set in Northern Manitoba and southwestern North West Territories—namely, the Governor General's Award for Juvenile Fiction for 1956 and the 1958 Canadian Library Association Book of the Year for Children Award. In 1952, Mowat won the University of Western Ontario's President's Medal for best short story for "Eskimo Spring". In 1953, People of the Deer was awarded the Anisfield-Wolf Book Award by the Anisfield–Wolf Foundation. In 1956, Mowat won the Governor General's Award. And in 1957, the Book of the Year Award, Canadian Association of Children's Librarians, for Lost in the Barrens. Also, in 1958, Mowat won the Canadian Women's Clubs Award for children's book The Dog Who Wouldn't Be and the Hans Christian Andersen International Award.
- 1960s: In 1962, he won the Boys' Clubs of America Junior Book Award for Owls in the Family. In 1963, he won the National Association of Independent Schools Award. In 1965, he made the Hans Christian Andersen Honours List, for juvenile books.
- 1970s: In 1970, The Boat Who Wouldn't Float won the Stephen Leacock Memorial Medal for Humour and in 1972, it made the L'Etoile de la Mer Honours List. Mowat also won the Vicky Metcalf Award, 1970; Mark Twain Award, 1971; and the Curran Award, 1977, for "contributions to understanding wolves".
- 1980s: He was given the Knight of Mark Twain distinction in 1980. In 1985, he received the Author's Award, Foundation for the Advancement of Canadian Letters for Sea of Slaughter. In 1988, Virunga was designated Book of the Year, Foundation for the Advancement of Canadian Letters, and Mowat was named Author of the Year by the Canadian Booksellers Association. In 1989, he won the Gemini Award for best documentary script, for The New North.
- 1990s: In 1991, the Council of Canadians presented him with the Back the Nation Award.
- 2000s: In 2002, the Sea Shepherd Conservation Society ship RV Farley Mowat (formerly M/Y Sea Shepherd III / M/Y Ocean Warrior) was named in his honour. Mowat frequently visited it to assist its mission and provided financial support to the group. In 2005, Mowat received the first and only Lifetime Achievement Award from the National Outdoor Book Award. On June 8, 2010, it was announced that Mowat would receive a star on Canada's Walk of Fame.
- 2010s: In 2014, only weeks after his death, a life-sized sculpture of Farley Mowat, commissioned by Toronto businessman Ron Rhodes and executed by the Canadian artist George Bartholomew Boileau, was unveiled at the University of Saskatchewan, located in Saskatoon, where Farley spent many of his formative years. His wife Claire was in attendance. Mowat had seen the finished clay, in the artist's studio, several months previously.

Mowat was made an Officer of the Order of Canada in 1981. He had previously been awarded both the Canadian Centennial Medal (1967) and the Queen Elizabeth II Silver Jubilee Medal (1977).

As an Order of Canada recipient, he automatically qualified for the 125th Anniversary of the Confederation of Canada Medal (1992), the Queen Elizabeth II Golden Jubilee Medal (2002), and the Queen Elizabeth II Diamond Jubilee Medal (2012).

(ribbon bar, as it would look at the date of his death, including war service medals)

Farley is also the namesake of the lovable sheepdog in the comic strip by Lynn Johnston, For Better or For Worse. Johnston and Mowat were long-time friends.

== Honorary doctorates ==
- 1970, D.Litt. – Doctor of Letters, Laurentian University
- 1973, LL.D. – Doctor of Laws, University of Lethbridge
- 1973, LL.D. – Doctor of Laws, University of Toronto
- 1979, LL.D. – Doctor of Laws, University of PEI
- 1982, D.Litt. – Doctor of Letters, University of Victoria
- 1985, D.Litt. – Doctor of Letters, Lakehead University
- 1994, D.Litt. – Doctor of Letters, McMaster University
- 1995, LL.D. – Doctor of Laws, Queen's University
- 1996, D.Litt. – Doctor of Letters, Cape Breton University

== Affiliations ==
Mowat was a strong supporter of the Green Party of Canada and a close friend of the party's leader Elizabeth May. The Green Party sent a direct mail fundraising appeal in Mowat's name in June 2007, and that same year Mowat became a patron of the Nova Scotia Nature Trust by donating over 200 acres (0.81 km^{2}) of his land in Cape Breton Island to the Nature Trust. He was also an honorary director of the North American Native Plant Society. Mowat was described as "a life-long socialist".

== Farley Mowat Library ==
In 2012, independent Canadian publisher Douglas & McIntyre announced they had created the Farley Mowat Library series and would be re-releasing many of his most popular titles, with new designs and introductions, in print and e-book format.

Mowat's archives are held at the William Ready Division of Archives and Research Collections at McMaster University, in Hamilton, Ontario.

== Later life ==
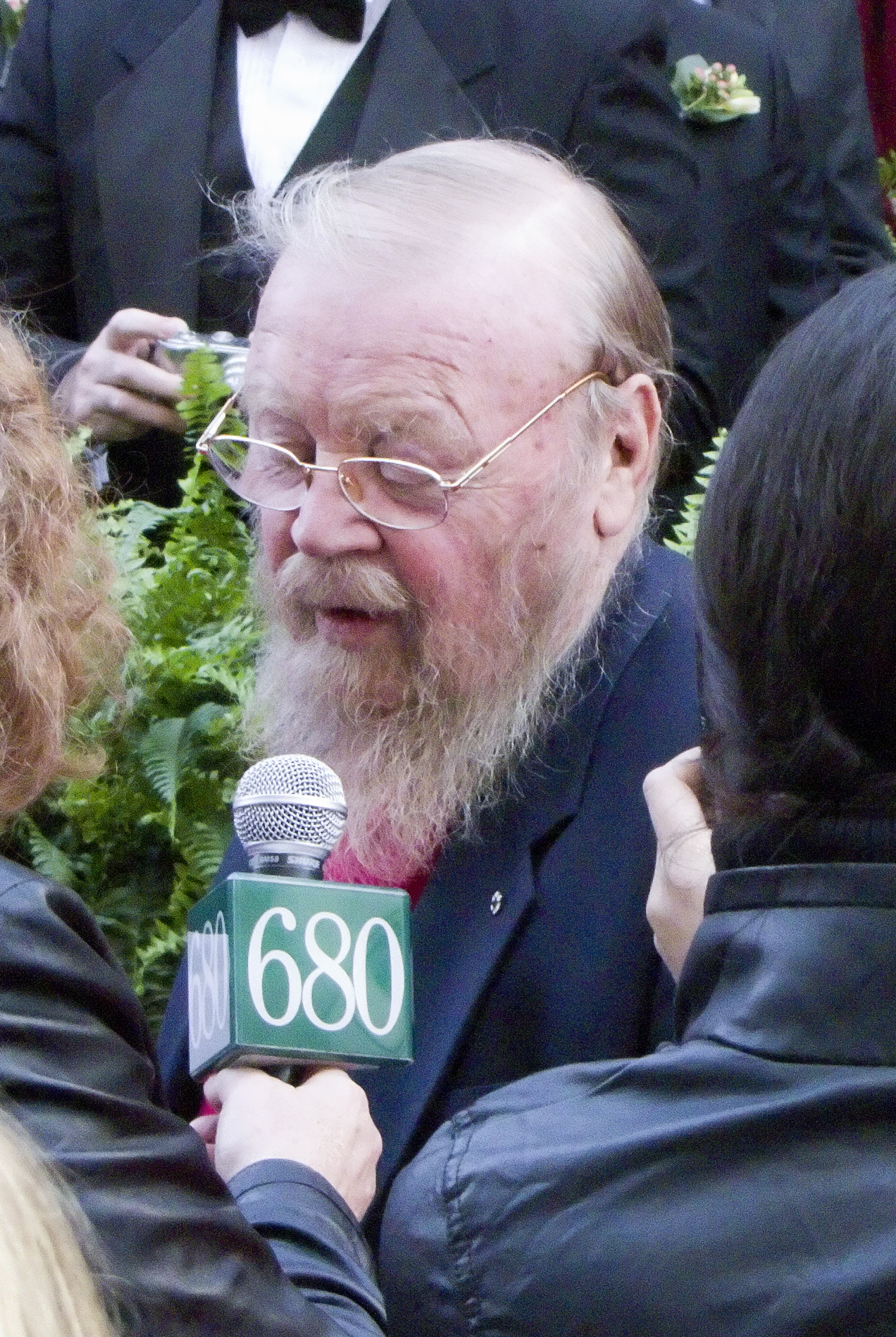
Mowat in 2010

Mowat and his second wife Claire spent their later years together in Port Hope, Ontario, and their summers on a farm on Cape Breton Island. They attended a local Anglican church in Port Hope about monthly, Claire emphasizing that Mowat was more spiritual than religious, and Mowat stating that he probably believed in God the same way his dog did, and that such ceremonies were important in tying people to each other and the world.

Mowat is considered a saint by the God's Gardeners, a fictional religious sect that is the focus of Margaret Atwood's 2009 novel The Year of the Flood.

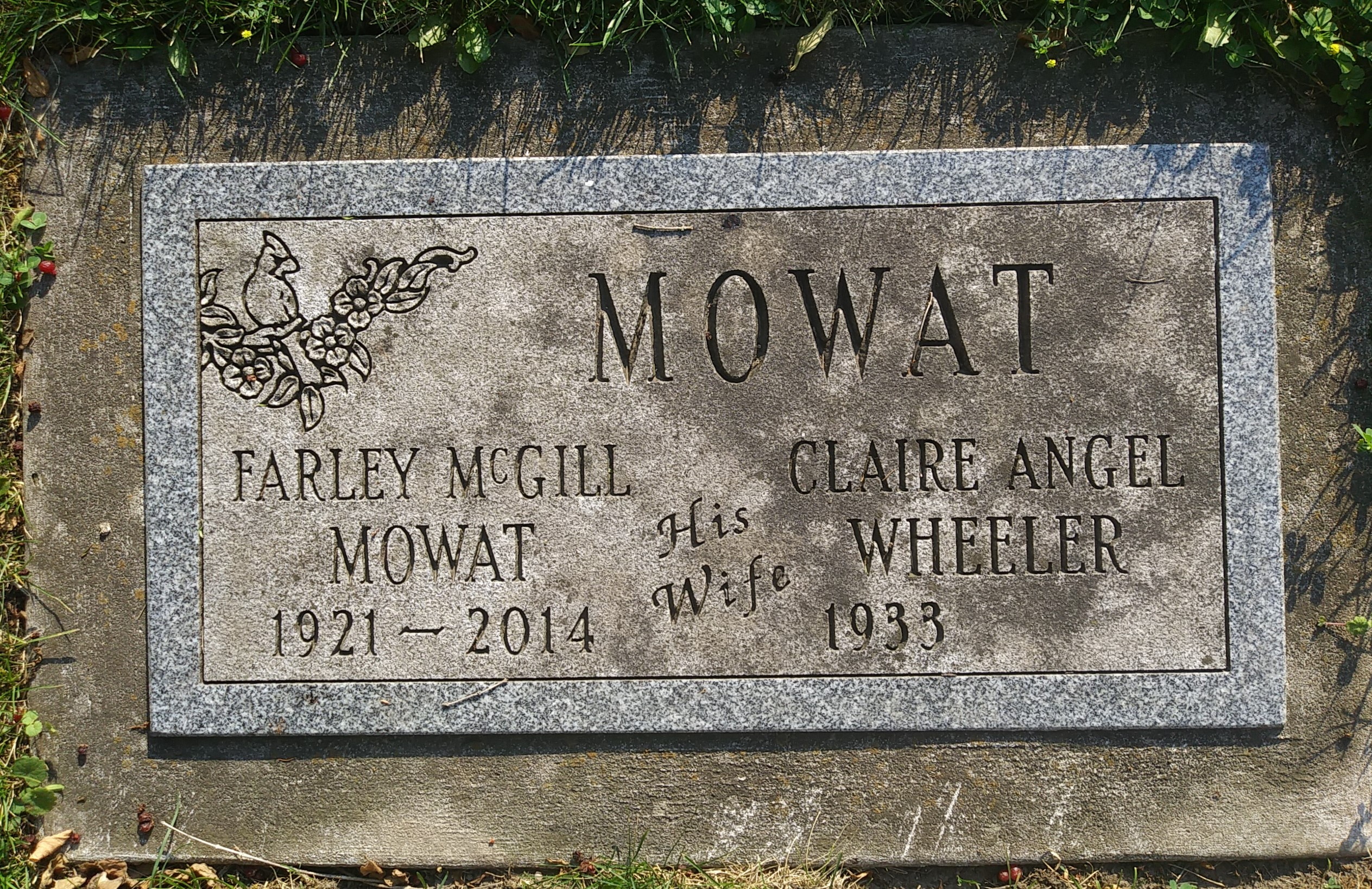
Mowat's gravesite

Mowat died on May 6, 2014, at age 92. He maintained his interest in Canada's wilderness areas throughout his life and could be heard a few days before his death on the CBC Radio One program The Current speaking against the provision of Wi-Fi service in national parks. He is buried at the historic St. Mark's Anglican Church cemetery in Port Hope.

== Works ==
- People of the Deer (1952; revised 1975) ISBN 0-89190-818-8
- The Regiment (book) (1955) ISBN 0-7710-6575-2
- Lost in the Barrens (1956) ISBN 0-553-27525-9
  - Lost in the Barrens (film) (1990) https://www.imdb.com/title/tt0100058/
- The Dog Who Wouldn't Be (1957) ISBN 0-553-27928-9
- Coppermine Journey (1958) ISBN 0-771-06690-2
- The Grey Seas Under (1959) ISBN 1-58574-240-6
- The Desperate People (1959; revised 1999) ISBN 1-471-32945-3
- Ordeal by Ice (1960) ISBN 0-7710-6686-4
- Owls in the Family (1961) ISBN 0-440-41361-3
- The Serpent's Coil (1961) ISBN 0-738-71577-8
- The Black Joke (1962) LCCN 63-13462
- Never Cry Wolf (1963) LCCN 63-19169
  - Never Cry Wolf (film) in 1983 ISBN 1-55890-281-3
- Westviking (1965) LCCN 65-20746
- The Curse of the Viking Grave (1966) ISBN 0-553-27525-9
  - The Curse of the Viking Grave (film) (1992) https://www.imdb.com/title/tt0102338/
- Canada North (illustrated edition) (1967) ISBN 978-0316586474
- The Polar Passion (1967) ISBN 978-0879053482
- This Rock Within the Sea (with John de Visser) (1968) LCCN 69-12137
- The Boat Who Wouldn't Float (1969) ISBN 0-553-27788-X
- Sibir (book) (1970) ISBN 978-0771065767
- A Whale for the Killing (1972, revised 2012) ISBN 978-1-77100-028-4
- Tundra (book) (1973) ISBN 0-7710-6627-9
- Wake of the Great Sealers (with David Blackwood) (1973) LCCN 73-14315
- The Snow Walker (book) (1976, revised 2014) ISBN 978-1771000857
  - The Snow Walker (movie) (2003) ISBN 1-59241-410-9
- Canada North Now (1976) ISBN 0-7710-6596-5
- And No Birds Sang (Farley Mowat) (1979, revised 2012) ISBN 978-1-77100-030-7
- The World of Farley Mowat (1980) ISBN 0-316-58689-7
- Sea of Slaughter (1984) ISBN 0-87113-013-0
- My Discovery of America (1985) ISBN 0-87113-050-5
- Virunga: The Passion of Dian Fossey (1987) ISBN 0-7710-6677-5
- The New Founde Land (1989) ISBN 0-7710-6689-9
- Rescue the Earth! (1990) ISBN 0-7710-6684-8
- My Father's Son (book) (1992) ISBN 1-55013-430-2
- Born Naked (1993) ISBN 0-395-73528-9
- Aftermath (1995) ISBN 1-57098-103-5
- The Farfarers (1998 – reprint 2000) ISBN 1-883642-56-6
- Walking on the Land (2000) ISBN 1-58642-024-0
- High Latitudes (2002) ISBN 1-58642-061-5
- No Man's River (2004) ISBN 0-7867-1430-1
- Bay of Spirits (2006) ISBN 0-7710-6538-8
- Otherwise (2008) ISBN 0-7710-6489-6
- Eastern Passage (2010) ISBN 978-0-7710-6491-3

The Top of the World Trilogy

- Ordeal by Ice (1960, revised 1973) ISBN 0-7710-6686-4
- The Polar Passion (1967, revised 1973) ISBN 978-0879053482
- Tundra (1973) ISBN 0-7710-6627-9
