= List of mayors of Kingston, Ontario =

This is a list of mayors of Kingston, Ontario.

In Office	Mayor	Born/Died	Notes
1838	Thomas Kirkpatrick	(1805–1870)	First mayor after Kingston becomes Town. First member of parliament for Frontenac.
1839	Henry Cassaday	(1797–1839)	Died in office.
1839–1840	James Sampson	(1789–1861)	
1841–1843	John Counter	(1799–1862)	
1844	James Sampson	(1789–1861)	
1844–1845	Thomas Weeks Robison	(1810–1866)	
1846	Robert McLean	(1806-?)	Disappeared after being ousted from office due to amalgamation.
1846	John Counter	(1799–1862)	First mayor after incorporation as city.
1847	Thomas Kirkpatrick	(1805–1870)	
1848	William Ford Jr.	(1811–1893)	
1849	Francis Manning Hill	(1809–1854)	
1850	John Counter	(1799–1862)	
1851	Francis Manning Hill	(1809–1854)	
1852–53	John Counter	(1799–1862)	
1854	John Flanigan	(1815–1888)	
1855	John Counter	(1799–1862)	
1855–1856	Overton Smith Gildersleeve	(1825–1864)	
1857	George Davidson	(1810–1887)	
1858	John Flanigan	(1799–1862)	
1859–1860	Orlando Sampson Strange	(1826–1906)	
1861–62	Overton Smith Gildersleeve	(1825–1864)	
1863–1865	John Creighton	(1817–1885)	Elected by acclamation 1864, 1865
1866–1868	John Breden	(1801–1893)	
1869–1870	William Robinson	(1824–1912)	
1871	Archibald Livingston	(1827–1890)	
1872	Samuel Trangott Drennan	(1819–1882)	
1873	Henry Cunningham	(1831–1904)	
1874–1875	Michael Sullivan	(1838–1915)	
1876	Byron M. Britton	(1833–1920)	
1877	John McKelvey	(1837–1927)	
1878	John McIntyre	(1843–1916)	
1879	Charles Fuller Gildersleeve	(1833–1906)	Also first president of the Kingston and Pembroke Railway c1871-c1900.
1880	Robert John Carson	(1846–1935)	
1881	Edward John Barker Pense	(1848–1910)	Also the owner of the newspaper, the Daily British Whig.
1882	John Gaskin	(1840–1908)	
1883	Charles Livingston Sr.	(1825–1888)	
1884	Dr. James McCammon	(1833–1884)	
1885	Edward Handley Smythe	(1844–1903)	
1886	John Lanyon Whiting	(1852–1922)	
1887	John Carson	(1858–1912)	
1888–1889	James Duncan Thompson	(1848–1910)	
1890–1891	William Melville Drennan	(1853–1900)	
1892	Donald M. McIntyre	(1855–1931)	
1893	Neil Currie Polson	(1852–1940)	
1894	Dr. John Herald	(?-1905)	
1895	Clark William Wright	(1859–1916)	
1896	Robert Elliott	(1861-?)	
1897	John S. Skinner	(?-1897)	
1898	Charles Livingston Jr.	(1857–1931)	Son of Charles Livingston Sr.
1899	Dr. Edward Ryan	(1860–1938)	
1900	James Arnott Minnes	(1868–1927)	
1901	Robert Edwin Kent	(1861-?)	
1902	John Morgan Shaw	(?-1925)	
1903–1904	Dr. John Howatt Bell	(1867–1940)	
1905	Robert Newton Frederick McFarlane	(?-1934)	
1906–1907	John McDonald Mowat	(1873–1916)	Died overseas during World War I.
1908	Dr. Arthur Edward Ross	(1870–1952)	Represented Kingston as MLA and MP.
1909–1910	Daniel Couper	(1863–1925)	
1911	Christopher L. Graham		
1912	Franklin John Hoag	(1868–1957)	
1913	Timothy John Rigney	(1872–1967)	
1914	Robert Dundas Sutherland	(1874–1935)	
1915	Abraham Shaw	(1848–1922)	
1916	Dr. Alexander White Richardson	(18??-1938)	
1917–1918	John McKane Hughes	(?-1932)	
1919	Henry Wallace Newman	(1875–1926)	
1920–1921	Hugh Collamer Nickle	(1874–1946)	
1922	Samuel S. Corbet	(1870–1959)	
1923–1926	Thomas Bryant Angrove	(1869–1903)	
1927	Havelock Ford Price	(1862–1930)	
1928–1930	William H. Craig	(1880–1930)	
1931–1932	George Clark Wright	(1885–1956)	Son of Clark William Wright
1933	Dr. Bruce Hopkins	(1886–1971)	
1934	William P. Peters		
1935	John Clifford Reynolds	(1897-?)	
1936	George Hanson	(1862–1938)	
1937	Charles P. Dalton		
1938–1943	Dr. Harry A. Stewart	(1892–1970)	
1944–1945	Cecil Leroy Boyd	(1889–1954)	
1946–1948	Major James Stuart Crawford	(1894–1948)	In a meeting held September 10, 1943, Kingston's mayor, Major J. Stuart Crawford, was unanimously elected first president of the newly established Hockey Hall of Fame.
1948–1952	Clifford Austin Curtis	(1899–1981)	
1953–1956	George Clark Wright	(1885–1956)	Died while completing last term in office.
1956	Russell E. McCullough	(1906–2000)	
1957–1958	Frank P. Boyce	(1890–1985)	
1959–1964	William Thomas Mills	(1924–2011)	
1965–1968	Robert A. Fray	(1909–1993)	
1969–1972	Ernest Valorie Swain		
1973–1976	George Nicholas Speal	(1932–2008)	
1977–1979	Ken Keyes	(b.1930)	Represented Kingston as MPP.
1980–1988	John Gerretsen	(b.1942)	Represented Kingston as MPP.
1988–1993	Helen Cooper	(b.1946)	Progressive Conservative candidate for the House of Commons in 1997. Chair of the Ontario Municipal Board from 1993 to 1996
1993–1994	Ken Matthews	(b.1928)	
1994–2000	Gary Bennett	(b.date unknown)	Ontario Progressive Conservative Party candidate in Kingston and the Islands for the 2018 and 2022 provincial elections
2000–2003	Isabel Turner	(1936–2021)	Reeve of Kingston Township for 12 years until it was amalgamated into the City of Kingston in 2000
2003–2010	Harvey Rosen	(1949–2022)	After he was mayor, unsuccessfully sought federal and provincial Liberal nominations.
2010–2014	Mark Gerretsen	(b.1975)	Son of former mayor John Gerretsen, Represented Kingston as MP
2014-2026	Bryan Paterson	(b.1977)	During his last term, won the federal Conservative nomination, lost the 2025 general election against his mayoral predecessor Liberal Mark Gerretsen.
2026–	Conny Glenn		
