= Policy Governance =

System for organizational governance

Policy Governance, informally known as the Carver model, is a system for organizational governance. Policy Governance defines and guides appropriate relationships between an organization's owners (also with non-legal 'moral owners'), board of directors, and chief executive. The system is built on 10 principles, three of which are especially distinctive for the system. Firstly the clear distinction between policies that describe Ends (long term outcomes for the organization) and that describe Means (all other aspects of governing and operations), secondly the importance of executive limitations to control risk, and thirdly the board’s obligation to engage with its “moral owners” (the specific groups of stakeholders to whom the board wants to be accountable to, apart from the formal owners).

The Policy Governance approach was first developed in the 1970s by John Carver who has registered the term as a service mark in order to control accurate description of the model. The model is available for all to use without royalties or license fees and has been adopted by commercial, nonprofit, and public sector organizations.

== Principles of Policy Governance ==
John Carver described Policy Governance as an integrated system of governance principles intended to enable boards to govern organizations with clarity of authority, accountability, and delegation. Across Carver’s writings, the principles were expressed with generally consistent intent, although wording and presentation varied somewhat over time. A later articulation of the principles appeared in Policy Governance® in a Nutshell (2009), included in the revised Carver Policy Governance Guide series.

The ten principles identified in that articulation are:

1. Ownership
2. Position of the board
3. Board holism
4. Ends policies
5. Board means policies
6. Executive limitations policies
7. Policy sizes
8. Clarity and coherence of delegation
9. Any reasonable interpretation
10. Monitoring

In the Policy Governance model, boards are responsible for defining organizational Ends — the intended organizational impacts, for whom those impacts exist, and their relative worth or priority — while delegating operational means to executive leadership within defined limitations.

The model emphasizes that the principles operate as an integrated system rather than as independent governance practices. Carver argued that applying only selected principles weakens the coherence and effectiveness of the model as a whole.

== Claims for the model ==
Authors of the Policy Governance model say it is a paradigm shift from the traditional practice of governance and that it provides a clear differentiation between governance and management responsibilities in organizations.

According to the Policy Governance principles, it is the board’s responsibility to act as a trustee on behalf of the organization’s owners by setting clear expectations for the outcomes of the organization (Ends), setting clear operational boundaries for the CEO (Executive Limitations) and ensuring accountability by monitoring the actions of the CEO against those boundaries systematically and rigorously. From this definition, board governance enables the board to maintain accountability for everything without the need to be involved in daily operations and details. Said another way, the board’s arms are wrapped around the entire organization, but their fingers are not in the day-to-day details.

The board's primary relationship is with the organization's 'ownership'. As a result, governance is a downward extension of ownership rather than an upward extension of management. In this space, the board, as a single entity, assumes a governance position that is the link between ownership and the operational organization. That governance position is a commanding authority. The board exists to exercise that commanding authority and to properly empower others. "Proper empowerment" means to define the results to be achieved by the organization (Ends), and define what would be considered unacceptable in terms of ethics and prudence (Executive Limitations). The board delegates the job of achieving its Ends within the parameters defined in policy to the CEO. To complete the delegation, the board rigorously monitors performance to policy to uphold accountability of the CEO.

In Policy Governance, the board has three primary jobs: Ownership Linkage - connecting with owners to learn their values about ends that are desired and means that would be unacceptable; Policy Development - writing those values as guidance for organization and for the board itself; and Assurance of Organizational Performance - monitoring to ensure the organization demonstrates reasonable progress toward desired ends and reasonable compliance with policy guiding means. The board's focus is at the broadest level of policy informed by the ownership's values. When writing policy, the board goes into as much detail as needed, and stops making policy when it can accept any reasonable interpretation of its policy language.

Experts in the model argue boards should govern with an emphasis on (a) outward vision rather than an internal preoccupation, (b) encouragement of diversity in viewpoints, (c) strategic leadership more than administrative detail, (d) clear distinction of board and chief executive roles, (e) collective rather than individual decisions, (f) future rather than past or present, and (g) proactivity rather than reactivity.

Templates of policies are provided in the literature and by those trained in the model in order to illustrate what model-consistent policies might look like. However these templates are not themselves the model and their use does not substitute for a board developing its own policies using the model's principles. Each policy that a board adopts should be an organizational value statement that reflects the shared values of that organization's ownership.

Many people confuse modification of policy language so that it fits their organization with changing the model itself. Model-consistent practice is assessed by considering whether board performance aligns with the model's principles, not by reviewing the policy language that is adopted.

== Criticism of the model ==
Industry Canada in the Primer For Directors of Not-For-Profit Corporations expressed concern about Policy Governance. They argue that “Some models of board governance—notably originating in the United States—advocate that directors limit themselves to policy matters only and leave responsibility for administration and day-to-day matters with the executive staff of the corporation. This limited role for directors does not reflect the obligations that are legally imposed upon directors.”

Hugh Kelly QC of the Canadian legal firm Miller Thomson LLP responded directly to this criticism concluding that: “The board of a Canadian charitable corporation that adopts Policy Governance has performed 'due diligence', and fulfilled all legal obligations imposed upon its directors. On a comparative basis, such boards and directors are far ahead of most corporations, even those in the world of commerce, in observing their legal and moral obligations.”

Others have expressed concern that the Policy Governance model may not be as universally applicable as suggested by Carver and that the model has a tendency to break down during times of crisis. Addressing the universality concern, proponents of Policy Governance argue that, because the model is rooted in the generic purpose and nature of board authority rather than current practice of the specifics of any industry, at the level of its fundamental principles Policy Governance is indeed applicable to all governing boards. Proponents also argue that at times of crisis, holding onto the precepts of Policy Governance is in fact key to organizational survival and that rehearsing the use of the system in light of various scenarios can help build an organization's resilience to risk.

Two more widely accepted criticisms are that the model demands a level of precision that boards can find hard to achieve—even though it is usually no more than they demand of their staff—and without care, that the model's use can deteriorate over time and its protections fail to function. Many proponents point to the challenges presented by board member turnover and the need, as with any other professional discipline, for boards to continuously invest in their own training and support.

Some authors and users of the model may misinterpret the distinction between 'ends' and 'means' to require a strict separation of responsibility between the board, which should focus exclusively on 'ends', and management, which should focus on the 'means' by which to achieve those ends. This interpretation is not supported by a close reading of the Policy Governance model. Carver states: "because the board is accountable for everything, it is accountable for means as well. Accordingly, it must exercise control over both ends and means, so having the ends/means distinction does not in itself relieve boards from any responsibility".

Another, related, misinterpretation is a belief that boards following Carver's model should not involve themselves with detailed understanding and/or monitoring of the organization's activities. This belief is based on Carver's caution against excessive intrusion into the operational details. However, Carver is clear that boards remain accountable to their owners for all operational details and must therefore control them—the question is how to make this practical. As a way to avoid excessive intrusion, he advises the use of 'nested sets' of expectations, in progressively more narrow policy language, in order to define its meaning with greater precision until: "At some point, the board will have narrowed its words to the point that it can accept any reasonable interpretation of those words. Now the board has reached the point of delegation".

Because a board has ultimate power over the organization, to include all its operations, some critics point out that a board should not delegate any of its authority, because it ignores major areas of its responsibility if it "hands over" part of its power to the CEO. This criticism points out that delegation, the granting of authority to the CEO, can become an "abdication" of the board's responsibility to control all organizational actions. Delegation can become an abdication if it occurs without adequate supervision. Delegation accompanied by careful monitoring to ensure it achieves the results intended is an exercise of the "due diligence" expected of the board.

Further criticism relates to the failure of some boards to follow their own policies. Following policies that guide the board in its own governance process, and its relationship with the CEO, is an act of self-discipline by which the board imposes checks and balances on its own power. These self-limiting policies protect staff from board actions that might get in the way of successful organizational performance. They also protect the CEO, and the board itself, from possible actions of individual board members. A board may give a false sense that it is acting in the best interests of the organization while ignoring its own policies, and therefore promotes a "veil" of legitimacy behind which it acts in capricious ways. Such a board distracts itself from the real job boards should be doing. Ultimately, whether a board remains true to its own policies is a matter for the board itself to determine. Carver notes this concern when he acknowledges that Policy Governance will not make "a bad board good."

== See also ==
- Chief governance officer
- Chief governing officer

Some organizations mentioning use of Policy Governance or the Carver Model:

- The 519 Church Street Community Centre
- First Unitarian Church of Rochester
- International Community School of Addis Ababa
- Kingston Frontenac Public Library
- Masters Swimming Canada
- Pacific Unitarian Church
- People's Food Co-op (Portland)
- Wilfrid Laurier University Students' Union
- Crandall University
