= CGO =

CGO may refer to:

- Carlson, Gaskey & Olds: an intellectual property firm based in Birmingham, Michigan
- Catalogue of Galactic O Stars, an astronomical catalogue
- Central Gilts Office
- Ceria gadolinium oxide (used in Solid Oxide Fuel cells (SOFC))
- CGO Ecology Limited, a UK-based ecological consultancy business
- Cgo, a subsystem in the Go programming language which enables the creation of Go packages that call C code
- Chief governance officer
- Chief governing officer
- Company-grade officer
- Chief growth officer
- Royal Concertgebouw Orchestra, a symphony orchestra of the Netherlands
- Zhengzhou Xinzheng International Airport (IATA: CGO)
- Cambridge Graduate Orchestra at Cambridge, UK
- International Symposium on Code Generation and Optimization
- Republic of the Congo (FIFA and IOC code: CGO)
