= Kingston Frontenac Public Library =

- Location: 130 Johnson Street; Kingston, Ontario; K7L 1X8
- Type: Public Library system in Kingston Frontenac
- Established: 1895
- Branches: 16

Collection
- Items collected: business directories, phone books, maps, government publications, books, periodicals, genealogy, local history,

Other information
- Website: Kingston Frontenac Public Library

The Kingston Frontenac Public Library (KFPL) was established in 1998 through the amalgamation of the Kingston Public Library (which began as a 19th-century Mechanics Institute) and the Frontenac County Library, creating a 17-branch system. The KFPL serves the city of Kingston and Frontenac County in Ontario, Canada. The library regularly welcomes visitors from outside of this region. The KFPL has a board made up of appointees and representatives from Kingston City Council and Frontenac County Council. The board operates using the Carver Model.

== Services ==
- Information and reference services
- Community information
- Internet access
- Reader's advisory services
- Programs for children, youth and adults
- Delivery to homebound individuals
- Interlibrary loan
- Free downloadable audiobooks and e-books

== History ==
It was one of a series of Mechanics' Institutes that were set up around the world after becoming popular in Britain. It housed a subscription library that allowed members who paid a fee to borrow books. The Mechanics' Institutes libraries eventually became public libraries when the establishment of free libraries occurred. The Mechanics Institute in Kingston was founded in 1834; in 1895, the Kingston Public Library was established, making it one of the first public libraries in Canada.

== Branches ==
There are five branches within the city of Kingston and eleven branches throughout Frontenac County. The library branches include:

- Arden
- Calvin Park
- Cataraqui Centre (temporary)
- Central (main branch)
- Cloyne
- Hartington
- Howe Island
- Isabel Turner (closed for renovations, re-opening Spring 2026)
- Mountain Grove
- Parham
- Pittsburgh
- Plevna
- Rideau Heights
- Sharbot Lake
- Storrington
- Sydenham
- Wolfe Island

The KFPL also offers two mobile library locations. A mobile library offers a selection of books that can be borrowed with a KFPL membership. The two locations include:

- Kingston Secondary School
- Kingston East Community Centre

== See also ==
- Ontario Public Libraries
