= 2022 Kingston, Ontario municipal election =

2022 Kingston municipal election
- October 24, 2022
- Turnout: 31.12%
Nominee	Bryan Paterson	Skyler McArthur-Oblenes
Popular vote	21,844	3,545
Percentage	74.29%	12.06
Nominee	Ivan Stoiljkovic	Tina Fraser
Popular vote	2,147	1,866
Percentage	7.30%	6.35%
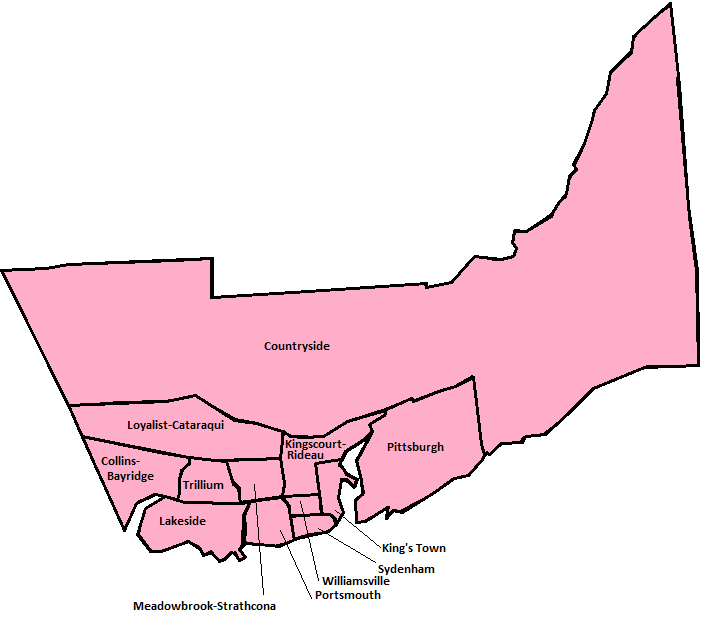
- Map of Kingston's 12 districts
Mayor before election
Bryan Paterson
Elected mayor
Bryan Paterson

The 2022 Kingston, Ontario municipal election was held on October 24, 2022, to elect the Mayor of Kingston, Kingston City Council and the Limestone District School Board, Algonquin and Lakeshore Catholic District School Board, Conseil des écoles publiques de l'Est de l'Ontario and Conseil des écoles catholiques du Centre-Est. The election was held on the same day as elections in every other municipality in Ontario.

The candidates registered to run for Kingston City Council and School Board Trustees are as follows:

== Mayor ==
Mayoral Candidate	Vote	%
Bryan Paterson (X)	21,844	74.29
Skyler McArthur-O'Blenes	3,545	12.06
Ivan Stoiljkovic	2,147	7.30
Tina Fraser	1,866	6.35

== City Council ==
=== Countryside District #1 ===
Council Candidate	Vote	%
Gary Oosterhof (X)	Acclaimed	

=== Loyalist-Cataraqui District #2 ===
Council Candidate	Vote	%
Paul Chaves	1,709	50.52
Jacqui Collier	1,674	49.48

=== Collins-Bayridge District #3 ===
Council Candidate	Vote	%
Lisa Osanic (X)	2,236	75.21
Joel Thompson	737	24.79

=== Lakeside District #4 ===
Council Candidate	Vote	%
Wendy Stephen	1,697	51.50
Wayne Hill (X)	1,598	48.50

=== Portsmouth District #5 ===
Council Candidate	Vote	%
Don Amos	776	32.44
Oren Nimelman	578	24.16
Colleen Murphy	503	21.03
Nicole Florent	232	9.70
Zachary Typhair	164	6.86
Ashley Perna	108	4.52
Sebastian Vaillancourt	31	1.30

=== Trillium District #6 ===
Council Candidate	Vote	%
Jimmy Hassan	1,874	62.95
Rob Matheson	999	33.56
Hanny Philip	104	3.49

=== Kingscourt-Rideau District #7 ===
Council Candidate	Vote	%
Brandon Tozzo	800	41.58
Tom Gingrich	425	22.09
Darryl McIntosh	270	14.03
Michael Judd	255	13.25
Joseph Dowser	113	5.87
Keaton Zandbergen	61	3.17

=== Meadowbrook-Strathcona District #8 ===
Council Candidate	Vote	%
Jeff McLaren (X)	1,518	56.04
Michael Murphy	1,098	40.53
Jacob Wynperle	93	3.43

=== Williamsville District #9 ===
Council Candidate	Vote	%
Vincent Cinanni	675	44.67
Annette Burfoot	579	38.32
Ian Clark	218	14.43
Selina Chiarelli	29	1.92
Rob Fonger	10	0.66

=== Sydenham District #10 ===
Council Candidate	Vote	%
Conny Glenn	504	35.10
Peter Stroud (X)	447	31.13
Rami Maassarani	288	20.06
Paul Joseph Charbonneau	197	13.72

=== King's Town District #11 ===
Council Candidate	Vote	%
Gregory Ridge	1,245	63.94
Keith Bilow	352	18.08
Alexandria Liu	350	17.98

=== Pittsburgh District #12 ===
Council Candidate	Vote	%
Ryan Boehme (X)	2,389	74.98
Lindsay Duggan	797	25.02

== English Language Public School Board Trustees ==
=== Countryside, Kingscourt-Rideau & Williamsville ===
Candidate Name	Vote	%
Jim Neill	1787	44.42%
Joyce MacLeod-Kane	1234	30.67%
Paula Murray	1002	24.91%

=== King's Town, Pittsburgh & Frontenac Islands ===
Candidate Name	Vote	%
Bob Godkin (X)	2091	61.05%
John Wernham	1334	38.95%

=== Lakeside & Trillium ===
Candidate Name	Vote	%
Garrett Elliott	2257	50.23%
Elizabeth Ann Coveney	1637	36.43%
Nida Qureshi	599	13.33%

=== Loyalist-Cataraqui, Collins-Bayridge & Meadowbrook-Strathcona ===
Candidate Name	Vote	%
Judith Brown (X)	2777	44.74%
Chris Scott	1774	28.58%
Crystal Bevens-Leblanc	1656	26.68%

=== Portsmouth & Sydenham ===
Candidate Name	Vote	%
Joy Morning (X)	Acclaimed	

== English Language Separate School Board Trustees ==
=== Algonquin & Lakeshore Catholic District School Board ===
Candidate Name	Vote	%
Terry Shea	2126	18.58%
Kathy Turkington	2050	17.91%
Shawn Murphy	1943	16.98%
Brian Evoy	1715	14.99%
Daniel Da Silva	1360	11.88%
Nicole Skladowski	1297	11.33%
Paul Brioux	953	8.33%

== French Language Public School Board Trustee ==
=== Le Conseil des écoles publiques de l'Est de l'Ontario - Geographic Region 2 ===
Candidate Name	Vote	%
Rachel Laforest	Acclaimed	

== French Language Separate School Board Trustee ==
=== Le Conseil des écoles catholiques du Centre-Est ===
Candidate Name	Vote	%
Michel Charron	Acclaimed	
