= Archibald Livingstone (disambiguation) =

Archibald Livingstone may refer to:

- Archibald Livingstone (1827-1910), Canadian politician
- Archie Livingstone (1872-?) Scottish footballer
- Archie Livingstone (footballer, born 1915) (1915-1961), Scottish footballer
