= William Thomas Mills =

Canadian politician (1924–2011)

His Worship Bill Mills
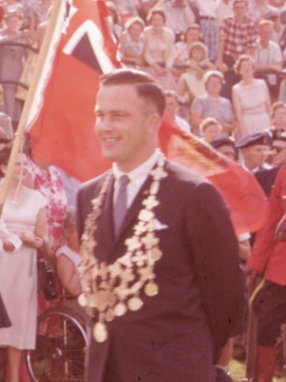
- Mills in 1959

Mayor of Kingston
- In office 1959–1964
- Preceded by: Frank P. Boyce
- Succeeded by: Robert A. Fray

Personal details
- Born: William Thomas Mills; 1924
- Education: Queen's University
- Profession: Politician

William Thomas "Bill" Mills (1924 – October 9, 2011) was a business owner and politician in Ontario, Canada. He served as mayor of Kingston from 1959 to 1964.

The son of William and Beatrice Mills, he was educated at Queen's University. Mills operated an office supplies business. He served in the Royal Canadian Air Force during World War II. He was married to Thelma Byron around 1948.

Mills ran for mayor again in 1967, losing to incumbent George Speal. He was an unsuccessful candidate for the Kingston seat in the Ontario assembly, losing to Syl Apps.

In 2010, he suffered an attack of pneumonia followed by two heart attacks in hospital. Mills died at home in Kingston the following year.
