= John Carver =

John Carver may refer to:

- John Carver (Plymouth Colony governor) (bef. 1576–1621), passenger on the Pilgrim ship Mayflower
- John Carver (board policy), author of a policy model for boards of directors
- John Carver (footballer) (born 1965), English football manager
- John Henry Carver (1926–2004), Australian physicist
- John Carver (Archdeacon of Surrey) (1741–1814),
- John A. Carver Jr. (born 1968), American attorney and politician
- John Carver, fictional serial killer from Eli Roth's 2023 film Thanksgiving

== See also ==
- John Carver Meadows Frost (1915–1979), British aircraft designer
- Jonathan Carver (1710–1780), American explorer
- Jack Carver, video game character
