= Erin Polansky =

Canadian rabbi

Rabbi Erin Polansky

Personal life
- Born: 1974 Montreal, Quebec, Canada
- Spouse: Adam Shapiro
- Education: Queen's University (1995); Hebrew Union College – Jewish Institute of Religion

Religious life
- Religion: Judaism
- Denomination: Conservative Judaism (formerly Reform Judaism)

Jewish leader
- Previous post: Senior rabbi, Kehillat Beth Israel, Ottawa (appointed 2024); Founding rabbi, Neshamah Congregation, Vaughan (2011–2018)
- Position: Rabbi
- Synagogue: Beth Israel Congregation, Kingston, Ontario
- Semikhah: Hebrew Union College – Jewish Institute of Religion, 2000

Erin Polansky (born 1974) is a Canadian rabbi. Ordained in the Reform movement in 2000, she founded Neshamah Congregation, a Reform congregation for young families in Vaughan, Ontario, in 2011. In 2018 she became rabbi of Beth Israel Congregation, a Conservative synagogue in Kingston, Ontario, and was later admitted to the Conservative movement's Rabbinical Assembly. She was appointed senior rabbi of Kehillat Beth Israel in Ottawa in 2024 and later returned to Beth Israel in Kingston.

== Early life and education ==
Polansky was born in Montreal and grew up in Thornhill, Ontario. She attended Queen's University, graduating in 1995. In her second year she was co-president of Queen's Hillel, the Jewish students' association. According to her congregation's biography, she was the first recipient of the university's minor in Jewish studies.

She trained for the rabbinate at the Hebrew Union College – Jewish Institute of Religion in Jerusalem and Cincinnati, and was ordained in 2000. She later continued her studies at Yeshiva University, through the Rabbinical Assembly and the Jewish Theological Seminary, and at the graduate school of Queen's University.

== Rabbinate ==
=== Minnesota and Toronto ===
After her ordination, Polansky served as assistant rabbi and rabbi-educator at Bet Shalom Congregation in the Minneapolis area. In 2004 she returned to Toronto as associate rabbi of Temple Sinai.

=== Neshamah Congregation ===
In 2011 Polansky founded Neshamah, a Reform congregation in the Thornhill Woods area of Vaughan that billed itself as "a new model for Jewish community". It was designed for the young families of the northern part of York Region who did not want the cost of a synagogue with its own building and high dues. Neshamah held Shabbat services monthly at the North Thornhill Community Centre and in members' homes, and ran its Sunday school at the northern campus of TanenbaumCHAT. By 2017 it had about 150 member families. Polansky told The Canadian Jewish News that for her generation, "building synagogues and paying for institutions is not in the works", and that its Jewish life centred less on prayer than on "events, celebrations and informal gatherings".

In April 2018, she was among the rabbis scheduled to speak at a community event on harassment and inequality in the Jewish community in the era of the #MeToo movement, saying that congregants needed to know "that synagogues are safe spaces to talk about anything". That year, after Polansky announced that she was leaving for a pulpit in Kingston and a benefactor who had supported Neshamah since its founding decided to wind down that support, the congregation's leadership proposed a merger under which its members would join Temple Kol Ami, a Reform congregation of similar size.

=== Beth Israel Congregation, Kingston ===
Polansky became rabbi of Beth Israel Congregation in Kingston in 2018. As the congregation's only full-time professional, she ran its Hebrew school, led weekday, Shabbat and holiday services, and was responsible for pastoral care and community outreach. After two years at Beth Israel she was admitted to the Rabbinical Assembly, the association of Conservative rabbis. She also served as a member of the Queen's University Council.

After the October 7 attacks in 2023, Polansky, who worked closely with Queen's Hillel, told The Canadian Jewish News that Jewish students did not feel supported by the university's administration. She criticized a statement of solidarity with Palestinians signed by law students, which she said justified the attacks, and the law school's failure to respond to it, while praising a statement by Jane Philpott, then dean of the Faculty of Health Sciences.

=== Kehillat Beth Israel, Ottawa ===
In 2024, Kehillat Beth Israel (KBI), a Conservative synagogue in Ottawa, appointed Polansky as its senior rabbi. She began her tenure on October 6, 2024.

=== Return to Kingston ===
In November 2025, Polansky returned to her position as rabbi of Beth Israel in Kingston. After the 2026 Belleville synagogue shooting outside the Sons of Jacob synagogue in Belleville on Yom Kippur, she told The Kingston Whig-Standard that she had learned of the attack during her own service, and that the hostility she saw behind it had been building for at least three years and had intensified since October 7, 2023. She called on politicians to follow their statements of support with action, warning, "What starts with the Jews doesn't end with the Jews."

== Writing ==
Polansky has written opinion pieces for The Canadian Jewish News and ReformJudaism.org, the website of the Union for Reform Judaism.

In June 2018, she was one of about 40 Canadian rabbis who signed an open letter in The Canadian Jewish News condemning the separation of migrant families at the United States border.

== Personal life ==
Polansky is married to Adam Shapiro; they have a blended family of six children.
