= Thomas Weeks Robison =

Mayor of Kingston
- In office 1844–1855

Personal details
- Born: November 10, 1810 Napanee, Upper Canada
- Died: May 6, 1866 (aged 55)

Thomas Weeks Robison (November 10, 1810 – May 6, 1866) was a physician and politician in the Province of Canada. He served as mayor of Kingston from 1844 to 1845.

The son of Richard Robison, he was born in Napanee and was educated in Kingston. Robison studied medicine with James Sampson, then continued his studies at New York Medical College. In 1833, he passed the Upper Canada a Medical Board. He married Elenora Cummings Robison, a cousin. He served as surgeon for the 3rd Frontenac Battalion and was also medical officer for the Kingston Penitentiary.
