= Harvey Rosen =

Canadian mayor (1949–2022)

Mayor of Kingston, Ontario
- In office December 1, 2003 – November 30, 2010
- Preceded by: Isabel Turner
- Succeeded by: Mark Gerretsen

Personal details
- Born: 1949 Kingston, Ontario, Canada
- Died: September 8, 2022 (aged 72–73) Kingston, Ontario, Canada
- Occupation: Attorney, businessman, politician

Harvey Rosen (1949–2022) was the mayor of the city of Kingston, Ontario, Canada from 2003 to 2010.

== Early life and education ==
Rosen was born in Kingston in 1949. He obtained a Bachelor of Arts degree in Philosophy from York University in Toronto, and a Bachelor of Law degree from Queen's University in Kingston. He was called to the Ontario Bar in 1977.

== Political career ==
Rosen was elected to the council for the former Kingston Township in 1994, and in 1997 was elected to the Board of Control of the newly amalgamated City of Kingston. He practiced law privately until 2000 when he joined Rosen Corp. Ltd., a family-owned firm which at one point included Rosen Fuels, a fuel-oil company founded by Rosen's father.

== Mayor of Kingston ==
Rosen was elected the 94th Mayor of the City of Kingston on November 10, 2003. Following controversy over a downtown entertainment complex development, he was re-elected for a four-year term on November 13, 2006, by a slim margin of 730 votes, winning over runner-up candidate and Councillor Rick Downes. He did not seek reelection in 2010.

== Family ==
Rosen was the first Jewish mayor of Kingston. Rosen is also past president of Kingston's Beth Israel Congregation. His family were originally from the Lithuanian town of Anyksciai, which was almost wiped out during the Second World War. He has been married twice and has two sons.

== Seeks to enter federal, provincial politics ==
After finishing two terms as Kingston mayor, Rosen sought the federal Liberal nomination for the federal riding of Kingston and the Islands in 2010, after incumbent Peter Milliken, who was first elected in 1988, announced he would not run again. Rosen was one of five contenders; the eventual winner was Ted Hsu, who went on to retain the riding for the Liberals in the 2011 federal election.

Rosen announced he would seek the Ontario Liberal Party nomination for the provincial riding of Kingston and the Islands shortly after incumbent John Gerretsen, first elected in 1995, announced on Oct. 18, 2013, that he would not seek re-election. However, Rosen lost the Liberal nomination to Sophie Kiwala who went on to be elected MPP in the 2014 provincial election.
