= Kingston City Council =

Kingston City Council is the governing body for the City of Kingston, Ontario, Canada.

The council consists of the Mayor of Kingston and 12 city councillors elected by voters in geographic districts.

== Members 2022–2026 ==
Elected in the 2022 municipal election

- Mayor - Bryan Paterson
- Gary Oosterhof - Countryside District
- Paul Chaves - Loyalist-Cataraqui District
- Lisa Osanic - Collins-Bayridge District
- Wendy Stephen - Lakeside District
- Don Amos - Portsmouth District
- Jimmy Hassan - Trillium District
- Brandon Tozzo - Kingscourt-Rideau District
- Jeff McLaren - Meadowbrook-Strathcona District
- Vincent Cinanni - Williamsville District
- Conny Glenn - Sydenham District
- Gregory Ridge - King's Town District
- Ryan Boehme - Pittsburgh District

== Past members ==
=== Members 2018–2022 ===
- Mayor - Bryan Paterson
- Gary Oosterhof - Countryside District
- Simon Chapelle - Loyalist-Cataraqui District
- Lisa Osanic - Collins-Bayridge District
- Wayne Hill - Lakeside District
- Bridget Doherty - Portsmouth District
- Robert Kiley - Trillium District
- Mary Rita Holland - Kingscourt-Rideau District
- Jeff McLaren - Meadowbrook-Strathcona District
- Jim Neill - Williamsville District
- Peter Stroud - Sydenham District
- Rob Hutchison - King's Town District
- Ryan Boehme - Pittsburgh District

=== Members 2014–2018 ===
- Mayor - Bryan Paterson
- Gary Oosterhof - Countryside District (from June 6, 2017)*
- Kevin George - Loyalist-Cataraqui District
- Lisa Osanic - Collins-Bayridge District
- Laura Turner - Lakeside District
- Liz Schell - Portsmouth District
- Adam Candon - Trillium District
- Mary Rita Holland - Kingscourt-Rideau District
- Jeff McLaren - Meadowbrook-Strathcona District
- Jim Neill - Williamsville District
- Peter Stroud - Sydenham District
- Rob Hutchison - King's Town District
- Ryan Boehme - Pittsburgh District

* Richard Allen had been elected to the Countryside District seat but resigned effective December 20, 2016; the seat was to be filled by a by-election on 15 May 2017.

=== Members 2010–2014 ===
- Mayor - Mark Gerretsen
- Brian Reitzel - Pittsburgh District
- Sandy Berg - Kingscourt-Strathcona District
- Liz Schell - Portsmouth District
- Bill Glover - Sydenham District
- Dorothy Hector - Lakeside District
- Rob Hutchison - King's Town District
- Jeff Scott - Countryside District
- Kevin George - Loyalist-Cataraqui District
- Rick Downes - Cataraqui District
- Lisa Osanic - Collins-Bayridge District
- Bryan Paterson - Trillium District
- Jim Neill - Williamsville District

=== Members 2006–2010 ===
- Mayor - Harvey Rosen
- Leonore Foster - Pittsburgh District
- Steve Garrison - Kingscourt- Strathcona District
- Mark Gerretsen - Portsmouth District
- Bill Glover - Sydenham District
- Dorothy Hector - Lakeside District
- Rob Hutchison - King's Town District
- Joyce MacLeod-Kane - Countryside District
- Rob Matheson - Loyalist-Cataraqui District
- Sara Meers - Cataraqui District
- Lisa Osanic - Collins-Bayridge District
- Vicki Schmolka - Trillium District
- Ed Smith - Williamsville District

=== City Council 2003–2006 ===
- Mayor - Harvey Rosen
- George Stoparczyk - Trillium
- George Sutherland - Countryside
- Kevin George - Loyalist-Cataraqui
- George Beavis - Lakeside
- Sara Meers - Cataraqui
- Steve Garrison - Kingscourt Strathcona
- Beth Pater - Portsmouth
- Ed Smith - Williamsville
- Floyd Patterson - Sydenham
- Rick Downes - King's Town
- Leonore Foster - Pittsburgh
- Bittu George - Collins-Bayridge

== See also ==
- Votes of Kingston City Councillors by Councillor and by issue at the Kingston Taxpayer's Association website.
