= Charles Fuller Gildersleeve =

Canadian lawyer, business owner and politician

Charles Fuller Gildersleeve (October 17, 1833 – January 18, 1906) was a lawyer, business owner and politician in Ontario, Canada. He served as mayor of Kingston in 1879.

The son of Henry Gildersleeve and Sarah Finkle, he was born in Kingston and was educated at Upper Canada College. Gildersleeve was called to the Ontario bar in 1859 and joined his brother Overton Smith in the practice of law. He married Mary Elizabeth Herchmer. He took over the operation of the family steamship business after his brother died in 1864 and expanded that business. Gildersleeve formed the Lake Ontario and Bay of Quinte Steamboat Company in 1893 and, in 1894, he became general manager of the Richelieu and Ontario Navigation Company. In 1913, those companies became part of Canada Steamship Lines.

He served on Kingston city council for 22 years. He took part in the construction of the Kingston and Pembroke Railway and became he railway's president. Gildersleeve also helped establish the School of Mining, later the Department of Mining, at Queen's University.

He died in Kingston and was buried in Cataraqui Cemetery.

His son Henry, known as "H. H.", became president of the Bay of Quinte Steamboat Company, was general manager of the Northern Navigation Company of Sarnia and later served on the executive of Canada Steamship Lines.

His daughter Maud married Victor Brereton Rivers.
