= Mark Gerretsen =

Canadian politician

The Honourable Mark Gerretsen PC MP
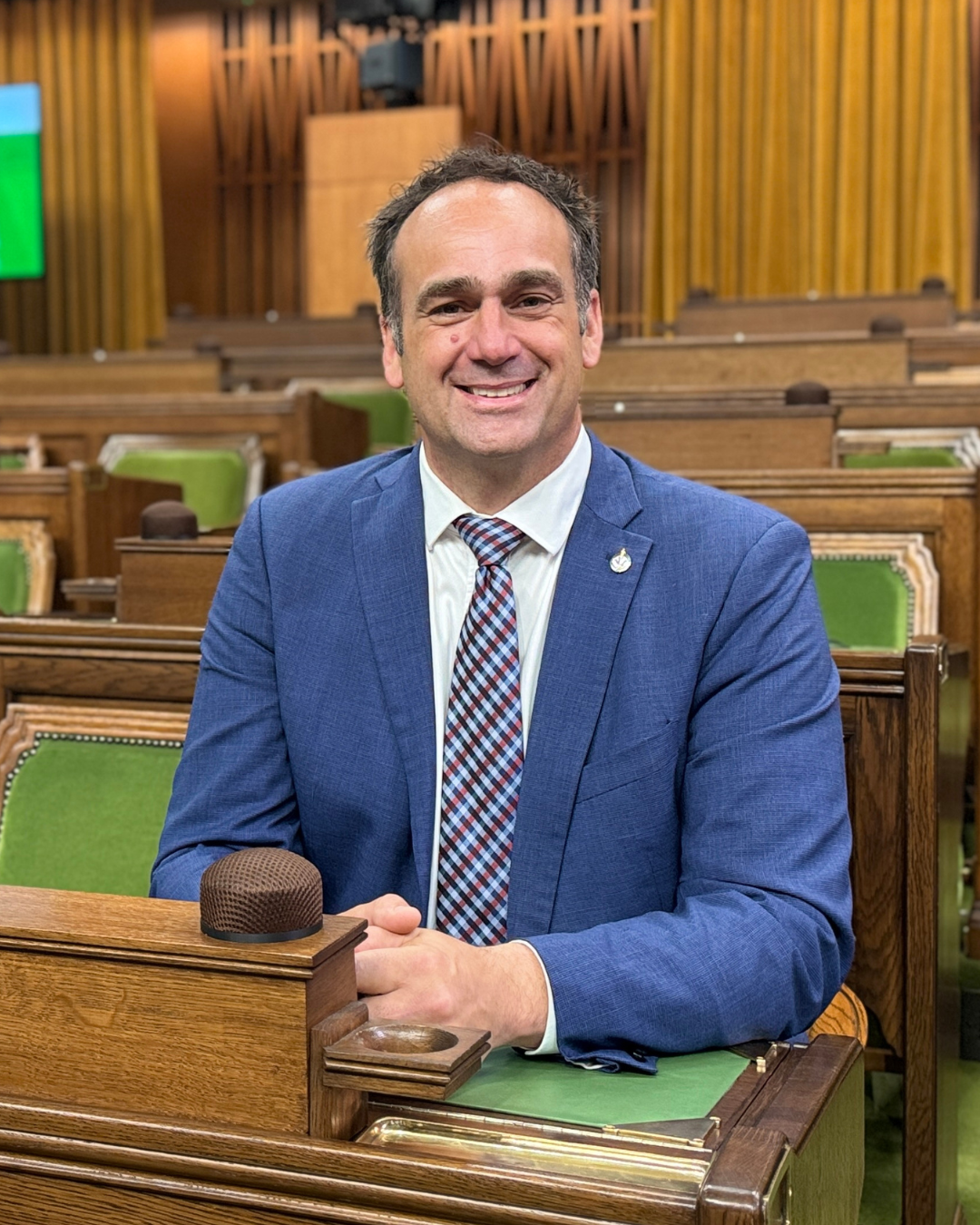
- Mark Gerretsen in Parliament, 2025

Chief Government Whip
- Incumbent
- Assumed office May 14, 2025
- Prime Minister: Mark Carney
- Preceded by: Rechie Valdez

Deputy Leader of the Government in the House of Commons
- In office September 16, 2023 – May 14, 2025
- Prime Minister: Justin Trudeau; Mark Carney
- Preceded by: Sherry Romanado
- Succeeded by: Arielle Kayabaga

Member of Parliament for Kingston and the Islands
- Incumbent
- Assumed office October 19, 2015
- Preceded by: Ted Hsu

Mayor of Kingston
- In office December 1, 2010 – December 1, 2014
- Preceded by: Harvey Rosen
- Succeeded by: Bryan Paterson

Personal details
- Born: John Mark Gerretsen; June 5, 1975 (age 51) Kingston, Ontario, Canada
- Party: Liberal
- Spouse: Vanessa Gerretsen
- Children: 3
- Parent: John Gerretsen (father)
- Education: Queen's University; St. Lawrence College

Mark Gerretsen MP (born June 5, 1975) is a Canadian politician who is the Member of Parliament for Kingston and the Islands as a member of the Liberal Party of Canada. He was first elected in the 2015 federal election, and re-elected in 2019, 2021 and 2025. He currently serves as the Chief Government Whip.

Previously, he has served as Deputy Leader of the government in the House of Commons and well as the Parliamentary Secretary to the Leader of the Government in the House of Commons (Senate).

== Early life and career ==
Gerretsen was born in Kingston, Ontario, the son of Assunta (Garofalo) and John Gerretsen. His father was mayor of Kingston and a MPP for Kingston and the Islands, and held several positions in the cabinets of Premier Dalton McGuinty and Kathleen Wynne. His father was born in Hilversum, Netherlands, and his mother emigrated from San Bartolomeo in Galdo (Benevento) Italy to Kingston in 1956.

Mark graduated from Regiopolis Notre-Dame in 1993. Gerretson then launched a DJ business, performing at events like the Regiopolis Notre-Dame pep rally. He eventually transitioned to DJing at Stages Night Club in Kingston, Ontario. Gerretsen holds a bachelor's degree in economics from Queen's University and studied computers at St. Lawrence College. Gerretsen was first elected to Kingston City Council in 2006, where he represented the Portsmouth District. After completing his four-year term as City Councillor, Gerretsen served as Mayor of Kingston from 2010 to 2014.

== Municipal politics ==
As Mayor, Gerretsen worked alongside the City of Kingston and municipal leaders across Ontario, advancing issues such as payments in lieu of taxes, the integration of social services, and increased investment in local infrastructure and affordable housing. Gerretsen also oversaw the creation of the Mayor's Task Force on Development to improve customer service for residents, and the development of an Age-Friendly Plan focused on making Kingston more senior-friendly.

In 2012, Gerretsen was elected to represent the City of Kingston on the Association of Municipalities of Ontario (AMO) Board of Directors. As a member of the Large Urban Mayor's Caucus of Ontario (LUMCO), Gerretsen worked with municipal leaders across Ontario advocating for increased investments in local infrastructure and affordable housing.

Gerretsen gained some notoriety in 2013 when he voiced his displeasure regarding the street partying that occurs during Queen's University's Homecoming. The event had taken a five-year hiatus due to rowdy behaviour and significant costs to the municipality for policing and clean up, and Gerretsen had reservations about the event's return. Gerretsen visited Aberdeen Street that weekend to assess the situation. He tweeted directly to Queen's Principal Daniel Woolf: “I am standing at William and Aberdeen. I have two words for you: NOT GOOD”. The “NOT GOOD” phrase was, in turn, used by Queen's University students and publicized in a number of memes at the Mayor's expense.

== Federal politics ==
Gerretsen was first elected as a Member of Parliament in the 2015 federal election, replacing first-term Liberal MP Ted Hsu, who chose not to seek re-election. Gerretsen defeated Conservative candidate Andy Brooke by over 21,000 votes and earned 55.37% of the ballots cast.

In his first term in federal office, Gerretsen served on the Standing Committee for National Defence, and was elected as Chair of the Ontario Liberal Caucus. Gerretsen was also a member of the Standing Committee on the Environment and Sustainable Development for two and a half years.

Throughout 2015–2019, Gerretsen was able to obtain federal funding for many initiatives in Kingston and the Islands. Some of these investments included $1 million for Breakwater Park and Gord Downie Pier, $42 million for public transit, $31 million for new ferry vessels and $60 million for the Third Crossing.

Gerretsen's Private Members Bill, Bill C-243, The National Maternity Assistance Program Strategy, aimed to introduce amendments to the Employment Insurance Act to create a national maternity assistance program for women who are unable to work during their pregnancy and was based on the first-hand experience of a constituent in his riding. Gerretsen's Private Members Bill was introduced to the House of Commons on February 26, 2016. After passing second and third reading in Parliament, on October 26 and June 14, 2017, respectively, Gerretsen's Private Members Bill was brought to the Senate for first reading on June 14, 2017. When Parliament dissolved in the summer of 2019, Bill C-243 was at the Senate for third reading.

Gerretsen supports many Liberal policies, but sometimes voices his concerns with the direction the government takes on various files. As a strong environmental proponent, Gerretsen openly spoke against the Government's decision to expand the Kinder Morgan pipeline. In June 2018, Mark was one of three Liberal MPs who voted in favour of a motion proposed by the New Democratic Party to stop the project.

In 2019, 2021, and 2025 Gerretsen was re-elected as Member of Parliament. Currently, Gerretsen is Chief Government Whip. Previously, he has served as Deputy Leader of the government in the House of Commons and well as the Parliamentary Secretary to the Leader of the Government in the House of Commons (Senate).

On June 13, 2023, Gerretsen was forced to apologize during a House of Commons debate, after being caught making a middle finger gesture directed at Conservative MP Kerry-Lynne Findlay https://x.com/i/status/1669067158431887360

On September 19, 2024, Gerretsen issued a public retraction for spreading disinformation about commentator Kat Kanada and announced that he was making a personal donation to a charity chosen by her.

== Personal life ==
Gerretsen and his wife Vanessa live in Kingston's east end with their three children Mason, Francesco and Vivian.

== Environment ==
While Mayor of Kingston, Gerretsen oversaw the launch of Sustainable Kingston, an organization launched by the city as a non-profit to support Kingston in achieving the vision of becoming Canada's most sustainable city. Gerretsen was also Mayor of Kingston when the City converted all street lights to LED.

Personally, Gerretsen was an early participant in the province of Ontario's Microfit program aimed at encouraging homeowners to install solar panels to feed electricity back into the grid. Gerretsen and his wife, Vanessa, have been driving electric vehicles since 2012.

== Electoral record ==
=== Federal ===
2025 Canadian federal election: Kingston and the Islands
Party	Candidate	Votes	%	±%	Expenditures
Liberal	Mark Gerretsen	48,682	63.23	+22.54	$120,473.94
Conservative	Bryan Paterson	23,592	30.64	+6.09	$127,560.23
New Democratic	Daria Juüdi-Hope	3,648	4.74	–24.06	$32,326.52
Green	Fintan Hartnett	1,071	1.39	–1.07	$3,473.55
Total valid votes		76,993	99.44	+0.11	$151,724.40
Total rejected ballots		432	0.56	–0.11	
Turnout		77,425	71.68	+4.77	
Eligible voters		108,014			
Liberal notional hold		Swing		+8.22	
Source: Elections Canada

2021 Canadian federal election: Kingston and the Islands
Party	Candidate	Votes	%	±%	Expenditures
Liberal	Mark Gerretsen	27,724	41.07	-4.69	$112,202.25
New Democratic	Vic Sahai	19,775	29.29	+6.04	$62,595.17
Conservative	Gary Oosterhof	16,019	23.73	+4.22	$81,382.35
People's	Shelley Sayle-Udall	2,314	3.43	+0.83	$4,795.67
Green	Waji Khan	1,673	2.48	-6.41	$12,283.32
Total valid votes/expense limit		67,505	99.35	–	$124,484.67
Total rejected ballots		445	0.65	-0.05	
Turnout		67,950	67.01	-2.41	
Eligible voters		101,401			
Liberal hold		Swing		-5.37	
Source(s) "Official Voting Results". Elections Canada.

2019 Canadian federal election: Kingston and the Islands
Party	Candidate	Votes	%	±%	Expenditures
Liberal	Mark Gerretsen	31,205	45.8	-9.37	$61,590.05
New Democratic	Barrington Walker	15,856	23.3	+6.39	none listed
Conservative	Ruslan Yakoviychuk	13,304	19.5	-3.5	none listed
Green	Candice Christmas	6,059	8.9	+4.19	none listed
People's	Andy Brooke	1,769	2.6		none listed
Total valid votes/expense limit		68,193	100.0		
Total rejected ballots		484			
Turnout		68,677	70.5		
Eligible voters		97,364			
Liberal hold		Swing		-7.88	
Source: Elections Canada

2015 Canadian federal election: Kingston and the Islands
Party	Candidate	Votes	%	±%	Expenditures
Liberal	Mark Gerretsen	36,421	55.37	+15.35	$146,934.43
Conservative	Andy Brooke	14,928	22.70	-11.36	$97,596.78
New Democratic	Daniel Beals	11,185	17.01	-4.61	$44,779.89
Green	Nathan Townend	2,933	4.46	+0.15	$7,750.70
Libertarian	Luke McAllister	305	0.46	–	–
Total valid votes/Expense limit		65,772	100.00		$230,365.62
Total rejected ballots		242	0.37	–	
Turnout		66,014	73.36	–	
Eligible voters		89,990			
Liberal hold		Swing		+13.36	
Source: Elections Canada

=== Municipal ===
Kingston Mayoral Election, 2010	Vote	%
Mark Gerretsen	17,096	56.41
Rob Matheson	6,905	22.78
Barrie Chalmers	5,486	18.10
John Last	377	1.24
Nathaniel Wilson	227	0.75
Kevin Lavalley	215	0.71
