= Beth Israel Congregation (Kingston, Ontario) =

- Location in Ontario

Religion
- Affiliation: Conservative Judaism
- Ecclesiastical or organisational status: Synagogue
- Leadership: Rabbi Erin Polansky
- Status: Active

Location
- Location: 116 Centre Street, Kingston, Ontario K7L 4E6
- Coordinates: 44.224974°N 76.504648°W

Architecture
- Type: Synagogue
- Groundbreaking: 1960
- Completed: 1961

Website
- kingston-bethisrael.ca

Beth Israel Congregation (Hebrew: בית ישראל) is a Conservative synagogue at 116 Centre Street in Kingston, Ontario. Founded in 1908 through the merger of the city's small Orthodox congregations, it is the oldest synagogue in Kingston. Its first synagogue, on Queen Street, was completed in 1910 and served the congregation until 1961, when it moved to its present building near Queen's University. Orthodox for more than a century, the congregation voted in 2012 to adopt Conservative ritual and later became fully egalitarian. It had about 150 member families in 2024.

== History ==
=== Early Jewish community ===
The first known Jews in Kingston were the brothers Abraham and Samuel Nordheimer, German immigrants who arrived around 1840 and ran a music store before moving to Toronto in 1844, where they became music dealers and piano manufacturers. Simon Oberndorffer, born in Bretten, Germany, in 1830, arrived around 1857 with his wife Celina and became the first Jew to settle permanently in the city. He built a cigar business that employed some 48 workers by about 1910, and in 1892 became an alderman for Cataraqui Ward, the first of several Kingston Jews to hold public office.

From about 1890, Jewish immigrants from central and eastern Europe began to arrive in Kingston, then a town of about 20,000, often drawn by relatives or friends already there. The community worshipped in small rooms, or shtiebels, and in 1897 formed the Hebrew Cemetery Company to buy burial plots in Cataraqui Cemetery. On April 15, 1902, the Kingston Independent Hebrew Congregation was inaugurated, with Oberndorffer as president, Saul Bennett as secretary and Louis Abramson as treasurer; annual dues were $3. A second congregation soon formed, partly as a result of a dispute among members, and by 1908 the community of about 125 people had three congregations, among them the Hebrew Congregation of Kingston and the Sons of Jacob.

=== Founding and the Queen Street synagogue ===
In January 1908, at a brit milah, the Kingston businessman Isaac Cohen promised to build a synagogue if the congregations united, and they merged later that year. Until a building was ready, services were held at the Oddfellows' Hall and the Windsor Hotel on Princess Street. The community bought land at 148 Queen Street in downtown Kingston, and on October 10, 1910, Oberndorffer, the congregation's first president, laid the cornerstone of the city's first synagogue, which took the name Beth Israel Orthodox Congregation. Rabbi H. Abramovitz of Montreal led the proceedings, and Kingston's mayor, Daniel Couper, and local clergy also spoke. The building was projected to cost just over $10,000; Kingston's Christian congregations gave $1,600 and the Canadian Locomotive Company $200, and in all about a fifth of the cost came from the wider community. The congregation's early board minutes were kept in Hebrew and Yiddish.

In its first decade, the congregation employed a succession of rabbi-teachers who also served as shochtim; Meyer Cohen, hired in 1909, was the first. Rabbi Saimon Petegorsky, who came from Ottawa in 1922 and served until 1934, acted as rabbi, cantor, teacher, shochet and mohel, organized a boys' minyan, campaigned for a Jewish library and was chaplain to Jewish inmates at Kingston Penitentiary. During the Second World War the congregation supported the Jewish Immigrant Aid Society and United Jewish Refugees, and in 1943 the synagogue hosted the wedding of a Royal Air Force serviceman. By 1947 the Queen Street building could no longer hold the children attending Hebrew school, and the congregation rented a store on Montreal Street for classrooms. Rabbi Abraham Pimontel, a Sephardic Jew born in Amsterdam, served from 1948 to 1955 and also directed the Hillel at Queen's University; his wife, Gertrude, broadened the Hebrew-school curriculum and promoted Jewish education for girls.

=== Move to Centre Street ===
Most of Kingston's Jews lived within walking distance of the Queen Street synagogue until the 1950s. In 1954 the congregation received letters patent incorporating it under Ontario's Corporations Act and acquired a large property on Centre Street, west of the Queen's campus, which included Otterburn House, an 1850s villa. The Queen Street synagogue was sold in 1958. Rabbi Karpol Bender, a South African who arrived from New York in 1959, led the fundraising for a new building and helped establish kashrut supervision and a modernized Talmud Torah. Ground was broken on July 10, 1960, and the new synagogue at 116 Centre Street, beside Otterburn, opened in 1961 with Hebrew-school classrooms; the congregation then numbered about 100 families. A consecration service was held on December 3, 1967, and the mortgage was burned in the early 1970s, after which Bender left for Bar-Ilan University in Israel. The Queen Street building was demolished, and in 1974 the city opened the Samuel Springer Memorial Parking Lot on the site, where the City of Kingston later placed a historical marker.

=== Growth and change ===
From the mid-1960s, Queen's University, St. Lawrence College, the Royal Military College, Kingston General Hospital and employers such as Alcan and DuPont brought Jewish academics, physicians and other professionals to Kingston from South Africa, the United States and larger Canadian cities. Many of the newcomers favoured a more liberal Judaism than the congregation's Orthodox founders, and the resulting tensions led a group of families to found a Reform congregation, Iyr Ha-Melech, in 1975. Beth Israel remained Orthodox; in 1968 it hired Rabbi Judah Mintz to expand its high-school program, and his wife, Gloria, started a nursery school.

The congregation thrived as an Orthodox community through the 1980s and 1990s, when its Talmud Torah was full. In 1982 Merle Koven became its president, possibly the first woman to lead an Orthodox synagogue in North America. In 1984 members voted to build a multi-purpose addition, funded by the Samuel S. Robinson Charitable Foundation, and a mikveh was completed in 1987. The congregation marked its 75th anniversary with a rededication on October 27, 1985, and published a history, From Strength to Strength. Rabbi Howard Finkelstein and then Rabbi Daniel Elkin led the congregation in this period. Elkin, a Montreal native who served from 1997 to 2012, was described in 1999 as the first Canadian-born rabbi the community had had; at that time the congregation had about 125 member families, kept separate seating for men and women, and had twice defeated motions to become Conservative.

The congregation celebrated its centenary from Simchat Torah in October 2009, culminating in a homecoming weekend on May 14–16, 2010, that included a concert, "100 Years of Jewish Music", at Grant Hall on the Queen's campus. A membership study for the anniversary found 142 member households in 2009, against 143 in 1976; while most members in 1976 had considered themselves Conservative or Orthodox, only two Orthodox families remained among members under 60. Kingston's mayor, Harvey Rosen, a former president of the congregation, predicted that a change of affiliation was coming.

=== Conservative affiliation ===
In the 2000s fewer families kept Orthodox practice, and it became difficult to gather a minyan for some Sabbath services. After Elkin retired in 2012, the congregation voted to adopt Conservative ritual. Members cited separate seating as the main grievance, along with a growing wish for women's participation; women began to be counted in the minyan and called to the Torah. Rabbi Shalom Plotkin, a graduate of the Jewish Theological Seminary, arrived in July 2012, and his installation, together with that of a new board, on January 25, 2013, completed the transition. Some members left over the change, and the congregation then had 130 member families. Over the following years it became fully egalitarian, a change the congregation credits with its revitalization; membership grew to about 150 families, 50 of them joining in the five years to 2024. The congregation is affiliated with the United Synagogue of Conservative Judaism.

Rabbi Erin Polansky, a Queen's graduate ordained by Hebrew Union College – Jewish Institute of Religion in 2000, came to Beth Israel after leading Neshamah Congregation of York Region from 2011 to 2018, and was later admitted to the Rabbinical Assembly. She left in 2024 to become spiritual leader of Kehillat Beth Israel in Ottawa, and returned to Beth Israel in 2025, where she continues to serve.

== Architecture ==
=== Queen Street synagogue ===
The first synagogue, at 148 Queen Street, was designed by Joseph William Power of the Kingston firm Power & Son. A brick building on a stone foundation, it had two entrances flanked by buttressed towers topped with ogee cupolas, and round-arched windows with small diamond panes; its domes echoed, on a modest scale, the Moorish style of Toronto's Holy Blossom synagogue of 1897.

=== Centre Street synagogue ===
The present synagogue was designed by Toronto architects. Its main sanctuary is lit by a domed skylight. The building stands beside Otterburn House on the property acquired in 1954, and was enlarged by a multi-purpose addition after 1984.

== Community life ==
Beth Israel holds Friday-evening and Saturday-morning services, conducted almost entirely in Hebrew, and runs the Bader Elkin Talmud Torah for children from kindergarten to grade seven, as well as adult education. It works with Queen's Hillel, whose Hillel House stands next to the synagogue, and the synagogue serves as the city's de facto Jewish community centre.
