= Isabel Turner =

British-born Canadian politician (1936–2021)

Mayor of Kingston, Ontario
- In office 2000–2003
- Preceded by: Gary H. Bennett
- Succeeded by: Harvey Rosen

Personal details
- Born: April 6, 1936 Kingston, Moray, Scotland
- Died: October 26, 2021 (aged 85) Kingston, Ontario, Canada
- Spouse: John Turner
- Children: 3

Isabel Turner (April 6, 1936 – October 26, 2021) was a British-born Canadian politician, who was Mayor of Kingston, Ontario from 2000 to 2003. She served as a board member of the St. Lawrence Parks Commission of the Ontario Ministry of Tourism and Culture between 2006 and 2012.

Turner died of pneumonia at Kingston General Hospital on October 26, 2021, at the age of 85.

== Early life ==
Turner was born in the village of Kingston in Moray, Scotland, and emigrated to Canada in 1956. She married dentist John Turner, also from Kingston, and they had three children, and six grandchildren together. She lived in Kingston, Ontario, from 1968 until her death.

== Career ==
Turner entered politics in 1980 and became the first woman councillor on Kingston Township Council. Elected in 1985, she went on to serve as reeve for the next 12 years, as well as on the Frontenac County Council. She was elected mayor of the amalgamated City of Kingston in 2000 and served in that position until 2003, when she was succeeded by Harvey Rosen.

In 2002, she was awarded the Queen's Golden Jubilee Medal in recognition of her many contributions to the Kingston community, and she thereafter had a public library branch in the Kingston Frontenac Public Library system named in her honour.
