= Flora MacDonald (politician) =

Canadian politician (1926–2015)

The Honourable Flora MacDonald PC CC OOnt ONS
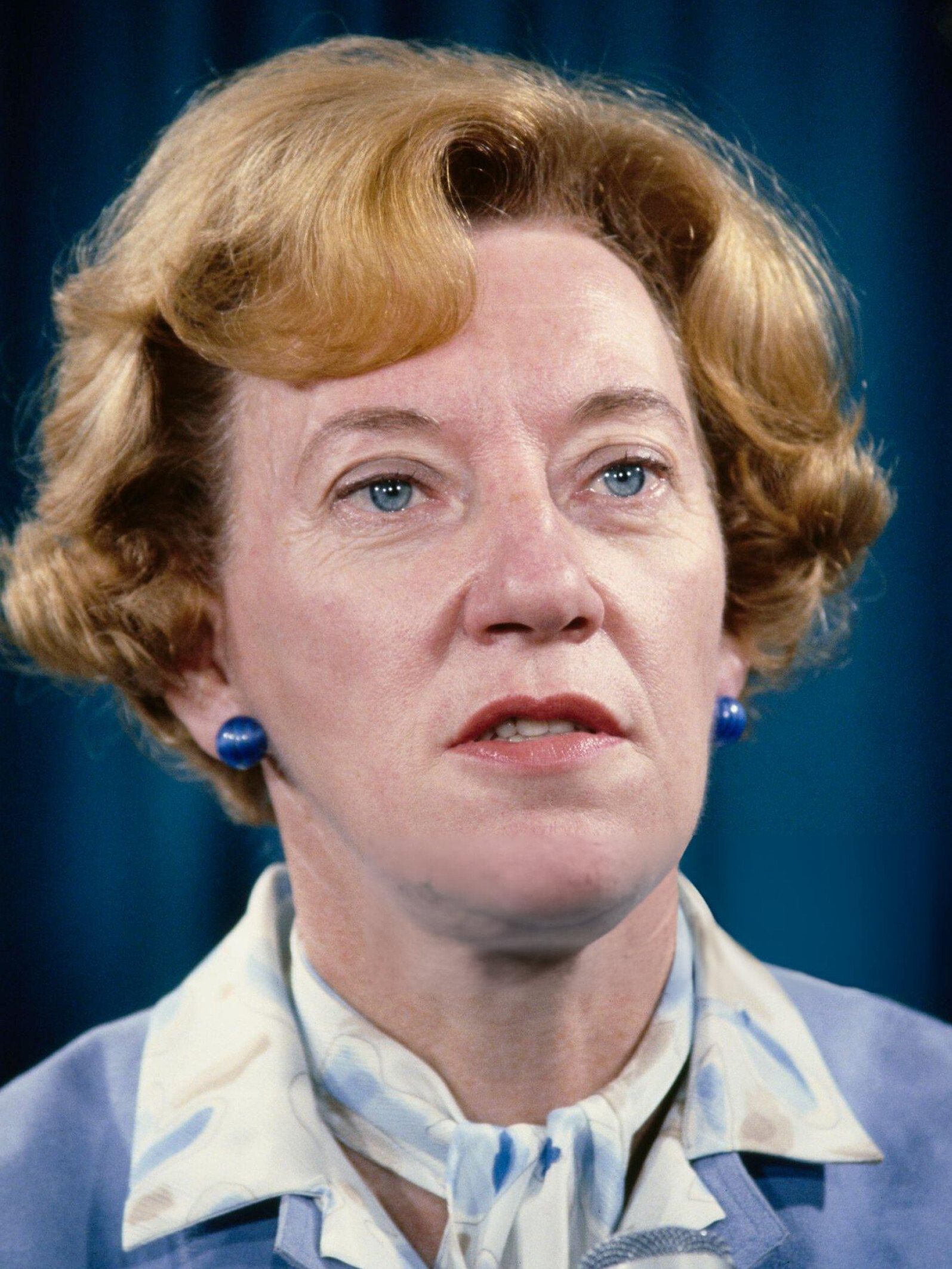
- MacDonald, c. 1979

Secretary of State for External Affairs
- In office June 4, 1979 – March 2, 1980
- Prime Minister: Joe Clark
- Preceded by: Don Jamieson
- Succeeded by: Mark MacGuigan

Minister of Communications
- In office June 30, 1986 – December 7, 1988
- Prime Minister: Brian Mulroney
- Preceded by: Marcel Masse
- Succeeded by: Lowell Murray (acting); Marcel Masse

Minister of Employment and Immigration
- In office September 17, 1984 – June 29, 1986
- Prime Minister: Brian Mulroney
- Preceded by: John Roberts
- Succeeded by: Benoît Bouchard

Member of Parliament for Kingston and the Islands
- In office October 30, 1972 – November 20, 1988
- Preceded by: Edgar Benson
- Succeeded by: Peter Milliken

Personal details
- Born: Flora Isabel MacDonald; June 3, 1926 North Sydney, Nova Scotia, Canada
- Died: July 26, 2015 (aged 89) Ottawa, Ontario, Canada
- Party: Progressive Conservative (1950s–2003)

Flora Isabel MacDonald PC CC OOnt ONS (June 3, 1926 – July 26, 2015) was a Canadian politician and humanitarian. Canada's first female foreign minister, she was also one of the first women to vie for leadership of a major Canadian political party, the Progressive Conservatives. She became a close ally of Prime Minister Joe Clark, serving in his cabinet from 1979 to 1980, as well as in the cabinet of Prime Minister Brian Mulroney from 1984 to 1988. In her later life, she was known for her humanitarian work abroad. Jimmy Carter has said that 90% of the contribution to freeing American hostages in Iran should be attributed to her and Kenneth D. Taylor. The City of Ottawa recognised MacDonald on July 11, 2018, by naming a new bicycle and footbridge (opening 2019) over the Rideau Canal the Flora Footbridge.

== Early life and career ==
MacDonald was born in North Sydney, Nova Scotia, the daughter of Mary Isabel Royle and George Frederick MacDonald. She was one of 6 children and of Scottish ancestry. MacDonald was raised in Cape Breton, Nova Scotia.

Her grandfather had been a clipper ship captain who sailed around Africa and South America. Her father was in charge of North Sydney’s Western Union trans-Atlantic telegraph terminus.

In her youth, Macdonald trained as a secretary at Empire Business College and found work as a bank teller at the Bank of Nova Scotia. She used her savings to travel to Britain in 1950 where she got involved with a group of Scottish nationalists who stole the Stone of Scone from Westminster Abbey and brought it to Scotland.

After hitchhiking through Europe, she returned to Canada and became involved in politics, working on Nova Scotia Progressive Conservative leader Robert Stanfield's campaign which won an upset victory in the 1956 provincial election.

Later the same year, she was hired to work in the national office of the Progressive Conservative Party under leader John Diefenbaker, as secretary to the party's chairman, and worked on Diefenbaker's 1957 and 1958 election campaigns.

In 1959, she was working as a secretary in the office of Prime Minister of Canada John Diefenbaker.

She continued working for the party in various capacities but grew disillusioned with Diefenbaker and was fired by him when he learned of her support for party president Dalton Camp's campaign for a leadership review. She worked for the Department of Political Studies at Queen's University in Kingston, Ontario, while continuing to support the anti-Diefenbaker camp and worked on Robert Stanfield's successful campaign during the 1967 Progressive Conservative leadership election and worked for him during the 1968 federal election.

== Member of Parliament ==
MacDonald was first elected to the House of Commons in the 1972 general election as the Progressive Conservative Member of Parliament for the Ontario riding of Kingston and the Islands. She remained in parliament until her defeat in the 1988 election by the Liberal candidate, future Speaker Peter Milliken.

At the 1976 PC leadership convention, she became the second woman to mount a serious campaign for the leadership of one Canada's major parties. In this, she had been preceded by Rosemary Brown who came in second in her 1975 bid for the leadership of the New Democratic Party. Although she was perceived as a strong candidate for the position, MacDonald fared worse than expected, winning just 214 votes on the first ballot despite having over 300 pledged delegates in her camp. This led pundits to coin the phrases Flora Syndrome and Flora Factor for the phenomenon of a female politician's promised support failing to materialise. MacDonald dropped off after the second ballot, and encouraged her supporters to vote for Joe Clark, the eventual winner.

== Minister of External Affairs ==
Clark and MacDonald, both moderates, became allies throughout their careers. When Clark became Prime Minister of Canada in 1979, MacDonald became the first female Secretary of State for External Affairs in Canadian history, and one of the first female foreign ministers anywhere in the world.

During MacDonald's tenure, she had to deal with the Vietnamese boat people refugee crises that followed the end of the Vietnam War. MacDonald and Immigration Minister Ron Atkey developed a plan in which the Canadian federal government would match the number of refugees sponsored by members of the general public, allowing more than 60,000 Vietnamese refugees to enter Canada.

The Iran hostage crisis was also a major issue during MacDonald's term. Six American diplomats had escaped the seizure of the American embassy by radical Iranian students and had sought refuge in the Canadian embassy in Tehran. MacDonald prevailed upon Prime Minister Joe Clark’s cabinet to approve by Order in Council the special issuance of Canadian passports as well as money to the six as part of a plan to rescue the escapees that had the Americans pose as Canadians and leave the country with Canadian staff when the embassy was closed on January 28, 1980, although she was not able to discuss her role publicly. The successful operation became known as the Canadian Caper, and it was later dramatized in the Academy Award-winning film Argo.

MacDonald's tenure as foreign minister was short-lived, however, as Clark's minority government was defeated on an amendment to the budget in December 1979, while MacDonald was on government business in Brussels. The PCs were voted out of office in the subsequent federal election held on February 18, 1980, although MacDonald held her seat.

== Return to Opposition ==
The Conservatives returned to the Opposition benches in 1980. MacDonald served as critic for External Affairs, her old cabinet portfolio. While Clark continued as party leader, his position was challenged by calls for a leadership review which ultimately led to the 1983 leadership convention. MacDonald supported Clark in his campaign to regain the leadership, but Clark lost to Brian Mulroney.

== Return to government ==
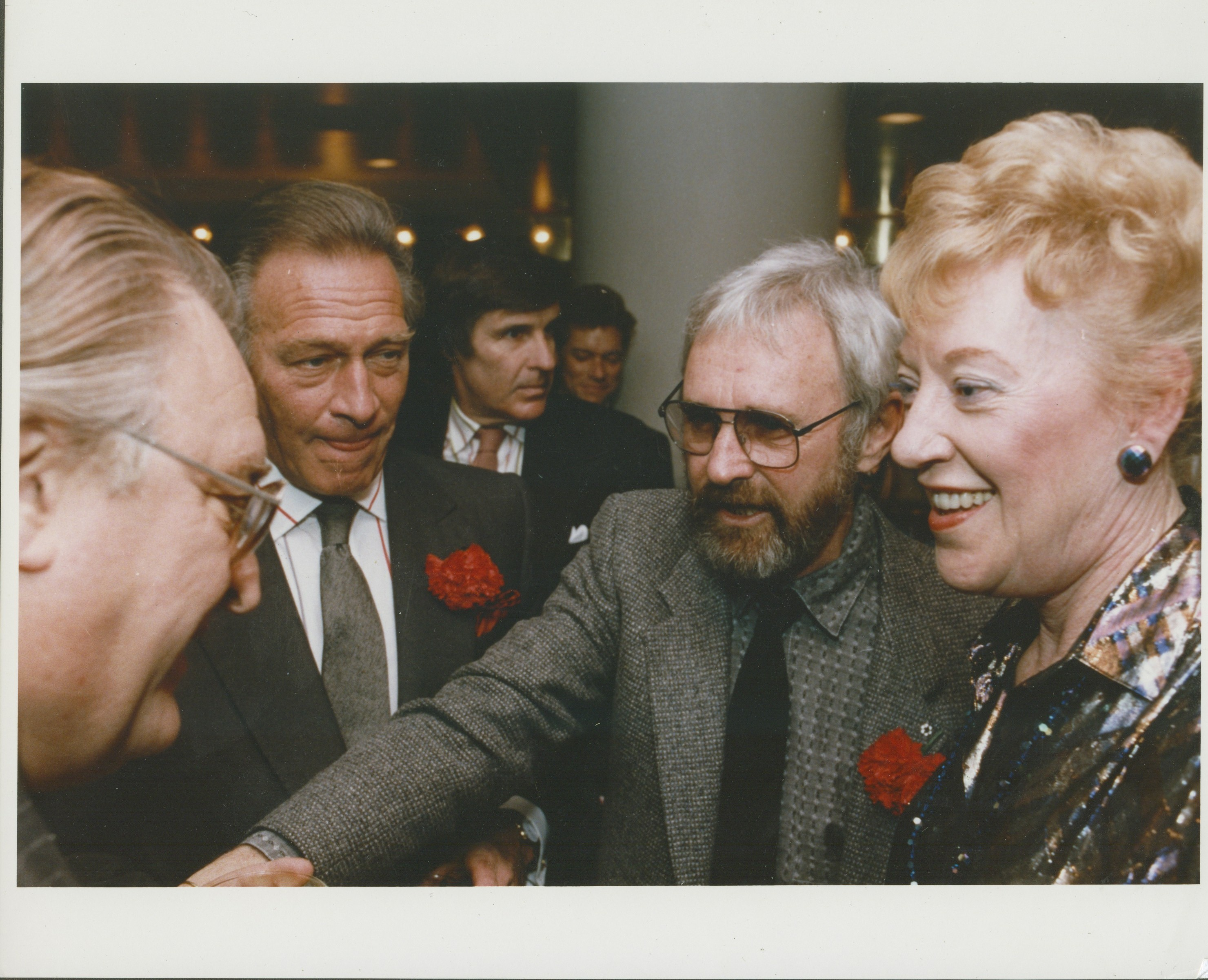
MacDonald (right) with Christopher Plummer and Norman Jewison in 1987

MacDonald returned to government after the PC victory in the 1984 federal election, serving first as Minister of Employment and Immigration from 1984 to 1986, and then as Minister of Communications from 1986 to 1988, under Prime Minister Mulroney. A Red Tory, MacDonald, within the federal cabinet, argued against Mulroney's push for free trade with the United States but publicly supported the Canada–United States Free Trade Agreement in the 1988 federal election. While the Progressive Conservatives won the election, which was fought on the free trade issue, MacDonald lost her seat to Liberal Peter Milliken. "I thought I deserved better than to be defeated after working so hard," MacDonald later stated.

== After politics ==
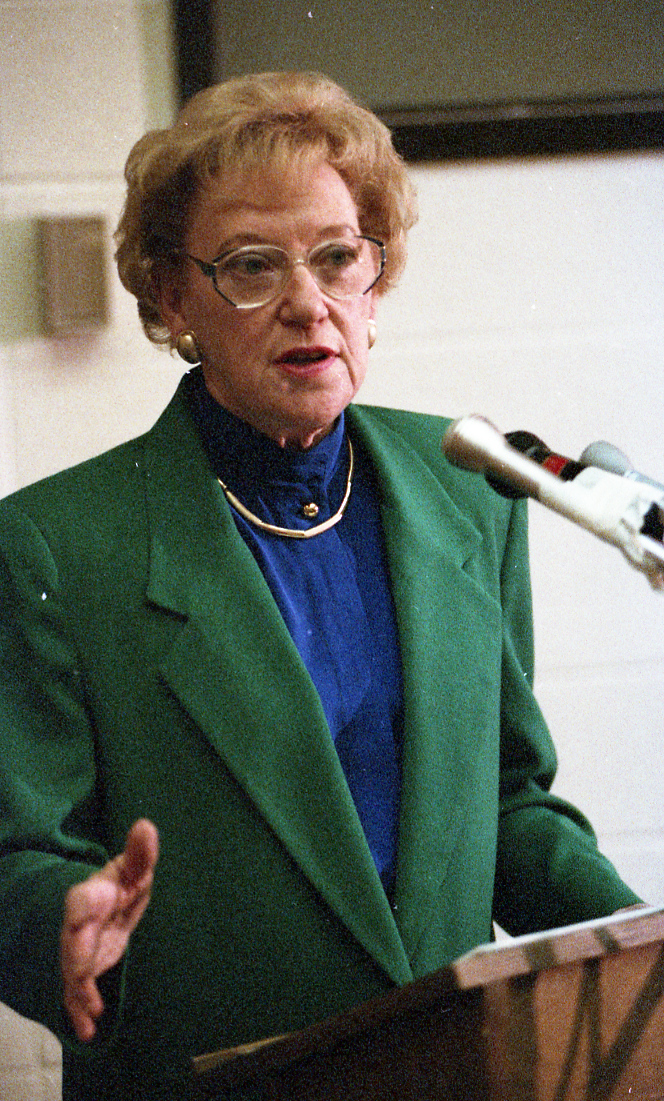
MacDonald speaking at an event in Belleville, 1994

After losing her seat in 1988, MacDonald quit politics and devoted her time to international humanitarian work. She served as Chair of the Board of Canada's International Development Research Centre from 1992 to 1997, and was also president of the World Federalist Movement-Canada.

In 2003, she briefly re-entered the political scene to oppose the merger of the Progressive Conservative Party of Canada and the Canadian Alliance, but was unable to prevent the folding of the PCs into the new Conservative Party of Canada. According to journalist Thomas Walkom, she voted for the New Democratic Party in the 2004 federal election. She was also a supporter of the Campaign for the Establishment of a United Nations Parliamentary Assembly, an organisation which campaigns for democratic reformation of the United Nations, and the creation of a more accountable international political system.

== Death ==
MacDonald died in Ottawa on July 26, 2015, at the age of 89. Her death met with an outpouring of praise from figures across the political spectrum in Canada. Peter Milliken, who defeated her in the 1988 election, hailed her as a trailblazer for women in politics and said she did an "incredible job" as the country's foreign minister. Rodney MacDonald (no relation), a former premier of Nova Scotia, said she inspired generations of Canadians and was widely respected. Joe Clark, her onetime rival for leadership and later ally in PC politics, said she "changed lives across our country" and "around the world".

== Honours ==
- Sworn in as a member of the Queen's Privy Council for Canada on June 4, 1979, giving her the honorific prefix "The Honourable" and the post-nominal letters "PC" for life.
- Kingston's prominent 400-boat harbour in front of City Hall is named the Flora MacDonald Confederation Basin in her honour.
- Appointed Officer of the Order of Canada in 1992.
- Received the Order of Ontario in 1995.
- Promoted to Companion of the Order of Canada in 1998.
- Recipient of the Pearson Medal of Peace in 2000.
- Awarded the Padma Shri, a civilian award, by the Government of India in 2004.
- Peter Raymont made a National Film Board documentary of her 1976 leadership bid, entitled Flora.
- Made a Member of the Order of Nova Scotia in 2007.
- St. Andrew's Society of Toronto Scot of the Year Award, 2009.
- Recipient of the Canada World Peace Award, awarded by the World Federalist Movement-Canada, October 2010.
- Advisory Council member of the Dancer Transition Resource Centre.
- Awarded the Canadian Version of the Queen Elizabeth II Golden Jubilee Medal in 2002.
- Awarded the Canadian Version of the Queen Elizabeth II Diamond Jubilee Medal in 2012.
- Awarded a Lifetime Achievement Award by Maclean's magazine in 2014.
- The City of Ottawa recognised MacDonald on July 11, 2018, by naming a new footbridge over the Rideau Canal the "Flora Footbridge".

Ribbon bars of Flora MacDonald

=== Honorary degrees ===
Country	Date	School	Degree
Nova Scotia, Canada	1979	Mount Saint Vincent University	Doctor of Humane Letters (DHL)
Ontario, Canada	May 1980	McMaster University	Doctor of Laws (LL.D)
Ontario, Canada	1981	Queen's University	Doctor of Laws (LL.D)
New York, United States	May 8, 1988	Potsdam College	Doctor of Humane Letters (DHL)
Ontario, Canada	Spring 1989	York University	Doctor of Laws (LL.D)
Ontario, Canada	May 18, 1990	Royal Military College of Canada	Doctor of Laws (LL.D)
Ontario, Canada	1996	Carleton University	Doctor of Laws (LL.D)
North Carolina, United States	1996	St. Andrews University	Doctor of Humane Letters (DHL)
Ontario, Canada	June 12, 1998	Brock University	Doctor of Laws (LL.D)
Newfoundland and Labrador, Canada	May 2003	Memorial University of Newfoundland	Doctor of Laws (LL.D)
Nova Scotia, Canada	May 2003	Cape Breton University	Doctor of Laws (LL.D)
Nova Scotia, Canada	May 23, 2003	Saint Mary's University	Doctor of Civil Law (DCL)
New Brunswick, Canada	2004	Mount Allison University	Doctor of Laws (LL.D)
Ontario, Canada	2006	University of Waterloo	Doctor of Laws (LL.D)
Ontario, Canada	June 12, 2007	University of Western Ontario	Doctor of Laws (LL.D)
Ontario, Canada	2008	Trent University	Doctor of Laws (LL.D)
Nova Scotia, Canada	May 2, 2010	St. Francis Xavier University	Doctor of Laws (LL.D)
Ontario, Canada	Fall 2010	University of Windsor	Doctor of Laws (LL.D)

== Film ==
MacDonald’s bid to become the first female leader of the Progressive Conservatives was the subject of Peter Raymont’s 1977 National Film Board of Canada documentary film Flora: Scenes From a Leadership Convention, which premiered at the Toronto International Film Festival.

== Electoral record ==
1988 Canadian federal election: Kingston and the Islands
Party	Candidate	Votes	%	±%	
Liberal	Peter Milliken	23,121	40.6	+12.9	$38,348
Progressive Conservative	Flora MacDonald	20,409	35.9	−19.2	$46,265
New Democratic	Len Johnson	11,442	20.1	+7.5	$47,572
Christian Heritage	Terry Marshall	1,646	2.9	–	$15,262
Libertarian	John Hayes	301	0.5	0.0	$1,295
Total valid votes		56,919	100.0		
Turnout		57,188	74.26		
Electors on the lists		77,014			

1984 Canadian federal election: Kingston and the Islands
Party	Candidate	Votes	%	±%
Progressive Conservative	Flora MacDonald	25,997	55.1	+13.3
Liberal	George Speal	13,087	27.7	-11.5
New Democratic	Andrew Currie	5,950	12.6	-5.4
Independent	Daniel Eardley ("Pro-Life Party")	1,410	3.0	
Green	Ted Bond	478	1.0	
Libertarian	Ian Murray	258	0.5	
Total valid votes		47,180	100.0	

1980 Canadian federal election: Kingston and the Islands
Party	Candidate	Votes	%	±%
Progressive Conservative	Flora MacDonald	18,146	41.8	-5.9
Liberal	John Coleman	17,039	39.3	+6.0
New Democratic	Stephen Foster	7,830	18.0	-0.9
Rhinoceros	Edward Sharp	373	0.9	
Total valid votes		43,388	100.0	

1979 Canadian federal election: Kingston and the Islands
Party	Candidate	Votes	%	±%
Progressive Conservative	Flora MacDonald	21,277	47.7	+1.5
Liberal	Peter Beeman	14,866	33.3	-2.8
New Democratic	Stephen Foster	8,472	19.0	+1.2
Total valid votes		44,615	100.0	

1974 Canadian federal election: Kingston and the Islands
Party	Candidate	Votes	%	±%
Progressive Conservative	Flora MacDonald	17,839	46.2	-7.3
Liberal	Peter Watson	13,943	36.1	+3.1
New Democratic	Lars Thompson	6,870	17.8	+4.2
Total valid votes		38,652	100.0	

1972 Canadian federal election: Kingston and the Islands
Party	Candidate	Votes	%	±%
Progressive Conservative	Flora MacDonald	22,824	53.4	+17.3
Liberal	John Hazlett	14,079	33.0	-16.7
New Democratic	Lars Thompson	5,807	13.6	-0.6
Total valid votes		42,710	100.0	

== Archives ==
There is a Flora MacDonald fonds at Library and Archives Canada.
