= Helen Cooper (politician) =

Canadian politician and administrator

Helen Cooper (born 13 November 1946) is an Australian-born Canadian politician and administrator. She served as mayor of Kingston, Ontario from 1988 to 1993, and was chair of the Ontario Municipal Board from 1993 to 1996.

== Early life and education ==
Cooper was born in Australia, and moved to Kingston with her family as a child. She graduated from Kingston Collegiate and Vocational Institute, received a Bachelor of Science degree from Queen's University in 1968, and worked overseas for a few years in development programs. She met her husband when working as a teacher in northern Tanzania. In 1973, she received a Master of Science degree from the London School of Economics in England. Cooper returned to Kingston after her graduation, and worked part-time as a teacher at Queen's and St. Lawrence College.

== Local councillor ==
She was elected to Kingston City Council as an alderman for the Sydenham Ward in 1980, and was re-elected in 1982 and 1985. In 1985, she became the first member of council to vote in favour of a Gay Pride Day for the city. There was a strong reaction against this decision, and she reversed her position after what the Kingston Whig-Standard described as "many vicious hate calls". When Cooper first campaigned for mayor in 1988, she pledged not to proclaim a Gay Pride Day if elected. She later regretted this decision, and again supported a Gay Pride proclamation when running for re-election in 1991.

== Mayor ==
Cooper was first elected as mayor in 1988, defeating rival candidate Joe Hawkins by over 3,000 votes. She became the first female mayor of Kingston. She was re-elected over Hawkins by a greater margin in 1991, and served as president of the Association of Municipalities of Ontario in 1991–92.

As mayor, Cooper initiated a Community Economic Advisory Committee which helped establish a civic airport building and a Technology Transfer Centre for Queen's University. She was the only mayoral candidate to support a city takeover of the Kingston Public Utilities Commission in 1991, and despite her personal victory was unable to convince Kingston voters to accept the measure in a referendum. She later presided over a property tax re-assessment in 1992, which resulted in significant increases for some residents. With one year remaining in her second term, she resigned in 1993 to accept a three-year appointment as chair of the Ontario Municipal Board.

== Federal politics ==
Cooper returned to political life in early 1997, when she campaigned for the federal Progressive Conservative nomination in the riding of Kingston and the Islands. She had not previously been a member of the party, but was persuaded to run by national leader Jean Charest. The other nomination candidates regarded her with suspicion: Doug Haunts described her as "socialist-oriented" and a possible New Democratic Party plant, while Blair MacLean referred to her as an opportunist with no roots in the party. Despite these criticisms, she won the nomination with 230 votes, against 132 for MacLean and 89 for Haunts.

Although considered a star candidate, she finished a distant second against Liberal incumbent Peter Milliken in the 1997 federal election. After the election, some observers argued that voters had difficulty associating her with a right-of-centre party, and speculated that this hurt her chances of election. Alan Whitehorn, professor at Royal Military College, said "I would describe her philosophically as a left-liberal. She's certainly no neo-conservative". Milliken himself argued that Cooper "should have run as a Liberal" under ideal circumstances.

Cooper remained active in the Progressive Conservative Party after her defeat, and supported Hugh Segal's bid for the leadership in 1998. In 2000, she spoke at a gravesite ceremony honouring the legacy of John A. Macdonald, Canada's first prime minister and a longtime Kingston resident. In 2002, she was appointed to the Nuclear Waste Management Organization's (NWMO) Advisory Council.

== Later career ==
As of 2005, Cooper was employed with the Minister of Community and Social Services. From 2006 until her retirement in 2014, she was a manager within the ministry with her final position being a manager responsible for delivery of programs for adult development services. After retiring from the ministry, she was appointed a distinguished fellow at the School for Policy Studies at Queen's University.
