= Flora Footbridge =

Bridge in Ottawa, Canada

Coordinates: 45.40446°N 75.68085°W

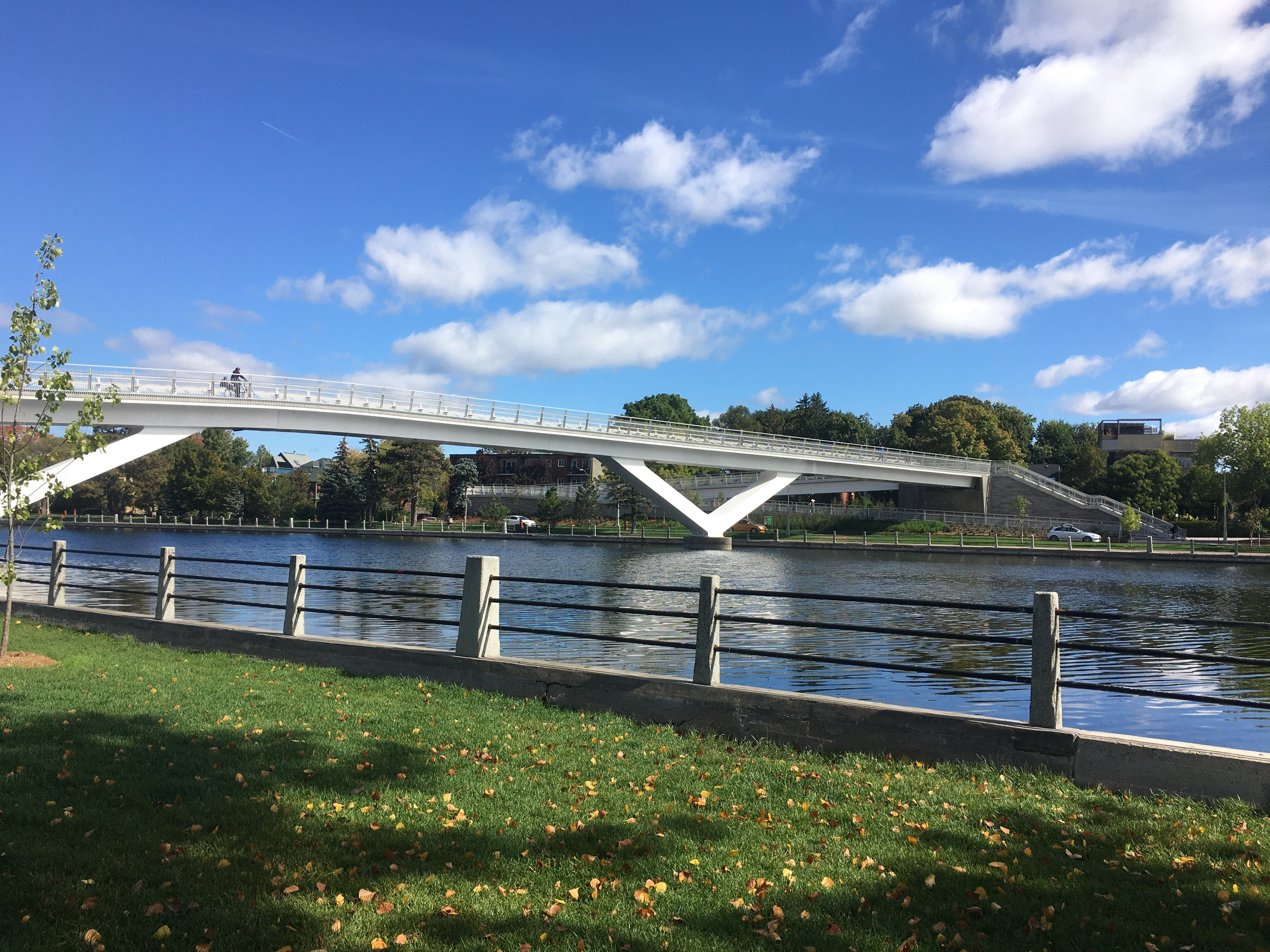
Flora Footbridge in Ottawa

The Flora Footbridge, named after Flora MacDonald, is a pedestrian/cycling bridge in Ottawa, Ontario, Canada, that spans the Rideau Canal, connecting Clegg Street in Old Ottawa East to Fifth Avenue in the Glebe. It also crosses Colonel By Drive.

The bridge is 5 m wide and 123 m long. Construction started in 2018. Originally scheduled to be completed in fall 2019, the bridge opened to the public ahead of schedule on June 28, 2019.
