= Overton Smith Gildersleeve =

Canadian politician (1825–1864)

Overton Smith Gildersleeve (January 13, 1825 – March 9, 1864) was a lawyer, business owner and politician in Canada West. He served as mayor of Kingston from 1855 to 1856 and from 1861 to 1862.

The son of Henry Gildersleeve and Sarah Finkle, he was born in Kingston and was educated there. He went on to study law, was called to the Ontario bar in 1849 and set up practice in Kingston the following year. Also in 1850, Gildersleeve married Louisa Anne, the daughter of William Henry Draper. His wife and father both died in 1851. Gildersleeve took over the family shipping and shipbuilding business. His brother Charles joined him in his law practice in 1859. In partnership with John Hamilton, Gildersleeve provided steamship service between Hamilton, Toronto, Kingston and Montreal. He also promoted the development of branch railways in the Kingston area.

He was elected to Kingston council in 1854 and became mayor the following year when John Counter was forced to resign. He was elected mayor in 1861. Gildersleeve ran unsuccessfully for the Cataraqui seat on the Legislative Council of the Province of Canada in 1858, losing to Alexander Campbell, and for the Kingston seat in the Legislative Assembly of the Province of Canada in 1863, losing to John A. Macdonald.

He died of an "apoplectic seizure" in Kingston at the age of 39 and was buried in Cataraqui Cemetery. His brother Charles took over the family business.
