= Peter Milliken =

Canadian lawyer and politician (born 1946)

The Honourable Peter Milliken PC OC FRSC UE
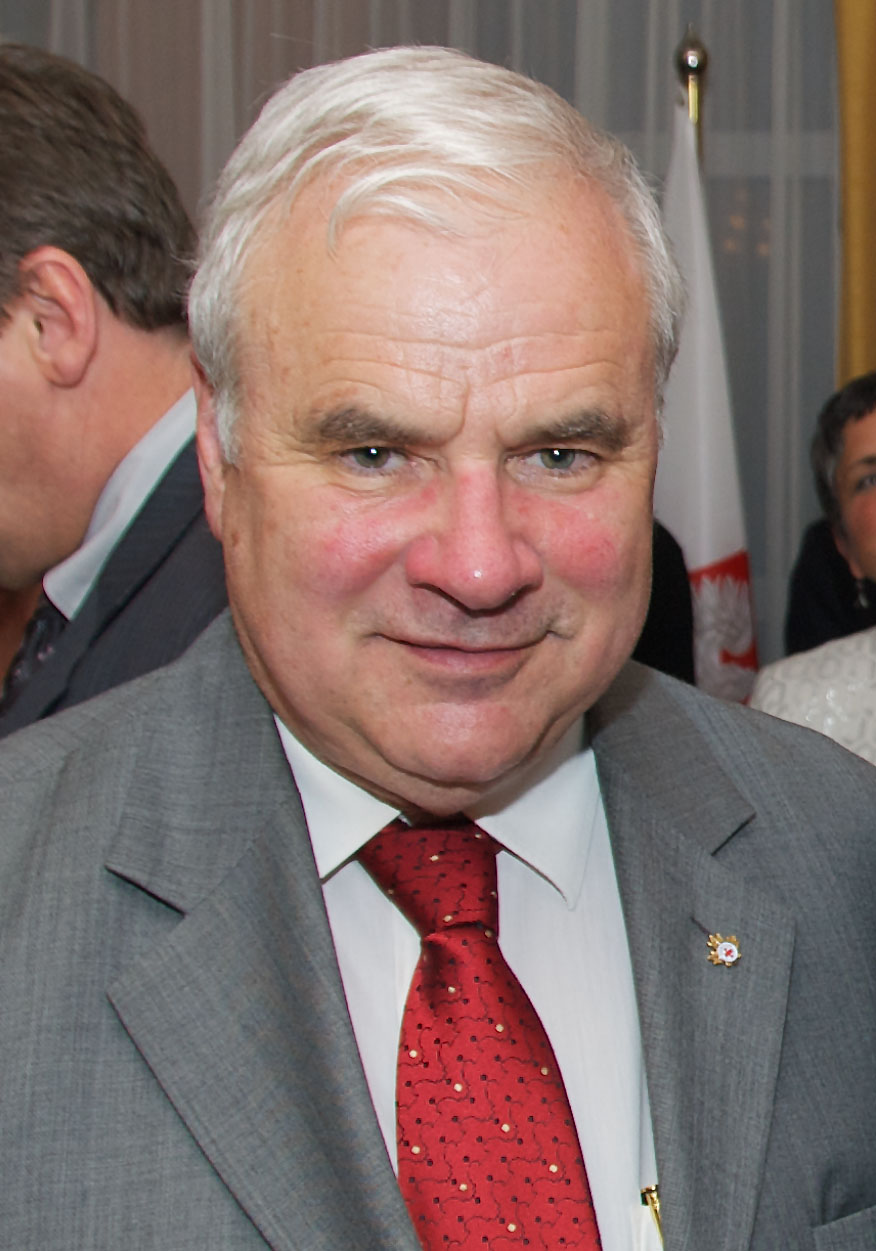
- Milliken in 2011

34th Speaker of the House of Commons
- In office January 29, 2001 – June 2, 2011
- Preceded by: Gilbert Parent
- Succeeded by: Andrew Scheer

Member of Parliament for Kingston and the Islands
- In office November 21, 1988 – May 2, 2011
- Preceded by: Flora MacDonald
- Succeeded by: Ted Hsu

Personal details
- Born: Peter Andrew Stewart Milliken; November 12, 1946 (age 80) Kingston, Ontario, Canada
- Party: Liberal
- Relatives: John Matheson (Cousin)
- Education: Queen's University (BA); Wadham College, Oxford (BA, MA); Dalhousie University (LLB)
- Profession: Solicitor and barrister, lawyer, politician

Peter Andrew Stewart Milliken PC OC FRSC UE (born November 12, 1946) is a Canadian lawyer and politician. He was a member of the House of Commons of Canada from 1988 until his retirement in 2011 and served as Speaker of the House for 10 years beginning in 2001. Milliken represented the Ontario riding of Kingston and the Islands as a member of the Liberal Party. On October 12, 2009, he became the longest serving Speaker of the House of Commons in Canadian history. His Speakership was notable for the number of tie-breaking votes he was required to make as well as for making several historic rulings. Milliken also has the unique distinction of being the first Speaker to preside over four Houses of Commons. His legacy includes his landmark rulings on Parliament's right to information, which are key elements of parliamentary precedent both in Canada and throughout the Commonwealth.

Milliken chose to stand down from Parliament at the 2011 federal election. His successor as Speaker, Andrew Scheer, was elected on June 2, 2011.

== Early life and career ==
Milliken was born in Kingston, Ontario, the eldest of seven children to a physician father, and is a descendant of United Empire Loyalists who left the new United States of America after the American Revolution. He is the cousin of John Matheson, a former Liberal Member of Parliament (MP) best known for his prominent role in adopting the red maple leaf as the Flag of Canada. Milliken holds a Bachelor of Arts degree in Political Science and Economics from Queen's University (1968), a Bachelor of Arts (1970) and Master of Arts (1978) in Jurisprudence from Oxford University, (Wadham College), in England, and a Bachelor of Laws (1971) degree from Dalhousie University. He was active in student politics, and served a year as speaker of the student government's assembly at Queen's. In 1967-68, he worked as a special assistant to federal cabinet minister George J. McIlraith.

Called to the Ontario Bar in 1973, Milliken was a partner at the prestigious Kingston law firm, Cunningham, Swan, Carty, Little & Bonham, before entering political life. He also lectured on a part-time basis at the Queen's University School of Business from 1973 to 1981, became a governor of the Kingston General Hospital in 1977, and has been a trustee with the Chalmers United Church. As a consultant, he produced the Milliken Report on the future of Queen's University athletics in the late 1970s. A fan of classical music, he has sung with the Pro Arte Singers and the Chalmers United Church Choir as well as serving on the board of the Kingston Symphony. He also often canoes, taking week-long trips in northern Canada. In 2001, he was awarded an honorary Doctor of Laws degree from the State University of New York at Potsdam. He is an honorary member of the Royal Military College of Canada, and an Honorary Patron of Choirs Ontario.

Milliken has long been active in political matters, having served as president of the Frontenac Addington Provincial Liberal Association Kingston in the 1980s. He subscribed to the Canadian House of Commons Hansard at age sixteen, and once wrote a thesis paper on Question Period. Unlike most MPs, he was already well-versed in parliamentary procedure at the time of his first election.

== Member of Parliament ==
Milliken won the Kingston and the Islands Liberal nomination in 1988 over local alderman Alex Lampropoulos, and defeated well-known Progressive Conservative cabinet minister Flora MacDonald by 2,712 votes in the 1988 general election. The Progressive Conservatives won the election with a majority government, and in early 1989 Milliken was named as the Liberal Party's critic for electoral reform, associate critic for senior citizens, and whip for eastern and northern Ontario. Shortly thereafter, he was named to the parliamentary standing committee on elections, privileges, procedures and private members' business. He supported Jean Chrétien for the federal Liberal leadership in 1990.

He was easily re-elected in the 1993 election, as the Liberal Party won a majority government, and was named to a two-year term as parliamentary secretary to the Government House Leader in December 1993. He also became chair of the Commons Procedure and House Affairs Committee. Milliken was a leading candidate for Speaker of the House in January 1994, but lost to Gilbert Parent.

Milliken supported fellow Kingstonian John Gerretsen for the leadership of the Ontario Liberal Party in 1996, and moved to the camp of the eventual winner, Dalton McGuinty, after Gerretsen was eliminated on the second ballot. In the same year, Milliken and fellow Liberal MP John Godfrey introduced the Godfrey-Milliken Bill as a satirical response to the American Helms-Burton Act. The Bill, which would have allowed the descendants of United Empire Loyalists to claim compensation for land seized in the American Revolution, was drafted in response to provisions in the Helms-Burton Act which sought to punish Canadian companies for using land nationalised by Fidel Castro's government in Cuba. Godfrey and Milliken gave a twenty-minute presentation on their bill in Washington, D.C. in early 1997, and were greeted with warm applause from local Helms-Burton opponents.

Milliken was re-elected for a third term in 1997 election, and became Deputy Speaker of the House for the parliament that followed.

== Speaker of the House ==
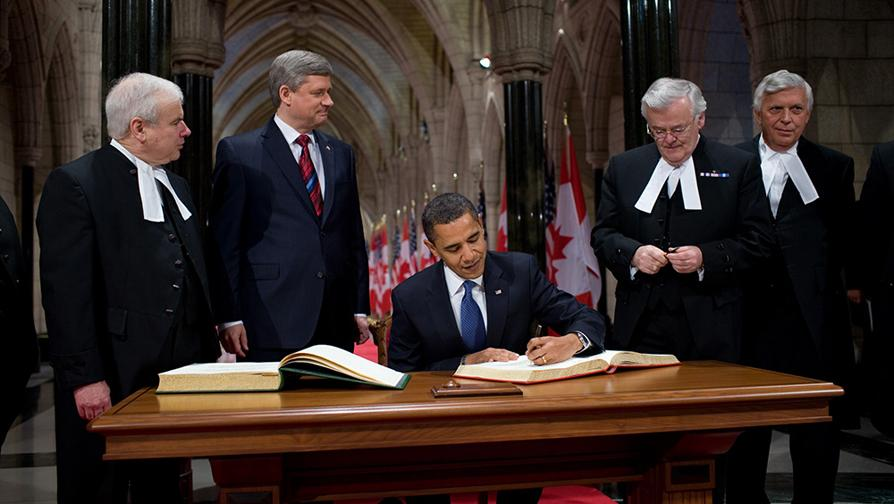
Milliken (left) along with Prime Minister Stephen Harper as US President Barack Obama signs the Parliament guest book on February 19, 2009

Milliken was elected Speaker of the House in late January 2001, after five ballots of a secret vote of all MPs held at the first sitting of parliament following the 2000 federal election. He was widely praised by government and opposition MPs for his rulings, which were considered very fair. He also brought new life to the chair in delivering his rulings and remarks with witty humour. Elected for his fifth term in 2004, he was the unanimous choice of MPs to be re-elected Speaker for the next parliament.

In 2005, Milliken prevented an early federal election by breaking a tie vote on the second reading of Bill C-48, an amendment to the 2005 federal budget, which was a confidence motion. The vote was 152 in favour and 152 against prior to his vote, and he voted in favour of the bill. The Speaker does not vote except in the case of a tie, and must vote, by precedent, in such a way as to keep the matter open for further consideration if possible (i.e. passing C-48 to allow further debate for a third reading). This was the first time in Canadian history that a Speaker used his tie-breaker vote on a confidence motion. Upon rising to give brief remarks and cast his vote, he remarked "I don't know why honourable members keep doing this to me."

Milliken won his riding for a sixth time in the 2006 election, as the Conservative Party won a minority government nationally. Though his party was no longer in government, he was re-elected Speaker of the House for the 39th Parliament on April 3, 2006, defeating fellow Liberals Diane Marleau and Marcel Proulx on the first ballot. With his re-election, he became only the second Speaker chosen from an opposition party in the history of the House of Commons (James Jerome, Liberal Member of Parliament for the Sudbury riding during the Joe Clark government, being the other).

In February 2007, Milliken rejected the Conservative government's challenge of an opposition bill that commits the government to implement the Kyoto Accord. The government argued that the bill introduced new spending, and could not be introduced by someone who was not a minister. Milliken ruled that the bill did not specifically commit the government to any new spending, and was therefore in order. The bill was approved by the house, despite government opposition.

Milliken was re-elected for a seventh term in the 2008 federal election, which again yielded a Conservative minority government. On November 18, after five ballots, he was elected for the fourth time as Speaker. On October 12, 2009, he became the longest serving Canadian House of Commons speaker in history.

The Speaker only votes in order to break a tie. Speakers of the House of Commons have only needed to vote eleven times in Canadian parliamentary history – he cast five of the ten votes since Confederation.

On March 18, 2010, the three opposition parties asked Milliken to make a pivotal ruling on a question of privilege (specifically the power to send for persons, papers and records), in regards to Parliament's request for documents on the transfer of Afghan detainees, a notable issue in 2009 and 2010. On April 27, 2010, Milliken ruled that Parliament had a right to ask for uncensored documents. He asked that all House leaders, ministers and MPs to come to a collective solution by May 11, 2010 "without compromising the security and confidentiality contained.".

On March 9, 2011, Milliken made two historic rulings finding a prima facie case of contempt of Parliament against the government of Stephen Harper, referring the matter to the Procedure Committee. The House subsequently voted to "agree with the finding of the Standing Committee on Procedure and House Affairs that the government is in contempt of Parliament" in supporting a non-confidence vote on March 25, 2011. Prior to the vote, the last House of Commons which Milliken would preside over, the Speaker was praised by MPs from all sides of the House. Conservative Government House Leader John Baird paid homage to Milliken's career, recalling a meeting he'd had with the Speaker of the House of Commons of the United Kingdom. "The Speaker of the Commons there said that he and Speakers from all around the Commonwealth look to you as their leader and their inspiration as someone who has conducted himself very professionally. For a Canadian to hear that from a British Speaker is a pretty remarkable conclusion and assessment of your role as Speaker." Baird predicted that Milliken would "go down in history as, if not one of the best Speakers, the best Speaker the House of Commons has ever had."

His is also known to be the first person to start the tradition of the Speaker releasing an official Scotch whisky.

Opposition Leader Michael Ignatieff said of Milliken, "You have taught us all – sometimes with modest rebuke, sometimes with stern force of argument – to understand, to respect and to cherish the rules of Canadian democracy, and for that alone all Canadians will be grateful to you."

== Post-Commons career ==
On June 18, 2011, Milliken chaired the Liberal Party of Canada constitutional convention which was held by conference call in order to decide whether or not to amend the party's constitution in order to allow the party's leadership convention to be delayed until 2013.

Later that month, Milliken joined Queen's University as a Fellow at the School of Policy Studies where he teaches and conducts research. He has also returned to the firm of Cunningham Swan Carty Little & Bonham LLP as Senior Advisor. Milliken also now serves as an elected member of the Governing Board of The University Club at Queen's University in Kingston.

On May 9, 2012, Milliken's official portrait was unveiled on Parliament Hill, and was hung in the Speaker's Corridor of the Centre Block. The portrait was painted by American-Canadian artist Paul Wyse.

== Honours ==
- Peter Milliken was appointed to the Queen's Privy Council for Canada on May 8, 2012, giving him the accordant style of The Honourable and the post-nominal letters "PC" for life.
- On December 26, 2014, Peter Milliken was appointed as an Officer of the Order of Canada giving him the post-nominal letters "OC" for Life.
- In 2014 he was elected as a Fellow of the Royal Society of Canada, giving him the post-nominal letters "FRSC" for Life.
- The October 27, 2012 edition of the Canada Gazette states that Milliken received the Grand Cross 1st Class of the Order of Merit of the Federal Republic of Germany.

Decorations

- Peter Milliken was awarded the 125th Anniversary of the Confederation of Canada Medal in 1992 as a sitting MP along with the Canadian version of the Queen Elizabeth II Golden Jubilee Medal in 2002 and the Canadian version of the Queen Elizabeth II Diamond Jubilee Medal in 2012

Ribbon bars of Peter Milliken

Honorary Degrees

| Location | Date | School | Degree |
|---|---|---|---|
| New York | May 2001 | State University of New York at Potsdam | Doctor of Laws (LL.D) |
| Ontario | 2005 | St. Lawrence College | Honorary Diploma |
| Ontario | May 2012 | Queen's University | Doctor of Laws (LL.D) |
| Quebec | June 4, 2012 | McGill University | Doctor of Laws (LL.D) |
| British Columbia | June 2013 | University of Victoria | Doctor of Laws (LL.D) |
| Ontario | November 22, 2013 | Royal Military College of Canada | Doctor of Laws (LL.D) |
| Ontario | June 22, 2015 | Law Society of Upper Canada | Doctor of Laws (LL.D) |

== Electoral record ==
2008 Canadian federal election: Kingston and the Islands
| Party | Candidate | Votes | % | ±% | Expenditures |
|---|---|---|---|---|---|
| Liberal | Peter Milliken | 22,734 | 39.15 | −6.8 | $58,470 |
| Conservative | Brian Abrams | 18,895 | 32.54 | +6.5 | $89,566 |
| New Democratic | Rick Downes | 10,158 | 17.49 | −1.7 | $31,946 |
| Green | Eric Walton | 6,282 | 10.82 | +2.8 | $28,227 |
| Total valid votes/expense limit | | 58,069 | 100.00 | | $94,357 |
| Total rejected ballots | | 205 | 0.35 | | |
| Turnout | | 58,274 | 62.0 | | |

2006 Canadian federal election: Kingston and the Islands
| Party | Candidate | Votes | % | ±% | Expenditures |
|---|---|---|---|---|---|
| Liberal | Peter Milliken | 28,548 | 45.9 | −6.5 | $51,251 |
| Conservative | Lou Grimshaw | 16,230 | 26.1 | +3.0 | $60,915 |
| New Democratic | Rob Hutchison | 11,946 | 19.2 | +2.8 | $28,094 |
| Green | Eric Walton | 5,006 | 8.0 | +1.9 | $18,532 |
| Independent | Karl Eric Walker | 296 | 0.5 | +0.1 | $0 |
| Canadian Action | Don Rogers | 222 | 0.4 | 0.0 | $6,360 |
| Total valid votes/expense limit | | 62,248 | 100.0 | | |
| Total rejected ballots | | 240 | | | |
| Turnout | | 62,488 | 65.97 | | |
| Electors on the lists | | 94,720 | | | |
Sources: Official Results, Elections Canada and Financial Returns, Elections Canada.

2004 Canadian federal election: Kingston and the Islands
| Party | Candidate | Votes | % | ±% | Expenditures |
|---|---|---|---|---|---|
| Liberal | Peter Milliken | 28,544 | 52.3 | +0.6 | $45,543.70 |
| Conservative | Blair MacLean | 12,582 | 23.1 | −10.4 | $83,209.34 |
| New Democratic | Rob Hutchison | 8,964 | 16.4 | +6.8 | $18,440.27 |
| Green | Janina Fisher Balfour | 3,339 | 6.1 | +0.9 | $14,087.39 |
| Christian Heritage | Terry Marshall | 481 | 0.9 | – | $1,652.04 |
| Independent | Rosie the Clown Elston | 237 | 0.4 | – | $134.54 |
| Canadian Action | Don Rogers | 179 | 0.3 | – | $6,285.00 |
| Independent | Karl Eric Walker | 100 | 0.4 | – | $670.21 |
| Total valid votes | | 54,563 | 100.00 | | |
| Total rejected ballots | | 175 | | | |
| Turnout | | 54,601 | 60.32 | | |
| Electors on the lists | | 90,523 | | | |
Percentage change figures are factored for redistribution. Conservative Party percentages are contrasted with the combined Canadian Alliance and Progressive Conservative percentages from the 2000 election.
Sources: Official Results, Elections Canada and Financial Returns, Elections Canada.

2000 Canadian federal election: Kingston and the Islands
| Party | Candidate | Votes | % | ±% | Expenditures |
|---|---|---|---|---|---|
| Liberal | Peter Milliken | 26,457 | 51.7 | +2.2 | $38,161.64 |
| Progressive Conservative | Blair MacLean | 9,222 | 18.0 | −3.8 | $58,975.69 |
| Alliance | Kevin Goligher | 7,904 | 15.4 | +2.4 | $28,534.05 |
| New Democratic | Gary Wilson | 4,951 | 9.7 | −2.8 | $27,262.77 |
| Green | Chris Milburn | 2,652 | 5.2 | +3.4 | $4,200.19 |
| Total valid votes | | 51,186 | 100.0 | | |
| Total rejected ballots | | 203 | | | |
| Turnout | | 51,389 | 58.53 | | |
| Electors on the lists | | 87,793 | | | |
Note: Canadian Alliance vote is compared to the Reform vote in 1997 election.
Sources: Official Results, Elections Canada and Financial Returns, Elections Canada.

1997 Canadian federal election: Kingston and the Islands
| Party | Candidate | Votes | % | ±% | |
|---|---|---|---|---|---|
| Liberal | Peter Milliken | 25,632 | 49.5 | −7.2 | $39,224 |
| Progressive Conservative | Helen Cooper | 11,296 | 21.8 | +3.0 | $44,719 |
| Reform | Dave Clarke | 6,761 | 13.1 | +0.5 | $33,384 |
| New Democratic | Gary Wilson | 6,433 | 12.4 | +5.5 | $28,694 |
| Green | Chris Walker | 902 | 1.7 | – | $1,748 |
| Christian Heritage | Terry Marshall | 751 | 1.5 | +0.2 | $127 |
| Total valid votes | | 51,775 | 100.0 | | |
| Total rejected ballots | | 239 | | | |
| Turnout | | 52,014 | 62.77 | | |
| Electors on the lists | | 82,869 | | | |
Sources: Official Results, Elections Canada and Financial Returns, Elections Canada.

1993 Canadian federal election: Kingston and the Islands
| Party | Candidate | Votes | % | Expenditures |
|---|---|---|---|---|
| Liberal | Peter Milliken | 32,372 | 56.46 | $45,912 |
| Progressive Conservative | Barry Gordon | 10,935 | 19.07 | $54,157 |
| Reform | Sean McAdam | 7,175 | 12.51 | $32,259 |
| New Democratic | Mary Ann Higgs | 4,051 | 7.06 | $22,979 |
| National | Chris Papadopoulos | 1,768 | 3.08 | $8,171 |
| Christian Heritage | Terry Marshall | 663 | 1.16 | $1,442 |
| Natural Law | Chris Wilson | 376 | 0.66 | $0 |
| Total valid votes | | 57,340 | 100.00 | |
| Total rejected ballots | | 369 | | |
| Turnout | | 57,709 | 60.65 | |
| Electors on the lists | | 95,154 | | |
Source: Thirty-fifth General Election, 1993: Official Voting Results, Published by the Chief Electoral Officer of Canada. Financial figures taken from official contributions and expenses provided by Elections Canada.

1988 Canadian federal election: Kingston and the Islands
| Party | Candidate | Votes | % | ±% | |
|---|---|---|---|---|---|
| Liberal | Peter Milliken | 23,121 | 40.6 | +12.9 | $38,348 |
| Progressive Conservative | Flora MacDonald | 20,409 | 35.9 | −19.2 | $46,265 |
| New Democratic | Len Johnson | 11,442 | 20.1 | +7.5 | $47,572 |
| Christian Heritage | Terry Marshall | 1,646 | 2.9 | – | $15,262 |
| Libertarian | John Hayes | 301 | 0.5 | 0.0 | $1,295 |
| Total valid votes | | 56,919 | 100.0 | | |
| Turnout | | 57,188 | 74.26 | | |
| Electors on the lists | | 77,014 | | | |

All electoral information is taken from Elections Canada. Italicized expenditures from elections after 1997 refer to submitted totals, and are presented when the final reviewed totals are not available. Expenditures from 1997 refer to submitted totals.

== Arms ==
Coat of arms of Peter Milliken
| Crest Issuant from a Loyalist military coronet Or a demi lion Gules holding the Mace of the House of Commons of Canada Or; Escutcheon Per fess Argent and Gules a fess wavy per fess wavy Azure and Argent, in chief two demi lions Gules issuant from the fess, in base a garb Or; Supporters Two griffins Or each gorged with a Loyalist military coronet Gules and standing on a grassy mound Vert; Motto JE REGARDE BIEN (French for 'I Look Carefully') Orders Officer of the Order of Canada: Desiderantes meliorem patriam (Latin for 'They desire a better country') |
