= Bryan Paterson =

Canadian politician (born 1977)

96th Mayor of Kingston
- In office December 1, 2014 – November 15, 2026
- Preceded by: Mark Gerretsen
- Succeeded by: Conny Glenn

Personal details
- Born: March 16, 1977 (age 49) Newmarket, Ontario, Canada
- Party: Independent
- Other political affiliations: Conservative (2025)
- Education: University of Western Ontario; Queen's University
- Profession: Politician

Bryan Paterson (born March 16, 1977) is a Canadian politician who served as the 96th mayor of Kingston from 2014 to 2026.

== Career ==
He is an economics professor at the Royal Military College of Canada.

== Mayor ==
Paterson became mayor of Kingston after winning the election on October 27, 2014 with 38.15% of the vote. The first meeting of City Council was on December 2, 2014.

Paterson was re-elected in 2018 with 69% of the vote, then again in the 2022 municipal election with 74% of the vote.

Paterson was defeated in a close election in the 2026 municipal election. He received 41.17% of the vote and lost to Conny Glenn who received 43.25%. He lost by less than 800 votes.

== Federal politics ==
On January 23, 2025, Paterson announced that he was seeking the Conservative nomination for his home riding of Kingston and the Islands in the 2025 federal election. He later won the nomination by acclamation. He was later defeated by his predecessor and incumbent MP Mark Gerretsen.

== Controversy ==
In 2014, Paterson came under scrutiny when two videos of him discussing the "hyper-sexualization" of youth appeared on social media. In the second video, Paterson notes his desire to "raise up an army for God."

In 2020, Paterson was accused of participating in conversion therapy while serving as a youth pastor at the Third Day Worship Centre, a conservative evangelical church. Paterson denied "certain claims" made by his alleged victim as "false and inaccurate."

Paterson distanced himself when videos surfaced of Third Day Worship Centre pastor Francis Armstrong giving sermons in which he made discriminatory remarks about the LGBT community and the Islamic Society of Kingston.

== Personal life ==
Paterson attended Third Day Worship Centre, a church that is non-denominational and evangelical.

== Electoral record ==
2025 Canadian federal election: Kingston and the Islands
Party	Candidate	Votes	%	±%	Expenditures
Liberal	Mark Gerretsen	48,682	63.23	+22.54	$120,473.94
Conservative	Bryan Paterson	23,592	30.64	+6.09	$127,560.23
New Democratic	Daria Juüdi-Hope	3,648	4.74	–24.06	$32,326.52
Green	Fintan Hartnett	1,071	1.39	–1.07	$3,473.55
Total valid votes		76,993	99.44	+0.11	$151,724.40
Total rejected ballots		432	0.56	–0.11	
Turnout		77,425	71.68	+4.77	
Eligible voters		108,014			
Liberal notional hold		Swing		+8.22	
Source: Elections Canada
