= Masters Swimming Canada =

Masters Swimming Canada is a Canadian organization that supports and promotes Masters Swimming nationally, in cooperation with provincial bodies and clubs. Masters Swimming is a club-based organization that maintains a list of all Masters clubs in the country, and oversees structured swimming programs for adults which include competitions in pools or open water. The word "Masters" in Masters Swimming refers to age and not skill level. In Canada, swimmers must be 18 years of age to register as a Masters Swimmer. The slogan of Masters Swimming Canada is "Fun and Friendship, Health and Wellness, Participation and Achievement".

Masters Swimming Canada is registered as a federally incorporated non-profit corporation and is governed by an elected board of directors. Registered Masters clubs are the voting members of the corporation. The board of directors acts as a policy-governance board with an executive director responsible for ongoing operations. It is a member of Swimming Natation Canada Inc., the national governing body for swimming in Canada.

== History ==
Canada's first Masters Swimming club was established in 1971 by Hud Stewart, a professor at Osgoode Hall Law School and a Canadian track and field Olympian who had become interested in adult fitness. Stewart and his friend Al Waites had entered the second US Masters National Championship in Amarillo on May 7 and May 8, 1971, alongside 106 US swimmers. On his return to Toronto, Stewart established Canada's first Masters Club, "The University of Toronto Masters", swimming at Hart House and consisting primarily of university staff, as well as some older students who were not on the University swim teams.

== Programs ==
=== Competition ===
Masters Swimming Canada oversees competition programs for Masters Swimming, including short and long course pool competition as well as open water events, maintaining a calendar of all sanctioned competitions, a database of competitive results, the national rankings, and the Canadian national Masters records. The organization also, through Swimming Canada, maintains the Canadian Masters Swimming Rule Book, which governs all Masters swimming competitions in Canada.

Masters Swimming Canada organizes the annual Canadian Masters Swimming Championships. A bidding process is conducted each year for the selection of a local organizing committee.

=== Million Metre Challenge ===
The Million Metre Challenge is a Masters Swimming Canada program that allows swimmers to track their training by recording the number of metres swum in each workout online. As swimmers reach various milestone distances they receive recognition and awards. The program also has components involving total metres swum by clubs and virtual swims where individual and club metres achieved are plotted on maps. Swimmers can log distances by strokes, kicking, and drills, or by total metres, and can record further specifics or notes.

Like so much of master swimming in Canada, the history of tracking workouts has it roots in Ontario. A summary of that history is published on the Masters Swimming Ontario website.

== Sources ==
- Whitehall, Beth; (formerly Executive Secretary of Masters Swimming Canada), Notes
