= Central Gilts Office =

The Central Gilts Office (CGO) was a UK financial settlement organisation that operated between 1986 and 1999. It was established in 1986 by the Bank of England and the London Stock Exchange for the settlement of gilts and certain non-British government debt instruments. It was operated by the Bank of England. The system was upgraded to CREST software in 1997. Ownership and responsibility for the CGO service was transferred from the Bank of England to CRESTCo on 24 May 1999. However, the Bank of England continued to operate and support CGO on CRESTCo's behalf until the migration of gilts activity into CREST was complete, and settlement of gilts migrated from the Bank of England to CRESTCo at the start of July 2000.
