= Kingston and the Islands (federal electoral district) =

Federal electoral district in Ontario, Canada

Coordinates: 44.23°N 76.48°W

Ontario electoral district
- Interactive map of riding boundaries from the 2025 federal election

Federal electoral district
- Legislature: House of Commons
MP
Mark Gerretsen
Liberal
- District created: 1966
- First contested: 1968
- Last contested: 2025
- District webpage: profile, map

Demographics
- Population (2011): 116,996
- Electors (2015): 87,460
- Area (km²): 434
- Pop. density (per km²): 269.6
- Census division: Frontenac
- Census subdivision(s): Kingston, Frontenac Islands

Kingston and the Islands (French: Kingston et les Îles) is a federal electoral district in Ontario, Canada, that has been represented in the House of Commons of Canada since 1968.

It covers part of the city of Kingston, Ontario and the sparsely populated Frontenac Islands in the St. Lawrence River.

It has been represented since the 2015 federal election by Liberal Mark Gerretsen.

== Demographics ==
According to the 2021 Canadian census

- Ethnic groups: 80.1% White, 6.0% Indigenous, 3.6% South Asian, 2.5% Chinese, 2.1% Black, 1.3% Arab, 1.0% Latin American
- Languages: 84.7% English, 4.1% French, 1.3% Mandarin, 1.1% Portuguese, 1.0% Arabic
- Religions: 50.5% Christian (23.8% Catholic, 6.6% Anglican, 6.4% United Church, 1.3% Presbyterian, 1.0% Baptist, 11.4% other), 2.7% Muslim, 1.4% Hindu, 42.9% none
- Median income: $41,600 (2020)
- Average income: $54,100 (2020)

=== 2023 representation ===
According to the 2021 Canadian census

Languages: 85.2% English, 4.1% French, 1.2% Mandarin, 1.1% Portuguese
Race: 82.6% White, 4.2% Indigenous, 3.4% South Asian, 2.4% Chinese, 2.0% Black, 1.2% Arab
Religions: 51.0% Christian (23.8% Catholic, 6.7% Anglican, 6.7% United Church, 1.4% Presbyterian, 12.5% other), 2.6% Muslim, 1.3% Hindu, 42.7% none
Median income: $41,600 (2020)
Average income: $54,250 (2020)

== History ==
The riding was created in 1966 from Kingston and parts of Hastings—Frontenac—Lennox and Addington and Prince Edward—Lennox.

In 1966, it was defined to consist of the City of Kingston, the Townships of Howe Island, Kingston and Wolfe Island, and the southwest part of the Township of Pittsburg, in Frontenac County; and the Township of Amherst Island in Lennox and Addington County.

In 1996, the Township of Pittsburgh portion of the riding was redefined to consist of the part of the township lying to the south of Highway 401.

In 2003, it was redefined to consist of the Township of Frontenac Islands (a 1998 merger of the Townships of Howe Island and Wolfe Island) and the City of Kingston (into which the Townships of Pittsburgh and Kingston had both been merged in 1998).

In 2013, the riding's borders were adjusted to remove the area north of Highway 401 from the riding, which became part of a new district, Lanark—Frontenac—Kingston and came into effect for the 2015 federal election.

Following the 2022 Canadian federal electoral redistribution, which came into effect for the 2025 Canadian federal election, the boundaries were restored to the 2003 boundaries, which include all of the Township of Frontenac Islands and the City of Kingston.

== Members of Parliament ==
This riding has elected the following members of Parliament:

Parliament	Years	Member	Party
Kingston and the Islands; Riding created from Kingston, and Prince Edward—Lennox
28th	1968–1972	Edgar Benson	Liberal
29th	1972–1974	Flora MacDonald	Progressive Conservative
30th	1974–1979	Flora MacDonald	Progressive Conservative
31st	1979–1980	Flora MacDonald	Progressive Conservative
32nd	1980–1984	Flora MacDonald	Progressive Conservative
33rd	1984–1988	Flora MacDonald	Progressive Conservative
34th	1988–1993	Peter Milliken	Liberal
35th	1993–1997	Peter Milliken	Liberal
36th	1997–2000	Peter Milliken	Liberal
37th	2000–2004	Peter Milliken	Liberal
38th	2004–2006	Peter Milliken	Liberal
39th	2006–2008	Peter Milliken	Liberal
40th	2008–2011	Peter Milliken	Liberal
41st	2011–2015	Ted Hsu	Liberal
42nd	2015–2019	Mark Gerretsen	Liberal
43rd	2019–2021	Mark Gerretsen	Liberal
44th	2021–2025	Mark Gerretsen	Liberal
45th	2025–present	Mark Gerretsen	Liberal

== Election results ==
Graph of election results in Kingston and the Islands (minor parties that never got 2% of the vote or didn't run consistently are omitted)

2025 Canadian federal election
Party	Candidate	Votes	%	±%	Expenditures
Liberal	Mark Gerretsen	48,682	63.23	+22.54	$120,473.94
Conservative	Bryan Paterson	23,592	30.64	+6.09	$127,560.23
New Democratic	Daria Juüdi-Hope	3,648	4.74	–24.06	$32,326.52
Green	Fintan Hartnett	1,071	1.39	–1.07	$3,473.55
Total valid votes		76,993	99.44	+0.11	$151,724.40
Total rejected ballots		432	0.56	–0.11	
Turnout		77,425	71.68	+4.77	
Eligible voters		108,014			
Liberal notional hold		Swing		+8.22	
Source: Elections Canada

2021 federal election redistributed results
Party	Vote	%
Liberal	29,171	40.69
New Democratic	20,647	28.80
Conservative	17,599	24.55
People's	2,499	3.49
Green	1,761	2.46
Rhinoceros	10	0.01
Total valid votes	71,687	99.34
Rejected ballots	479	0.66
Registered voters/ estimated turnout	107,856	66.91

2021 Canadian federal election
Party	Candidate	Votes	%	±%	Expenditures
Liberal	Mark Gerretsen	27,724	41.07	-4.69	$112,202.25
New Democratic	Vic Sahai	19,775	29.29	+6.04	$62,595.17
Conservative	Gary Oosterhof	16,019	23.73	+4.22	$81,382.35
People's	Shelley Sayle-Udall	2,314	3.43	+0.83	$4,795.67
Green	Waji Khan	1,673	2.48	-6.41	$12,283.32
Total valid votes/expense limit		67,505	99.35	–	$124,484.67
Total rejected ballots		445	0.65	-0.05	
Turnout		67,950	67.01	-2.41	
Eligible voters		101,401			
Liberal hold		Swing		-5.37	
Source(s) "Official Voting Results". Elections Canada.

2019 Canadian federal election
Party	Candidate	Votes	%	±%	Expenditures
Liberal	Mark Gerretsen	31,205	45.8	-9.37	$61,590.05
New Democratic	Barrington Walker	15,856	23.3	+6.39	none listed
Conservative	Ruslan Yakoviychuk	13,304	19.5	-3.5	none listed
Green	Candice Christmas	6,059	8.9	+4.19	none listed
People's	Andy Brooke	1,769	2.6		none listed
Total valid votes/expense limit		68,193	100.0		
Total rejected ballots		484			
Turnout		68,677	70.5		
Eligible voters		97,364			
Liberal hold		Swing		-7.88	
Source: Elections Canada

2015 Canadian federal election
Party	Candidate	Votes	%	±%	Expenditures
Liberal	Mark Gerretsen	36,421	55.37	+15.35	$146,934.43
Conservative	Andy Brooke	14,928	22.70	-11.36	$97,596.78
New Democratic	Daniel Beals	11,185	17.01	-4.61	$44,779.89
Green	Nathan Townend	2,933	4.46	+0.15	$7,750.70
Libertarian	Luke McAllister	305	0.46	–	–
Total valid votes/expense limit		65,772	100.00		$230,365.62
Total rejected ballots		242	0.37	–	
Turnout		66,014	73.36	–	
Eligible voters		89,990			
Liberal hold		Swing		+13.36	
Source(s) Elections Canada – Confirmed candidates for Kingston and the Islands, 30 September 2015 Elections Canada – Preliminary Election Expenses Limits for Candidates Archived 2015-08-15 at the Wayback Machine

2011 federal election redistributed results
Party	Vote	%
Liberal	22,666	40.02
Conservative	19,289	34.06
New Democratic	12,243	21.62
Green	2,438	4.30

2011 Canadian federal election
Party	Candidate	Votes	%	±%
Liberal	Ted Hsu	23,842	39.31	+0.16
Conservative	Alicia Gordon	21,189	34.93	+2.39
New Democratic	Daniel Beals	13,065	21.54	+4.05
Green	Eric Walton	2,561	4.22	−6.60
Total valid votes		60,657	100.00	
Total rejected ballots		219	0.36	+0.01
Turnout		60,876	63.90	+1.90
Eligible voters		95,265		

2008 Canadian federal election
Party	Candidate	Votes	%	±%	Expenditures
Liberal	Peter Milliken	22,734	39.15	−6.8	$58,470
Conservative	Brian Abrams	18,895	32.54	+6.5	$89,566
New Democratic	Rick Downes	10,158	17.49	−1.7	$31,946
Green	Eric Walton	6,282	10.82	+2.8	$28,227
Total valid votes/expense limit		58,069	100.00		$94,357
Total rejected ballots		205	0.35		
Turnout		58,274	62.0		

2006 Canadian federal election
Party	Candidate	Votes	%	±%	Expenditures
Liberal	Peter Milliken	28,548	45.9	−6.5	$51,251
Conservative	Lou Grimshaw	16,230	26.1	+3.0	$60,915
New Democratic	Rob Hutchison	11,946	19.2	+2.8	$28,094
Green	Eric Walton	5,006	8.0	+1.9	$18,532
Independent	Karl Eric Walker	296	0.5	+0.1	$0
Canadian Action	Don Rogers	222	0.4	0.0	$6,360
Total valid votes/expense limit		62,248	100.0		
Total rejected ballots		240			
Turnout		62,488	65.97		
Electors on the lists		94,720			
Sources: Official Results, Elections Canada and Financial Returns, Elections Canada.

2004 Canadian federal election
Party	Candidate	Votes	%	±%	Expenditures
Liberal	Peter Milliken	28,544	52.3	+0.6	$45,543.70
Conservative	Blair MacLean	12,582	23.1	−10.4	$83,209.34
New Democratic	Rob Hutchison	8,964	16.4	+6.8	$18,440.27
Green	Janina Fisher Balfour	3,339	6.1	+0.9	$14,087.39
Christian Heritage	Terry Marshall	481	0.9	–	$1,652.04
Independent	Rosie the Clown Elston	237	0.4	–	$134.54
Canadian Action	Don Rogers	179	0.3	–	$6,285.00
Independent	Karl Eric Walker	100	0.4	–	$670.21
Total valid votes		54,563	100.00		
Total rejected ballots		175			
Turnout		54,601	60.32		
Electors on the lists		90,523			
Percentage change figures are factored for redistribution. Conservative Party percentages are contrasted with the combined Canadian Alliance and Progressive Conservative percentages from the 2000 election.
Sources: Official Results, Elections Canada and Financial Returns, Elections Canada.

2000 Canadian federal election
Party	Candidate	Votes	%	±%	Expenditures
Liberal	Peter Milliken	26,457	51.7	+2.2	$38,161.64
Progressive Conservative	Blair MacLean	9,222	18.0	−3.8	$58,975.69
Alliance	Kevin Goligher	7,904	15.4	+2.4	$28,534.05
New Democratic	Gary Wilson	4,951	9.7	−2.8	$27,262.77
Green	Chris Milburn	2,652	5.2	+3.4	$4,200.19
Total valid votes		51,186	100.0		
Total rejected ballots		203			
Turnout		51,389	58.53		
Electors on the lists		87,793			
Note: Canadian Alliance vote is compared to the Reform vote in 1997 election.
Sources: Official Results, Elections Canada and Financial Returns, Elections Canada.

1997 Canadian federal election
Party	Candidate	Votes	%	±%	
Liberal	Peter Milliken	25,632	49.5	−7.2	$39,224
Progressive Conservative	Helen Cooper	11,296	21.8	+3.0	$44,719
Reform	Dave Clarke	6,761	13.1	+0.5	$33,384
New Democratic	Gary Wilson	6,433	12.4	+5.5	$28,694
Green	Chris Walker	902	1.7	–	$1,748
Christian Heritage	Terry Marshall	751	1.5	+0.2	$127
Total valid votes		51,775	100.0		
Total rejected ballots		239			
Turnout		52,014	62.77		
Electors on the lists		82,869			
Sources: Official Results, Elections Canada and Financial Returns, Elections Canada.

1993 Canadian federal election
Party	Candidate	Votes	%	Expenditures
Liberal	Peter Milliken	32,372	56.46	$45,912
Progressive Conservative	Barry Gordon	10,935	19.07	$54,157
Reform	Sean McAdam	7,175	12.51	$32,259
New Democratic	Mary Ann Higgs	4,051	7.06	$22,979
National	Chris Papadopoulos	1,768	3.08	$8,171
Christian Heritage	Terry Marshall	663	1.16	$1,442
Natural Law	Chris Wilson	376	0.66	$0
Total valid votes		57,340	100.00	
Total rejected ballots		369		
Turnout		57,709	60.65	
Electors on the lists		95,154		
Source: Thirty-fifth General Election, 1993: Official Voting Results, Published by the Chief Electoral Officer of Canada. Financial figures taken from official contributions and expenses provided by Elections Canada.

1988 Canadian federal election
Party	Candidate	Votes	%	±%	
Liberal	Peter Milliken	23,121	40.6	+12.9	$38,348
Progressive Conservative	Flora MacDonald	20,409	35.9	−19.2	$46,265
New Democratic	Len Johnson	11,442	20.1	+7.5	$47,572
Christian Heritage	Terry Marshall	1,646	2.9	–	$15,262
Libertarian	John Hayes	301	0.5	0.0	$1,295
Total valid votes		56,919	100.0		
Turnout		57,188	74.26		
Electors on the lists		77,014			

1984 Canadian federal election
Party	Candidate	Votes	%	±%
Progressive Conservative	Flora MacDonald	25,997	55.1	+13.3
Liberal	George Speal	13,087	27.7	-11.5
New Democratic	Andrew Currie	5,950	12.6	-5.4
Independent	Daniel Eardley ("Pro-Life Party")	1,410	3.0	
Green	Ted Bond	478	1.0	
Libertarian	Ian Murray	258	0.5	
Total valid votes		47,180	100.0	

1980 Canadian federal election
Party	Candidate	Votes	%	±%
Progressive Conservative	Flora MacDonald	18,146	41.8	-5.9
Liberal	John Coleman	17,039	39.3	+6.0
New Democratic	Stephen Foster	7,830	18.0	-0.9
Rhinoceros	Edward Sharp	373	0.9	
Total valid votes		43,388	100.0	

1979 Canadian federal election
Party	Candidate	Votes	%	±%
Progressive Conservative	Flora MacDonald	21,277	47.7	+1.5
Liberal	Peter Beeman	14,866	33.3	-2.8
New Democratic	Stephen Foster	8,472	19.0	+1.2
Total valid votes		44,615	100.0	

1974 Canadian federal election
Party	Candidate	Votes	%	±%
Progressive Conservative	Flora MacDonald	17,839	46.2	-7.3
Liberal	Peter Watson	13,943	36.1	+3.1
New Democratic	Lars Thompson	6,870	17.8	+4.2
Total valid votes		38,652	100.0	

1972 Canadian federal election
Party	Candidate	Votes	%	±%
Progressive Conservative	Flora MacDonald	22,824	53.4	+17.3
Liberal	John Hazlett	14,079	33.0	-16.7
New Democratic	Lars Thompson	5,807	13.6	-0.6
Total valid votes		42,710	100.0	

1968 Canadian federal election
Party	Candidate	Votes	%
Liberal	Edgar Benson	16,234	49.7
Progressive Conservative	Boggart Trumpour	11,799	36.1
New Democratic	Brendan McConnell	4,636	14.2
Total valid votes		32,669	100.0

== Student vote results ==
2025 Kingston and the Islands student vote
48.94%	25.00%	15.49%	10.57%
Liberal	Conservative	NDP	Green

== See also ==
- List of Canadian electoral districts
- Historical federal electoral districts of Canada
