= James Sampson (physician) =

James Sampson (1789 – November 9, 1861) was an Irish-born medical doctor, educator and politician in Canada. He served as mayor of Kingston from 1839 to 1840 and in 1844.

He was born in Banbridge, County Down, the son of Reverend William Sampson and Alicia Brush, was educated in Dublin and trained in medicine at Middlesex Hospital. He came to Canada in 1811 as named assistant surgeon for the 85th Regiment of Foot. The following year, he was transferred to the Royal Newfoundland Fencible Infantry, serving during the War of 1812. In 1815, he was transferred to the 104th Regiment of Foot. In May 1817, he was retired on half pay and married Eliza Chipman, the daughter of judge Edward Winslow. Sampson set up practice at Niagara later that year. In 1820, he moved to Kingston. The following year he was named magistrate for the Midland District. From 1841 to 1844, he was consulting surgeon to three governors general: Sydenham, Bagot and Metcalfe. Sampson served as chair of the board of governors for Kingston General Hospital. He was chair of the committee which organized the medical faculty at Queen's College and was president of that faculty from 1854 to 1860. From 1835 to 1861, Sampson served as the first physician for the Kingston Penitentiary. From 1829 to 1849, he was inspector of licenses. He also served as magistrate of the Court of Quarter Sessions and as associate judge of the Court of Oyer and Terminer. Sampson was a member of the Midland District Grammar School Board and of the Kingston Board of Health.

Sampson was commander of the Kingston town guard until the militia was called up during the Upper Canada Rebellion in 1837. He also served as major in the Frontenac militia until 1839. He became mayor of Kingston following the death of mayor Henry Cassaday in 1839. He was reelected in 1840, refused another term in 1841 but was elected again in 1844.

He suffered a serious fall in 1860 and died at home in Kingston the following year after a short illness.
