= George Nicholas Speal =

Canadian lawyer

George Nicholas Speal, QC (1932 – December 27, 2008) was a lawyer and political figure in Ontario, Canada. He served as mayor of Kingston from 1973 to 1976.

He was born in Kingston, the son of Greek immigrants, and was educated at Kingston Collegiate, Queen's University and Osgoode Hall Law School. Speal was called to the Ontario bar in 1958. In 1974, he was named Queen's Counsel. During his term as mayor, the Portsmouth Olympic Harbour was redeveloped to host sailing events for the 1976 Summer Olympics in Montreal and the annual tradition of the Mayor's Levee at Kingston City Hall on New Year's Day was established. He ran unsuccessfully for the Kingston and the Islands seat in the Canadian House of Commons as a Liberal in 1984, losing to Flora MacDonald.

He died at home in Kingston in 2008.
