= John Carver (board policy) =

American academic

John Carver was an author noted for his development of the policy model for boards of directors called Policy Governance. Carver says his model is the only systematic theory of boards. He was an adjunct professor of nonprofit organizations in the Institute for Nonprofit Organizations at the University of Georgia School of Social Work. Carver died in August 2024, age 86.

== Development of model ==
Early in his career, Carver searched for a reliable guide to managing the work of a board. His research turned up little on the proper role of the board of directors.

Carver noticed that board members often wonder what the board's job is and where the line lies that distinguishes the board's job from that of the chief executive officer. Carver's model clarifies the separation by having the board explicitly state the board's and CEO's jobs in a set of written policies (hence the name Policy Governance). This set of policies is divided into four types. One is the organization's goals (or Ends), and three are about the means the board and CEO employ to attain those ends.

It is a common misunderstanding that in Policy Governance the board's job is to decide the goals and the chief executive officer's job to determine the means to achieve the board's ends. Both board and CEO decide goals (Ends) and means, but the board's written policies explicitly state where the CEO's room for interpretation of the boards' Ends statements begins.

Carver developed the Policy Governance model and registered its trademark. He permits others to employ the term but he stops any efforts to redefine the term or to ignore its methods and systems. Each application of the Policy Governance model is specific to the organization being governed. The Policy Governance model has universal meaning, and can be adopted in very different company settings, profit and nonprofit, although complex local legislation can make it difficult to recognize the underlying logic of the model. In every true application of Policy Governance, the board represents the ownership of the organization as it defines the good that the organization is to provide for the recipients and at what cost. Ownership and recipients can be the same group of people (as is the case with most associations), but more often they are different groups.

Dr. John Carver and his wife, Miriam Carver, have trained several hundred consultants at his Policy Governance Academy.

== Works ==
Carver has written several books, including Boards That Make a Difference, probably the best known of his works. His book Reinventing Your Board, published in a new edition in 2006, is probably the easiest for a beginner to understand. It contains model board policies that can be modified to fit a range of organizations.
