= Archibald Livingstone =

Archibald Livingstone (August 10, 1827 – October 10, 1890) was a merchant and politician in Ontario, Canada. He served as mayor of Kingston in 1871. His surname also appears as Livingston in some sources.

The son of Duncan Livingstone and Christina McPherson, both natives of Scotland and was born in Montreal. At the age of 14, he began work as a store clerk in Montreal. In 1846, he moved to Kingston, where he worked as a clerk for John Mowat. Livingstone later bought the store, going into business on his own. He served on Kingston council for about twelve years. He also served as president of the local Board of Trade. In 1854, Livingstone married Selina Scobell.

He died in Kingston at the age of 63.
