= Chief governance officer =

Job title

The chief governance officer (CGO) is normally a senior vice executive reporting to the CEO; however, in the not-for-profit sector, when an organization uses policy governance, the chair of the board often takes on the role of CGO, who is tasked with directing the people, business processes and systems needed to enable good governance from inside the corporation in support of the board of directors. In some geographies the role is assumed by the chief counsel, in others by a corporate or company secretary.

The role is likely to grow in prominence as corporate governance requirements - in voluntary codes or law - grow and mature. The heads of several governance-related functions may report to the CGO, including community relations / public affairs, corporate strategy, business continuity management, business performance management, compliance management / internal controls, corporate communication, corporate philanthropy, enterprise risk management, ethics management, internal audit, investor relations, legal services, stakeholder management and sustainability management. Also, the appointment of a CGO with clout is both a signal to the market that the company takes corporate governance seriously and a way to increase the market value of a firm if, as research by McKinsey shows, investors will pay a premium for the stock of well-governed companies.

As corporations add the necessary functions, several issues arise. First is the risk that the functions overlap, evolve into silos, create misunderstanding internally and externally and act at cross purposes. Second is the opportunity for enhanced impact through synergy between these functions. Risk managers, compliance officers and business performance managers often need to manage change in order to achieve their objectives. Without a sponsor at top management level their efforts may fail when the magnitude of resistance to change overwhelms their limited powers of influence. Third, the serial introduction of new processes may simply require more attention, time and enthusiasm than line managers can realistically offer. A single phased plan for enabling good governance could mitigate the risks and preempt any wasteful expenditure. Last, the complexity of the interactions between the different functions compounded by the infancy of the new disciplines may require continuous conceptual interpretation for top management and the board.

Companies that have appointed CGOs include Allianz, Kodak, Krispy Kreme, Prudential, Telkom, and Vodacom.
