= Edward John Barker Pense =

Canadian politician

Ontario MPP
- In office 1901–1908
- Preceded by: William Harty
- Succeeded by: William Folger Nickle
- Constituency: Kingston

Personal details
- Born: June 3, 1848 Kingston, Canada West
- Died: May 7, 1910 (aged 61) Kingston, Ontario
- Party: Liberal
- Spouse: Cornelia Vaughan (m. 1876)

Edward John Barker Pense (June 3, 1848 – May 7, 1910) was a newspaper editor and owner and a politician in Ontario, Canada. He represented Kingston in the Legislative Assembly of Ontario from 1901 to 1908 as a Liberal. Pense was mayor of Kingston in 1881.

He was born in Kingston, the son of Michael Lorenzo Pense, a printer and one-time owner of the Kingston Argus, and Harriet Grace Barker, the daughter of Edward John Barker, owner of the British Whig. He began working for the British Whig in 1862 and became the newspaper's owner in 1872. He represented Frontenac ward on Kingston city council for five years before becoming mayor. Pense served five years on the Kingston Public School Board, including two years as chair. In 1876, he married Cornelia Vaughan. From 1881 to 1882, Pense was president of the Canadian Press Association. He also served on the board of governors for the Kingston General Hospital and was a trustee of the Kingston Collegiate Institute. Pense was first elected to the Ontario assembly in a 1901 by-election held after William Harty resigned to run for a seat in the Canadian House of Commons. He was defeated when he ran for reelection in 1908, losing to William Folger Nickle.

Pense died suddenly at home at the age of 61.

The town of Pense, Saskatchewan was named in his honour.
