= 8th Parliament of Ontario =

The 8th Legislative Assembly of Ontario was in session from June 26, 1894, until January 28, 1898, just prior to the 1898 general election. The majority party was the Ontario Liberal Party led by Oliver Mowat. Arthur Sturgis Hardy succeeded Mowat as Premier in 1896 after Mowat entered federal politics. The Assembly also had significant groupings from the Patrons of Industry (representing farmers' interests) and the Protestant Protective Association (representing anti-Catholic sentiment, and associated with the Orange Order), each of which returned candidates either on their own or with local Liberal or Conservative support.

William Douglas Balfour served as Speaker for the assembly until he was named to cabinet on July 14, 1896. Alfred Évanturel succeeded him as Speaker.

== Members of the Assembly ==
Riding	Member	Party	First elected / previously elected	No. of terms
Addington	James Reid	Conservative	1890	2nd term
Algoma East	Charles Franklin Farwell	Liberal	1894	1st term
Algoma West	James M. Savage (Note: unseated after an appeal)	Conservative	1894	1st term
Algoma West	James Conmee (1895)	Liberal	1885, 1895	4th term*
Brant	William Bruce Wood (Note: retired due to poor health)	Liberal	1886	3rd term
Brant	Daniel Burt (1895)	Liberal	1895	1st term
Brant South	Arthur Sturgis Hardy	Liberal	1873	7th term
Brockville	George Augustus Dana	Liberal	1894	1st term
Bruce Centre	John Stevenson McDonald	Liberal-Patrons of Industry	1894	1st term
Bruce North	Daniel McNaughton	Liberal-Protestant Protective	1893	2nd term
Bruce South	Reuben Eldridge Truax	Liberal	1894	1st term
Cardwell	Edward Alfred Little	Conservative-Protestant Protective	1894	1st term
Carleton	George Nelson Kidd	Conservative-Patrons of Industry	1894	1st term
Dufferin	William Dynes	Patrons of Industry	1894	1st term
Dundas	James Pliny Whitney	Conservative	1888	3rd term
Durham East	William Armstrong Fallis	Conservative	1894	1st term
Durham West	William Henry Reid	Conservative-Protestant Protective	1894	1st term
Elgin East	Charles Andrew Brower	Conservative	1894	1st term
Elgin West	Donald Macnish	Liberal-Patrons of Industry	1894	1st term
Essex North	William J. McKee	Liberal	1894	1st term
Essex South	William Douglas Balfour (Note: died in 1896)	Liberal	1882	5th term
Essex South	John Allan Auld (1896)	Liberal	1896	1st term
Frontenac	Joseph Longford Haycock	Liberal-Patrons of Industry	1894	1st term
Glengarry	David Murdoch McPherson	Liberal-Patrons of Industry	1894	1st term
Grenville	Orlando Bush	Conservative	1890	2nd term
Grey Centre	Thomas Gamey	Protestant Protective	1894	1st term
Grey North	James Cleland	Liberal	1890	2nd term
Grey South	David McNicol	Patrons of Industry	1894	1st term
Haldimand	John Senn	Conservative	1894	1st term
Haldimand	Jacob Baxter (1895)	Liberal	1867, 1895	8th term*
Halton	William Kerns	Conservative	1883	4th term
Hamilton East	James Taylor Middleton	Liberal	1894	1st term
Hamilton West	John Morison Gibson	Liberal	1879, 1891	5th term*
Hastings East	Alexander McLaren	Liberal-Patrons of Industry	1894	1st term
Hastings North	James Haggerty	Patrons of Industry	1894	1st term
Hastings West	William Hodgins Biggar	Liberal	1890	2nd term
Huron East	Thomas Gibson	Liberal	1871	7th term
Huron South	Murdo Young McLean	Liberal	1894	1st term
Huron West	James Thompson Garrow	Liberal	1890	2nd term
Kent East	Robert Ferguson	Liberal	1885	4th term
Kent West	Thomas Letson Pardo	Liberal-Patrons of Industry	1894	1st term
Kingston	Edward H. Smythe	Conservative	1894	1st term
Kingston	William Harty (1895)	Liberal	1895	1st term
Lambton East	Peter Duncan McCallum	Independent	1893	2nd term
Lambton West	Alfred Thomas Gurd	Conservative-Protestant Protective	1894	1st term
Lanark North	Richard Franklin Preston	Conservative	1894	1st term
Lanark South	Arthur James Matheson	Conservative	1894	1st term
Leeds	Walter Beatty	Conservative	1894	1st term
Lennox	Walter William Meacham	Conservative	1886	3rd term
Lincoln	James Hiscott	Conservative	1890	2nd term
London	William Ralph Meredith (Note: appointed judge)	Conservative	1872	7th term
London	Thomas Saunders Hobbs (1894)	Liberal	1894	1st term
Middlesex East	William Shore	Liberal-Protestant Protective	1894	1st term
Middlesex North	William Henry Taylor	Liberal-Patrons of Industry	1894	1st term
Middlesex West	George William Ross	Liberal	1883	4th term
Monck	Richard Harcourt	Liberal	1879	5th term
Muskoka	George Edward Langford	Conservative-Protestant Protective	1894	1st term
Nipissing	John Loughrin	Liberal	1890	2nd term
Norfolk North	Edwin Clarendon Carpenter	Liberal	1891	2nd term
Norfolk South	William Andrew Charlton	Liberal	1890	2nd term
Northumberland East	William Arnson Willoughby	Conservative	1886, 1888	4th term*
Northumberland West	Corelli Collard Field	Liberal	1886	3rd term
Ontario North	Thomas William Chapple	Liberal	1894	1st term
Ontario South	John Dryden	Liberal	1879	5th term
Ottawa (Note: Ottawa had 2 seats)	George O. O'Keefe	Liberal	1894	1st term
Ottawa	Erskine Henry Bronson	Liberal	1886	3rd term
Oxford North	Oliver Mowat (Note: elected to federal seat)	Liberal	1872	7th term
Oxford North	Andrew Pattulo (1896)	Liberal	1896	1st term
Oxford South	Angus McKay	Liberal	1886	3rd term
Parry Sound	William Rabb Beatty	Liberal-Patrons of Industry	1894	1st term
Peel	John Smith	Liberal	1892	2nd term
Perth North	Thomas Magwood	Conservative	1891	2nd term
Perth South	John McNeill	Liberal-Patrons of Industry	1894	1st term
Peterborough East	Thomas Blezard	Liberal	1879	5th term
Peterborough West	James Robert Stratton	Liberal	1886	3rd term
Prescott	Francis Eugene Alfred Evanturel	Liberal	1886	3rd term
Prince Edward	John Caven	Liberal-Patrons of Industry	1894	1st term
Renfrew North	Henry Barr	Liberal	1892	2nd term
Renfrew South	Robert Adam Campbell	Liberal	1894	1st term
Russell	Alexander Robillard	Liberal	1886	3rd term
Simcoe Centre	Robert Paton	Liberal	1890	2nd term
Simcoe East	Andrew Miscampbell	Conservative	1890	2nd term
Simcoe West	Archibald S. Currie	Liberal-Patrons of Industry	1894	1st term
Stormont	John Bennett	Liberal-Patrons of Industry	1894	1st term
Toronto East	George Ryerson	Conservative	1893	2nd term
Toronto North	George Frederick Marter	Conservative	1886	3rd term
Toronto South	Oliver Aiken Howland	Conservative	1894	1st term
Toronto West	Thomas Crawford	Conservative	1894	1st term
Victoria East	John Hilliard Carnegie	Conservative	1894	1st term
Victoria West	John McKay	Liberal-Equal Rights	1890	2nd term
Waterloo North	Alexander Black Robertson	Liberal	1894	1st term
Waterloo South	John Douglas Moore	Liberal	1890	2nd term
Welland	William Manley German	Liberal	1894	1st term
Wellington East	John Craig	Liberal	1894	1st term
Wellington South	John Mutrie	Liberal	1894	1st term
Wellington West	George Tucker	Conservative-Protestant Protective	1894	1st term
Wellington West	James Tucker (1896)	Conservative	1896	1st term
Wentworth North	John Ira Flatt	Liberal	1894	1st term
Wentworth South	Nicholas Awrey (Note: appointed to office)	Liberal	1879	5th term
Wentworth South	John Dickenson (1896)	Liberal	1896	1st term
York East	John Richardson	Liberal	1894	1st term
York North	Elihu James Davis	Liberal	1888	3rd term
York West	Joseph Wesley St. John	Conservative	1894	1st term

== Timeline ==
8th Legislative Assembly of Ontario - Movement in seats held (1894-1898)
Party	1894	Gain/(loss) due to					1898
Party	1894	Void election	Resignation as MPP	Death in office	Byelection gain	Byelection hold	1898
Liberal	45	(1)	(3)	(1)	4	5	49
Conservative	23	(3)	(1)		1		20
Liberal-Patrons	12						12
Conservative–P.P.A.	5	(1)					4
Patrons of Industry	3						3
Conservative-Patrons	2						2
Liberal-P.P.A.	2						2
Protestant Protective Association	1						1
Independent-Conservative-PPA	1						1
Total	94	(5)	(4)	(1)	5	5	94

Changes in seats held (1894–1898)
Seat	Before				Change		
Seat	Date	Member	Party	Reason	Date	Member	Party
London	October 25, 1894	William Ralph Meredith	Conservative	Appointed to Bench	November 20, 1894	Thomas Saunders Hobbs	Liberal
Algoma West	December 20, 1894	James M. Savage	Conservative	Election declared void	January 29, 1895	James Conmee	Liberal
Kingston	December 27, 1894	Edward H. Smythe	Conservative	Election declared void	January 28, 1895	William Harty	Liberal
Wellington West	January 29, 1895 (Note: dismissed on appeal, November 29, 1895)	George Tucker	Conservative–P.P.A.	Election declared void	February 1, 1896	James Tucker (Note: brother of George Tucker)	Conservative
Haldimand	February 27, 1895	John Senn	Conservative	Election declared void	March 19, 1895	Jacob Baxter	Liberal
Brant North	April 23, 1895	William Bruce Wood	Liberal	Appointed Registrar of Brant County	May 20, 1895 (Note: returned by acclamation)	Daniel Burt	Liberal
Kingston	September 20, 1895	William Harty	Liberal	Election declared void	October 8, 1895	William Harty	Liberal
Wentworth South	December 26, 1895	Nicholas Awrey	Liberal	Appointed Sheriff of Wentworth County	January 24, 1896	John Dickenson	Liberal
Oxford North	July 14, 1896	Oliver Mowat	Liberal	Appointed to the Senate	September 7, 1896	Andrew Pattulo	Liberal
Essex South	August 19, 1896	William Douglas Balfour	Liberal	Died in office	October 20, 1896	John Allan Auld	Liberal
