= Kingston (provincial electoral district) =

Coordinates: 44.242°N 76.496°W

Ontario electoral district

Defunct provincial electoral district
- Legislature: Legislative Assembly of Ontario
- District created: 1867
- District abolished: 1966
- First contested: 1867
- Last contested: 1963

Kingston was an electoral riding in Ontario, Canada. It was created in 1867 at the time of confederation and was abolished in 1966 before the 1967 election.

== Members of Provincial Parliament ==
Kingston
Assembly	Years	Member	Party
1st	1867–1871	Maxwell W. Strange	Conservative
2nd	1871–1874	William Robinson	Liberal
3rd	1875–1879	William Robinson	Liberal
4th	1879–1883	James Henry Metcalfe	Conservative
5th	1883–1886	James Henry Metcalfe	Conservative
6th	1886–1890	James Henry Metcalfe	Conservative
7th	1890–1892	James Henry Metcalfe	Conservative
7th	1892–1894	William Harty	Liberal
8th	1894–1895	Edward H. Smythe	Conservative
8th	1895–1898	William Harty	Liberal
9th	1898–1901	William Harty	Liberal
9th	1901–1902	Edward John Barker Pense	Liberal
10th	1902–1904	Edward John Barker Pense	Liberal
11th	1905–1908	Edward John Barker Pense	Liberal
12th	1908–1911	William Folger Nickle	Conservative
13th	1911–1914	Arthur Edward Ross	Conservative
14th	1914–1919	Arthur Edward Ross	Conservative
15th	1919–1922	Arthur Edward Ross	Conservative
15th	1922–1923	William Folger Nickle	Conservative
16th	1923–1926	William Folger Nickle	Conservative
17th	1926–1929	Thomas Ashmore Kidd	Conservative
18th	1929–1934	Thomas Ashmore Kidd	Conservative
19th	1934–1937	Thomas Ashmore Kidd	Conservative
20th	1937–1943	Thomas Ashmore Kidd	Conservative
21st	1943–1945	Harry Allan Stewart	Progressive Conservative
22nd	1945–1948	Harry Allan Stewart	Progressive Conservative
23rd	1948–1951	Harry Allan Stewart	Progressive Conservative
24th	1951–1955	William McAdam Nickle	Progressive Conservative
25th	1955–1959	William McAdam Nickle	Progressive Conservative
26th	1959–1963	William McAdam Nickle	Progressive Conservative
27th	1963–1967	Syl Apps	Progressive Conservative
Sourced from the Ontario Legislative Assembly
Merged into Kingston and the Islands before the 1967 election

== Election results ==
1963 Ontario general election
Party	Candidate	Votes	%	±%
Progressive Conservative	Syl Apps	10,092	49.11	–7.41
Liberal	William T. Mills	9,068	44.13	+5.98
New Democratic	Lavada Pinder	1,389	6.76	+1.44
Total valid votes		20,549	99.17	
Total rejected ballots		171	0.83	–0.47
Turnout		20,720	68.40	+4.66
Eligible voters		30,294		
Progressive Conservative hold		Swing		–6.70
Source: Elections Ontario

1959 Ontario general election
Party	Candidate	Votes	%	±%
Progressive Conservative	William McAdam Nickle	10,330	56.53	–0.56
Liberal	James L. Keenleyside	6,972	38.15	–0.84
Co-operative Commonwealth	Larry Moore	973	5.32	+1.41
Total valid votes		18,275	98.70	
Total rejected ballots		240	1.30	–0.08
Turnout		18,515	63.73	–1.65
Eligible voters		29,051		
Progressive Conservative hold		Swing		+0.14
Source: Elections Ontario

1955 Ontario general election
Party	Candidate	Votes	%	±%
Progressive Conservative	William McAdam Nickle	10,614	57.09	–0.25
Liberal	Robert H. Hay	7,250	39.00	+1.98
Co-operative Commonwealth	Floyd A. Allen	728	3.92	–1.73
Total valid votes		18,592	98.63	
Total rejected ballots		259	1.37	–0.02
Turnout		18,851	65.38	–8.72
Eligible voters		28,834		
Progressive Conservative hold		Swing		–1.12
Source: Elections Ontario

1951 Ontario general election
Party	Candidate	Votes	%	±%
Progressive Conservative	William McAdam Nickle	9,924	57.34	+10.91
Liberal	George W. Shurlleff	6,406	37.01	–3.06
Co-operative Commonwealth	Vera A. Cartwright	978	5.65	–7.85
Total valid votes		17,308	98.60	
Total rejected ballots		245	1.40	+0.52
Turnout		17,553	74.10	+6.13
Eligible voters		23,689		
Progressive Conservative hold		Swing		+6.99
Source: Elections Ontario

1948 Ontario general election
Party	Candidate	Votes	%	±%
Progressive Conservative	Harry Allan Stewart	7,367	46.42	–6.29
Liberal	William Henderson	6,359	40.07	+3.88
Co-operative Commonwealth	Henry Lennox Cartwright	2,143	13.50	+4.24
Total valid votes		15,869	99.12	
Total rejected ballots		141	0.88	–0.28
Turnout		16,010	67.97	–5.00
Eligible voters		23,555		
Progressive Conservative hold		Swing		–5.08
Source: Elections Ontario

1945 Ontario general election
Party	Candidate	Votes	%	±%
Progressive Conservative	Harry Allan Stewart	9,275	52.71	+6.22
Liberal	James de St. Remy	6,368	36.19	–0.51
Co-operative Commonwealth	William E. Owen	1,631	9.27	–7.54
Labor–Progressive	William T. Arnott	322	1.83	–
Total valid votes		17,596	98.84	
Total rejected ballots		206	1.16	+0.08
Turnout		17,802	72.97	+12.56
Eligible voters		24,397		
Progressive Conservative hold		Swing		+3.37
Source: Elections Ontario

1943 Ontario general election
Party	Candidate	Votes	%	±%
Progressive Conservative	Harry Allan Stewart	6,555	46.49	–4.10
Liberal	James de St. Remy	5,175	36.70	–12.71
Co-operative Commonwealth	William George Leonard	2,370	16.81	–
Total valid votes		14,100	98.92	
Total rejected ballots		154	1.08	+0.08
Turnout		14,254	60.40	–21.88
Eligible voters		23,598		
Progressive Conservative hold		Swing		+4.30
Source: Elections Ontario

1937 Ontario general election
Party	Candidate	Votes	%	±%
Conservative	Thomas Kidd	8,014	50.59	–3.33
Liberal	William Young Mills	7,827	49.41	+3.33
Total valid votes		15,841	99.00	
Total rejected ballots		160	1.00	+0.10
Turnout		16,001	82.28	+3.26
Eligible voters		19,446		
Conservative hold		Swing		–3.33
Source: Elections Ontario

1934 Ontario general election
Party	Candidate	Votes	%	±%
Conservative	Thomas Kidd	7,634	53.92	–
Liberal	George Bawden	6,525	46.08	–
Total valid votes		14,159	99.10	
Total rejected ballots		129	0.90	–
Turnout		14,288	79.02	–
Eligible voters		18,081		
Conservative hold		Swing		–
Source: Elections Ontario

1929 Ontario general election
Party	Candidate	Votes
Conservative	Thomas Kidd	acclaimed
Source: Elections Ontario

1926 Ontario general election
Party	Candidate	Votes	%	±%
Conservative	Thomas Kidd	6,705	60.45	–
Prohibitionist	William Folger Nickle	4,386	39.55	–
Total valid votes		11,091	99.12	
Total rejected ballots		98	0.88	–
Turnout		11,189	76.05	–
Eligible voters		14,712		
Conservative hold		Swing		–
Source: Elections Ontario

Ontario provincial by-election, August 16, 1923 Ministerial By-election, appointment as Attorney-General
Party	Candidate	Votes
Conservative	William Folger Nickle	acclaimed
Source: Elections Ontario

Ontario provincial by-election, 1923
Party	Candidate	Votes	%	±%
Conservative	William Folger Nickle	acclaimed		
Source: Elections Ontario

Ontario provincial by-election, February 6, 1922 Resignation of Arthur Edward Ross to contest the federal election
Party	Candidate	Votes	%	±%
Conservative	William Folger Nickle	5,102	53.22	–
Liberal	Robert Elliott	4,485	46.78	–
Total valid votes		9,587	99.29	
Total rejected ballots		69	0.71	–
Turnout		9,656	100.00	–
Eligible voters		9,656		
Conservative hold		Swing		–
Source: Elections Ontario

1919 Ontario general election
Party	Candidate	Votes
Conservative	Arthur Edward Ross	acclaimed
Source: Elections Ontario

1914 Ontario general election
Party	Candidate	Votes	%	±%
Conservative	Arthur Edward Ross	2,900	66.94	–
Liberal	Thomas F. Harrison	1,432	33.06	–
Total valid votes		4,332	98.84	
Total rejected ballots		51	1.16	–
Turnout		4,383	82.11	–
Eligible voters		5,338		
Conservative hold		Swing		–
Source: Elections Ontario

1911 Ontario general election
Party	Candidate	Votes
Conservative	Arthur Edward Ross	acclaimed
Source: Elections Ontario

1908 Ontario general election
Party	Candidate	Votes	%	±%
Conservative	William Folger Nickle	2,215	54.48	+4.90
Liberal	Edward John Barker Pense	1,822	44.81	–5.61
Labour	James Henry Metcalfe	29	0.71	–
Total valid votes		4,066	99.05	
Total rejected ballots		39	0.95	+0.95
Turnout		4,105	96.27	–
Eligible voters		4,264		
Conservative gain from Liberal		Swing		+5.25
Source: Elections Ontario

Ontario provincial by-election, January 29, 1906 Void election
Party	Candidate	Votes	%	±%
Liberal	Edward John Barker Pense	2,099	50.42	+0.20
Conservative	Donald McIntyre	2,064	49.58	–0.20
Total valid votes		4,163	100.00	
Total rejected ballots		–		
Turnout		4,163	–	–
Eligible voters				
Liberal hold		Swing		+0.20
Source: Elections Ontario

1905 Ontario general election
Party	Candidate	Votes	%	±%
Liberal	Edward John Barker Pense	2,238	50.22	–1.50
Conservative	Donald Malcolm McIntyre	2,218	49.78	+1.50
Total valid votes		4,456	99.20	
Total rejected ballots		36	0.80	–0.84
Turnout		4,492	91.13	+4.75
Eligible voters		4,929		
Liberal hold		Swing		–1.50
Source: Elections Ontario

1902 Ontario general election
Party	Candidate	Votes	%	±%
Liberal	Edward John Barker Pense	2,043	51.72	–
Conservative	J. M. Shaw	1,907	48.28	–
Total valid votes		3,950	98.36	
Total rejected ballots		66	1.64	–
Turnout		4,016	86.38	–
Eligible voters		4,649		
Liberal hold		Swing		–
Source: Elections Ontario

Ontario provincial by-election, January 30, 1902 Resignation of William Harty to contest the federal election
Party	Candidate	Votes
Liberal	Edward John Barker Pense	acclaimed
Source: Elections Ontario

1898 Ontario general election
Party	Candidate	Votes	%	±%
Liberal	William Harty	2,125	53.66	–
Conservative	Edward H. Smythe	1,835	46.34	–
Total valid votes		3,960	98.48	
Total rejected ballots		61	1.52	–
Turnout		4,021	84.35	–
Eligible voters		4,767		
Liberal hold		Swing		–
Source: Elections Ontario

Ontario provincial by-election, October 8, 1895 Void election
Party	Candidate	Votes
Liberal	William Harty	acclaimed
Source: Elections Ontario

Ontario provincial by-election, January 28, 1895 Edward H. Smythe appointed a judge
Party	Candidate	Votes	%	±%
Liberal	William Harty	2,282	55.23	+5.24
Conservative	Edward H. Smythe	1,850	44.77	–5.24
Total valid votes		4,132	100.00	
Total rejected ballots		–		
Turnout		4,132	–	–
Eligible voters				
Liberal gain from Conservative		Swing		+5.24
Source: Elections Ontario

1894 Ontario general election
Party	Candidate	Votes	%	±%
Conservative	Edward H. Smythe	1,710	50.01	+9.79
Liberal	William Harty	1,709	49.99	–9.79
Total valid votes		3,419	98.84	
Total rejected ballots		40	1.16	+1.16
Turnout		3,459	80.89	–
Eligible voters		4,276		
Conservative gain from Liberal		Swing		+9.79
Source: Elections Ontario

Ontario provincial by-election, February 29, 1892 Resignation of James Henry Metcalfe to contest the federal election
Party	Candidate	Votes	%	±%
Liberal	William Harty	2,336	59.77	+10.22
Conservative	William Drennan	1,572	40.23	–10.22
Total valid votes		3,908	100.00	
Total rejected ballots		–		
Turnout		3,908	–	–
Eligible voters				
Liberal gain from Conservative		Swing		+10.22
Source: Elections Ontario

1890 Ontario general election
Party	Candidate	Votes	%	±%
Conservative	James Henry Metcalfe	1,629	50.45	–3.12
Liberal	J. D. Thompson	1,600	49.55	+3.12
Total valid votes		3,229	98.69	
Total rejected ballots		43	1.31	–0.19
Turnout		3,272	58.16	–7.87
Eligible voters		5,626		
Conservative hold		Swing		–3.12
Source: Elections Ontario

1886 Ontario general election
Party	Candidate	Votes	%	±%
Conservative	James Henry Metcalfe	1,853	53.57	+0.88
Liberal	J. L. Whiting	1,606	46.43	–0.27
Total valid votes		3,459	98.49	
Total rejected ballots		53	1.51	–0.07
Turnout		3,512	66.03	+6.09
Eligible voters		5,319		
Conservative hold		Swing		+0.58
Source: Elections Ontario

1883 Ontario general election
Party	Candidate	Votes	%	±%
Conservative	James Henry Metcalfe	951	52.69	–3.13
Liberal	Charles Fuller Gildersleeve	843	46.70	+2.52
Independent Liberal	J. Rourke	8	0.44	–
Independent	John Stewart	3	0.17	–
Total valid votes		1,805	98.42	
Total rejected ballots		29	1.58	+1.58
Turnout		1,834	59.93	+0.40
Eligible voters		3,060		
Conservative hold		Swing		–2.82
Source: Elections Ontario

1879 Ontario general election
Party	Candidate	Votes	%	±%
Conservative	James Henry Metcalfe	955	55.82	+9.99
Liberal	William Robinson	756	44.18	-9.99
Total valid votes		1,711	59.53	−5.01
Eligible voters		2,874		
Conservative gain		Swing		+9.99
Source: Elections Ontario

1875 Ontario general election
Party	Candidate	Votes	%
Liberal	William Robinson	935	54.17
Liberal–Conservative	James McCammon	791	45.83
Turnout		1,726	64.55
Eligible voters		2,674	
Source for vote tally: "Data Explorer". Elections Ontario. 1875. Contemporaneous news reporting consistently identified Robinson as having sought re-election as a liberal, with Liberal leader Mowat personally stumping for him in Kingston days before the election.

1871 Ontario general election
Party	Candidate	Votes	%	
Independent	William Robinson	607	50.04	
Independent	Mr. Breden	586	48.31	
Independent	John Stewart	20	1.65	
Turnout		1,213	58.21	+21.07
Eligible voters		2,084		
Source for vote: "Data Explorer". Elections Ontario. 1871. Contemporanous news report indicate Robinson sought election in 1871 as am independent and became firmly a part of the Liberal/Reform Party soon after the election and campaign as a Liberal in subsequent elections.

1867 Ontario general election
Party	Candidate	Votes	%
Conservative	Maxwell W. Strange	705	84.63
Liberal	John Stewart	128	15.37
Total valid votes		833	37.14
Eligible voters		2,243	
Conservative pickup new district.			
Source: Elections Ontario
