= Kingston (federal electoral district) =

Former federal electoral district in Ontario, Canada

Coordinates: 44.242°N 76.496°W

Ontario electoral district

Defunct federal electoral district
- Legislature: House of Commons
- District created: 1867, 1952
- District abolished: 1924, 1966
- First contested: 1867
- Last contested: 1965

Kingston was a federal electoral district represented in the House of Commons of Canada from 1867 to 1925 and from 1953 to 1968. It was located in the province of Ontario. It was created by the British North America Act 1867, and initially consisted of the city of Kingston, Ontario. In 1903, it was expanded to include the village of Portsmouth.

The electoral district was abolished in 1924 when it was redistributed into Kingston City riding.

In 1952, a new Kingston riding was created from Kingston City and parts of Frontenac—Addington ridings. It consisted of the city of Kingston and the townships of Pittsburg, Storrington, Kingston, Howe Island, and Wolfe Island (including Simcoe Island, Horse Shoe Island, and Mud Island) in the county of Frontenac.

The electoral district was abolished in 1966 when it was redistributed between Frontenac—Lennox and Addington and Kingston and the Islands ridings.

== Members of Parliament ==
This riding elected the following members of the House of Commons of Canada:

| Parliament | Years | Member | Party |
|---|---|---|---|
| 1st | 1867–1872 | John A. Macdonald | Liberal–Conservative |
| 2nd | 1872–1874 | John A. Macdonald | Liberal–Conservative |
| 3rd | 1874–1874 | John A. Macdonald | Liberal–Conservative |
| 3rd | 1874–1878 | John A. Macdonald | Liberal–Conservative |
| 4th | 1878–1882 | Alexander Gunn | Liberal |
| 5th | 1882–1887 | Alexander Gunn | Liberal |
| 6th | 1887–1891 | John A. Macdonald | Conservative |
| 7th | 1891–1891† | John A. Macdonald | Conservative |
| 7th | 1892–1896 | James Henry Metcalfe | Conservative |
| 8th | 1896–1900 | Byron Moffatt Britton | Liberal |
| 9th | 1900–1901 | Byron Moffatt Britton | Liberal |
| 9th | 1902–1904 | William Harty | Liberal |
| 10th | 1904–1908 | William Harty | Liberal |
| 11th | 1908–1911 | William Harty | Liberal |
| 12th | 1911–1917 | William Folger Nickle | Conservative |
| 13th | 1917–1919 | William Folger Nickle | Government (Unionist) |
| 13th | 1919–1921 | Henry Lumley Drayton | Government (Unionist) |
| 14th | 1921–1925 | Arthur Edward Ross | Conservative |
Riding dissolved into Kingston City
Riding re-created from Kingston City and Frontenac—Addington
| 22nd | 1953–1957 | William Henderson | Liberal |
| 23rd | 1957–1958 | William Henderson | Liberal |
| 24th | 1958–1962 | Benjamin Allmark | Progressive Conservative |
| 25th | 1962–1963 | Edgar Benson | Liberal |
| 26th | 1963–1965 | Edgar Benson | Liberal |
| 27th | 1965–1968 | Edgar Benson | Liberal |
Riding dissolved into Kingston and the Islands and Frontenac—Lennox and Addington

== Election results ==
=== 1867–1925 ===
1867 Canadian federal election
| Party | Candidate | Votes | % |
|---|---|---|---|
| Liberal–Conservative | John A. Macdonald | 735 | 83.8% |
| Unknown | John Stewart | 142 | 16.2% |
| Total | | 877 | |
Source(s) Library of Parliament – History of Federal Ridings since 1867: Kingston

1872 Canadian federal election
| Party | Candidate | Votes | % |
|---|---|---|---|
| Liberal–Conservative | John A. Macdonald (incumbent) | 735 | 54.9% |
| Unknown | John Carruthers | 604 | 45.1% |
| Total | | 1,339 | |
Source(s) Library of Parliament – History of Federal Ridings since 1867: Kingston

1874 Canadian federal election
| Party | Candidate | Votes | % |
|---|---|---|---|
| Liberal–Conservative | John A. Macdonald (incumbent) | 839 | 51.2% |
| Unknown | John Carruthers | 801 | 48.8% |
| Total | | 1,640 | |
Source: lop.parl.ca

Canadian federal by-election, 29 December 1874 On Macdonald's election being declared void on 21 November
| Party | Candidate | Votes | % |
|---|---|---|---|
| Liberal–Conservative | John A. Macdonald (incumbent) | 889 | 50.5% |
| Unknown | John Carruthers | 872 | 49.5% |
| Total | | 1,761 | |
Source: lop.parl.ca

1878 Canadian federal election
| Party | Candidate | Votes | % |
|---|---|---|---|
| Liberal | Alexander Gunn | 991 | 53.7% |
| Liberal–Conservative | John A. Macdonald (incumbent) | 847 | 45.9% |
| Unknown | John Stewart | 6 | 0.3% |
| Total | | 1,844 | |
Source(s) Library of Parliament – History of Federal Ridings since 1867: Kingston

1882 Canadian federal election
| Party | Candidate | Votes |
|---|---|---|
| Liberal | Alexander Gunn | 889 |
| Unknown | Michael Sullivan | 797 |

1887 Canadian federal election
| Party | Candidate | Votes | % |
|---|---|---|---|
| Liberal–Conservative | John A. Macdonald | 1,368 | 50.3% |
| Liberal | Alexander Gunn (incumbent) | 1,351 | 49.7% |
| Total | | 2,719 | |
Source(s) Library of Parliament – History of Federal Ridings since 1867: Kingston

1891 Canadian federal election
| Party | Candidate | Votes | % |
|---|---|---|---|
| Liberal–Conservative | John A. Macdonald (incumbent) | 1,784 | 57.3% |
| Liberal | Alexander Gunn | 1,301 | 41.8% |
| Unknown | Major Edwards | 29 | 0.9% |
| Total | | 3,114 | |
Source(s) Library of Parliament – History of Federal Ridings since 1867: Kingston

Canadian federal by-election, 28 January 1892 On Mr. Macdonald's death, 6 June 1891
| Party | Candidate | Votes |
|---|---|---|
| Conservative | James Henry Metcalfe | acclaimed |

1896 Canadian federal election
| Party | Candidate | Votes |
|---|---|---|
| Liberal | Byron Moffatt Britton | 1,671 |
| Conservative | Donald Malcolm McIntyre | 1,519 |

1900 Canadian federal election
| Party | Candidate | Votes |
|---|---|---|
| Liberal | Byron Moffatt Britton | 1,879 |
| Conservative | Donald Malcolm McIntyre | 1,687 |

Canadian federal by-election, 15 January 1902 On Mr. Britton being appointed Judge of the Court of King's Bench for Ontario, 24 September 1901
| Party | Candidate | Votes |
|---|---|---|
| Liberal | William Harty | 2,116 |
| Conservative | James Henry Metcalfe | 1,364 |

1904 Canadian federal election
| Party | Candidate | Votes |
|---|---|---|
| Liberal | William Harty | 2,267 |
| Conservative | John Gaskin | 1,735 |
| Unknown | Christopher J. Graham | 55 |

1908 Canadian federal election
| Party | Candidate | Votes |
|---|---|---|
| Liberal | William Harty | 2,224 |
| Conservative | Arthur Edward Ross | 1,875 |

1911 Canadian federal election
| Party | Candidate | Votes |
|---|---|---|
| Conservative | William Folger Nickle | 2,322 |
| Liberal | John McDonald Mowat | 1,977 |

1917 Canadian federal election
| Party | Candidate | Votes |
|---|---|---|
| Government (Unionist) | William Folger Nickle | 6,194 |
| Opposition (Laurier Liberals) | Alexander White Richardson | 1,782 |

Canadian federal by-election, 20 October 1919 On Mr. Nickle's resignation, 7 July 1919
| Party | Candidate | Votes |
|---|---|---|
| Government (Unionist) | Henry Lumley Drayton | acclaimed |

1921 Canadian federal election
| Party | Candidate | Votes |
|---|---|---|
| Conservative | Arthur Edward Ross | 6,055 |
| Liberal | John Murdoch Campbell | 5,884 |

=== 1953–1968 ===
1953 Canadian federal election
| Party | Candidate | Votes |
|---|---|---|
| Liberal | William James Henderson | 14,663 |
| Progressive Conservative | Wilbert Aylesworth | 11,806 |
| Co-operative Commonwealth | Pearl Runnalls | 731 |

1957 Canadian federal election
| Party | Candidate | Votes |
|---|---|---|
| Liberal | William James Henderson | 14,728 |
| Progressive Conservative | Thomas Ashmore Kidd | 12,977 |
| Co-operative Commonwealth | James Allan Millard | 1,032 |

1958 Canadian federal election
| Party | Candidate | Votes |
|---|---|---|
| Progressive Conservative | Benjamin Allmark | 16,989 |
| Liberal | William James Henderson | 14,862 |
| Co-operative Commonwealth | John H. McKinnon | 887 |

1962 Canadian federal election
| Party | Candidate | Votes |
|---|---|---|
| Liberal | Edgar Benson | 16,828 |
| Progressive Conservative | Benjamin Allmark | 13,599 |
| New Democratic | John McKinnon | 1,468 |
| Social Credit | Ernest Hogan | 214 |

1963 Canadian federal election
| Party | Candidate | Votes |
|---|---|---|
| Liberal | Edgar Benson | 18,425 |
| Progressive Conservative | J. Earl McEwen | 12,879 |
| New Democratic | Denis Kalman | 2,400 |
| Social Credit | Grace C.A. Gough | 194 |

1965 Canadian federal election
| Party | Candidate | Votes |
|---|---|---|
| Liberal | Edgar Benson | 16,022 |
| Progressive Conservative | J. Earl McEwen | 12,766 |
| New Democratic | John Meister | 3,530 |

Parliament of Canada
| Preceded by None | Riding represented by the prime minister 1867-1873 | Succeeded by Lambton |
| Preceded by Carleton | Riding represented by the prime minister 1887-1891 | Succeeded by Vacant; next was Antigonish, in 1892 |

== See also ==
- List of Canadian electoral districts
- Historical federal electoral districts of Canada
