= John Strange (Upper Canada politician) =

Upper Canada politician

John Strange (September 2, 1788 – October 14, 1840) was a merchant and political figure in Upper Canada.

He was born in East Kilbride, Scotland in 1788 and emigrated with several siblings around 1805. He served during the War of 1812 as a volunteer in the Canadian Militia, being a Lieutenant of the first Regiment of the Royal Lanarkshire Light Infantry Militia. He was present at the Battle of Lundy's Lane and at Fort Erie. At the close of the war, John settled in Kingston and became Major in the First Regiment of the Frontenac Militia. In 1818, he married Mary McGill in Albany, New York (sister of his brother Maxwell's wife Elizabeth). John built a limestone house in Kingston between 1824 and 1826 that served as the family home at the site of what is now 55 Barrack Street in Kingston. There is a historic plaque on the site. He was named a justice of the peace for the Midland District in 1834. In the same year, he was elected to the Legislative Assembly of Upper Canada for Frontenac County. He died at Caledonia Springs in 1840. He was originally buried in the Upper Burial Grounds (now McBurney Park in Kingston Ontario), and his remains later relocated to Cataraqui Cemetery. His headstone is laid flat in the ground but still legible.

Strange was a father of five, of whom only two survived to adulthood. His son Maxwell served as a conservative in the Ontario legislative assembly 1867–1871. Another son, Orlando, was Mayor of Kingston in 1859–1860. He also raised his brother Maxwell's four children, who were orphaned in Albany in 1826.
