= John Gaskin =

Canadian politician (1840–1908)

John Gaskin (April 3, 1840 – March 21, 1908) was a ship's captain, business manager and politician in Ontario, Canada. He served as mayor of Kingston in 1882.

The son of Robert Gaskin and Margaret Burton, he was born in Kingston, Upper Canada, the son of immigrants from Ireland, and was educated in Kingston. He first worked for a butcher and then became deckhand on a steamer. At the age of 24, he was captain of a ship on the Great Lakes.

He took part in the defence of the province during the Fenian raids as a private in the 14th Battalion P.W.O.R. for which he received the Canada General Service Medal.

From 1871 to 1901, he was employed with the Montreal Transportation Company. He became manager for the company and took on responsibility for the maintenance of its fleet. He was opposed to trade unions and, on several occasions, fired employees who joined a union. He served on the local public school board and the Kingston Board of Trade, serving as president in 1902.

Gaskin represented Victoria Ward on Kingston city council for seven years and later represented Cataraqui Ward for another nine years. A prominent Orangeman, he was known for his bias against Catholics. In 1879, he became founding president of the Protestant Protective Society, whose aim was to protect jobs for Protestants. Gaskin ran unsuccessfully as a Conservative for the Kingston seat in the Canadian House of Commons in 1904, losing to Liberal William Harty.

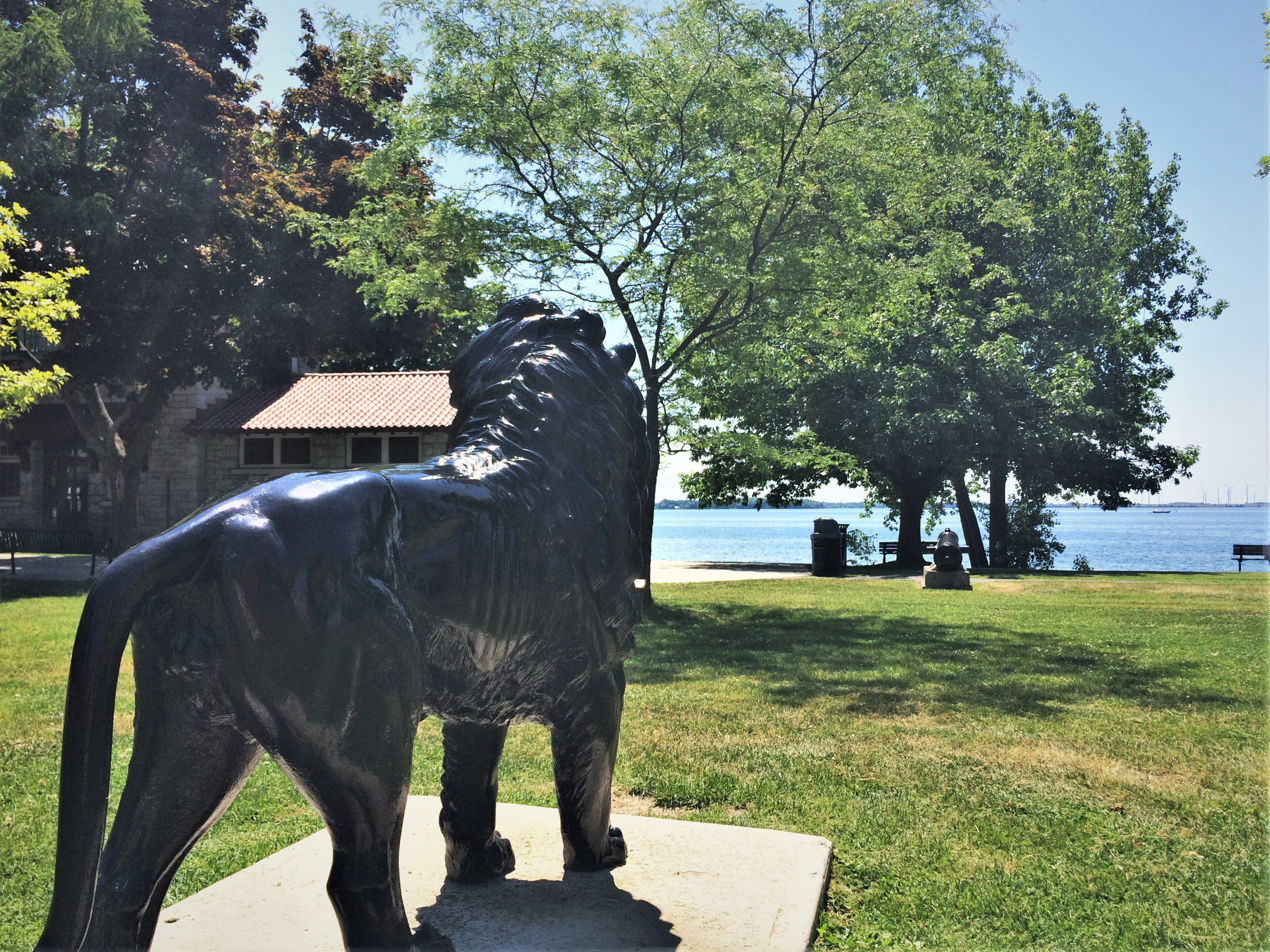
Gaskin's lion statue in MacDonald Park

He was married twice: first to Mary McAlister in 1867 and then to Stella Macdonald in 1890.

Gaskin died in Kingston at the age of 67.

An iron lion which originally stood at his house was donated to the city by Gaskin's family in 1909 and stands in Kingston's MacDonald Park. It was restored (9 July 2010) by the Ukrainian Canadian Club of Kingston and the League of Ukrainian Canadians (Kingston branch) to mark the 100th anniversary of Ukrainian settlement in the Kingston area.
