= Jack Chiang =

Canadian journalist and writer

Jack F. Chiang
- Born: Guangzhou, China
- Education: National Taiwan University (BA); Marquette University (MA)
- Occupations: Journalist, author
- Spouse: Cathy Lincoln-Chiang
- Children: 4

Jack F. Chiang CM OOnt is a Canadian journalist and author.

== Biography ==
=== Early life and education ===
Jack Chiang was born in Guangzhou, China, and grew up in Macau, Hong Kong, and Taiwan. He graduated with a B.A. in Foreign Languages and Literature (French) from the National Taiwan University, and a master's degree in journalism from Marquette University in Milwaukee, Wisconsin.

Chiang was a journalist, editor, columnist, and a newsroom manager for more than 25 years.

Chiang has received honorary Doctor of Laws degrees from both Queen's University and the Royal Military College of Canada. He also has received an honorary diploma from St. Lawrence College. He speaks fluent Cantonese, Mandarin, English and French.

=== Career ===
Chiang began his career as a court reporter for the Orillia Packet and Times daily. He was a member of the newsroom management team of the Kingston Whig-Standard daily newspaper between 1980 and 2007. Earlier in his career, he was sent on assignments in Pakistan, Afghanistan, Romania, Ethiopia, the Amazon River, the Caribbean Islands, England, and other European and African countries.

His work has been featured in every major newspaper in Canada, as well as the International Herald-Tribune, The New York Times and the Moscow News. He has been interviewed by all three Canadian national TV networks, as well as CBC Radio One shows As It Happens, Radio Noon, and Ontario Morning.

Chiang was the city editor of the Kingston Whig-Standard from 1994 to 1995 and 1998 as well as a daily columnist from 1995 to 2007. He joined the Ontario Court of Justice in May 2007.

=== Aerobatic aircraft ===
An aviation enthusiast, he has flown 15 times with some of the world’s top aerobatic-flying teams: the Snowbirds, the Smoke Squadron, French Connection, the Northern Lights, the Ray Ban Gold Aerobatic Team, and the Bill Carter aerobatics.

=== Volunteer work ===
Chiang was the chair or honorary chair of more than 50 successful charitable campaigns for such organizations as the United Way, the Boys and Girls Club, Kingston Literacy, the Alzheimer's Society, and the Salvation Army.

He was a member of the board of directors of both the Boys & Girls Clubs of Canada and the Boys & Girls Clubs of Ontario, and is a governor of Kingston General Hospital.

Chiang is currently chair of the advisory committee of Immigrant Services Kingston-area (ISKA) and a member of the board of directors of L’Association française-canadienne de l’Ontario (AFCO) for the Thousand Islands region since June 2010. He is an active member of the local francophone community.

In 2008, he was chosen by Governor General of Canada Michaëlle Jean to be one of the 20 national mentors who each guided one of Canada’s 20 most promising young people.

== Awards ==
Chiang has won more than 45 major awards, including the Order of Canada, the Order of Ontario, Kingston’s Citizen of the Year, Government of Canada International Year of Volunteers Medal, the Ontario Provincial Police Commissioner’s Citation, the International Law Enforcement Award, the Queen Elizabeth II Diamond Jubilee Medal, the Queen Elizabeth II Golden Jubilee Medal, the Greater Kingston Chamber of Commerce President’s Award, the Salvation Army Honorary Life Member, the Salvation Army Timbrel Award, Outstanding Fundraiser (Association of Fundraising Professional, Southeastern Ontario), the United Way Builder Award, the National Public-speaking Champion (of Taiwan) and five major university scholarships.

== Published works ==
- Images of Kingston (Quarry Press, 1990)
- Celebrating Ontario (Fitzhenry & Whiteside, 2004)
- Celebrating Atlantic Canada (Fitzhenry & Whiteside, 2006)
- Jack Chiang's Thousand Islands (Fitzhenry & Whiteside, 2006)
- Jack Chiang's Kingston (Fitzhenry & Whiteside, 2006)

He is also the co-author (with Lt-Col Peter Dawe) of Truth, Duty, Valour, Canada’s Military Colleges.

== Personal life ==
Chiang and his Quebec-born wife Cathy Lincoln-Chiang have four children: Adrian Coleman, Alastair Coleman, Jeffrey James Chiang and J. Christopher Chiang.
