= William McAdam Nickle =

Canadian politician

Ontario MPP
- In office 1951–1963
- Preceded by: Harry Allan Stewart
- Succeeded by: Syl Apps
- Constituency: Kingston

Personal details
- Born: January 4, 1897 Kingston, Ontario
- Died: December 10, 1968 (aged 71) Collins Bay, Ontario
- Party: Progressive Conservative
- Spouse: Grace Dunlop (m. 1925)

William McAdam Nickle (January 4, 1897 – December 10, 1968) was an Ontario political figure. He represented Kingston in the Legislative Assembly of Ontario from 1951 to 1963 as a Progressive Conservative member.

He was born in Kingston, Ontario, and was educated there and at Osgoode Hall. He served with the Princess Patricia's Canadian Light Infantry and was wounded in World War I. Nickle served in the provincial cabinet as Provincial Secretary and Registrar in 1955, Minister of Planning and Development from 1955 to 1961 and Minister Without Portfolio from 1961 to 1962. He died at his home after a long illness in 1968.

== Family ==
Nickle was born to Agnes Mary McAdam and William Folger Nickle, a predecessor in his role as Kingston's provincial representative. The senior Nickle represented Kingston in Queen's Park from 1908 to 1911, in House of Commons from 1911 to 1919 (in the final year he moved and have passed a resolution on which the Canadian government's policy on advising the monarch to refrain from granting hereditary peerages and knighthoods to Canadians, commonly known as the Nickle Resolution), and again in Queen's Park from 1922 to 1926 and served as Ontario's Attorney General from 1923 until resigning from cabinet and the Conservative Party in protest of its policy toward repealing prohibition.

In 1925, he married Grace Dunlop.
