= The French Connection =

The French Connection or French Connection may refer to:

- French Connection, a heroin trafficking scheme

== Literature, film and television ==
- The French Connection (book), a 1969 non-fiction book by Robin Moore about the drug trafficking scheme
- The French Connection (film), a 1971 film based on the book
  - French Connection II, a 1975 sequel to the 1971 film
- The Connection (2014 action film), a French-Belgian action crime thriller directed by Cédric Jimenez
- "French Connection" (Jack Ryan), a 2018 TV episode
- "The French Connection" (The O.C.), a 2007 TV episode

== Music ==
- French Connection (album), a 2009 album by Kate Ryan
- French Connection, a 2009 mixtape by Frenchie
- French Connection Part 2, a 2010 mixtape by Frenchie

== Other uses ==
- French Connection (clothing), a UK-based clothing company, also branded as "FCUK" or "fcuk"
- The French Connection (aerobatics), an aerobatic team
- French Connection (cocktail), an IBA standard variation on the Godfather containing equal parts cognac and amaretto
- The French Connection (ice hockey), nickname for a Buffalo Sabres line in the 1970s

== See also ==
- FCUK: Father Chitti Umaa Kaarthik, 2021 Indian film by Vidyasagar Raju
