= Allmark =

Allmark is a surname. Notable people with the surname include:

- Benjamin Allmark (1911–2004), Canadian politician
- Dean Allmark (born 1983), English professional wrestler
- Jennifer Allmark (born 1969), Swedish professional golfer
