= Warren Stringer =

Canadian politician from Ontario

Member of the Ontario Provincial Parliament for Haldimand
- In office October 20, 1919 – May 10, 1923
- Preceded by: William Jaques
- Succeeded by: Richard Nixon Berry

Personal details
- Party: United Farmers

Warren Stringer was a Canadian politician from Ontario. He represented Haldimand in the Legislative Assembly of Ontario from 1919 to 1923.

== See also ==
- 15th Parliament of Ontario
