= Haldimand (provincial electoral district) =

Former provincial electoral district in Ontario, Canada

Ontario electoral district

Defunct provincial electoral district
- Legislature: Legislative Assembly of Ontario
- District created: 1867
- District abolished: 1934
- First contested: 1867
- Last contested: 1929

Haldimand was an electoral riding in Ontario, Canada. It was created in 1867 at the time of confederation and was abolished in 1933 before the 1934 election.

== Members of Provincial Parliament ==
Haldimand
Assembly	Years	Member	Party
1st	1867–1871	Jacob Baxter	Liberal
2nd	1871–1874	Jacob Baxter	Liberal
3rd	1875–1879	Jacob Baxter	Liberal
4th	1879–1883	Jacob Baxter	Liberal
5th	1883–1886	Jacob Baxter	Liberal
6th	1886–1890	Jacob Baxter	Liberal
7th	1890–1894	Jacob Baxter	Liberal
8th	1894–1898	Jacob Baxter	Liberal
9th	1898–1902	Joseph William Holmes	Liberal
10th	1902–1904	Joseph William Holmes	Liberal
11th	1905–1908	Jacob Kohler	Liberal
12th	1908–1911	Jacob Kohler	Liberal
13th	1911–1914	Christian Kohler	Liberal
14th	1914–1919	William Jaques	Conservative
15th	1919–1923	Warren Stringer	United Farmers
16th	1923–1926	Richard Nixon Berry	Conservative
17th	1926–1929	Robert Francis Miller	Liberal
18th	1929–1934	Richard Nixon Berry	Conservative
Sourced from the Ontario Legislative Assembly
Merged into Haldimand—Norfolk before the 1934 election

== Election results ==
1929 Ontario general election
Party	Candidate	Votes	%	±%
Conservative	Richard Nixon Berry	4,993	50.14	+4.11
Liberal	Robert Francis Miller	4,965	49.86	–4.11
Total valid votes		9,958	99.34	
Total rejected ballots		66	0.66	+0.16
Turnout		10,024	74.85	+1.56
Eligible voters		13,393		
Conservative gain from Liberal		Swing		+4.11
Source: Elections Ontario

1926 Ontario general election
Party	Candidate	Votes	%	±%
Liberal	Robert Francis Miller	5,212	53.97	+41.96
Conservative	William J. Griffith	4,445	46.03	–1.53
Total valid votes		9,657	99.51	
Total rejected ballots		48	0.49	–0.18
Turnout		9,705	73.29	+7.33
Eligible voters		13,242		
Liberal gain from Conservative		Swing		–
Source: Elections Ontario

1923 Ontario general election
Party	Candidate	Votes	%	±%
Conservative	Richard Nixon Berry	4,297	47.56	+7.39
United Farmers	Warren Stringer	3,653	40.43	–19.40
Liberal	Richard Colter	1,085	12.01	–
Total valid votes		9,035	99.33	
Total rejected ballots		61	0.67	–2.05
Turnout		9,096	65.96	–16.67
Eligible voters		13,791		
Conservative gain from United Farmers		Swing		+13.39
Source: Elections Ontario

1919 Ontario general election
Party	Candidate	Votes	%	±%
United Farmers	Warren Stringer	6,056	59.83	–
Conservative	William Jaques	4,066	40.17	–12.85
Total valid votes		10,122	97.28	
Total rejected ballots		283	2.72	+2.25
Turnout		10,405	82.63	–7.72
Eligible voters		12,593		
United Farmers gain from Conservative		Swing		–
Source: Elections Ontario

1914 Ontario general election
Party	Candidate	Votes	%	±%
Conservative	William Jaques	2,692	53.02	+9.23
Liberal	David Zelland Gibson	2,385	46.98	–9.23
Total valid votes		5,077	99.53	
Total rejected ballots		24	0.47	–0.40
Turnout		5,101	90.35	+12.12
Eligible voters		5,646		
Conservative gain from Liberal		Swing		+9.23
Source: Elections Ontario

1911 Ontario general election
Party	Candidate	Votes	%	±%
Liberal	Christian Kohler	1,924	56.21	+1.40
Conservative	William Jaques	1,499	43.79	–1.40
Total valid votes		3,423	99.13	
Total rejected ballots		30	0.87	–0.01
Turnout		3,453	78.23	–17.99
Eligible voters		4,414		
Liberal hold		Swing		+1.40
Source: Elections Ontario

1908 Ontario general election
Party	Candidate	Votes	%	±%
Liberal	Jacob Kohler	1,977	54.81	–2.69
Conservative	William Jaques	1,630	45.19	+2.69
Total valid votes		3,607	99.12	
Total rejected ballots		32	0.88	+0.20
Turnout		3,639	96.22	+10.10
Eligible voters		3,782		
Liberal hold		Swing		–2.69
Source: Elections Ontario

1905 Ontario general election
Party	Candidate	Votes	%	±%
Liberal	Jacob Kohler	2,019	57.50	+5.24
Conservative	M. McConnell	1,492	42.50	–
Total valid votes		3,511	99.32	
Total rejected ballots		24	0.68	+0.01
Turnout		3,535	86.11	+14.40
Eligible voters		4,105		
Liberal hold		Swing		+2.62
Source: Elections Ontario

1902 Ontario general election
Party	Candidate	Votes	%	±%
Liberal	Joseph William Holmes	1,705	52.27	+0.93
Independent Conservative	Samuel R. Beck	1,557	47.73	–
Total valid votes		3,262	99.33	
Total rejected ballots		22	0.67	+0.15
Turnout		3,284	71.72	–13.42
Eligible voters		4,579		
Liberal hold		Swing		+0.47
Source: Elections Ontario

1898 Ontario general election
Party	Candidate	Votes	%	±%
Liberal	Joseph William Holmes	1,957	51.34	–2.59
Conservative	Francis Ramsey Lalor	1,855	48.66	+2.59
Total valid votes		3,812	99.48	
Total rejected ballots		20	0.52	+0.52
Turnout		3,832	85.14	–
Eligible voters		4,501		
Liberal hold		Swing		–2.59
Source: Elections Ontario

Ontario provincial by-election, March 19, 1895 Void election
Party	Candidate	Votes	%	±%
Liberal	Jacob Baxter	1,920	53.93	+4.16
Conservative	John Senn	1,640	46.07	–4.16
Total valid votes		3,560	100.00	
Total rejected ballots		–		
Turnout		3,560	–	–
Eligible voters				
Liberal gain from Conservative		Swing		+4.16
Source: Elections Ontario

1894 Ontario general election
Party	Candidate	Votes	%	±%
Conservative	John Senn	1,693	50.22	+4.76
Liberal	Jacob Baxter	1,678	49.78	–4.76
Total valid votes		3,371	99.56	
Total rejected ballots		15	0.44	–0.80
Turnout		3,386	76.00	–4.99
Eligible voters		4,455		
Conservative gain from Liberal		Swing		+4.76
Source: Elections Ontario

1890 Ontario general election
Party	Candidate	Votes	%	±%
Liberal	Jacob Baxter	2,000	54.54	+0.87
Conservative	Edmund Ernest Sheppard	1,667	45.46	–0.87
Total valid votes		3,667	98.76	
Total rejected ballots		46	1.24	+1.24
Turnout		3,713	81.00	+8.23
Eligible voters		4,584		
Liberal hold		Swing		+0.87
Source: Elections Ontario

1886 Ontario general election
Party	Candidate	Votes	%	±%
Liberal	Jacob Baxter	1,936	53.67	+2.76
Conservative	George Martin	1,671	46.33	–2.76
Total valid votes		3,607	100.00	
Total rejected ballots		–		
Turnout		3,607	72.77	–6.11
Eligible voters		4,957		
Liberal hold		Swing		+2.76
Source: Elections Ontario

1883 Ontario general election
Party	Candidate	Votes	%	±%
Liberal	Jacob Baxter	1,708	50.91	–0.10
Conservative	Alex W. Thompson	1,647	49.09	+0.10
Total valid votes		3,355	99.26	
Total rejected ballots		25	0.74	+0.74
Turnout		3,380	78.88	+2.44
Eligible voters		4,285		
Liberal hold		Swing		–0.10
Source: Elections Ontario

1879 Ontario general election
Party	Candidate	Votes	%	±%
Liberal	Jacob Baxter	1,612	51.01	−2.86
Conservative	Mr. Thompson	1,548	48.99	+2.86
Total valid votes		3,160	76.44	+0.60
Eligible voters		4,134		
Liberal hold		Swing		−2.86
Source: Elections Ontario

1875 Ontario general election
Party	Candidate	Votes	%	±%
Liberal	Jacob Baxter	1,476	53.87	−6.91
Conservative	R. Waldbrook	1,264	46.13	+6.91
Turnout		2,740	75.84	+15.94
Eligible voters		3,613		
Liberal hold		Swing		−6.91
Source: Elections Ontario

1871 Ontario general election
Party	Candidate	Votes	%	±%
Liberal	Jacob Baxter	1,212	60.78	+4.35
Conservative	Mr. Amsden	782	39.22	−4.35
Turnout		1,994	59.90	−18.46
Eligible voters		3,329		
Liberal hold		Swing		+4.35
Source: Elections Ontario

1867 Ontario general election
Party	Candidate	Votes	%
Liberal	Jacob Baxter	1,377	56.43
Conservative	Mr. Hurssell	1,063	43.57
Total valid votes		2,440	78.36
Eligible voters		3,114	
Liberal pickup new district.			
Source: Elections Ontario
