= Maxwell W. Strange =

Canadian politician

Ontario MPP
- In office 1867–1871
- Preceded by: Riding established
- Succeeded by: William Robinson
- Constituency: Kingston

Personal details
- Born: March 22, 1820 Kingston, Ontario
- Died: September 28, 1880 (aged 60)
- Party: Conservative
- Spouse: Charlotte Anna Campbell (m. 1849)
- Relations: Orlando Strange, brother

Maxwell William Strange (March 22, 1820 – September 28, 1880) was an Ontario lawyer and political figure. He represented Kingston in the Legislative Assembly of Ontario from 1867 to 1871 as a Conservative member.

He was born in Kingston in 1820, the son of John Strange who represented Frontenac in the Upper Canada assembly. Served in the Kingston Volunteer Rifles during the Rebellion of 1837. Afterwards lieutenant colonel in the Canadian Militia, commanded the Cavalry-No.3 Military District and then the Cavalry and Rifles in Kingston. Strange was called to the bar in 1845. In 1849, he married Charlotte Anna, the daughter of Dr. James Campbell and sister of Sir Alexander Campbell, Lieutenant-Governor of Ontario, 1887. In 1854, he ran unsuccessfully in Frontenac for a seat in the legislative assembly for the Province of Canada. He defeated doctor John Stewart for the seat in the provincial assembly in 1867. Strange was also a justice of the peace, a police magistrate and vice-president of the Commercial Bank. Father of seven.

His brother Orlando Sampson was a doctor and served as mayor of Kingston.

== Electoral history ==
1867 Ontario general election: Kingston
Party	Candidate	Votes	%
Conservative	Maxwell W. Strange	705	84.63
Liberal	John Stewart	128	15.37
Total valid votes		833	37.14
Eligible voters		2,243	
Conservative pickup new district.			
Source: Elections Ontario
