= William Folger Nickle =

Canadian politician (1869–1957)

William Folger Nickle, KC
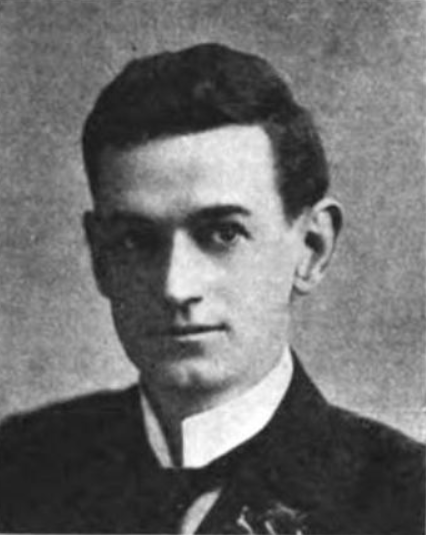

Member of Parliament for Kingston
- In office 1911–1919
- Preceded by: William Harty
- Succeeded by: Henry Lumley Drayton

Ontario MPP
- In office 1922–1926
- Preceded by: Arthur Edward Ross
- Succeeded by: Thomas Ashmore Kidd
- In office 1908–1911
- Preceded by: Edward John Barker Pense
- Succeeded by: Arthur Edward Ross
- Constituency: Kingston

Personal details
- Born: 31 December 1869 Kingston, Ontario, Canada
- Died: 15 November 1957 (aged 87)
- Party: Conservative
- Spouses: Agnes Mary McAdam (m. 1885–1910) Katherine Louise Gorden (m. 1911)
- Relations: William McAdam Nickle, son
- Children: William McAdam Nickle
- Occupation: Lawyer

William Folger Nickle KC (31 December 1869 – 15 November 1957) was a Canadian politician who served both as a member of the House of Commons of Canada and in the Ontario legislature where he rose to the position of Attorney-General of Ontario. He is best known for the Nickle Resolution that ended the practice of knighthoods and peerages being awarded to Canadians.

Born in Kingston, Ontario, the son of William Nickle, Nickle was educated at Queen's University and Osgoode Hall. He was called to the Ontario bar in 1896 and set up a law practice in Kingston. He entered local politics and was elected to the school board 1904 and then served on Kingston city council from 1905 until 1908.

He was first elected to the Legislative Assembly of Ontario in the 1908 provincial election as a Conservative and served for three years until his election to the federal House of Commons in the 1911 federal election, as the Conservative Member of Parliament (MP) for Kingston. He was re-elected in the 1917 federal election as a Unionist.

Nickle was appointed to chair a special committee of the House of Commons to examine the question of the appointment of honours. There had been criticism in the press about a surfeit of knighthoods being created during World War I. In 1919, Nickle moved and had passed through the House a resolution calling for an end to the practice of Canadians being granted knighthoods and peerages. Nickle's detractors charged that he was bitter at having failed to get a knighthood for his father-in-law.

Later that year, he resigned his federal seat contending that the wartime Union Government should also resign and seek a post-war mandate to govern. Nickle returned to provincial politics and won a seat in the Ontario legislature in a 1922 by-election.

The Conservatives formed government following the 1923 provincial election. The new Premier of Ontario, George Howard Ferguson, appointed Nickle to cabinet as Attorney-General of Ontario. Nickle resigned from Cabinet in October 1926 when Premier Ferguson announced his plan to repeal the Ontario Temperance Act and allow liquor sales. He ran as an Independent on a prohibition platform in the subsequent 1926 provincial election but was defeated in the riding of Kingston and Portsmouth by the Conservative candidate, Thomas Kidd.

He married Agnes Mary McAdam in 1885 and married Katherine Louise Gorden in 1911 after the death of his first wife. Nickle served on the city council for Kingston, also serving as a member of the school board, and was a trustee for Queen's University and a member of the board of governors for Kingston Hospital.

William McAdam Nickle, a son from his first marriage, went on to serve in the Ontario cabinet.
