= Arthur Edward Ross =

Canadian politician (1870–1952)

Member of Parliament for Kingston City
- In office 1925–1935
- Preceded by: New riding
- Succeeded by: Norman McLeod Rogers

Member of Parliament for Kingston
- In office 1922–1925
- Preceded by: Henry Lumley Drayton
- Succeeded by: Riding abolished

Ontario MPP
- In office 1911–1922
- Preceded by: William Folger Nickle
- Succeeded by: William Folger Nickle
- Constituency: Kingston

Personal details
- Born: June 9, 1870 Cobden, Ontario
- Died: November 15, 1952
- Party: Conservative
- Spouse: Mabel Parker (m. 1902) married Anne Stinson second wife after Mabel died

Arthur Edward Ross (June 9, 1870 – November 15, 1952) was a Canadian physician and political figure in Ontario. He represented Kingston in the Legislative Assembly of Ontario from 1911 to 1921 and represented Kingston and then Kingston City in the House of Commons of Canada from 1921 to 1935 as a Conservative member.

He was born in Cobden, Ontario, the son of John Ross. Ross was educated at Queen's University and the University of Edinburgh. In 1902, he married Mabel Parker. Ross served on the city council for Kingston, serving as mayor in 1908. In the same year, he ran unsuccessfully for a seat in the House of Commons. He served briefly in the provincial cabinet as Minister Without Portfolio from September to November 1919 and resigned in 1921 to enter federal politics. He married Anne Ethel Stinson on January 24, 1923. He was elected to the Canadian House of Commons in the 1921 federal election and was re-elected several times until he was defeated in a bid for reelection in 1935.

Ross served during the Second Boer War. He was an officer in the 1st Canadian Field Ambulance during World War I, reaching the rank of Lieutenant-Colonel, and later served as Director of Medical Services for the Canadian Expeditionary Force, serving as a Brigadier-General. Ross was credited with being the first to find measures to combat "trench foot" and the effects of mustard gas, as well as being the first to use light relays to evacuate the wounded.

Ross was rector for Queen's University from 1920 to 1924.

== Archives ==
There is an Arthur Edward Ross fonds at Library and Archives Canada. Archival reference number is R2003.
