= William Jaques =

Canadian politician

Ontario MPP
- In office 1914 – 1919
- Preceded by: Christian Kohler
- Succeeded by: Warren Stringer
- Constituency: Haldimand

Personal details
- Born: May 3, 1861 Walpole Township, Haldimand County, Canada West
- Died: June 27, 1927 (aged 66) Wentworth County, Ontario
- Party: Conservative
- Spouse: Zeatta Seatter
- Profession: Physician

William Jaques (May 3, 1861 – June 27, 1927) was an Ontario physician and political figure. He represented Haldimand in the Legislative Assembly of Ontario from 1914 to 1919 as a Conservative member.

He was born in Walpole Township, Haldimand County, Canada West, the son of Anthony Jaques who was descended from Huguenots who settled in England. Jaques was educated at the Toronto School of Medicine and set up practice in Jarvis. In 1888, he married Zetta Seatter. Jaques ran unsuccessfully against Christian Kohler in 1911 for the provincial seat before he was elected in 1914. He was defeated in 1919 by Warren Stringer of the United Farmers of Ontario. He died June 27, 1927.
