= William Robinson (Ontario politician) =

Canadian politician

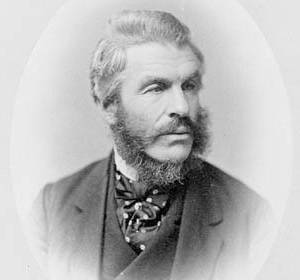

Ontario MPP
- In office 1871–1879
- Preceded by: Maxwell W. Strange
- Succeeded by: James Henry Metcalfe
- Constituency: Kingston

Personal details
- Born: November 5, 1823 Ballymoney, County Antrim, Ireland
- Died: July 21, 1912 (aged 88)
- Party: Independent, Liberal
- Spouse: Margaret Dick (m. 1850)
- Children: 7

William Robinson (November 5, 1823 – July 21, 1912) was an Ontario businessman and political figure. He way mayor of Kingston for the 1869 and 1870 terms, and was elected to represent Kingston in the Legislative Assembly of Ontario in 1871 as an independent and reelected in 1875 as a Liberal.

== Private Life ==
Robinson was born in Ballymoney, County Antrim, Ireland, in 1823. He married Margaret Dick, daughter of David Dick. She had come to Canada from County Down, Ireland in 1840 with her parents. On September 15, 1850. She was also an Irish immigrant. The wedding was officiated by Reverend Reid in Cooke's Presbyterian Church. He had four sons and three daughters. He died on July 21, 1912. His obituary was published in the Daily British Whig on July 22, 1912.

== Public Service ==
=== Kingston local politics ===
He served on the Kingston town council in several positions for over 38 years, including being the Alderman for the Rideau Ward, Mayor for the 1869 and 1870 terms, and as the Alderman for the Cataraqui Ward in 1897.

While in office, he was responsible for exposing the corruption of the City Chamberlain and the Tax Collectors by exposing that a sum reaching nearly $16,000.00 was missing from city accounts.

=== Member of the Ontario Legislative Assembly ===
Robinson entered Ontario politics in the 1871 local election (as provincial elections were then called), campaigned as an independent with the support of prominent figures from both the local Conservative and Liberal circles. His primary opponent was John Breden, his mayoral predecessor who also professed to be an independent and declared his politics to be ‘chiefly Railways, Railways’. The Liberal promoting Globe however derided Breden as a ministerialist (i.e. in support of the incumbent Conservative ministry the Patent Combination) and gave Robinson positive coverage both before and after the election.

While Robinson pleaded to support the incumbent ministry's railway policy, and Sandfield Macdonald initially included him among the ‘doubtful’ members whom he hoped to lure to his side, his partisan leaning toward the Liberals was quickly evident. When the second Ontario Parliament finally convened nine months after the election, Robinson voted with the Liberal in all five recorded divisions expressing lack of confidence in the incumbent Conservative ministry. Once the Liberals assumed power, Robinson was honoured at local Liberals events in celebration of the new Blake ministry, and was prominently featured in grand Liberal gala in Toronto. His support for the party strengthen even further when his old friend Mowat assumed party leadership, and he contested 1875 election explicitly as a Liberal candidate, with Mowat personally coming to Kingston to stump for him days before the election. Post election reporting by all news outlets regardless of leaning listed him as a ministerialist in support of the Mowat ministry.

The erroneous conservative classification of Robinson in many official records can be traced to his listings in the usually authoritative reference annual Canadian Parliamentary Companion, which mislabelled him with this self-conflict description: "(a) Conservative, and a strong supporter of the Mowat Administration". His listing also erroneously listed him as president of the non-existent "Kingston and Marmora Railway", likely conflating it with the Kingston & Pembroke Railway, which Robinson was instrumental in secured a $121,000.00 bond toward the building of it.

He was defeated in the 1879 election.

Robinson once said that he had only cast one Tory vote in his life, and that was when two conservatives were running in Frontenac County. "Of two evils, I chose the lesser".

=== Later public service ===
He worked as a painter for over thirty years before retiring and taking an appointment as Clerk of the Division Court, where he stayed for eleven years. His son William then took over the post.

He was later appointed a customs officer at Kingston.

Robinson was a Justice of Peace for over forty years, but when the Tories were brought into Toronto in 1905 they relieved him from the post.

== Electoral history ==
1871 Ontario general election: Kingston
Party	Candidate	Votes	%	
Independent	William Robinson	607	50.04	
Independent	Mr. Breden	586	48.31	
Independent	John Stewart	20	1.65	
Turnout		1,213	58.21	+21.07
Eligible voters		2,084		
Source for vote: "Data Explorer". Elections Ontario. 1871. Contemporanous news report indicate Robinson sought election in 1871 as am independent and became firmly a part of the Liberal/Reform Party soon after the election and campaign as a Liberal in subsequent elections.

1875 Ontario general election: Kingston
Party	Candidate	Votes	%
Liberal	William Robinson	935	54.17
Liberal–Conservative	James McCammon	791	45.83
Turnout		1,726	64.55
Eligible voters		2,674	
Source for vote tally: "Data Explorer". Elections Ontario. 1875. Contemporaneous news reporting consistently identified Robinson as having sought re-election as a liberal, with Liberal leader Mowat personally stumping for him in Kingston days before the election.

1879 Ontario general election: Kingston
Party	Candidate	Votes	%	±%
Conservative	James Henry Metcalfe	955	55.82	+9.99
Liberal	William Robinson	756	44.18	-9.99
Total valid votes		1,711	59.53	−5.01
Eligible voters		2,874		
Conservative gain		Swing		+9.99
Source: Elections Ontario
