= Byron Moffatt Britton =

Canadian politician

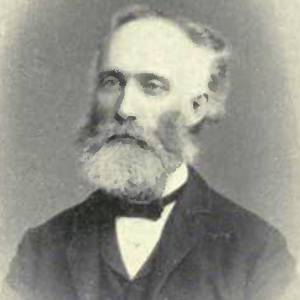

Member of the Canadian Parliament for Kingston
- In office 1896–1901
- Preceded by: James Metcalfe
- Succeeded by: William Harty

Personal details
- Born: September 3, 1833 Gananoque, Upper Canada
- Died: November 19, 1920 (aged 87)
- Party: Liberal
- Occupation: lawyer, lecturer

Byron Moffatt Britton (September 3, 1833 – November 19, 1920) was a Canadian politician, lawyer and lecturer. He was elected to the House of Commons of Canada in the 1896 election to represent the riding of Kingston. He was re-elected in 1900.

The son of Daniel Britton and Nancy Moffatt, both Americans who had come to Upper Canada, he was educated at Victoria University in Cobourg, studied law in Toronto and Belleville and was called to the bar in 1859. Britton set up practice in Kingston. In 1875, he was named Queen's Counsel. He was Crown Attorney for Frontenac county from 1883 to 1891. Britton also served on the board of governors for Kingston General Hospital. In 1863, he married Mary E., the daughter of Luther Hamilton Holton.

Prior to his federal experience, he was a councillor, then mayor of Kingston, Ontario (1876–1877). He was appointed Judge of the Court of King's Bench for Ontario on September 24, 1901. Britton presided over the 1911 Angelina Napolitano case.
