= Kingston City =

Former federal electoral district in Ontario, Canada

Ontario electoral district

Defunct federal electoral district
- Legislature: House of Commons
- District created: 1924
- District abolished: 1952
- First contested: 1925
- Last contested: 1949

Kingston City was a federal electoral district represented in the House of Commons of Canada from 1925 to 1953. It was located in the province of Ontario. This riding was created in 1924 from parts of Kingston riding.

It consisted of the city of Kingston, Ontario, and the village of Portsmouth.

The electoral district was abolished in 1952 when it was merged into Kingston riding.

== Members of Parliament ==
This riding elected the following members of the House of Commons of Canada:

Parliament	Years	Member	Party
Riding created from Kingston
15th	1925–1926	Arthur Edward Ross	Conservative
16th	1926–1930	Arthur Edward Ross	Conservative
17th	1930–1935	Arthur Edward Ross	Conservative
18th	1935–1940	Norman McLeod Rogers	Liberal
19th	1940–1940†	Norman McLeod Rogers	Liberal
19th	1940–1945	Angus Lewis Macdonald	Liberal
20th	1945–1949	Thomas Kidd	Progressive Conservative
21st	1949–1953	William Henderson	Liberal
Riding dissolved into Kingston

== Election results ==
1925 Canadian federal election
Party	Candidate	Votes
Conservative	Arthur Edward Ross	6,765
Liberal	John Murdoch Campbell	5,004

1926 Canadian federal election
Party	Candidate	Votes
Conservative	Arthur Edward Ross	6,256
Liberal	James Halliday	4,174

1930 Canadian federal election
Party	Candidate	Votes
Conservative	Arthur Edward Ross	6,539
Liberal	James Halliday	4,771
Source: lop.parl.ca

1935 Canadian federal election
Party	Candidate	Votes
Liberal	Norman McLeod Rogers	6,897
Conservative	Arthur Edward Ross	5,979
Co-operative Commonwealth	John Alfred Compton	373

1940 Canadian federal election
Party	Candidate	Votes
Liberal	Norman McLeod Rogers	9,609
National Government	Thomas Kidd	7,475

Canadian federal by-election, August 12, 1940 Death of Norman McLeod Rogers
Party	Candidate	Votes
Liberal	Angus Lewis Macdonald	acclaimed

1945 Canadian federal election
Party	Candidate	Votes
Progressive Conservative	Thomas Kidd	9,175
Liberal	Hugh Plaxton	7,588
Co-operative Commonwealth	William George Leonard	1,271

1949 Canadian federal election
Party	Candidate	Votes
Liberal	William Henderson	10,045
Progressive Conservative	Thomas Kidd	7,831
Co-operative Commonwealth	Henry Lennox Cartwright	786

== See also ==
- List of Canadian electoral districts
- Historical federal electoral districts of Canada
