= Richard Nixon Berry =

Canadian politician

Ontario MPP
- In office 1929–1934
- Preceded by: Robert Francis Miller
- Succeeded by: Riding abolished
- In office 1923–1929
- Preceded by: Warren Stringer
- Succeeded by: Robert Francis Miller
- Constituency: Haldimand

Personal details
- Born: May 3, 1873 Seneca Township, Ontario
- Died: September 17, 1956 (aged 83) Hamilton, Ontario
- Party: Conservative
- Spouse: Harriette Esther Hind (m. 1904)
- Occupation: Dentist

Richard Nixon Berry (May 3, 1873 – September 17, 1956) was a Canadian dentist and political figure in Ontario. He represented Haldimand in the Legislative Assembly of Ontario from 1923 to 1926 and from 1929 to 1934 as a Conservative member.

He was born in Seneca township, the son of Nixon Berry and Eliza Jane Hassard. Berry was educated in Caledonia and at the Royal College of Dental Surgeons. In 1904, he married Harriette Esther Hind. Berry served as reeve for Caledonia from 1920 to 1923 and as warden for Haldimand County in 1923. He died in Hamilton in 1956.
