= Alexander Gunn (politician) =

Canadian politician (1828–1907)

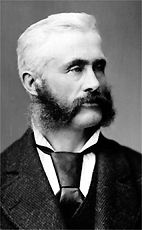

Member of the Canadian Parliament for Kingston
- In office 1878–1887
- Preceded by: John A. Macdonald
- Succeeded by: John A. Macdonald

Personal details
- Born: October 5, 1828 Burns, Caithness, Scotland
- Died: September 26, 1907 (aged 78) Kingston, Ontario, Canada
- Party: Liberal
- Occupation: grocery wholesaler

Alexander Gunn (October 5, 1828 – September 26, 1907) was a Scottish grocery wholesaler who immigrated to Canada and was elected to the House of Commons of Canada in the 1878 election defeating incumbent Leader of the Opposition Sir John A. Macdonald. He was re-elected in 1882 then lost in 1887 and again in 1891 to Macdonald.

In 1864, he married Angelique Agnes Matthews, daughter of Robert Matthews and Angelique Valliere of Quebec. They had four sons and two daughters, their descendants include various Canadian and British military and diplomatic figures.
