= Norman McLeod Rogers =

Canadian politician

The Honourable Norman McLeod Rogers PC MP
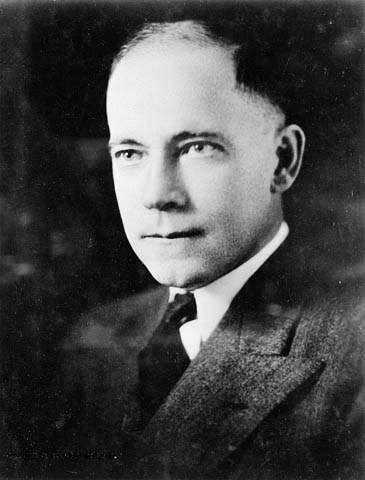

Minister of National Defence
- In office September 19, 1939 – June 10, 1940
- Prime Minister: W. L. Mackenzie King
- Preceded by: Ian Alistair Mackenzie
- Succeeded by: Charles Power

Minister of Labour
- In office October 23, 1935 – September 18, 1939
- Prime Minister: W. L. Mackenzie King
- Preceded by: Wesley Ashton Gordon
- Succeeded by: Norman Alexander McLarty

Member of Parliament for Kingston City
- In office October 14, 1935 – June 10, 1940
- Preceded by: Arthur Edward Ross
- Succeeded by: Angus Lewis Macdonald

Personal details
- Born: July 25, 1894 Amherst, Nova Scotia, Canada
- Died: June 10, 1940 (aged 45) near Newtonville, Ontario, Canada
- Party: Liberal
- Spouse: Mary Francis Parker Kierstead (m. 1924)
- Children: 2

Military service
- Allegiance: Canada
- Branch/service: Canadian Expeditionary Force
- Years of service: 1914–1918
- Rank: Lieutenant

Norman McLeod Rogers PC MP (July 25, 1894 – June 10, 1940) was a Canadian lawyer and statesman. He served as the Member of Parliament for Kingston, Ontario, Canada and as a cabinet minister in the government of Prime Minister William Lyon Mackenzie King. He was also an early biographer of King.

Rogers was born in Amherst, Nova Scotia, and served in the military during World War I. He was educated at Acadia University and in 1919 he was elected a Rhodes Scholar. He went to University College, Oxford, where he was awarded a BA Honours (MA) degree in Modern History, the B.Litt., and the BCL.

Rogers was private secretary to King from 1927 to 1929, then worked as a professor at Queen's University in Kingston. He was elected to the Parliament in 1935, and served under King as Minister of Labour until 1939, and then Minister of National Defence from 1939 until his death in 1940.

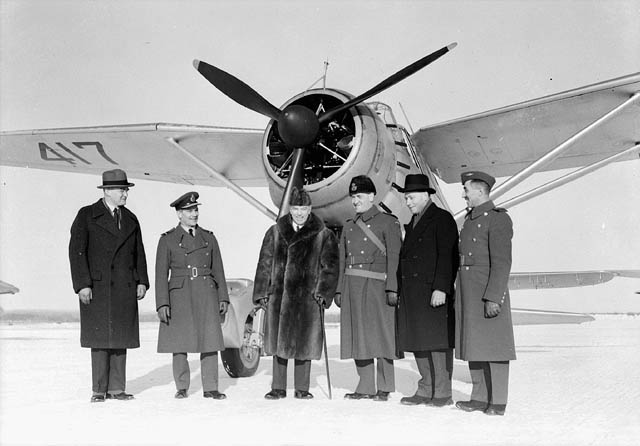
Rt. Hon. W.L. Mackenzie King inspecting No. 110 (City of Toronto) Squadron, R.C.A.F. The aircraft in the background is Westland 'Lysander' II 417. [L-R]: Hon. T.A. Crerar, Air Marshal G.M. Croil, Rt. Hon. W.L. Mackenzie King, W/C W.D. Van Vliet, Hon. Norman Rogers, 13 January 1940.

Rogers died in a plane crash on June 10, 1940, near Newtonville, Ontario, while en route from Ottawa to Toronto for a speaking engagement. On the day National Defence Minister Rogers died, Canada declared war on Italy.

Prime Minister King took the death of Rogers extremely hard. Rogers was a key Cabinet minister, and close advisor, and Canada was in the midst of World War II. The two men were friendly on a personal basis, and King may have been grooming Rogers to become his successor as prime minister.

Kingston/Norman Rogers Airport is named in his honour, as is a street in Kingston. A Canadian Coast Guard icebreaker was named after him; it has since been sold to Chile and renamed Contraalmirante Oscar Viel Toro.

== Bibliography ==
- W. A. M., 'Obituary: Norman McLeod Rogers, 1894–1940', Canadian Journal of Economics and Political Science/Revue canadienne d'Economique et de Science politique, vol. 6, no. 3 (August, 1940), pp. 476–478
- Barry Cahill (2022) The Life and Death of Norman McLeod Rogers, Newcastle UK: Cambridge Scholars Publishing.
