= John Senn (Ontario politician) =

Canadian politician

Member of the Ontario Provincial Parliament for Haldimand
- In office June 26, 1894 – January 28, 1898
- Preceded by: Jacob Baxter
- Succeeded by: Jacob Baxter

Personal details
- Party: Conservative

John Senn was a Canadian politician from Ontario. He was elected to the Legislative Assembly of Ontario in Haldimand in the 1894 Ontario general election until 1898 when his election was declared void.

== See also ==
- 8th Parliament of Ontario
