= Harry Allan Stewart =

Canadian politician

Ontario MPP
- In office 1943–1951
- Preceded by: Thomas Ashmore Kidd
- Succeeded by: William McAdam Nickle
- Constituency: Kingston

Personal details
- Born: July 11, 1892 Ash, Ontario
- Died: February 22, 1970 (aged 77) Kingston, Ontario
- Party: Progressive Conservative
- Occupation: Dentist

Harry Allan Stewart (July 11, 1892 – February 22, 1970) was a dentist and politician in Ontario, Canada. He represented Kingston in the Legislative Assembly of Ontario from 1943 to 1951 as a Progressive Conservative.

The son of Thomas Henry Stewart and Elizabeth Allan, both natives of Scotland, he was born in Ash, Ontario and was educated in Kingston and at the University of Toronto. In 1916, Stewart married Hazel Victoria Greenwood. He served in the Canadian Army Dental Corps from 1916 to 1921. He was a member of Kingston city council from 1932 to 1936 and served as mayor of Kingston from 1938 to 1943. Stewart was also chair of the local Board of Education.

He was an older brother of Boston Bruins goaltender Charles Stewart.
