= Jacob Kohler (Ontario politician) =

Canadian politician

Ontario MPP
- In office 1905–1911
- Preceded by: Joseph William Holmes
- Succeeded by: Christian Kohler
- Constituency: Haldimand

Personal details
- Born: October 27, 1860 Kohler, Haldimand County, Canada West
- Died: January 19, 1934 (aged 73) Niagara Falls, Ontario
- Party: Liberal
- Spouse: Sarah J. Parsons (m. 1885)
- Occupation: Farmer

Jacob Kohler (October 27, 1860 – January 19, 1934) was an Ontario farmer and political figure. He represented Haldimand in the Legislative Assembly of Ontario from 1905 to 1911 as a Liberal member.

He was born in Kohler, Haldimand County, Canada West in 1860, the son of Martin Kohler. In 1885, he married Sarah J. Parsons. He was a livestock dealer, in partnership with his brother Christian, who also later served in the provincial assembly. Kohler was reeve of North Cayuga Township and also served as warden for Haldimand County. He died in 1934.
