= Edward H. Smythe =

Canadian politician

Member of the Ontario Provincial Parliament for Kingston
- In office June 26, 1894 – January 28, 1898
- Preceded by: William Harty
- Succeeded by: William Harty

Personal details
- Party: Conservative

Edward H. Smythe was a Canadian politician from Ontario. He represented Kingston in the Legislative Assembly of Ontario from 1894 to 1898 when his election was declared void.

== See also ==
- 8th Parliament of Ontario
