= James Henry Metcalfe =

Canadian politician

Member of Parliament for Kingston
- In office 1892–1896
- Preceded by: John A. Macdonald
- Succeeded by: Byron Moffatt Britton

Ontario MPP
- In office 1879–1892
- Preceded by: William Robinson
- Succeeded by: William Harty
- Constituency: Kingston

Personal details
- Born: January 8, 1848 Kingston, Canada West
- Died: January 25, 1925 (aged 77)
- Party: Conservative

James Henry Metcalfe (January 8, 1848 – January 1, 1925) was a Canadian businessman and political figure. He represented Kingston in the Legislative Assembly of Ontario from 1879 to 1892 and Kingston in the House of Commons of Canada from 1892 to 1896 as a Conservative member.

He was born in Kingston, Canada West in 1848, the son of John Metcalfe, who came to Kingston from Yorkshire, England. In 1869, he married Margaret Jane Clute. Metcalfe was a public school teacher in Kingston and later became an auctioneer. He served six years on the Kingston city council. Metcalfe resigned his seat in the provincial assembly in 1892 after being elected to the federal parliament. He ran unsuccessfully for the federal seat in 1902. Metcalfe served as Dominion Commissioner of Immigration for the North-West Territories and was warden of the Kingston Penitentiary from 1896 to 1899.

== Electoral history ==
1879 Ontario general election: Kingston
Party	Candidate	Votes	%	±%
Conservative	James Henry Metcalfe	955	55.82	+9.99
Liberal	William Robinson	756	44.18	-9.99
Total valid votes		1,711	59.53	−5.01
Eligible voters		2,874		
Conservative gain		Swing		+9.99
Source: Elections Ontario
