= Joseph William Holmes =

Canadian politician

Ontario MPP
- In office 1898–1904
- Preceded by: Jacob Baxter
- Succeeded by: Jacob Kohler
- Constituency: Haldimand

Personal details
- Born: July 4, 1842 Selkirk, Ontario, Canada
- Died: August 24, 1926 (aged 84)
- Party: Liberal
- Occupation: Farmer

Joseph William Holmes (July 4, 1842 – August 24, 1926) was a farmer and politician in Ontario, Canada. He represented Haldimand in the Legislative Assembly of Ontario from 1898 to 1904 as a Liberal.

The son of William Holmes and Mary Hoover, he was born in Selkirk, Canada. Holmes served nine years as reeve of Rainham township and ten years as reeve of Walpole township. He also served on the council for Haldimand County.
