= Christian Kohler =

Canadian politician

Ontario MPP
- In office 1911–1914
- Preceded by: Jacob Kohler
- Succeeded by: William Jaques
- Constituency: Haldimand

Personal details
- Born: 1859 Kohler, Haldimand County, Canada West
- Died: 1926 (aged 66–67) Hamilton, Ontario
- Party: Liberal
- Spouse: Barbara Nie (m. 1884)
- Occupation: Farmer

Christian Kohler (1859 - 1926) was a Canadian farmer and politician in Ontario. He represented Haldimand in the Legislative Assembly of Ontario as a Liberal member from 1911 to 1914.

He was born in Kohler, Haldimand County, Canada West, the son of Martin Kohler, a German immigrant. He was a livestock dealer in partnership with his brother Jacob. Kohler succeeded his brother as representative for Haldimand in the provincial assembly. He married Barbara Nie in 1884.
