= Edward John Barker =

Edward John Barker (31 December 1799 – 27 April 1884) was an English medical doctor and journalist who worked for much of his life in Canada.

Barker was born in England, lived for a time in South Carolina, and then returned to England, where he successfully practised as a physician and in medicine for a number of years.

In 1832, after emigrating to Upper Canada with his family, he settled in Kingston, Ontario. Barker continued in medical practice but developed an interest in journalism. In 1834 he founded the then semi-weekly British Whig. The newspaper, now the Kingston Whig-Standard, became the longest continually published newspaper in Canada.
