= Benjamin Allmark =

Canadian politician

Member of Parliament for Kingston
- In office 1958–1962
- Preceded by: William James Henderson
- Succeeded by: Edgar Benson

Personal details
- Born: Benjamin Graydon Allmark; June 1, 1911 Kingston, Ontario, Canada
- Died: January 4, 2004 (aged 92) Victoria, British Columbia, Canada
- Party: Progressive Conservative
- Profession: planning supervisor, superintendent

Benjamin Graydon Allmark (June 1, 1911 – January 4, 2004) was a Canadian politician, planning supervisor and superintendent. He was elected to the House of Commons of Canada as a member of the Progressive Conservatives for the riding of Kingston in the 1958 election and defeated in the 1962 election. He had a seat in the house of commons for the 24th Canadian Parliament, when John Diefenbaker was prime minister.

He worked as a sailor for Canada Steamship Lines for 11 years, rising to first mate. He was an alderman for Kingston City Council before that. Then at the Kingston operations of Alcan becoming a manager.

Allmark moved to Victoria, British Columbia in 1976. He died there in 2004, aged 92.
