= Orlando Strange =

Orlando Sampson Strange (June 13, 1826 – January 2, 1906) was a physician and politician in Ontario, Canada. He served as mayor of Kingston from 1859 to 1860.

He was born in Kingston and is the son of Mary McGill and John Strange, who was a native of Scotland. He was educated at Queen's College. He studied medicine with Doctor James Sampson and completed his medical studies at the University of New York. Strange then set up practice in Kingston. He also served as surgeon for the Kingston General Hospital. He was a member of Kingston City Council from 1852 to 1854 and also served as chair of the school board. He was a member of the board of governors for the Kingston General Hospital. In 1849, Strange married Ann Emily Maclean.

His brother Maxwell served in the Ontario assembly. In 1847, the two brothers bought the Calderwood House in Kingston from Thomas Kirkpatrick.

Strange died in Kingston at the age of 79.
