= William Henderson (Canadian politician) =

Canadian politician

William J. Henderson

Member of Parliament for Kingston City
- In office June 1949 – August 1953
- Preceded by: Thomas Kidd
- Succeeded by: District redistributed

Member of Parliament for Kingston
- In office August 1953 – March 1958
- Preceded by: District created
- Succeeded by: Edgar Benson

Personal details
- Born: William James Orton Henderson; 13 October 1916 Empress, Alberta, Canada
- Died: 15 May 2006 (aged 89) Kingston, Ontario, Canada
- Party: Liberal
- Spouse: Helen MacDougall (m. 1943–1982, her death)
- Profession: barrister, judge, lawyer

William James Orton Henderson MBE (13 October 1916 – 15 May 2006) was a Liberal party member of the House of Commons of Canada. He was born in Empress, Alberta and became a soldier, barrister, lawyer and Supreme Court of Ontario judge.

== Lawyer ==
He studied at Queen's University and graduated with a Bachelor of Arts degree in 1938. In 1942, he was formally installed as a lawyer after graduating from Osgoode Hall Law School. During this time, he also served in the Canadian Forces from 1939, including some service in World War II, joining the Royal Canadian Corps of Signals in 1942 before his discharge in 1946. He remained a reservist until 1952. He was made a Member of the Order of the British Empire (MBE) for his work in re-establishing a functioning judicial system in the Netherlands following World War II.

== Politician ==
Henderson was first elected at the Kingston City riding in the 1949 general election as a Liberal backbencher. After a redistribution of electoral districts, Henderson was re-elected for successive Parliamentary terms in at the Kingston riding in the 1953 and 1957 elections. He was defeated in the 1958 election by Benjamin Allmark of the Progressive Conservative party.

== Judge ==
In 1965, he was appointed a judge of the Supreme Court of Ontario. In 1971, he was the presiding judge at the trial of the "Kingston Thirteen" which began on 28 October 1971. The 13 accused were on trial for a torture-murder session held on the night of 17–18 April 1971 during the Kingston Penitentiary riot and were charged with first degree murder for the deaths of Brian Ensor and Bertrand Robert. The "Kingston 13" trial attracted much media attention and the courtroom was packed full of university students who come to show their support for the accused. Henderson was unhappy with the hippie appearance of the students and told the courtroom that he would not allow his courtroom to became "a haven for bums" and that "if people haven't' got decent clothes to put on, there are social agencies they can go to for assistance". He ordered the court bailiffs to turn away from the courtroom visitor's gallery people who not properly dressed in his opinion as he made clear his distaste for hippies. Henderson oversaw the selection of the 12 person jury for the trial, and ended up with a jury made up of 12 middle aged, middle class white men. He told that the jury that this was going to be a difficult trial and to brace themselves for what was to come. Henderson took upon himself to pressure both the Crown attorneys and the defense lawyers to reach a deal for a plea bargain to give the "Kingston 13" light prison sentences. On the third week of the trial, Henderson invited the defense counsel and the Crown Attorneys to go to lunch with him, saying: "There's nothing like the companionship of other lawyers to change minds". On 18 November 1971 and again on 19 November, Henderson chaired secret meetings in a cheap motel room attended by the 2 Crown attorneys and the 16 defense counsel about the reaching a deal. The second meeting ended with the Crown counsel saying that they thought that the "Kingston 13" should all serve sentences between 3–5 years for their crimes, an offer that the defense counsel all accepted as their clients were facing life imprisonment if convicted of first degree murder.

The trial ended on 22 November 1971 in a plea bargain with 12 of the accused pleading guilty to manslaughter while Brian Beaucage, the leader of the gang, pleaded guilty to assault causing bodily harm. In a summary given to the jury where he urged them to accept the plea bargain, Henderson stated that the victims of the torture session were the "undesirables" (prisoner slang for child killers, rapists, and child molesters). As such he stated "I doubt if an ordinary man would have had his stability and control". Henderson argued that the mere sight of the "undesirables" led to a natural and understandable desire for the other prisoners to want to torture them, but that he saw no evidence that Beaucage and his followers had planned to kill the "undesirables". Henderson's recommendation was accepted by the jury. Henderson's statements to the jury to the effect that the "undesirables" had gotten what they deserved and that the "Kingston 13" were some sort of heroes were highly controversial in 1971 and have remained so. When sentencing Glen Morris, the prisoner whom several of the Crown's witnesses accused of drinking the blood of Ensor, Henderson asked of him "You'll be a good boy from now on?" Henderson's tone towards Morris, which he suggested he viewed him as simply a slightly naughty child instead of a man who had tortured another man to death was felt to be inappropriate and seemed to take Morris by surprise as he expected the judge to be more critical of his actions. The outcome of the "Kingston 13" trial was widely considered to be a "complete miscarriage of justice" as the gang led by Beaucage had tortured the "undesirables" and had killed two of them.

On 13 December 1971, the journalist Michael Valpy in an article in the Globe & Mail exposed the secret deal brokered by Henderson, which added to the controversy with many feeling that Henderson had gone out of his way to give the "Kingston 13" light prison sentences. Furthermore, judges are expected to be neutral and impartial, and many felt that Henderson had acted wrongly in taking the lead in starting the talks for plea bargain to end the trial. In a frontpage story in the Globe & Mail, which featured a photograph of Henderson in his judicial robes was the headline "Secret Deal Settled Kingston trial. Rioters' sentences decided in chambers". Henderson refused to do an interview in person about his actions, but in a telephone interview with a reporter from The Toronto Daily Star claimed "I was not party to any deal". Henderson stated that the two secret meetings at the motel were mere "courtesies". Clayton Ruby, one of the defense lawyers told the media: "I'm rather amazed that anyone should find what occurred at the Kingston trial to be in any way improper or unusual". Somewhat contradicting himself, Henderson defended his actions by saying that the trial of the "Kingston 13" was costing $40, 000 per week; was likely to be a very long trial that would last about 4 months; and he was simply trying to save the money for the sake of the Canadian taxpayers by brokering plea bargains. Henderson added that if convicted of first degree murder, the "Kingston 13" would have served life sentences while he had imposed short prison sentences to save the taxpayer's money. Henderson also stated that one of the accused, David Shepley, had attempted suicide as he expected to be convicted and sentenced to life imprisonment, which he found to be deeply depressing. Henderson added that had the trial lasted longer, Shepley might commit suicide and ending the trial early by giving Shepley a light prison sentence to be served concurrently with his 12-year prison sentence for armed robbery imposed in 1970 was a humane gesture designed to save Shepley's life. The plea bargains became the object of debate in the House of Commons with the former Conservative prime minister John Diefenbaker telling the House: "Normally I do not believe in harsh sentences. But in this case there are fears in penitentiaries across Canada that the sentences are so light as to constitute an invitation on the part of inmates to follow the same course of action taken by those in Kingston". The Liberal justice minister, John Turner, in response to Diefenbaker's questions stated that the federal government did not intend to appeal the verdicts in the "Kingston 13" case, saying he felt that justice had been served.

== City father ==
Henderson is also considered a founder of Amherstview, a suburban community near Kingston. The local recreation centre in Amherstview is dedicated in his name. He was also named to the Kingston and District Sports Hall of Fame in 2005. Henderson died at Kingston General Hospital on 15 May 2006, aged 89.

== Books ==
- Fogarty, Catherine (2021). Murder on the Inside The True Story of the Deadly Riot at Kingston Penitentiary. Windsor: Biblioasis. ISBN 9781771964029.
