= Thomas Kidd (Ontario politician) =

Canadian politician (1889–1973)

Thomas Ashmore Kidd
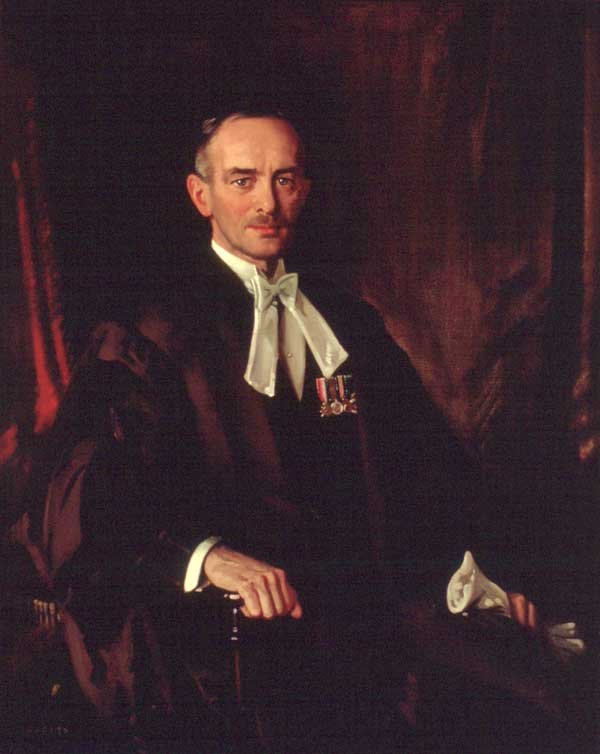

Member of Parliament for Kingston City
- In office 1945–1949
- Preceded by: Angus Lewis Macdonald
- Succeeded by: William Henderson

Ontario MPP
- In office 1926–1940
- Preceded by: William Folger Nickle
- Succeeded by: Harry Allan Stewart
- Constituency: Kingston

18th Speaker of the Legislative Assembly of Ontario
- In office 1930–1935
- Preceded by: William Black
- Succeeded by: Norman Hipel

Personal details
- Born: 1 May 1889 Burritt's Rapids, Ontario
- Died: 19 May 1973 (aged 84)
- Party: Conservative
- Spouse: Eva Richardson (m. 1920)
- Occupation: Merchant

Thomas Ashmore Kidd (1 May 1889 – 19 December 1973) was speaker of the Legislature of Ontario in 1930–34 and served as Conservative MLA for Kingston from 1926 to 1940 and Progressive Conservative MP for Kingston City from 1945 to 1949.

He was born in Burritt's Rapids, Ontario, the nephew of Edward Kidd, and was educated there and in Kemptville. Kidd was a manufacturer and wholesale merchant. He served in France with the Royal Regiment of Canada in 1915 and was wounded at Ypres. In 1920, he married Eva Richardson, the daughter of senator Henry Westman Richardson. Kidd was a member of Kingston city council from 1922 to 1926 and also served on the Kingston Board of Works. He won the Conservative nomination in Kingston after the incumbent Conservative, William Folger Nickle, resigned from the cabinet of Howard Ferguson in order to protest the government's decision to run for re-election on the platform of repealing the Ontario Temperance Act and allowing government controlled liquor sales. Kidd defeated Nickle who ran as a Prohibitionist candidate in the 1926 provincial election.

Kidd was re-elected in the 1929 provincial election and served as Speaker of the Ontario Legislative Assembly from 1930 until 1934.

He resigned from the provincial legislature to run unsuccessfully for the House of Commons of Canada in the 1940 federal election but won on his second attempt in 1945. Kidd was defeated in bid for re-election in 1949 and again when he tried to return to politics in 1957. Kidd was also a Grand Master in the Orange Lodge.
