= The Kingston Whig-Standard =

Canadian newspaper in Ontario

Kingston Whig-Standard

- Front page of the 5 June 2020 edition
- Type: Daily newspaper
- Format: Broadsheet
- Owner: Postmedia
- Editor: Jan Murphy
- Founded: 1834 (The British Whig)
- Headquarters: 6 Cataraqui Street; Kingston, Ontario; K7L 4Z7
- Circulation: 21,850 weekdays 24,008 Saturdays (as of 2011)
- ISSN: 1197-4397
- OCLC number: 933323982
- Website: www.thewhig.com

The Kingston Whig-Standard is a newspaper in Kingston, Ontario, Canada. It is published four days a week, on Tuesday and Thursday to Saturday. It publishes a mix of community, national and international news and is currently owned by Postmedia.

The Saturday edition of The Whig features a life and entertainment section, which includes a travel section, restaurant reviews, a section for kids and colour comics.

== History ==
The British Whig was founded in 1834 by Edward John Barker (1799–1884) on Kingston's Bagot Street between Brock and Princess. Barker was born in Islington, a suburb of London, on New Year's Eve, 1799, emigrating to South Carolina as a child before coming to Canada in December 1832. Barker served a short naval career, appointed as surgeon's mate on the sloop Racehorse in 1819. The next decade of his life was said to be spent as a doctor in the London district of East Smithfield, though his work may have been closer to that of an apothecary. In 1821, during his time in London, Barker married Elizabeth Phillips.

While practising medicinal arts in Kingston, he took up an offer to edit the Spectator, and after a year decided to publish his own semi-weekly Liberal-Reform paper. His medical training would also have effect on his editorials, as he encouraged sanitation to combat cholera. His political views were not extremely popular, but those opinions were turned around by Barker's efforts of advocacy of agricultural and mercantile interests. During the Rebellions of 1837–1838, Barker's press and house were attacked and damaged. Over the next few years, the Whig and Barker's editorials would begin to support a more Conservative view. From 1841 through 1844, during the time of Kingston as Canada's capital, Barker's Atheneum Press Job printing company would be busy thanks to validation from the Conservatives. Trouble would never be far for Barker as Queen's University surgeon Dr. John Stewart would start a local paper, the Argus, with the intention of "dissecting" Barker and the Whig in 1846. That same year Barker would launch an ambitious project, Barker's Canadian Monthly Magazine, a rich literary magazine but financial failure.

Despite setbacks from the Monthly and the Argus, business went well for Barker, the Whig switching to daily publication in 1849, followed by a weekly edition in 1862. The poet Charles Sangster, who had been editor for the Amherstburg Courier, returned to work at the paper in 1849, previously having been a 12-year part-timer there. In the same year, the paper began issuing the Daily British Whig, in addition to the variously semi-weekly/weekly/triweekly edition. By 1871, Barker was planning to retire, having had his grandson assisting in the managing of the paper for some years. After stepping back from the paper, Barker would be appointed Registrar of Kingston, and died 27 April 1884 of gout at his home in Barriefield.

The Whig had Joseph Grey Elliott as managing editor, and listed as president of the 94 Barrie Street offices in 1922. Elliott was born in Port Hope, and a printer's devil for the Review in Peterborough at 14. Elliott was lauded for his views on education. Elliott died in November 1949, aged 93. Between Pense's death and the next family ownership by the Davies' clan, the Whig was being published by the British Whig Publishing Company Limited. This group was made up of Elliott, Harry E. Pense, Dr. Bruce Hopkins (married to a Pense) and two other gentlemen, with Williamson as managing editor.

William Rupert Davies would then purchase the paper from the estate of Pense in April 1925. Davies was born in Wales, immigrated to Canada in the 1880s, and had owned the Renfrew Mercury prior to coming to Kingston. W. R. Davies served as president of the Canadian Press 1939–1941, as well as president of the Canadian Weekly Newspaper Association. Prior to his ownership, the Whig had lost between five and ten thousand dollars that year. Knowing that the town could not support two newspapers, Davies brought in Harry B. Muir, manager of the London Advertiser, to purchase the Kingston Standard. The Standard was created by William R. Givens in 1907, when he acquired the News and Times, which had been an amalgamation of the Kingston News and Evening Times in 1903. The two men amalgamated the papers on 1 December 1926, creating the Whig-Standard. The word "Kingston" was dropped from the name in 1973, but was reinstated in the early 1990s. The Press Publishing Company, a business controlled by Davies, Muir, and Givens, also bought the Peterborough Examiner in the 1940s, just after Davies acquired Muir's interest in the Whig after the latter's death. Givens retired in 1931, died in 1950, and a year later Rupert leaving Canada with his son Arthur stepping up as publisher. The elder Davies had sold the paper to his sons Arthur Llewellyn, Robertson and Fred R. in 1946, with Arthur L. staying on as publisher until 1969. Arthur worked at the paper from 1926, spending the last 18 years as publisher and chief executive officer.

Arnold Edinborough was the editor of the Whig-Standard starting 1954 until 1958, having met Rupert Davies' son Robertson when Robertson was editor of the Examiner, owned by Rupert. Robertson had begun editing Examiner in 1942, where he was creating and developing his Samuel Marchbanks character.

Neil Reynolds, born 1940, left the Toronto Star in 1974 to join the Whig as an editor. He soon became editor in chief, staying with the paper until 1992, when Harvey Schachter took over. The paper excelled during the 1980s under Michael Davies (son of Arthur Llewellyn) and Reynolds, winning eight National Newspaper Awards, four National Magazine Awards, three Nathan Cohen Awards for dramatic criticism and two Michener Awards for public service journalism. Prior to the Whig, Reynolds had been with the Sarnia Observer, London Free Press, and after leaving Kingston spent time at the New Brunswick Telegraph-Journal and the Saint John Times-Globe. Others who contributed to the award-winning stories include Steve Lutkis, on staff from 1989 as an editorial writer, Douglas Fethering, Literature editor from 1988 to 1992, David Pulver, a writer and editor in Entertainment and editorials from 1977, and Sylvia Barrett Wright, the medical and science reporter from 1974 to 1981.

Despite the recognition through this time, the late 1980s were difficult for the paper financially, leading Michael Davies to sell the paper. Thus ended the largest, longest independently owned paper in Canada in October 1990. The paper continues today as the oldest continuously publishing daily in Canada under the Postmedia Network of newspapers. (The first Canadian daily is the now defunct Montreal Daily Advertiser.) The Whig-Standard had a 20–25,000 circulation under the editorship of Steve Serviss and publisher Ron Laurin. It is currently overseen by Kingston native, Editor-In-Chief, Jan Murphy (2025 - present.)

== Notable staff ==
- Jack Chiang
- William Rupert Davies
- Bill Fitsell (1923–2020), Canadian sports journalist and historian

== See also ==
- List of newspapers in Canada
