= Jacob Baxter =

Canadian politician

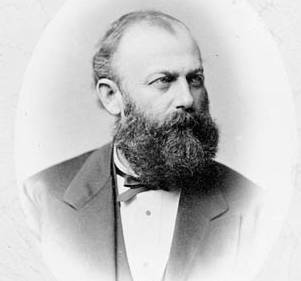

Ontario MPP
- In office 1867–1898
- Preceded by: Riding established
- Succeeded by: Joseph William Holmes
- Constituency: Haldimand

Personal details
- Born: June 6, 1832 Bertie Township in Welland County, Upper Canada
- Died: July 23, 1912 (aged 80)
- Party: Liberal
- Spouse: Rose Griffith (m. 1860)
- Occupation: Physician

Jacob Baxter (June 6, 1832 – July 23, 1912) was speaker of the Legislature of Ontario in 1887-1890 and served as Liberal MLA for Haldimand from 1867 to 1898.

He was born in Bertie Township in Welland County, Upper Canada in 1832, the son of Jacob Baxter, former reeve of Bertie. He studied medicine, received the degree of M.D. from the University of New York and the Bellevue Hospital Medical College and set up a medical practice in Cayuga in partnership with his younger brother Benjamin. He also served as justice of the peace and as surgeon for the local militia unit - 37th Haldimand Rifles. In 1860, he married Rose Griffith. He was defeated by John Senn in the 1894 general election but Senn's election was appealed and Baxter won the subsequent by-election. After retiring from politics, Baxter served as registrar for Haldimand County. He is buried in the Riverside Cemetery, Cayuga, Ontario.

== Electoral history ==
1867 Ontario general election: Haldimand
Party	Candidate	Votes	%
Liberal	Jacob Baxter	1,377	56.43
Conservative	Mr. Hurssell	1,063	43.57
Total valid votes		2,440	78.36
Eligible voters		3,114	
Liberal pickup new district.			
Source: Elections Ontario

1871 Ontario general election: Haldimand
Party	Candidate	Votes	%	±%
Liberal	Jacob Baxter	1,212	60.78	+4.35
Conservative	Mr. Amsden	782	39.22	−4.35
Turnout		1,994	59.90	−18.46
Eligible voters		3,329		
Liberal hold		Swing		+4.35
Source: Elections Ontario

1875 Ontario general election: Haldimand
Party	Candidate	Votes	%	±%
Liberal	Jacob Baxter	1,476	53.87	−6.91
Conservative	R. Waldbrook	1,264	46.13	+6.91
Turnout		2,740	75.84	+15.94
Eligible voters		3,613		
Liberal hold		Swing		−6.91
Source: Elections Ontario

1879 Ontario general election: Haldimand
Party	Candidate	Votes	%	±%
Liberal	Jacob Baxter	1,612	51.01	−2.86
Conservative	Mr. Thompson	1,548	48.99	+2.86
Total valid votes		3,160	76.44	+0.60
Eligible voters		4,134		
Liberal hold		Swing		−2.86
Source: Elections Ontario
