= Canadian titles debate =

Debate on titular honours in Canada

The Canadian titles debate originated with the presentation to the House of Commons of Canada of the Nickle Resolution in 1917. This resolution marked the earliest attempt to establish a federal government policy requesting the sovereign, in right of the United Kingdom, not to grant knighthoods, baronetcies, and peerages to Canadians and set the precedent for later policies restricting Canadians from accepting titles from foreign countries. Dissatisfaction with the British honours system led to the gradual creation of a separate system for Canada.

== The Nickle Resolution ==
The Nickle Resolution was a motion brought forward in 1917 by Conservative MP William Folger Nickle in the House of Commons of Canada. There had been controversy before the end of World War I over the honouring of Canadians—especially the appointment of Sam Hughes as a Knight Commander of the Order of the Bath (a non-hereditary honour) in 1915 and the elevation of Hugh Graham as the Baron Atholstan (a hereditary honour)—and the qualifications of recipients. Prime Minister Sir Robert Borden disapproved of the process by which Canadians were nominated for honours and, in March 1917, drafted a policy stating that all names had to be vetted by the prime minister before the list was sent to Westminster.

At the same time, Nickle alleged that the granting of hereditary titles to Canadians was itself inconsistent with democratic values. Nickle's detractors charged him with being motivated more by spite and chagrin over his failed attempt to obtain a knighthood for his father-in-law, Daniel Gordon, the principal of Queen's University in Kingston, Ontario. Regardless, Nickle successfully moved a resolution through the House calling for an address to be made to King George V requesting that he no longer grant hereditary peerages and knighthoods to Canadians and that all such titles held by Canadians become extinct upon the death of the incumbent. The motion was carried by the House of Commons, although Nickle himself voted against the version passed. It was not advanced to the Senate and no address to the King was ever made.

Beginning in 1919, the press reported on the selling of honours in the United Kingdom and there was fear that the British government would honour a large number of Canadians for their service in the First World War by appointing them to titled classes in the newly created Order of the British Empire. In that context, Nickle again put a motion forward in the lower house of Parliament, calling on the King to "hereafter be graciously pleased to refrain from conferring any titles upon your subjects domiciled or living in Canada", thus expanding the earlier resolution of 1917 to include even non-hereditary titles. The Commons voted to create a special committee to look at the question of honours. This concluded that the King should be asked to cease conferring "any title of honour or titular distinction ... save such appellations as are of a professional or vocational character or which appertain to an office", and that titular honours from foreign governments (meaning those outside the British Empire) should also be banned. However, bravery and valour decorations, such as the Victoria Cross and Military Cross, should be exempt.

Although the second Nickle Resolution was adopted by the House of Commons, it was also not forwarded to the Senate, where it was expected to be defeated, as it touched on the royal prerogative, a constitutional matter outside the competence of the House of Commons alone. As a resolution, rather than an act of Parliament or order-in-council, the Nickle Resolution was not legally binding on the government. It nonetheless established a policy precedent (with a varying degree of enforcement) which has not been challenged by the Senate.

== After the resolution ==
Continentalist and nationalist forces in Canada's political life grew in strength through the 1920s. The Cabinet headed by William Lyon Mackenzie King insisted on an end to imperial practices, such as the British government ultimately appointing Canadian governors general, and demanded practical recognition of the equality between Britain and the Dominions and the latter's autonomy, as set out by the Balfour Declaration of 1926.

The Nickle Resolution was recognized as policy during Mackenzie King's tenure as prime minister and was entrenched in government practice by the time Mackenzie King retired in 1948. However, in February 1929, another debate was held in the House of Commons on the question of titular honours; specifically, on the question of whether the Nickle Resolution ought to be reconsidered. Mackenzie King, on 12 February 1929, stated in the Commons:

If we are to have no titles, titular distinctions, or honours in Canada, let us hold to the principle and have none, let us abolish them altogether; but, if the sovereigns or heads of other countries are to be permitted to bestow honours on Canadians, for my part, I think we owe it to our own sovereign to give him that prerogative before all others.

The motion was defeated on 14 February 1929.

== Granting of honours resumed ==
Starting with the 1933 list, Conservative Prime Minister R.B. Bennett submitted honours lists to the King and various Canadians were decorated, which led to debates in the Parliament. On 30 January 1934, Bennett said about the Nickle Resolution and the shelf-life of Canadian (or more generally, Commonwealth/Westminster) parliamentary resolutions:

It has been a matter of passing comment, as pointed out by an eminent lawyer not long ago, that a resolution of a House of Commons which has long since ceased to be, could not bind future Parliaments and future Houses of Commons. ... The power of a mere resolution by this House, if acceded to, would create such a condition that no principle which secures life or liberty would be safe. That is what Judge Coleridge pointed out.

Moreover, as a matter touching the royal prerogative, Bennett had already reported to the House on 17 May 1933 that the Nickle Resolution was of no force or of null effect, stating that knighting of his minister George Halsey Perley was:

… in conformity with established constitutional practice, it being the considered view of His Majesty's government in Canada that the motion, with respect to honours, adopted on the 22nd day of May, 1919, by a majority vote of the members of the Commons House only of the 13th parliament (which was dissolved on the 4th day of October, 1921) is not binding upon His Majesty or His Majesty's government in Canada or the seventeenth Parliament of Canada.

On 30 January 1934, speaking about his responsibility as prime minister and that he wished to continue the custom of advising the King to bestow royal honours on Canadian subjects (which Conservative and Liberal administrations had chosen not to exercise for almost 15 years), Bennett said:

The action [of recommending people for titular honours] is that of the prime minister; he must assume the responsibility, and the responsibility, too, for advising the Crown that the resolution passed by the House of Commons was without validity, force, or effect, with respect to the sovereign's prerogative. That seems to me to be reasonably clear.

To these official statements can be added what Bennett wrote in a 1934 letter to Member of Parliament John Ritchie MacNicol, when he stated his view that:

So long as I remain a citizen of the British Empire and a loyal subject of the King, I do not propose to do otherwise than assume the prerogative rights of the Sovereign to recognize the services of his subjects.

Moreover, as Bennett stated opening the 1934 debate about the Nickle Resolution:

That was as ineffective in law as it is possible for any group of words to be. It was not only ineffective, but I am sorry to say, it was an affront to the Sovereign himself. Every constitutional lawyer, or anyone who has taken the trouble to study this matter realizes that that is what was done.

R. B. Bennett's government submitted honours lists to the King every year from 1933 until its defeat in 1935, recommending that various prominent Canadians receive knighthoods, including: Sir Lyman Poore Duff, Chief Justice of Canada; Sir James Howden MacBrien, Commissioner of the RCMP; Sir Frederick Banting, the discoverer of insulin; and Sir Ernest MacMillan, composer and conductor.

When a vote was called on 14 March 1934 on a private member's (Humphrey Mitchell, Labour, East Hamilton) earlier resolution to require the prime minister to cease making recommendations to the King for titles (which Bennett in January conceded as "within its [the House's] constitutional rights" and "no affront to the sovereign", although valid only for one term), this renewed Nickle-like Resolution was defeated 113 to 94. The House of Commons of Canada, by this vote, refused to reaffirm or reinstate the Nickle Resolution or its attempts to prevent the Prime Minister's involvement in the exercise of the royal prerogative of granting titles to Canadians. This is the last time that the lower house of Parliament ever voted on the issue.

== Mackenzie King reaffirms ban ==
When William Lyon Mackenzie King returned to power in 1935, he ignored the precedent set by Bennett's government, and resumed the former policy. The no-honours policy of successive Canadian governments has been in effect ever since. However, no attempt was made to forbid the use of the titular honours by those who had been granted them by the King at Bennett's recommendation.

In 1938, Bennett moved to England, and in 1941, he was elevated to the British House of Lords, as the first "Viscount Bennett, of Mickleham in the County of Surrey and of Hopewell and Calgary in Canada".

== Modern policy ==
In 1968, Prime Minister Lester B. Pearson's government published Regulations respecting the acceptance and wearing by Canadians of Commonwealth and foreign orders, decorations and medals. These policies were again affirmed in 1988 when the government of Prime Minister Brian Mulroney published Policy Respecting the Awarding of an Order, Decoration or Medal by a Commonwealth or Foreign Government.

== Conrad Black vs Jean Chrétien ==
The best-known modern application of the Nickle Resolution occurred when Prime Minister Jean Chrétien attempted to use it to prevent Canadian publishing mogul Conrad Black from being appointed a British life peer by the government of British Prime Minister Tony Blair. Chrétien held that, in spite of the fact that the British government was honouring Black as a British citizen, and that Black then held dual citizenship of Canada and Britain (allowed since 1977), he as Prime Minister of Canada could object to Black becoming a British life peer because he was also a Canadian citizen. The Ontario Court of Appeal ruled in favour of Chrétien – but Ontario courts have no jurisdiction outside Ontario. This ruling, however, reportedly caused discomfort for Queen Elizabeth II, who did not wish to judge between the conflicting advice of two prime ministers.

In the end, Black resolved the matter by renouncing his Canadian citizenship, something he had vowed to never do. This made him a British citizen only, so there was no question that Canada had no voice in denying him a British honour. In 2023, Black regained Canadian citizenship while remaining a British peer.

== Exceptions and anomalies ==
Even in the immediate aftermath of the Nickle Resolution, titular honours were granted to subjects of the King who remained residents of Canada, and such honours were passed on to their legal inheritors. The Nickle Resolution was not an effective instrument to establish Canada's desire to end the granting of titular honours to Canadians. It would take later prime ministers to do so.

The prime minister at the time of the resolution, Sir Robert Laird Borden, GCMG, had been knighted in 1914, five years before the adoption of the resolution: but he was away from Canada (attending the Versailles Peace Conference) when the House of Commons considered Nickle's resolution in 1919.

Canadian steel magnate Sir James Hamet Dunn was created a baronet by King George V, Emperor of India, on 13 January 1921, and his son Sir Philip Dunn, 2nd Baronet, inherited his father's baronetcy. At the time, the same parliament that had adopted the Nickle Resolution was still in session. It follows that such a resolution, had it had any binding nature, would have been in effect at least until the dissolution of the 13th parliament on 14 October 1921.

Also honoured following the Nickle Resolution was Sir Frederick Banting, the Canadian medical doctor who co-won the Nobel Prize for Medicine for the discovery of insulin. His knighthood was awarded by King George V in 1934.

The Government of Canada made no objection when, near the end of the Second World War, British prime minister, Winston Churchill, recommended that the King bestow a knighthood on Sir William Stephenson. Churchill described the honour he sought from the King for Stephenson as "one dear to my heart", such was Churchill's sense of gratitude for Stephenson's wartime intelligence work. Years later, Sir William was given Canada's then highest honour in being made a Companion of the Order of Canada in 1979.

Another significant example of government indecision over the matter of titular honours involves former Canadian governor general Vincent Massey. While on a visit to Canada in August 1954, The Duke of Edinburgh told Massey the Queen wished to make him a Knight Companion of the Order of the Garter, the most senior of the orders of chivalry she could bestow. Massey would have been the first non-Briton and non-Irish person to receive the Garter, other than foreign heads of state and foreign royalty. Then-prime minister Louis St. Laurent was cool to the proposal, but agreed to take the matter under advisement. Shortly after coming to power in 1957, John Diefenbaker was initially receptive, but ultimately changed his mind and so informed the Queen in 1960. Just weeks later, the Queen honoured Massey with the rarer (but non-titular) Royal Victorian Chain.

A different example was that of Sir Ted Leather, KCMG, KCVO, LLD, the Toronto-born Governor of Bermuda. He arrived in Britain with the Canadian Army in 1940, and stayed on after World War II to become a Conservative Member of Parliament. After the murder of Sir Richard Sharples, the Bermudian viceroy, Sir Ted was appointed to the vacant colonial governorship at the recommendation of the government of British Prime Minister Edward Heath. When Sir Ted was knighted in 1962, since he had not lived in Canada since 1940 (and Canadian citizenship was not defined as distinct from British until the Canadian Citizenship Act 1946) he was not made to renounce his citizenship in his native country.

In addition to this extraterritorial anomaly, even today the Governor General of Canada is actively involved in the creation of knights and dames via presiding over the Canadian branch of the Order of St John, conferring knighthoods and damehoods on some of its members in ceremonies at which the governor general performs the act of investing new recipients with their honour. However, this honour does not use the usual knightly accolade of Sir or Dame followed by their personal and family names and the claim is made that the honour of knighthood or damehood is conferred without the Queen or her governor general's concession of any appellative accolade, thus avoiding the bestowal of any titular honour.

During the premiership of Tony Blair, at least two persons holding British citizenship were granted titular honours by the Crown before the Black peerage issue, which brought the matter to the Canadian prime minister's attention.

On 2 November 1999, Canadian Senator Anne Cools brought to the Senate of Canada's notice the discrepancy in policy on orders for English Canadians and orders for French Canadians:

Honourable senators, the sovereign of France, the President, conferred the Ordre royal de la Légion d'honneur on Quebecer Robert Gagnon just two weeks ago, and on Premier René Lévesque in 1977, while he was Premier of Quebec. No doubt Premier Lévesque would have frowned on any anglophone premier being knighted "Sir" by the Queen of Canada.

In addition, on 4 November 1999, she brought to the Senate's notice the fact that in the first decade alone after the Nickle Resolution was debated, there were

many distinguished Canadians who have received 646 orders and distinctions from foreign non-British, non-Canadian sovereigns between 1919 and February 1929.

In February 2004, the Department of International Trade announced the impending visit to Sydney of Sir Terry Matthews, dual citizen of the United Kingdom and Canada, with a press release that included the following passage: "Sir Terry is the Chairman of Mitel Networks. ... In 1994, he was appointed an Officer of the Order of the British Empire and was awarded a knighthood in the Queen's Birthday Honours, 2001."

Some Canadian title holders do not employ their British- or French-derived titles in Canada. One such example being Kenneth Thomson, who, from his father's death in 1976 until his own death in 2006, held the hereditary peerage Baron Thomson of Fleet. Thomson once stated in an interview "In London I'm Lord Thomson, in Toronto I'm Ken. I have two sets of Christmas cards and two sets of stationery. You might say I'm having my cake and eating it too. I'm honouring a promise to my father by being Lord Thomson, and at the same time I can just be Ken."

== Other Commonwealth countries ==
Commonwealth countries such as the United Kingdom, New Zealand, Jamaica, and Papua New Guinea still confer titular honours. In recent years, however, the latter two have generally opted to bestow national orders of similar standing, offering membership in the Order of the National Hero of Jamaica and Order of the Logohu as alternatives which come with their own styles of Right Excellent and Chief or Grand Chief, respectively. Appointment to the highest rank of the New Zealand Order of Merit grants members the right to use the titles sir or dame. However, between 2000 and 2009, during the premiership of Helen Clark, the conferral of knighthoods and damehoods was temporarily discontinued, with the two higher grades of the order being replaced with postnominals to indicate membership, more like the one-grade Order of New Zealand. In March 2009, John Key requested to Elizabeth II that the order be resumed at the pre-2000 grades and granting of knighthoods and damehoods was continued. As in Australia, the Queen continued to make titular awards in the Royal Victorian Order, the Order of the Thistle, and the Order of the Garter, since these orders are within the sovereign's prerogative. New Zealanders who received New Zealand's former titular honours prior to 2000 may continue to employ them and those New Zealanders who received the equivalent postnominals between 2000 and 2008 were allowed to exchange them for the restored titles if they so chose.

Australia retained access to the Imperial (British) honours system until October 1992 with the 1983 New Year Honours being the last awards recommended by the federal government. The last awards recommended by state governments were in 1989. The Order of Australia (analogous to the Order of Canada) was established in 1975 without knighthoods and damehoods. Knighthoods and damehoods were introduced in 1976 and discontinued in 1983, re-established in 2014, and discontinued again in 2015. The King of Australia, in his personal capacity, retains the ability to appoint Australian citizens as knights and ladies companion of the Order of the Garter, knights and ladies of the Order of the Thistle, and knights and dames grand cross and commander of the Royal Victorian Order, an act solely within the sovereign's personal discretion, his Australian ministers having no involvement, but, as in the case of Queen Elizabeth II, this supposed ability has never been exercised. The Australian Order of Wear states that awards conferred by the Sovereign in exercise of the Royal Prerogative are treated as Australian and not foreign awards.

== See also ==
- Canadian peers and baronets
- Baronetcies conferred on the recommendation of Canadian governments
- Orders, decorations, and medals of Canada
- Canadian order of precedence (decorations and medals)
- Political culture of Canada
- Monarchy of Canada
- Honours (Prevention of Abuses) Act 1925

== Bibliography ==
- McCreery, Christopher (2005). The Order of Canada: Its Origins, History and Development. Toronto: University of Toronto Press. ISBN 0-8020-3940-5 Contains a full discussion of Canadian government policy towards titular honours.
- The Rule of Law and the Justiciability of Prerogative Powers: A Comment on Black v. Chrétien (pdf)
- Senator Anne C. Cools' webpages detailing the applicability of the Nickle Resolution during R.B. Bennett's time and afterward
