= The French Connection (aerobatics) =

Aerobatic team

Daniel and Montaine flying their signature 'French Connection' canopy-to-canopy 'mirror' formation

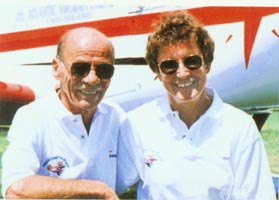
Daniel and Montaine, ca. 1998

The French Connection was a famous husband-wife aerobatic pair that performed in countless airshows throughout North America for almost 30 years. The pair consisted of Daniel Héligoin, a former French Air Force fighter pilot and aerobatic champion, and Montaine Mallet, an aeronautical engineer and his assistant who later became his wife. Both Daniel and Montaine were French-born; they came to the U.S. from France in 1973 to promote and sell their aerobatic plane, the CAP-10, manufactured by Avions Mudry in France. They operated an aerobatics school at Sky Acres Airport, NY, Dutchess County Airport, NY, then at Flagler County Airport, FL. They regularly performed at airshows around the U.S. and Canada until their death in a training accident on May 27, 2000. Their favorite and signature 'French Connection' aerobatic routine was unique: Montaine and Daniel would fly their CAP-10 planes in an extremely tight canopy-to-canopy formation, literally inches apart, through various hair-raising aerobatic maneuvers. Daniel and Montaine loved to teach, and they devoted much of their careers to aerobatic instruction. The "French Connection Scholarship" fund was established in their name via the International Council of Air Shows Foundation.
