= William Harty =

Canadian politician

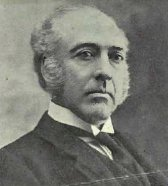

Member of Parliament for Kingston
- In office 1902–1911
- Preceded by: Byron Moffatt Britton
- Succeeded by: William Folger Nickle

Ontario MPP
- In office 1895–1901
- Preceded by: Edward H. Smythe
- Succeeded by: Edward John Barker Pense
- In office 1892–1894
- Preceded by: James Henry Metcalfe
- Succeeded by: Edward H. Smythe
- Constituency: Kingston

Personal details
- Born: March 8, 1847 Biddulph Township, Upper Canada
- Died: April 1, 1929 (aged 82) Kingston, Ontario
- Party: Liberal
- Spouse: Catherine Mary Bermingham (m. 1870)
- Occupation: Businessman

William Harty (March 8, 1847 – April 1, 1929) was a businessman and politician in Ontario, Canada. He represented Kingston in the Legislative Assembly of Ontario from 1892 to 1894 and from 1895 to 1901 and Kingston in the House of Commons of Canada from 1902 to 1911 as a Liberal member.

He was born in Biddulph Township, Canada West in 1847, the son of John Harty, an Irish immigrant, and was educated in Kingston. He worked in his uncle's wholesale grocery business, taking control of the company after his uncle died in 1866. In 1870, he married Catherine Mary Bermingham. Harty was president of the local Board of Trade in 1873. He was a director of the Kingston and Pembroke Railway from 1875 to 1879. In 1881, Harty helped establish the Kingston Charcoal and Iron Company. In 1883, Harty and his wife were part of a group which established a Women's Medical College at Queen's University.

With others, including George Airey Kirkpatrick and Richard John Cartwright, he helped bring the Canadian Locomotive and Engine Company back to Kingston from Montreal and Harty became its managing director. Several years later, the company was sold to a Scottish firm and Harty become general manager in Canada for the Equitable Life Assurance Society. In 1900, he was part of a group that purchased Canadian Locomotive and Engine Company after the company went into receivership; it was renamed the Canadian Locomotive Company Limited in 1901. Harty served as company president until 1911 when it was purchased by a group of Toronto investors.

In 1879, Harty became a member of Kingston city council. In 1892, he was elected to the provincial assembly in a by-election held after James Henry Metcalfe was elected to the House of Commons. He lost the seat by one vote in 1894 and won the by-election that followed in 1895. Harty served as Commissioner of Crown Lands from 1894 to 1896 and Commissioner of Public Works from 1896 to 1899. In 1892, he was elected to the House of Commons after Byron Moffatt Britton was named a judge. In fact he succeeded Britton on the Ontario Supreme Court in 1920.

Harty retired from politics in 1911. He also was a trustee for Queen's University and a member of the senate for the University of Toronto. He died in Kingston in 1929.
