= Grip (magazine) =

Defunct Canadian satirical magazine

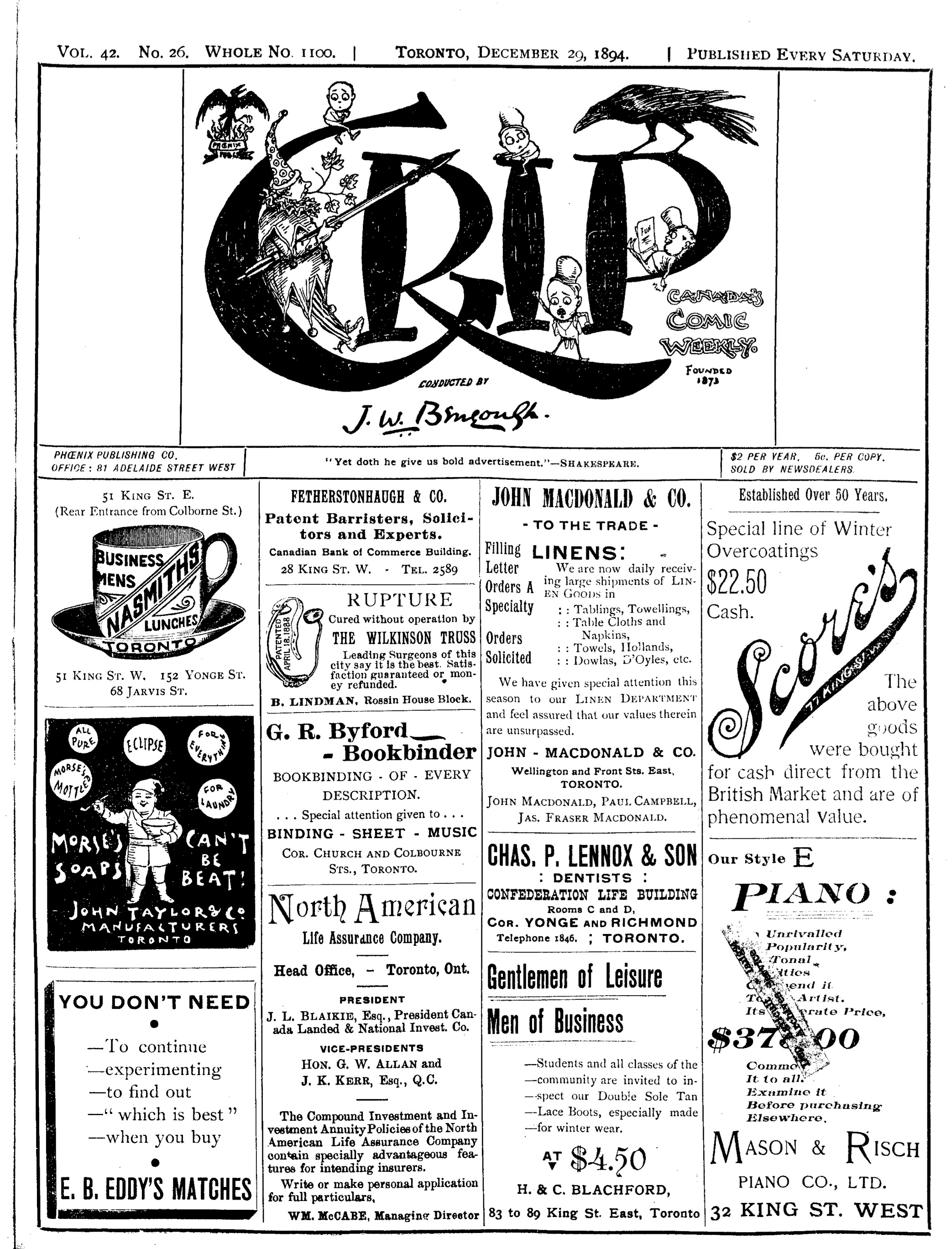
- Cover of Grip's last issue, December 29, 1894
- Editor: John Wilson Bengough (1873–1892); Thomas Phillips Thompson (1892–1894)
- Publisher: Grip Ltd
- First issue: May 24, 1873
- Final issue: December 29, 1894
- Country: Canada
- ISSN: 0702-3987
- OCLC: 604715074

Grip was a satirical magazine published in Toronto by John Wilson Bengough between 1873 and 1894.

Grip's first issue was released on May 24, 1873. The magazine's title was taken from the name of a raven in Barnaby Rudge, a novel by Charles Dickens. Its weekly circulation peaked at approximately 7,000 copies per week. Ramsay Cook argues that the magazine first entered mainstream consciousness during the Pacific Scandal.

Bengough took inspiration from the cartoons of Thomas Nast, particularly those mocking William M. Tweed, a Tammany Hall boss, that appeared in Harper's Weekly. Cumming argues that Grip was strongly influenced by Punch, a British magazine of political satire.

Mendelson suggests that Grip's political line was strongly influenced by the political economy of Henry George, who argued for free trade and a single land tax. Mendelson also points out that the publication espoused racist, antisemitic, and nativist views by perpetuating stereotypical portrayals of Black and Jewish people, non-white immigrants, and others. Grip generally had Grit leanings.

Thomas Phillips Thompson became Grip's editor in 1892 after Bengough was removed.

== Sources ==
- Cook, Ramsay (1985). The Regenerators: Social Criticism in Late Victorian English Canada. University of Toronto Press. ISBN 0-8020-5670-9. OCLC 16710349.
- Cumming, Carman (1997). Sketches from a Young Country: The Images of Grip Magazine. University of Toronto Press. doi:10.3138/9781442679993. ISBN 978-1-4426-7999-3. OCLC 666916855.
- Mendelson, Alan (May 2007). "Grip Magazine and 'the Other': The Genteel Antisemitism of J. W. Bengough". Histoire Sociale/Social History. 40 (79): 1–44. ISSN 0018-2257.
