= Timeline of the Alexander Mackenzie premiership =

Alexander MacKenzie premiership timeline

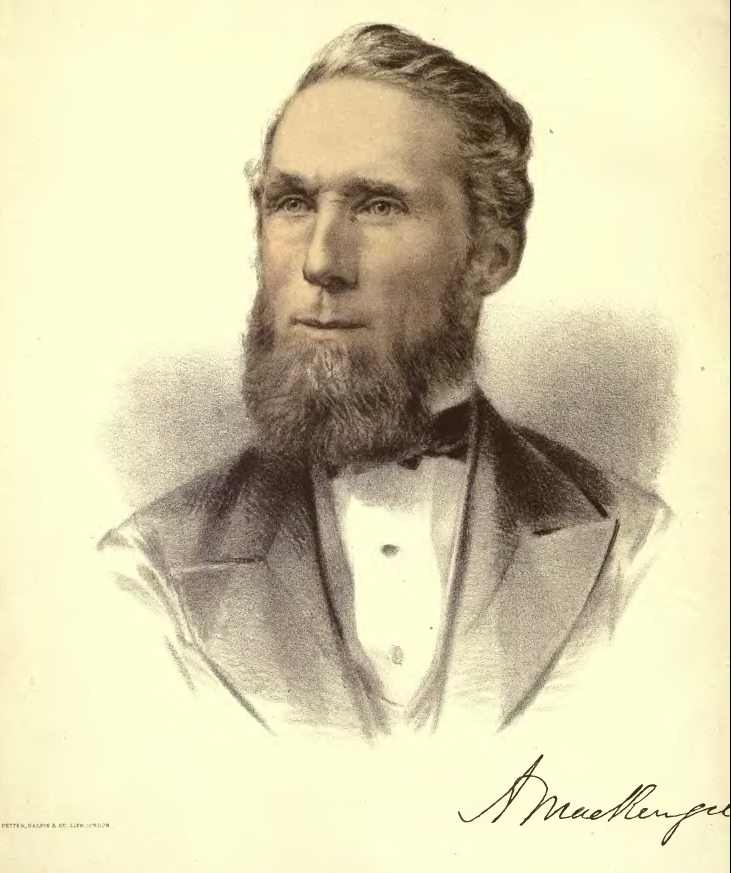
Prime Minister Mackenzie

The following is a timeline of the Premiership of Alexander Mackenzie, who served as the second Prime Minister of Canada from November 7, 1873, to October 8, 1878.

== 1873 ==
- November 8 – Winnipeg is incorporated.

== 1874 ==
- January 22 – Mackenzie leads the Liberal Party to its first majority government in the 1874 Canadian federal election.
- March 26 – The 3rd Canadian Parliament enters session.
- May 29 – The Dominion Elections Act is passed, introducing the secret ballot and abolishing property qualifications.

== 1875 ==
- April 8 – The Supreme and Exchequer Courts Act is passed, establishing the Supreme Court of Canada.
- June 1 – The Canadian Pacific Railway begins construction.

== 1876 ==
- April 12 – The Indian Act is passed, defining many interactions between Indigenous Canadians and the Canadian Government.
- July 1 – The Intercolonial Railway is completed, connecting Central Canada to the Maritimes.
- October 7 – The District of Keewatin is created from the North-West Territories.

== 1877 ==
- September 22 – Treaty 7 is signed between the Canadian Government and seven First Nations band governments.

== 1878 ==
- September 17 – Mackenzie's Liberal Party is defeated in the 1878 Canadian federal election by John A. Macdonald's Conservative Party.

Timelines of Canadian premierships
Preceded by John A. Macdonald	Alexander Mackenzie; 1873–1878	Succeeded by John A. Macdonald
