= Jane Mackenzie =

Wife of Canadian Prime Minister

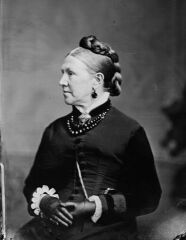
- Born: Jane Sym; March 22, 1825; Elphin, Upper Canada
- Died: March 30, 1893 (aged 68); Toronto, Ontario, Canada
- Resting place: Lakeview Cemetery, Sarnia, Ontario, Canada
- Known for: Spouse of the Prime Minister of Canada
- Spouse: Alexander Mackenzie (m. 1853; died 1892)

Jane Mackenzie (née Sym; March 22, 1825 – March 30, 1893) was the second wife of Alexander Mackenzie, the second Prime Minister of Canada.

She married Alexander Mackenzie on June 17, 1853. The couple had no children, although Jane Mackenzie was stepmother to Alexander's daughter from his prior marriage. They are buried at the Lakeview Cemetery in Sarnia, Ontario.

== See also ==
- Spouse of the prime minister of Canada
