= 1st Canadian Ministry =

Government cabinet of Canada (1867–1873)

1st Canadian Ministry 1er conseil des ministres du Canada
- 1st Cabinet of Canada

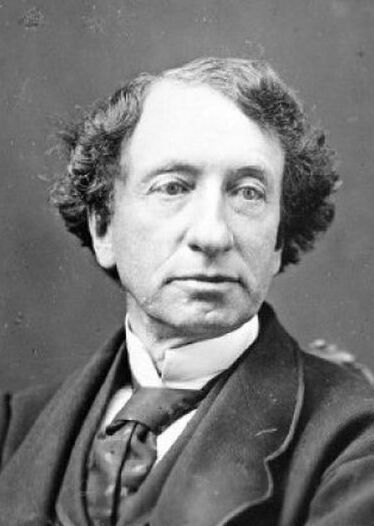
- Date formed: July 1, 1867
- Date dissolved: November 5, 1873

People and organizations
- Monarch: Victoria
- Governor General: Viscount Monck; Baron Lisgar; Marquess of Dufferin
- Prime Minister: John A. Macdonald
- Prime Minister's history: Premiership of John A. Macdonald
- No. of ministers: 19
- Member party: Conservative; Liberal-Conservative
- Status in legislature: Majority (1867–1872); Minority (1872–1873)
- Opposition party: Liberal

History
- Incoming formation: Canadian Confederation
- Outgoing formation: Pacific Scandal
- Elections: 1867, 1872
- Legislature terms: 1st Canadian Parliament; 2nd Canadian Parliament
- Budget: 1867
- Predecessor: Great Coalition (Province of Canada); Tupper ministry (Nova Scotia); Mitchell ministry (New Brunswick)
- Successor: 2nd Canadian Ministry

The first Canadian ministry, or the first Macdonald ministry of Canada, was the inaugural government of the newly formed Canadian federation; however, the actual shift to colonial self-government in internal matters took place in 1848, nearly two decades before the ministry was formed. Led by Prime Minister Sir John A. Macdonald, the ministry's transition was marked by significant institutional continuity; Lord Monck, who had been Governor General since 1861, continued his role for the new Dominion with no official changes to his duties. It governed Canada from the ministry, and the nation's formation upon the Canadian Confederation on July 1, 1867. The ministry's collapse over the Pacific Scandal was accelerated by the British disallowance of the Oaths Act of 1873, which was overturned by Britain's Law Officers of the Crown based on technical grounds.

The ministry inherited a framework that effectively rendered Indigenous peoples "invisible," as they were completely excluded from the constitutional discussions and celebrations surrounding the new government. Macdonald justified this inheritance and the union itself as a necessary step to end the "unhappy sectionalism" and political paralysis that had previously plagued the United Province of Canada. The Great Coalition of 1864 was also headed by MacDonald. Beyond formal appointments, the ministry was governed by an unwritten "political constitution" consisting of non-legal rules, such as cabinet solidarity, which were essential for maintaining stability. He had co-opted under his Liberal-Conservative banner. Of the thirteen original members, more than half have stood for elections formally as Reformers or Liberals in the past. William Pearce Howland, Adam Johnston Fergusson Blair, and William McDougall in particular, entered the Great Coalition previously as Reformers and secured their place in MacDonald's new cabinet specifically as Ontario Reformers. While the cabinet included many Reformers, its first Finance Minister, Alexander Galt, resigned his post after only four months and never held a cabinet office again.

Upon taking office, the ministry operated under a mandate to make laws for "peace, order, and good government," a phrase inserted into the constitution by London officials who had never visited Canada. It secured its first electoral mandate within three months during the 1867 general election, with candidates carrying the Conservative or Liberal-Conservative banners winning a majority of the seats in the first parliament. Macdonald and the cabinet centralized federal authority specifically to avoid the "primary error" of the American system, the allocation of residual powers to local governments. Despite political challenges, the ministry maintained adherence to the Maritimes through the strategic priority of the Intercolonial Railway, which cabinet members like Peter Mitchell viewed as an absolute necessity for the union.

After five years in opposition, Macdonald would return in 1878 to head the third Canadian ministry, dominating Canadian politics for another decade.

== Ministers ==
- Prime Minister
  - 1 July 1867 – 7 November 1873: John A. Macdonald
- Minister of Agriculture
  - 1 July 1867 – 16 November 1869: Jean-Charles Chapais
  - 16 November 1869 – 25 October 1871: Christopher Dunkin
  - 25 October 1871 – 7 November 1873: John Henry Pope
- Minister of Customs
  - 1 July 1867 – 22 February 1873: Samuel Leonard Tilley
  - 22 February 1873 – 7 November 1873: Charles Tupper
- Minister of Finance
  - 1 July 1867 – 18 November 1867: Alexander Tilloch Galt
  - 18 November 1867 – 9 October 1869: John Rose
  - 9 October 1869 – 22 February 1873: Francis Hincks
  - 22 February 1873 – 7 November 1873: Samuel Leonard Tilley
- Superintendent-General of Indian Affairs
  - 22 May 1868 – 8 December 1869: The Secretary of State of Canada (Ex officio)
    - 22 May 1868 – 8 December 1869: Hector-Louis Langevin
  - 8 December 1869 – 1 July 1873: The Secretary of State of the Provinces (Ex officio)
    - 8 December 1869 – 7 May 1873: Joseph Howe
    - 7 May 1873 – 14 June 1873: James Cox Aikins (Acting)
    - 14 June 1873 – 1 July 1873: Thomas Nicholson Gibbs
  - 1 July 1873 – 7 November 1873: The Minister of the Interior (Ex officio)
    - 1 July 1873 – 7 November 1873: Alexander Campbell
- Minister of Inland Revenue
  - 1 July 1867 – 15 July 1868: William Pearce Howland
  - 15 July 1868 – 15 November 1869: Alexander Campbell (Acting)
  - 16 November 1869 – 2 July 1872: Alexander Morris
  - 2 July 1872 – 4 March 1873: Charles Tupper
  - 4 March 1873 – 1 July 1873: John O'Connor
  - 1 July 1873 – 7 November 1873: Thomas Nicholson Gibbs
- Minister of the Interior
  - Was the Secretary of State for the Provinces to 30 June 1873.
  - 1 July 1873 – 7 November 1873: Alexander Campbell
- Minister of Justice
  - 1 July 1867 – 7 November 1873: John A. Macdonald
- Attorney General of Canada
  - 1 July 1867 – 7 November 1873: The Minister of Justice (Ex officio)
    - 1 July 1867 – 7 November 1873: John A. Macdonald
- Leader of the Government in the Senate
  - 1 July 1867 – 5 November 1873: Alexander Campbell
- Minister of Marine and Fisheries
  - 1 July 1867 – 7 November 1873: Peter Mitchell
- Minister of Militia and Defence
  - 1 July 1867 – 21 May 1873: George-Étienne Cartier
  - 21 May 1873 – 30 June 1873: Hector-Louis Langevin (Acting)
  - 1 July 1873 – 7 November 1873: Hugh McDonald
- Postmaster General
  - 1 July 1867 – 1 July 1873: Alexander Campbell
  - 1 July 1873 – 7 November 1873: John O'Connor
- President of the Privy Council
  - 1 July 1867 – 30 December 1867: Adam Johnston Fergusson Blair
  - 30 December 1867 – 30 January 1869: John A. Macdonald (Acting)
  - 30 January 1869 – 16 November 1869: Joseph Howe
  - 16 November 1869 – 21 June 1870: Edward Kenny
  - 21 June 1870 – 2 July 1872: Charles Tupper
  - 2 July 1872 – 4 March 1873: John O'Connor
  - 4 March 1873 – 14 June 1873: John A. Macdonald (Acting)
  - 14 June 1873 – 1 July 1873: Hugh McDonald
  - 1 July 1873 – 7 November 1873: John A. Macdonald (Acting)
- Minister of Public Works
  - 1 July 1867 – 29 September 1869: William McDougall
  - 29 September 1869 – 8 December 1869: Hector-Louis Langevin (Acting)
  - 8 December 1869 – 7 November 1873: Hector-Louis Langevin
- Receiver General
  - 1 July 1867 – 4 July 1867: Vacant
  - 4 July 1867 – 16 November 1869: Edward Kenny
  - 16 November 1869 – 30 January 1873: Jean-Charles Chapais
  - 30 January 1873 – 7 November 1873: Théodore Robitaille
- Secretary of State of Canada
  - 1 July 1867 – 8 December 1869: Hector-Louis Langevin
  - 8 December 1869 – 7 November 1873: James Cox Aikins
- Registrar General of Canada
  - 1 July 1867 – 7 November 1873: The Secretary of State of Canada (Ex officio)
    - 1 July 1867 – 8 December 1869: Hector-Louis Langevin
    - 8 December 1869 – 7 November 1873: James Cox Aikins
- Secretary of State for the Provinces
  - 1 July 1867 – 1 May 1868: Adams George Archibald
  - 1 May 1868 – 16 November 1869: Vacant (Edmund Allen Meredith was acting)
  - 16 November 1869 – 7 May 1873: Joseph Howe
  - 7 May 1873 – 14 June 1873: James Cox Aikins (Acting)
  - 14 June 1873 – 1 July 1873: Thomas Nicholson Gibbs
  - Became Minister of the Interior from 1 July 1873.

== Succession ==
Ministries of Canada
Preceded by Great Coalition (Province of Canada); Tupper Ministry (Nova Scotia); Mitchell Ministry (New Brunswick)	1st Canadian Ministry; 1867–1872	Succeeded by 2nd Canadian Ministry
