= Andrew Scott Irving =

Canadian bookseller and publisher

- Born: 13 October 1837; Annan, Scotland
- Died: 29 April 1904 (aged 66); Toronto, Ontario, Canada
- Burial place: St. James Cemetery, Toronto
- Occupations: bookseller, publisher

Andrew Scott Irving (13 October 1837 – 29 April 1904) was a Scottish-born Canadian bookseller and publisher.

Irving was born in Annan in Scotland. He moved with his parents to the United States while still young. He relocated to Hamilton in the Province of Canada around 1857 or 1858 and found employment with the Detroit-based W. E. Tunis, a book and periodical distributor with a monopoly on the Great Western Railway in Canada.

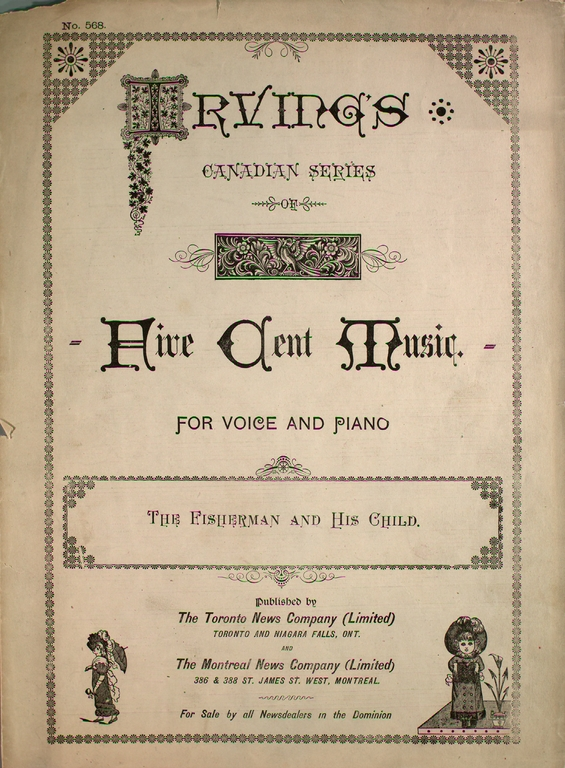
Irving's Toronto News Company also published sheet music under the imprint Irving's Five Cent Music "The Fisherman and His Child" by C. A. White

In autumn 1862 Irving set up a bookstore on King and Jordan streets in Toronto, and soon expanded into wholesale. By the 1870s he was issuing inexpensive reproductions of popular novels and sheet music of popular songs under the imprint Irving's Five Cent Music. The imprint published 750 sheet music issues; when is uncertain as they lack copyright notices, but evidence suggests they may have appeared as early as the late 1860s and had ceased at around the mid-1880s; the majority appear to have been published in the first half of the 1880s; few were explicitly Canadian in content, and only five are known to have been by Canadians. (Note: These are No. 55 "Beautiful girl of Kildare" by Calixa Lavallée, No. 144 "Canada: National Song and Chorus" by Frances J. Hatton, No. 194 "The Vine-covered Cottage" by William Horatio Clarke, No. 254 "When You and I Were Young, Maggie" by James Austin Butterfield with lyrics composed in Hamilton by George Washington Johnson, and No. 269 "The Maple Leaf, our Emblem Dear" by Alexander Muir.)

Printing for Irving was handled at John Ross Robertson's Daily Telegraph, and Irving later owned stock on Robertson's Telegram Printing and Publishing Company, which printed the Toronto Evening Telegram. In 1873, Irving financed the printing of John Wilson Bengough's humorous weekly Grip. In partnership with Russel Wilkinson he ran another bookstore on Toronto Street called A. S. Irving and Company from 1874 to 1876.

Irving turned focus on the printing and distribution of inexpensive popular reading material, such as paperbound books, particularly to the lucrative train passenger market. With Copp, Clark and Company, in 1876 Irving co-founded the Canadian News Company Limited (later renamed the Toronto News Company Limited). He soon had a stock that was said to be second only to the New York-based American News Company. With Samuel Edward Dawson, W. V. Dawson, and Copp, Clark and Company, Irving was involved in the incorporation of the Montreal News Company in 1880. From 1881 Irving was a member of the Toronto Region Board of Trade, and was a director of the Great North Western Telegraph Company and other companies. The warehouse of the Toronto News Company in 1884 was a four-story building, selling stationery on the first floor, games and greeting cards on the second, mass-market books and sheet music on the third, and a distribution centre on the fourth, with a box for each customer of the company's in Canada, the US, and Britain.

The majority of the shares in the Toronto News Company Limited were owned by two of the co-founders of the American News Company by 1889, and Irving's company eventually became a subsidiary of the American company, of which Irving owned shares. The Toronto News Company name itself lasted until 1918. With his wife Eliza (née Morgan), he had two sons and a daughter; one son died in childhood, another, Andrew Maxwell, died in 1896, and his daughter Nellie died in 1900. Irving's two granddaughters inherited most of his estate on his death in Toronto on 29 April 1904. Irving was buried in St. James Cemetery in Toronto.

Irving is remembered as a pioneer in Canadian publishing, and had a reputation for discouraging the distribution of what was considered "trash" literature, promoting instead light literature with higher repute.
