= Sam Hunter (cartoonist) =

Canadian cartoonist and writer

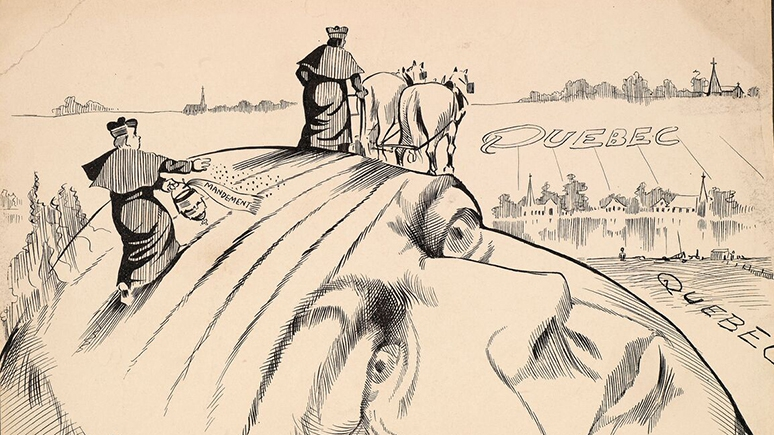
- "Seeds of Discord and Furrows of Care", The Toronto World, 30 January 1897
- Born: Samuel Hunter; March 1859 Millbrook, Canada West
- Died: December 1939 (aged 80) Toronto, Ontario, Canada
- Area: cartoonist
- Spouse: Jeanette Brayley (m. 1888)
- Children: Mary Collingwood

Sam Hunter (1858–1939) was a Canadian cartoonist and writer who worked for four Toronto newspapers. His work displayed his support for the Conservative Party of Canada and criticized Liberals such as Wilfrid Laurier, as well as French Canadians, Catholics, and Americans. Peter Desbarats and Terry Mosher described Hunter as "a great and gentle caricaturist".

== Biography ==
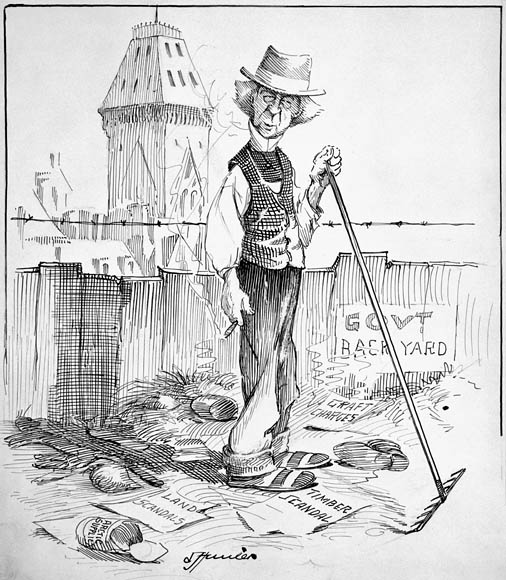
"As the snow of concealment disappears", The Toronto World, 26 March 1908.

Hunter was born in Millbrook in Canada West in March 1859, and first started showing his talent for caricature during his time as a schoolboy. He initially followed his father John Hunter's footsteps to become a Clerk of the Division Court at Millbrook.

As a young man, he travelled through Western Canada, and produced a series of prints concerning Indians and western life. His first published work as an illustrator appeared in 1882, with his first political cartoons commissioned by John Wilson Bengough for the satirical magazine Grip in Toronto. He was firmly established in Toronto by 1885. Together with Bengough and other cartoonists, he helped to popularize the fictional character of Johnny Canuck as a national personification of Canada.

He worked for the Toronto World newspaper for twenty years beginning in 1897. His work displayed his support for the Conservative Party of Canada and criticized Liberals such as Wilfrid Laurier, French Canadians, Catholics, and Americans. Many of Hunter's cartoons were inspired by William Findlay Maclean.

During World War I, Hunter moved to The Globe where his satirical targets included French-Canadian opposition to conscription. These cartoons had a noticeable anti-Laurier and anti-Quebec bias. After the war, he moved to the Toronto Star. He had also worked for the Toronto News

For three months every summer, Hunter stayed at "Pepacton", a cottage on the McCracken's Shore of Stony Lake, which became a gathering place for artists, writers and musicians. He wrote about the area for the Peterborough Examiner in 1895.

Hunter retired in early 1937, and died in Toronto in December 1939.
