= George Ham =

Canadian journalist (1847–1926)

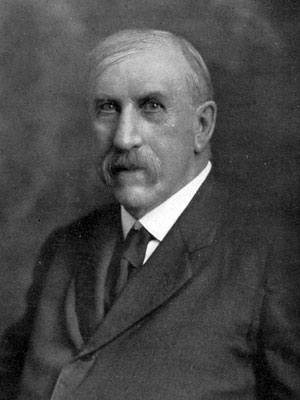
- George Ham in 1921
- Born: 23 August 1847; Trent Port, Province of Canada
- Died: 16 April 1926 (aged 78); Montreal, Quebec, Canada
- Occupations: Journalist; Office holder; Writer; Lobbyist

George Henry Ham (23 August 1847 – 16 April 1926) was a Canadian journalist, writer, office holder, and lobbyist.

Ham was born in Trent Port (modern Trenton, Ontario) in the Province of Canada to Eliza Anne Eleanor Clute and John Vandal Ham, a country doctor of Loyalist stock who later took up law. Ham rejected his father's wish that he become a lawyer to pursue journalism, first at the Whitby Chronicle in 1865. He became editor of the Whitby Gazette, where he capitalized on interest in the Franco-Prussian War by issuing it as a four-page daily in mid-1870. He commissioned a young John Wilson Bengough to provide a serialized novel for it, whose popular reception encouraged Bengough to devote himself to a journalism career.

After numerous odd jobs and newspaper work in Guelph and Uxbridge Ham moved to Manitoba in 1875 and obtained work as a compositor at the Manitoba Free Press, where he began writing anonymous humour articles. The editor William Luxton soon promoted him to the editorial department where he later became city editor. In Shannonville on 24 December 1870 Ham married Martha Helen Blow, with whom he had two daughters and three sons.

Ham launched the Winnipeg Daily Tribune in October 1879, and continued as managing editor when it merged with Daily Times a few months later. He found newspaper work hard on his health and took up a post as registrar of deeds for the town of Selkirk in 1882, which he held until the outbreak of the North-West Rebellion in 1885. His articles as a war correspondent were widely quoted and he was admitted to the Parliamentary Press Gallery in Ottawa in 1886. He became a friend of Wilfrid Laurier.

Ham was active in Winnipeg society. He served as a school trustee in the 1880s, alderman for Ward 1 of the Winnipeg City Council as in 1883, 1884, and 1887, and commissioner for the federal McCarthy Act for liquor licensing.

In July 1891 Ham met Canadian Pacific Railway president William Cornelius Van Horne, who immediately hired him as general passenger agent. The job took Ham to Montreal, and two years later he became a journalist for the Canadian Pacific Press Bureau. His work promoting the CPR and tourism made him well known throughout Canada. The Canadian Women's Press Club made him honorary president in 1904 after he secured free transportation for sixteen Canadian women journalists to cover the Louisiana Purchase Exposition. In 1913 he was appointed special assistant to the CPR president, a post in which he lobbied for the company. He continued with the CPR until his death in Montreal. He was buried in Whitby.

== List of works ==
- The New West: Extending from the Great Lakes across Plain and Mountain to the Golden Shores of the Pacific: Wealth and Growth, Manufacturing and Commercial Interests, Historical, Statistical, Biographical (1888)
- Our Western Heritage (c. 1895)
- The Flitting of the Gods: An Authentic Account of the Great Trek from Mount Olympus to the Canadian Rockies (1906)
- All's Well, No Blue Ruin (c. 1914)
- Reminiscences of a Raconteur, Between the '40s and the '20s (1921)
- The Miracle Man of Montreal (biography of André Bessette, 1922)
