= Lakeview Cemetery (Sarnia, Ontario) =

Cemetery in Ontario, Canada

Lakeview cemetery
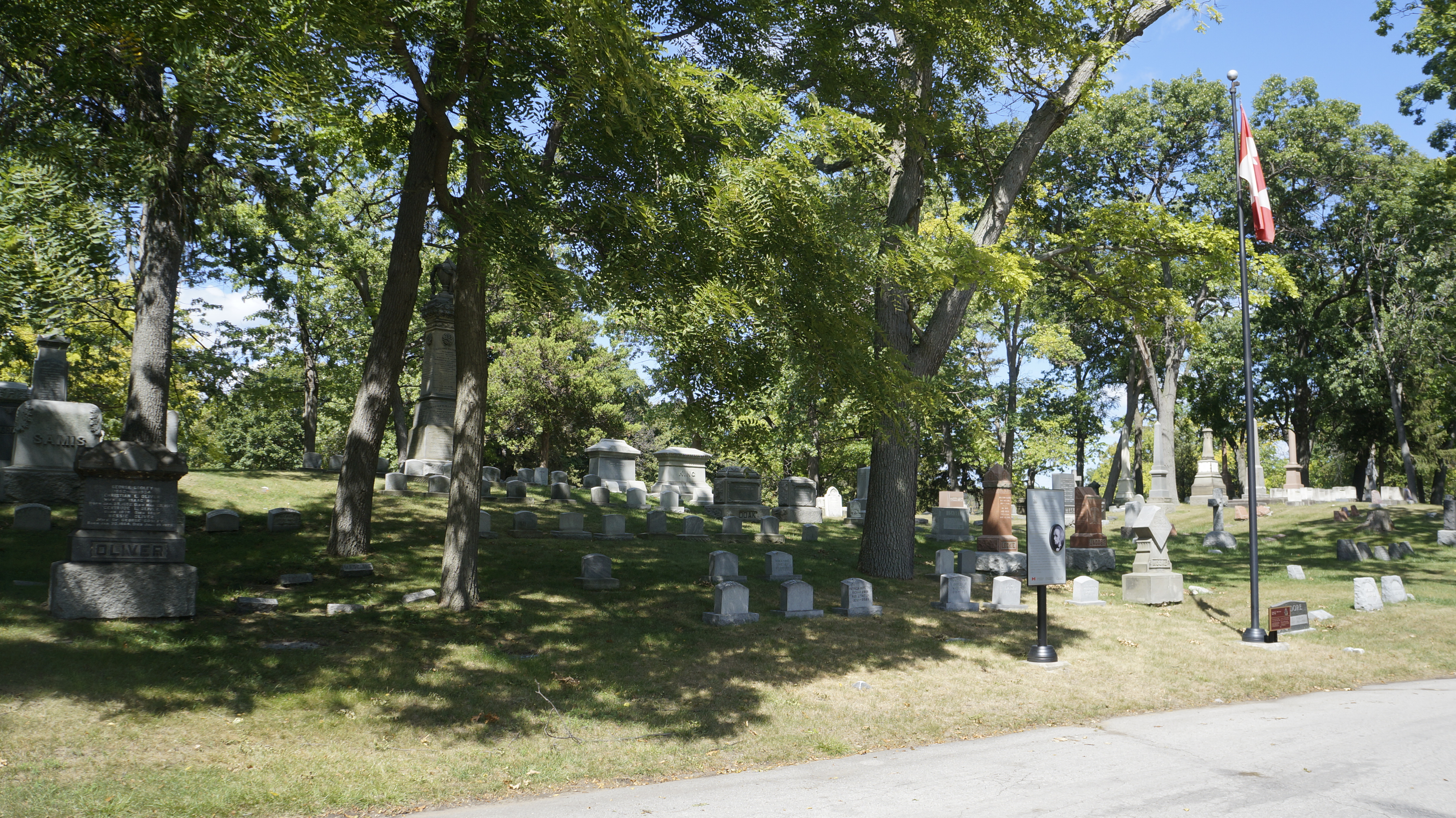
- Grave Of Alexander Mackenzie
- Interactive map of Lakeview cemetery

Details
- Established: 1879
- Location: 1016 Colborne Road, Sarnia, Ontario
- Country: Canada
- Coordinates: 42.9952°N 82.3846°W
- No. of interments: >13,000
- Website: www.lakeviewcemetery.ca
- Find a Grave: Lakeview cemetery

Lakeview Cemetery Company is a cemetery located at Colborne Road and Michigan Avenue in Sarnia, Ontario. Opened in 1879 by the Town of Sarnia to replace smaller and church-based cemeteries, it is most notable for being the burial place of Canadian prime minister Alexander Mackenzie. The cemetery, which is still an active burial site and now has a crematorium, contains the war graves of 11 Canadian service personnel of World War I and 13 of World War II.

Other notables buried here include:

- Pauline Mills McGibbon - Lieutenant Governor of Ontario
- Alexander Vidal – Ontario Senator and MLA for the United Provinces of Canada
- Frederick Forsyth Pardee – Ontario MPP and MP; Senator
- William Thomas Goodison – MP for Sarnia
