= Lambton (federal electoral district) =

Former federal electoral district in Ontario, Canada

Lambton was a federal electoral district represented in the House of Commons of Canada from 1867 to 1882. It was located in the province of Ontario. It was created by the British North America Act 1867.

The County of Lambton consisted of the Townships of Bosanquet, Warwick, Plympton, Sarnia, Moore, Enniskillen, and Brooke, and the Town of Sarnia.

The electoral district was abolished in 1882 when it was redistributed between Lambton East and Lambton West ridings.

It was represented for those 15 years of operation by Alexander Mackenzie, of the Liberal Party of Canada.

== Members of Parliament ==
This riding has elected the following members of Parliament:

| Parliament | Years | Member | Party |
|---|---|---|---|
| 1st | 1867–1872 | Alexander Mackenzie | Liberal |
| 2nd | 1872–1873 | Alexander Mackenzie | Liberal |
| 2nd | 1873–1874 | Alexander Mackenzie | Liberal |
| 3rd | 1874–1878 | Alexander Mackenzie | Liberal |
| 4th | 1878–1882 | Alexander Mackenzie | Liberal |
Riding dissolved into Lambton West and Lambton East

== Election results ==
1867 Canadian federal election
| Party | Candidate | Votes | Elected |
|---|---|---|---|
| Liberal | Alexander Mackenzie | 1,999 | ✓ |
| Conservative | Alexander Vidal | 1,311 | |
Source: Canadian Elections Database

1872 Canadian federal election
| Party | Candidate | Votes |
|---|---|---|
| Liberal | Alexander Mackenzie | 2,190 |
| Conservative | Alexander Vidal | 1,555 |
Source: Canadian Elections Database

By-election on 25 November 1873 On Mr. Mackenzie being named Minister of Public Works, 7 November 1873
| Party | Candidate | Votes |
| Liberal | Alexander Mackenzie | acclaimed |

1874 Canadian federal election
| Party | Candidate | Votes |
|---|---|---|
| Liberal | Alexander Mackenzie | acclaimed |
lop.parl.ca

1878 Canadian federal election
| Party | Candidate | Votes |
|---|---|---|
| Liberal | Alexander Mackenzie | 2,707 |
| Unknown | J.A. Mackenzie | 2,561 |

== See also ==
- List of Canadian electoral districts
- Historical federal electoral districts of Canada
