= Alexander Vidal =

Canadian politician

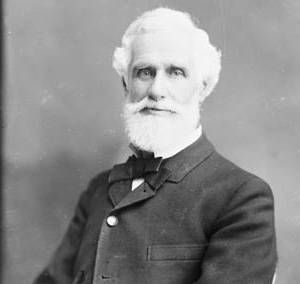
Alexander Vidal Source: Library and Archives Canada

Alexander Vidal (4 August 1819 – 18 December 1906) was an Ontario land surveyor, banker, and political figure. He was a Conservative member of the Senate of Canada for Sarnia division from 1873 to 1906.

He was born in Bracknell, Berkshire, England in 1819, the son of a captain in the Royal Navy. Vidal studied at the Royal Mathematical School at Christ's Hospital in London and came to Upper Canada with his family in 1834. He served in the local militia during the Upper Canada Rebellion and remained in the militia, becoming lieutenant-colonel. He settled in Sarnia and was a provincial land surveyor from 1843 to 1852; he surveyed the town plot for Sault Ste. Marie. Vidal was manager of the Bank of Upper Canada at Sarnia from 1852 to 1866 and of the Bank of Montreal from 1866 to 1875. He also served as treasurer for Lambton County. In 1863, he was elected to the Legislative Council of the Province of Canada for St. Clair division and served until Confederation. Vidal ran unsuccessfully against Alexander Mackenzie in the riding of Lambton for a seat in the House of Commons in 1867 and 1872. In 1873, he was named to the Senate. He was a supporter of the temperance movement. Vidal was an elder of the Canadian Presbyterian Church and was the first president of the Sarnia YMCA.

He died in office at Sarnia in 1906. He is interred in Lakeview Cemetery in Sarnia, Ontario.

1867 Canadian federal election: Lambton
Party	Candidate	Votes	Elected
Liberal	Alexander Mackenzie	1,999	✓
Conservative	Alexander Vidal	1,311	
Source: Canadian Elections Database

1872 Canadian federal election: Lambton
Party	Candidate	Votes
Liberal	Alexander Mackenzie	2,190
Conservative	Alexander Vidal	1,555
Source: Canadian Elections Database
