= Grip Ltd. =

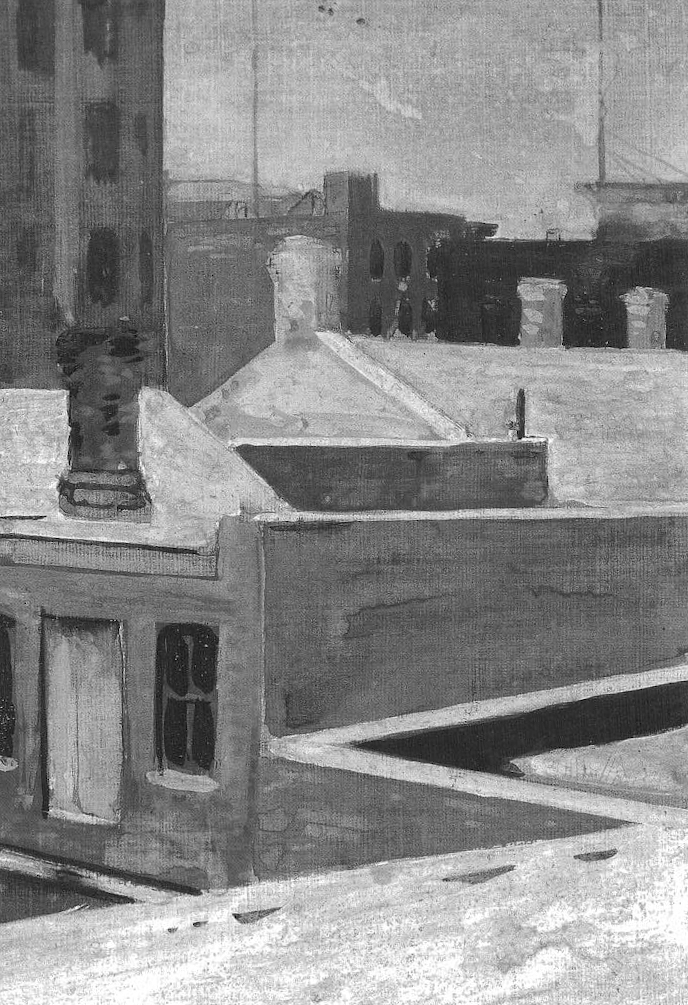
Tom Thomson, View from the Windows of Grip Ltd., c. 1908-10. Gouache and watercolour on paper, 14.9 x 10.2 cm. Private collection

Grip was a Toronto, Ontario design firm that was home to many of Canada's premier designers and painters during the first half of the 20th century.

The company was founded in 1873 by the cartoonist J. W. Bengough to publish his satirical weekly magazine Grip. Bengough also published chapbooks and did design work and advertising for various clients. He lost control of the company in the 1890s and the magazine ceased publication in 1892.

After that date the company became better known as an important design firm, providing artwork, wood cuts, and other services for merchandise and print advertising. In the early 20th century it was technologically and artistically one of the most sophisticated design firms in the country.

It was one of the first employers of many of Canada's major artists of the period, and is perhaps most important as where many of the Group of Seven met one another for the first time. In 1906 J.E.H. Macdonald became its head designer. In 1908 Frank Johnston and around 1909 Tom Thomson joined the firm as two of Macdonald's designers. In 1911 Franklin Carmichael was hired as an office boy. That same year Arthur Lismer crossed the Atlantic to come work for the firm. The year after, Fred Varley made the same journey to work for Grip.

The company was later renamed Rapid Grip. Later it became known as Batten, then Bomac Batten, until it was finally purchased by the Laird Group.

Grip magazine was briefly revived in 2000 as a satirical quarterly, published by the Toronto-based Lategan Media Group.
