= Pacific Scandal =

Canadian political scandal in 1873

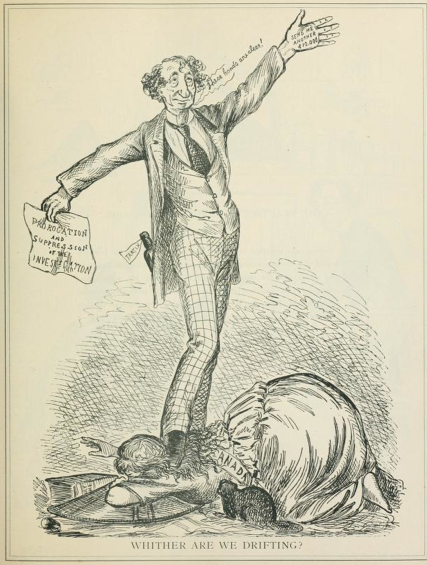
Political cartoon by John Wilson Bengough satirizing Prime Minister John A. Macdonald for the Pacific Scandal

The Pacific Scandal was a political scandal in Canada arising from private interests paying large sums of money to the Conservative Party at a time when the party was in power. The money was said to cover the party's election expenses in the 1872 Canadian federal election but accusations were made that in return, the government influenced the bidding for a national railway construction contract. As part of British Columbia's 1871 agreement to join the Canadian Confederation, the federal government had agreed to build a transcontinental railway linking the seaboard of British Columbia to the other provinces in Eastern and central Canada.

The scandal led to the resignation of Canada's first prime minister, John A. Macdonald, and a transfer of power from his Conservative government to a Liberal government, led by Alexander Mackenzie. One of the new government's first measures was to introduce secret ballots in an effort to improve the integrity of future elections.

After the scandal broke, the railway contract was suspended. An entirely different operation later built the Canadian Pacific Railway from the east to the Pacific.

== Background ==
For a young and loosely defined nation, the building of a national railway is a form of state-making,. In Canada's case it was that and as well an ambitious capitalist venture. The government of Canada, a nascent country with a population of 3.5 million in 1871, lacked the means to exercise meaningful de facto control within the de jure political boundaries of the recently acquired Rupert's Land. Building a transcontinental railway was an important national policy to change that situation. Moreover, after the American Civil War, land-hungry U.S. settlers were pushing that country's frontier westward, exacerbating talk of annexation of Canada. Sentiments of Manifest Destiny were common at the time. in 1867, the year of Canada's Confederation, US Secretary of State William H. Seward surmised that the whole North American continent "shall be, sooner or later, within the magic circle of the American Union." Consequently, the Canadian government considered preventing American involvement in the Canadian railway project to be in Canada's national interest. Thus the government favoured an "all Canadian route" through the rugged Canadian Shield of northern Ontario and refused to consider a less-costly route passing south through Wisconsin and Minnesota south of the international border.

However, a route across the Canadian Shield was expensive and unpopular with potential investors in the United States, Canada and especially Great Britain, the only viable sources of financing. For would-be investors, the objections were primarily based not on politics or nationalism but on economics. At the time, national governments lacked the finances needed to undertake such large projects. For the first transcontinental railroad in the U.S., the government made extensive grants of public land to the railway's builders and induced private financiers to fund the railway on the understanding that they would acquire rich farmland along the route, which could then be sold for profit. However, the eastern section of the proposed Canadian Pacific route, unlike that of the first U.S. transcontinental, was not in rich Nebraskan farmland but deep within the Canadian Shield. An all-Canadian route would require the railway's backers to build hundreds of miles of track across rugged shield terrain, with little economic value, at considerable expense before they could access lucrative farmland in Manitoba and the newly created Northwest Territories, which at that time included Alberta and Saskatchewan. Thus, copying the American financing model seemed impractical. Financiers who hoped to make a relatively quick profit were not willing to make the long-term commitment that the Canadian geography required.

Nevertheless, Montreal capitalist Hugh Allan, with his syndicate Canada Pacific Railway Company, sought the potentially lucrative charter for the project. The problem lay in that Allan and Macdonald were secretly in cahoots with U.S. financiers George W. McMullen and Jay Cooke, who had investments in a rival undertaking, the Northern Pacific Railroad.

== Scandal ==
Two groups competed for the contract to build the railway, Hugh Allan's Canada Pacific Railway Company and David Lewis Macpherson's Inter-Oceanic Railway Company. On April 2, 1873, Lucius Seth Huntington, a Liberal Member of Parliament, created an uproar in the House of Commons. He announced he had uncovered evidence that Allan and his associates had been granted the Canadian Pacific Railway contract in return for political donations of $360,000.

In 1873, it was public knowledge that Allan had contributed a large sum of money to the Conservative government's re-election campaign of 1872; some sources quote a sum over $360,000. Allan had promised to keep American capital out of the railway deal but had lied to Macdonald over this vital point, as Macdonald later discovered. The Liberal Party, the opposition party in Parliament, accused the Conservatives of having made a tacit agreement to give the contract to Hugh Allan in exchange for money.

In making such allegations, the Liberals and their allies in the press (particularly George Brown's newspaper The Globe) presumed that most of the money had been used to bribe voters in the 1872 election. The secret ballot, which was then considered a novelty, had not yet been introduced in Canada. Although it was illegal to offer, solicit, or accept bribes in exchange for votes, effective enforcement of the prohibition proved impossible.

Despite Macdonald's claims of innocence, evidence came to light showing transfers of money from Allan to Macdonald and some of his political colleagues. Perhaps even more damaging to Macdonald was the Liberals' discovery of a telegram through a former employee of Allan, which was thought to have been stolen from the safe of Allan's lawyer, John Abbott.

The scandal proved fatal to Macdonald's government. Macdonald's control of Parliament had already been tenuous since the 1872 election. Since party discipline was not as strong as it is today, once Macdonald's culpability in the scandal became known, he could no longer expect to retain the confidence of the House of Commons.

Macdonald resigned as prime minister on November 5, 1873. He also offered his resignation as the head of the Conservative Party, but it was not accepted, and he was convinced to stay. Perhaps as a direct result of this scandal, the Conservatives fell in the eyes of the public and were relegated to the Official Opposition status in the federal election of 1874, in which secret ballots were used for the first time. The election gave Alexander Mackenzie a firm mandate to succeed Macdonald as Canada's new prime minister.

Despite the short-term defeat, the scandal was not a mortal wound to Macdonald, the Conservative Party, or the construction of the Canadian Pacific Railway. The Long Depression gripped Canada shortly after Macdonald left office, and although the causes of the depression were largely external to Canada, many Canadians blamed Mackenzie for the ensuing hard times. Macdonald returned as prime minister in the 1878 election thanks to his National Policy. He held the office until his death in 1891, and the Canadian Pacific was completed in 1885 while he was still in office, although by a completely different corporation.

== Bibliography ==
- Berton, Pierre (1970). The National Dream: The Great Railway, 1871-1881. Toronto: McClelland and Stewart Limited. ISBN 978-0-7710-1326-3.
- Creighton, Donald (1955). John A. Macdonald: The Old Chieftain, Vol 2: 1867–1891. Toronto: The Macmillan Company of Canada Limited. OCLC 1865227.
- Hutchison, Bruce (1964). Mr. Prime Minister 1867-1964. Don Mills: Longmans Canada.
