= Thomas Phillips Thompson =

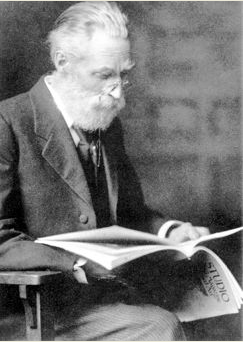
- Born: 25 November 1843; Newcastle upon Tyne, England
- Died: 20 May 1933 (aged 89); Oakville, Ontario, Canada
- Occupation: Journalist

Thomas Phillips Thompson (25 November 1843 – 20 May 1933) was an English-born journalist and humorist who was active in the early socialist movement in Canada.

== Early years ==
Thomas Phillips Thompson was born on 25 November 1843 in Newcastle upon Tyne. He emigrated to Canada with his family in 1857, where they eventually settled in St. Catharines. Thompson studied law, and in 1865 he was admitted to the bar of the province of Ontario as a solicitor. However, he never practiced law, but instead became a journalist.

== Journalist ==
Thompson began writing for the St. Catharines Post. In 1867 he became a police reporter for the Toronto Daily Telegraph, owned by the conservative John Ross Robertson. Around 1870 he began working for the Toronto Mail, where he wrote a weekly political column under the pseudonym "Jimuel Briggs". (Note: His full pseudonym was "Jimuel Briggs, D[ead] B[eat], of Coboconk University.) Jimuel Briggs made fun of the law and of its victims. Thompson gave lectures, and became widely known as a humorist in Ontario. As time went by, Thompson became more pessimistic and demanding, calling for a complete overhaul of the social system, which he expected to come about through violent revolution.

Thompson married Delia Florence Fisher on 2 February 1872, who was then twenty-two years old, from Guelph, from a family of German origin. He left the Mail and founded the Daily City Press, which failed. In 1874 he founded The National, a weekly paper that commented on politics. At first The National supported the Canada First movement, but he turned away from Canada First due to its hostility to trade unions. After 1875 Thompson and The National became concerned with issues related to labor, immigration and other reform causes. Soon afterwards the newspaper stopped publication. Thompson moved to the United States in 1876, where he had a job offer from the Boston Traveller. When the Thompsons moved to Boston their first child was three years old. A second daughter, Laura Beatrice, (Note: Laura Beatrice Thompson became a school teacher in Toronto, then in 1907 accepted a job as a teacher in Dawson City at the age of 29. She met Frank Berton in the nearby mining town of Granville. They married in 1912. Their son was the author Pierre Berton.) was born in Boston on 13 March 1878. Thompson was the literary editor of the Evening Traveller. He also worked for the Boston Courier and American Punch.

Thompson returned to Toronto in 1879 and found work with the Mail, a Liberal-Conservative newspaper, then moved to George Brown's Globe, the organ of the Liberal party. In 1881 The Globe sent him to Ireland as a special correspondent to cover the land campaign of Charles Stewart Parnell. He first met Henry George during this trip. In Ireland, seeing the desperate poverty of the tenant farmers and listening to Parnell making the case for "home rule", he became radicalized. This is evident in his last dispatch to the Globe from Ireland, in which he wrote, "And so, in spite of blunders, and crimes, and defeats - in spite of the greed and self-seeking and the ambitions of the demagogues - through bloodshed, and tears, and suffering, the cause of the people will prevail by slow degrees, and the accumulated and buttressed wrongs of centuries be overthrown." After returning to Toronto he was given an editorial position with the Globe from 1881 to 1883, then with the News from 1884 to 1888.

== Radical ==
The Toronto News was a reform newspaper that supported the Knights of Labor. Thompson also wrote many articles for Knights' journal The Palladium of Labor. He signed these articles "Enjolras", after a character from Victor Hugo's Les Miserables. In 1886, he joined a local assembly of the Knights in Toronto. That year he was an official delegate to the 1886 convention of the Canadian Trades and Labor Congress. He became the leading socialist intellectual and supporter of labor in Canada.

Thompson published The Politics of Labor in 1887, an influential critique of the labor movement.

For a short period (1890–91) he edited the radical weekly Labor Advocate. He used the paper to push for local reforms such as public ownership of the Toronto street railway.

In 1892 and 1893 Thompson ran for election as a labor candidate, under the Liberal banner, in the Ontario provincial legislature, but was not elected.

For a period he advocated the land reforms proposed by Henry George. He was against monopolies, in favor of political involvement by workers, but did not support strikes. He was hostile to corruption, particularly in local politics, and was in favor of public ownership of utilities. In the 1890s he spent a year in France, England and Scotland with his family, sending reports to the Globe and the Mail that called for radical reform to a system in which the idle rich lived off the toil of the workers.

Thompson's radical views and his drift toward outright socialism made it hard for him to get regular work with the mainstream newspapers in Canada. The family was usually short of money. Delia Thompson died in 1897 at the age of forty-seven. Two years after his wife's death Thompson married her sister Edith, who was thirteen years younger. In 1901 they had a son, Phillips Whitman. In the later 1890s and in the early 1900s Thompson was employed by different provincial government departments as a writer, and also wrote for the legislature. In 1900, due to his reputation as a labor spokesman, he was made the Toronto correspondent for the Department of Labour's Labour Gazette, published in Ottawa, holding this position until he retired in 1911.

The Canadian Socialist League (CSL) was formed in Montreal in 1898 by former members of the Socialist Labor Party. The founders rejected the Labor party leadership of Daniel De Leon. Support for the League appeared about the same time in the summer of 1899 in Montreal and Toronto. The Ontario wing of the CSL was organized by George Weston Wrigley and Thompson, both former Knights of Labor, in an effort to pull together the reform forces that had become fragmented after the Patrons of Industry were defeated in the 1896 federal election. George Wrigley suffered a series of strokes in 1904. That year he was involved in the decision of the Ontario branch of the Canadian Socialist League to join the Socialist Party of Canada, which was established early in 1905. Wrigley was supported by Thomas Phillips Thompson in this effort.

Thomas Phillips Thompson spoke and wrote for the socialist movement until the 1920s. He died in Oakville, Ontario on 20 May 1933, aged eighty-nine.

== Publications ==
Publications include:

- Thompson, Thomas Phillips (1864). The Future Government of Canada: Being Arguments in Favor of a British American Independent Republic, Comprising a Refutation of the Position Taken by the Hon. T. D'Arcy McGee in the British American Magazine, for a Monarchical Form of Government. H.F. Leavenworth "Herald" Power Press. p. 24.
- Thompson, Thomas Phillips (1873). The Political Experiences of Jimuel Briggs, D.B., at Toronto, Ottawa and Elsewhere. Flint, Morton & Company. p. 126.
- Thompson, Thomas Phillips; Atherton, Jay (1975) [1887]. The Politics of Labor. With an Introd. by Jay Atherton. University of Toronto Press. p. 264.
- Thompson, Thomas Phillips (1995). "Thoughts and Suggestions on the Social Problem and Things in General (1888-1889)". Labour/Le Travail. 35: 237–272.
- Thompson, Thomas Phillips (1892). The labor reform songster. Philadelphia: Journal of the Knights of Labor. pp. 35.

== Sources ==
- Cook, Ramsay (1994-01-01). "Wrigley, George Weston". Dictionary of Canadian Biography. Springer Science & Business Media. ISBN 978-0-8020-3998-9.
- Hardt, Hanno; Brennen, Bonnie (1995). Newsworkers: Toward a History of the Rank and File. U of Minnesota Press. ISBN 978-0-8166-2706-6.
- Heron, Craig (2008-01-24). "Thomas Phillips Thompson". The Canadian Encyclopedia. Toronto: Historica Canada.
- Kealey, Gregory S.; Palmer, Bryan D. (2004-04-05). Dreaming of What Might Be: The Knights of Labor in Ontario, 1880-1900. Cambridge University Press. ISBN 978-0-521-54571-6.
- Laidler, Harry W. (2013-07-04). History of Socialism: An Historical Comparative Study of Socialism, Communism, Utopia. Routledge. ISBN 978-1-136-23150-6.
- McKay, Ian (2005). Rebels, Reds, Radicals: Rethinking Canada's Left History. Between The Lines. ISBN 978-1-896357-97-3.
- Mckillop, Brian (2011-06-22). Pierre Berton: A Biography. McClelland & Stewart. ISBN 978-1-55199-622-6.
- Milne, J. M. (1973). "History of the Socialist Party of Canada" (PDF). World Socialist Movement.
- "Phillips Thompson fonds". Archives Canada.
- Vann, Jerry Don; Van Arsdel, Rosemary T. (1996). Periodicals of Queen Victoria's Empire: An Exploration. University of Toronto Press. ISBN 978-0-8020-0810-7.

Cetegory:Georgist activists
