= 1874 Canadian federal election =

- January 22, 1874

206 seats in the House of Commons 104 seats needed for a majority
- Turnout: 69.6% (▼0.7 pp)
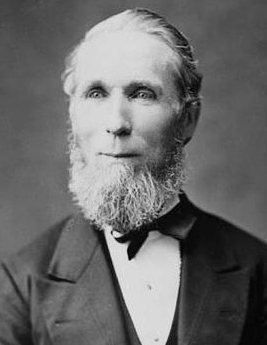

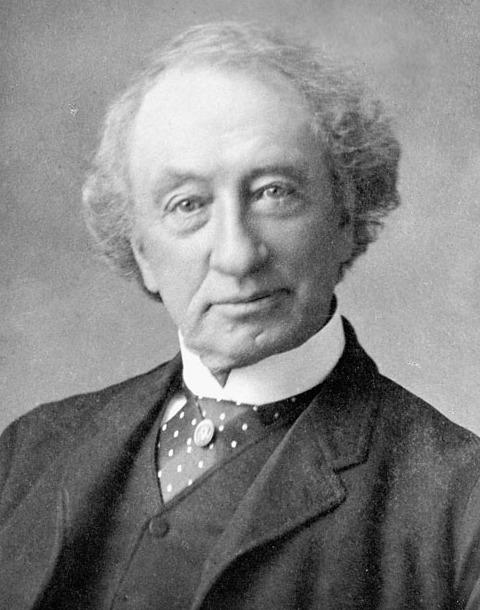
	First party	Second party
Leader	Alexander Mackenzie	John A. Macdonald
Party	Liberal	Conservative
Leader since	March 6, 1873	July 1, 1867
Leader's seat	Lambton	Kingston
Last election	95 seats, 34.7%	100 seats, 38.7%
Seats won	129	65
Seat change	▲35	▼35
Popular vote	128,455	97,925
Percentage	39.5%	30.1%
Swing	▲4.8 pp	▼8.6 pp
- 1874 Canadian electoral map

- The Canadian parliament after the 1874 election
Prime Minister before election
Alexander Mackenzie
Liberal
Prime Minister after election
Alexander Mackenzie
Liberal

The 1874 Canadian federal election was held on January 22, 1874, to elect members of the House of Commons of Canada of the 3rd Parliament of Canada. Sir John A. Macdonald, who had recently been forced out of office as prime minister, and his Conservatives were defeated by the Liberal Party under their new leader Prime Minister Alexander Mackenzie. Macdonald's government had been forced to resign on November 5, 1873, because of allegations of corruption relating to the construction of the Canadian Pacific Railway (see the Pacific Scandal). The Tories were unable to recover from the scandal and lost the next election.

The Liberals under Mackenzie had formed a government on November 7 and then called an election for January.

The election was the first general election after Prince Edward Island's entry into Confederation.

Mackenzie was a reformer, and the 1874 election was the first Canadian election to use secret ballots. He promised to reform election laws in other ways too, including the introduction of simultaneous voting (all seats filled at once instead of successively in a long-drawn-out election period), judicial consideration of contested elections, and extension of the franchise. He also made most important pledges concerning railway projects.

Louis Riel, former leader of the Red River rebellion, was elected as an Independent in Manitoba in 1874 but never took his seat.

== National results ==

3rd Parliament
Party	Party leader	# of candidates	Seats			Popular vote		
Party	Party leader	# of candidates	1872	Elected	Change	#	%	Change
Liberal	Alexander Mackenzie	140	95	129	+35.8%	128,455	39.49%	+4.77pp
Conservative	John A. Macdonald	65	63	39	-38.1%	57,691	17.74%	-8.02pp
Liberal-Conservative^{1}	John A. Macdonald	38	36	26	-27.8%	40,234	12.37%	-0.53pp
Conservative Labour		1	1	-	-100%	1,515	0.47%	+0.02pp
Independents		7	1	4	+300%	10,453	3.21%	+1.58pp
Independent Liberal		5	2	5	+300%	6,541	2.01%	+0.37pp
Independent Conservative		3	2	3	+50%	2,360	0.73%	+0.03pp
Unknown		104	-	-	-	78,008	23.98%	+1.78pp
Total		355	200	206	+3.0%	325,247	100%	
Source: Parliamentary website, Detailed riding results

Notes:

^{1} Liberal-Conservatives sat with the Conservative caucus in the House of Commons.

Acclamations

The following Members of Parliament were elected by acclamation;

- Ontario: 1 Liberal-Conservative, 13 Liberals
- Quebec: 10 Conservatives, 4 Liberal-Conservatives, 15 Liberals
- New Brunswick: 1 Conservative, 3 Liberals, 1 Independent Liberal
- Nova Scotia: 5 Liberals
- Prince Edward Island: 2 Liberals

== Results by province ==
Party name		BC	MB	ON	QC	NB	NS	PEI	Total
Liberal	Seats	3	1	61	34	10	15	5	129
Liberal	Popular vote	34.1	47.0	39.6	34.8	47.1	38.1	56.8	39.5
Conservative	Seats	1	1	15	17	2	2	1	39
Conservative	Vote	4.5	13.8	19.5	17.6	6.8	17.8	17.5	17.7
Liberal-Conservative	Seats	1		10	12	1	2	-	26
Liberal-Conservative	Vote	16.9		10.4	14.9	8.6	19.2	15.4	12.4
Conservative Labour	Seats			-					-
Conservative Labour	Vote			0.9					0.5
Unknown	Seats								
Unknown	Vote	29.2	13.8	27.2	27.5	19.9	9.0	10.3	24.0
Independent	Seats		1	-	-	2	1		4
Independent	Vote		9.5	0.8	2.3	17.6	7.7		3.2
Independent Liberal	Seats	1		2		1	1		5
Independent Liberal	Vote	15.4		1.7			8.2		2.0
Independent Conservative	Seats		1		2				3
Independent Conservative	Vote		15.9		2.9				0.7
Total seats		6	4	88	65	16	21	6	206

== See also ==
- List of Canadian federal general elections
