= 1878 Canadian federal election =

- September 17, 1878

206 seats in the House of Commons 104 seats needed for a majority
- Turnout: 69.1% (▼0.5 pp)

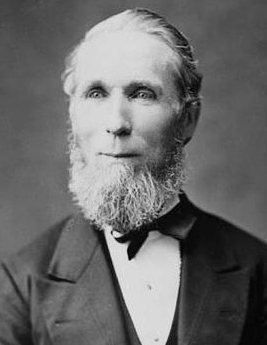
	First party	Second party
Leader	John A. Macdonald	Alexander Mackenzie
Party	Conservative	Liberal
Leader since	July 1, 1867	March 6, 1873
Leader's seat	Victoria (Note: Macdonald also ran in Kingston (where he was defeated) and Marquette (where he was elected); as his appointment as Prime Minister meant he was required by convention at the time to vacate his seat and run again, he chose to stand again in Victoria rather than Marquette.)	Lambton
Last election	65 seats, 30.1%	129 seats, 39.5%
Seats won	134	63
Seat change	▲69	▼66
Popular vote	229,191	180,074
Percentage	42.06%	33.05%
Swing	▲11.96 pp	▼6.45 pp
- 1878 Canadian electoral map

- The Canadian Parliament after the 1878 election
Prime Minister before election
Alexander Mackenzie
Liberal
Prime Minister after election
John A. Macdonald
Conservative

The 1878 Canadian federal election was held on September 17, 1878, to elect members of the House of Commons of the 4th Parliament of Canada. It resulted in the end of Prime Minister Alexander Mackenzie's Liberal government after only one term in office. Canada suffered an economic depression during Mackenzie's term, and his party was punished by voters for it. The Liberals' policy of free trade also hurt their support with the business establishment in Toronto and Montreal.

Sir John A. Macdonald and his Conservative Party were returned to power after having been defeated four years before amidst scandals over the building of the Canadian Pacific Railway.

== Electoral System ==
First past the post was used to elect in single-member ridings. The Halifax riding elected two MPs, using plurality block voting.

Secret voting, with the paper "Australian ballot", was used in this election for the first time.

== National results ==

Party	Party leader	# of candidates	Seats			Popular vote		
Party	Party leader	# of candidates	1874	Elected	Change	#	%	Change
Conservative	John A. Macdonald	101	38	85	+118.4%	143,192	26.28%	+7.80pp
Liberal-Conservative	John A. Macdonald	60	26	49	+76.9%	85,999	15.78%	+3.50pp
Liberal	Alexander Mackenzie	121	126	63	-54.8%	180,074	33.05%	-7.74pp
Independent		11	4	5	+25%	14,783	2.71%	-0.48pp
Independent Conservative		2	2	2	-	1,001	0.18%	-0.76pp
Unknown		117	-			114,043	20.93%	-1.93pp
Independent Liberal		4	1	1	+100%	5,388	0.99%	-
Nationalist Conservative		1	*	1	*	401	0.07%	*
Total		417	197	206	+3.6%	544,881	100.0%	-
Sources: http://www.elections.ca -- History of Federal Ridings since 1867

Note:

* Party did not nominate candidates in the previous election.

Acclamations

The following Members of Parliament were elected by acclamation;

- British Columbia: 1 Conservative, 1 Liberal-Conservative
- Manitoba: 2 Conservatives, 1 Liberal-Conservative
- Quebec: 1 Conservative, 2 Liberal-Conservatives, 1 Liberal
- New Brunswick: 1 Liberal, 1 Independent

== Results by province ==
Party name		BC	MB	ON	QC	NB	NS	PE	Total
Conservative	Seats:	1	2	37	33	1	8	3	85
Conservative	Popular vote (%):	-	49.6	25.5	35.0	5.9	21.7	31.6	26.3
Liberal-Conservative	Seats:	2	1	23	12	3	6	2	49
Liberal-Conservative	Vote (%):	39.6	-	15.8	13.2	14.3	22.7	12.0	15.8
Liberal	Seats:	2		27	17	9	7	1	63
Liberal	Vote (%):	-		36.3	21.7	48.2	34.9	37.2	33.1
Independent	Seats:	1		1	1	2	-		5
Independent	Vote (%):	12.2		1.5	1.6	13.1	4.3		2.7
Independent Conservative	Seats:		1		1				2
Independent Conservative	Vote (%):		50.4		0.7				0.2
Unknown	Seats:								
Unknown	Vote (%):	48.2		19.9	27.4	14.8	14.7	19.3	20.9
Independent Liberal	Seats:					1	-		1
Independent Liberal	Vote (%):			1.0		3.7	1.7		1.0
Nationalist Conservative	Seats:				1		-		1
Nationalist Conservative	Vote (%):				0.3				0.1
Total seats		6	4	88	65	16	21	6	206

== See also ==
- List of Canadian federal general elections
- 4th Canadian Parliament
