= Alexander Mackenzie (politician) =

Prime Minister of Canada from 1873 to 1878

The Honourable Alexander Mackenzie PC
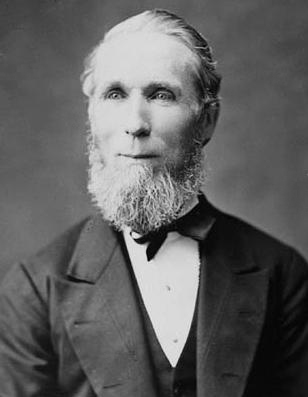
- Mackenzie in 1878

2nd Prime Minister of Canada
- In office November 7, 1873 – October 8, 1878
- Monarch: Victoria
- Governor General: The Earl of Dufferin
- Preceded by: John A. Macdonald
- Succeeded by: John A. Macdonald

Leader of the Opposition
- In office October 17, 1878 – April 27, 1880
- Preceded by: John A. Macdonald
- Succeeded by: Edward Blake
- In office March 6, 1873 – November 5, 1873
- Preceded by: Position established
- Succeeded by: John A. Macdonald

Leader of the Liberal Party
- In office March 6, 1873 – May 4, 1880
- Preceded by: Edward Blake
- Succeeded by: Edward Blake

Member of Parliament
- In office September 20, 1867 – April 17, 1892
- Preceded by: Riding established
- Succeeded by: William Findlay Maclean
- Constituency: Lambton (1867–1882); York East (1882–1892)

Personal details
- Born: January 28, 1822 Logierait, Scotland
- Died: April 17, 1892 (aged 70) Toronto, Ontario, Canada
- Resting place: Lakeview Cemetery, Sarnia, Ontario
- Party: Liberal
- Spouses: Helen Neil (m. 1845; died 1852) Jane Sym (m. 1853)
- Children: 3

Military service
- Allegiance: Canada
- Branch/service: Canadian militia
- Years of service: 1866–1874
- Rank: Major
- Unit: 27th (Lambton) Battalion of Infantry
- Battles/wars: Fenian Raids

Alexander Mackenzie (January 28, 1822 – April 17, 1892) was a Scottish-Canadian stonemason and politician who served as the second prime minister of Canada from 1873 to 1878. He led the Liberal Party from 1873 to 1880 and was the first Liberal prime minister. He was also a member of Parliament (MP) from 1867 to 1892.

Mackenzie was born in Logierait, Perthshire, Scotland. He left school at the age of 13, following his father's death, to help his widowed mother, and trained as a stonemason. Mackenzie immigrated to the Province of Canada when he was 19, settling in what became Ontario. His masonry business prospered, allowing him to pursue other interests – such as the editorship of a pro-Reformist newspaper called the Lambton Shield. Mackenzie was elected to the Legislative Assembly of the Province of Canada in 1862, as a supporter of George Brown.

In 1867, Mackenzie was elected to the new House of Commons of Canada for the Liberal Party. He became leader of the party (and thus leader of the Opposition) in mid-1873, and a few months later, following John A. Macdonald's resignation in the aftermath of the Pacific Scandal, he succeeded Macdonald as prime minister. Mackenzie and the Liberals won a majority government in the 1874 federal election. He was popular among the general public for his humble background and consistent democratic principles.

As prime minister, Mackenzie continued the nation-building program which began under his predecessor. His government introduced the secret ballot, established the Supreme Court of Canada and Royal Military College of Canada, enacted the Indian Act, and created the District of Keewatin to better administer Canada's newly acquired western territories. It struggled to deal with the aftermath of the Panic of 1873 and made limited progress on the transcontinental railway. Mackenzie's Liberals were defeated in the 1878 federal election. He remained leader of the Liberal Party for another two years, and continued on as an MP until his death from a stroke.

== Early life ==
Mackenzie was born on January 28, 1822, in Logierait, Perthshire, Scotland, the son of Mary Stewart (Fleming) and Alexander Mackenzie Sr. (born 1784) who were married in 1817. The site of his birthplace is known as Clais-'n-deoir (the Hollow of the Weeping), where families said their goodbyes as the convicted were led to nearby Gallows Hill. The house in which he was born was built by his father. He was the third of 10 boys, seven of whom survived infancy. Alexander Mackenzie Sr. was a carpenter and ship's joiner who had to move around frequently for work after the end of the Napoleonic Wars in 1815. Mackenzie's father died on March 7, 1836. Alexander Mackenzie Jr. was then forced to end his formal education at 13 years old to help support his family. He apprenticed as a stonemason and met his future wife, Helen Neil. They met in Irvine, where her father was also a stonemason. The Neils were Baptist and shortly thereafter, Mackenzie converted from Presbyterianism to Baptist beliefs. In 1842, the couple and her family immigrated to Canada to seek a better life. Mackenzie's faith linked him to the increasingly influential temperance cause. The cause was particularly strong in Canada West (now Ontario) and this would become a constituency which he represented in the House of Commons.

Mackenzie, Helen, and her family settled in Kingston, Canada West. The limestone in the area proved too hard for his stonemason tools, and not having money to buy new tools, Mackenzie took a job as a labourer constructing a building on Princess Street. The contractor on the job claimed financial difficulty, so Mackenzie accepted a promissory note for summer wages. The note later proved to be worthless. Subsequently, Mackenzie won a contract building a bomb-proof arch at Fort Henry. He later became a foreman on the construction of Kingston's four Martello Towers – Murney Tower, Fort Frederick, Cathcart Tower, and Shoal Tower. He was also a foreman on the construction of the Welland Canal and the Lachine Canal. While working on the Beauharnois Canal, a one-ton stone fell and crushed one of his legs. He recovered, but never regained the strength in that leg.

While in Kingston, Mackenzie became a vocal opponent of religious and political entitlement and corruption in government.

Mackenzie was a Baptist and a teetotaller. He was known as a prankster (stuffed chimney on young in-laws; rolled boulder down Thunder Cape towards friend A. McKellar; burned Tory campaign placards in hotel woodstove early in morning). He took pride in his Scottish heritage.

Mackenzie married Helen Neil (1826–1852) in 1845. The couple moved to Sarnia, Canada West, in 1847. Helen gave birth to three children but only their girl, Mary (1848), had survived infancy. They were soon joined from Scotland by the rest of Mackenzie's brothers and his mother. He began working as a general contractor, earning a reputation for being a hard-working and honest man, with a working man's view on fiscal policy. Mackenzie helped construct many courthouses and jails across southern Ontario. A number of these still stand today, including the Sandwich Courthouse and Jail now known as the Mackenzie Hall Cultural Centre in Windsor, Ontario, and the Kent County Courthouse and Jail in Chatham, Ontario. He even bid, unsuccessfully, on the construction of the Parliament buildings in Ottawa in 1859.

Helen died in 1852, finally succumbing to the effects of excessive doses of mercury-based calomel used to treat a fever while in Kingston. In 1853, he married Jane Sym (1825–1893).

Mackenzie served as a Major in the 27th Lambton Battalion of Infantry from 1866 to 1874, serving on active duty during the Fenian Raids in 1870.

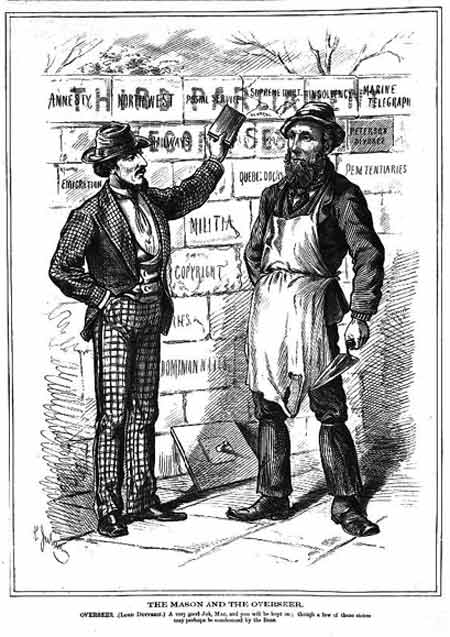
An 1875 Canadian Illustrated News cartoon shows Mackenzie the Mason and Governor General Lord Dufferin the Overseer.

== Early political involvement ==
Mackenzie involved himself in politics soon after arriving in Canada. He fought passionately for equality and the elimination of all forms of class distinction. In 1851, he became the secretary for the Reform Party for Lambton. George Brown, who was the owner of the Reformist paper The Globe convinced Mackenzie to run in Kent/Lambton. Mackenzie campaigned relentlessly for the 1851 election, helping Brown to win his first seat in the Legislative Assembly. Mackenzie and Brown remained close friends and colleagues for the rest of their lives.

In 1852, Mackenzie became editor of another reformist paper, the Lambton Shield. As an editor, Mackenzie was perhaps a little too vocal, leading the paper to a lawsuit for libel against the local conservative candidate. Because a key witness claimed Cabinet Confidence and would not testify, the paper lost the suit and was forced to fold due to financial hardship.

Alexander Mackenzie was petitioned to run after his brother, Hope Mackenzie declined to run for re-election. Alexander won his first seat in the Legislative Assembly as a supporter of George Brown in 1861. In 1865, Brown resigned from the Great Coalition over negotiations of a reciprocity trade treaty with the United States. This led to Mackenzie being invited to be president of the council. Wary of Macdonald's motivations and true to his principles, Mackenzie declined.

He entered the House of Commons of Canada in 1867, representing the Lambton constituency. No cohesive national Liberal Party of Canada existed at the time, and with Brown losing his seat, no official leader emerged. Mackenzie was asked but did not believe he was the best qualified for the position. Although he resisted offers of the position, he nevertheless sat as the de facto leader of the Official Opposition.

== Prime Minister (1873–1878) ==
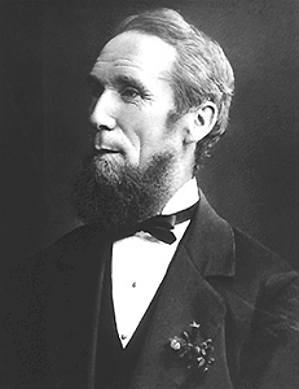
Mackenzie in 1873.

When the Macdonald government fell due to the Pacific Scandal in 1873, the Governor General, Lord Dufferin, called upon Mackenzie, who had been chosen as leader of the Liberal Party a few months earlier, to form a new government. Mackenzie formed a government and asked the governor general to call an election for January 1874. The Liberals won a majority of the seats in the House of Commons having garnered 40% of the popular vote.

Mackenzie remained prime minister until the 1878 election when Macdonald's Conservatives returned to power.

For a man of Mackenzie's humble origins to attain such a position was unusual in an age which generally offered such opportunity only to the privileged. Lord Dufferin expressed early misgivings about a stonemason taking over government, but on meeting Mackenzie, Dufferin revised his opinions:

However narrow and inexperienced Mackenzie may be, I imagine he is a thoroughly upright, well-principled, and well-meaning man.

— Lord Dufferin

Mackenzie served concurrently as Minister of Public Works and oversaw the completion of the Parliament buildings. While drawing up the plans for the West Block, he included a circular staircase leading directly from his office to the outside of the building, which allowed him to escape the patronage-seekers waiting for him in his ante-chamber. Proving Dufferin's reflections on his character to be true, Mackenzie disliked intensely the patronage inherent in politics. Nevertheless, he found it a necessary evil to maintain party unity and ensure the loyalty of his fellow Liberals.

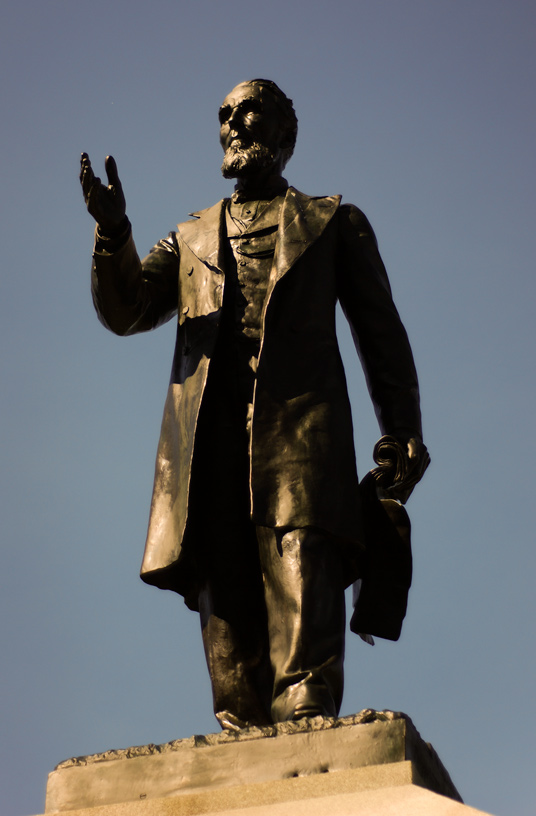
Statue of Alexander Mackenzie on Parliament Hill, Ottawa by Hamilton MacCarthy

In keeping with his democratic ideals, Mackenzie refused the offer of a knighthood three times, and was thus the only one of Canada's first eight Prime Ministers not to be knighted. He also declined appointment to the UK Privy Council and hence does not bear the title "Right Honourable". His pride in his working class origins never left him. Once, while touring Fort Henry as prime minister, he asked the soldier accompanying him if he knew the thickness of the wall beside them. The embarrassed escort confessed that he didn't and Mackenzie replied, "I do. It is five feet, ten inches. I know, because I built it myself!"

As Prime Minister, Alexander Mackenzie strove to reform and simplify the machinery of government, achieving a remarkable record of reform legislation. He introduced the secret ballot; advised the creation of the Supreme Court of Canada; the establishment of the Royal Military College of Canada in Kingston in 1874 and the creation of the Office of the Auditor General in 1878. He completed the Intercolonial Railway, but struggled to progress on the national railway due to a worldwide economic depression, almost coming to blows with Governor General Lord Dufferin over imperial interference. Mackenzie stood up for the rights of Canada as a nation and fought for the supremacy of Parliament and honesty in government. Above all else, he was known and loved for his honesty and integrity.

However, his term was marked by economic depression that had grown out of the Panic of 1873, which Mackenzie's government was unable to alleviate. In 1874, Mackenzie negotiated a new free trade agreement with the United States, eliminating the high protective tariffs in place on Canadian goods in US markets. However, this action did not bolster the economy, and construction of the CPR slowed drastically due to lack of funding. In 1876, the Conservative opposition announced a National Policy of protective tariffs, which resonated with voters. When an election was called in 1878, the Liberals got slightly more than a third of the vote, and the Conservatives with 42 percent of the votes came back into power.

== Supreme Court appointments ==
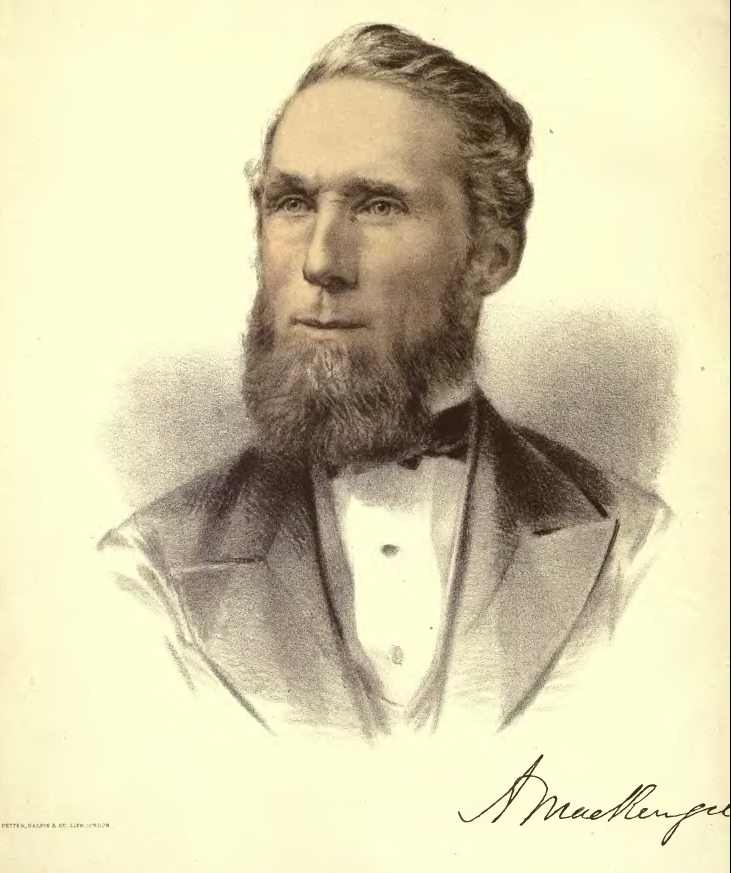
A painting of Mackenzie

Mackenzie chose the following jurists to be appointed as justices of the Supreme Court of Canada by the Governor General:

- Sir William Buell Richards (Chief Justice) – September 30, 1875
- Télesphore Fournier – September 30, 1875
- William Alexander Henry – September 30, 1875
- Sir William Johnstone Ritchie – September 30, 1875
- Sir Samuel Henry Strong – September 30, 1875
- Jean-Thomas Taschereau – September 30, 1875
- Sir Henri Elzéar Taschereau – October 7, 1878

== Later life ==
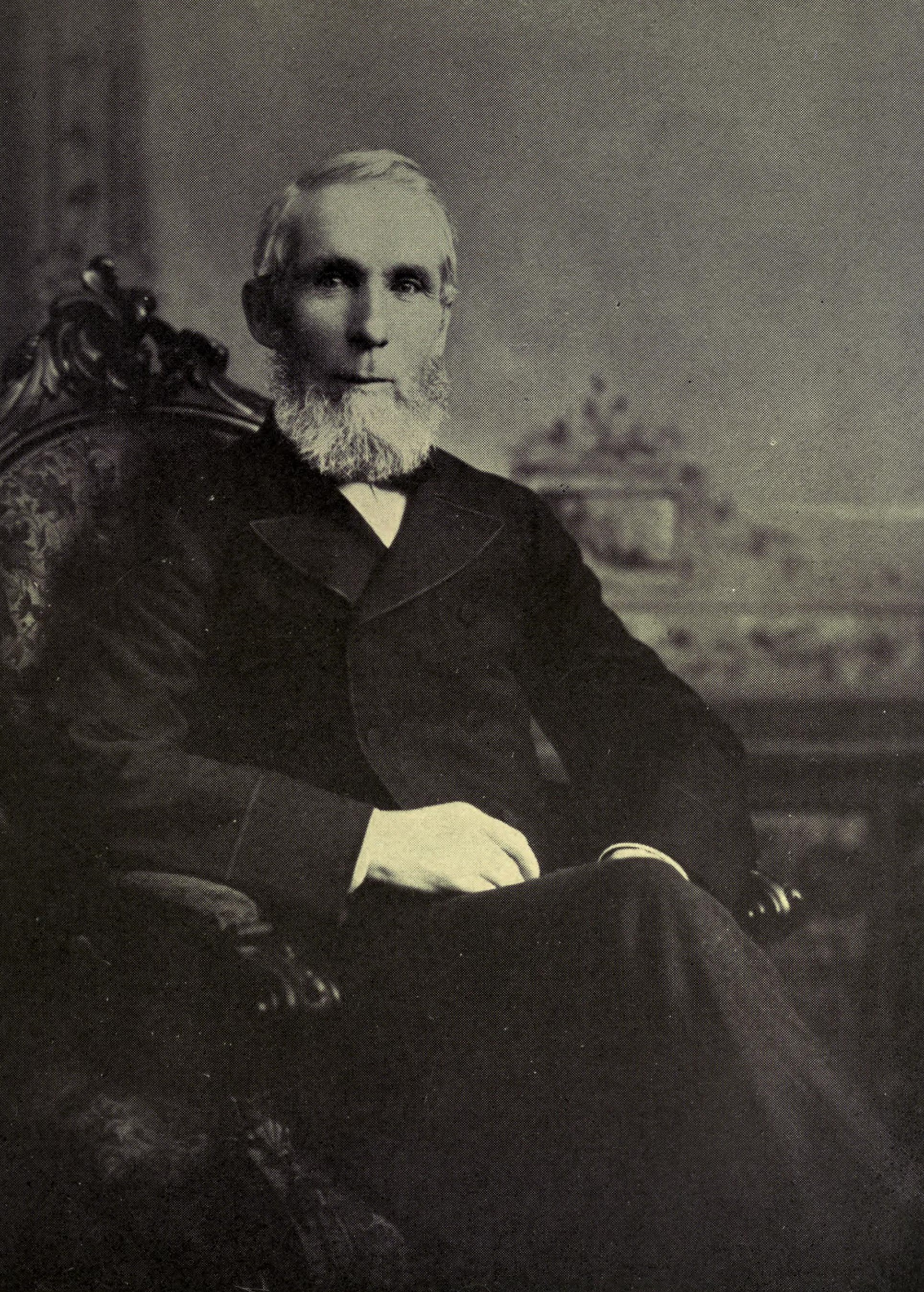
Mackenzie after his premiership.

Despite his government's defeat, he retained the East York seat and remained Leader of the Opposition for another two years, until 1880. In 1881, he became the first president of The North American Life Assurance Company.

He was soon struck with a mysterious strange ailment that sapped his strength and all but took his voice. Although sitting in silence in the House of Commons, he held his House of Commons East York seat until his death in 1892.

He suffered a stroke after hitting his head during a fall in 1892. He died on April 17 in Toronto at the age of seventy. A funeral took place at Jarvis Street Baptist Church in Toronto, and again at St. Andrew's Church and burial in Lakeview Cemetery in Sarnia, Ontario.

== Legacy ==
In their 1999 study of the prime ministers of Canada, which included the results of a survey of Canadian historians, J. L. Granatstein and Norman Hillmer found that Mackenzie was in 11th place just after John Sparrow David Thompson.

=== Namesakes ===
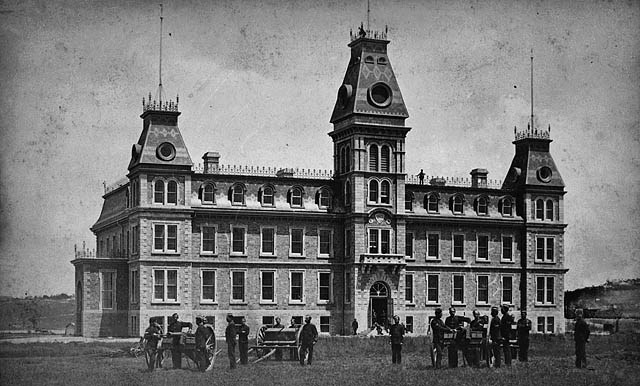
Mackenzie Building at the Royal Military College of Canada

The following are named in honour of Alexander Mackenzie:

- The Mackenzie Mountain Range in the Yukon and Northwest Territories
- Mount Mackenzie, in the Selkirk Mountains of British Columbia
- The Mackenzie Building, and the use of the Mackenzie tartan by the bands at the Royal Military College of Canada in Kingston, Ontario, "Alexander Mackenzie", the Royal Military College of Canada March for bagpipes, was composed in his honour by Pipe Major Don M. Carrigan, who was the College Pipe Major 1973 to 1985.
- Mackenzie Hall in Windsor, Ontario
- Alexander Mackenzie Scholarships in Economics and Political Science at McGill University and the University of Toronto
- Alexander MacKenzie Park in Sarnia, Ontario
- Alexander Mackenzie High School in Sarnia
- Alexander Mackenzie Housing Co-Operative Inc. in Sarnia
- Mackenzie Avenue, Ottawa, Ontario
- Mackenzie Tower, West Block, Parliament Hill, Ottawa, Ontario

=== Other honours ===
- A monument is dedicated to his tomb in Lakeview Cemetery, Sarnia, Ontario
- "Honourable Alexander Mackenzie" (1964) by Lawren Harris, head of the Department of Fine Arts, Mount Allison University, now hangs in the Mackenzie Building, Royal Military College of Canada. The unveiling ceremony was performed by the Right Honourable Louis St. Laurent, a Canadian former prime minister, and the gift was accepted by the Commandant, Air Commodore L.J. Birchall. The painting was commissioned in memory of No. 244, Lieut.-Col, F.B. Wilson, O.B.E., her deceased husband, by Mrs, F.W. Dashwood. Also taking part in the ceremony was the Honourable Paul Hellyer, Minister of National Defence, President and Chancellor of the college. In attendance was Mrs. Burton R. Morgan of Ottawa, great-granddaughter of Alexander Mackenzie.
- Burgess tickets presented to Alexander Mackenzie in Dundee, Dunkeld, Logierait, Irvine, and Perth Scotland

== See also ==
- List of prime ministers of Canada
- Timeline of the Alexander Mackenzie premiership

Party political offices
Preceded by George Brown	Leader of the Liberal Party of Canada; 1873–1880	Succeeded by Edward Blake
Political offices
Vacant	Leader of the Opposition; 1873	Succeeded by John A. Macdonald
Preceded by John A. Macdonald	Prime Minister of Canada; 1873–1878	Succeeded by John A. Macdonald
Preceded by Hector Louis Langevin	Minister of Public Works; 1873 – 1878	Succeeded by Charles Tupper
Preceded by John A. Macdonald	Leader of the Opposition; 1878–1880	Succeeded by Edward Blake
Parliament of Canada
Preceded by district created	Member of Parliament for Lambton; 1867 – 1882	Succeeded by district abolished
Preceded by Alfred Boultbee	Member of Parliament for York East; 1882 – 1892	Succeeded by William Findlay Maclean
