= Breaking ball =

Baseball pitch that does not travel straight

A common grip of a slider

In baseball, a breaking ball is a pitch that does not travel straight as it approaches the batter but has sideways or downward motion, and sometimes both (see slider). A breaking ball is not a specific pitch, but any pitch that "breaks", such as a curveball, slider, or screwball. A pitcher who primarily uses breaking ball pitches is often called a junkballer.

A breaking ball is more difficult than a straight pitch for a catcher to receive as breaking pitches sometimes hit the ground (whether intentionally, or not) before making it to the plate. A curveball moves down and to the left for a right handed pitcher. For a left hand pitcher, it moves down and to the right. And blocking a breaking ball requires thought and preparation by the catcher. The pitcher then, must have confidence in the catcher, and the catcher in himself, to block any ball in the dirt; if there are runners on base, they will likely advance if the ball gets away from the catcher. (Whether the pitcher is right- or left-handed will dictate which direction the catcher must turn his body to adjust for the spin of an upcoming breaking ball. This necessary movement may reveal the next intended pitch to the batter; therefore an experienced catcher must fake or mask his intentions when preparing for the pitch.)

If a breaking ball fails to break, it is called a "hanging" breaking ball, specifically, a "hanging" curve or even more specifically a "cement mixer" if it is a "hanging" slider that just spins. The "hanger" presents a high, slow pitch that is easy for the batter to see, and often results in an extra-base hit or a home run.

Don Mattingly wrote in Don Mattingly's Hitting Is Simple: The ABC's of Batting .300 that "hitting a breaking ball is one of the toughest things you'll have to learn" due to the ball's very brief window in the strike zone.

== Physics ==
Generally the Magnus effect describes the laws of physics that make a curveball curve. A fastball travels through the air with backspin, which creates a higher pressure zone in the air ahead of and under the baseball. The baseball's raised seams augment the ball's ability to develop a boundary layer and therefore a greater differential of pressure between the upper and lower zones. The effect of gravity is partially counteracted as the ball rides on and into increased pressure. Thus the fastball falls less than a ball thrown without spin (neglecting knuckleball effects) during the 60 feet 6 inches it travels to home plate.

On the other hand, a curveball, thrown with topspin, creates a higher pressure zone on top of the ball, which deflects the ball downward in flight. Instead of counteracting gravity, the curveball adds additional downward force, thereby giving the ball an exaggerated drop in flight.

== History ==
Baseball lore has it that the curveball was invented in the early 1870s by Candy Cummings, though this claim is debatable. An early demonstration of the "skewball" or curveball occurred at the Capitoline Grounds in Brooklyn in August 1870 by Fred Goldsmith. In 1869, a reporter for the New York Clipper described Phonney Martin as an "extremely hard pitcher to hit for the ball never comes in a straight line‚ but in a tantalizing curve." If the observation is true, this would pre-date Cummings and Goldsmith. In 1876, the first known collegiate baseball player to perfect the curveball was Clarence Emir Allen of Western Reserve College, now known as Case Western Reserve University, where he never lost a game. Both Allen and his teammate John P. Barden became famous for employing the curve in the late 1870s. In the early 1880s, Clinton Scollard (1860–1932), a pitcher from Hamilton College in New York, became famous for his curve ball and later earned fame as a prolific American poet. In 1885, St. Nicholas, a children's magazine, featured a story entitled, "How Science Won the Game". It told of how a boy pitcher mastered the curveball to defeat the opposing batters.

The New York Clipper reported, of a September 26, 1863, game at Princeton University (then the College of New Jersey), that F. P. Henry's "slow pitching with a great twist to the ball achieved a victory over fast pitching." By 1866, many Princeton players were pitching and hitting "curved balls".

Harvard President Charles Eliot was among those opposed to the curve, claiming it was a dishonest practice unworthy of Harvard students. At an athletics conference at Yale University in 1884 a speaker (thought to be from Harvard, likely Prof. Charles Eliot Norton, a cousin of the Harvard President) was reported to have stated: "For the pitcher, instead of delivering the ball to the batter in an honest, straightforward way, that the latter may exert his strength to the best advantage in knocking it, now uses every effort to deceive him by curving—I think that is the word—the ball. And this is looked upon as the last triumph of athletic science and skill. I tell you it is time to call halt! when the boasted progress in athletics is in the direction of fraud and deceit."

In the past, major league pitchers Tommy Bridges, Bob Feller, Virgil Trucks, Herb Score, Camilo Pascual and Sandy Koufax were regarded as having outstanding curveballs.

== See also ==
- Swing bowling, a similar concept in cricket
