= Samuel Archer King =

American balloonist (1828–1914)

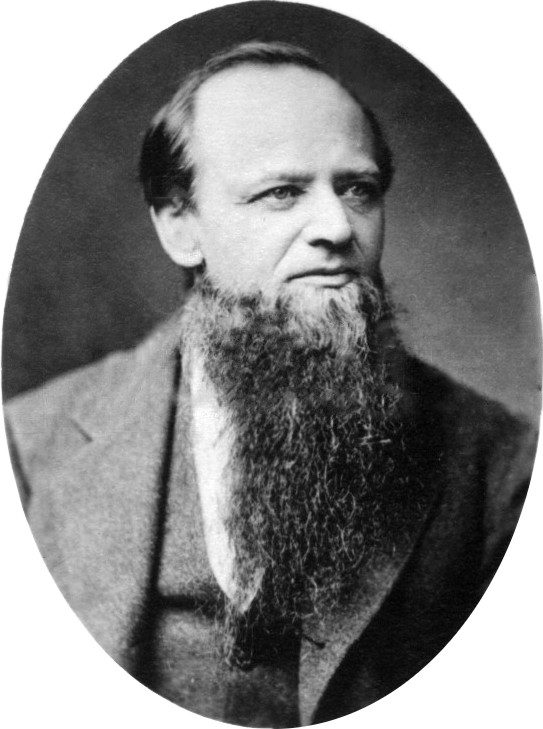
Samuel Archer King

Samuel Archer King (9 April 1828 in Tinicum Township, Pennsylvania – 3 November 1914 in Philadelphia) was a ballooning pioneer in the United States.

== Early interest ==
When a boy, he was fond of climbing to the greatest heights possible, to satisfy his passion for viewing extended landscapes. Soon after attaining his majority, he constructed a balloon. His first ascension was made on 25 September 1851 from Philadelphia. In consequence of a scant supply of gas, it proved only a partial success, and he received rough treatment in the tree tops and in being dragged up the Schuylkill River and over the dam. A second attempt produced a successful voyage across Philadelphia, far into New Jersey.

== Ascension experiences ==
He then made numerous expeditions from various places in Pennsylvania and New Jersey. In 1855 he made several ascents from Wilmington, Delaware, and on 16 June 1856, ascended from Wilkes-Barre, Pennsylvania, but in descending was dashed to the earth and rendered insensible. During 1856-57 he made ascents from Providence, Rhode Island, and other places in New England, and, on 15 August, he went up from New Haven, Connecticut, in his balloon “Queen of the Air,” which subsequently became famous from his ascents made from Boston.

At an ascent on 1 September 1858, he experimented with the use of a drag rope as a guide. In starting, he allowed 75 pounds of rope to trail along the ground. As the balloon gradually became heated by the sun, its buoyant power was increased without discharging ballast, and by the time five miles had been traversed the rope was lifted from the ground, and it continued to be lifted until a height of two miles had been reached. After a passage of nearly thirty miles, the drag rope was detached, and he continued a similar distance farther.

In June 1859, he made an ascent from Charlestown, Massachusetts, landing in Belmont, and on 4 July following he made an ascent from Boston. On another occasion he ascended from Boston Common with a party, and alighted in Melrose, where a long rope was procured, and he treated some of the passengers to a bird's-eye view of the village by moonlight. While the balloon, with five young women, was in the air, it escaped, but after a few miles the descent was safely made.

On 4 July 1868, he made an ascent from Buffalo, New York, with five persons. The start was excellent, but the balloon was carried out over Lake Erie, where, in efforts to navigate it, by means of an undercurrent, to reach the land, the car twice struck the surface of the water. King reached the land, and then began a voyage that finally ended on the top of the Alleghany Mountains late at night. As the balloon struck, the anchor was thrown out, but it rebounded, passing over a tall pine tree, the top branches of which caught the anchor. The rope being comparatively short, the party were not able to reach the ground. The night was dark, and the nature of the surface beneath them was unknown, so they concluded to remain all night in the tree. When daylight came, the anchor rope was cut loose and the balloon landed with perfect safety.

On 19 October 1869, King ascended from Rochester, New York, with his monster balloon the “Hyperion,” in the presence of nearly 50,000 persons, carrying a party of seven. The weather was unfavorable, the wind boisterous, threatening clouds flew across the sky, flurries of snow were frequent, and the cold was searching. In four and a half minutes, although gas had been discharged from the valve, they entered a snow-cloud. The balloon moved at the rate of forty miles an hour, the cold was intense, night came on, and the party were in the midst of a driving snow storm. The weight of snow that collected on the top of the balloon drove it to the ground, and a forced landing in an open field was made in the squall; but the anchor did not hold, and the balloon bounded over a piece of woods, alighting on the other side. Here the anchor held for a while, the gas escaping from the valve, but, unfortunately, two of the party got out of the basket, and the balloon, thus lightened, broke loose and bounded upon a side hill and at last ran against a tree, a huge rent being made in the machine, so that the gas escaped almost instantly. The party had landed near Cazenovia.

During a subsequent series of ascents in the southern states, King had many strange experiences; the people, unfamiliar with such sights, were at a loss to account for his strange descent from the clouds. In February 1870, he ascended from Augusta, Georgia, and after a journey of 130 miles descended, although not until his balloon had become damaged and he had been precipitated to the ground from a height of nearly 60 feet. In July 1872, he ascended from Boston Common, and was carried out to sea, but, after descending until the drag rope trailed through the water, a yacht was met with and the rope tied to its mast. The balloon soon towed the vessel in to the shore and landed.

== Scientific interest ==
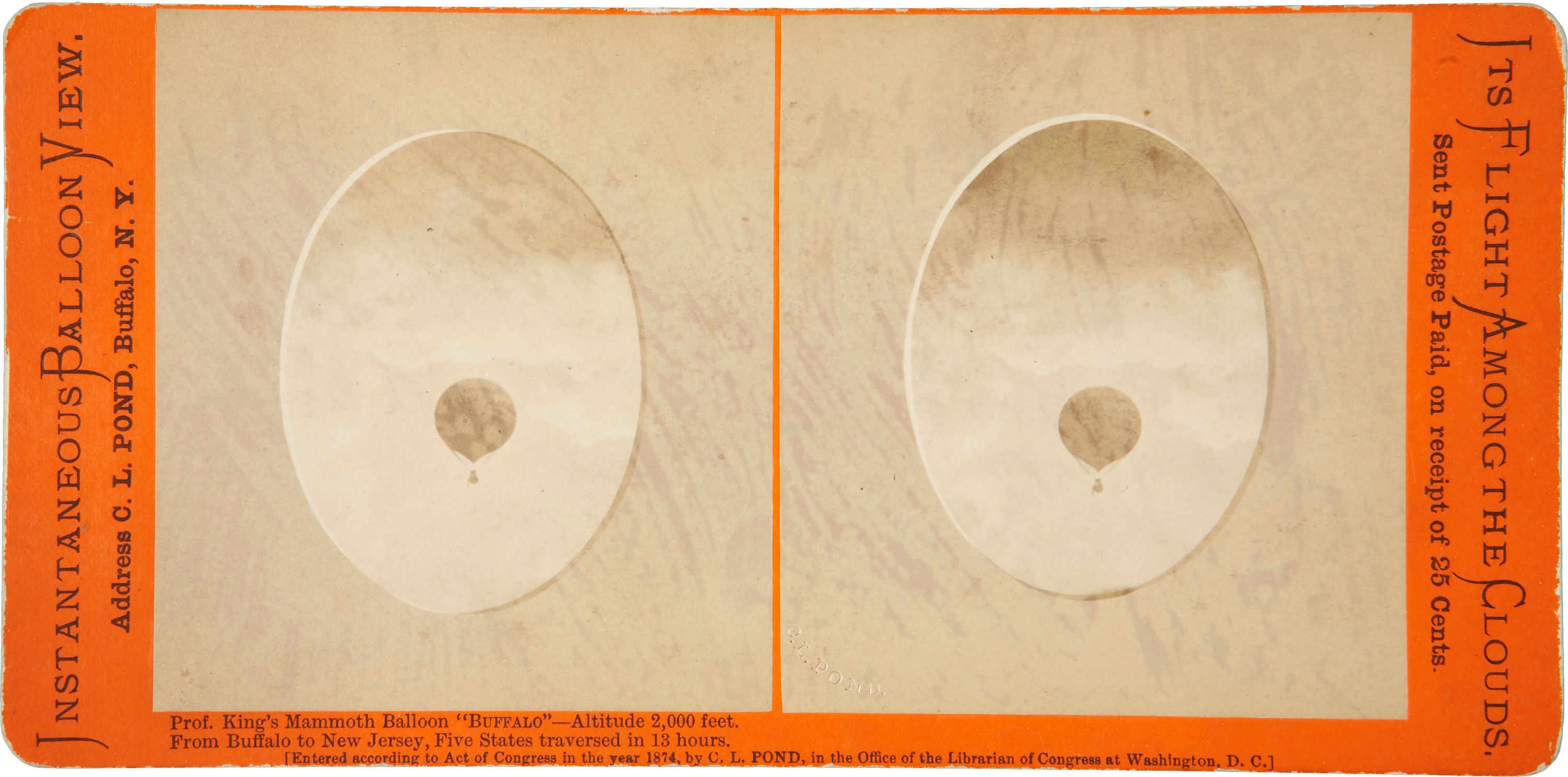
stereoview of King's 1874 flight

King always claimed that the study of meteorology should be pursued with a balloon. For this purpose, during the autumn of 1872, he made several ascensions with officers of the United States Signal Service, and the results of their experience have been published in the Journal of the signal service. At the time of the attempted trip of the New York Daily Graphic balloon, the services of King were called in, and it was through his efforts that the launching was made. (See the article on Washington Harrison Donaldson.) An important excursion was made on 4 July 1874, in King's balloon “Buffalo” from the city of that name. The start was made in the afternoon, the balloon was carried southward during the night, and, following the course of the Susquehanna River until the next morning, the party found themselves over Havre de Grace, Maryland, and as the sun rose a large part of Pennsylvania, Maryland, Virginia, Delaware, and New Jersey was seen. Later a descent was made in New Jersey.

In September of the same year an ascension was made from Cleveland at 11 A. M. At first the balloon moved westward, but, rising higher, it floated out over Lake Erie for eight hours, until Buffalo was nearly reached; then descending to the lower current, it drifted back past Cleveland toward the Canada shore, reaching Point au Pele near 7 P. M. He descended just in time to avoid being carried out over Lake Huron; but, the current changing, he again mounted and the balloon was carried across the lake, up the St. Clair River, finally landing in Michigan near Port Huron, after having traversed a distance of nearly 500 miles. On a trip made in July, 1875, with the “Buffalo,” he carried a photographer with him, who took numerous views of cloud effects, and the journey proved of special interest, as they passed through a series of thunderstorms, which they watched from beginning to end.

In April 1877, he made several short trips from Nashville, Tennessee, with the observers from the U. S. Signal Service. In August 1887, he made an ascent at Fairmount Park, Philadelphia, in his balloon, the “Great Northwest,” accompanied by Henry Hazen of the U. S. Signal Service, and, after four hours drifting in the vicinity of the city, descended opposite Manayunk.

King led the way in the scientific study of the means of air navigation and in the photographing of objects, especially towns and cities, from the air.

== Publicity ==
King's early interest in ballooning created interest in others, so that balloon ascensions became features of expositions, traveling shows and other affairs in which many people were collected together. During the United States centennial year of 1876, King made several excursions of various lengths from Philadelphia, where the Centennial Exposition was located. Over the subsequent years the publicity generated by King and other balloonists during frequent demonstration ascensions led to an increase in the general interest in the navigation of the air.

King made ascents from nearly all the cities of the eastern United States, having in all made over 450 voyages through the air, traversing all the continental United States east of the Mississippi River, and much that is west of that river.

He was married to Margaret Roberts and had two children. He died as the world's oldest balloonist.

== Publications ==
- The Balloon: Noteworthy Aerial Voyages from the Discovery of the Balloon to the Present Time, with a Narrative of the Aeronautic Experiences of Mr. Samuel A. King (1879)
- “How to cross the Atlantic in a Balloon,” Century Magazine, October, 1901.
