= Jessie Belle Rittenhouse =

American journalist (1869–1948)

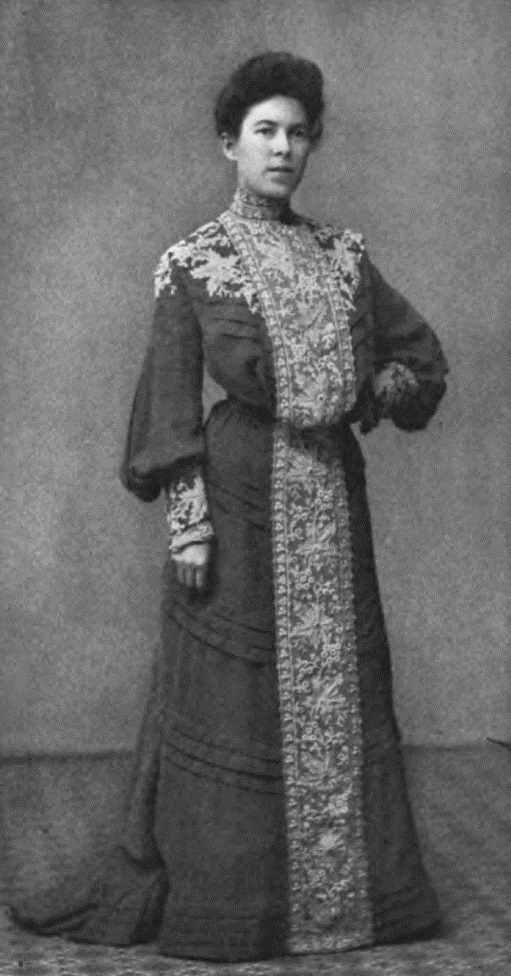
- Born: December 8, 1869; Mount Morris, New York, U.S.
- Died: September 28, 1948 (aged 78); Grosse Pointe Park, Michigan, U.S.
- Education: Genesee Wesleyan Seminary
- Occupations: Lecturer; literary critic; poet
- Years active: 1894–1948
- Known for: Poetry anthologies
- Spouse: Clinton Scollard (m. 1924; died 1932)
- Awards: Robert Frost Medal (1930)

Jessie Belle Rittenhouse Scollard (December 8, 1869 – September 28, 1948), daughter of John Edward and Mary (MacArthur) Rittenhouse, was an American literary critic, compiler of anthologies, and poet. She was a founding member of the Poetry Society of America and its secretary for 10 years.

== Life ==
After graduating in 1890 from Genesee Wesleyan Seminary in Lima, New York, Rittenhouse taught school in Cairo, Illinois, and Grand Haven, Michigan. Her literary career began with book reviews in Buffalo and Rochester, New York, and led to a year as a reporter for the Rochester Democrat and Chronicle in 1894. In 1899, she moved to Boston to begin her literary career in earnest. From 1905 to 1915, Rittenhouse lived in New York City, where she was poetry reviewer for the New York Times Review of Books. From 1914 to 1924 she conducted lecture tours. In 1914, Rittenhouse helped to found the Poetry Society of America, of which she was secretary for 10 years.

On March 20, 1924, Rittenhouse married fellow poet Clinton Scollard in Carmel-by-the-Sea, California.

In the course of her career, Rittenhouse corresponded with numerous contemporary poets, such as John Myers O'Hara, Margaret Widdemer, and Arthur Guiterman. Her poems were set to music by many composers, including Samuel Barber, Noble Cain, Alice Reber Fish, Ethel Glenn Hier, Kirke Mechem, Frederick W. Vanderpool, Wintter Watts, and especially David Wendel Guion.

Late in her career, Rittenhouse moved to Winter Park, Florida, and became associated with Rollins College, where she was a lecturer in poetry.

The Poetry Society of America presented Rittenhouse the first Robert Frost Medal in 1930.

Rittenhouse died at her home in Grosse Pointe Park, Michigan, on September 28, 1948, aged 78.

== Works ==
=== Anthologies ===
- The Lover's Rubáiyát (1904)
- Little Book of Modern Verse (1913)
- Little Book of American Poets (1915)
- Second Book of Modern Verse (1919)
- Little Book of Modern British Verse (1924)
- Third Book of Modern Verse (1927)
- The Singing Heart (1934) (Selected verses by Clinton Scollard)

=== Verse ===
- The Door of Dreams (1918)
- The Lifted Cup (1921)
- The Secret Bird (1930)
- Moving Tide: New and Selected Lyrics (1939)

=== Edited with Clinton Scollard ===
- The Bird-Lovers Anthology (1930)
- Patrician Rhymes (1932)

=== Autobiography ===
- My House of Life (1934)
