= Capitoline Grounds =

Baseball park in Brooklyn, New York, US

- Location within New York City Location within New York
- Location: Brooklyn, New York
- Coordinates: 40°40′58″N 073°56′55″W
- Owner: Reuben S. Decker; Hamilton A. Weed
- Capacity: 5,000
- Surface: Grass

Construction
- Groundbreaking: 1863
- Built: 1864
- Opened: May 5, 1864
- Closed: 1880

Tenants
- Atlantic of Brooklyn (1864–1871); Enterprise of Brooklyn (1866); Brooklyn Atlantics (1872)

The Capitoline Grounds, also known as Capitoline Skating Lake and Base Ball Ground, was a baseball park located in Brooklyn, New York, from 1864 to 1880. It was built to rival nearby Union Grounds, also in Brooklyn. The park hosted local amateur teams in its early history, but later hosted professional and semi-professional games. The park's only season as the home field for an all-professional team occurred in 1872 when the Brooklyn Atlantics joined the National Association of Professional Base Ball Players. The park was flooded during the winter and used as an ice skating park. The grounds were used by local high schools and colleges as well, to play American football games, and ice rink football matches.

Many of organized baseball's earliest historical events took place at the park throughout the 1860s and early 1870s. The most notable event came on June 14, 1870, when the Atlantics defeated the Cincinnati Red Stockings to end their historic 84-game winning streak. Fred Goldsmith successfully demonstrated his curve ball at the grounds in 1870, a pitch previously thought to have been only an optical illusion. In an 1865 game, Ned Cuthbert is credited with inventing the slide when he tried avoiding a tag when attempting to steal a base against the Athletic of Philadelphia. In addition to baseball, the grounds hosted various events and exhibitions; most notably in 1873, when Washington H. Donaldson and two reporters attempted to fly a gas balloon across the Atlantic Ocean. The attempt turned tragic when the balloon crashed in Connecticut killing one of the reporters.

== Origin and construction ==
Reuben S. Decker inherited a portion of his grandfather's farm land and along with Hamilton A. Weed initially opened the Capitoline Skating pond, named in reference to Capitoline Hill, one of the Seven Hills of Rome. The location of the grounds were in the Bedford area of Brooklyn, New York, an area now known as the Bedford-Stuyvesant neighborhood. The grounds encompassed a city block bounded by Halsey Street, Marcy Street, Putnam Avenue, and Nostrand Avenue. The pond area was first conceived as an ice skate park, which began in the winter of 1862–1863. (Marcy also bordered the Union Grounds, less than 2 1/2 miles north of Capitoline Grounds.) It was designed to be a competitor to the nearby Union Grounds, where the first enclosed baseball field opened earlier in 1862. With the success that the Union Grounds experienced by charging admission, Decker and Weed chose to enclose the Capitoline Grounds as well.

The Capitoline Grounds opened for baseball in 1864, consisting of two sets of bleachers that were backed by Nostrand Avenue and Halsey Street, and had an approximate capacity of 5,000 people. In right field stood a circular brick outhouse, and if any player hit a ball over the structure, they were presented with a bottle of Champagne. Along Putnam Avenue, two rows of stables were established for the patrons' horses. Other amenities included a bandstand, clubhouses, and sitting rooms for the female patrons. The Brooklyn Daily Eagle regarded the new park as "the finest, most extensive, and complete ball grounds in the country". The business ran year around; flooding the area during the winter for skating, then draining the park in the spring for baseball matches.

== Baseball ==
=== 1864–1868 ===
The first team to use the grounds as their home field was the Atlantics of Brooklyn, baseball's most successful team since the formation of the National Association of Base Ball Players in 1857. The club had won the most games in 1857, then won the league's first three championships from 1859 to 1861. On May 5, 1864, the first baseball game at Capitoline was a match between the Atlantics and a field of nine players from other Brooklyn teams chosen by sportswriter Henry Chadwick. The Atlantic club defeated the field of nine, 45–11. Later, Atlantic defeated Nassau of Princeton 42–7 in the field's first scheduled club match. The Enterprise of Brooklyn used the grounds as their home field 1864, and the Excelsior of Brooklyn later moved there in 1866. Both the Enterprise and the Excelsior clubs refused to play the Atlantics, but they played a number of matches together, mixing their best nines and their "muffin" nines of club novices. The Atlantics won the NABBP championship in 1864 with an undefeated record.

In early November 1865, the Atlantics played the Athletic of Philadelphia in a two-game, season-ending series. Brooklyn came into the series undefeated, and this was considered a play for the league's championship. The games were played one week apart, the first occurred in Philadelphia, which resulted in a 21–15 victory for Brooklyn. In the second game, played in Brooklyn in front of a crowd of approximately 15,000 spectators, the Atlantics prevailed, this time 27–24. The Atlantics won the championship again in 1866.

=== 1869–1871 ===
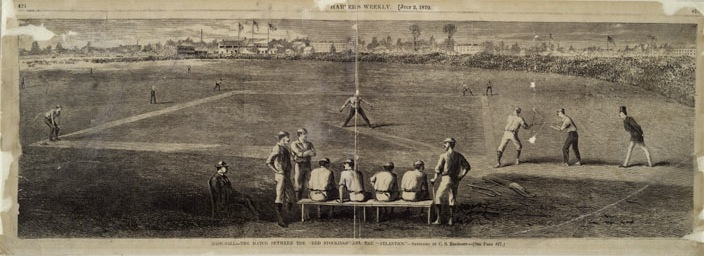
Sketch of Capitoline Grounds during a matchup of the Brooklyn Atlantics and the Cincinnati Red Stockings, 1870

On June 28, 1869, a championship match between the Atlantic club and the New York Mutuals was played on the Capitoline Grounds before a crowd of 10‚000. The Atlantics were ahead in the seventh before the game was stopped due to rain. Later, on September 6, the Eckford Club began a championship series for the pennant with the Atlantic club at the Capitoline Grounds. With 8‚000 spectators on hand, the Atlantics defeated the Eckfords 45–25‚ supported by Joe Start's four home runs.

Due to other local competitors opening area that could hold more ballfields, the Capitoline Grounds split their field into two fields to accommodate more amateur clubs. The first instance of two high-profile teams to begin a season with a practice game happened at the grounds on April 21, 1870. A crowd of 1‚200 paid $.25 apiece to watch the Atlantics and the Union of Morrisania play; the Atlantics won the game 24–10.

The game played at the Capitoline Grounds on June 14, 1870, a match described both as the "greatest game of the year", and "the finest game ever played" took place. With approximately 20,000 people in attendance, Harry Wright and the Cincinnati Red Stockings attempted to extend their 84-game winning streak against the Atlantics in Brooklyn. The Red Stockings had been undefeated in 1869, with a record of 57–0, and had won their first 27 games of the 1870 season. The game was tied 5–5 at the end of the ninth inning, when the Atlantics offered to let the game end since the regulation nine innings had been played, but Wright turned down the proposal, wishing to take the game into extra innings. In the top of the 11th inning‚ the Red Stockings scored two runs, giving themselves a 7–5 lead, but the Atlantics countered with three of their own in the bottom half of the 11th, winning the game.

Henry Chadwick wrote an account that on August 16, 1870, Fred Goldsmith demonstrated a new pitch, the curve ball, at the Capitoline Grounds. Chadwick observed: "That which had up to this point been considered an optical illusion and against all rules of philosophy was now an established fact." By the 1930s, the established baseball community had given the discovery credit to Candy Cummings, and due to Chapman's age, determined that his demonstration has most likely occurred a few years later.

=== 1872–1880 ===
Writeup about Barnum circus in 1880, featuring the acrobat known as Zazel

The only season of Major League Baseball at the Capitoline Grounds was in 1872. The Atlantics, then of the National Association, won the final major league game there 6–3 over Boston, but left for the Union Grounds in 1873. The Capitoline Grounds continued to host lesser matches, as well such events as P. T. Barnum's circus, whose final show at Capitoline came in April 1880.

John B. Day, who owned the New York Metropolitans in 1880, was frustrated about having to play at the ill-kept Capitoline Grounds in Brooklyn, which was not yet a borough of New York City, and the construction of the Brooklyn Bridge had not yet been completed, so the fans of the Mets had to cross the East River by ferry to see their team play. Day's shoe shine boy suggested a site in Manhattan, a place where polo matches were being played. That piece of ground later became the future site of the Polo Grounds.

The Capitoline Grounds was demolished later in 1880. By the late winter of 1880–1881, the property had been cut through by Jefferson Avenue and Hancock Street, and residential lot development had begun.

== Donaldson's failed balloon flight of 1873 ==
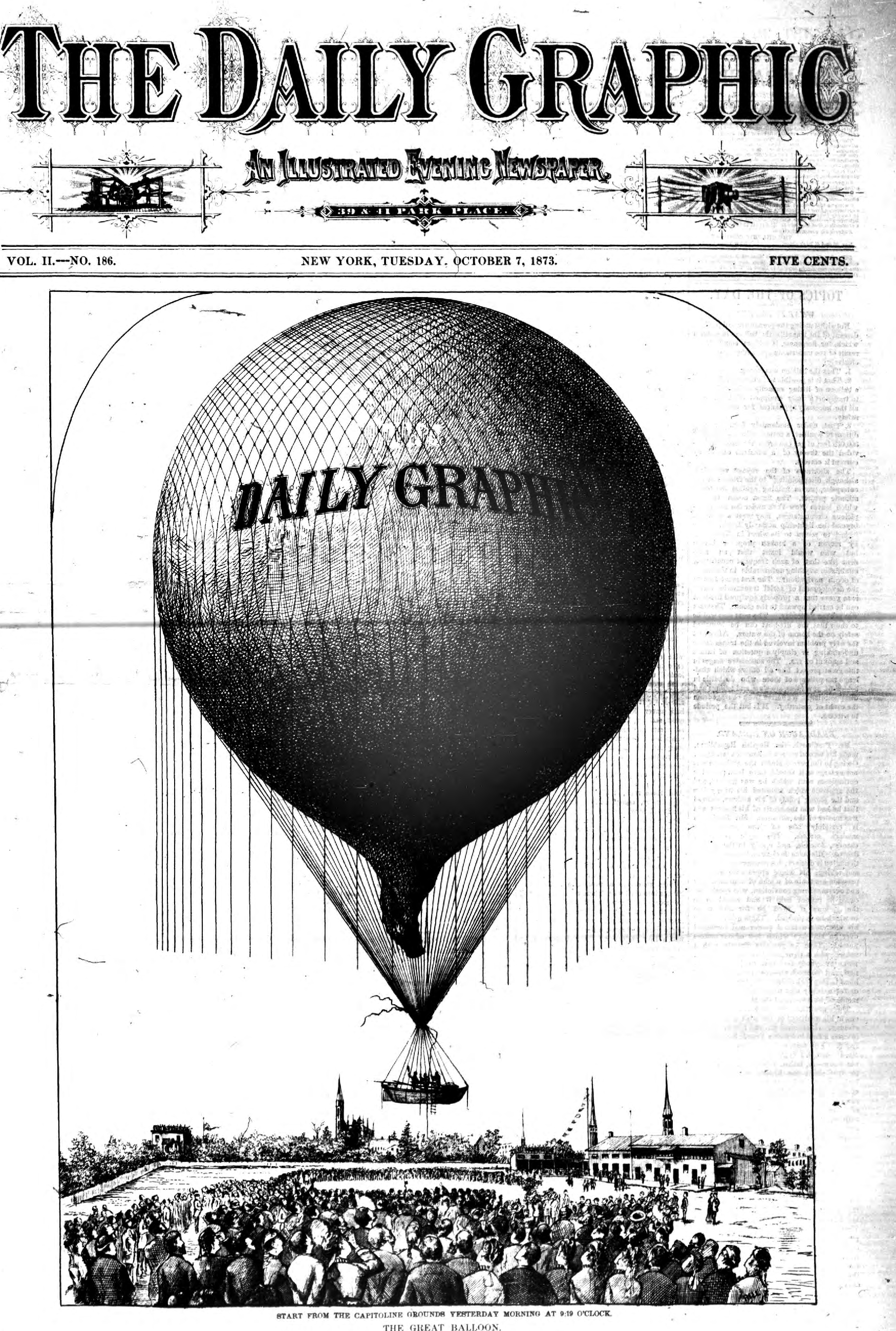
Donaldson's 1873 balloon

In September 1873, Washington Donaldson, a professional balloonist who had formerly worked for P.T. Barnum as a circus performer, along with fellow balloonist John Wise, collaborated on an attempt to cross the Atlantic Ocean in a hot-air balloon. Sponsored by the Daily Graphic, the launch was to take place from the Capitoline Grounds, with Wise planning to use a balloon 49 meters (160 feet) tall with a two-compartment enclosed car, but decided to end his involvement with the project. Donaldson persisted, acquiring a smaller balloon with an open boat for the car.

Donaldson's Atlantic attempt, launched from the Capitoline Grounds accompanied by reporters Alfred Ford and George Lunt, ended up being forced down by a rainstorm, to land on a Connecticut farm. Donaldson and Ford successfully abandoned the runaway balloon, but Lunt stayed with the balloon for a distance until he finally jumped into a tree, sustaining serious injuries from which he died six months later.

Donaldson later disappeared in 1875 when he tried to fly across Lake Michigan in a balloon, accompanied by a reporter named Newton Grimwood. The balloon never made it to the far shore; Grimwood's body washed up on shore weeks later, but Donaldson was never seen again.

== In literature ==
In Darryl Brock's 1990 novel, If I Never Get Back: A Novel, the main character is transported back in time to 1869, where he joins the Cincinnati Red Stockings on their quest to remain undefeated. The Red Stockings travelled to Brooklyn to play the Atlantics at the Capitoline Grounds.

== Bibliography ==
- Batesel, Paul (2012). Players and Teams of the National Association, 1871-1875. McFarland & Company. ISBN 9780786470129.
- Brock, Darryl (1990). If I Never Get Back: A Novel. Crown Publishing Group. ISBN 9780517573457.
- Lowry, Phillip (2009). Green Cathedrals. Bloomsbury Publishing. ISBN 9780802718655.
- McGee, Bob (2005). The Greatest Ballpark Ever. Rutgers University Press. ISBN 0-8135-3600-6.
- McNeil, William F. (2003). The Dodgers Encyclopedia. Sports Publishing LLC. ISBN 9781582616339.
- Mele, Andrew Paul (2008). The Boys of Brooklyn: The Parade Grounds: Brooklyn's Field of Dreams. AuthorHouse. ISBN 9781467094443.
- Morris, Peter (2006). A Game of Inches: The Stories Behind the Innovations That Shaped Baseball Volume 1: the Game on the Field. Rowman & Littlefield. ISBN 9781566636773.
- Nash, Peter J. (2003). Baseball Legends of Brooklyn's Green-Wood Cemetery. Arcadia Publishing. ISBN 9780738534787.
- Smith, Melvin I. (2008). Evolvements of Early American Football. AuthorHouse. ISBN 9781434362469.
