= The Wishing Ring Man =

1919 silent film by David Smith

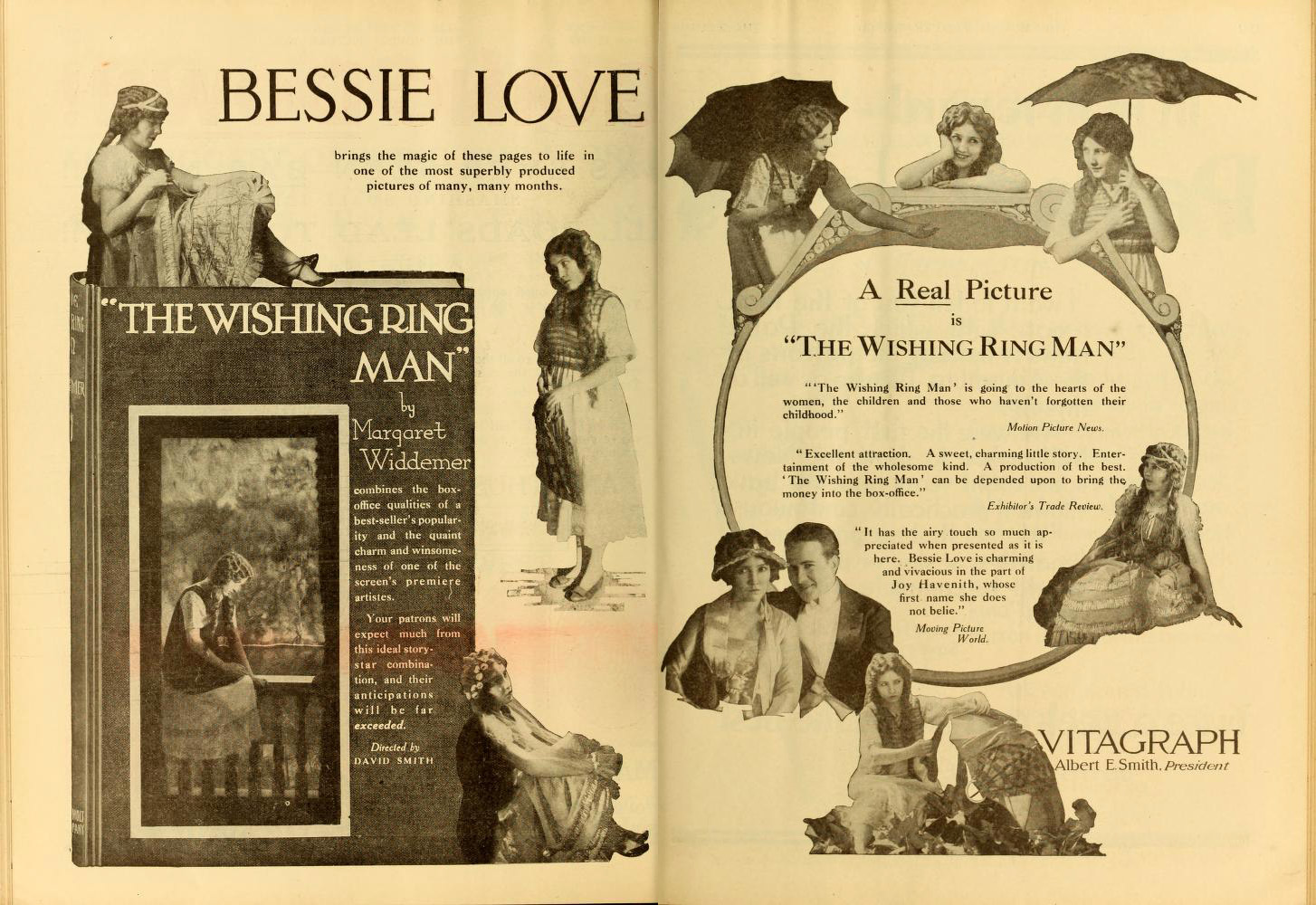
- Magazine advertisement
- Directed by: David Smith
- Based on: The Wishing Ring Man (novel) by Margaret Widdemer
- Starring: Bessie Love; J. Frank Glendon
- Cinematography: Charles R. Seeling
- Production company: Vitagraph Studios
- Release date: March 10, 1919 (U.S.)
- Running time: 50 minutes; 5 reels
- Language: Silent (English intertitles)

The Wishing Ring Man is a 1919 American silent drama film produced by Vitagraph Studios and directed by David Smith. It was based on the novel by Margaret Widdemer, and stars Bessie Love, with J. Frank Glendon in the title role.

The film is presumed lost.

== Plot ==
Joy Havenith (Love) is kept away from other young people so that she can inspire her grandfather's poetry. She is unhappy with her situation and believes the "wishing ring man" (Glendon) when he says that, if she wishes hard enough, she will get everything she wants.

When she is allowed to go to the city, her grandfather refuses to let her go because she is not engaged. Joy claims to be engaged to the doctor, and the doctor is forced to play along.

== Cast ==
- Bessie Love as Joy Havenith
- J. Frank Glendon as Dr. John Hewitt, the wishing ring man
- Jean Hathaway as Mrs. Hewitt
- Claire Du Brey as Gale Maddox
- Truman Van Dyke as Clarence Rutherford
- Willis Marks as Grandfather Havenith
- Alberta Lee as Grandmother Havenith
- Dorothy Hagan as Phyllis Harrington
- Colin Kenny as Allen Harrington

== Release ==
On its release, it was shown with various serials and shorts, including Terror of the Range, the Pathé/Harold Lloyd comedy Billy Blazes, Esq., Mutt and Jeff, or Outing Chester pictures.

== Reception ==
The film received positive reviews, and it was noted that Love wore seventeen different costumes throughout the film.
