= Washington Harrison Donaldson =

American balloonist

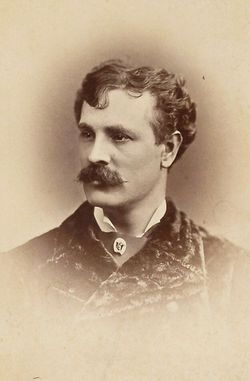
- Born: October 10, 1840; Philadelphia
- Died: July 15, 1875 (aged 34); Lake Michigan
- Years active: 1871 to 1875
- Known for: Balloonist

Washington Harrison Donaldson (10 October 1840 in Philadelphia – 15 July 1875 in Lake Michigan) was a 19th-century balloonist who worked in the United States. He was known as much for his failures as his successes.

== Biography ==
Donaldson spent his early life on stage as a gymnast, ventriloquist, magician, and tight rope performer. In 1862, he walked across the Schuylkill River on a rope 1,200 feet (370 m) long, returned to the middle, and jumped into the river from a height of 90 feet (27 m). He also walked across the Genesee River at Rochester, New York, on a rope 1,800 feet (550 m) long, recrossing it with a man in a wheelbarrow trundled in front of him. From 1857 until 1871, he travelled across the United States and made over 1,300 appearances.

Bartering instruction in magic and the paraphernalia of his exhibitions, Donaldson became the owner of a balloon. With Donaldson having no prior experience in balloon management, his first ascension attempt failed due to his balloon being too small to carry him except with pure hydrogen. As in his previous attempt, the balloon was enlarged and he tried again with coal gas. After Donaldson discarded everything he could, his balloon successfully got off from Reading, Pennsylvania, on 30 August 1871 and made its descent at a distance of 18 miles (29 km). He made another ascent from Reading in September upon a trapeze bar.

On 18 January 1872, he ascended from Norfolk, Virginia, and his balloon unexpectedly burst at an altitude of less than a mile from the ground. He said of it:

“The balloon did not collapse, but closed up at the sides, and, swaying from side to side, descended with frightful velocity. I clung with all my strength to the hoop. I could not tell how badly I was frightened, but felt as though all my hair had been torn out. I scarcely had time to realize that I was alive, when, with a crash, I was projected with the velocity of a catapult into a burr chestnut tree. The netting and rigging, catching in the tree, checked my velocity, but I had my grasp jerked loose, and was precipitated through the limbs and landed flat upon my back, with my tights nearly torn off, and my legs, arms, and body lacerated and bleeding.”

He shortly ascended again from Norfolk. This time, in his haste to avoid being carried out to sea, his balloon was wrecked among the trees, although he himself escaped injury.

He later undertook the construction of a balloon he called the Magenta, which was made of fine jaconet, held about 10,000 cubic feet (280 m^{3}) of gas, and weighed about 100 pounds. He made several ascensions with this balloon, two of which were from Chicago. On the first occasion, he was carried out over Lake Michigan and dragged more than a mile through the water before being brought up against a stone pier with enough force to render him insensible. On 17 May 1873, he ascended from Reading in a 48-pound balloon containing 14,000 cubic feet (400 m^{3}) of gas and made of Manila paper enclosed with a light network. He travelled ten miles (16 km) before landing.

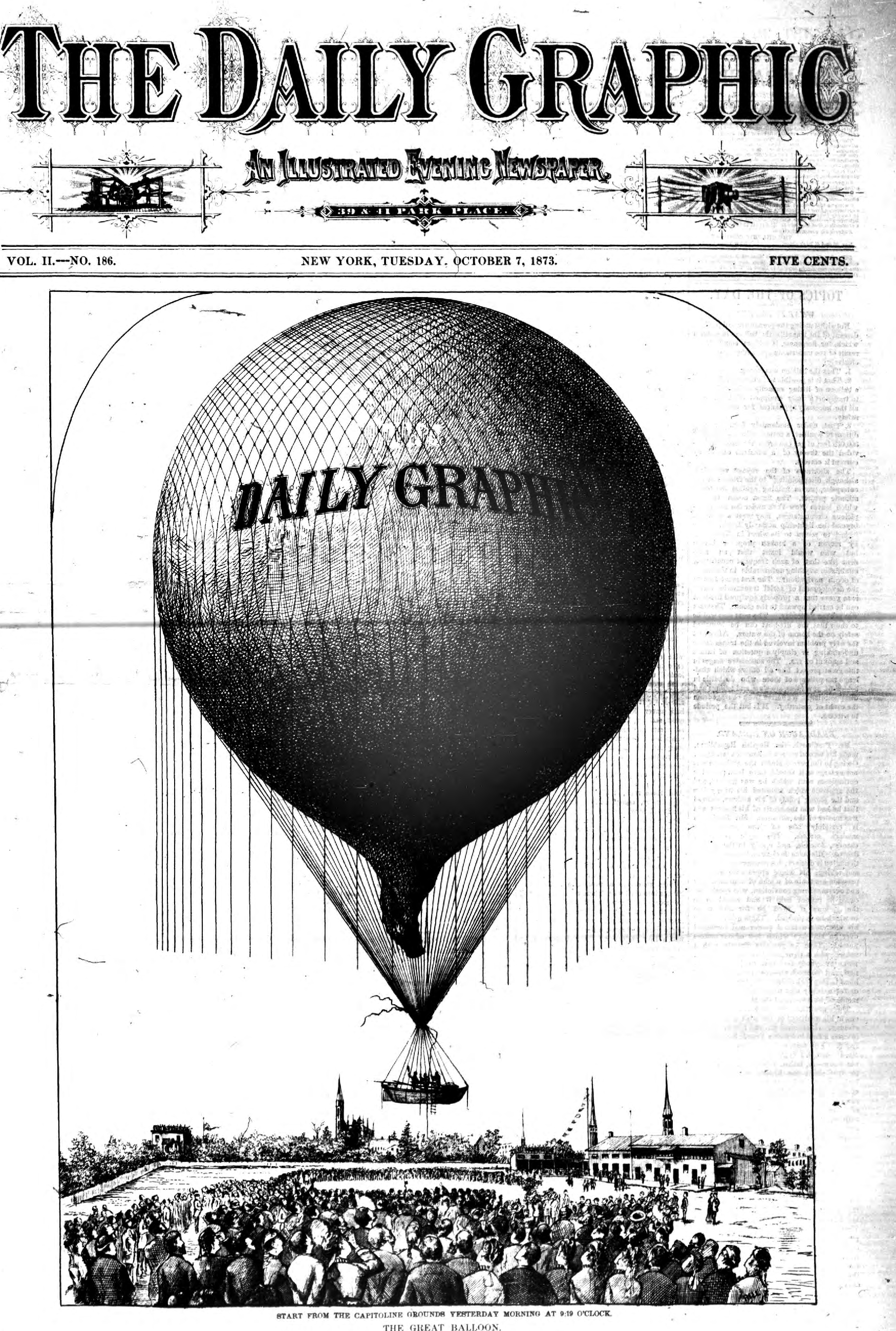
Front page of the Daily Graphic, October 7, 1873, showing Donaldson's team ascending

Convinced of John Wise's theory that there was a constant current blowing from west to east at a height of three miles (4.8 km) via which a balloon could cross the ocean, Donaldson announced his intention of making the attempt. Wise offered to join him, and they set out together to raise the necessary funds. They went to New York City and opened a subscription. Meanwhile, the proprietors of the Daily Graphic offered to furnish the funds required for the construction of a very large cotton twill balloon and outfit together with the gas required. This proposition was accepted.

After the balloon's construction was complete, Donaldson and Wise began to have disputes regarding its reliability. Donaldson's inexperience placed him in a secondary position throughout the entire transaction, but when the time came, Wise withdrew, leaving Donaldson to ascend by himself. The balloon's dimensions were enormous enough to exceed the capabilities of Donaldson's management at that time. Three unsuccessful attempts were made at inflation, with the balloon bursting each time, until Samuel Archer King was sent for and the work was subsequently accomplished.

Donaldson ascended from the Capitoline baseball grounds in Brooklyn, New York, on 7 October 1873 with two companions, Ford and Lunt. A lifeboat filled with provisions and sand was hung beneath the balloon, and served as a car and a means of escape in case the balloon fell into the ocean, although they never reached the sea. They kept inland sufficiently to clear the water until it became apparent that Donaldson was as incapable of managing a balloon in the air as he had been of doing so on the ground. Control was completely lost within a hundred miles of the journey; the balloon dashed into trees and fences and came close to the ground. Donaldson instructed his passengers to jump; Ford jumped with him, but Lunt was too late. A thousand-pound drag rope trailed and prevented the balloon from rising to any considerable height after the two men left the car, and Lunt, panic-stricken at being left behind, threw himself bodily into the first tree the boat came in contact with near Canaan, Connecticut, and fell through to the ground. He died six months later.

P. T. Barnum offered Donaldson an engagement, first at Gilmore's Garden and then with his hippodrome, which was accepted. On 24 July 1874, Donaldson ascended from Gilmore's Garden in a balloon containing 54,000 cubic feet (1,500 m^{3}) of gas, with five passengers that he continued to land one after another as the balloon became weakened. By using the drag rope, he was able to keep afloat for thirteen hours before landing at Greenport, near Hudson, 130 miles (210 km) from New York. Four days afterward he again ascended from Gilmore's Garden. Three hours after starting, two passengers were landed and the voyage continued into the night. A landing was effected at Wallingford, Vermont, at 2 a.m., the journey was resumed at 8 a.m., and the voyage terminated at Thetford, Vermont, by noon.

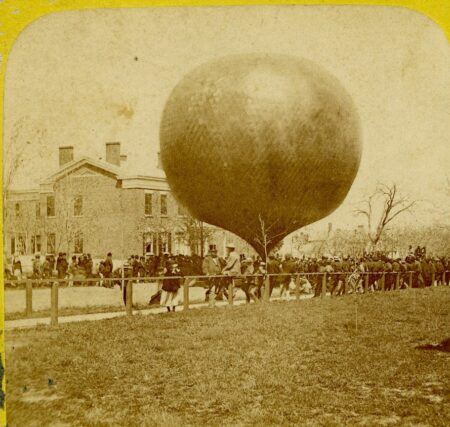
Will O' The Wisp, a balloon owned by Washington Harrison Donaldson. Photograph taken 14 May 1874 in Geneva, New York.

On 19 October of the same year, Donaldson took up a wedding party from Cincinnati, during which the ceremony was to be performed in mid-air. On 23 June 1875, he ascended from Toronto, taking three newspaper reporters with him. They were carried out over and dragged through Lake Ontario for several miles before being rescued by a crew sent out from a passing schooner. Donaldson made numerous ascensions during his tour with the hippodrome. From Pittsburgh, Pennsylvania, he ascended with five women and one man, making a pleasant and safe voyage. On 17 June 1875, he ascended from Buffalo, accompanied by two reporters and his friend Samuel King. They expected to have an experience over Lake Erie, but after a sail of twenty miles (32 km) or more over the water, they reached the Canada shore and eventually landed near Port Colborne.

On 14 July 1875, Donaldson ascended from the lake front in Chicago, carrying several persons with him. Although the balloon drifted lakeward, the stillness of the air made the balloon unable to go more than three miles (4.8 km) from the shore, and it was towed back to its starting place with most of the gas remaining in it and held for the ascension of the following day. When one of the hippodrome managers asked Donaldson why he did not go anywhere, Donaldson said to "wait till to-morrow" and assured the manager that he would "go far enough" that time around.

On the following day, the wind was blowing up the lake at the rate of ten to fifteen miles (24 km) an hour. An additional amount of gas was supplied to make up for what was lost, but the buoyancy was not as great as usual because the materials in the balloon had deteriorated since the previous day. Knowing that he would have a long voyage up the lake, he took only one passenger with him, Newton S. Grimwood of the Chicago Evening Journal, drawing the prize as it was then considered. The voyage began at 5 p.m. The balloon gradually rose to the height of a mile or more, floated off up the lake, and disappeared in about 1 1/2 hours.

At seven o'clock, the crew of the Little Guide, a small craft, saw the balloon trailing the car through the water at about thirty miles (48 km) from shore and tried to reach it, but the balloon shot up into the air again and off into the distance before they could do so. That night, with the cooling gas and natural loss of buoyancy, the balloon descended into the lake again, and a violent storm that came up at about eleven o'clock prevented its passengers from escaping alive. Grimwood's body was washed ashore on the farther side of the lake and was found on 16 August. Neither Donaldson nor any part of the balloon were ever found.

== In popular culture ==
In The Annotated Wizard of Oz, Michael Patrick Hearn suggests that Donaldson may have been an inspiration for L. Frank Baum in creating the title character of The Wonderful Wizard of Oz. Like Donaldson, the Wizard of Oz was a balloonist, ventriloquist and stage magician who worked for a circus, but disappeared, balloon and all, during an ascent, and was never found.

The phrase "goodbye cruel world" first appeared in a newspaper article published on 5 August 1875, in the St. Louis Globe-Democrat that discussed Donaldson's disappearance.
