= The Call of the Wild =

1903 novel by Jack London

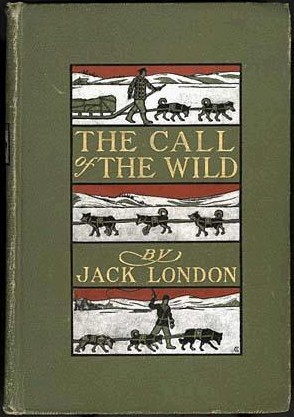
- First edition cover
- Author: Jack London
- Illustrator: Philip R. Goodwin and Charles Livingston Bull
- Cover artist: Charles Edward Hooper
- Language: English
- Genre: Adventure fiction
- Set in: Santa Clara Valley and Yukon, c. 1896–99
- Publisher: Macmillan
- Publication date: 1903
- Publication place: United States
- Media type: Print (Serial, Hardcover & Paperback)
- Pages: 232 (First edition)
- OCLC: 28228581
- Dewey Decimal: 813.4
- LC Class: PS3523 .O46
- Text: The Call of the Wild at Wikisource

The Call of the Wild is an adventure novel by Jack London, published in 1903 and set in Yukon, Canada, during the 1890s Klondike Gold Rush, when strong sled dogs were in high demand. The central character of the novel is a dog named Buck. The story opens at a ranch in Santa Clara Valley, California, when Buck is stolen from his home and sold into service as a sled dog in Alaska. He becomes progressively more primitive and wild in the harsh environment, where he is forced to fight to survive and dominate other dogs. By the end, he sheds the veneer of civilization, and relies on primal instinct and learned experience to emerge as a leader in the wild.

London spent about a year in Yukon, and his observations form much of the material for the book. The story was serialized in The Saturday Evening Post in the summer of 1903 and was published later that year in book form. The book's great popularity and success made a reputation for London. As early as 1923, the story was adapted to film, and it has since seen several more cinematic adaptations.

One of the most notable adaptations was the 1935 film, starring Clark Gable and Loretta Young, as well as Frank Conroy and Jack Oakie. Considerable liberties were taken with the story line.

== Summary ==
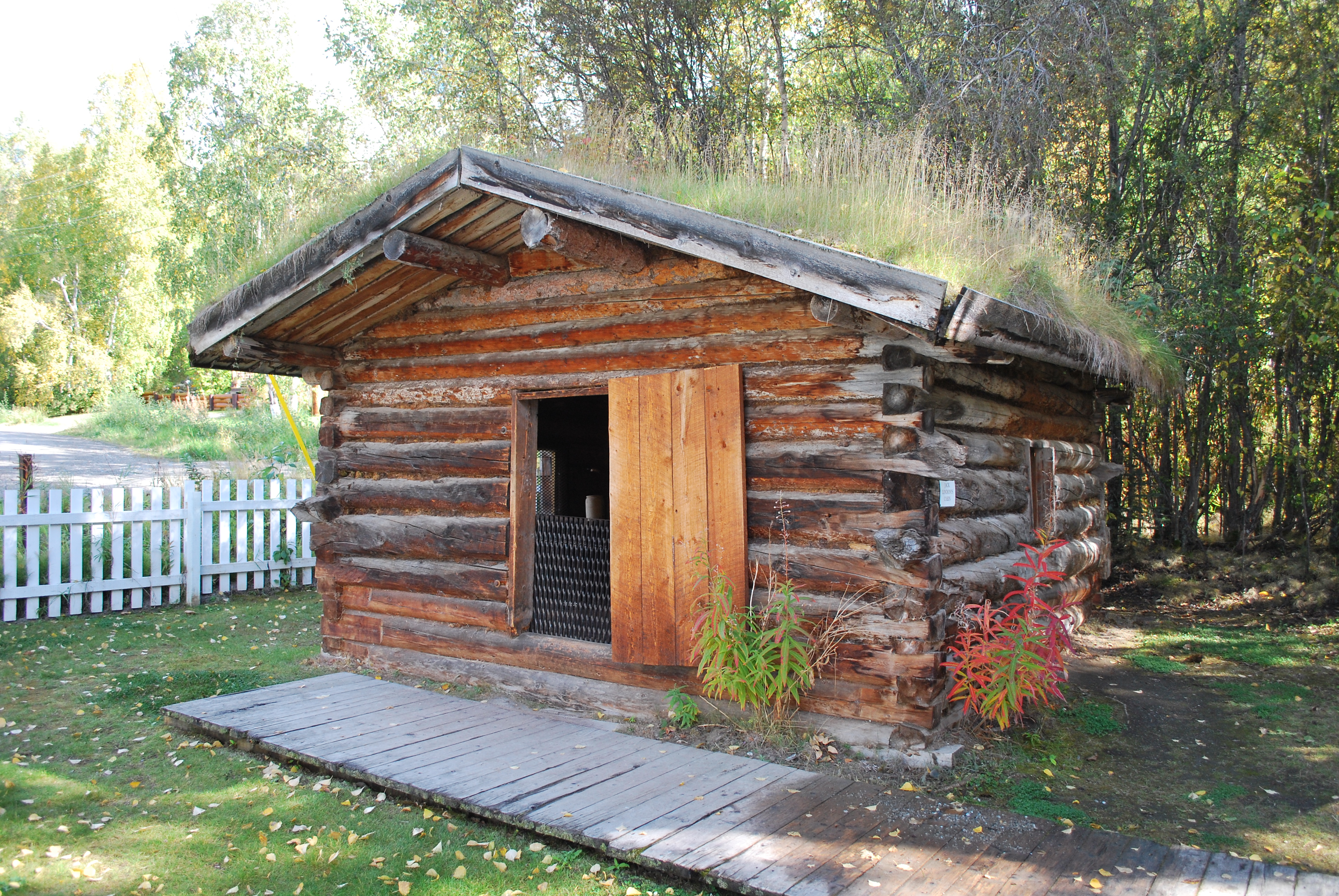
Jack London’s Yukon Cabin at 63.4260553°N 139.3422548°W.

The story opens in 1897 with Buck, a powerful 140-pound St. Bernard–Scotch Shepherd mix, happily living in California's Santa Clara Valley as the pampered pet of Judge Miller and his family. A gardener named Manuel, needing money to pay his gambling debts, kidnaps Buck and sells him. Buck is shipped to Seattle, where he is confined in a crate, starved, and ill-treated. When released, Buck attacks his handler, the "man in the red sweater" who teaches Buck the "law of club and fang" with a severe beating, sufficiently cowing him. The man shows some kindness after Buck demonstrates obedience.

Shortly after, Buck is sold to two French-Canadian mail dispatchers from the Canadian government, François and Perrault, who take him to Alaska. Buck is trained as a sled dog and joins a team in the Klondike region. In addition to Buck, François and Perrault have ten dogs on their team, many but not all of whom are named and have distinct personalities. Buck's teammates teach him how to survive cold winter nights and about pack society. Over the next several weeks on the trail, a bitter rivalry develops between Buck and the lead dog, Spitz, a vicious and quarrelsome white husky. Buck eventually kills Spitz in a fight and becomes the new lead dog.

When François and Perrault complete the round-trip of the Yukon Trail in record time, returning to Skagway with their dispatches, they learn that the government is ending its sled dispatch service. They sell their sled team to a "Scotch half-breed" man who delivers mining supplies. The dogs, accustomed to light work, are now forced to make long, tiring trips, carrying heavy loads to the mining areas. While running the trail, Buck seems to have memories of a canine ancestor who has a short-legged hairy man as a companion. The team is quickly worn down by hard labor, and the wheel dog, Dave, a morose husky, becomes terminally sick and is eventually shot.

With the dogs too exhausted and footsore to be of use, they are sold off to three stampeders from the American Southland (the present-day contiguous United States) — a vain woman named Mercedes, her sheepish husband Charles, and her arrogant brother Hal. Hoping to find gold quickly to restore their family's bankrupt estate, the stampeders ignore others' helpful advice and start their journey ill-prepared for the harsh winter. Hal foolishly creates a team of 14 dogs, believing they will travel faster, and because Mercedes insists on keeping her heavy but useless fashion items. The dogs are overfed and overworked, then starved when food runs low. Most of the dogs die on the trail, leaving only Buck and four others still alive when they pull into the White River.

The group meets John Thornton, an experienced outdoorsman, who notices the dogs' poor condition. The trio ignores Thornton's warnings about crossing the ice and press onward. Exhausted, starving, and sensing the danger ahead, Buck refuses to continue. After Hal whips Buck mercilessly, Thornton hits him and cuts Buck free. The stampeders then try to cross the river, but it breaks under their weight, and they and the surviving dogs quickly succumb to hypothermia in the cold water.

As Thornton nurses Buck back to health, Buck grows to love him. Buck fends off a malicious man named Burton who hit Thornton while the latter was defending an innocent "tenderfoot." This gives Buck a reputation all over the North. Buck also saves Thornton when he falls into a river. After Thornton takes him on trips to pan for gold, a man called Matthewson wagers Thornton on Buck's strength and devotion. Buck pulls a sled with a half-ton (1,000 lb; 450 kg) load of flour, breaking it free from the frozen ground, dragging it 100 yards (91 m), and winning Thornton US$1,600 (equivalent to $62,000 in 2025).

Using his winnings, Thornton pays his debts and continues searching for gold with partners Pete and Hans, sledding Buck and six other dogs to search for a fabled Lost Cabin. Once they locate a suitable gold find, the dogs find they have nothing to do. Buck has more ancestor memories of being with the primitive "hairy man." While Thornton and his two friends pan gold, Buck hears the call of the wild, explores the wilderness, and socializes with a wolf from a local pack. However, Buck does not join the wolves and returns to Thornton. Buck repeatedly goes back and forth between Thornton and the wild, unsure of where he belongs.

Returning to the campsite one day after a four day long moose hunt, he finds Hans, Pete, and Thornton along with their dogs have been murdered by Native American Yeehats. Enraged, Buck kills several Natives to avenge Thornton, then realizes he no longer has any human ties left. He goes looking for his wild brother and encounters a hostile wolf pack. He fights them and wins, then discovers that the lone wolf he had socialized with is a pack member. Buck follows the pack into the forest and answers the call of the wild.

The legend of Buck spreads among other Native Americans as the "Ghost Dog" of the Northland (Alaska and northwestern Canada). Each year, on the anniversary of his attack on the Yeehats, Buck returns to the former campsite where he was last with Thornton to mourn his death. Every winter, leading the wolf pack, Buck wreaks vengeance on the Yeehats "as he sings a song of the younger world, which is the song of the pack."

== Background ==
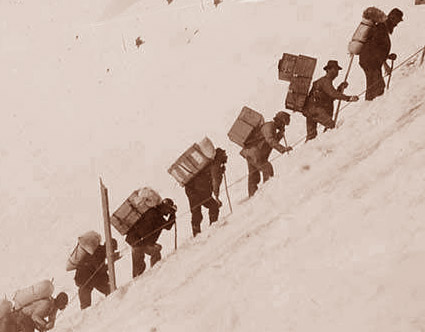
Miners carry gear up the Chilkoot Pass to reach the Klondike

California native Jack London had traveled around the United States as a hobo, returned to California to finish high school (he dropped out at age 14), and spent a year in college at Berkeley, when in 1897 he went to the Klondike by way of Alaska during the height of the Klondike Gold Rush. Later, he said of the experience: "It was in the Klondike I found myself."

He left California in July and traveled by boat to Dyea, Alaska, where he landed and went inland. To reach the goldfields, he and his party transported their gear over the Chilkoot Pass, often carrying loads as heavy as 100 pounds (45 kg) on their backs. They were successful in staking claims to eight gold mines along the Stewart River.

London stayed in the Klondike for almost a year, living temporarily in the frontier town of Dawson City, before moving to a nearby winter camp, where he spent the winter in a temporary shelter reading books he had brought: Charles Darwin's On the Origin of Species and John Milton's Paradise Lost. In the winter of 1898, Dawson City was a city comprising about 30,000 miners, a saloon, an opera house, and a street of brothels.

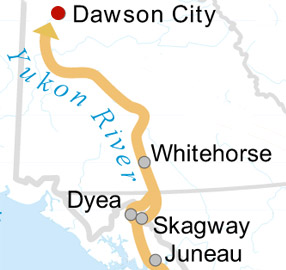
Klondike routes map. The section connecting Dyea/Skagway with Dawson is referred to by London as the "Yukon Trail".

In the spring, as the annual gold stampeders began to stream in, London left. He had contracted scurvy, common in the Arctic winters where fresh produce was unavailable. When his gums began to swell he decided to return to California. With his companions, he rafted 2,000 miles (3,200 km) down the Yukon River, through portions of the wildest territory in the region, until they reached St. Michael. There, he hired himself out on a boat to earn return passage to San Francisco.

In Alaska, London found the material that inspired him to write The Call of the Wild. Dyea Beach was the primary point of arrival for miners when London traveled through there, but because its access was treacherous Skagway soon became the new arrival point for prospectors. To reach the Klondike, miners had to navigate White Pass, known as "Dead Horse Pass", where horse carcasses littered the route because they could not survive the harsh and steep ascent. Horses were replaced with dogs as pack animals to transport material over the pass; particularly strong dogs with thick fur were "much desired, scarce and high in price".

London would have seen many dogs, especially prized husky sled dogs, in Dawson City and the winter camps situated close to the main sled route. He was friends with Marshall Latham Bond and his brother Louis Whitford Bond, the owners of a mixed St. Bernard-Scotch Collie dog about which London later wrote: "Yes, Buck is based on your dog at Dawson." Beinecke Library at Yale University holds a photograph of Bond's dog, taken during London's stay in the Klondike in 1897. The depiction of the California ranch at the beginning of the story was based on the Bond family ranch.

== Publication history ==
On his return to California, London was unable to find work and relied on odd jobs such as cutting grass. He submitted a query letter to the San Francisco Bulletin proposing a story about his Alaskan adventure, but the idea was rejected because, as the editor told him, "Interest in Alaska has subsided to an amazing degree." A few years later, London wrote a short story about a dog named Bâtard who, at the end of the story, kills his master. London sold the piece to Cosmopolitan Magazine, which published it in the June 1902 issue under the title "Diablo – A Dog". London's biographer, Earle Labor, says that London then began work on The Call of the Wild to "redeem the species" from his dark characterization of dogs in "Bâtard". Expecting to write a short story, London explains: "I meant it to be a companion to my other dog story 'Bâtard' ... but it got away from me, and instead of 4,000 words it ran 32,000 before I could call a halt."

Written as a frontier story about the gold rush, The Call of the Wild was meant for the pulp market. It was first published in five installments in The Saturday Evening Post, which bought it for $750 in 1903 (~$26,875 in 2025). In the same year, London sold all rights to the story to Macmillan, which published it in book format. The book has never been out of print since that time.

=== Editions ===
- The first edition, by Macmillan, released in July 1903, had 10 tipped-in color plates by illustrators Philip R. Goodwin and Charles Livingston Bull, and a color frontispiece by Charles Edward Hooper; it sold for $1.50. It is presently available with the original illustrations at the Internet Archive.

== Genre ==
Buck proves himself as leader of the pack when he fights Spitz "to the death".

The Call of the Wild falls into the categories of adventure fiction and what is sometimes referred to as the animal story genre, in which an author attempts to write an animal protagonist without resorting to anthropomorphism. At the time, London was criticized for attributing "unnatural" human thoughts and insights to a dog, so much so that he was accused of being a nature faker. London himself dismissed these criticisms as "homocentric" and "amateur". London further responded that he had set out to portray nature more accurately than his predecessors.

"I have been guilty of writing two animal stories—two books about dogs. The writing of these two stories, on my part, was in truth a protest against the 'humanizing' of animals, of which it seemed to me several 'animal writers' had been profoundly guilty. Time and again, and many times, in my narratives, I wrote, speaking of my dog heroes: 'He did not think these things; he merely did them,' etc. And I did this repeatedly, to the clogging of my narrative and in violation of my artistic canons; and I did it to hammer into the average human understanding that these dog-heroes of mine were not directed by abstract reasoning, but by instinct, sensation, and emotion, and by simple reasoning. Also, I endeavored to make my stories in line with the facts of evolution; I hewed them to the mark set by scientific research, and awoke, one day, to find myself bundled neck and crop into the camp of the nature-fakers."

Along with his contemporaries Frank Norris and Theodore Dreiser, London was influenced by the naturalism of European writers such as Émile Zola, in which themes such as heredity versus environment were explored. London's use of the genre gave it a new vibrancy, according to scholar Richard Lehan.

The story is also an example of American pastoralism—a prevailing theme in American literature—in which the mythic hero returns to nature. As with other characters of American literature, such as Rip van Winkle and Huckleberry Finn, Buck symbolizes a reaction against industrialization and social convention with a return to nature. London presents the motif simply, clearly, and powerfully in the story, a motif later echoed by 20th-century American writers William Faulkner and Ernest Hemingway (most notably in "Big Two-Hearted River"). E.L. Doctorow says of the story that it is "fervently American".

The enduring appeal of the story, according to American literature scholar Donald Pizer, is that it is a combination of allegory, parable, and fable. The story incorporates elements of age-old animal fables, such as Aesop's Fables, in which animals speak the truth, and traditional beast fables, in which the beast "substitutes wit for insight". London was influenced by Rudyard Kipling's The Jungle Book, written a few years earlier, with its combination of parable and animal fable, and by other animal stories popular in the early 20th century. In The Call of the Wild, London intensifies and adds layers of meaning that are lacking in these stories.

As a writer, London tended to skimp on form, according to biographer Labor, and neither The Call of the Wild nor White Fang "is a conventional novel". The story follows the archetypal "myth of the hero"; Buck, who is the hero, takes a journey, is transformed, and achieves an apotheosis. The format of the story is divided into four distinct parts, according to Labor. In the first part, Buck experiences violence and struggles for survival; in the second part, he proves himself a leader of the pack; the third part brings him to his death (symbolically and almost literally); and in the fourth and final part, he undergoes rebirth.

== Themes ==
London's story is a tale of survival and a return to primitivism. Pizer writes that: "the strong, the shrewd, and the cunning shall prevail when ...life is bestial".

Pizer also finds evidence in the story of a Christian theme of love and redemption, as shown by Buck's refusal to revert to violence until after the death of Thornton, who had won Buck's love and loyalty. London, who went so far as to fight for custody of one of his own dogs, understood that loyalty between dogs (particularly working dogs) and their masters is built on trust and love.

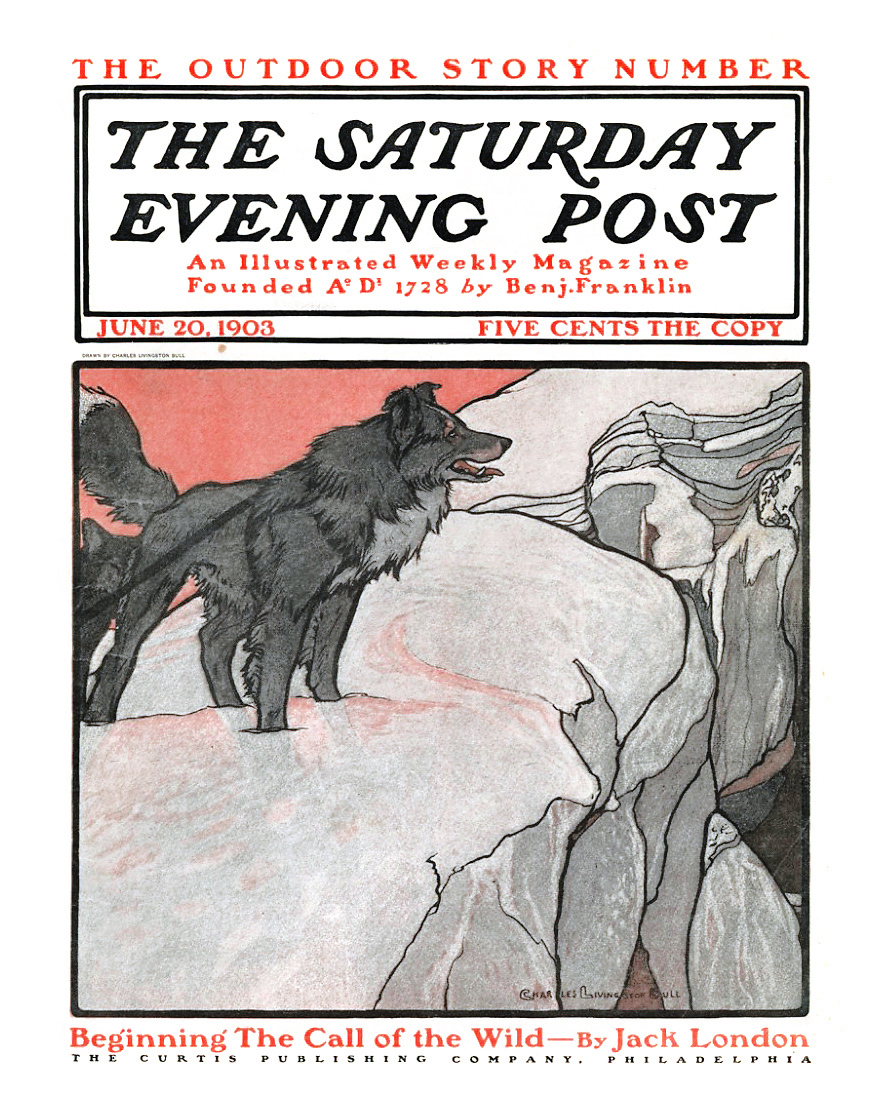
The Call of the Wild (cover of the June 20, 1903 Saturday Evening Post shown) is about the survival of the fittest.

Writing in the "Introduction" to the Modern Library edition of The Call of the Wild, E. L. Doctorow says the theme is based on Darwin's concept of the survival of the fittest. London places Buck in conflict with humans, in conflict with the other dogs, and in conflict with his environment—all of which he must challenge, survive, and conquer. Buck, a domesticated dog, must call on his atavistic hereditary traits to survive; he must learn to be wild to become wild, according to Tina Gianquitto. He learns that in a world where "the club and the fang" are law, where the law of the pack rules and a good-natured dog such as Curly can be torn to pieces by pack members, survival by whatever means is paramount.

London also explores the idea of "nature vs. nurture". Buck, raised as a pet, is by heredity a wolf. The change of environment brings up his innate characteristics and strengths to the point where he fights for survival and becomes the leader of the pack. Pizer describes how the story reflects human nature in its prevailing theme of strength, particularly in the face of harsh circumstances.

The veneer of civilization is thin and fragile, writes Doctorow, and London exposes the brutality at the core of humanity and the ease with which humans revert to a state of primitivism. His interest in Marxism is evident in the sub-theme that humanity is motivated by materialism, and his interest in Nietzschean philosophy is shown by Buck's characterization. Gianquitto writes that in Buck's characterization, London created a type of Nietzschean Übermensch – in this case a dog that reaches mythic proportions.

Doctorow sees the story as a caricature of a bildungsroman – in which a character learns and grows – in that Buck becomes progressively less civilized. Gianquitto explains that Buck has evolved to the point that he is ready to join a wolf pack, which has a social structure uniquely adapted to and successful in the harsh Arctic environment, unlike humans, who are weak in the harsh environment.

== Writing style ==
Old longings nomadic leap,
Chafing at custom's chain;
Again from its brumal sleep
Wakens the ferine strain.

— John Myers O'Hara, Atavism

The first chapter opens with the first quatrain of John Myers O'Hara's poem, Atavism, published in 1902 in The Bookman. The stanza outlines one of the main motifs of The Call of the Wild: that Buck when removed from the "sun-kissed" Santa Clara Valley where he was raised, will revert to his wolf heritage with its innate instincts and characteristics.

The themes are conveyed through London's use of symbolism and imagery which, according to Labor, vary in the different phases of the story. The imagery and symbolism in the first phase, to do with the journey and self-discovery, depict physical violence, with strong images of pain and blood. In the second phase, fatigue becomes a dominant image and death is a dominant symbol, as Buck comes close to being killed. The third phase is a period of renewal and rebirth and takes place in the spring, before ending with the fourth phase, when Buck fully reverts to nature and is placed in a vast and "weird atmosphere", a place of pure emptiness.

The setting is allegorical. The southern lands represent the soft, materialistic world; the northern lands symbolize a world beyond civilization and are inherently competitive. The harshness, brutality, and emptiness in Alaska reduce life to its essence, as London learned, and it shows in Buck's story. Buck must defeat Spitz, the dog who symbolically tries to get ahead and take control. When Buck is sold to Charles, Hal, and Mercedes, he finds himself in a dirty camp. They treat their dogs badly; they are artificial interlopers in the pristine landscape. Conversely, Buck's next masters, John Thornton and his two companions are described as "living close to the earth". They keep a clean camp, treat their animals well, and represent man's nobility in nature. Unlike Buck, Thornton loses his fight with his fellow species, and not until Thornton's death does Buck revert fully to the wild and his primordial state.

The characters too are symbolic of types. Charles, Hal, and Mercedes symbolize vanity and ignorance, while Thornton and his companions represent loyalty, purity, and love. Much of the imagery is stark and simple, with an emphasis on images of cold, snow, ice, darkness, meat, and blood.

London varied his prose style to reflect the action. He wrote in an over-affected style in his descriptions of Charles, Hal, and Mercedes' camp as a reflection of their intrusion into the wilderness. Conversely, when describing Buck and his actions, London wrote in a style that was pared down and simple—a style that would influence and be the forebear of Hemingway's style.

The story was written as a frontier adventure and in such a way that it worked well as a serial. As Doctorow points out, it is good episodic writing that embodies the style of magazine adventure writing popular in that period. "It leaves us with satisfaction at its outcome, a story well and truly told," he said.

== Reception and legacy ==
Cover of Classics Illustrated The Call of the Wild, published in 1952

The Call of the Wild was enormously popular from the moment it was published. H. L. Mencken wrote of London's story: "No other popular writer of his time did any better writing than you will find in The Call of the Wild." A reviewer for The New York Times wrote of it in 1903: "If nothing else makes Mr. London's book popular, it ought to be rendered so by the complete way in which it will satisfy the love of dog fights apparently inherent in every man." The reviewer for The Atlantic Monthly wrote that it was a book: "untouched by bookishness...The making and the achievement of such a hero [Buck] constitute, not a pretty story at all, but a very powerful one."

The book secured London a place in the canon of American literature. The first printing of 10,000 copies sold out immediately; it is still one of the best-known stories written by an American author and continues to be read and taught in schools. It has been published in 47 languages. London's first success, the book secured his prospects as a writer and gained him a readership that stayed with him throughout his career.

After the success of The Call of the Wild, London wrote to Macmillan in 1904 proposing a second book (White Fang) in which he wanted to describe the opposite of Buck: a dog that transforms from wild to tame: "I'm going to reverse the process...Instead of devolution of decivilization ... I'm going to give the evolution, the civilization of a dog."

== Adaptations ==
- The 1923 adaptation a silent film written and directed by Fred Jackman and produced by Hal Roach.
- The 1935 version, starring Clark Gable and Loretta Young, expanded John Thornton's role and was the first "talkie" to feature the story.
- The 1972 movie The Call of the Wild, starring Charlton Heston as John Thornton, was filmed in Finland.
- The 1976 television film The Call of the Wild, starring John Beck.
- The 1980 unabridged audiobook adaptation by Recorded Books LLC (#80110) (3 audio-cassettes, 4.5 hours playing time), narrated by Frank Muller.
- The 1981 anime film Call of the Wild: Howl Buck, starring Mike Reynolds and Bryan Cranston.
- The 1983–1984 comic book adaptation by Hungarian comics artist Imre Sebök, which was also translated into German.
- The 1993 movie starring Rick Schroeder.
- The 1997 adaptation called The Call of the Wild: Dog of the Yukon, starring Rutger Hauer and narrated by Richard Dreyfuss.
- The 1998 comic adaptation for Boys' Life magazine. Out of cultural sensitivities, the Yeehat Native Americans are omitted, and John Thornton's killers are now white criminals who, as before, are also killed by Buck.
- The 2000 television adaptation released on Animal Planet. It ran for a single season of 13 episodes and was released on DVD in 2010 as a feature film.
- The 2020 film The Call of the Wild, a film starring Harrison Ford. Terry Notary provided the motion-capture performance for Buck the dog.

== Bibliography ==
- Benoit, Raymond (Summer 1968). "Jack London's 'The Call of the Wild'". American Quarterly. 20 (2). The Johns Hopkins University Press: 246–248. doi:10.2307/2711035. JSTOR 2711035. S2CID 147169008.
- Courbier-Tavenier, Jacqueline (1999). "The Call of the Wild and The Jungle: Jack London and Upton Sinclair's Animal and Human Jungles". In Pizer, Donald (ed.). Cambridge Companion to American Realism and Naturalism: Howells to London. New York: Cambridge University Press. ISBN 978-0-521-43876-6.
- Doctorow, E. L.; London, Jack (1998). "Introduction". The Call of the Wild, White Fang & To Build a Fire. The Modern Library hundred best novels of the twentieth century. Vol. 88 (reprint ed.). Modern Library. ISBN 978-0-375-75251-3. OCLC 38884558.
- Doon, Ellen. "Marshall Bond Papers" (Document). New Haven, Conn, USA: Yale University. hdl:10079/fa/beinecke.bond.
- Dyer, Daniel (April 1988). "Answering the Call of the Wild". The English Journal. 77 (4). National Council of Teachers of English: 57–62. doi:10.2307/819308. JSTOR 819308.
- Barnes & Noble (2003). "'Jack London' – Biographical Note". The Call of the Wild and White Fang. Barnes and Noble Classics. Introduction by Tina Giantquitto (reprint ed.). Barnes & Noble. ISBN 978-1-59308-002-0.
- Barnes & Noble (2003). "'The World of Jack London'". The Call of the Wild and White Fang. Barnes and Noble Classics. Introduction by Tina Giantquitto (reprint ed.). Barnes & Noble. ISBN 978-1-59308-002-0.
- Giantquitto, Tina (2003). "'Introduction'". The Call of the Wild and White Fang. Barnes and Noble Classics. Introduction by Tina Giantquitto (reprint ed.). Barnes & Noble. ISBN 978-1-59308-002-0.
- Giantquitto, Tina (2003). "'Endnotes'". The Call of the Wild and White Fang. Barnes and Noble Classics. Introduction by Tina Giantquitto (reprint ed.). Barnes & Noble. ISBN 978-1-59308-002-0.
- Barnes & Noble (2003). "Inspired by 'The Call of the Wild' and 'White Fang'". The Call of the Wild and White Fang. Barnes and Noble Classics. Introduction by Tina Giantquitto (reprint ed.). Barnes & Noble. ISBN 978-1-59308-002-0.
- Barnes & Noble (2003). "'Comments and Questions'". The Call of the Wild and White Fang. Barnes and Noble Classics. Introduction by Tina Giantquitto (reprint ed.). Barnes & Noble. ISBN 978-1-59308-002-0.
- Lehan, Richard (1999). "The European Background". In Pizer, Donald (ed.). Cambridge Companion to American Realism and Naturalism: Howells to London. New York: Cambridge University Press. ISBN 978-0-521-43876-6.
- "Jack London's 'The Call of the Wild'". Publishers Weekly. 64 (1). F. Leypoldt. 1 August 1903.
- Labor, Earle; Reesman, Jeanne Campbell (1994). Jack London. Twayne's United States authors series. Vol. 230 (revised, illustrated ed.). New York: Twayne Publishers. ISBN 978-0-8057-4033-2. OCLC 485895575.
- London, Jack (1903). The Call of the Wild . Wikisource.
- London, Jack (1960). The Call of the Wild (reprint ed.). A Whitman Book/Western Publishing Company, Inc., Racine, Wisconsin.
- London, Jack (1998). The Call of the Wild, White Fang & To Build a Fire. The Modern Library hundred best novels of the twentieth century. Vol. 88. Introduction by E. L. Doctorow (reprint ed.). Modern Library. ISBN 978-0-375-75251-3. OCLC 38884558.
- Modern Library (1998). "'Jack London' – Biographical Note". The Call of the Wild, White Fang & To Build a Fire. The Modern Library hundred best novels of the twentieth century. Vol. 88. Introduction by E. L. Doctorow (reprint ed.). Modern Library. ISBN 978-0-375-75251-3. OCLC 38884558.
- Pizer, Donald (1983). "Jack London: The Problem of Form". Studies in the Literary Imagination. 16 (2): 107–115.
- Smith, Geoffrey D. (13 August 1997). American Fiction, 1901–1925: A Bibliography. Cambridge University Press. p. 409. ISBN 978-0-521-43469-0.
- "London, Jack 1876–1916". The call of the wild. WorldCat.
