= Dagmar de Corval Rybner =

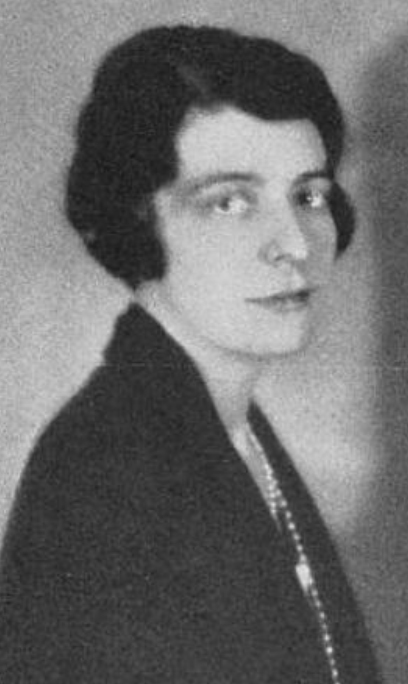
- Born: 9 September 1890; Baden
- Died: 22 July 1965 (aged 74)
- Other names: Dagmar Rybner Barclay
- Occupations: Pianist, composer

Dagmar de Corval Rybner Barclay (9 September 1890 – 22 July 1965) was a Swiss-German composer, pianist, and teacher who worked and corresponded with Sergei Rachmaninoff. She published and performed under the name Dagmar Rybner.

== Biography ==
Rybner was born in Baden to Claudine Pezet de Corval and Dr. Cornelius Rybner, a Danish composer and pianist who eventually chaired the music department at Columbia University. Cornelius changed the family name from “Rubner” to “Rybner.” Dagmar married the singer John Barclay. They had one daughter and later divorced.

Rybner studied music in Karlsruhe, Germany; Neuchatel, Switzerland; and New York. She made her European debut as a pianist playing the Schumann piano concerto under conductor Felix Mottl. After moving to New York, she played a Tchaikovsky piano concerto under conductor Adolf Rothmeyer. Rybner toured as a pianist throughout the United States, appearing at the White House and with the Metropolitan Opera House Orchestra, as well as with orchestras in Boston, Philadelphia, Pittsburgh, Washington, D.C., and Russia. She also presented duo piano recitals with her father.

Rybner worked as Rachmaninoff's assistant and taught at Barnard College, Columbia University and the Curtis Institute of Music. Eventually, she stopped touring as a pianist to spend more time composing. Her songs were performed by Mary Garden and Claude Cunningham. Her correspondence is archived in the Serge Koussevitzky Archive at the Library of Congress. Rybner's works were published by Breitkopf & Hartel, Carl Fischer Music, Oliver Ditson, Luckhardt & Belder, and G. Schirmer Inc. They include:

== Chamber ==
- works for violin

== Piano ==
- works for piano

== Vocal ==
- “A Song” (text by Clinton Scollard)
- “America” (text by Rollin John Wells)
- “Au Piano” (text by Jean Lahor; English translation by Theodore Baker)
- “Bid Me to Live” (text by Robert Herrick)
- “Chanson de Grandpere” (text by Victor Hugo)
- “Chinoiserie” (text by Pierre Jules Theophile Gautier)
- “Cyprian Woman” (Greek folksong; text by Margaret Widdemer)
- “Gavotte”
- God Knows Best (for mixed chorus)
- “In the Desert” (text by Louise Ayres Garnett)
- “O Rose of All Shiraz”
- “Pastorale” (text by Sara Teasdale)
- “Pierrot” (text by Sara Teasdale)
- “Slav Cradle Song” (text by William Blake)
- “Swans” (text by Sara Teasdale)
- “Te souvient il” (text by Jean Richepin)
- “Waterlily”
