= John Myers O'Hara =

American poet

John Myers O'Hara (1870–1944) was an American poet.

Born at Cedar Rapids, Iowa into a wealthy family from Chicago, he studied at Northwestern University, Evanston, Illinois. He was admitted to the bar and practiced law in Chicago for twelve years. In his thirties he moved permanently to New York, where he worked as a broker on Wall Street and also wrote poetry. In the 1929 stock market crash, O'Hara and his whole family lost their fortunes, but he continued to work in a brokerage house and write and publish poetry.

Besides his own poems, O'Hara also produced rather creative translations of Greek, Roman and French authors, such as the critically successful Poems of Sappho (1907). He also produced poetical works like Xochicuicatl ... : Flowersongs of Anahuac (1940) and Poems of Ming Wu (1941), which, while purporting to be translations from foreign literature, were actually completely original works. His own poetry collections, such as Songs of the Open (1909), Pagan Sonnets (1913), Manhattan (1915), Threnodies (1918) and Embers (1921), received favorable notice.

O'Hara was active in the poetical circles of his day and carried on an extensive correspondence with several women writers, most notably Sara Teasdale, Corinne Roosevelt Robinson, Jessie Belle Rittenhouse, Blanche Shoemaker Wagstaff and Leonora Speyer.

The first stanza of his poem Atavism (1902) is used as the epigraph to Jack London's The Call of the Wild:

Old longings nomadic leap,
Chafing at custom's chain;
Again from its brumal sleep
Wakens the ferine strain.
