= Margaret Widdemer =

American poet and novelist (1884–1978)

Margaret Widdemer (September 30, 1884 – July 14, 1978) was an American poet and novelist. She won the Pulitzer Prize (known then as the Columbia University Prize) in 1919 for her collection The Old Road to Paradise, shared with Carl Sandburg for Cornhuskers. (Note: The Pulitzer Prize for Poetry was inaugurated in 1922 but the sponsoring organization now considers the first winners to be the three recipients of 1918 and 1919 awards "made possible by a special grant from The Poetry Society".)

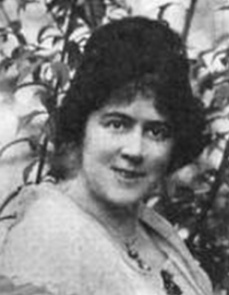
Margaret Widdemer was an American poet and novelist.

== Biography ==
Margaret Widdemer was born in Doylestown, Pennsylvania, and grew up in Asbury Park, New Jersey, where her father, Howard T. Widdemer, was a minister of the First Congregational Church. She graduated from the Drexel Institute Library School in 1909. She first came to public attention with her poem The Factories, which treated the subject of child labor. In 1919, she married Robert Haven Schauffler (1879–1964), a widower five years her senior. Schauffler was an author and cellist who published widely on poetry, travel, culture, and music. His papers are held at the University of Texas at Austin.

Widdemer's memoir Golden Years I Had recounts her friendships with eminent authors such as Ezra Pound, F. Scott Fitzgerald, T. S. Eliot, Thornton Wilder, and Edna St. Vincent Millay.

Swiss-German composer Dagmar Rybner used Widdemer’s text for her song “Cyprian Woman.”

Widdemer died in Gloversville, Fulton County, NY on July 14, 1978.

== Works ==
=== Poetry collections ===
- The Factories, With Other Lyrics (1915)
- The Old Road to Paradise (1918)
- Cross Currents (1921)
- A Tree with a Bird in It (1922) (parodies)
- Little Girl and Boy Land (1924)
- Ballads and Lyrics (1925)
- Collected Poems (1928)
- The Road to Downderry (1931)
- Hill Garden (1937)
- Dark Cavalier (1958)

=== Children's fiction ===
- Winona of the Camp Fire (1915)
- Winona of Camp Karonya (1917)
- You're Only Young Once (1918)
- Winona's War Farm (1918)
- Winona's Way (1919)
- Winona on her Own (1922)
- Winona's Dreams Come True (1923)
- Binkie and the Bell Dolls (1923)
- Marcia's Farmhouse (1939)

=== On writing ===
- Do You Want to Write? (1937)
- Basic Principles of Fiction Writing (1953)

=== Memoir ===
- Golden Friends I Had (1964)
- Summers at the Colony (1964)
- Jessie Rittenhouse: A Centenary Memoir-Anthology (1969)

=== Adult fiction ===
- The Rose-Garden Husband (1915) – adapted as the 1917 film A Wife on Trial
- Why Not? (1916) – adapted as the 1918 film The Dream Lady
- The Wishing Ring Man (1919) – adapted as the film The Wishing Ring Man
- The Boardwalk (1919)
- I’ve Married Marjorie (1920)
- The Boardwalk (1920)
- The Year of Delight (1921)
- A Minister of Grace (1922)
- Graven Image (1923)
- Charis Sees It Through (1924)
- The Singing Wood (1926)
- Gallant Lady (1926)
- More Than Wife (1927)
- Loyal Lover (1929)
- Rhinestones (1929)
- All the King's Horses (1930)
- The Truth About Lovers (1931)
- The Pre-War Lady (1932)
- The Years of Love (1933)
- Golden Rain (1933)
- The Other Lovers (1934)
- Eve's Orchard (1935)
- Back to Virtue, Betty (1935)
- Songs for a Christmas Tree (1935)
- This Isn't the End (1936)
- Marriage is Possible (1936)
- Ladies Go Masked (1939)
- Hand on Her Shoulder (1939)
- She Knew Three Brothers (1939)
- Someday I'll Find You (1940)
- Lover's Alibi (1941)
- Angela Comes Home (1942)
- Constancia Herself (1945)
- Let Me Have Wings (1945)
- Lani (1949)
- Red Cloak Flying (1950)
- Lady of the Mohawks (1951)
- The Great Pine's Son (1954)
- The Golden Wildcat (1957)
- Buckskin Baronet (1960)
- The Red Castle Women (1968)
