= If I Never Get Back =

1990 novel by Darryl Brock

- Author: Darryl Brock
- Language: English
- Genre: Historical fiction
- Set in: Cincinnati, Ohio (1869)
- Publisher: Crown Publishing Group
- Publication date: 1990
- Publication place: United States
- Media type: Print
- Pages: 424
- ISBN: 0517573458
- OCLC: 299747835
- Dewey Decimal: 813.54
- LC Class: PS3552.R58
- Followed by: Two in the Field

If I Never Get Back is the 1990 debut novel of American writer Darryl Brock.

In the novel, a modern-day San Francisco journalist named Sam Fowler steps off an Amtrak train and finds himself in 1869. He joins the Cincinnati Red Stockings baseball team, meets Mark Twain, and falls in love with a woman of the times. The novel takes its name from lyrics in the baseball-themed song, "Take Me Out to the Ball Game".

== Critical reception ==
The New York Times said the book "takes the reader out to the old ball game with great charm", while the Los Angeles Times called it "the wildest and most satisfying yarn since W. P. Kinsella's Shoeless Joe".

== Legacy ==
Because of its detailed description of nineteenth century baseball rules, the book is said to have inspired many Vintage Base Ball clubs to form throughout the United States. Brock said of these clubs, "They invite me to their conventions because my character does what they all want to do: They want to go back in time."

== Sequel ==
Brock wrote a sequel in 2002 entitled, Two in the Field. In the novel, Sam Fowler goes back in time again, to 1875.
