= Fred Goldsmith (baseball) =

American baseball player (1856–1939)

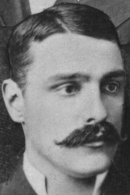
- Pitcher
- Born: May 15, 1856; New Haven, Connecticut, U.S.
- Died: March 28, 1939 (aged 82); Berkley, Michigan, U.S.
- Batted: Right Threw: Right

Major-league debut
- October 23, 1875, for the New Haven Elm Citys

Last major-league appearance
- September 10, 1884, for the Baltimore Orioles

Major-league statistics
- Win–loss record: 112–68
- Earned run average: 2.73
- Complete games: 174
- Stats at Baseball Reference

Teams
- New Haven Elm Citys (1875); Troy Trojans (1879); Chicago White Stockings (1880–1884); Baltimore Orioles (1884)

Fredrick Ernest Goldsmith (May 15, 1856 – March 28, 1939) was an American right-handed pitcher in 19th-century professional baseball in both the U.S. and Canada. In his prime, Goldsmith was six-foot-one-inch tall and weighed 195 pounds.

== Goldsmith's professional career ==
Goldsmith pitched professionally for the New Haven Elm Citys (1875); the London Tecumsehs (1876); after the Tecumsehs joined the fledgling International Association, the Troy Trojans of the National League (1879); the Chicago White Stockings of the National League (1880–1884) and briefly for the Baltimore Orioles of the American Association (1884).

Pitching for the Chicago White Stockings, Goldsmith had four seasons with 20 wins or more: 1880 (21–3); 1881 (24–13); 1882 (28–17); 1883 (25–19).

During Goldsmith's five-season stint pitching for the Chicago White Stockings, he played with first baseman Cap Anson and for team President A.G. Spalding, when Chicago won several league pennants. Goldsmith's final game in the pro ranks was on September 10, 1884.

== The great curveball debate: Goldsmith or Cummings? ==
Invention of the curveball is widely credited to Candy Cummings. However, another claimant was Fred Goldsmith, Cummings' rival when the two played in the International Association for Professional Base Ball Players in 1877–78—Goldsmith with the pennant-winning London Tecumsehs and Cummings with the Lynn, Massachusetts, Live Oaks. Cummings was also the first president of the International Association when he pitched for and managed the Lynn Live Oaks.

In his biography of Cummings, Stephen Katz describes Cummings' invention of the curveball in the early 1860s and his first known use of the pitch in 1867, when he pitched for the Brooklyn Excelsiors in a game in Cambridge, Massachusetts, against the Harvard College team.

Goldsmith maintained that he gave a demonstration of the pitch on August 16, 1870, at the Capitoline Grounds in Brooklyn, New York, and that renown sportswriter Henry Chadwick had covered it in the Brooklyn Eagle on August 17, 1870. However, Stephen Katz, in his biography of Cummings, shows that Goldsmith's claim was not credible, and that Goldsmith's reference to an article by Chadwick in the Brooklyn Eagle was likely fabricated.

Nevertheless, some writers in the first half of the twentieth century credited Goldsmith with having invented the curveball. Sportscaster-American actor Bill Stern waded into the debate in 1949 with a "favorite story" firmly crediting Goldsmith as the inventor and with transforming baseball. (See Bill Stern on the curveball.)

Additionally, an article in The London Free Press (Fred Goldsmith Invented The Curveball) of June 21, 1939, credits Goldsmith with inventing the curveball and says that "Just three days following Fred Goldsmith's death [on March 28, 1939], The Sporting News devoted an editorial to Goldsmith's feat of 61 years ago and asked that he be officially recognized as the inventor of the curve ball." However, The Sporting News article says no such thing. Instead, it states: "Nearly all the authorities give the distinction of discovering and perfecting the curve ball to Cummings ..."

Further, an article in the August 2, 1938, London Free Press (Nick Altrock Is Here For Today) indicates that former Major League pitcher Nick Altrock also believed that Goldsmith invented the curveball. Altrock and Goldsmith were in London, Ontario, for an Old Boys Reunion and afternoon game at Labatt Park between a team from Battle Creek, Michigan, and a London Seniors team.

Ironically, Cummings was elected to the Baseball Hall of Fame in Cooperstown, New York in 1939—the same year that Goldsmith died.

== Images of Fred Goldsmith ==
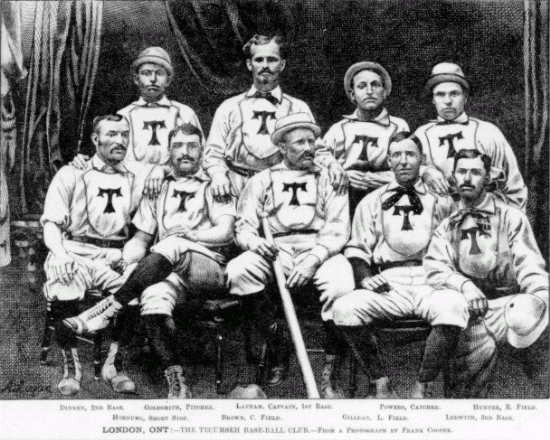
1. London Tecumsehs Team – Fred Goldsmith (1st row, 2nd from left)
(1876–1878)

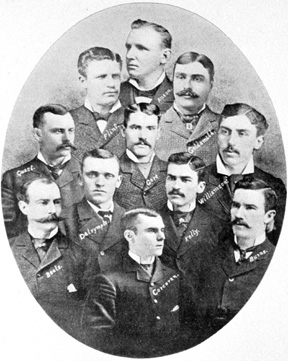
2. Chicago White Stockings Team Photo – Fred Goldsmith (upper right)
(1880)
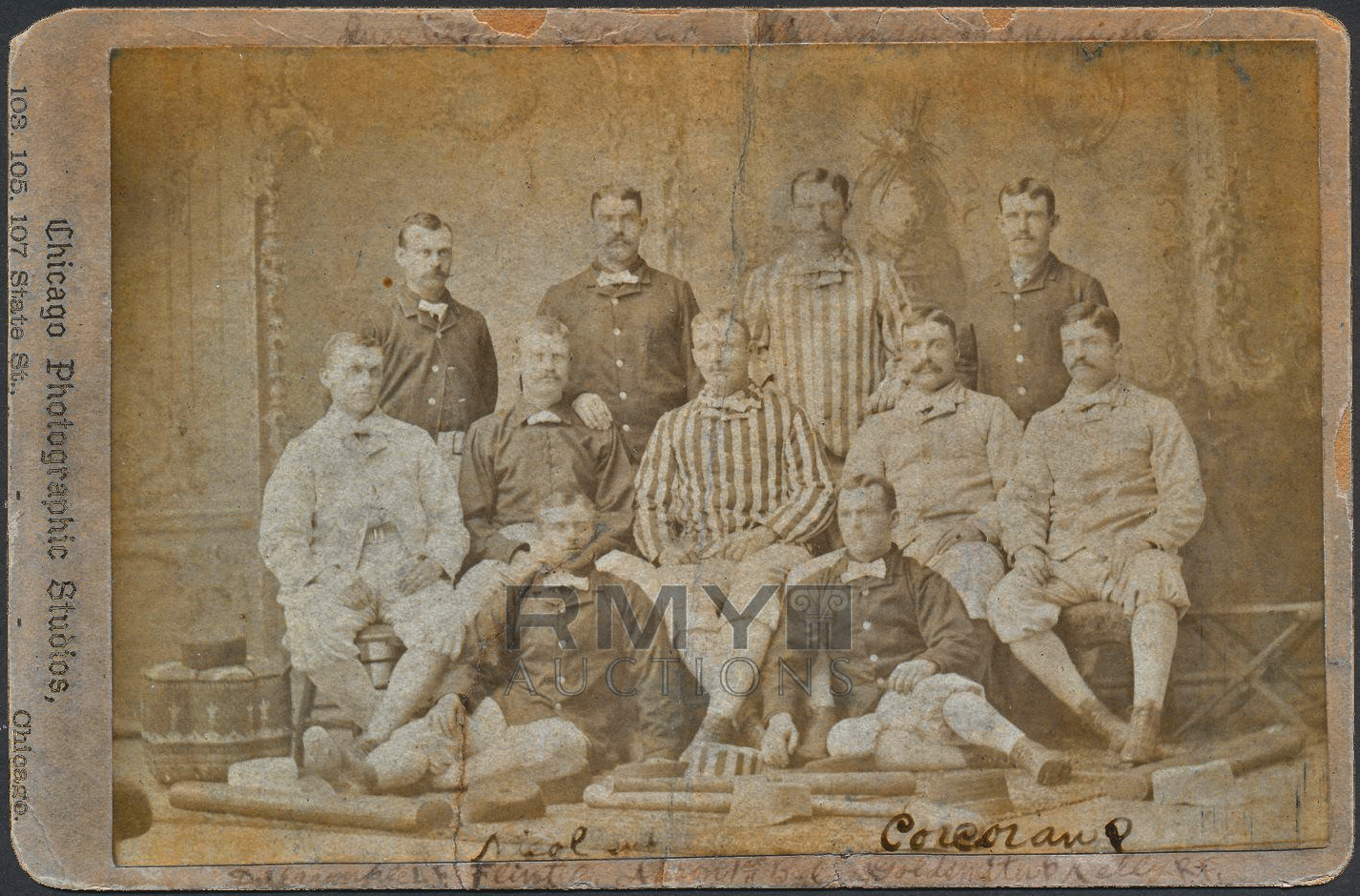
3. Chicago White Stocking Team Photo – Fred Goldsmith (2nd row, 2nd from right)
(1882)

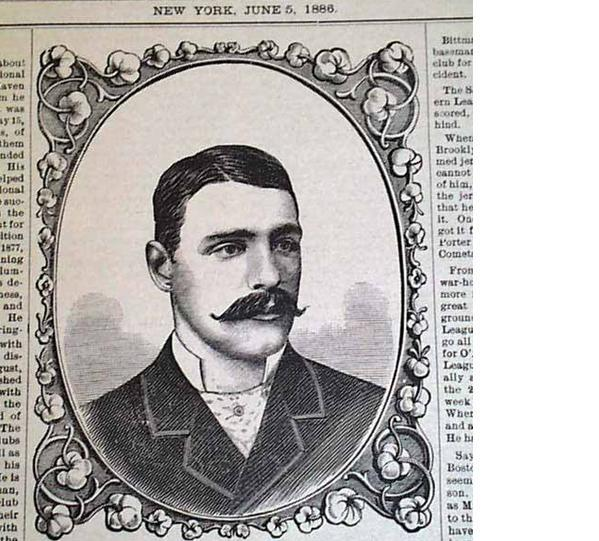
4. Fred Goldsmith Sketch from the Official Baseball Record which includes biography
(1886)

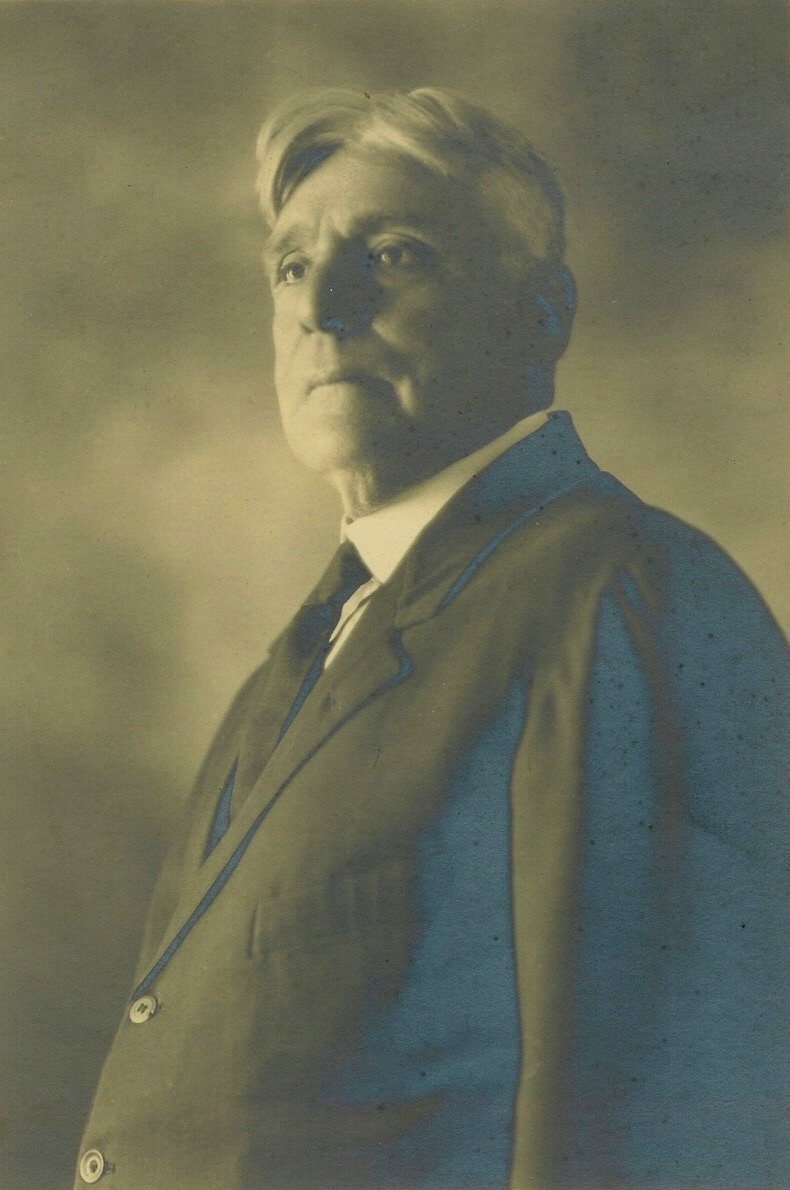
5. Fred Goldsmith Photo from family archives.
(1920s)

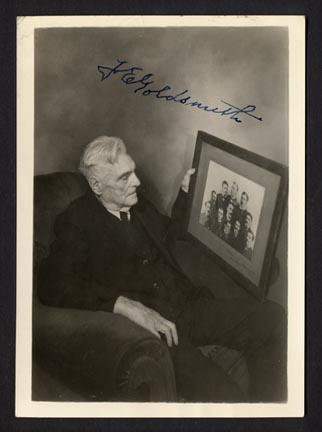
6. Fred Goldsmith Photo of himself looking at the Chicago White Stockings team photo.
(late 1930s)
