= Clinton Scollard =

American poet

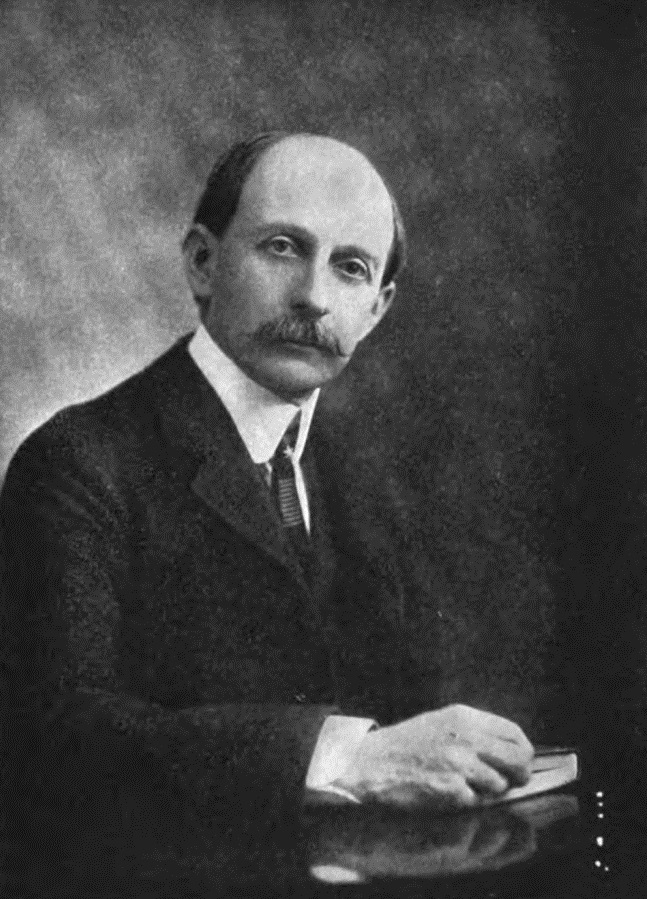
- Clinton Scollard, 1902
- Born: September 18, 1860; Clinton, New York
- Died: November 19, 1932 (aged 72); Kent, Connecticut
- Education: Harvard University; Cambridge University
- Alma mater: Hamilton College (1881)
- Occupation: Poet
- Notable work: "As I Came Down from Lebanon"
- Spouses: Georgia Brown (m. 1890; div. 1924) Jessie Belle Rittenhouse (m. 1924)
- Children: Elizabeth Parlon
- Parent(s): Dr. James I. and Elizabeth S. Scollard

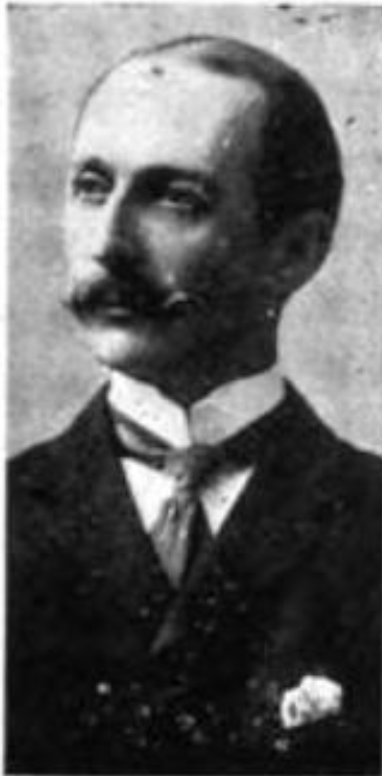
Scollard in 1906

Clinton Scollard (1860–1932) was an American poet and writer of fiction. He was a Professor of English at Hamilton College.

== Professional career ==
Scollard was born at Clinton, Oneida County, New York on September 18, 1860, son of James Isaac and Mary Elizabeth (Stevens) Scollard. He graduated from the Clinton Liberal Institute in 1877 and Hamilton College in 1881, and in 1881–1883 attended Harvard University, where his friends included poets Bliss Carman and Frank Dempster Sherman. At Hamilton, where he was a member of the Chi Psi fraternity, he played varsity baseball and is credited with introducing the curveball to college baseball.

After a period in Cambridge, Massachusetts, he spent two years at the University of Cambridge in England. In 1888 he became an Associate Professor of English at Hamilton College, where he remained until 1896. He built the house at 70 College St. in Clinton. Except for a further year in the English Department at Hamilton College in 1911, he devoted the rest of his life to creative writing. Hamilton granted him an honorary L.H.D. in 1906.

=== Associates ===
Scollard corresponded with Martha Foote Crowe. Oley Speaks composed the song "Sylvia" to lyrics by Scollard. Dagmar de Corval Rybner used Scollard’s text for her composition “A Song.”

== Family ==
On July 3, 1890 Scollard married Georgia Brown of Jackson, Michigan; they had one daughter Elizabeth Scollard Parlon, but they divorced in early 1924. "On March 20, 1924, Scollard married fellow poet Jessie Belle Rittenhouse in Carmel-by-the-Sea, California." They had no children.

Clinton Scollard died at his home in Kent, Connecticut on November 19, 1932.

== Assessment ==
Scollard has been characterized as a minor poet but a fine technician:

He knew himself to be a fine craftsman, able to fashion delicate lyrics that forbear contemplative weight for perfection in form. His verse delights in the natural world, in small incidents that are honed to perfection. It is easy to view him as a Frost without the philosophy.

== Principal works of verse ==
- Pictures in Song (1884)
- With Reed and Lyre (1886)
- Old and New World Lyrics (1888)
- Songs of Sunrise Lands (1982)
- Under Summer Skies (1892)
- On Sunny Shores (1893)
- The Hills of Song (1895)
- The Lutes of Morn (1901)
- Lyrics of the Dawn (1902)
- The Lyric Bough (1904)
- A Southern Flight (1906) (with Frank Dempster Sherman)
- Blank Verse Pastels (1907)
- Chords of the Zither (1910)
- Poems (1914)
- Sprays of Shamrock (1914)
- Italy in Arms, and Other Poems (1915)
- Vale of Shadows and Other Verses of the Great War (1915)
- Ballads, Patriotic and Romantic (1916)
- The Poems of Frank Dempster Sherman, Ed. Clinton Scollard (1917)
- Lyrics From a Library (1917)
- The Golden Bough (1924)
- The Bird-Lovers' Anthology, Compiled by Clinton Scollard and Jessie Belle Rittenhouse (1930)
- Patrician Rhymes; a Résumé of American Society Verse from Philip Freneau to the Present Day, Ed. by Clinton Scollard and Jessie B. Rittenhouse (1932)
- Songs from a Southern Shore (1932)
- The Singing Heart; Selected Lyrics and Other Poems of Clinton Scollard Ed. by Jessie B. Rittenhouse (1934)
