= The Daily Graphic =

American newspaper

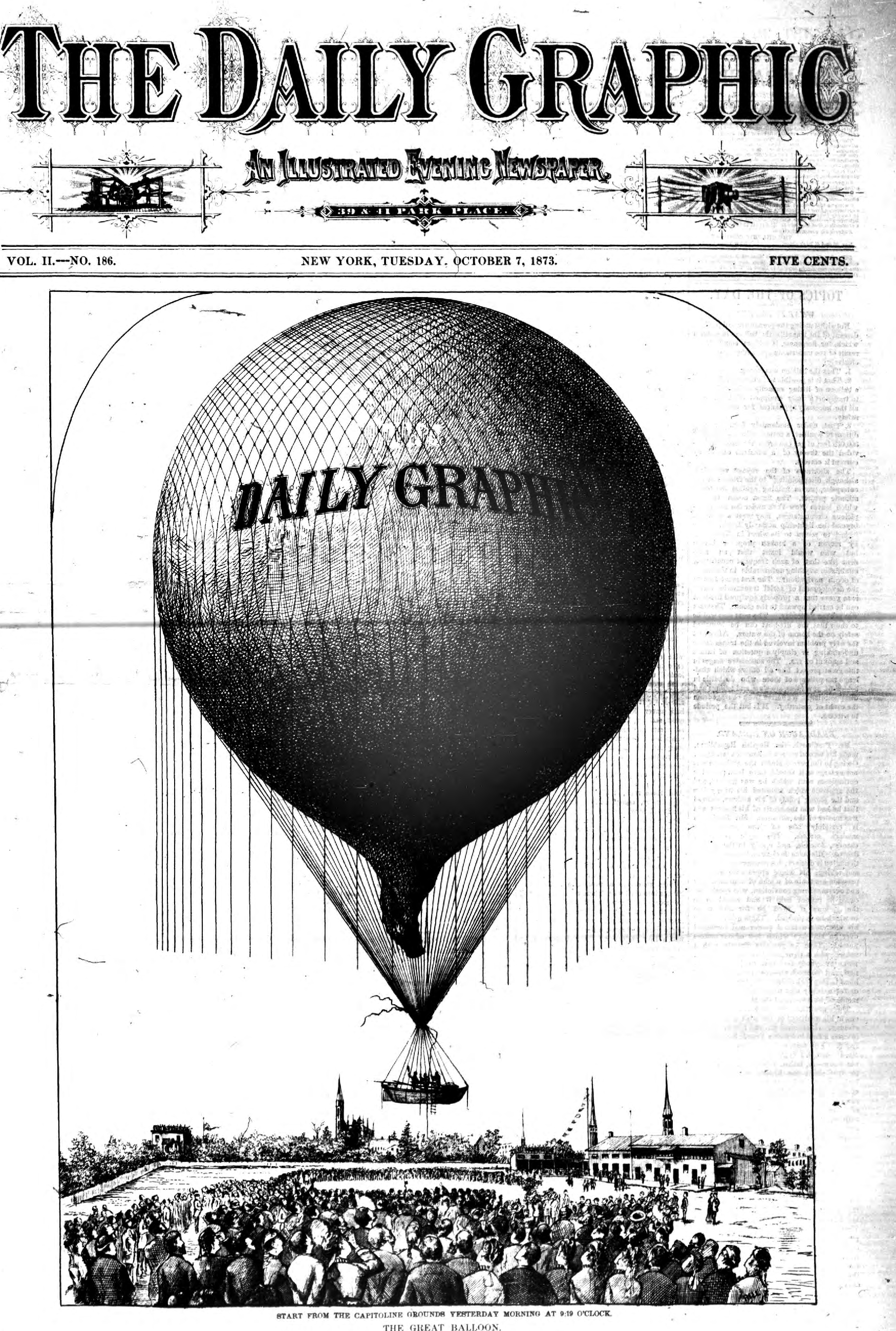
- October 7, 1873 front page, showing Washington Donaldson's balloon team ascending in an ill-fated attempt to cross the Atlantic
- Type: Daily
- Format: Tabloid
- Founded: March 4, 1873
- Ceased publication: September 23, 1889
- Headquarters: 39 & 41 Park Place, Manhattan, New York
- Circulation: 10,000 at peak
- Price: Five cents (1873); Three cents (1889)
- ISSN: 2641-0648
- OCLC number: 2260092

The Daily Graphic: An Illustrated Evening Newspaper was the first American newspaper with daily illustrations. It was founded in New York City in 1873 by Canadian engravers George-Édouard Desbarats and William Leggo, and began publication in March of that year. It continued publication until September 23, 1889.

== History ==
Flush with their printing success in Canada, Desbarats and Leggo relocated to New York in 1873 to found The Daily Graphic. Highly illustrated, its lavish engravings included cartoons, reproductions of paintings, and illustrations of contemporary news events and notable personalities. While pioneering, the paper was not a financial success, and Desbarats later returned to Montreal, with Leggo following at least by 1879.

The business management of the paper was initially headed up by Charles and James Goodsell. David Croly, former managing editor of the New York World, was the initial editor of the paper, serving from 1873 through 1878. Mark Twain wryly commented to Croly after seeing the first issue: "I don't care much about reading ... but I do like to look at pictures, and the illustrated weeklies do not come as often as I need them." Croly was an admirer of Walt Whitman, and published a number of his poems in the Graphic.

An early publicity stunt pulled by the Graphic in 1873 was the sponsoring of a cross-Atlantic balloon trip by Washington Donaldson. The flight proved unsuccessful, but it did draw significant attention to the paper.

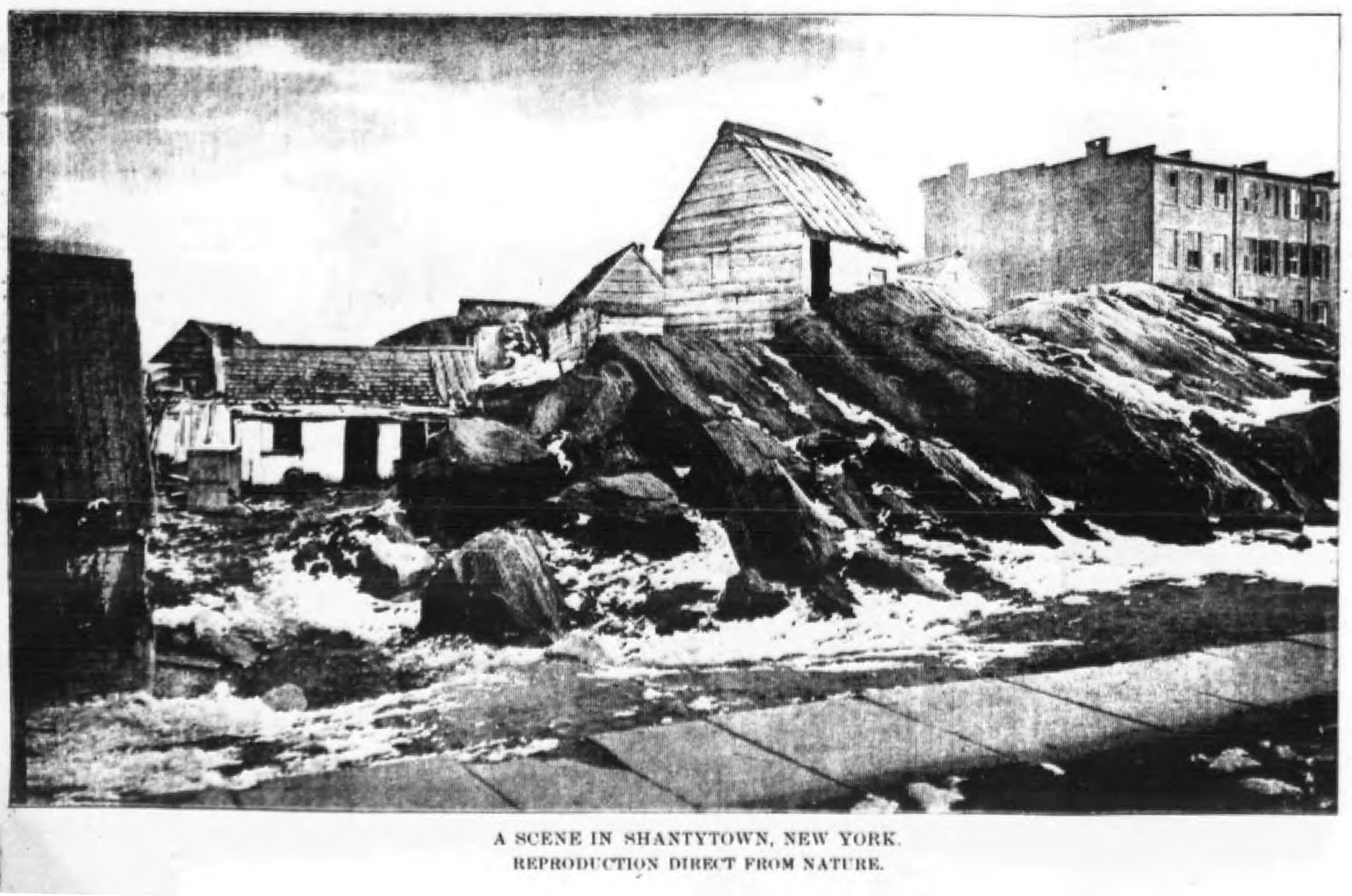
A Scene in Shantytown, New York, March 4, 1880, the first newspaper photo printed using a halftone screen.

Engraver Stephen Henry Horgan helped push the photographic printing efforts of the paper. The paper published an image of Steinway Hall from a photograph on December 2, 1873. And "A Scene in Shantytown, New York" appeared in the March 4, 1880 issue; the first halftone photograph ever printed by a newspaper.

The Daily Graphic was also the first American paper to print a daily weather map, which started in its May 9, 1879 edition. The U.S. government provided the map through its Weather Services and paid the paper $10 a day to run it, which ran through September 1882 when the service ended.

Isaac M. Gregory served as editor of the paper from 1882-1885 before moving on to edit Judge magazine.

A Weekly Graphic compilation was also offered by the paper, and was available by delivery by mail.

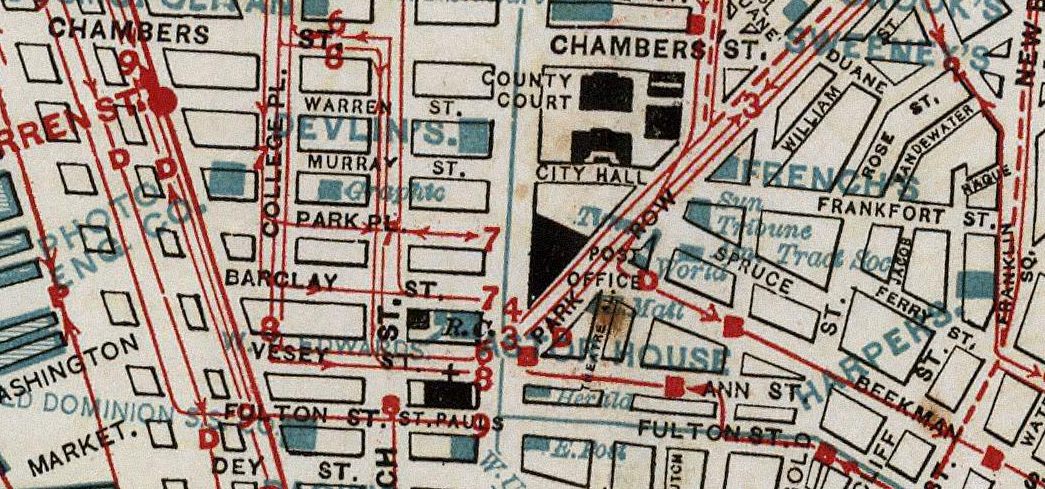
Detail of 1877 New York City map by D.A. Edsall & Co., showing location of the Graphic offices at 39 & 41 Park Place.

== Other papers ==
The London newspaper The Graphic, which was founded in 1869, commenced publication of its own "The Daily Graphic" on January 4, 1890. It was illustrated with line drawings and woodcuts; photoengraving and halftone was considered too complex a process.

The Daily Graphic was not connected with the New York Evening Graphic, published from 1924 to 1932, and most famous for Walter Winchell's gossip column.

== Reproduced from The Daily Graphic ==
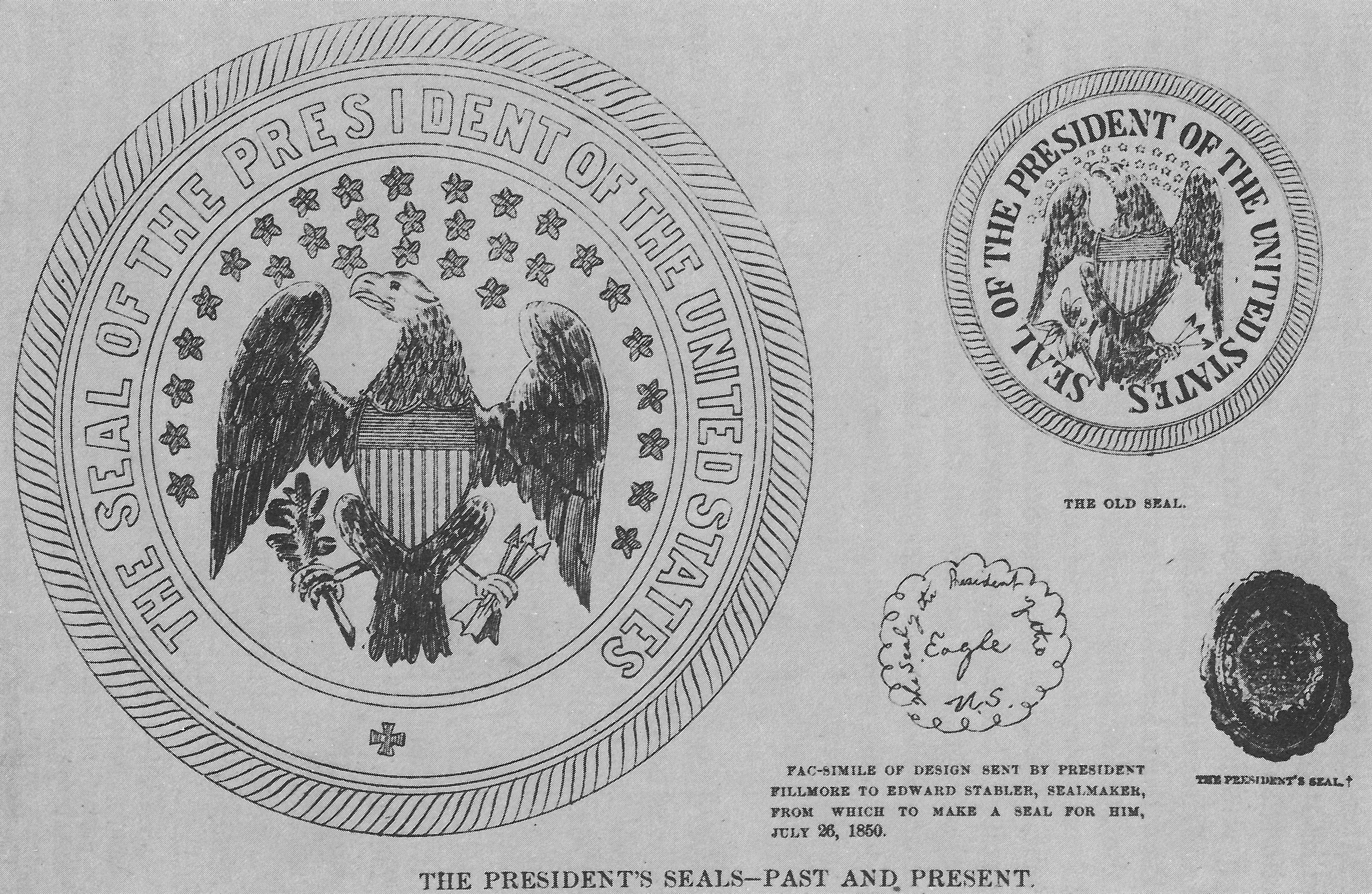
Seal of the president of the United States, 1885 Daily Graphic

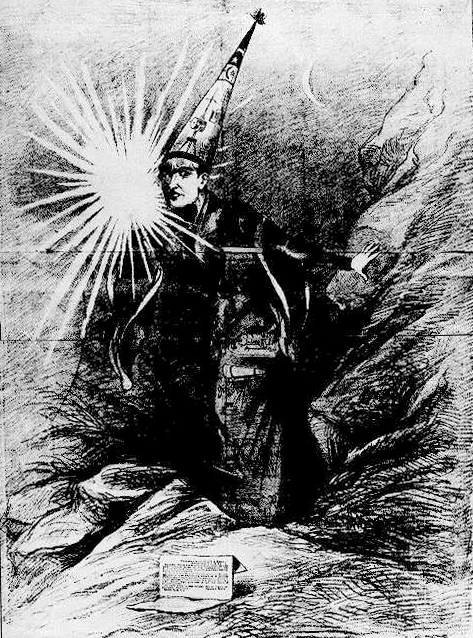
"The Wizard's Search" - 9 July 1879 New York Daily Graphic

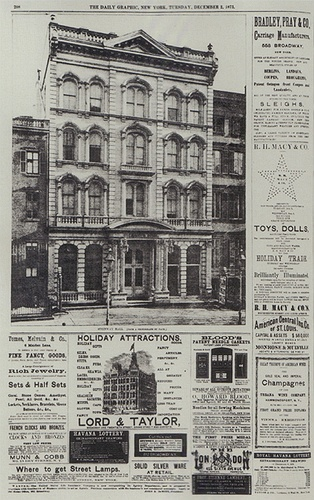
Steinway Hall, Daily Graphic 1873

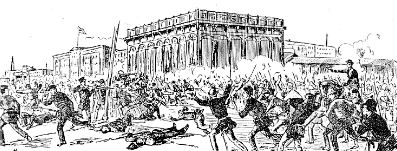
Battle of Liberty Place, Sept 23, 1874 Daily Graphic

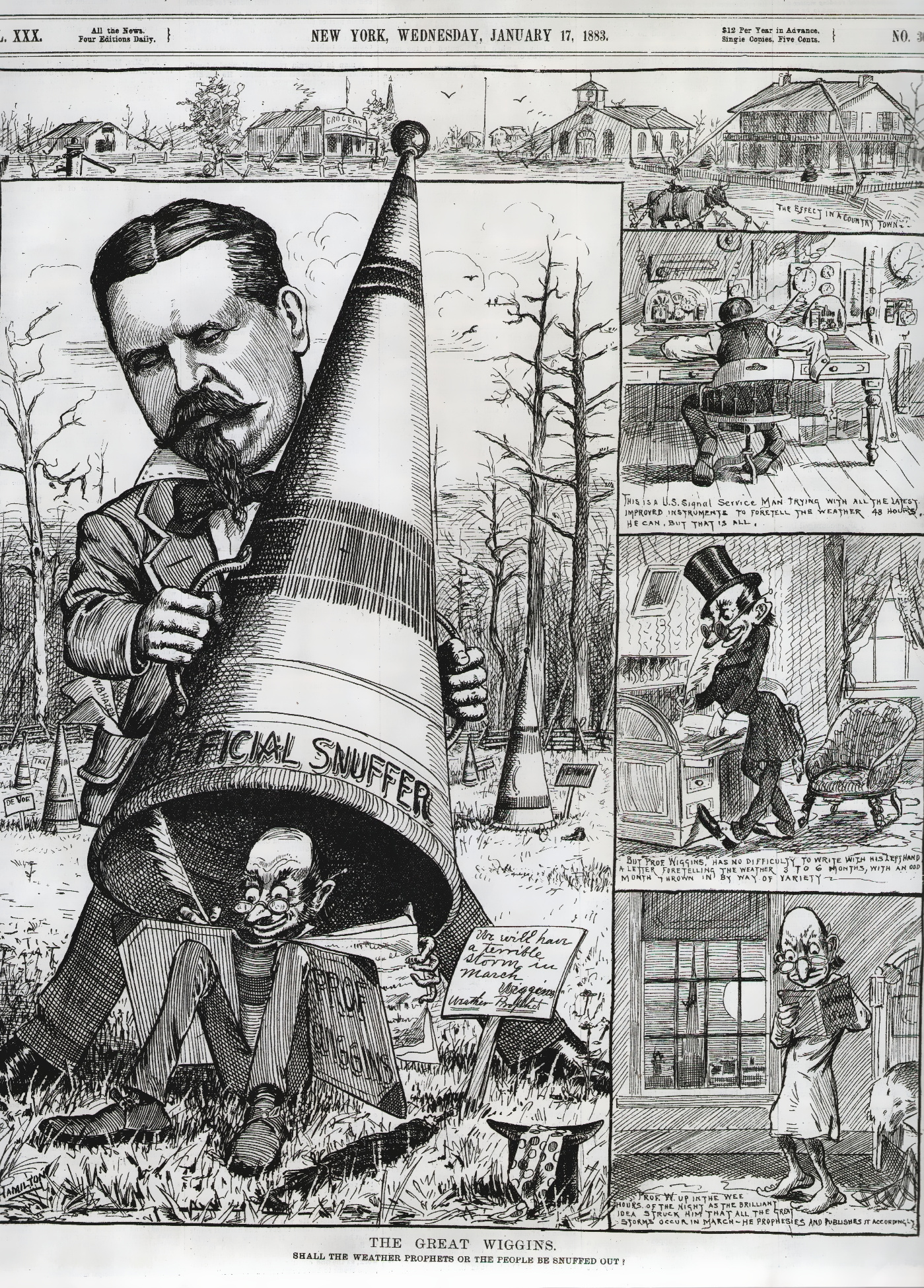
Ezekiel Stone Wiggins prophesy - Jan 17 1883 by Grant E. Hamilton
