= Desbarats =

Desbarats is a surname. Notable people with the surname include:

- George-Paschal Desbarats (1808–1864), Canadian printer, publisher, businessman, and landowner
- George-Édouard Desbarats (1838–1893), Canadian printer and inventor
- George Joseph Desbarats (1861–1944), Canadian engineer and civil servant
- Michelle Desbarats, Canadian poet
- Peter Desbarats (1933–2014), Canadian writer, playwright and journalist

== Locations ==
- Desbarats, Ontario, a community in Canada
- Desbarats Strait, in the Arctic Archipelago in Canada
- Desbarats River, a tributary of the Etchemin River in Canada
