= List of people on the postage stamps of Canada =

This is a list of notable people on stamps of Canada since confederation in 1867. For earlier stamps issued by the colonies which came together to form Canada, see List of people on the postage stamps of the Canadian provinces.

== A ==
- John Abbott (1952)
- Bryan Adams (2009)
- Pierrette Alarie (2006)
- Emma Albani (1980)
- Lincoln Alexander (2018)
- Alexandra of Denmark (1908)
- Paul Anka (2007)
- Syl Apps (2001)
- Louise Arbour (2012)
- Pitseolak Ashoona (1993)
- Margaret Atwood (2021)
- Philippe-Joseph Aubert de Gaspé (1986)

== B ==
- Robert Baldwin (1927)
- Frederick Banting (1991)
- Robert Bartlett (2009)
- Jean Béliveau (2001)
- Alexander Graham Bell (1947)
- Frederic Marlett Bell-Smith (1928)
- Richard Bedford Bennett (1955, 1972)
- William Andrew Cecil Bennett (1998)
- Joseph Bernier (1977)
- Trefflé Berthiaume (1984)
- Carrie Best (2011)
- Norman Bethune (1990)
- Billy Bishop (1994)
- Martha Black (1997)
- Joseph Armand Bombardier (2000)
- W. Hanson Boorne (1989)
- Robert Laird Borden (1951, 1972)
- Mike Bossy (2003)
- Henri Bourassa (1968)
- Marguerite Bourgeoys (1975)
- Ray Bourque (2003)
- Mackenzie Bowell (1954)
- Elizabeth Bowes-Lyon (1937)
- John Bracken (1998)
- Molly Brant (1986)
- Isaac Brock (1969, 2012)
- George Brown (1968)
- Rosemary Brown (2009)
- Étienne Brûlé (1987)
- Raymond Burr (2008)
- Cheryl Bush (2010)
- Edith Butler (2009)
- John By (1979)

== C ==
- John Cabot (1986)
- Morley Callaghan (2003)
- John Candy (2006)
- Réal Caouette (1997)
- Emily Carr (1971)
- George-Étienne Cartier (1931)
- Jacques Cartier (1984)
- Ethel Catherwood (1996)
- Therese Casgrain (1985)
- René-Robert Cavelier (1966)
- Samuel de Champlain (1908)
- Robert Charlebois (2009)
- Lionel Chevrier (1997)
- Samuel Dwight Chown (1975)
- Winston Churchill (1965)
- Sheila Watt-Cloutier (2012)
- Bruce Cockburn (2011)
- Leonard Cohen (2019)
- Napoléon-Alexandre Comeau (1998)
- Stompin’ Tom Connors (2009)
- James Cook, explorer (1978)
- John Cook (1975)
- Donald G. Creighton (1996)
- Crowfoot (1986)

== D ==
- Mathieu da Costa (2017)
- Charles Daudelin (2002)
- Georges-Édouard Desbarats (1987)
- Alphonse Desjardins (1975)
- Etienne Desmarteau (1996)
- Viola Desmond (2012)
- John Diefenbaker (1980)
- Adam Dollard des Ormeaux (1960)
- Tommy Douglas (1998, 2012)
- Marie Dressler (2008)
- Gabriel Dumont (1985)
- Bill Durnan (2003)

== E ==
- Timothy Eaton (1994)
- Edward VII of the United Kingdom (1903)
- Henrietta Edwards (1981)
- Louise Edwards (2002)
- Princess Elizabeth of York (1935)
  - As Elizabeth II of Canada (1952 – 2022)
- Phil Esposito (2002)

== F ==
- Charles Fenerty (1987)
- Reginald Aubrey Fessenden (1987)
- Sanford Fleming (1977, 2002)
- Maureen Forrester
- Harry Foster (1998)
- Michael J. Fox (2012)
- Terry Fox (1982, 2000)
- Benjamin Franklin (1976)
- John Franklin (1989)
- Louis Fréchette (1989)
- George Arthur French (1973)
- Martin Frobisher (1963)
- Louis de Buade de Frontenac (1972)
- Northrop Frye (2000)

== G ==
- Charles-Émile Gadbois (1997)
- Hector de Saint-Denys Garneau (2003)
- Pierre Gaultier de Varennes, sieur de La Vérendrye (text is only "La Vérendrye" on the stamp) (1958)
- George V of the United Kingdom (1908)
- George VI of Canada (1935)
- Chief Dan George (2008)
- Marie-Joséphine Gérin-Lajoie (1993)
- Abraham Gesner (2000)
- Humphrey Gilbert (1983)
- Frederick Newton Gisborne (1987)
- Lorne Greene (2006)
- Wilfred Grenfell (1965)
- Wayne Gretzky (2000)
- Harold Griffith (1991)
- Medard Chouart des Groselliers (1987)
- Frederick Philip Grove (1979)
- Germaine Guèvremont (1976)
- Casimir Gzowski (1963)

== H ==
- Thomas C. Haliburton (1996)
- Glenn Hall (2002)
- William Hall (2010)
- Ned Hanlan, oarsman (1980)
- Rick Hansen (2012)
- Doug Harvey (2000)
- Anne Hébert (2003)
- Louis Hébert (1985)
- Louis Hémon (1975)
- Alexander Henderson (1989)
- Josiah Henson (1983)
- Adelaide Sophia Hoodless (1993)
- Frances Anne Hopkins (1988)
- Tim Horton (2002)
- Gordie Howe (2000)
- Joseph Howe (1973)
- Henry Hudson (1986)
- Bobby Hull (2001)
- John Peters Humphrey (1998)

== I ==
- Marie de l'Incarnation (1981)
- Charles Inglis (1988)

== J ==
- William Jackman (1992)
- Albert Jackson (2019)
- Fergie Jenkins (2011)
- Norman Jewison (2024)
- Raoul Jobin (2006)
- E. Pauline Johnson (1961)
- Edward Johnson (2006)
- Louis Jolliet (1987)
- J. Walter Jones (1998)

== K ==
- Paul Kane (1971)
- Red Kelly (2002)
- Henry Kelsey (1970)
- William Lyon Mackenzie King (1951, 1972)
- Helen Kinnear (1993)
- Cornelius Krieghoff, painter (1972)
- Jose Kusugak, indigenous leader (2022)

== L ==
- Antoine Labelle (1983)
- Emmanuel-Persillier Lachapelle (1980)
- Guy Lafleur (2002)
- Louis-Hippolyte Lafontaine (1927)
- Judy LaMarsh (1997)
- Archibald Lampman (1989)
- Margaret Laurence (1996)
- Wilfrid Laurier (1927, 1972)
- Pierre Laporte (1971)
- François de Montmorency-Laval (1973)
- Calixa Lavallée (1980)
- Stephen Leacock (1969)
- Roméo LeBlanc (2010) Governor General
- Félix Leclerc (2000)
- Jules Léger (1977, 1982)
- William Leggo (1987)
- Jean Lesage (1998)
- Gordon Lightfoot (2007)
- Arthur Lismer (1970)
- Jules-Ernest Livernois (1989)
- Kay Livingstone (2018)
- Tom Longboat (2000)

== M ==
- Angus L. MacDonald (1998)
- James MacDonald (1973)
- John A. Macdonald (1927, 1972)
- Alexander Mackenzie (1952)
- Sir Alexander Mackenzie (1970)
- James F. MacLeod (1986)
- John Macoun (1981)
- Agnes Macphail (1990)
- Frank Mahovlich (2003)
- Jeanne Mance (1973)
- Ernest C. Manning (1998)
- Guglielmo Marconi (1974, 2002)
- Frère Marie-Victorin (1981)
- Princess Margaret (1939)
- Jacques Marquette (1987)
- Bill Mason (1998)
- Matonabbee (1989)
- Mary of Teck (1908)
- Vincent Massey (1969, 1977)
- Nellie McClung (1973)
- John McCrae (1968)
- Anna McGarrigle (2011)
- Kate McGarrigle (2011)
- Thomas D'Arcy McGee (1927)
- Louise McKinney (1981)
- Sarah McLachlan (2024)
- Marshall McLuhan (2000)
- John B. McNair (1998)
- Arthur Meighen (1961)
- William Merritt (1974)
- Mike Myers (2014)
- Daniel Roland Michener (1977, 1992)
- Stan Mikita (2003)
- Joni Mitchell (2007)
- W.O. Mitchell (2000)
- Leo Mol (2002)
- John Molson (1986)
- Joseph Montferrand (1992)
- Louis Joseph de Montcalm (1908)
- Lucy Maud Montgomery (1975)
- Édouard Montpetit (1996)
- Susanna Moodie (2003)
- Howie Morenz (2002)
- Aaron R. Mosher (1981)
- Oliver Mowat (1970)
- Phyllis Munday (1998)
- Anne Murray (2007)
- Emily Murphy (1985)

== N ==
- Émile Nelligan (1979)
- William Notman (1989)
- Northern Dancer (1999)

== O ==
- Bobby Orr (2000)
- William Osler (1969)
- Gerald Ouellette (1996)

== P ==
- Louis-Joseph Papineau (1971)
- Lester Pearson (1972)
- Wilder Penfield (1991)
- Oscar Peterson (2005)
- Prince Philip, Duke of Edinburgh (1951)
- Mary Pickford (2006)
- Jacques Plante (2000)
- Christopher Plummer (2021)
- Jerry Potts (1992)
- Denis Potvin (2001)

== R ==
- Pierre Esprit Radisson (1987)
- Maurice Richard (2000)
- Louis Riel (1970)
- Ginette Reno (2011)
- John Robarts (1998)
- Robbie Robertson (2011)
- Fanny Rosenfeld (1996)
- Adolphe-Basile Routhier (1980)
- Gabrielle Roy (1996)
- Ernest Rutherford (1971)

== S ==
- Idola Saint-Jean (1981)
- Louis St. Laurent (1972)
- Charles-Michel d'Irumberry de Salaberry (1979)
- Jeanne Sauvé (1994)
- Félix-Antoine Savard (1996)
- Serge Savard (2003)
- Terry Sawchuk (2001)
- Laura Secord (1992)
- Lord Selkirk (1962)
- Robert W. Service (1976)
- Abraham Doras Shadd (2009)
- Norma Shearer (2008)
- Eddie Shore (2001)
- Joseph R. Smallwood (1998)
- Donald Alexander Smith (1970)
- Léopold Simoneau (2006)
- Vilhjalmur Stefansson (1989)
- Emily Stowe (1981)
- Marc Aurèle de Foy Suzor-Coté (1969)

== T ==
- Jean Talon (1962)
- Chief Tecumseh (2012)
- Kateri Tekakwitha (1981)
- David Thompson (1957)
- Tom Thomson (1977)
- John Sparrow David Thompson (1954)
- Catherine Parr Traill (2003)
- Mary Travers (La Bolduc) (1994)
- Jennie Kidd Trout (1991)
- Pierre Elliott Trudeau (2001)
- Charles Tupper (1955)
- Joseph Burr Tyrrell (1989)

== V ==
- Georges Vanier (1967, 1977)
- Jon Vickers (2006)
- Queen Victoria (1867)
- Gilles Villeneuve (1997)

== W ==
- Angus Walters (1988)
- John Ware (cowboy) (2012)
- Robert Stanley Weir (1980)
- Percy Williams (1996)
- Healey Willan (1980)
- James Wolfe (1908)
- Fay Wray (2006)

== Y ==
- Marie-Marguerite d'Youville (1978)
