= Henri Julien =

Canadian artist and cartoonist (1852–1908)

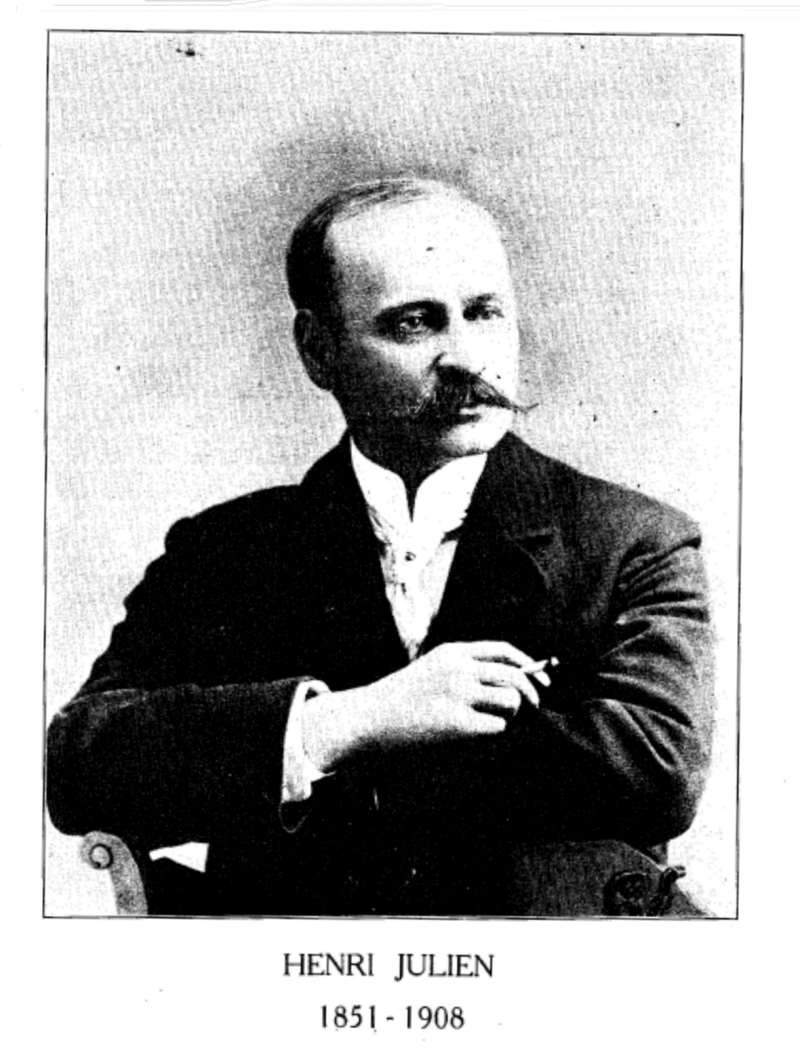
- Photo of Henri Julien
- Born: Octave-Henri Julien; 14 May 1852 Quebec City, Province of Canada
- Died: 17 September 1908 (aged 56) Montreal, Quebec, Canada
- Area: Cartoonist
- Pseudonyms: Octavo; Crincrin

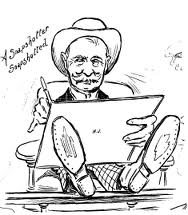
Self portrait

Henri Julien (baptized Octave-Henri Julien; 14 May 1852 – 17 September 1908) was a Canadian artist and cartoonist noted for his work for the Canadian Illustrated News and for his political cartoons in the Montreal Daily Star. His pseudonyms include Octavo and Crincrin. He was the first full-time newspaper editorial cartoonist in Canada.

== Personal history and career ==
Octave-Henri Julien was born in Quebec City on 14 May 1852 to Henri and Zoé Julien and grew up in the Saint-Roch neighbourhood. His father worked as a turner for a mechanical press and his brothers Émile and Télesphore also went on to work in printing. Early influences on Julien include caricatures by the sculptor Jean-Baptiste Côté, who lived nearby among the artisans of saint-Roche, and the country folk of nearby L'Ange-Gardien who inspired many of Julien's later drawings.

After the elder Julien won work with the Queen's printer George-Paschal Desbarats the family frequently moved as the capital of the Province of Canada moved: Toronto in 1855–59, Quebec City in 1859–65, and Ottawa in 1866–68, where he attended the College of Ottawa. He thereafter moved to Montreal where he apprenticed as an engraver at Leggo and Company, a partnership between William Leggo and George-Édouard Desbarats, where he met cartoonists such as Edward Jump who worked for Desbarats's illustrated magazines Canadian Illustrated News and L'Opinion publique.

Julien cartooned in Desbarats's employ until 1888; during this time he contributed to numerous other publications as well, including Le Canard and Le Violon published by Hector Berthelot, sometimes under pseudonyms such as Crincrin (in Le Violon from 1878 to 1903) and Octavo. His work included caricatures of politicians and illustrated journalism. In 1874 he accompanied George Arthur French and the North-West Mounted Police on an expedition to the fork of the Bow and Belly Rivers in Alberta; his drawings of the Canadian West appeared in the Canadian Illustrated News and L'Opinion publique in 1874–75, including a report on combatting contraband alcohol sales in Fort Whoop-Up.

Julien spent six months in New York in 1888; upon his return to Canada the same year he became artistic director at the Montreal Daily Star, which thus became the first Canadian newspaper to employ a full-time editorial cartoonist. Julien stayed with the paper for 22 years and built his reputation illustrating historical even and journalistic pieces, as well as drawing caricatures of members of Parliament in the House of Commons in Ottawa. He drew notice in 1897–1900 when he had published a number of caricatures of Wilfrid Laurier and his cabinet as blackface minstrels under the title "By-Town Coons". His best known work was of rural French Canadians which he started making about 1875 and continued for the rest of his life. From 1900 he took up painting, particularly commissions for scenes from French Canadian culture. His works appeared in exhibitions at the Royal Canadian Academy of Arts in 1899 and 1907 and at the Salon of the Art Association of Montreal in 1908.

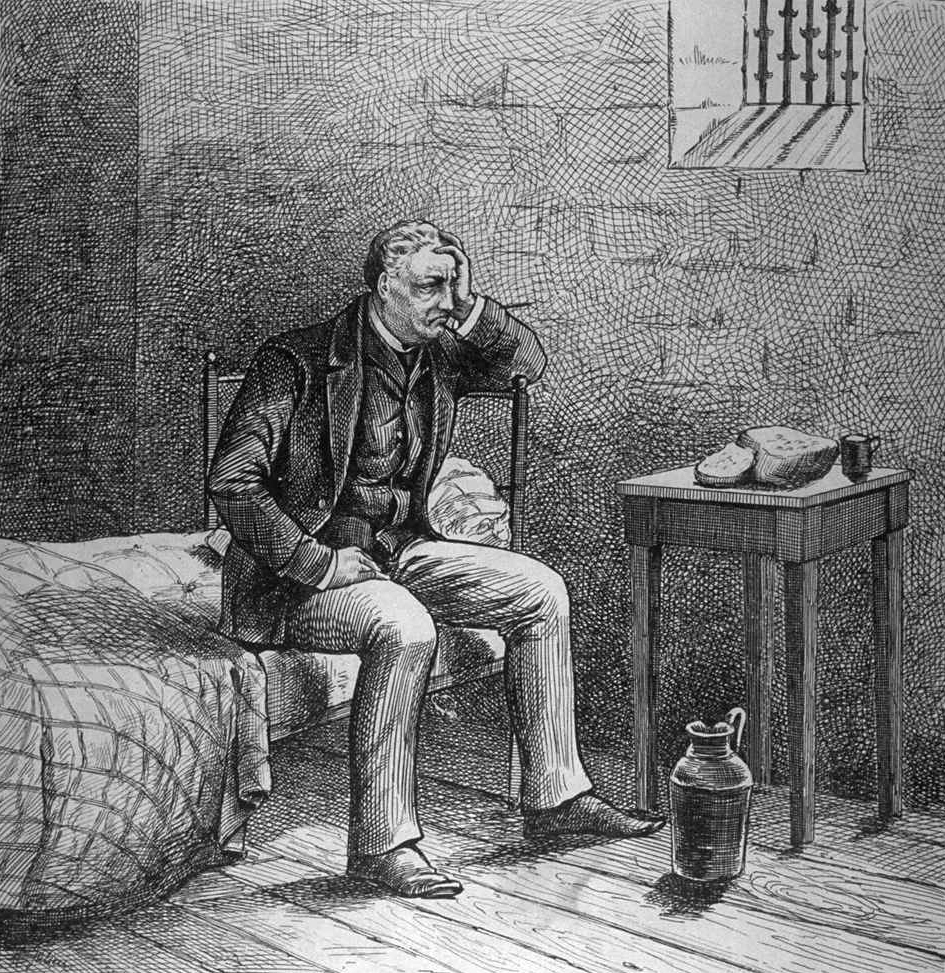
Le remède futur à la corruption électorale, 19 August 1875

Julien drew with speed and accuracy and attracted note for his skill at capturing expressions and gestures. He illustrated the annual L'Almanach du peuple and his work appeared in other Canadian publications such as John Wilson Bengough's Grip, Desbarats's Dominion Illustrated, Favourite, Jester, Canard, and Grelot, as well as foreign publications such as the American Harper's Weekly, the British The Graphic, and the French Le Monde illustré and L'Illustration.

Julien married Marie-Louise Legault dit Deslauriers (d. 1924) in Montreal on 17 October 1876; of the couple's eighteen children, seven daughters and one son survived into adulthood.

Julien died in Montreal on 17 September 1908. of a sudden stroke of apoplexy on St. James Street across from the St. Lawrence Hall. He had just left the Montreal Star in apparent good health with his son. At the time he was developing sketches for a parade to celebrate Quebec's 300th anniversary.

== Le Vieux de '37 ==
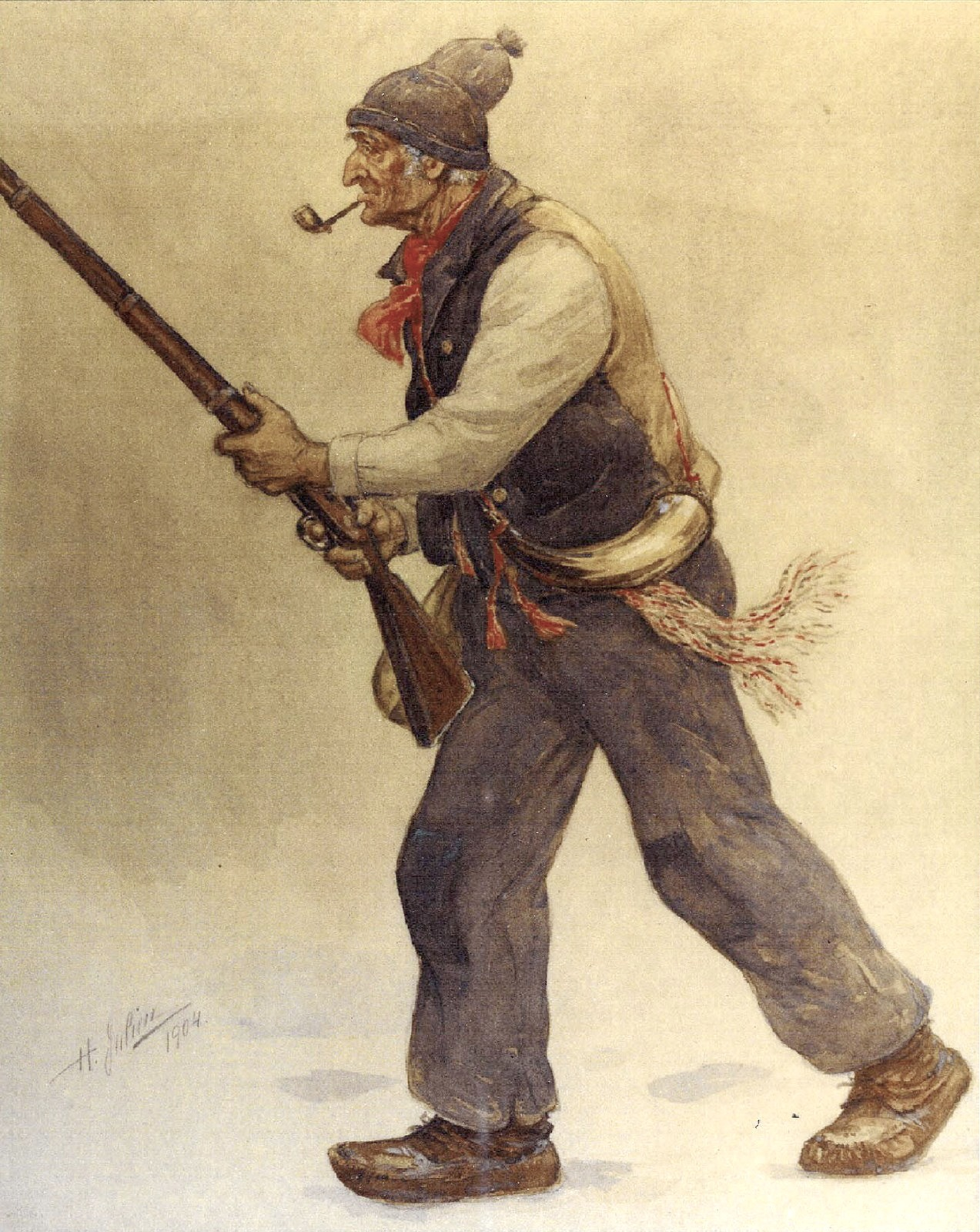
Le Vieux de '37 by Henri Julien

Le Vieux de '37 (French for "The Old Man of '37") is the name under which is known an illustration by Julien created in approximately 1880 to illustrate Le vieux patriote, a poem from Louis Fréchette.

It depicts a participant of the Lower Canada Rebellion of 1837 and 1838 which sought to make of Lower Canada (present-day Quebec) a democratic republic independent from the British Empire. It is nowadays one of the best known symbols of the Rebellion. It was used by the Front de libération du Québec as an illustration for pamphlets and communiqués during the 1960s and the year 1970. Some contemporary Patriote flags are flanked with them in their center.

== Legacy ==
The sculptor Louis-Philippe Hébert eulogized Julien as "the most original talent in this country". (Note: "le talent le plus original ... en ce pays") A posthumous collection of his cartoons appeared in the Album Henri Julien in 1916.

The architect William Sutherland Maxwell toured an exhibition of 125 unpublished works by Julien in 1936. The show visited Montreal, Toronto, Ottawa, and at the Musée national des beaux-arts du Québec in Quebec City. The National Gallery of Canada organized a retrospective of Julien's work in 1938, a unique event for a cartoonist in Canada.

A print by Henri Julien of the "Royal Military College of Canada Uniform of Cadets", which appeared in the Canadian Illustrated News is in the Canadian War Museum in Ottawa, Ontario. Accession Number: 19850291-004. The gallery L'Art français exhibited his works in 1968.

The Musée national des beaux-arts du Québec holds the most important collection of Julien's work, including La Chasse-galerie, Julien's best-known painting, inspired by a French-Canadian legend about a flying canoe.

== List of books ==
- Sous les pins (1902) – written by Adolphe Poisson with illustrations by Julien
- La légende d'un peuple (1908) – written by Louis-Honoré Fréchette with illustrations by Julien
- Album Henri Julien (1916)

== Gallery ==
Works by Henri Julien

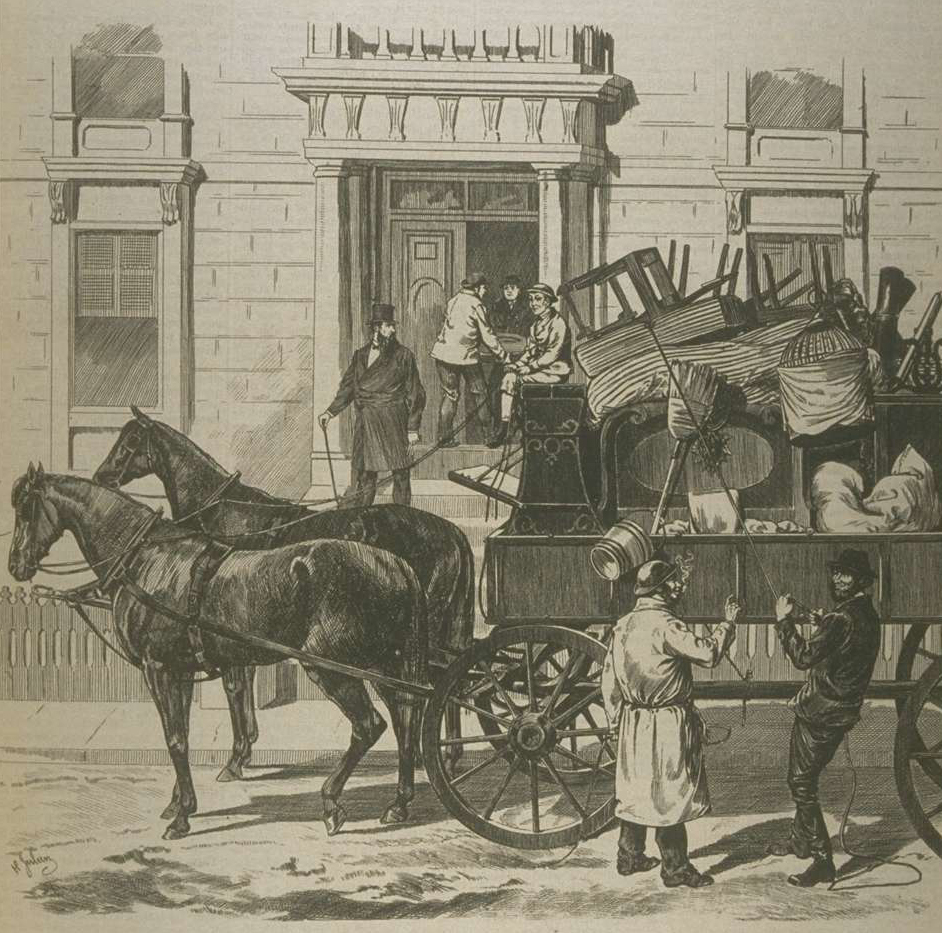
Moving scene, L'Opinion publique, 18 May 1876

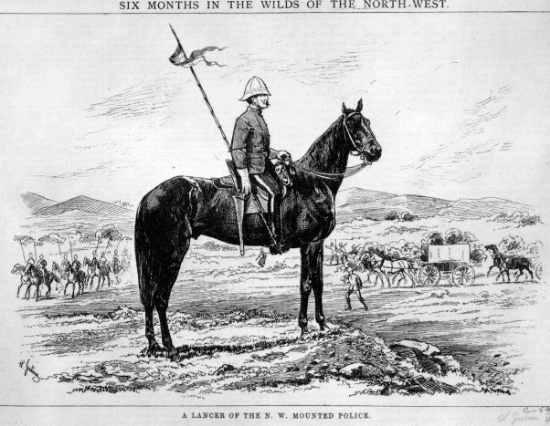
Six Months in the Wilds of the North-West, Canadian Illustrated News, 13 February 1875

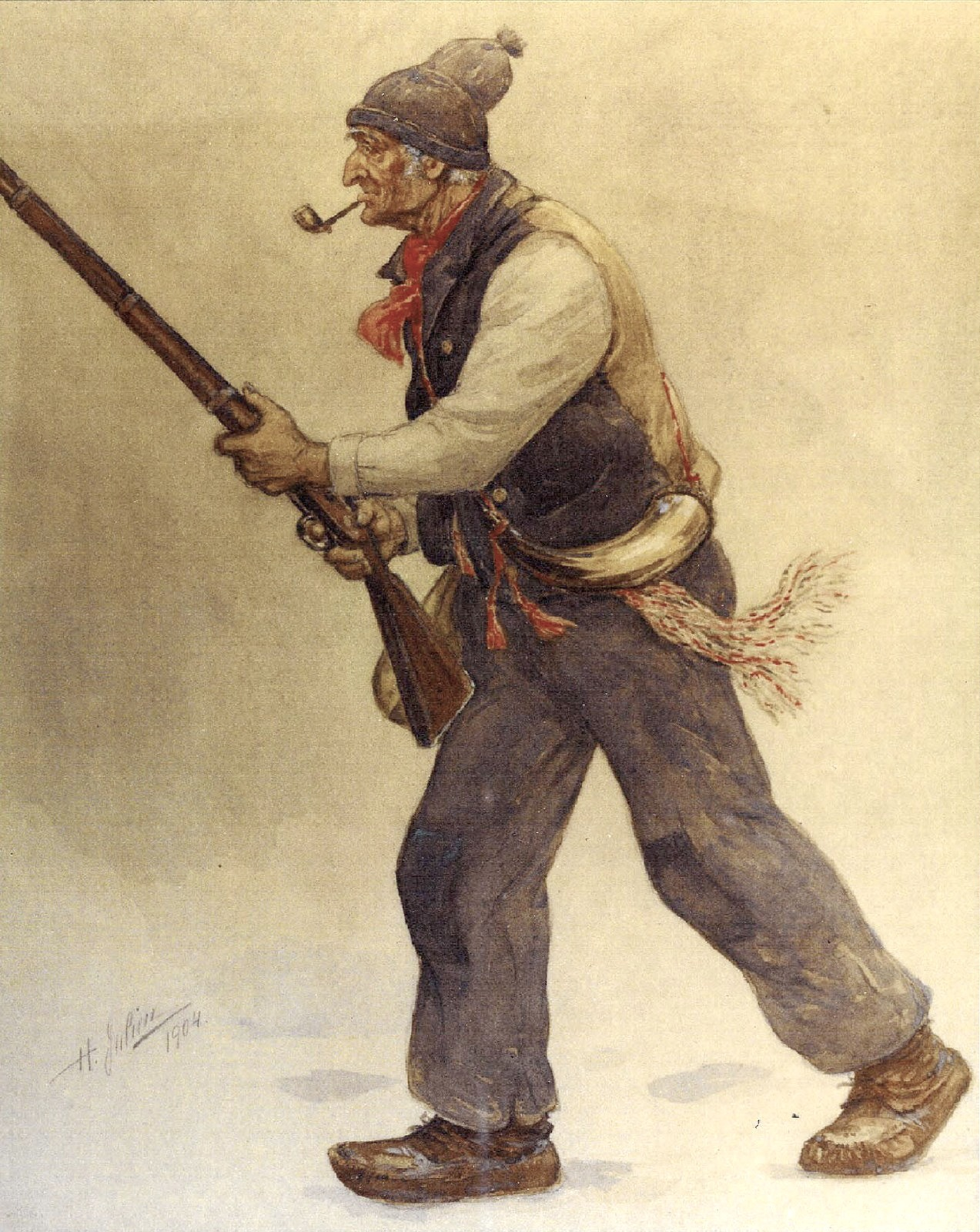
Le Patriote, gouache on brown paper, 1904

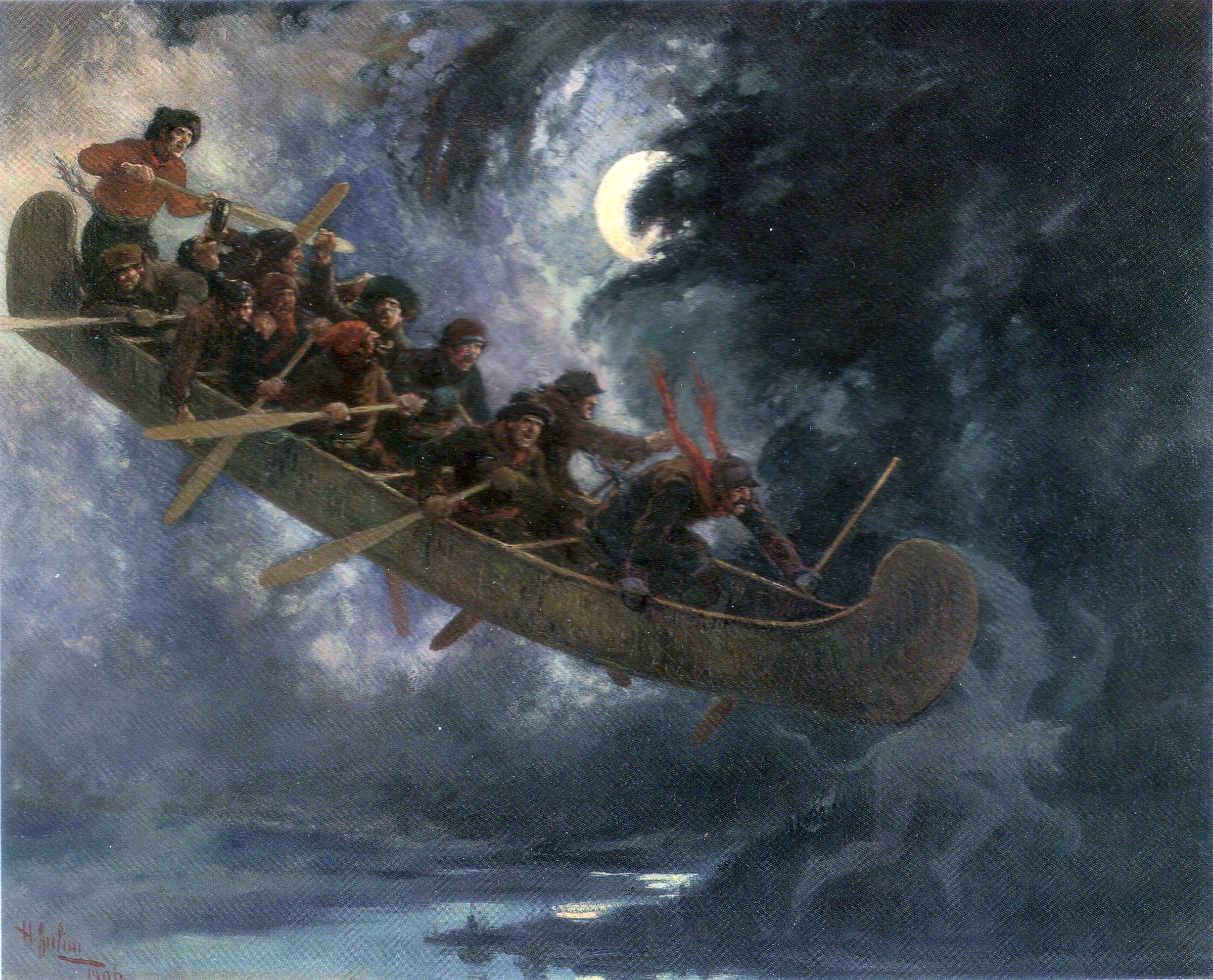
La Chasse-galerie, oil on canvas, 1906

== Works cited ==
- Guilbault, Nicole (1994). "Julien Henri". In Cook, Ramsay (ed.). Dictionary of Canadian Biography. Springer Science & Business Media. pp. 533–535. ISBN 978-0-8020-3998-9.
- Karel, David, ed. (1992). "Julien, Octave-Henri (Crincrin)". Dictionnaire des artistes de langue française en Amérique du Nord: peintres, sculpteurs, dessinateurs, graveurs, photographes, et orfèvres (in French). Presses Université Laval. p. 425. ISBN 978-2-7637-7235-6.
- Montreal Gazette staff (18 September 1908). "Henri Julien Dead". Montreal Gazette. p. 12.
- Spencer, David R. (2013). Drawing Borders: The American-Canadian Relationship during the Gilded Age. Bloomsbury Publishing. ISBN 978-1-4411-0912-5.
