= Élise L'Heureux =

Canadian photographer (1827–1896)

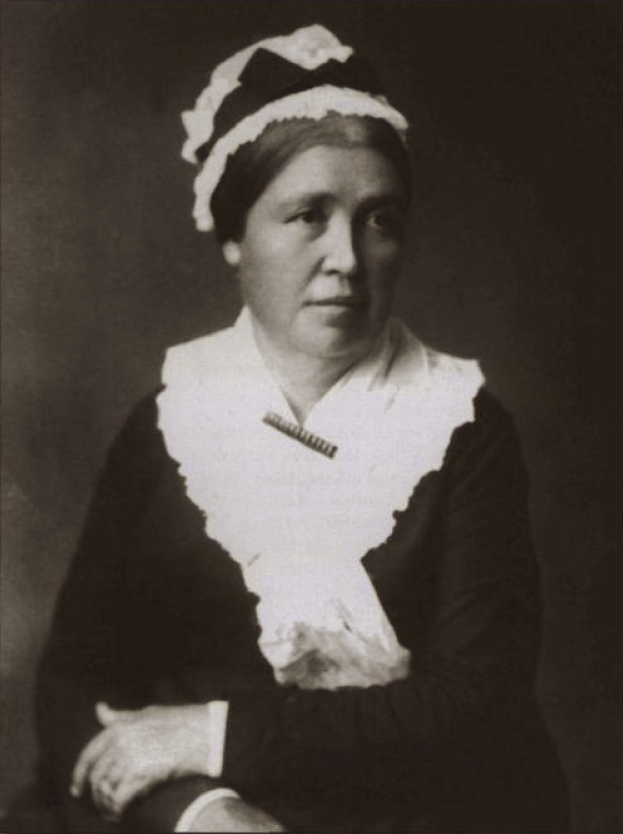
- Élise L'Heureux
- Born: January 27, 1827
- Died: January 1896 (aged 68–69); Quebec City, Canada
- Known for: Photography

Élise L'Heureux (born Élise L'Hérault; January 22, 1827 – January 1896) was a photographer from Quebec City, Quebec. Her initial artistic focus was on portraits, typically of children, for which she became known. She expanded to include cartes de visite and landscapes. L'Heureux contributed to documentary photography in the 19th century through her portraits of residents and landscapes of Quebec. She managed her own photography company after her husband died.

== Early life ==
Élise L'Heureux married Jules-Isaïe Benoît (dit Livernois) in 1849. The couple established their daguerreotype studio in 1854 in the home of L'Heureux's parents. This business later expanded to include three studios specializing in portraits. L'Heureux took over the business after her husband died of tuberculosis in 1865. A year later she partnered with her son-in-law Louis Bienvenu, creating the Livernois and Bienvenu photography studio.

Élise and Jules-Isaïe had six children – four daughters and two sons, including son Jules-Ernest (commonly known as Jules-Ernest Livernois), born on August 19, 1851, in Saint-Zéphirin-de-Courval, Quebec. He followed in his parents' footsteps, traveling throughout Quebec taking landscape photos and outdoor group portraits. In 1989, Jules-Ernest was one of four 19th-century Canadian photographers to be commemorated in the Canadian Photography series, marking the 150th anniversary of the first photograph taken in Canada, with a postage stamp issued by Canada Post.

== Career ==
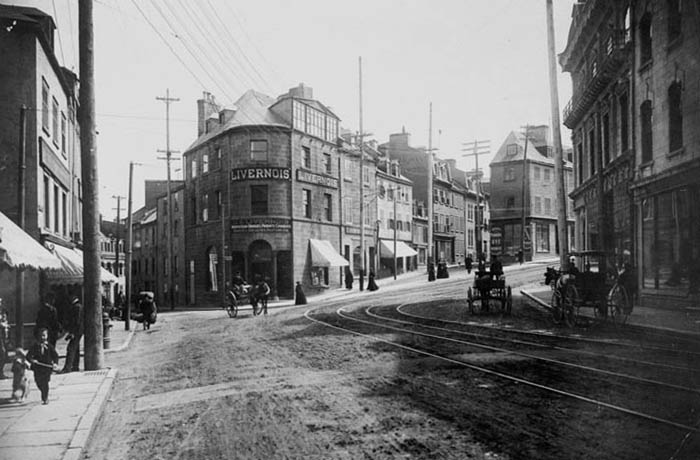
The Livernois studio in Quebec City

L'Heureux began her career in photography in 1856. She specialized in portraits of children from 1857 to 1858. The business expanded to include three studios. After she and Bienvenu entered into their partnership, the business expanded to include cartes de visite and landscapes in addition to portraits. Many of the studio's works are now owned by the Musée national des beaux-arts du Québec.

The studio had its works featured in L'Opinion publique and Canadian Illustrated News. The partnership with Bienvenu was dissolved in April 1873. Jules Livernois took over the studio until 1952. It went bankrupt in 1979.

== Photographic techniques ==
L'Heureux employed photographic techniques including daguerreotype and collodion, or "wet-plate", process and stereoscopy.

== Exhibitions ==
- L'Heureux's first exhibition was at the Nouvelle Galerie Historique in January 1866. A subsequent exhibition was held in July 1867 and featured a collection of portraits of celebrities.
- L'Heureux's work is on display at the Musée national des beaux-arts du Québec, the Bibliothèque et Archives nationales du Québec, Library and Archives Canada, and the Canadian Women Artists History Initiative Documentation Centre in Quebec.

== Death ==
L'Heureux died in Quebec City in January 1896.
