= Eight Stories Inside Quebec =

- Presented by: Peter Desbarats
- Country of origin: Canada
- Original language: English
- No. of seasons: 1
- No. of episodes: 8

Production
- Executive producer: Paul Wright
- Production locations: Montreal; London
- Running time: 30 minutes

Original release
- Network: CBC Television
- Release: 20 July – 7 September 1966

Related
- More Stories From Inside Quebec

Eight Stories Inside Quebec is a Canadian documentary television miniseries that aired on CBC Television in 1966.

== Premise ==
This series of eight documentaries concerned Quebec life and culture, presented for an English-Canadian audience, hosted by Peter Desbarats who later hosted La Difference.

== Production ==
CBC Montreal produced all episodes except "What Went Wrong with Belgium?" which was produced out of CBC's London bureau in conjunction with Aujourd'hui, a French-language series.

== Scheduling ==
This half-hour series was broadcast Wednesdays at 10:30 p.m. (Eastern) from 20 July to 7 September 1966.

== Episodes ==
1. 20 July 1966: "Jean-Paul Desbiens" (Arnold Gelbart director; Howard Ryshpan writer)
2. 27 July 1966: "This Blooming Business of Bilingualism" (Peter Pearson director)
3. 3 August 1966: "Between Two Worlds" (Felix Lazarus director; C. J. Newman writer), regarding the Jewish community in Montreal
4. 10 August 1966: "Where are the English of Yesteryear?", exploring the decline of Quebec City's English population through the eyes of a young girl from London, England
5. 17 August 1966: "Confederation of Two, directed by Dennis Miller director; Marion Andre Czerniecki story editor), about three mixed-language couples
6. 24 August 1966: "The Ballad of Louis Cyr (Arnold Gelbart director; Sidetracks musical score)
7. 31 August 1966: "What Went Wrong with Belgium?" (Dennis Miller director)
8. 7 September 1966: "What's the Matter With Old McGill?" (Dennis Miller director; Richard Gwyn and Sandra Gwyn writers)
