= Coat of arms of Ottawa =

Canadian municipal symbol

- Armiger: Ottawa
- Adopted: 1954 (College of Arms), reissued 2001 (CHA)
- Crest: A white pine fructed proper charged with a bezant thereon an oak tree eradicated and fructed proper
- Torse: Argent and azure
- Helmet: A gentleman's helm mantled azure doubled argent
- Shield: Argent a cross wavy Azure charged with a like cross Argent between in the first quarter the Royal Crown proper and in the fourth quarter a maple leaf Gules on a chief also Gules an astrolabe Argent between to the dexter two arrows in saltire points upwards Argent surmounted by an Indian canoe paddle erect Or and to the sinister a spade and pick axe in saltire Argent surmounted by a grenade Or fired proper
- Supporters: Dexter a timber trimmer of the date 1850 holding in the exterior hand a trimming axe head downwards and on the sinister an officer of the Civil Service Rifle Regiment all proper
- Compartment: A grassy mound strewn with white pine cones
- Motto: ADVANCE OTTAWA EN AVANT
- Use: Stationery, chain of office, some proclamations, seals, certificates, invitations, souvenirs, gifts

The coat of arms of Ottawa was presented to the municipality of Ottawa by Vincent Massey on 20 October 1954.

== History ==
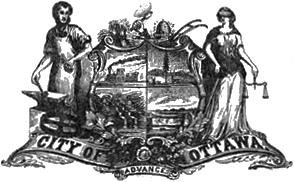
Historical coat of arms designed by John Henry Walker

Engraver John Henry Walker designed an original coat of arms for Bytown and later one for the City of Ottawa in the 1850s.

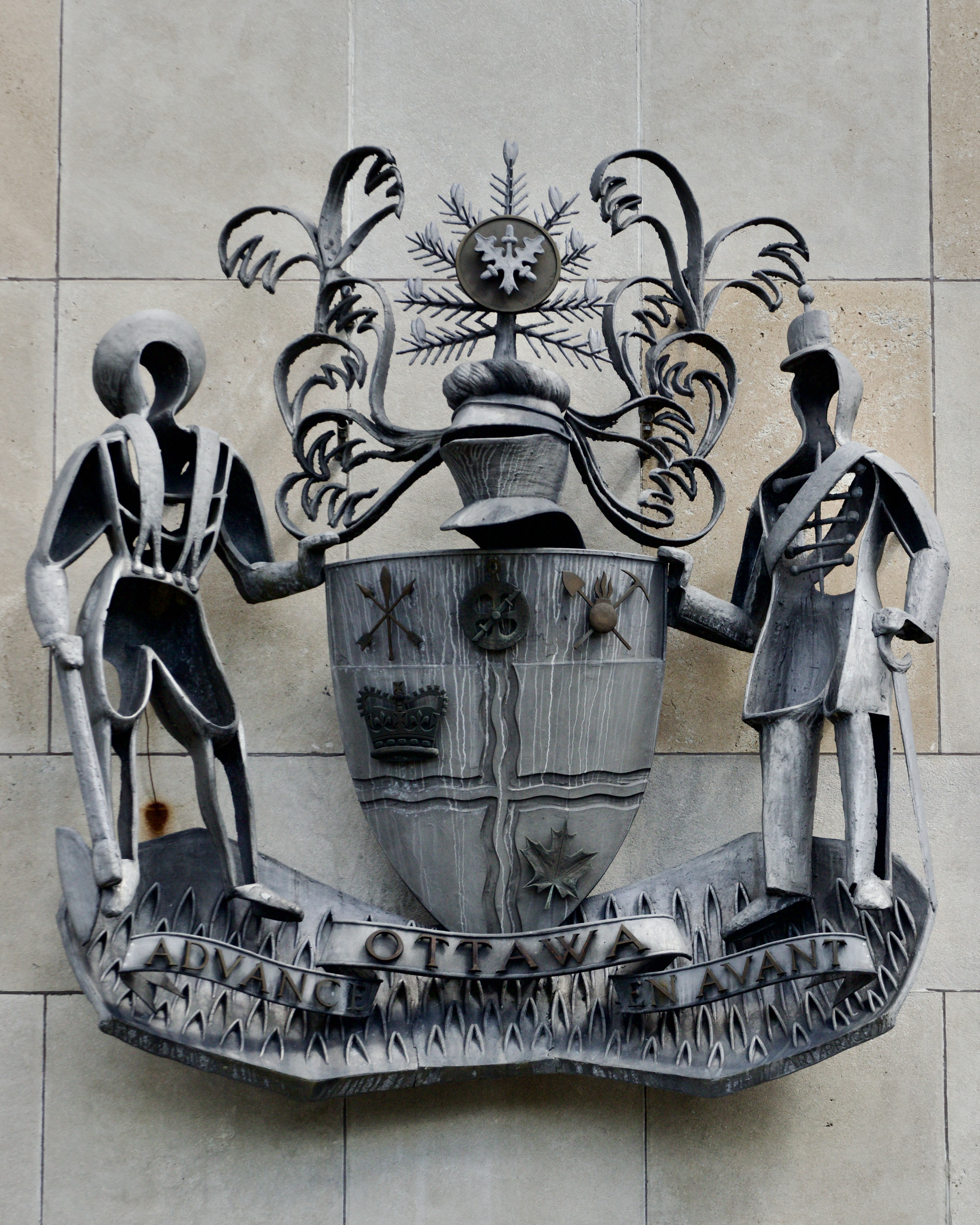
Displayed at the entrance of the Diefenbaker Building

In 1954, the Duke of Norfolk, acting in his capacity as Earl Marshal, issued letters patent granting arms to the city of Ottawa. The city formally declared the use of the arms in force as of 1 January of the following year.

Upon amalgamation of the city of Ottawa with surrounding municipalities in 2001, the new City Council requested that the arms be reissued to the newly formed municipality. In March of that year, the Canadian Heraldic Authority issued a new grant of arms. The new arms are exactly the same as the old.

== Symbolism ==
Crest

The white pine is the historical basis of the economic power of the Ottawa Valley, while the small badge on the tree refers to Bytown, the town that later became the city of Ottawa.

Shield

The main element of the shield, the wavy blue and white lines, represent the Ottawa River running from left to right with the Rideau and Gatineau rivers represented above and below. A royal crown alludes to Queen Victoria's choice of Ottawa as Canada's capital, while the maple leaf is the national emblem of Canada. At the top of the shield, the arrows and paddle are representative of the first inhabitants of the region, while the astrolabe in the centre alludes to Samuel de Champlain who was first to discover Quebec, today known as part of Canada, and also explore the Ottawa river, and the remaining tools to John By, builder of the Rideau Canal.

Compartment

Again referring to the history of the Ottawa Valley.

Supporters

The timber trimmer again represents the historical economic strength of the Ottawa Valley, while the officer of the Civil Service Rifle Regiment alludes to Ottawa's place as the centre of government—the civil service—of Canada.

Motto

Adapted from the motto of the pre-amalgamation city of Ottawa, "City of Ottawa Advance"

== See also ==
- Canadian heraldry
- National symbols of Canada
- List of Canadian provincial and territorial symbols
- Heraldry
