= L'Opinion publique =

French-Canadian weekly newspaper

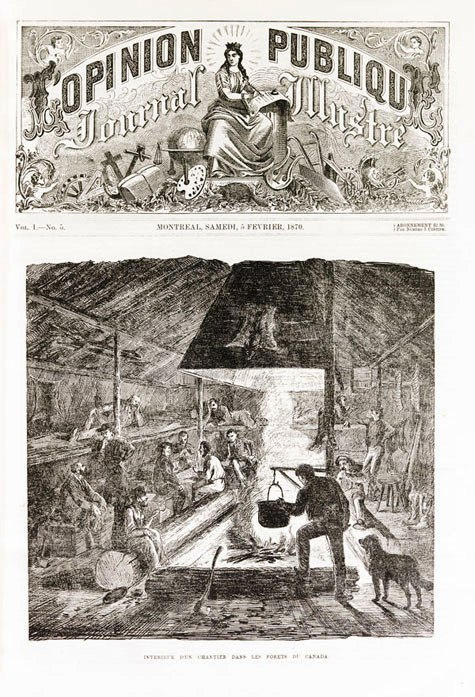
February 5, 1870 : Interior of a work site in the forests of Canada

L'Opinion publique was a weekly illustrated magazine published in Montreal from 1870 to 1883 by George-Édouard Desbarats. It is considered to be the first French-language illustrated newspaper in Canada.

== History ==
L'Opinion publique was founded in Montreal by George-Édouard Desbarats, Laurent-Olivier David, and Joseph-Alfred Mousseau. It was originally intended to be non-partisan, but nonetheless defend the rights of francophones.

The first issue was published on January 1, 1870. At first it was published weekly on Saturdays, but from April 28, 1870, it published on Thursdays. L'Opinion publique was the French-language counterpart to Canadian Illustrated News, also produced by George-Édouard Desbarats in Montreal. For these two publications, he collaborated with William Leggo, inventor of "leggotype", a technique that allows halftone printing from a photograph; Leggo and Desbarats held the patent jointly. The Canadian Illustrated News had the reputation for being the first magazine in the world that could make, week after week, good reproductions of photographs; the first print it published using this technique, of Prince Arthur, attracted considerable attention when it was published in the October 30, 1869 edition of the magazine. This technology met the needs of Desbarats, who advocated that images are "the most direct and most sure way to reach the mind." Despite the similarities of the two journals - some illustrations and sometimes the same content from the Canadian Illustrated News were reused in L'Opinion publique - the two weeklies were independent and the journalists and collaborators were different.

During the first years of its activity, the newspaper, under the direction of Laurent-Olivier David, had nationalist and liberal tendencies, which went against the original intention to be neutral. He thus left the paper at the end of 1873 to eliminate the idea that the paper was taking a political position. Oscar Dunn then replaced Joseph-Alfred Mousseau.

In 1875, because of financial problems and for the sake of retaining its readership, L'Opinion publique essentially became a cultural magazine. Even though political subjects were no longer frequently discussed, collaborations with Henri-Raymond Casgrain, Joseph Tassé, Benjamin Sulte, and Louis Fréchette, and above all Henri Julien's drawings continued to attract readers.

From 1870 to 1874, the magazine had a French-language American edition through the acquisition of L'Étendard national, a newspaper founded in 1969 in Worcester, Massachusetts by Ferdinand Gagnon, who continued to contribute to it.

The last edition of the journal was issued on December 29, 1883. L'Opinion publique, like the Canadian Illustrated News, ceased publication at the end of 1883, but in many ways prefigured the press of the 20th century.

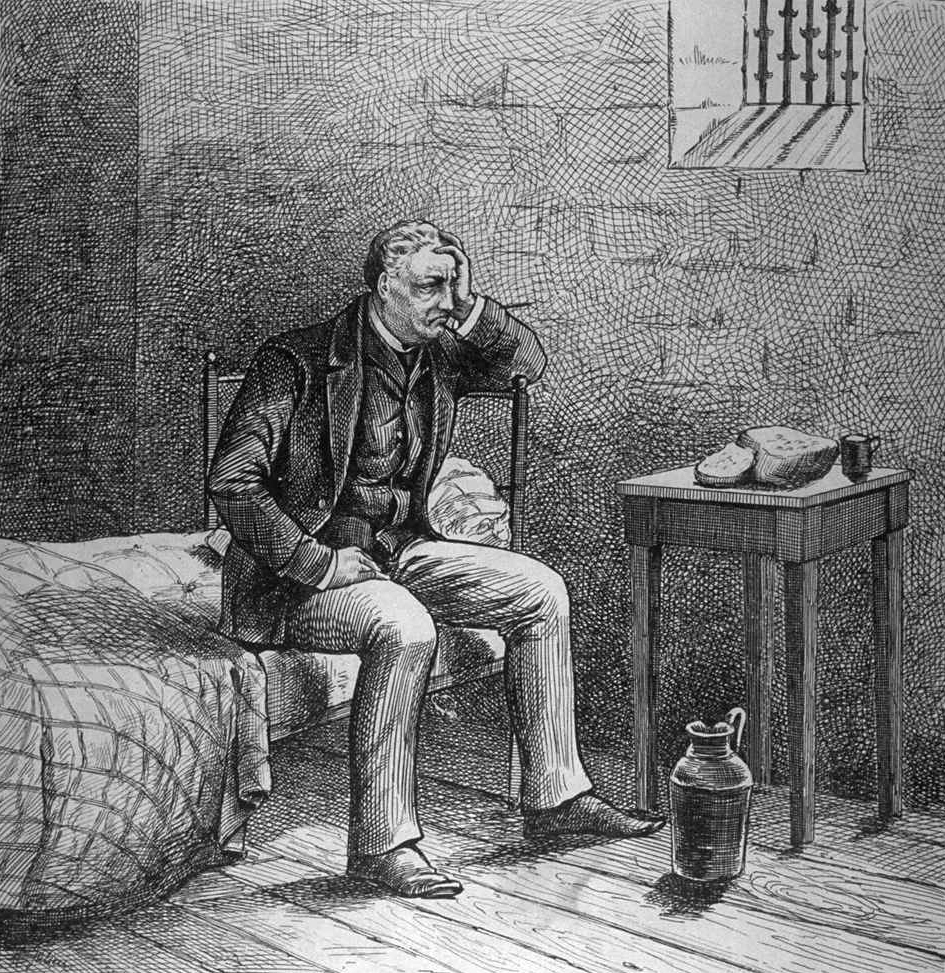
Le remède futur à la corruption électorale ("The future remedy for electoral corruption") by Henri Julien, engraving published in L'Opinion publique, August 19, 1875

== Collaborators ==
- Joseph-Alfred Mousseau
- Laurent-Olivier David
- Oscar Dunn, editor-in-chief
- Henri Julien, illustrator
- Napoléon Legendre, columnist
- Joseph Tassé
- Benjamin Sulte
- Louis Fréchette
- John Henry Walker, engraver

== See also ==
- Canadian Illustrated News

== Bibliography ==
- Beaulieu, André; Hamelin, Jean (1975). La presse québécoise des origines à nos jours. Québec: Presses de l'Université Laval. pp. 145–150. ISBN 0774667710.
- Chassay, Jean-François (1984). "Notre première revue : l'Opinion publique (1870-1883)". Voix et Images (in French). 9 (2): 131–142. doi:10.7202/200444ar. ISSN 0318-9201.
