= John Cook (Canadian minister) =

Church minister and educator

The Reverend John Cook
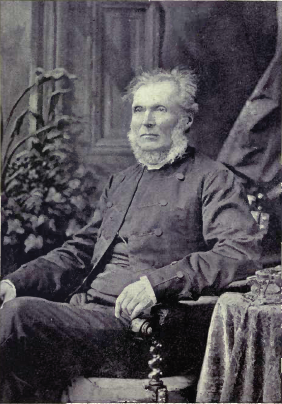

Principal of Queen's College at Kingston
- In office 1857–1859
- Preceded by: James George acting
- Succeeded by: William Leitch

Chancellor of Queen's College at Kingston
- In office 1877–1879
- Succeeded by: Sandford Fleming

Personal details
- Born: 13 April 1805 Sanquhar, Scotland
- Died: 31 March 1892 (aged 86) unknown
- Education: University of Glasgow; University of Edinburgh

John Cook (13 April 1805 – 31 March 1892) was a minister at a Presbyterian Church in Canada and educator associated with Quebec.

== Early life and education ==
He was born in Sanquhar, Scotland, and educated at University of Glasgow and University of Edinburgh. He served as a minister in the Church of Scotland, and was ordained in December 1835 in Cardross, and designated minister of St. Andrew's Presbyterian Church, Quebec City (under the Colonial Committee) and arrived in Canada East in April 1836.

== Career ==
He was Minister of St Andrew's Church from 1836 to 1883, and was the first Moderator of the General Assembly of the Presbyterian Church in Canada in June 1875. He had also served as Moderator of the Church of Scotland's Canada Synod in 1838, not long after his arrival. Despite being under the tutelage of Free Church leader Professor Thomas Chalmers at Edinburgh, Cook remained with the Established Church in June 1844. He was asked to moderate the remainder of that Synod meeting in Kingston, following the defection of Moderator Mark Young Stark.

Cook also promoted education, started schools, and was associated with the early days of both Queen's College at Kingston, Canada West and McGill University. He was principal of Morrin College in Quebec City for 31 of its 40 years.

== Honors and awareds ==
In June 1975, Canada Post honoured the Centenary of the Presbyterian Church in Canada with the issue of a postage stamp in honour of Cook. He was awarded the Doctor of Divinity in 1838 from the University of Glasgow, and the LLD from Queen's in 1880, following his term as Chancellor.

Academic offices
Preceded by James George, acting	Principal of Queen's College at Kingston; 1857–1859	Succeeded by William Leitch
Preceded by New position	Chancellor of Queen's College at Kingston; 1877–1879	Succeeded by Sandford Fleming
