= Ellen Kyle Noel =

Irish Canadian writer

Ellen Kyle Vavasaur Noel
- Born: Ellen Kyle; 22 December 1815; Ireland
- Died: 20 June 1873; Kingston, Ontario

Ellen Kyle Noel pseud. Mrs. J.V. Noel. (22 December 1815 – 20 June 1873), was an Irish Canadian writer who published a number of novels through journals and serialization.

== Early life and education ==
Born Ellen Kyle in 1815 to Christopher Kyle and an Anglican family in Ireland. Noel emigrated to Ontario, Canada, settling in Kingston where she met John le Vavasour Noel and they married in 1833. Noel ran a seminary for women in Savannah, Georgia, in the United States from about 1836 to 1847. While in the US the family name changed slightly to Vavasour. The couple returned to Kingston in 1847. They had seven children, one of whom, also Ellen, was also a writer. Noel wrote stories and serialized novels in periodicals based in Montreal and Toronto using the name Mrs JV Noel. Her work appeared in the Canadian Illustrated News and the Saturday Reader. Noel died of liver cancer in 1873.

== Bibliography ==
- The Abbey of Rathmore, and Other Tales
- The Cross of Pride
- Hilda
- Passion and Principle
