= La Difference =

- Genre: Current affairs
- Presented by: Peter Desbarats; Richard Gwyn
- Country of origin: Canada
- Original language: English
- No. of seasons: 1
- No. of episodes: 8

Production
- Executive producer: Paul Wright
- Producer: Milo Chvostek
- Production location: Montreal
- Running time: 30 minutes

Original release
- Network: CBC Television
- Release: 18 July – 19 September 1968

La Difference is a Canadian current affairs television miniseries that aired on CBC Television in 1968.

== Premise ==
This series, hosted by Peter Desbarats and Richard Gwyn, concerned cultural differences between English and French Canada, providing historical context for these distinctions. The production noted that history could be used to promote certain goals depending on its interpretation.

== Scheduling ==
This half-hour series was broadcast Thursdays at 9:30 p.m. (Eastern) from 18 July to 19 September 1968.

== Episodes ==
1. "The Conquest" examined the Battle of the Plains of Abraham and its role in shaping modern conflict between English and French in Canada; Gwyn interviewed Françoise Loranger, author of Le chemin du roy which satirized Charles de Gaulle's controversial 1967 "Vive le Québec libre" statement
2. "Confederation: The Politics of Survival" portrayed two debates, one at the time of Canadian Confederation as re-enacted by actors, and another contemporary debate concerning the Canadian constitution featuring Quebec provincial legislative members Pierre Laporte and Marcel Masse, and Ontario provincial members Bert Lawrence and Tim Reid
3. "How the West Was Lost" considered the situation in western Canada, noting Manitoba's inclusion into Canadian Confederation, and the uprisings of Louis Riel
4. "St. George and the Lily", concerning how French Canadians view the Canadian Forces
5. "You're a Good Man, Charles de Gaulle", focusing on de Gaulle's visit to Canada in 1967
6. "How Do You Say 'Hot Dog' In Quebec?", concerning American cultural effects on Quebec
7. "Patriots or Traitors", featuring the dilemma of Prime Minister Wilfrid Laurier as a francophone in a Canadian institution
8. "La Difference", a conclusion of the series, concerned with the academic work in developing English and French Canadian history
