= James George (academic) =

Canadian academic

Principal of Queen's College at Kingston
- In office 1853–1857
- Preceded by: John Machar
- Succeeded by: John Cook

Personal details
- Born: November 8, 1800 unknown
- Died: August 26, 1870 (aged 69) Stratford, Ontario

James George (November 8, 1800 – August 26, 1870) was the acting Principal of Queen's University from 1853 to 1857. He oversaw the establishment of the School of Medicine and the expansion of the Faculty of Arts.

In 1854, George helped to bring the Reverend George Weir over from Scotland as a professor of classical literature. Relations between the two were amiable until Weir accused George of fathering his sister's illegitimate child. George stepped down amidst the scandal, but the matter was never fully investigated and he kept his post as the professor of moral philosophy. In frustration, Weir penned a 16 canto epic poem mocking the former principal.

After several years of continued accusations from Weir, George retired to a ministry in Stratford, Ontario, where he spent the remainder of his days. The charges against him were never proven one way or the other.

Academic offices
Preceded by John Machar	Principal of Queen's College at Kingston; 1853–1857	Succeeded by John Cook
