= Battle of Fort Frontenac =

Battle of the French and Indian War

- Part of the Seven Years' War; French and Indian War
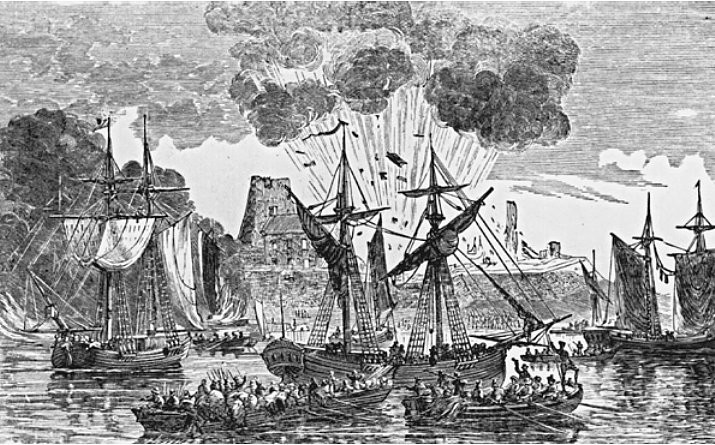
- Depiction of the battle by John Henry Walker
Date	August 26–28, 1758
Location	present-day Kingston, Ontario 44°14′00″N 76°28′43″W
Result	British victory

Belligerents
Great Britain: British America	France: (New France) Colony of Canada

Commanders and leaders
John Bradstreet	(Kingdom of France) Pierre-Jacques Payen de Noyan et de Chavoy (POW)

Strength
2,635: 2,500 militia and Indians; 135 regulars	110 regulars 2 armed vessels

Casualties and losses
11 wounded	2 killed All surrendered 2 ships captured

The Battle of Fort Frontenac took place on August 26–28, 1758 during the Seven Years' War (referred to as the French and Indian War in the United States) between France and Great Britain. The location of the battle was Fort Frontenac, a French fort and trading post which is located at the site of present-day Kingston, Ontario, at the eastern end of Lake Ontario where it drains into the St. Lawrence River.

British Lieutenant Colonel John Bradstreet led an army of over 3,000 men, of whom about 150 were regulars and the remainder were provincial militia. The army besieged the 110 people inside the fort and won their surrender two days later, cutting one of the two major communication and supply lines between the major eastern centres of Montreal and Quebec City and France's western territories (the northern route, along the Ottawa River, remained open throughout the war). The British captured goods worth 800,000 livres from the trading post.

== Background ==
The British military campaigns for the North American theatre of the Seven Years' War in 1758 contained three primary objectives. Two of these objectives, captures of Fort Louisbourg and Fort Duquesne met with success. The third campaign, an expedition involving 16,000 men under the command of General James Abercrombie, was disastrously defeated on July 8, 1758, by a much smaller French force when it attempted the capture of Fort Carillon (known today as Fort Ticonderoga). This defeat was an impetus to attack Fort Frontenac.

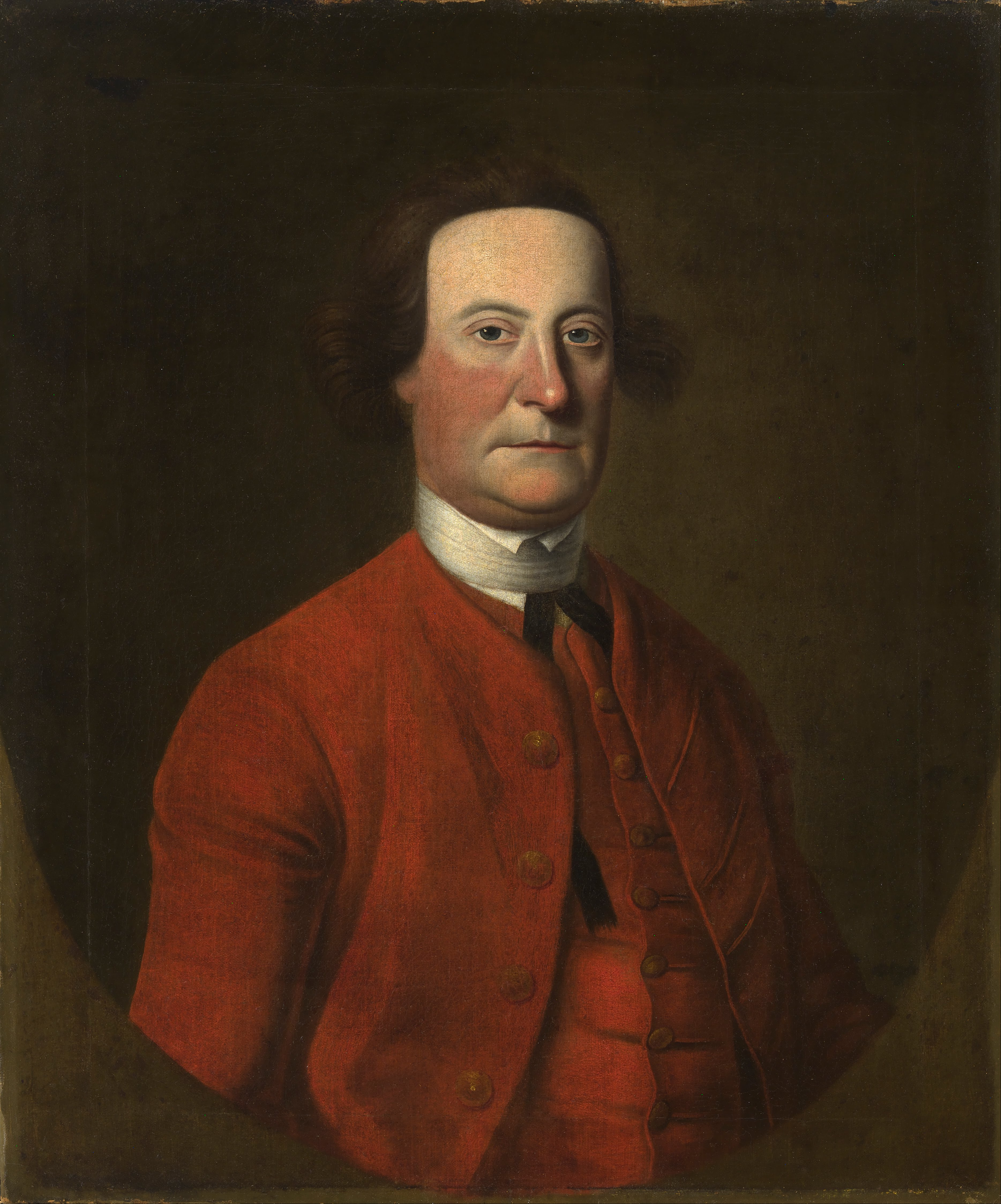
John Bradstreet

Lieutenant Colonel John Bradstreet renewed an earlier proposal to capture Fort Frontenac, a French fort and trading post on the northern shore of Lake Ontario near where it empties into the St. Lawrence River. Abercrombie, who had first rejected the idea, citing the need for troops to attack Carillon, approved Bradstreet's plan to move up the Mohawk River valley to the site of Fort Oswego (captured and burned by the French in 1756), and then cross the lake to assault Frontenac. The British considered Fort Frontenac to be a strategic threat since it was in a position to command transportation and communications to other French fortifications and outposts along the St. Lawrence – Great Lakes water route and in the Ohio Valley. Although not as important as it once was, the fort was still a base from which the western outposts were supplied. The British reasoned that if they were to disable the fort, supplies would be cut off and the outposts would no longer be able to defend themselves. The British also hoped that taking the well-known fort would boost troop morale and honour after their demoralizing battle defeat at Fort Ticonderoga (Fort Carillon) in July 1758. The Indian trade in the upper country (the Pays d'en Haut) would also be disrupted.

Fort Frontenac was an important trading center for Indian and French fur traders and was regarded as a threat to Fort Oswego, which was built by the British across the lake from Fort Frontenac in 1722 to compete with Fort Frontenac for the Indian trade, and later enhanced as a military establishment. General Montcalm had already used Fort Frontenac as a staging point to attack the fortifications at Oswego in August 1756. Trade through Fort Frontenac was so successful that some Indians preferred to trade with the French at the fort rather than the British outpost at Albany, New York, which provided more ready access to inexpensive British goods.

The fort was a crumbling limestone construction that was only minimally garrisoned with about 100 French troops along with some militia and Indians under the command of Pierre-Jacques Payen de Noyan et de Chavoy, an elderly veteran of King George's War. While the fort was normally garrisoned by a larger force, the limited means available for the defense of New France had forced French military leaders to reduce its size for the defense of other parts of Canada. Noyan was alerted to the expedition's advance when Indian scouts took some prisoners, and authorities in Montreal organized reinforcements. However, these forces would not arrive before the British.

Bradstreet assembled an army at Schenectady consisting of just 135 regular army troops and about 3,500 militia, drawn from the provinces of New York, Massachusetts, New Jersey, and Rhode Island. By the time his army reached the ruins of Fort Oswego on August 21, Bradstreet had lost 600 men, primarily to desertion. The trek met with minimal opposition from French and Indian raiding parties, but the route to Oswego, which had been virtually unused since 1756, was overgrown, and some of the waterways had silted up, causing heavily laden bateaux to ground in the shallow waters. Bradstreet's flotilla of bateaux crossed Lake Ontario, landing without opposition about one mile (1.6 km) from Fort Frontenac on August 25.

== Battle ==
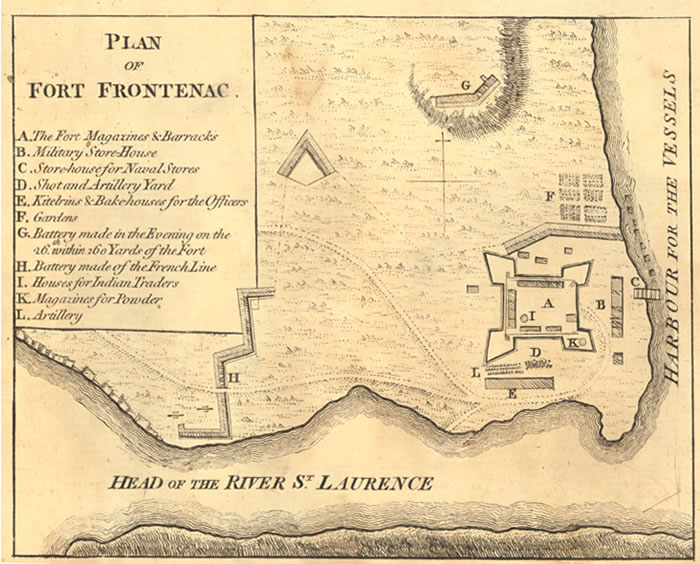
A 1763 map showing the British positions

The night after landing, Bradstreet's men established gun batteries and began to dig trenches toward the old fort. They also attempted, without success to board two of the French ships anchored before the fort. On the morning of August 26, the British guns opened fire. The French garrison returned fire with cannons and muskets, but made little impression on the British. The two sides continued to exchange fire on the 27th, with the British establishing gun batteries northwest of the fort, about 200 yards (180 m) from the fort. On the morning of the 28th, two French ships attempted to escape the harbor, but ran aground after persistent British fire against them. Following a brief council of war, Noyan raised the white flag.

== Aftermath ==
With the capture of Frontenac, the British intercepted significant supplies destined for French forts in the Ohio Country. More than 60 cannons (some of them British cannons the French had captured at Fort Oswego) were found, as were hundreds of barrels of provisions. To the many provincials in Bradstreet's army, the biggest prizes were bales of furs destined for shipment downstream to Montreal. In all, the value of the captured goods was estimated to be 800,000 French livres. Since Bradstreet's orders were not to hold the fort but to destroy it, many of the provisions were burned before the army returned to Oswego, using some of the captured French ships to help carry the loot. Bradstreet released the French prisoners after Noyan promised to gain the release of an equal number of British prisoners, and the French began to make their way back to Montreal. They were met by the relief force from Montreal. The French established Fort de La Présentation (at present-day Ogdensburg, New York) as a base for supply and defense. Fort Frontenac was again lightly garrisoned in 1759, but was no longer a site of importance in the war, which ended with the fall of Montreal in September 1760.

New France's governor, the Marquis de Vaudreuil, took full responsibility for the French loss, as he had believed that the British "would not dare to enter Lake Ontario on which [the French] had vessels." He did however force Noyan into retirement. Noyan returned to France, where he spent some time in the Bastille on charges that he misappropriated public funds, and was eventually fined six livres.
