= St. Andrew's Church (Quebec City) =

Presbyterian church in Quebec City, Quebec, Canada

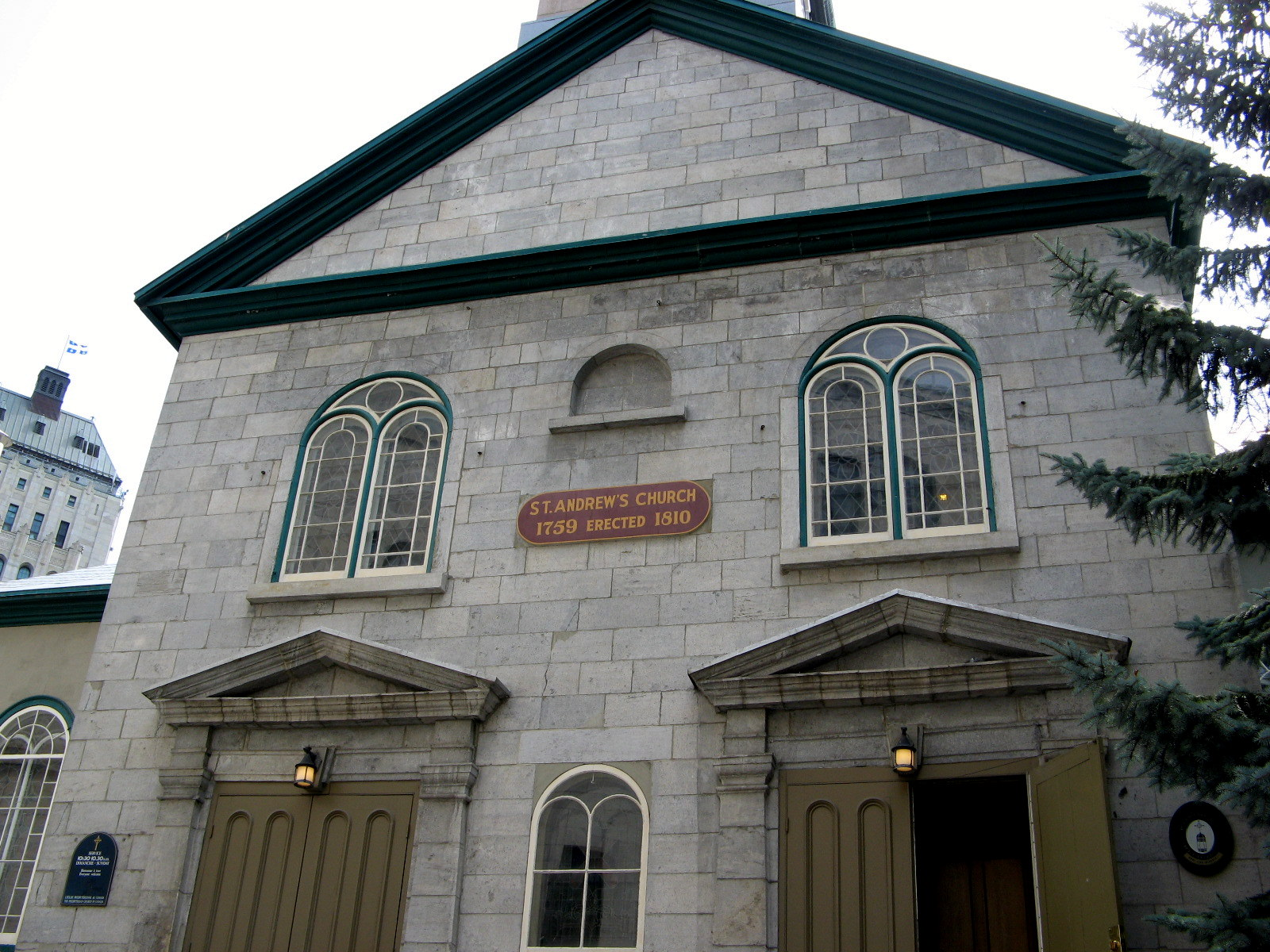
- St. Andrew's Presbyterian Church on rue Sainte-Anne in the Upper Town of Old Quebec.

- Location of St. Andrew's Church in Quebec City
- 46°48′46.67″N 71°12′34.78″W
- Location: Quebec City, Quebec
- Country: Canada
- Denomination: Presbyterian
- Website: standrewsquebeccity.sitew.ca

History
- Status: Church
- Founded: 1759; 267 years ago
- Founder: Rev. Robert MacPherson
- Dedication: Andrew the Apostle
- Dedicated: 30 November 1810

Architecture
- Functional status: Active
- Architect: John Bryson
- Groundbreaking: 1809
- Completed: 1810
- Construction cost: £1,500

Specifications
- Capacity: 600

St. Andrew's Presbyterian Church (French: Église presbytérienne Saint Andrew) is a Presbyterian church congregation located in Quebec City, Quebec, Canada. It belongs to the Presbyterian Church in Canada denomination.

== History ==
The congregation's roots began with the British conquest of Quebec at the Plains of Abraham in 1759. Under the leadership of Church of Scotland Chaplain Robert MacPherson and soldiers of the famous 78th Fraser Highlanders of James Wolfe's Army in 1759. A congregation evolved under his leadership, until his death in 1765. He was succeeded by another former Chaplain, George Henry.

With the 1763 Treaty, and the coming of merchants from Scotland and New England, the congregation soon assumed civilian status and was known as the Scotch Congregation - in connection with the Church of Scotland.

During the 1802 ministry of Alexander Spark, in response to a petition signed by 148 persons, the present Church site was granted by His Majesty George III, although it was not until 1807 that construction began.

The long-contemplated Church was dedicated on November 30, 1810, on St. Andrew's Day, and appropriately named after the apostle. The building remains virtually unchanged but for the addition of the Vestry in 1900.

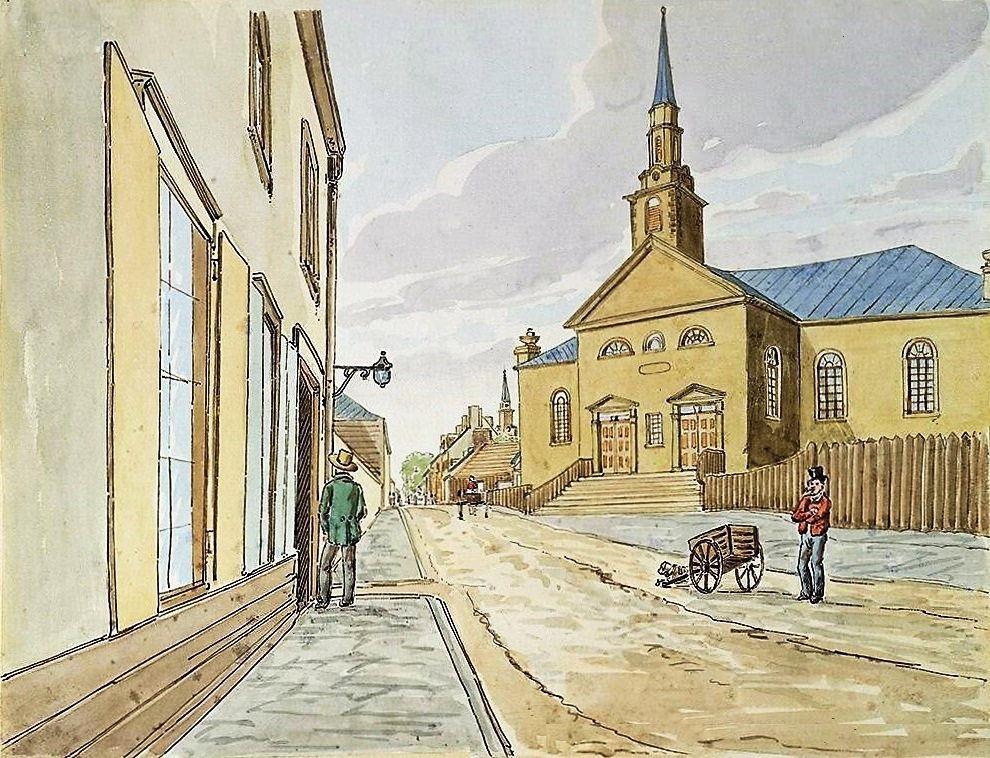
c. 1830

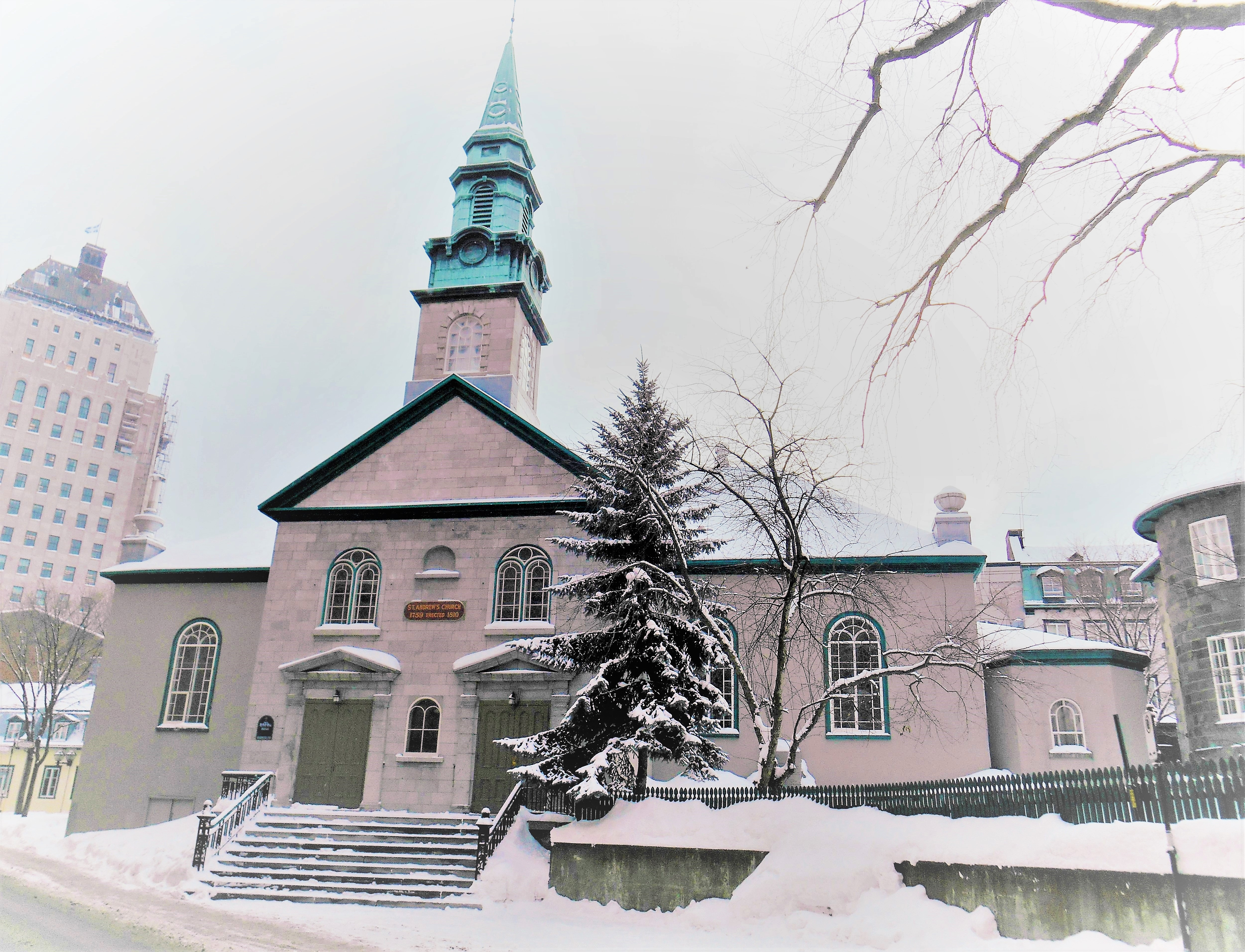
Today

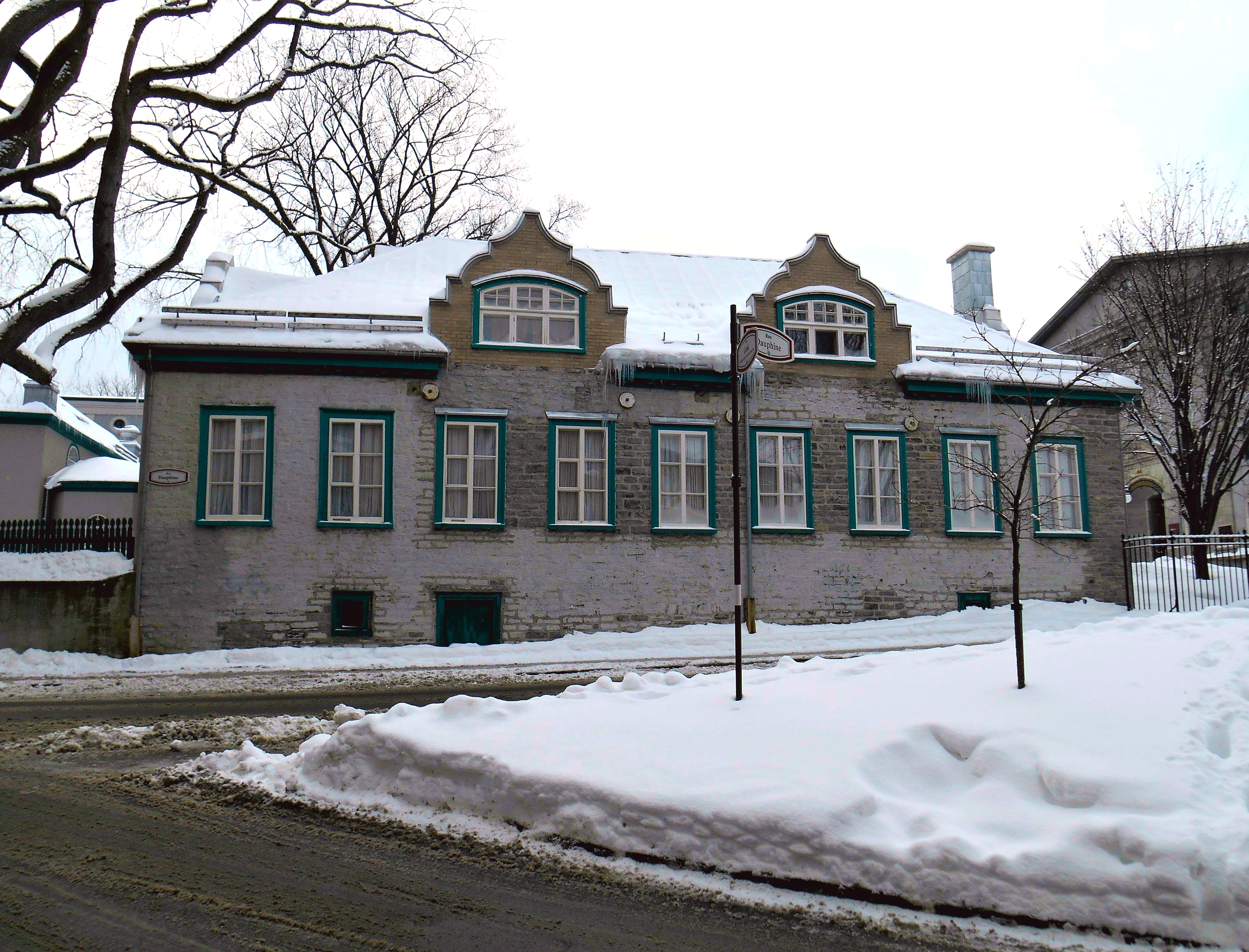
Kirk Hall

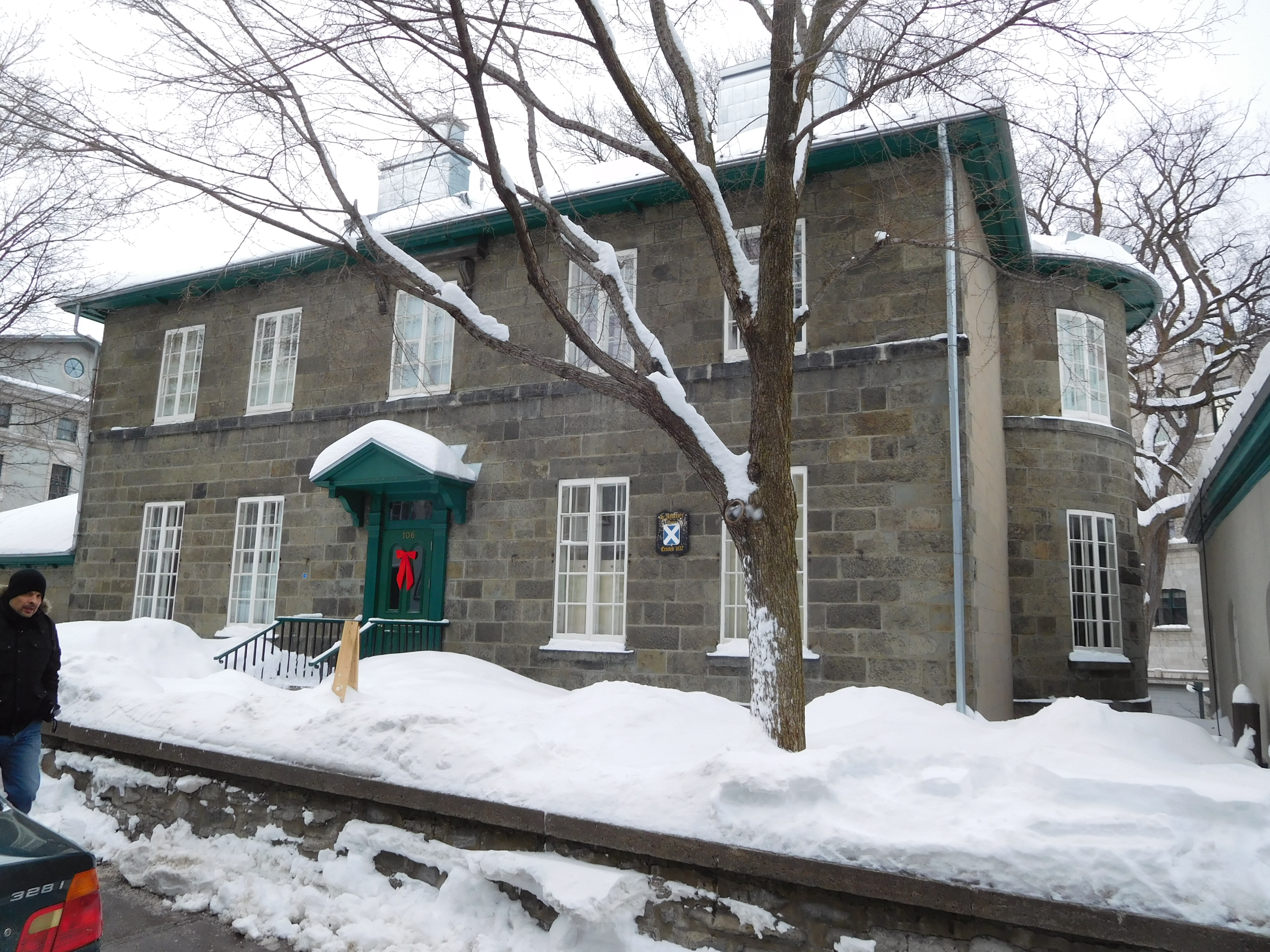
Manse

On the same triangular site with the church are the Kirk Hall, first erected in 1829 as a Protestant School which continued as a flourishing scholastic institution for many years; and the magnificent Manse erected in 1837, which was the residence of the ministers until 2017. William Reed was notably the church's organist from 1900 to 1913.

== Ministers ==
- Robert MacPherson, 1759-1765+
- George Henry, 1765–1784
- Alexander Spark, DD, 1784–1819
- James Harkness, DD, 1820-1835+
- John Cook, DD, LLD 1836–1883, Moderator of the first General Assembly of the Presbyterian Church in Canada, June 1875.
- Andrew Tannahill Love, DD, 1884–1925
- Alexander M. Gordon, DD, 1926–1941
- Harold W. Reid, DD, 1941–1945
- Donald Mackay, DD, 1945–1950
- Wilfred Butcher, DD, 1951–1964
- Edward Bragg, DD, 1964–1977
- P. Lyle Sams, 1979–1990
- Donald J. M. Corbett, PhD 1991+, former Principal of Knox College,
- Mrs. Tamiko Nakamura Corbett, Diaconal Minister, 1992–1993, Moderator of the Presbyterian Church in Canada's General Assembly, 1996.
- Ronald H. Balston, 1993–1996
- Scott Emery, 1996–2000
- Bradley Nelson (Interim Minister), 2001–2003
- Stephen A. Hayes, DD, 2004–2009
- Katherine Burgess, DMin, 2009–present

+Died in Office.
