= Agnes Maule Machar =

Canadian author, poet and social reformer

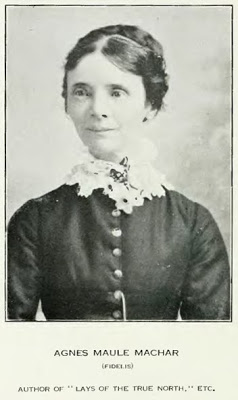
- Photo of Machar from Canadian Singers and Their Songs (1919)
- Born: January 23, 1837; Kingston, Upper Canada
- Died: January 24, 1927 (aged 90); Kingston, Ontario
- Occupation: Writer
- Writing career
- Language: English

Agnes Maule Machar (23 January 1837 – 24 January 1927) was a Canadian author, poet and social reformer. She published at least eight novels, a biography, poetry and essays, some under her own name, and others under the pen name Fidelis.

== Early life ==
Machar's father, John Machar immigrated to Canada in 1827, and married Margaret Sim (a fellow Scottish immigrant) in Montreal in 1832. The couple established themselves in Kingston, Ontario (then part of Upper Canada), where her father was the pastor of St. Andrew's Church, and second principal of Queen's University (1846–1853). The couple's first child died in infancy; Agnes was born in 1837; and her brother, John Maule, in 1841.

Apart from a brief stint at a boarding school in Montreal, Machar was educated by her father at home. By the age of ten Machar was studying Latin and Greek, instructed by her father and aided by his extensive library. Soon after she learned French, Greek and Italian. After her father’s death in 1863, she remained with her mother.

== Social circles ==
Machar moved in influential social circles, mingling with future prime minister John A. Macdonald, politicians like Richard John Cartwright, and professors at Queen's University such as George Romanes. At her summer home, Ferncliff, in Gananoque she hosted an array of visitors.

== Writer ==
Machar was a prolific writer. Her first published book, Faithful Unto Death, was a memorial to a janitor at Queen's, published in 1859. Her 1870 novel, Katie Johnstone's Cross, won the Campbell's Prize (offered by Toronto publisher James Campbell and Son), and she won the same prize again the next year for Lucy Raymond. In 1874 she received another prize, this time for For King and Country, awarded by The Canadian Monthly and National Review; the novel is probably her best known work. Writing under her own name, and the pseudonym Fidelis, Machar published at least eight novels, a biography of her father, and many poems and essays. An anthology of her poetry, Lays of the "True North" and Other Canadian Poems was published in 1899, and she coauthored six historical works.

Machar was called the "first of Dominion poetesses" by Sir Edwin Arnold. In 1887, she won the prize offered by the Week for the best poem on Queen Victoria's Jubilee.

As an essayist, Machar frequently wrote about challenges faced by Christianity in the face of rapidly advancing scientific knowledge. Her friends included prominent Darwinists such as George Romanes and Grant Allen, and she wrote that Christians should accept evolutionary theory as part of an adapting and fuller understanding of God's word. Secularist William Dawson LeSueur, although he disagreed with her, praised her arguments.

Machar also advocated for churches to deliver more charity to the poor, especially during the depressions of the late 19th century. She was particularly critical of the hypocrisy she saw where churches worked to save the souls of the poor, while disregarding their physical needs. She argued for justice, a right to work, and sufficient means to rise above a subsistence existence. Beyond her essays, she also explored these themes in her well-received 1892 novel, Roland Graeme, Knight.

Machar also advocated for prohibition and proposed that the state should establish homes for the care of impoverished elderly citizens, whom she described as "veteran[s] in the industrial army." She dedicated her own resources to this cause, bequeathing an endowment to establish the Agnes Maule Machar Home at 169 Earl Street in Kingston "for old ladies past earning their own livelihood.". The terms of her will turned the property, designed in 1849 by William Coverdale (architect), into a residence for elderly Protestant women of "gentle birth" in 1932, until its public sale in 2003.

A witness to Confederation, Machar was concerned about English–French tensions in the young country. She wrote poetry, fiction, and historical accounts of French achievements in Canada. She also wrote (unsuccessful) letters and essays pleading for clemency for Louis Riel, and, after World War I, compiled and translated letters from French soldiers who had died in the conflict.

== Feminist ==
As a feminist, Machar argued in favour of higher education and fair working conditions for women. She advocated for better conditions for women and children in shops and factories, as well as for legislation requiring shorter hours for women workers. This last demand was challenged by fellow-feminist Carrie Matilda Derick who argued that it was inconsistent with the goal of gender equality. Machar was officially connected with the National Council of Women of Canada where she read many of her papers.

== Death and legacy ==
Machar died in Kingston in 1927.

In 2015, Machar was named a Person of National Historic Significance by the federal government. She has also been recognized by the Kingston Historical Society as a prominent woman in Kingston society.

== Selected works ==
- Faithful Unto Death: A Memorial of John Anderson, Late Janitor of Queen's College, Kingston, C.W. (1859; published anonymously)
- Katie Johnstone's Cross (1870)
- Lucy Raymond: or The Children's Watchword (1871)
- Memorials of the life and ministry of the Rev. John Machar, late minister of St. Andrew's Church, Kingston (1873)
- For King and Country: A Story of 1812 (1874)
- Lost and Won
- Stories of New France (1890)
- Marjorie's Canadian Winter (1891)
- Roland Graeme, Knight (1892)
- Down the river to the sea (1894)
- Heir of Fairmount Grange (1895)
- Lays of the "True North" and Other Canadian Poems (1899)
- Stories of Old Kingston (1908)
- Stories of the British Empire (1913)
