= William Leggo =

Canadian businessman and inventor (1830–1915)

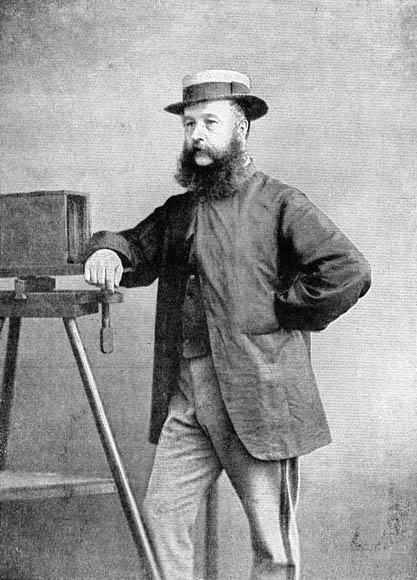
Photograph of Leggo taken in 1871

William Augustus Leggo (25 January 1830 – 21 July 1915) was a Canadian inventor, engraver and businessperson. He is noted for co-inventing the half-tone engraver with George-Édouard Desbarats. He had several patents to his name, including leggotyping and granulated photography.

== Early life ==
Leggo was born in Quebec City on January 25, 1830, to William Augustus Leggo, a bookbinder and engraver, and Margaret Grant. After graduating from Quebec High School, he apprenticed as an engraver, first to his father and then to Cyrus A. Swett in Boston.

== Career ==
Leggo worked with his brothers Thomas, Edward, and Henry in the family engraving business before partnering with George-Paschal Desbarats and Stewart Derbishire as Wm. A Leggo and Company on January 21, 1863. George-Paschal's son, George-Édouard Desbarats, joined the partnership when Derbishire died in March 1863, and became sole partner when his father died in November 1964. The two patented "Leggotyping", a type of photomechanical reproduction for letterpress printing, on February 27, 1865.

Leggo and Desbarats founded Leggo and Company in Montreal on January 21, 1868. Desbarats' newspapers, Canadian Illustrated News (est. October 1869) and L'Opinion publique (est. January 1870), both made use of Leggotyping. In 1873, the pair formed the Union Art Publishing Company and founded the New York Daily Graphic, the first daily illustrated newspaper. While it was a pioneering effort, it was not a financial success, and Desbarats returned to Montreal soon after. The paper ran until 1889, but by 1879 Leggo was also back in Montreal, where he began a business partnership with William H. Guillebaud as Leggo and Company.

Leggo died in 1915 at Lachute, Quebec.

== Publications ==
- Un art nouveau, la leggo-typie: procédé photo-électrotypique, breveté au Canada, aux États-Unis, en Angleterre, en France et en Belgique (in French). Ottawa: W. A. Leggo et Compagnie. 1867.
