= John Machar =

Canadian academic

John Machar (1796 – February 7, 1863) was the second principal (1846–1853) of Queen's College at Kingston, later known as Queen's University.

Machar was born in Tannandice, Scotland. He was ordained as a Presbyterian minister in 1819. In 1827, he emigrated to Kingston, Upper Canada in order to become the minister at St Andrew's Presbyterian Church.

Machar was one of the original trustees of the university, and became its principal in 1846, when Thomas Liddell resigned unexpectedly. He resigned in 1853, after a term marred by financial issues.

He was the father of author Agnes Maule Machar.

Academic offices
| Preceded by Thomas Liddell | Principal of Queen's College at Kingston; 1846–1853 | Succeeded by James George |
