= Patriote flag =

Flag

The Patriote flag.

The Patriote flag (also known as le Tricolore canadien) was used by the Patriote movement in Lower Canada (present-day Quebec) between 1832 and 1838.

== Origin and early use ==
The first incarnation of the Patriote flag was created in 1832 to represent the Parti patriote (Patriotes), which at the time was the largest Francophone party in the Legislative Assembly of Lower Canada. Its first major public appearance was at the release of Ludger Duvernay and Daniel Tracey. Both men had been arrested for their criticism of the appointed Legislative Council and once they were released they were met by crowds flying the Patriote flag. With their landslide victory in 1834, the Patriotes had control of the Assembly, which led the British government to call upon the new governor, Archibald Gosford, to start an inquiry into the overall situation of the colony. In response the Patriotes refused to vote on any budgetary measures in an attempt to paralyze the administration by freezing their expenses to run the courts and civil government. With the findings of the Gosford Commission deeming the assembly was not acceptable for the colony, Lord John Russell on 2 March 1837 issued the Russell Resolutions to the Assembly. With the outright refusal by the British to implement any of the Ninety-Two Resolutions and the hesitation of the Parti patriote to take up arms against the government, they instead resorted to organising demonstrations to further pressure the British into accepting their demands. It was through these demonstrations that the Patriote flag started to become associated with the reformist ideals of the party. On 1 June 1837, the leader of the Patriotes, Louis-Joseph Papineau, attended a demonstration at Sainte-Scholastique in which a Patriote flag, adorned with a maple leaf, beaver, and muskellunge, was being utilised.

A painting depicting the Assembly of the Six Counties. It shows multiple representations of the Patriote flag along with various other flags

Throughout this period other variants of the flag were utilised, two notable ones was one with a bald eagle with which had its wings open on a white star. The other one had a Canadian eagle in flight, holding a branch of maple leaves in its beak and pointing towards a star on a blue background, surmounted by the words "Our Future". This difference in the usage of British and American symbolism highlights the two significant factions within the Patriotes movement itself, the autonomists represented by Papineau who wanted greater self-governance for Lower Canada and the radicals represented by Wolfred and Robert Nelson who wanted full independence from Britain. Whilst it would be easy to assume that the usage of American symbolism was an attempt at petitioning the United States for annexation or building American sympathy for their cause, it is highly unlikely that this was the case since few Americans would have been able to see the flags in use. It is most likely that the radical wing of the Patriotes simply coopted an existing US symbol.

Seeing the increased popularity of the flag, the Montreal Herald on 20 October 1837 recommended the flag be destroyed. Later that week on 23 October at a demonstration in Saint-Charles, the Patriote flag was hoisted on the "liberty pole" alongside French revolutionary flags and other banners with messages such as "Liberty! We'll Conquer or Die for Her." With the failure of the Lower Canadian Rebellion, the Patriote flag eventually fell out of common use by the 1840s. A vertical bi-colour version of the Patriote flag containing green and white was adopted by the Société Saint-Jean-Baptiste (SSJB) in 1842 but it did not enjoy the same success as its predecessor. By the mid 1840s most organisations, including the SSJB, had abandoned the old flag in favour of the French tricolour, preparing the way for the re-emergence of the fleur-de-lis within the French-Canadian community. The Maple leaf would also go onto become a popular symbol for representing Canada.

== Symbolism ==
The specific meanings of the Patriote flag colours and layout are not confirmed but there are some theories as to what they represented. A common interpretation is that the flag was inspired by the French tricolour. The three colours have been understood as symbolising respectively the Irish, French Canadians, and British. One interpretation claimed that the white represented the purity of Canadian motives, green the hope that the King would give justice to Canada in correcting abuses, and red from the British flag as a symbol of loyalty. Another view was that the green, white and red, symbolized republican virtues and the contribution of the Irish, French and English to the democratic struggle in Lower Canada.

== Re-emergence and modern usage ==
Patriote flag with Le Vieux de '37

The Patriote flag had been mostly forgotten until the 1960s, when it was revived by Quebec Nationalists. It has since become a popular symbol of Quebec nationalism. A popular variant of the flag has been utilised by the MLNQ. It includes a yellow star on the upper left and Henri Julien's illustration of a Lower Canada rebel, Le Vieux de '37, in the middle.

Some demonstrators at the Freedom Convoy 2022 against Canada's COVID-19 pandemic response were seen flying the flag.

=== Usage by ultranationalists ===
The MLNQ flag has been used by members of ultranationalist and far right groups Storm Alliance and La Meute.

== See also ==
- Quebec nationalism
- Quebec independence movement
- History of Quebec
- Timeline of Quebec history
