= More Stories from Inside Quebec =

Canadian documentary television series

- Genre: Documentary
- Directed by: Dennis Miller
- Country of origin: Canada
- Original language: English
- No. of seasons: 1
- No. of episodes: 6

Production
- Executive producer: Paul Wright
- Running time: 30 minutes

Original release
- Network: CBC Television
- Release: 11 July – 29 August 1967

Related
- Eight Stories Inside Quebec

More Stories From Inside Quebec is a Canadian documentary television series that aired on CBC Television in 1967.

== Premise ==
This series of documentaries presented Quebec culture for English-Canadian audiences. Episodes featured people and topics such as Brother Andre of Saint Joseph's Oratory, federal politician Jean Marchand, Quebec Liberal Party president Eric Kierans, and women from rural Quebec communities who developed their careers in Montreal.

== Scheduling ==
This half-hour series was broadcast on Tuesdays at 10:30 p.m. (Eastern) from 11 July to 29 August 1967.
