= Alexander Somerville =

Scottish radical journalist and soldier

Alexander Somerville (15 March 1811 – 17 June 1885) was a British Radical journalist and soldier.

Somerville had joined the Royal Scots Greys regiment of the British Army in December 1831. In May 1832, during the disturbances caused by the Reform Bill, Somerville wrote to a newspaper claiming that the army would protect property but would not stop citizens exercising their rights and would not support a military government. Officers in the army wanted to punish him but because he had not broken the law they ordered him at riding school to ride an unruly horse. When he dismounted and refused to remount he was court-martialled and punished with 100 lashes. He was supported by newspapers and MPs as they believed he had been punished for his political opinions. The court of inquiry acquitted his commanding officer but Somerville's questioning of the officers aroused suspicions that he had been flogged for the letter. He purchased his discharge from the army after a subscription was raised.

Richard Cobden persuaded Somerville to join the Anti-Corn Law League in August 1842. He promoted free trade in rural areas where protectionism was in the ascendant. He recorded what he found and Friedrich Engels quoted him in his The Condition of the Working Class in England (1845). These were later published in three volumes under the title Whistler at the Plough (1852–53). However he later fell out with Cobden due to his pacifism which he considered as weakening Britain.

Somerville moved to Canada with his family in 1858. He was suffering serious financial problems and was also thoroughly disenchanted with Cobden and his pacifist views. His wife died shortly after their arrival in Canada. Although they were living in poverty, Somerville contributed to Canadian journalism in a number of ways. His Narrative of the Fenian Invasion of Canada was an important piece of writing. He wrote for two versions of the newspaper Canadian Illustrated News. Supposedly about 5000 pages of memoirs which have never been found were written in his last years. He ended his years residing in a woodshed and writing while living in abject poverty.

== Writings ==
- History of the British Legion, and War in Spain (1839).
- Public and Personal Affairs (1839).
- Dissuasive Warnings to the People on Street Warfare, 7 numbers (1839).
- Memoirs of Serjeant Paul Swanston, being a Narrative of a Soldier's Life (1840).
- The Autobiography of a Working Man (1848).
  - The Autobiography of a Working Man (1848); new edition with introduction by J. Carswell (1951).
- The Whistler at the Plough, 3 vols. (1852–3).
  - The Whistler at the Plough, 3 vols. (1852–3); facsimile edition with introduction by K.D.M. Snell (1989), pp. iii–xxxi.
- Free Trade and the League, 2 vols. (1853).
- Life of Roger Mowbray (1853)
- Cobdenic Policy the Internal Enemy of England (1854).
- Conservative Science of Nations, being the First Complete Narrative of Somerville's Diligent Life in the Service of Public Safety in Britain (1860).
- Narrative of the Fenian Invasion of Canada (1866).
- Case of Colonel Booker. The Court of Inquiry Reviewed RG 330 Brock University Library Digital Repository
