= Michelle Desbarats =

Canadian poet

Michelle Desbarats is a Canadian poet.

Born in Winnipeg, Manitoba, she lives in Ottawa, Ontario.

Desbarats was a finalist in the CBC/Saturday Night National Poetry Contest. In 1998, her first book of poetry, Last Child to Come Inside, was published by Carleton University Press. She has also received the Ontario Arts Council-Works in Progress grant.
