= Jules-Isaïe Benoît Livernois =

Canadian businessman and photographer

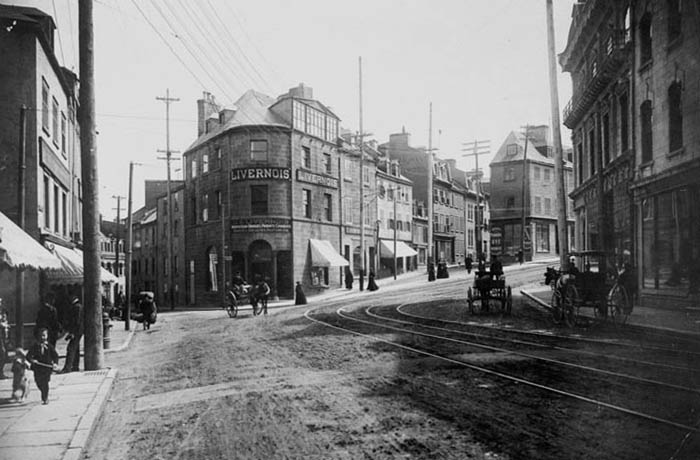
Livernois Studio, c.1890

Jules-Isaïe Benoît Livernois (October 22, 1830 – October 11, 1865) was a businessman and photographer from Lower Canada.

Jules-Isaïe Benoît, who was commonly known by the surname of Livernois, is important to Canadian history for his contributions and development of the photography industry in Quebec. Benoît's Livernois studio opened in 1854 and was operated by multiple generations of the Livernois family until its closure in 1979. His careful and highly skilled treatment of his craft preserved many aspects of cultural history in 19th century Quebec City.

Livernois studios was founded on Rue Saint-Jean in Quebec City, and at the time specialized in daguerreotype portraits and, later, cartes-des-visites. Following significant success, two more studios were opened and Livernois began also photographing French Canadian historical artifacts and monuments. Livernois died of tuberculosis in 1865 at the age of 34.

== Photographer family ==
His wife and business partner, Élise L'Heureux, was also a prominent photographer. One of their six children, son Jules-Ernest (commonly known as Jules-Ernest Livernois, born 1851), followed in his parents' footsteps, traveling throughout Quebec taking landscape photos and outdoor group portraits. in 1874, Jules-Ernest took over the photography business his parents started twenty years prior. In 1989, Jules-Ernest was one of four 19th-century Canadian photographers to be commemorated in the Canadian Photography series, marking the 150th anniversary of the first photograph taken in Canada, with a postage stamp issued by Canada Post.
