= Canadian Illustrated News =

Canadian weekly illustrated magazine

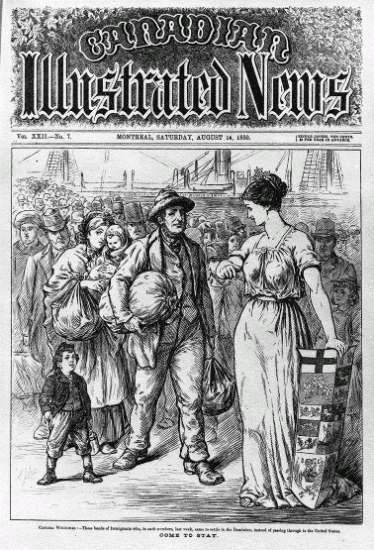
- Come to Stay, printed in 1880 in the Canadian Illustrated News, which refers to immigration to the Dominion of Canada
- Publisher: George Desbarats
- Founded: 1869
- Ceased publication: 1883
- Headquarters: Montreal, Quebec, Canada

The Canadian Illustrated News was a weekly Canadian illustrated magazine published in Montreal from 1869 to 1883. It was published by George Desbarats.

The magazine was notable for being the first in the world to consistently produce photographs at a successful rate. This was possible with the financial backing of George Desbarats, as well as the invention of half-tone photoengraving by William Leggo. The Canadian federal MP Fabien Vanasse was one of the notable journalists of the publication.

More than 15,000 illustrations were published during the magazine's 14 years of existence, before it stopped publication as it accumulated losses.

The magazine had a French language counterpart also published by Desbarats called L'Opinion publique, that published many times the English magazine's illustrations and many of its articles translated into French.

Many notable prints in Canadian Illustrated News are kept in various museums. For example, a print by Henri Julien of the Royal Military College of Canada Uniform of Cadets, is in the Canadian War Museum in Ottawa, Ontario. A print by Arthur William Moore (1863–1909), a landscape artist, of the Royal Military College of Canada Kingston, Ontario "The Canadian Military College, From the Walls of Fort Henry c. 17 June 1876" is in the Library and Archives Canada.

== Notable contributors ==
- Alexander Somerville
- John Henry Walker
- William Armstrong
- Rosanna Eleanor Leprohon
- Ellen Kyle Noel

== See also ==
- List of newspapers in Canada
