= Amable Dionne =

Canadian politician (1782–1852)

- Born: November 30, 1781; Kamouraska
- Died: May 2, 1852 (aged 70)

Amable Dionne (November 30, 1782 – May 2, 1852) was a businessman, seigneur and political figure in Lower Canada and Canada East.

He was born in Kamouraska in 1782 and grew up there. He became a clerk for Pierre Casgrain, a merchant at Rivière-Ouelle, and, in 1811, was made a partner in the business. In the same year, he married Catherine Perreault, the niece and daughter by adoption of the local seigneur, Jacques-Nicolas Perrault. In 1818, he established his own business. Dionne served in the local militia, reaching the rank of major. He purchased the seigneuries of La Pocatière and Grande-Anse during the 1830s. In 1830, he was elected to the Legislative Assembly of Lower Canada for Kamouraska; he was reelected in 1834. He supported the Ninety-Two Resolutions but did not support the rebellion that followed. Dionne was named to the Legislative Council in 1837 and then served as a member of the Special Council after the suspension of the constitution.

In 1842, he was named to the Legislative Council of the Province of Canada and served until his death at Sainte-Anne-de-la-Pocatière (later La Pocatière) in 1852.

His son Élisée became a lawyer and later served as a member of the Legislative Council of Quebec. His daughters married important men in the province including:

- Olivier-Eugène Casgrain, seigneur of L'Islet
- Pierre-Elzéar Taschereau, a lawyer and politician
- George-Paschal Desbarats, a publisher and later the Queen's Printer
- Jean-Thomas Taschereau, a lawyer and later judge in the Quebec Superior Court
- Jean-Charles Chapais, a businessman and later a member of the Canadian House of Commons
- Ludger Têtu, a doctor
