= George-Édouard Desbarats =

George-Édouard-Amable Desbarats (5 April 1838 – 18 February 1893) was an influential Canadian printer and inventor.

== Life and career ==
The Desbarats were an established printing family. The first of the family to settle was Joseph Desbarats from Auch in France, and who arrived in with the Régiment de la Sarre in New France in 1756.

Joseph's son Pierre-Édouard co-purchased the Nouvelle Imprimière (New Printing Office) from William Vondenvelden in 1798; the printer was responsible for printing the Lower Canadian Statutes, and also published newspapers such as the Quebec Mercury and other publications. Pierre-Édouard's third son George-Paschal Desbarats took over the business in 1828 and was named Queen's Printer in 1841.

George-Édouard was born to George-Paschal and his first wife Henriette, daughter of Amable Dionne. He was sent to College of the Holy Cross in Worcester, Massachusetts, 1846. He studied law at the Université Laval, and was called to the bar of Lower Canada on 2 May 1859. In 1860 he married Lucianne (Lucie-Anne) Bossé, who was the eldest daughter of Joseph-Noël Bossé. They had two daughters and five sons together.

On his father's death Desbarats became co-Queen's Printer with Malcolm Cameron for the Province of Canada. Desbarats had the Desbarats Block building constructed in Ottawa when the city was chosen as capital of the newly confederated Dominion of Canada. The building housed printing and binding equipment and employed up to a hundred people. Numerous government publications were among the works published there. It was burned down by arson in 1869; among the losses were the lithographic plates for a scholarly on Samuel de Champlain that his grandson Peter Desbarats stated was to have been his "monument as a publisher".

Prime Minister John A. Macdonald made Desbarats the first official printer of the Dominion of Canada that year; this made him an official government employee, as per the Act Respecting the Office of the Queen's Printer and the Public Printing effected 1 October 1869. He stepped down the next year when he found it too difficult to run businesses in both Ottawa and Montreal; he then returned to Montreal.

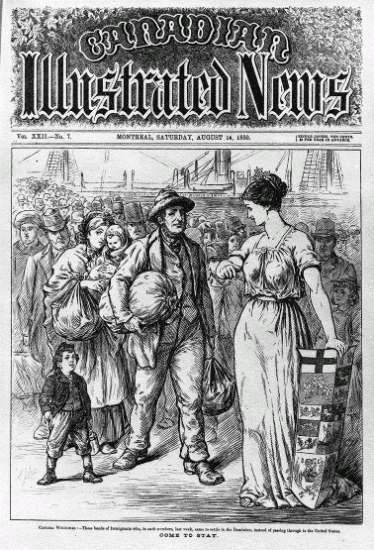
Canadian Illustrated News, 14 August 1880, front-cover illustration by Henri Julien

Desbarats and Leggo were responsible for a number of pioneering printing, including the photoelectrotyping process Leggotype, the first halftone photography reproduction in commercial printing, and photolithographic techniques at a time when the technology was still rare. They employed these techniques when they published the Canadian Illustrated News from 1869 to 1883, which printed illustrations by artists such as Henri Julien; and L'Opinion publique from 1870 to 1883. They founded the New York Daily Graphic in 1873, the first daily illustrated paper. While it was a pioneering effort, it was not a financial success, and Desbarats returned to Montreal. In 1888 George-Édouard went into business with his son William-Amable, and as Desbarats & Son they published the Dominion Illustrated.

After his death in 1893, he was entombed at the Notre Dame des Neiges Cemetery in Montreal. Desbarats left his printing business to three of his sons. A son was the engineer and civil servant George Joseph Desbarats.
