= George-Paschal Desbarats =

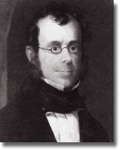
- Born: 11 August 1808; Quebec City, Lower Canada
- Died: 12 November 1864 (aged 56); Montreal, Province of Canada
- Occupations: Printer; Publisher; Landowner

George-Paschal Desbarats (11 August 1808 – 12 November 1864) was a French-Canadian printer, publisher, businessman, and landowner. From 1841 he co-held an exclusive contract as the Queen's printer.

== Life and career ==
George-Paschal Desbarats was born in Quebec City in Lower Canada on 11 August 1808, the third son of Marie-Josephte (née Voyer) and Pierre-Édouard Desbarats, a printer and Deputy Registrar of the Legislative Assembly of Lower Canada.

Desbarats attended the school of the Presbyterian clergyman Daniel Wilkie and later apprenticed with a shopkeeper named James George and then a timber merchant in the Basse-Ville of Quebec City. He managed the family business from 1826 when his father fell ill and took it over when his father died two years later. He continued the business's relations with its co-owner Thomas Cary, and they may have co-owned Cary's Quebec Mercury newspaper from 1828 to 1848. The relationship appears to have been uneasy.

With Cary, Desbarats had a contract as printer to the Legislative Assembly of the Province of Canada as of 1841. In September 1841 Desbarats and Stewart Derbishire received an appointment as "Her Majesty's Printer and Law Printer in and for the Province of Canada"; as the Queen's printers they had an exclusive contract to print and distribute government publications in the Province of Canada, a contract Desbarats maintained throughout his life. He thus moved as the capital did throughout the period to Kingston, Montreal, Toronto, and Quebec City, where in 1860 he and Derbishire established a business with the help of his son George-Édouard Desbarats and were responsible for the publication of works by such French-Canadian writers as Philippe-Joseph Aubert de Gaspé and Ernest Gagnon as well as the literary journal Le Foyer canadien. Amongst his commissions were the reprinting of Samuel de Champlain's works, completed after his death by George-Édouard in 1870.

Desbarats was active in industry and financing. He invested in railways and mining, and with Derbishire he acquired the Ottawa Glass Works near Vaudreuil, one of the province's first glassworks. He invested in the St. Lawrence and Atlantic Railroad, which he promoted with a pamphlet in 1849 titled The St. Lawrence and Atlantic Railroad: its position as a private undertaking, and advantages as a national work.

In 1847 Desbarats bought many properties and tracts of land, including one in the Chaudière valley where gold was being prospected, and a mining tract north of Lake Huron called the Desbarats Location. He was secretary of the Montreal Mining Company in 1847 and became president of the St Lawrence Mining Company in 1854.

Desbarats married three times, first to Henriette Dionne, daughter of Amable Dionne. After she died, Desbarats remarried in 1841 to Charlotte Selby, daughter of the doctor William Selby, who had died a few years earlier; there was some resistance to the marriage as Desbarats was perceived to come from a lower social rank than the daughter of a prominent doctor. Last he married Jessie-Louise Pothier, daughter of Legislative Councillor Toussaint Pothier. His estate in Montreal was named Rose-Pré.

Desbarats died in Montreal on 12 November 1864. His son George-Édouard inherited the printing plant in Ottawa in 1865 and continued to expand the business.

== Works cited ==
- Davis, Angela E. (1995). Art and Work: A Social History of Labour in the Canadian Graphic Arts Industry to the 1940s. McGill-Queen's Press. ISBN 978-0-7735-1280-1.
- Desbarats, Aileen (1976). "Desbarats, George-Paschal". Dictionary of Canadian Biography. University of Toronto / Université Laval. Archived from the original on 6 September 2015.
- Galarneau, Claude (1991). "Les Desbarats: une dynastie d'imprimeurs-éditeurs (1794–1893)" [The Desbarats: A Dynasty of Printer-Publishers (1794–1893)] (PDF). Les Cahiers des dix (in French) (46). Les Éditions La Liberté: 125–149. doi:10.7202/1015584ar.
- Government of Quebec staff (2013). "Desbarats, George-Paschal". Répertoire du patrimoine culturel du Québec. Government of Quebec. Archived from the original on 12 September 2015.
- Ward, Peter (1990). Courtship, Love, and Marriage in Nineteenth-Century English Canada. McGill-Queen's University Press. ISBN 978-0-7735-0749-4.
