= John Henry Walker =

Canadian engraver and illustrator

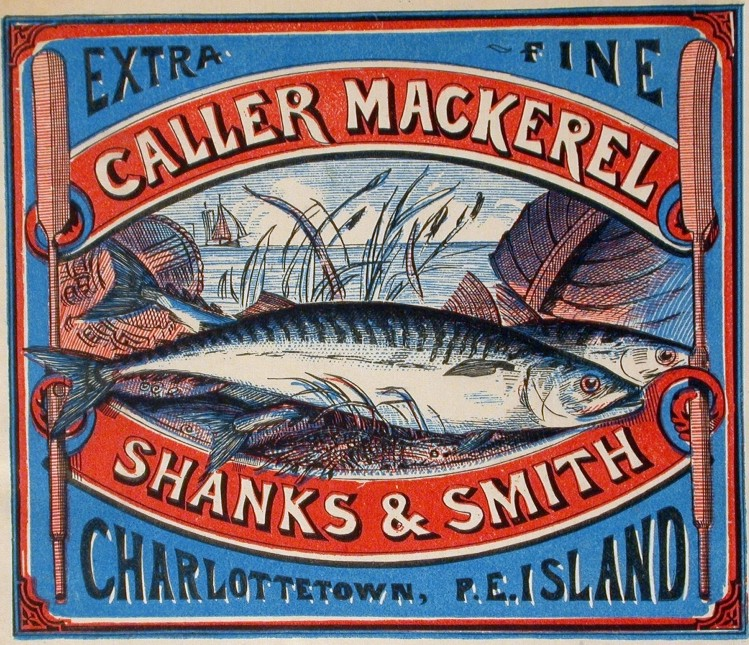
Commercial label of Caller Mackerel, Shanks & Smith, Charlottetown, Prince Edward Island

John Henry Walker (1831–1899), a pioneer Canadian engraver and illustrator, was from County Antrim in Northern Ireland and as a young boy emigrated in 1842 to Canada with his family, settling in Toronto, Upper Canada. In 1845 he was apprenticed for three years to the engraver Cyrus A. Swett, where he was trained in copper and wood engraving.

Walker provided the engravings for catalogues, government reports, advertisements and magazines such as The Canadian Illustrated News, L'Opinion Publique and Le Monde Illustré, and produced the front-cover illustration for his launching of Punch in Canada in 1849. The magazine was styled on the English Punch and failed when published by Walker as a weekly. His other short-lived humorous periodicals were The Jester, Grinchuckle and Diogenes. He is regarded as a pioneer of political cartooning in Canada and dominated engraving in Montreal from 1845 into the 1890s. His legacy of illustrations provides a rich insight into life in Victorian Canada.

== Gallery ==
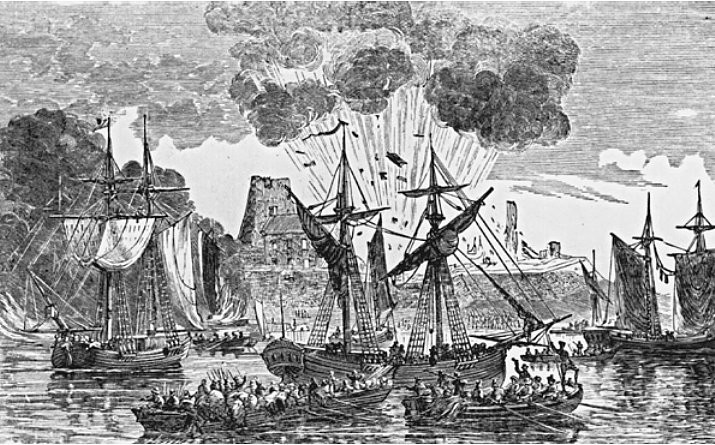
The capture of French Fort Frontenac by the British in 1758

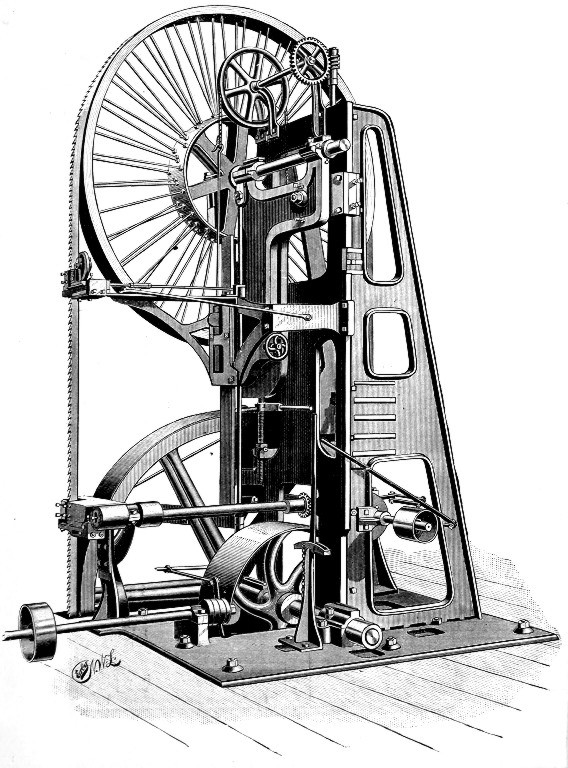
Engraving of a bandsaw 1850–185

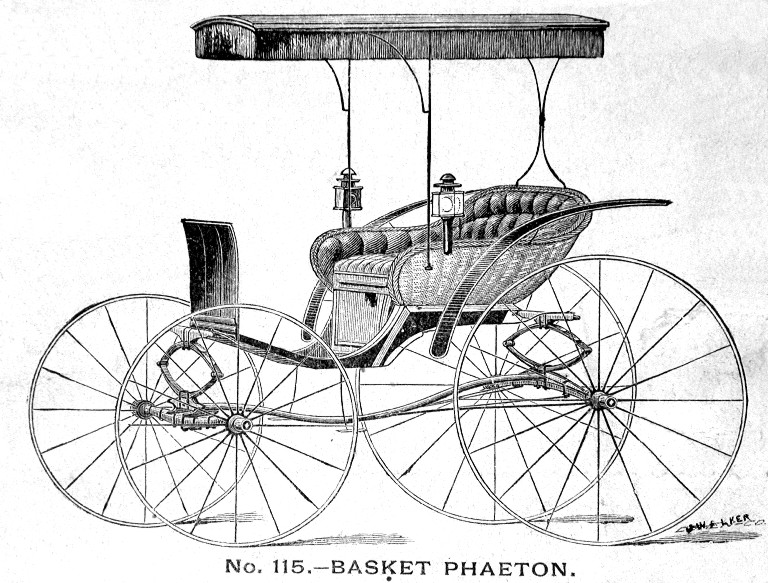
Wood engraving of basket phaeton, c. 1870
