= Peter Desbarats =

Canadian author, playwright and journalist (1933–2014)

- Born: July 2, 1933; Montreal, Quebec, Canada
- Died: February 11, 2014 (aged 80); London, Ontario, Canada
- Occupations: journalist, writer
- Known for: Global News anchor, Toronto Star columnist

Peter Hullett Desbarats, OC (July 2, 1933 – February 11, 2014) was a Canadian author, playwright and journalist. He was also the dean of journalism at the University of Western Ontario (1981–1997), a former commissioner in the Somalia Inquiry and a former Maclean-Hunter chair of Communications Ethics at Ryerson University in Toronto, Ontario.

Until his death from Alzheimer's disease, he lived in a heritage home with his actress wife Hazel in the East Woodfield Heritage Conservation District in London, Ontario.

== Early life ==
Peter Desbarats was born on July 2, 1933 to Hullett Desbarats (1909-1963), a descendant of the printer and publisher George-Édouard Desbarats by way of his son Hullet Charles Henri Desbarats) and Margaret Rettie. The family lived on Connaught Avenue in the Notre-Dame-de-Grâce neighbourhood of Montreal, where Peter attended Loyola High School.

== Career ==
Before he was appointed dean of UWO's journalism school, which he successfully fought to save in the 1990s when UWO wanted to discontinue the program, he worked as a print and television journalist for 30 years, starting as a copy boy with the Canadian Press, Canada's national news co-operative, in his home town of Montreal.

Desbarats worked in London's Fleet Street for Reuters news agency, as a political reporter and foreign correspondent for the Montreal Star and as national affairs columnist for the Toronto Star. In the 1960s and early 1970s he hosted the supper-hour news and current affairs show on Montreal television station CBMT, and in the 1970s was co-anchor and Ottawa Bureau Chief for the Global Television Network, winning the 1977 ACTRA Award for best news broadcaster.

Desbarats wrote 13 books, including René: A Canadian in Search of Country, a best-selling biography of René Lévesque; Somalia Cover-Up: A Commissioner's Journal, a book about his stint on the Somalia Inquiry; and Guide to Canadian News Media, a standard journalism text; as well as several children's books and a 2002 stage play, Her Worship, about controversial London mayor Dianne Haskett. With the cartoonist Aislin, he co-wrote one of the first books of comics history in Canada, The Hecklers: A History of Canadian Political Cartooning and a Cartoonists' History of Canada. He was later a contributor to The Globe and Mail, the Ottawa Citizen and The London Free Press, as well as an active community volunteer in London.

In 2006, he was made an Officer of the Order of Canada.
