= Electoral history of Mackenzie Bowell =

List of elections featuring Mackenzie Bowell as a candidate

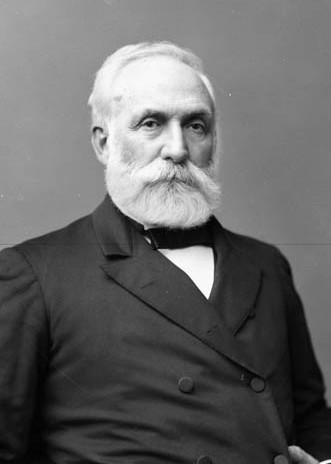
Bowell in 1891.

This article is the Electoral history of Sir Mackenzie Bowell, the fifth Prime Minister of Canada. A Conservative, he became prime minister upon the sudden death in office of Prime Minister Sir John Thompson in 1894. Bowell served a short term of just over one year as prime minister (1894-1896), until he was forced to resign over the Manitoba Schools Question. He never led his party in a general election. When he died in 1917, he was one of the last surviving members of the first House of Commons of Canada elected in 1867.

== Summary ==
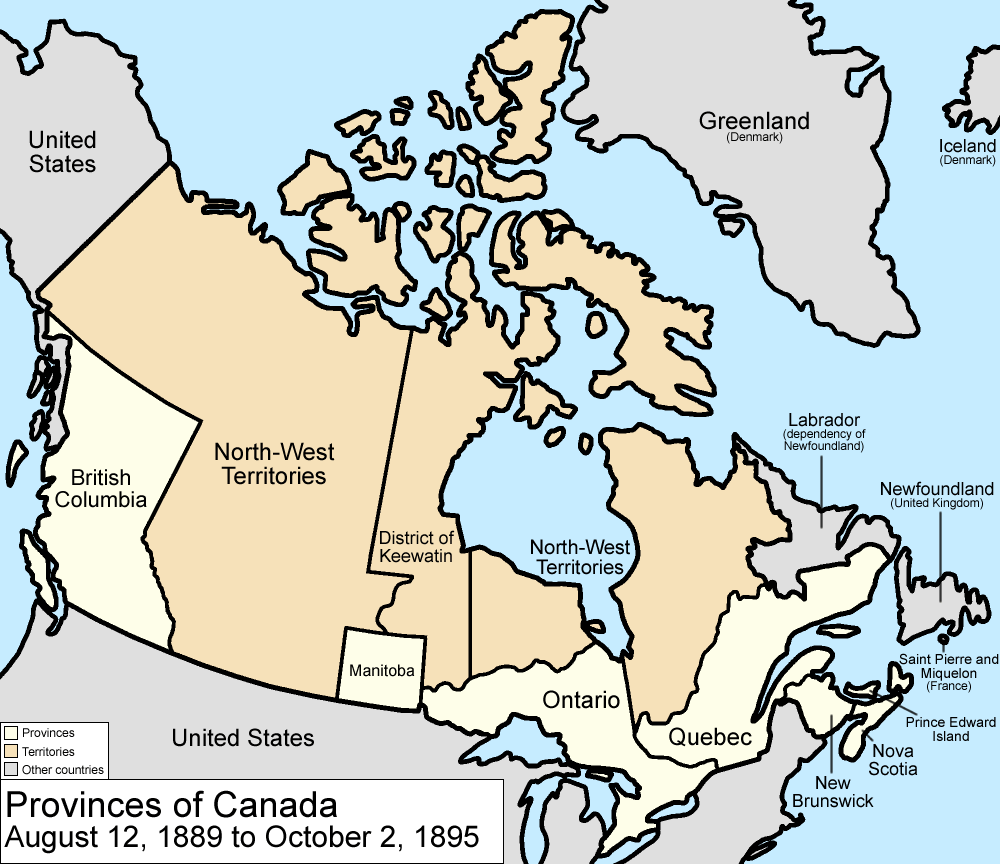
Canada had seven provinces, one territory and one semi-autonomous district during Bowell's term as Prime Minister.

Bowell ranks nineteenth out of twenty-three prime ministers for time in office, serving a short term of just over one year (December 1894-April, 1896). He became prime minister upon the death in office of Sir John Thompson and was only in office for a total of 1 year and 128 days.

Bowell was the third of five prime ministers from Ontario, the others being Sir John A. Macdonald, Alexander Mackenzie, William Lyon Mackenzie King, and Lester B. Pearson.

Although he was the leader of the combined Liberal-Conservative Party and the Conservative Party, he did not lead the party in a general election. He resigned as prime minister after a Cabinet revolt over the Manitoba Schools Question.

Bowell stood for election to the House of Commons of Canada eight times, all in the constituency of Hastings North, Ontario. He was elected all eight times, once by acclamation.

In 1892, Prime Minister Thompson appointed Bowell to the Senate of Canada. Bowell is one of two prime ministers who sat in the Senate during his term in office, rather than in the House of Commons.

Bowell was a member of the House of Commons for over 25 years, and a member of the Senate for over 25 years, for a combined total service in Parliament of 50 years, 2 months, and 4 days.

== Federal constituency elections, 1867-1891 ==
Powell stood for election to the House of Commons eight times, winning all eight (1867, 1872, 1874, 1878 (twice), 1882, 1887, and 1891), in the riding of Hastings North, Ontario.

=== 1867 Federal election: Hastings North ===
Federal Election, 1867: Hastings North, Ontario
Party	Candidate	Popular Vote	%
Conservative	Yes Mackenzie Bowell	928	59.30%
Unknown^{1}	T. C. Wallbridge	636	40.64%
Unknown	Mr McLean	1	0.06%
Total		1,565	100.00%
Source: Library of Parliament – History of Federal Ridings since 1867: Hastings North

^{1} In the early years of Confederation, there was no requirement to declare party affiliation.

Yes Elected.

=== 1872 Federal election: Hastings North ===
Federal Election, 1872: Hastings North, Ontario
Party	Candidate	Popular Vote	%
Conservative	Yes X Mackenzie Bowell	766	57.8%
Unknown^{1}	T. C. Wallbridge	559	42.2%
Total		1,325	100.00%
Source: Library of Parliament – History of Federal Ridings since 1867: Hastings North

^{1} In the early years of Confederation, there was no requirement to declare party affiliation.

Yes Elected.
X Incumbent.

=== 1874 Federal election: Hastings North ===
Federal Election, 1874: Hastings North, Ontario
Party	Candidate	Popular Vote	%
Conservative	Yes X Mackenzie Bowell	847	53.0%
Unknown^{1}	E. D. O'Flynn	752	47.0%
Total		1,599	100.00%
Source: Library of Parliament – History of Federal Ridings since 1867: Hastings North

^{1} In the early years of Confederation, there was no requirement to declare party affiliation.

Yes Elected.
X Incumbent.

=== 1878 Federal election: Hastings North ===
Federal Election, 1878: Hastings North, Ontario
Party	Candidate	Popular Vote	%
Conservative	Yes X Mackenzie Bowell	1,249	55.3%
Unknown^{1}	E. D. O'Flynn	1,008	44.7%
Total		2,257	100.00%
Source: Library of Parliament – History of Federal Ridings since 1867: Hastings North

^{1} In the early years of Confederation, there was no requirement to declare party affiliation.

Yes Elected.
X Incumbent.

=== 1878 Federal Ministerial By-Election: Hastings North ===
Federal Ministerial By-election, November 6, 1878: Hastings North, Ontario On Mr Bowell being named Minister of Customs.
Party	Candidate	Popular Vote	%
Conservative	Yes X Mackenzie Bowell	Acclaimed	–
Total		–	–
Source: Library of Parliament – History of Federal Ridings since 1867: Hastings North

Yes Elected.
X Incumbent.

=== 1882 Federal election: Hastings North ===
Federal Election, 1882: Hastings North, Ontario
Party	Candidate	Popular Vote	%
Conservative	Yes X Mackenzie Bowell	1,408	57.1%
Unknown^{1}	William Coe	1,057	42.9%
Total		2,465	100.00%
Source: Library of Parliament – History of Federal Ridings since 1867: Hastings North

^{1} In the early years of Confederation, there was no requirement to declare party affiliation.

Yes Elected.
X Incumbent.

=== 1887 Federal election: Hastings North ===
Federal Election, 1887: Hastings North, Ontario
Party	Candidate	Popular Vote	%
Conservative	Yes X Mackenzie Bowell	1,723	71.6%
Unknown^{1}	H.H. Sutton	682	28.4%
Total		2,405	100.00%
Source: Library of Parliament – History of Federal Ridings since 1867: Hastings North

^{1} In the early years of Confederation, there was no requirement to declare party affiliation.

Yes Elected.
X Incumbent.

=== 1891 Federal election: Hastings North ===
Federal Election, 1891: Hastings North, Ontario
Party	Candidate	Popular Vote	%
Conservative	Yes X Mackenzie Bowell	1,686	53.3%
Liberal	Peter Vankleek	1,480	46.7%
Total		3,166	100.00%
Source: Library of Parliament – History of Federal Ridings since 1867: Hastings North

^{1} In the early years of Confederation, there was no requirement to declare party affiliation.

Yes Elected.
X Incumbent.

== Senate appointment (1892-1917) ==
In late 1892, Bowell was called to the Senate on the advice of Prime Minister Thompson. He was the second prime minister to serve while sitting in the Senate. Following his resignation as prime minister in 1896, Bowell continued to serve in the Senate until his death in 1917. He was one of the last surviving members of the first House of Commons elected in 1867.

== See also ==
- Electoral history of John Sparrow David Thompson – Bowell's predecessor as leader of the Conservative Party and as prime minister.
- Electoral history of Charles Tupper – Bowell's successor as leader of the Conservative Party and as prime minister.
