= Electoral history of John Abbott =

List of elections featuring John Abbott as a candidate

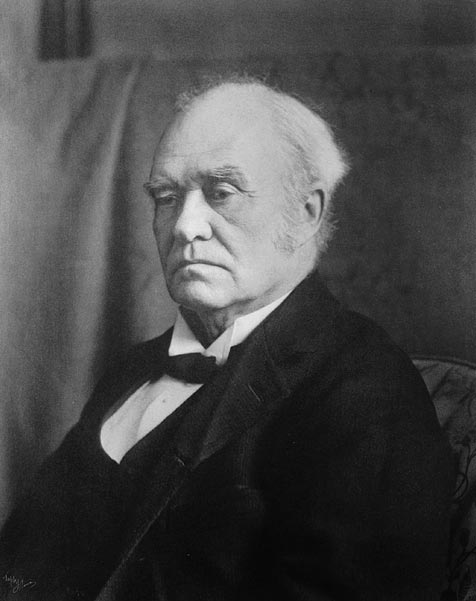
Sir John Abbott, third Prime Minister of Canada

This article is the Electoral history of Sir John Abbott, the third prime minister of Canada. A Conservative, he became prime minister upon the death in office of Sir John A. Macdonald. He served a short term as prime minister of just over one year (1891–1892) and did not lead his party in a general election. He retired in 1892 for health reasons and was succeeded by John Sparrow David Thompson.

Prior to Confederation, Abbott served three terms in the Legislative Assembly of the Province of Canada.

== Summary ==
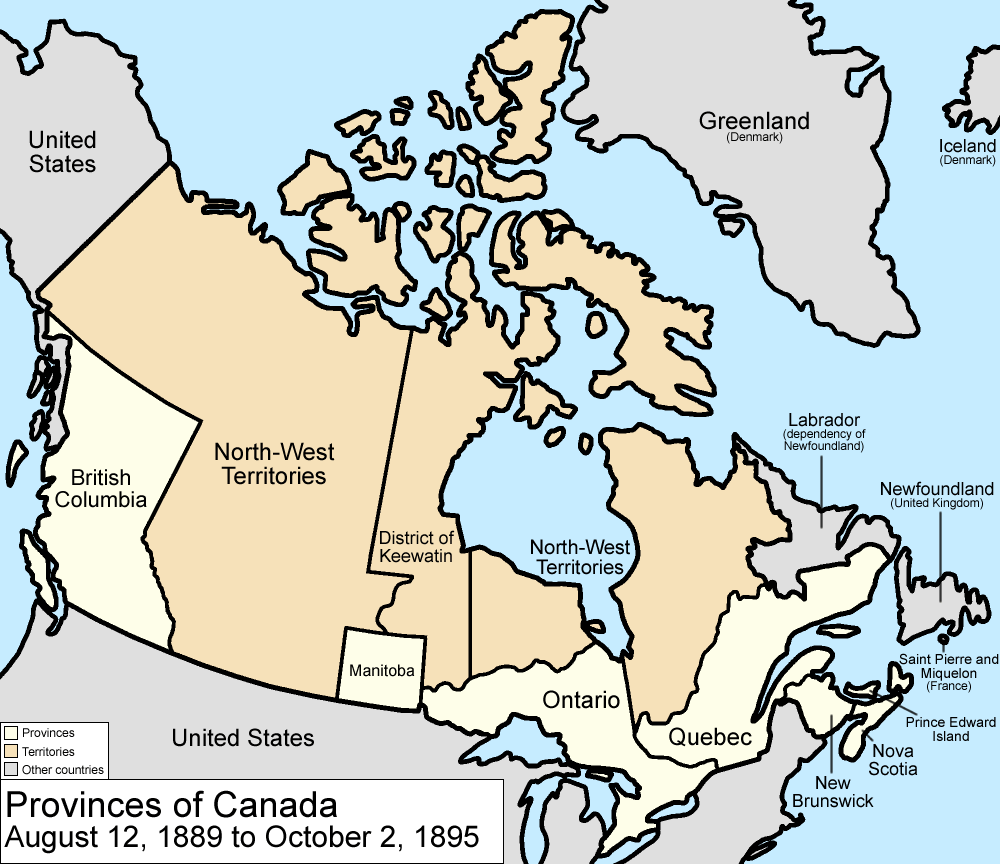
Canada had seven provinces, one territory and one semi-autonomous district during Abbott's term as prime minister.

Abbott ranks eighteenth out of twenty-three prime ministers for time in office, serving one short term of just over a year (1891–1892).

Abbott was the first of eight prime ministers from Quebec, the others being Sir Wilfrid Laurier, Louis St. Laurent, Pierre Trudeau, Brian Mulroney, Jean Chrétien, Paul Martin and Justin Trudeau.

He became prime minister upon the death in office of Sir John A. Macdonald and was only in office for a total of 1 year and 161 days. Although he was the leader of the combined Liberal-Conservative Party and the Conservative Party, he did not lead the party in a general election. He retired for health reasons and was succeeded by John Sparrow David Thompson.

Abbott stood for election to the House of Commons of Canada seven times, all in the constituency of Argenteuil, Quebec. He was elected six times and defeated once. There of the elections he ran in were declared void: in 1874 and 1880, which he had won, and in 1878, which he had lost. He contested two of the resulting by-elections, winning both. He was acclaimed three times, in the general elections of 1872 and 1882, and in the by-election of 1881.

He was appointed to the Senate of Canada in 1887. He is one of two prime ministers who sat in the Senate during his term in office, rather than in the House of Commons.

While in the Senate, Abbott also served two terms (1887, 1888) as Mayor of Montreal, Quebec.

Prior to the creation of Canada in 1867, Abbott served in the Legislative Assembly of the Province of Canada.

== Federal constituency elections, 1867–1882 ==
Abbott stood for election to the Canadian House of Commons seven times, all in the constituency of Argenteuil, Quebec. He was elected six times (1867, 1872, 1874, 1880, 1881, and 1882) and defeated once (1878).

=== 1867 Federal election: Argenteuil ===
Federal Election, 1867: Argenteuil, Quebec
Party	Candidate	Popular Vote	%
Liberal-Conservative	Yes John Abbott	693	53.8%
Unknown	B. Hutchins	595	46.2%
Total		1,288	100.0%
Source: Library of Parliament – History of Federal Ridings since 1867: Argenteuil

Yes Elected.

=== 1872 Federal election: Argenteuil ===
Federal Election, 1872: Argenteuil, Quebec
Party	Candidate	Popular Vote	%
Liberal-Conservative	Yes X John Abbott	Acclaimed	–
Total		–	–
Source: Library of Parliament – History of Federal Ridings since 1867: Argenteuil

Yes Elected.
X Incumbent.

=== 1874 Federal election: Argenteuil ===
Federal Election, 1874: Argenteuil, Quebec
Party	Candidate	Popular Vote	%
Liberal-Conservative	Yes X John Abbott	731	50.1%
Liberal	Lemuel Cushing, Jr.	727	49.9%
Total		1,458	100.0%
Source: Library of Parliament – History of Federal Ridings since 1867: Argenteuil

Yes Elected.
X Incumbent.

Note: The election in the Argenteuil constituency was set aside for election irregularities on October 6, 1874. In the subsequent by-election held on November 11, 1874, Abbott did not stand for election. His defeated opponent from the general election, Lemuel Cushing, Jr., was elected. That by-election was also set aside for electoral irregularities, and in the subsequent by-election neither Abbott nor Cushing contested the seat. Instead, Thomas Christie, a Liberal, was acclaimed on December 31, 1875.

=== 1878 Federal election: Argenteuil ===
Federal Election, 1878: Argenteuil, Quebec
Party	Candidate	Popular Vote	%
Liberal	Yes X Thomas Christie	919	52.5%
Liberal-Conservative	John Abbott	830	47.5%
Total		1,749	100.0%
Source: Library of Parliament – History of Federal Ridings since 1867: Argenteuil

Yes Elected.
X Incumbent.

=== 1880 Federal by-election: Argenteuil ===
On Mr. Christie's election being declared void, January 5, 1880

Federal By-election, February 12, 1880: Argenteuil, Quebec
Party	Candidate	Popular Vote	%
Liberal-Conservative	Yes John Abbott	936	51.9%
Liberal	X Thomas Christie	869	48.1%
Total		1,805	100.0%
Source: Library of Parliament – History of Federal Ridings since 1867: Argenteuil

Yes Elected.
X Incumbent.

=== 1881 Federal by-election: Argenteuil ===
On Mr. Abbott's election being declared void.

Federal By-election, August 17, 1881: Argenteuil, Quebec
Party	Candidate	Popular Vote	%
Liberal-Conservative	Yes X John Abbott	Acclaimed	–
Total		–	–
Source: Library of Parliament – History of Federal Ridings since 1867: Argenteuil

Yes Elected.
X Incumbent.

=== 1882 Federal election: Argenteuil ===
Federal Election, 1882: Argenteuil, Quebec
Party	Candidate	Popular Vote	%
Liberal-Conservative	Yes X John Abbott	Acclaimed	–
Total		–	–
Source: Library of Parliament – History of Federal Ridings since 1867: Argenteuil

Yes Elected.
X Incumbent.

== Senate appointment ==
Abbott did not stand for election in the general election of February 22, 1887. On May 12, 1887, he was appointed to the Senate by Prime Minister Macdonald, for the Quebec senatorial division of Inkerman, which included Abbott's old riding of Argenteuil. He remained in the Senate until his death in 1892.

== Mayor of Montreal ==
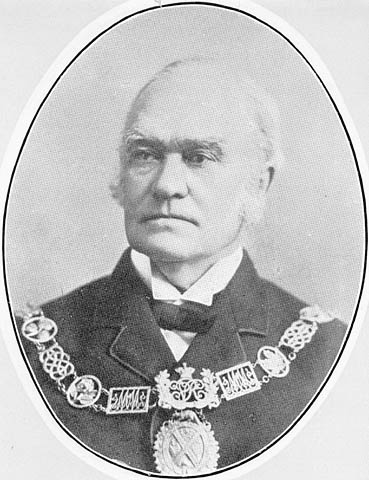
Abbott as Mayor of Montreal.

Abbott was the Mayor of Montreal for two terms, 1887 and 1888. In the 1887 election, he received 55% of the votes. In the 1888 election, he was acclaimed. He resigned as mayor in 1888.

== Province of Canada General elections, 1858–1867 ==
Abbott was elected to the Legislative Assembly of the Province of Canada three times, in the provincial general elections of 1858, 1861 and 1863, for a total of 9 years in the Legislative Assembly. Throughout this period, he represented the riding of Argenteuil, Canada East as a Liberal. In his first election in 1858, he was not initially successful, but after an inquiry into electoral irregularities, he was declared the winner by an elections committee of the Legislative Assembly.

== See also ==
- Electoral history of John A. Macdonald – Abbott's predecessor as leader of the Conservative Party, and as prime minister.
- Electoral history of John Sparrow David Thompson – Abbott's successor as leader of the Conservative Party and as prime minister.
