= Electoral history of John Sparrow David Thompson =

List of elections featuring John Sparrow David Thompson as a candidate

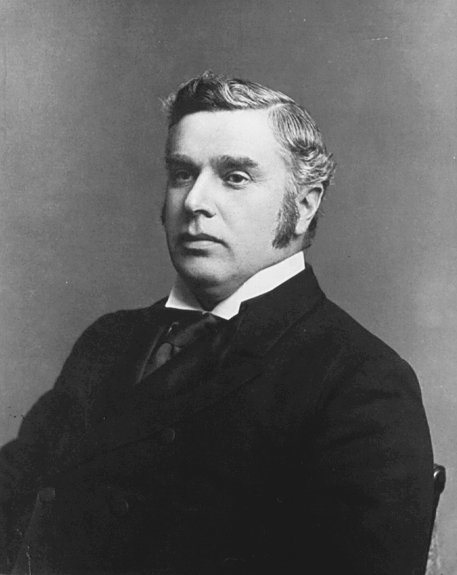
Thompson in 1891.

This article is the Electoral history of Sir John Sparrow David Thompson, the fourth Prime Minister of Canada. A Conservative, he became prime minister upon the resignation of Prime Minister Sir John Abbott in 1892. Thompson served a short term of just over two years as prime minister (1892–1894), until he died suddenly in office and was succeeded by Sir Mackenzie Bowell. He never led his party in a general election.

Before entering federal politics, Thompson was a member of the General Assembly of Nova Scotia from 1877 to 1882. He was the Attorney General for Nova Scotia from 1878 to 1882 and was briefly the Premier of Nova Scotia in the run-up to the general election of 1882.

== Summary ==
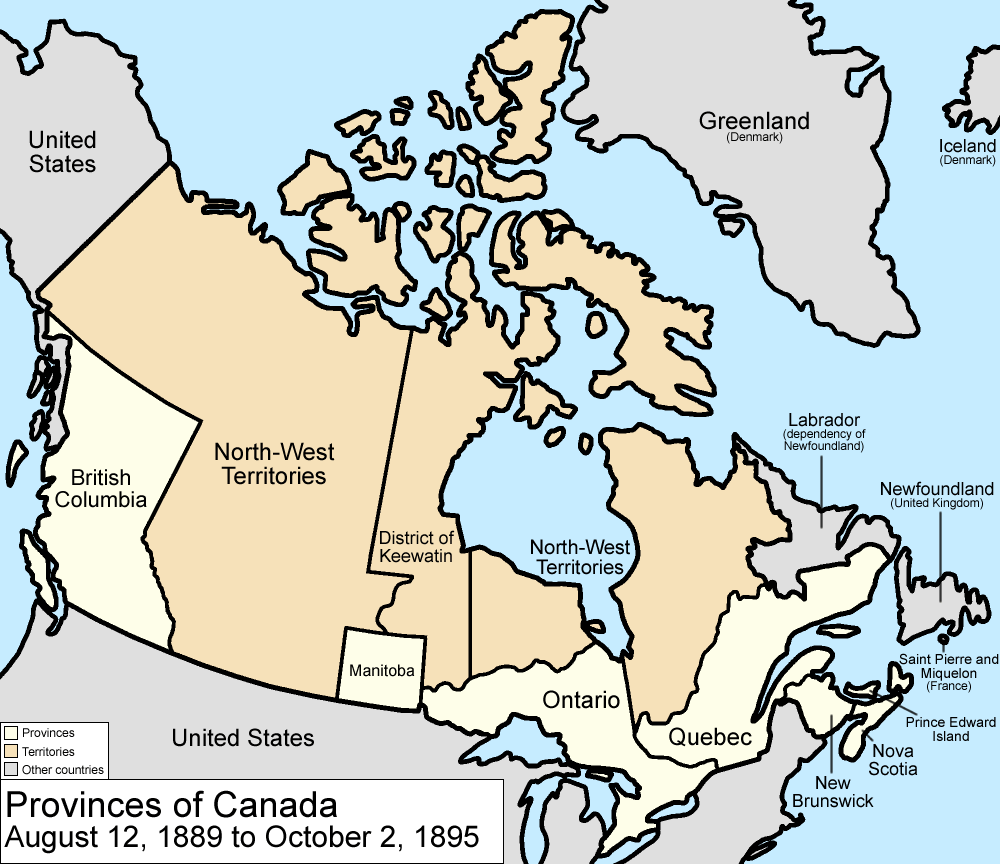
Canada had seven provinces, one territory and one semi-autonomous district during Thompson's term as Prime Minister.

Thompson ranks sixteenth out of twenty-three prime ministers for time in office, serving one short term of just over two years (1892–1894). He became prime minister upon the resignation of Sir John Abbott and was only in office for a total of 2 years and 7 days.

Thompson was the first of three prime ministers from Nova Scotia, the others being Sir Charles Tupper and Sir Robert Laird Borden.

Although he was the leader of the combined Liberal-Conservative Party and the Conservative Party, he did not lead the party in a general election. He died suddenly at Windsor Castle in England, shortly after being sworn a member of the Privy Council of the United Kingdom.

Thompson entered federal politics as the urging of Prime Minister John A. Macdonald. He stood for election to the House of Commons of Canada three times, a by-election in 1885 and the general elections of 1887 and 1891, winning all three times. He represented the federal constituency of Antigonish, Nova Scotia. He served in the House of Commons for 9 years, 1 month and 28 days.

Before entering federal politics in 1885, Thompson was a member of the General Assembly of Nova Scotia from 1877 to 1882, representing the provincial constituency of Antigonish. He was elected three times, once by by-election in 1877 and twice in general elections (1878, 1882). He was the Attorney General for Nova Scotia from 1878 to 1882 and was briefly the Premier of Nova Scotia in the run-up to the general election of 1882. Unable to form a majority government after the election, he resigned from the General Assembly and was appointed to the Supreme Court of Nova Scotia.

Thompson started his political career as an alderman in the City of Halifax from 1871 to 1877.

== Federal constituency elections ==
Thompson stood for election three times to the House of Commons and was successful all three times (1885, 1887, 1891), winning the federal seat of Antigonish, Nova Scotia.

=== 1885 Federal by-election: Antigonish ===
Federal By-Election, October 16, 1885: Antigonish, Nova Scotia
Party	Candidate	Popular Vote	%
Liberal-Conservative	Yes John S. D. Thompson	1,020	56.3%
Independent Conservative	Alexander McIntosh	792	43.7%
Total		1,812	100.0%
Source: Library of Parliament – History of Federal Ridings since 1867: Antigonish

Yes Elected.

=== 1887 Federal election: Antigonish ===
Federal Election, 1887: Antigonish, Nova Scotia
Party	Candidate	Popular Vote	%
Liberal-Conservative	Yes X John S. D. Thompson	1,247	50.8%
Independent Conservative	Angus McGillivray	1,207	49.2%
Total		2,454	100.0%
Source: Library of Parliament – History of Federal Ridings since 1867: Antigonish

Yes Elected.
X Incumbent.

=== 1891 Federal election: Antigonish ===
Federal Election, 1891: Antigonish, Nova Scotia
Party	Candidate	Popular Vote	%
Liberal-Conservative	Yes X John S. D. Thompson	1,346	54.6%
Independent Conservative	Angus McGillivray	1,119	45.4%
Total		2,465	100.0%
Source: Library of Parliament – History of Federal Ridings since 1867: Antigonish

Yes Elected.
X Incumbent.

== Nova Scotia general election, 1882 ==
Thompson unsuccessfully led the Conservative Party of Nova Scotia in one general election (1882).

Nova Scotia General Election, 1882 – Parties, Leaders, Seats Won and Popular Vote
Party	Leaders	Seats Won	Popular Vote
Liberal	None.^{1}	24	51.8%
Conservative	John S. D. Thompson	14	46.9%
Other/Independent	–	0	1.3%
Total		206	100.00%
Source: Elections Nova Scotia – Nova Scotia Provincial Elections 1867–2016

^{1} The Liberals did not have an official leader. William Stevens Fielding was the unofficial leader but declined to become premier. William Thomas Pipes eventually was chosen as the Liberal leader and premier following the election.

== Nova Scotia constituency elections, 1877–1882 ==
Thompson stood for election to the Nova Scotia House of Assembly three times, and won the provincial constituency of Antigonish each time (1877, 1878, 1882).

=== 1877 Nova Scotia by-election: Antigonish ===
In 1877, friends of Thompson in the provincial Conservative Party urged him to enter provincial politics. The seat in the provincial constituency of Antigonish was open in a by-election. With the support of the Roman Catholic Bishop of Arichat, John Cameron, Thompson won the by-election and entered the House of Assembly. (Note that the records of the vote in the by-election are not available.)

=== 1878 Nova Scotia election: Antigonish ===
Nova Scotia election, 1878: Antigonish
Party	Candidate	Popular Vote	%
Conservative	Yes X John S. D. Thompson	Acclaimed.	–
Liberal	Yes Angus McGillivray	Acclaimed.	–
Total		–	–
Source: Elections Nova Scotia – Nova Scotia Provincial Elections 1867–2016

Note: Antigonish constituency at this time returned two members to the General Assembly.

Yes Elected.
X Incumbent.

=== 1882 Nova Scotia election: Antigonish ===
Nova Scotia election, 1882: Antigonish
Party	Candidate	Popular Vote	%
Conservative	Yes X John S. D. Thompson	1,166	41.6%
Liberal	Yes X Angus McGillivray	1,094	39.0%
Liberal	Joseph MacDonald	543	19.4%
Total		2,803	100.0%
Source: Elections Nova Scotia – Nova Scotia Provincial Elections 1867–2016

Note: Antigonish constituency at this time returned two members to the General Assembly.

Yes Elected.
X Incumbent.

== Municipal elections: Halifax ==
Thompson began his electoral career in 1871, when he was elected an alderman for the City of Halifax, in Ward 5. He was re-elected in 1874 and remained an alderman until he switched to provincial politics in 1877.

== See also ==
- Electoral history of John Abbott – Thompson's predecessor as leader of the Conservative Party and as prime minister.
- Electoral history of Mackenzie Bowell – Thompson's successor as leader of the Conservative Party and as prime minister.
