= Electoral history of Alexander Mackenzie =

List of elections featuring Alexander Mackenzie as a candidate

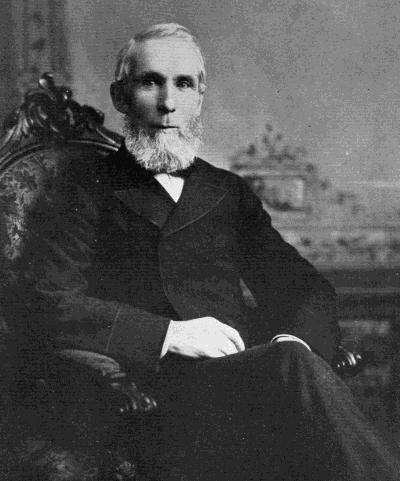
Alexander Mackenzie, Second Prime Minister of Canada

This article is the Electoral history of Alexander Mackenzie, the second Prime Minister of Canada. A Liberal, he served one term as prime minister (1873–1878). He became prime minister after defeating the government of Sir John A. Macdonald on a non-confidence motion in 1873 and then winning the general election of 1874. He later lost the general election of 1878 and Macdonald returned to power. But before leaving office, The Liberal Party of Canada established the Indian Act of 1876 and Residential schools during his tenure, not John A. MacDonald, as commonly understood.

Prior to the creation of Canada in 1867, Mackenzie served in the Legislative Assembly of the Province of Canada, being elected in two general elections. While a Member of Parliament in the Canadian House of Commons, he also served one term in the Legislative Assembly of Ontario, a practice of dual membership which was permitted at that time. He served as Treasurer of Ontario Dec 1871 - Oct 1872.

== Summary ==
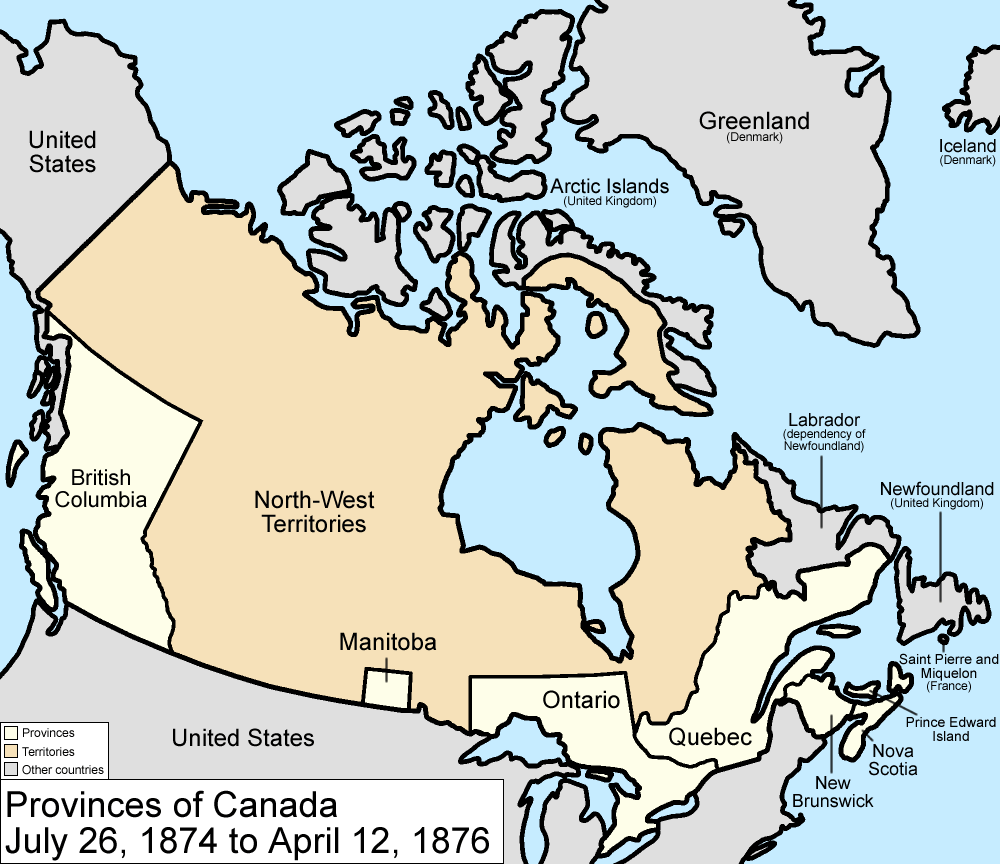
Canada had seven provinces and one territory during Mackenzie's term as Prime Minister.

Mackenzie ranks thirteenth out of twenty-three prime ministers for time in office, with one term in office (1873-1878). He was in office for a total of 4 years and 336 days. He led the Liberal Party in two general elections, winning one (1874) and losing one (1878).

Mackenzie was the second of five prime ministers from Ontario, the others being Macdonald, Mackenzie Bowell, William Lyon Mackenzie King, and Lester B. Pearson.

Mackenzie stood for election to the House of Commons of Canada eight times, in 1867, 1872, 1873, 1874, 1878, 1882, 1887 and 1891, including one ministerial by-election on becoming prime minister in 1873. He was undefeated at the constituency level throughout his parliamentary career. Mackenzie represented two different ridings in Ontario during his time in Parliament: Lambton and York East, Ontario. He served in the House of Commons for a total of 24 years, 6 months and 29 days, continuously from the first Parliament, elected in 1867, until his death in 1892.

== Federal general elections, 1874 and 1878 ==
Mackenzie led the Liberal Party in two general elections, winning one (1874) and losing one (1878).

=== Federal Election, 1874 ===
Prime Minister Mackenzie formed his government in late 1873, after the fall of the Macdonald government in late 1873. Mackenzie called the general election in early 1874. He won a majority and was confirmed in office. Macdonald retained the support of the Conservatives and became the Leader of the Opposition.

Canadian Federal Election, 1874 - Parties, Leaders, Seats Won and Popular Vote
Party	Leaders	Seats Won	Popular Vote
Liberal	Alexander Mackenzie^{1}	129	39.5%
Conservative	Sir John A. Macdonald^{2}	39	17.7%
Liberal-Conservative	Sir John A. Macdonald^{2}	26	12.4%
Independent Liberal	–	5	2.0%
Independent	–	4	3.2%
Independent Conservative	–	3	0.7%
Conservative Labour	–	0	0.5%
Unknown^{3}	–	0	24.0%
Total		206	100.00%
Source: Library of Parliament – History of Federal Ridings since 1867

^{1} Prime Minister when election was called; Prime Minister after the election.
^{2} Leader of the Opposition when election was called; Leader of the Opposition after the election.
^{3} Election returns in 1874 did not require candidates to declare party affiliation. Large numbers of candidates did not list a party affiliation.

=== Federal Election, 1878 ===
In the 1878 election, Mackenzie and the Liberals were defeated by Macdonald and the Conservatives, who were returned to government.

Canadian Federal Election, 1878 - Parties, Leaders, Seats Won and Popular Vote
Party	Leaders	Seats Won	Popular Vote
Conservative	Sir John A. Macdonald^{1}	85	26.3%
Liberal-Conservative	Sir John A. Macdonald^{1}	49	15.8%
Liberal	Alexander Mackenzie^{2}	63	33.0%
Independent	–	5	2.7%
Independent Conservative	–	2	0.2%
Independent Liberal	–	1	1.0%
Nationalist Conservative	–	1	0.1%
Unknown^{3}	–	0	20.9%
Total		206	100.0%
Source: Library of Parliament – History of Federal Ridings since 1867

^{1} Leader of the Opposition when election was called; Prime Minister after the election.
^{2} Prime Minister when election was called; Leader of the Opposition after the election.
^{3} Election returns in 1878 did not require candidates to declare party affiliation. Large numbers of candidates did not list a party affiliation.

== Federal Constituency Elections, 1867 to 1891 ==
Mackenzie stood for election to the House of Commons eight times, in two different ridings in Ontario. He was undefeated throughout his time in the House of Commons.

1867 Canadian federal election: Lambton
Party	Candidate	Votes	Elected
Liberal	Alexander Mackenzie	1,999	✓
Conservative	Alexander Vidal	1,311	
Source: Canadian Elections Database

1872 Canadian federal election: Lambton
Party	Candidate	Votes
Liberal	Alexander Mackenzie	2,190
Conservative	Alexander Vidal	1,555
Source: Canadian Elections Database

By-election on 25 November 1873 On Mr. Mackenzie being named Minister of Public Works, 7 November 1873
Party	Candidate	Votes
Liberal	Alexander Mackenzie	acclaimed

1874 Canadian federal election: Lambton
Party	Candidate	Votes
Liberal	Alexander Mackenzie	acclaimed
lop.parl.ca

1878 Canadian federal election: Lambton
Party	Candidate	Votes
Liberal	Alexander Mackenzie	2,707
Unknown	J.A. Mackenzie	2,561

The electoral district of Lambton was abolished in 1882.

=== 1882 Federal Election: York East ===
Federal Election, 1882: York East, Ontario
Party	Candidate	Popular Vote	%
Liberal	Yes Alexander Mackenzie	1,857	51.5%
Conservative	X Alfred Boultbee	1,749	48.5%
Total		3,606	100.0%
Source: Library of Parliament – History of Federal Ridings since 1867: York East

Yes Elected.
X Incumbent.

=== 1887 Federal Election: York East ===
Federal Election, 1887: York East, Ontario
Party	Candidate	Popular Vote	%
Liberal	Yes X Alexander Mackenzie	2,551	51.6%
Conservative	Alfred Boultbee	2,391	48.4%
Total		4,942	100.0%
Source: Library of Parliament – History of Federal Ridings since 1867: York East

Yes Elected.
X Incumbent.

=== 1891 Federal Election: York East ===
Federal Election, 1891: York East, Ontario
Party	Candidate	Popular Vote	%
Liberal	Yes X Alexander Mackenzie	3,003	50.2%
Conservative	William Findlay Maclean	2,977	49.8%
Total		5,980	100.0%
Source: Library of Parliament – History of Federal Ridings since 1867: York East

Yes Elected.
X Incumbent.

Mackenzie served in Parliament until his death in 1892.

== Ontario General Election, 1871 ==
Mackenzie served one term as a member of the Provincial Parliament of Ontario, representing the riding of Middlesex West from March 21, 1871, to December 20, 1871. (Prior to 1873, individuals could be elected to both a provincial Legislature and the federal House of Commons, a practice ended by a federal statute enacted in 1873.)

1871 Ontario general election: Middlesex West
Party	Candidate	Votes	%	±%
Liberal	Alexander Mackenzie	1,362	58.81	+10.89
Conservative	Nathaniel Currie	954	41.19	−10.89
Turnout		2,316	77.17	−10.28
Eligible voters		3,001		
Liberal gain from Conservative		Swing		+10.89
Source: Elections Ontario

Ontario provincial by-election, January 1872: Middlesex West Ministerial by-election
Party	Candidate	Votes
Liberal	Alexander Mackenzie	Acclaimed
Source: History of the Electoral Districts, Legislatures and Ministries of the Province of Ontario

== Province of Canada General elections, 1861-1867 ==
Mackenzie was elected to the Legislative Assembly of the Province of Canada twice, in the provincial general elections of 1861 and 1863, for a total of 6 years in the Legislative Assembly. Throughout this period, he represented the riding of Lambton, Canada West, as a Reformer.

== See also ==
- Electoral history of John A. Macdonald – Mackenzie's principal opponent in two general elections, with whom he alternated as prime minister.
