= Electoral history of John A. Macdonald =

Electoral history of Prime Minister Macdonald

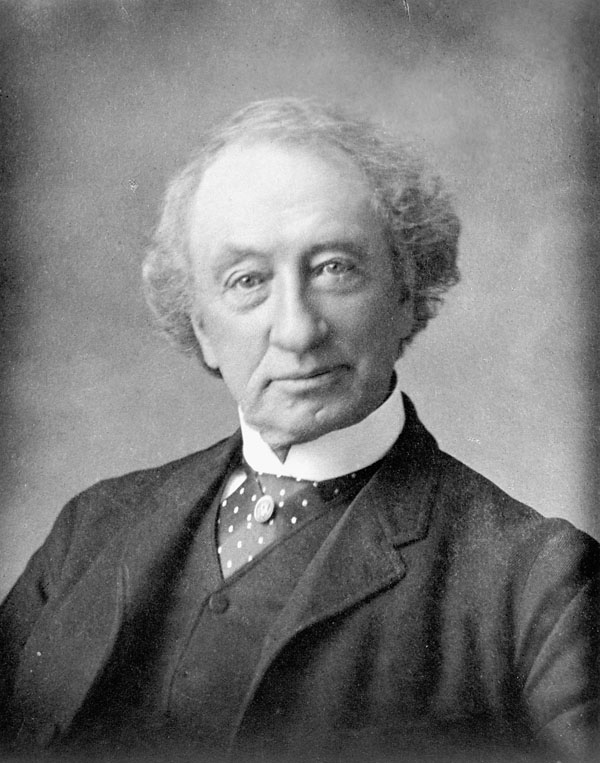

The Electoral history of Sir John A. Macdonald, Canada's founding Prime Minister, spanned over half a century from his election to the Prince Edward District Board of Education in 1834 at only age 19, to leading the Conservative Party to victory in the 1891 Dominion (federal) election three months before his death.

A Conservative, Macdonald was Canada's second longest-serving prime minister, with two separate tenures as prime minister (1867–73, 1878–91). He led his party in Canada's first seven general elections, winning six of the seven. Prior to Confederation in 1867, Macdonald he headed the colonial government of the Province of Canada as a joint premier of the Province over three stints (1856–58, 1858–-62, 1864–67) and was the leader of the Liberal-Conservatives in Canada West in the three provincial general elections held in 1857, 1861 and 1863. From June 1864 onward, he led the Great Coalition that facilitated Canadian Confederation.

Macdonald sought local electoral mandates from the voters of Kingston, Ontario for most of his public career. He was elected to Kington's Town Council as an alderman in 1843, and began his parliamentary career shortly after in 1844 when he was elected to the Legislative Assembly of the Province of Canada. He served as the members of Kington in the 2nd to the 8th parliaments of the united province, and continue to represent Kingston as its Member of Parliament in the 1st, 2nd, 3rd, 6th, and 7th Canadian parliaments. He died in office in June 1891, three months after his last victory.

Sir John A Macdonald over time
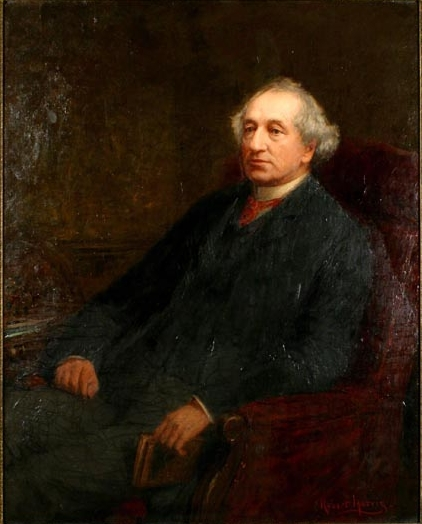
1890

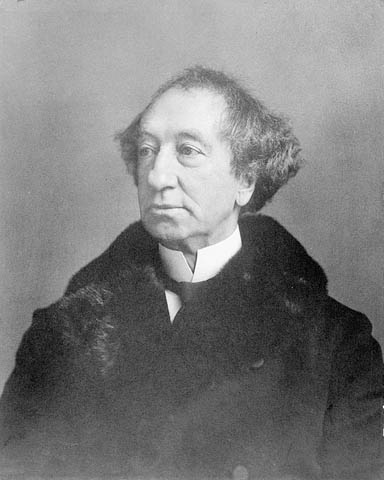
1883

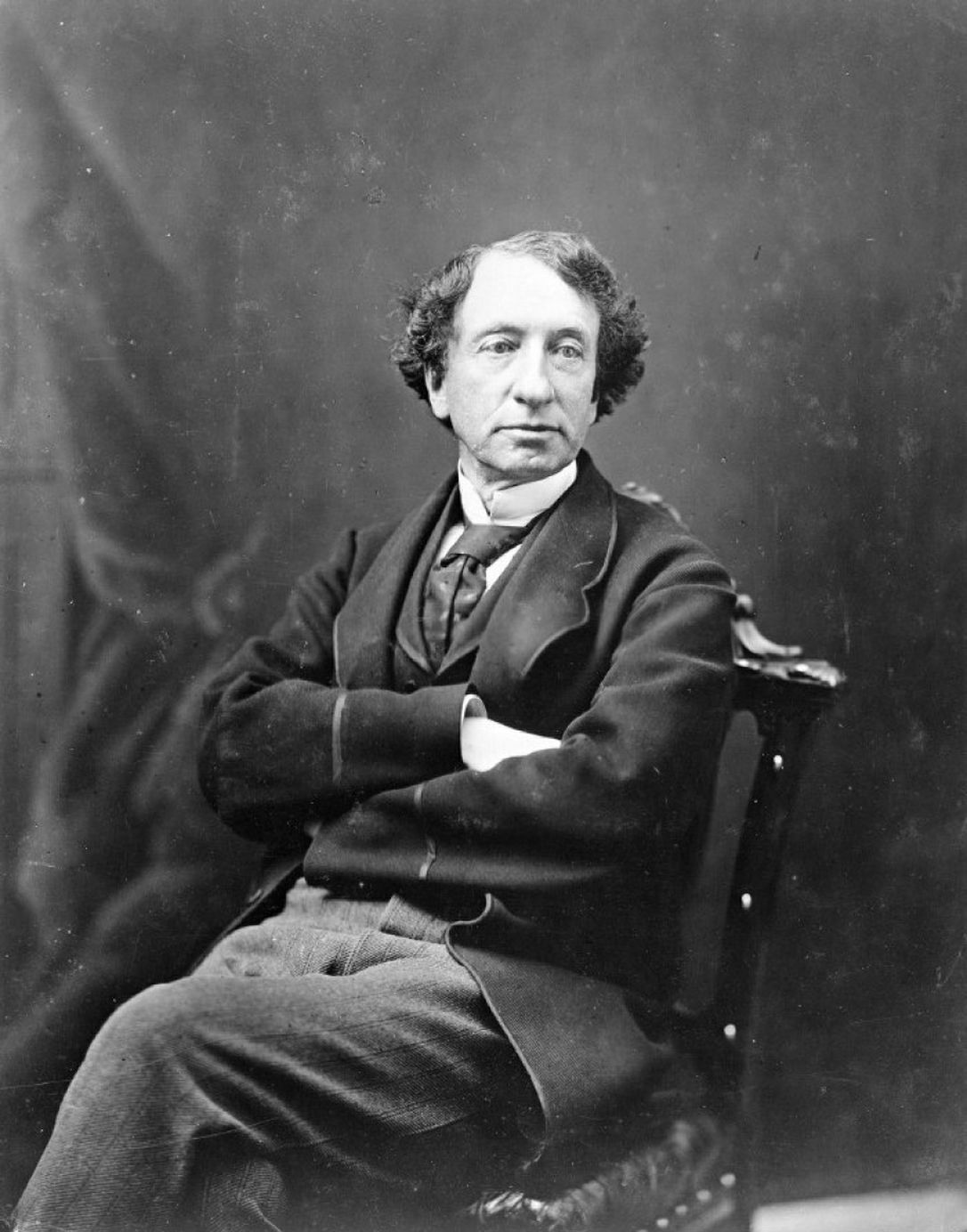
1872

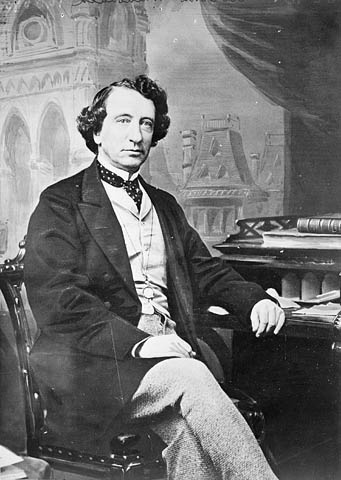
1867

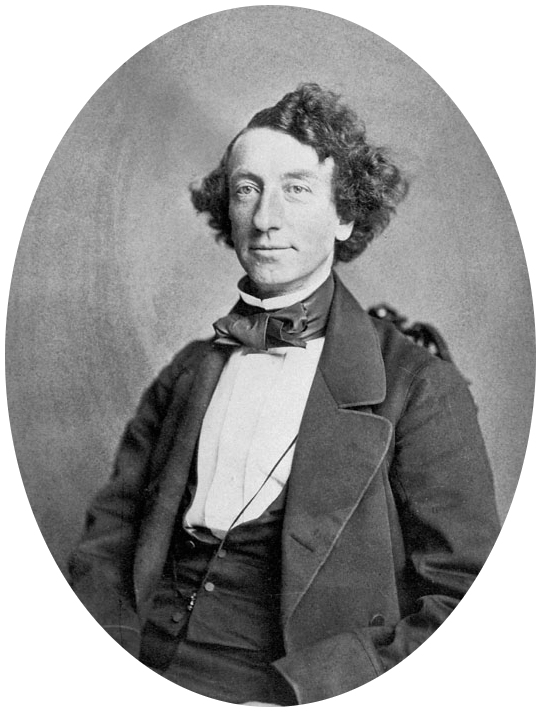
1858

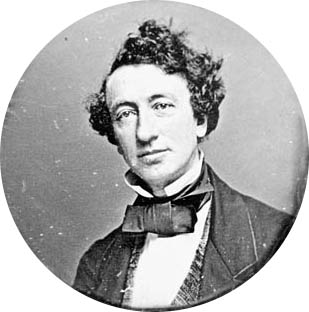
c. 1850

== Summary ==
Macdonald was the second-longest serving Prime Minister, with two separate terms as prime minister (1867–1873, 1878–1891). He was in office for a total of 18 years, 359 days. He led the combined Liberal-Conservative Party and Conservative Party in seven general elections, winning six and losing one. He is in a three-way tie with Sir Wilfrid Laurier and Mackenzie King for the number of general elections he contested as leader of a party.

His streak of four consecutive majority governments (1878, 1882, 1887, and 1891) is tied with the identical record of Laurier as the longest streak of general election victories at the federal level. His unbroken term in office from October 17, 1878 to June 6, 1891 (just under thirteen years) is the third-longest unbroken term, coming after Laurier's unbroken term in office of over fifteen years (July 11, 1896 to October 6, 1911) and King's term of just over thirteen years (October 23, 1935 to November 14, 1948.

Macdonald was the first of four prime ministers to serve non-consecutive terms, the others being Arthur Meighen (1920–21, 1926), King, and Pierre Trudeau (1968–79, 1980–84). He was the first of five prime ministers from Ontario, followed by Liberal Alexander Mackenzie who served between his two stints (1873–78), Mackenzie Bowell (1894–96), King and Lester B. Pearson (1963–68).

Year	Total seats	Result for Macdonald led Conservative	(Note: Inclusive of seats won by MPs who contested election as Liberal-Conservative Party candidates (1867 to 1911) and as Nationalist Conservative (in 1882, 1887, 1891)) Con	Lib	Opposition leader	Anti Conf	Other
1867	180	Majority mandate	100	62	George Brown	18	0
1872	200	Majority mandate	100	95	Edward Blake		5
1874	206	Opposition	65	129	Alexander Mackenzie		12
1878	206	Majority mandate	134	63	Alexander Mackenzie		9
1882	211	Majority mandate	134	73	Edward Blake		4
1887	215	Majority mandate	124	80	Edward Blake		11
1891	215	Majority mandate	118	90	Wilfrid Laurier		7

Macdonald stood for election to the House of Commons of Canada twelve times, in 1867, 1872, 1874 (twice), 1878 (three times), 1882 (twice), 1887 (twice), and 1891, although some of those were multiple elections in the same general election, as was permitted at that time. He won eleven of the elections and was defeated once in his home constituency of Kingston, Ontario. Two of his elections were set aside for electoral irregularities, in one case requiring him to stand in a by-election, which he won.

Macdonald was elected as a member of the House of Commons for five different constituencies, and at various times sat in the Commons for three different constituencies in two different provinces (Kingston, Ontario; Victoria, British Columbia; and Carleton, Ontario). He served in the Commons for a total of 23 years, 7 months, and 10 days, continuously from the first Parliament, elected in 1867, to his death in 1891.

Year	Electoral District	Total	Votes	Votes	Principal opponent	Note
1867	Kingston, ON	877	735	142	John Stewart	
1872	Kingston, ON	1339	735	604	John Carruthers	
1874	Kingston, ON	1640	839	801	John Carruthers	(Note: Carruthers was nominated Liberal candidat in 1874. Initially election voided and Macdonald unseated, elected in suubsequent by-election.)
1874 By	Kingston, ON	1761	889	872	John Carruthers	
1878	Kingston, ON	1844	847	991	Alexander Gunn	
1878	Victoria, BC	1914	896	538	Amor De Cosmos	(Note: Duo-member seat, both Macdonald and De Cosmos were elected, De Cosmos was a former provincial premier of BC.)
1878	Marquette, MB	-	acclaimed			(Note: Macdonald opted to take Victoria seat)
1882	Carleton, ON	2431	1185	617	Erskine Henry Bronson	(Note: An "independent conservative" received 629 votes)
1882	Lennox, ON	2784	1492	1292	David Wright Allison	(Note: Macdonald opted to take Carleton seat. Allison was elected in the subsequent by-election in 1883, but the by-election was voided. He was defeated in the subsequent by-election.)
1887	Kingston, ON	2719	1368	1351	Alexander Gunn	
1887	Carleton, ON	2297	1691	606	John K. Stewart	(Note: Macdonald opted to take Kingston seat)
1891	Kingston, ON	3114	1784	1301	Alexander Gunn	

Prior to the creation of Canada in 1867, Macdonald served seven terms (23 years) in the Legislative Assembly of the Province of Canada, as well as three terms as joint Premier of the Province. He was also elected alderman of his home town of Kingston, Ontario, the beginning of his electoral career.

Macdonald's combined time in the Legislative Assembly of the Province of Canada, and then in the House of Commons of Canada, totalled 46 years of elected service. His combined time as joint Premier of the Province of Canada and as Prime Minister of Canada totalled 28 years and 21 days.

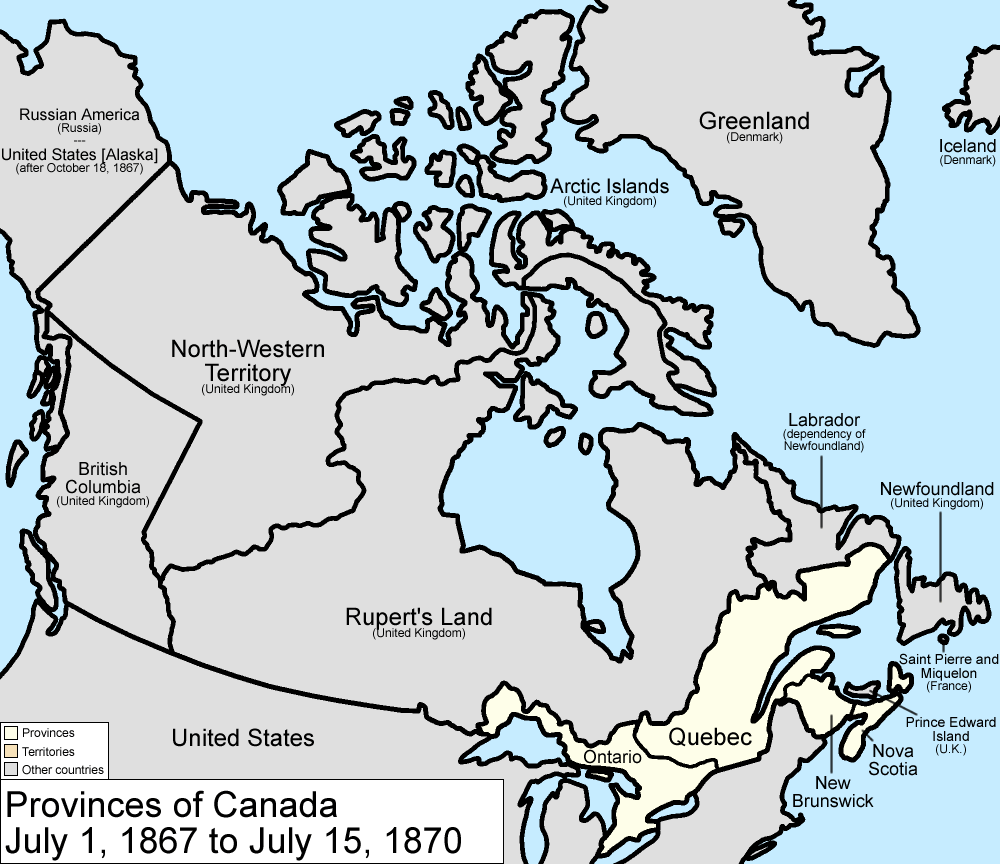
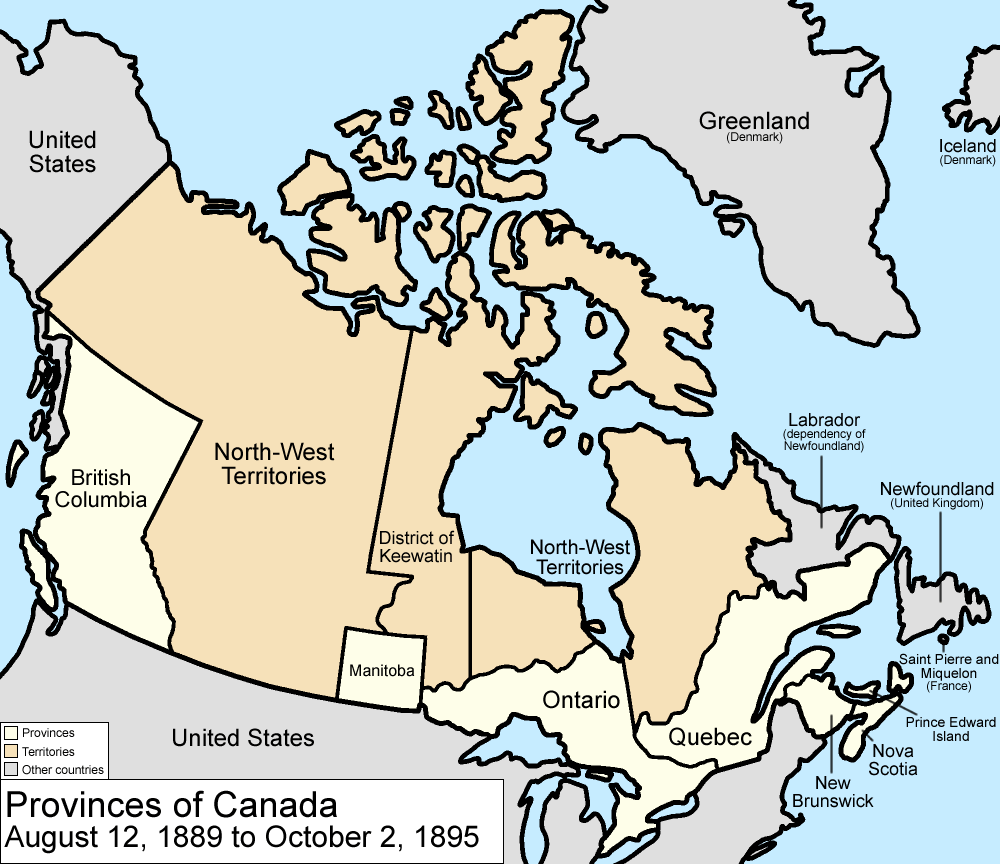
Canada had four provinces in 1867, the year Macdonald became Prime Minister, and seven provinces, one territory and one semiautonomous district in 1891, the year of Macdonald's death

== Dominion elections, 1867 to 1891 ==
Macdonald led the combined Liberal-Conservative Party and Conservative Party in seven general elections, winning six (1867, 1872, 1878, 1882, 1887 and 1891) and losing once (1874). National elections were colloquially referred to as Dominion elections, as the term federal did not gain its popular usage until the 1920s.

=== Dominion election, 1867 ===
Canada came into existence on July 1, 1867, when the British North America Act, 1867 was proclaimed in force. The first general election to Parliament was held in the summer of 1867 and resulted in a majority government for Macdonald and his coalition of Conservatives and Liberal-Conservatives. The main opposition was from the Liberals, but there was also a substantial group of Anti-Confederation Members of Parliament from the province of Nova Scotia who were opposed to Confederation and sought to dissolve the new union.

Canadian Federal Election, 1867 – Parties, Leaders, Seats Won and Popular Vote
Party	Leaders	Seats Won	Popular Vote
Conservative	Sir John A. Macdonald^{1}	71	23.45%
Liberal-Conservative	Sir John A. Macdonald^{1}	29	11.08%
Liberal	None^{2}	62	22.67%
Anti-Confederation	Joseph Howe	18	7.92%
Independent	–	0	0.65%
Independent Liberal	–	0	0.39%
Unknown^{3}	–	0	33.84%
Total		180	100.00%
Source: Library of Parliament – ParlInfo: General Election (1867-08-07 – 1867-09-20)

^{1} Prime Minister when election was called; Prime Minister after the election.
^{2} Party structure had not yet emerged. George Brown of Ontario was the unofficial leader of the Liberal groupings.
^{3} Election returns in 1867 did not require candidates to declare party affiliation. Large numbers of candidates did not list a party affiliation.

=== Dominion election, 1872 ===
The 1872 election was closely fought. Macdonald was returned to office, albeit with a reduced majority. An election financing scandal arose shortly after the election, with allegations that Macdonald and the Conservatives had accepted bribes in return for granting the contract for the trans-Canadian railroad to the first Canadian Pacific Railway company of Hugh Allan. As a result of the scandal, Macdonald and his government was forced to resign in late 1873. The Governor-General, Lord Dufferin, appointed Alexander Mackenzie, the leader of the Liberals, as prime minister. Mackenzie called an election in early 1874.

Canadian Federal Election, 1872 – Parties, Leaders, Seats Won and Popular Vote
Party	Leaders	Seats Won	Popular Vote
Conservative	Sir John A. Macdonald^{1}	63	25.8%
Liberal-Conservative	Sir John A. Macdonald^{1}	36	12.9%
Liberal	None^{2}	95	34.7%
Independent Liberal	–	2	1.6%
Independent Conservative	–	2	0.7%
Independent	–	1	1.6%
Conservative Labour	–	1	0.5%
Unknown^{3}	–	0	22.2%
Total		180	100.00%
Source: Library of Parliament – History of Federal Ridings since 1867

^{1} Prime Minister when election was called; Prime Minister after the election.
^{2} Party structure had not yet emerged. Edward Blake of Ontario was the unofficial leader of the Liberal groupings.
^{3} Election returns in 1872 did not require candidates to declare party affiliation. Large numbers of candidates did not list a party affiliation.

=== Dominion election, 1874 ===
Prime Minister Mackenzie formed his government in late 1873, after the fall of the Macdonald government in late 1873. Mackenzie called the general election in early 1874. He won a majority and was confirmed in office. Macdonald retained the support of the Conservatives and became the Leader of the Opposition. The 1874 election was the only general election Macdonald lost.

Canadian Federal Election, 1874 – Parties, Leaders, Seats Won and Popular Vote
Party	Leaders	Seats Won	Popular Vote
Liberal	Alexander Mackenzie^{1}	129	39.5%
Conservative	Sir John A. Macdonald^{2}	39	17.7%
Liberal-Conservative	Sir John A. Macdonald^{2}	26	12.4%
Independent Liberal	–	5	2.0%
Independent	–	4	3.2%
Independent Conservative	–	3	0.7%
Conservative Labour	–	0	0.5%
Unknown^{3}	–	0	24.0%
Total		206	100.00%
Source: Library of Parliament – History of Federal Ridings since 1867

^{1} Prime Minister when election was called; Prime Minister after the election.
^{2} Leader of the Opposition when election was called; Leader of the Opposition after the election.
^{3} Election returns in 1874 did not require candidates to declare party affiliation. Large numbers of candidates did not list a party affiliation.

=== Dominion election, 1878 ===
In the 1878 election, Macdonald and the Conservatives were returned to government, defeating Alexander Mackenzie and the Liberals.

Canadian Federal Election, 1878 – Parties, Leaders, Seats Won and Popular Vote
Party	Leaders	Seats Won	Popular Vote
Conservative	Sir John A. Macdonald^{1}	85	26.3%
Liberal-Conservative	Sir John A. Macdonald^{1}	49	15.8%
Liberal	Alexander Mackenzie^{2}	63	33.0%
Independent	–	5	2.7%
Independent Conservative	–	2	0.2%
Independent Liberal	–	1	1.0%
Nationalist Conservative	–	1	0.1%
Unknown^{3}	–	0	20.9%
Total		206	100.0%
Source: Library of Parliament – History of Federal Ridings since 1867

^{1} Leader of the Opposition when election was called; Prime Minister after the election.
^{2} Prime Minister when election was called; Leader of the Opposition after the election.
^{3} Election returns in 1878 did not require candidates to declare party affiliation. Large numbers of candidates did not list a party affiliation.

=== Dominion election, 1882 ===
Macdonald and the Conservatives were maintained in power by the 1882 election. Macdonald won his fourth majority government, defeating the Liberals, now led by Edward Blake.

Canadian Federal Election, 1882 – Parties, Leaders, Seats Won and Popular Vote
Party	Leaders	Seats Won	Popular Vote
Conservative	Sir John A. Macdonald^{1}	94	27.8%
Liberal-Conservative	Sir John A. Macdonald^{1}	39	12.6%
Liberal	Edward Blake^{2}	73	31.1%
Independent Liberal	–	2	1.1%
Independent	–	1	1.6%
Nationalist Conservative	–	1	0.2%
Independent Conservative	–	1	0.2%
Unknown^{3}	–	0	25.4%
Total		211	100.0%
Source: Library of Parliament – History of Federal Ridings since 1867

^{1} Prime Minister when election was called; Prime Minister after the election.
^{2} Leader of the Opposition when election was called; Leader of the Opposition after the election.
^{3} Election returns in 1882 did not require candidates to declare party affiliation. Large numbers of candidates did not list a party affiliation.

=== Dominion election, 1887 ===
Macdonald and the Conservatives were maintained in power by the 1887 election. Macdonald won his fifth majority government, defeating the Liberals, again led by Edward Blake. One notable feature of the election was the drop in Quebec seats held by the Conservatives, following the execution of Louis Riel two years earlier.

Canadian Federal Election, 1887 – Parties, Leaders, Seats Won and Popular Vote
Party	Leaders	Seats Won	Popular Vote
Conservative	Sir John A. Macdonald^{1}	96	40.2%
Liberal-Conservative	Sir John A. Macdonald^{1}	27	7.3%
Liberal	Edward Blake^{2}	79	43.1%
Independent Liberal	–	6	2.2%
Independent Conservative	–	3	1.6%
Nationalist Conservative	–	2	0.5%
Independent	–	1	1.2%
Nationalist	–	1	0.7%
Unknown^{3}	–	0	3.3%
Total		215	100.0%
Source: Library of Parliament – History of Federal Ridings since 1867

^{1} Prime Minister when election was called; Prime Minister after the election.
^{2} Leader of the Opposition when election was called; Leader of the Opposition after the election.
^{3} Election returns in 1887 did not require candidates to declare party affiliation. Many candidates did not list a party affiliation.

=== Dominion election, 1891 ===
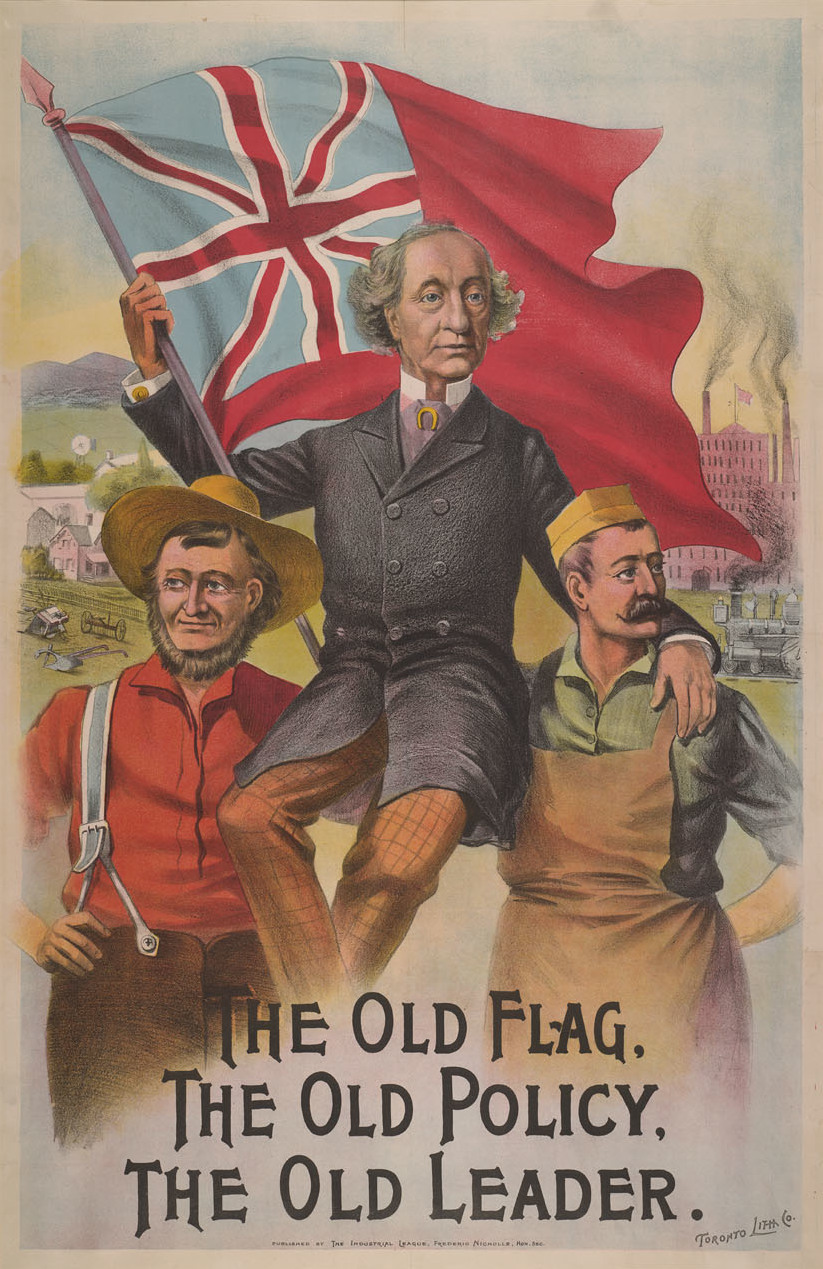
Election poster from Macdonald's last election.

The 1891 election was Macdonald's last. Macdonald, aged 76, again led the Conservatives to victory, his sixth, albeit with a reduced majority. His opponent in the 1891 election was Wilfrid Laurier, the new leader of the Liberals. Macdonald died three months after the election.

Canadian Federal Election, 1891 – Parties, Leaders, Seats Won and Popular Vote
Party	Leaders	Seats Won	Popular Vote
Conservative	Sir John A. Macdonald^{1}	97	43.0%
Liberal-Conservative	Sir John A. Macdonald^{1}	20	5.6%
Liberal	Wilfrid Laurier^{2}	90	45.2%
Independent Conservative	–	3	1.9%
Independent	–	2	0.8%
Independent Liberal	–	1	0.7%
Nationalist Conservative	–	1	0.2%
Nationalist	–	1	0.0%^{3}
Equal Rights	–	0	0.3%
Progressive	–	0	0.1%
Unknown^{4}	–	0	2.2%
Total		215	100.0%
Source: Library of Parliament – History of Federal Ridings since 1867

^{1} Prime Minister when election was called; Prime Minister after the election.
^{2} Leader of the Opposition when election was called; Leader of the Opposition after the election.
^{3} Acclaimed.
^{4} Election returns in 1887 did not require candidates to declare party affiliation. Many candidates did not list a party affiliation.

== Local constituency elections, 1867 to 1891 ==
Macdonald stood for election to the House of Commons twelve times, in three different provinces (British Columbia, Manitoba and Ontario), in five different ridings. He was elected eleven times and defeated once.

=== 1867 election: Kingston ===
Having been Premier of the Province of Canada for much of the previous decade, Macdonald being contested by Dr. John Stewart, who stood simultaneously as the provincial candidate against Maxwell Strange caused much annoyance to his supporters.

1867 Canadian federal election: Kingston
Party	Candidate	Votes	%
Liberal–Conservative	John A. Macdonald	735	83.8%
Unknown	John Stewart	142	16.2%
Total		877	
Source(s) Library of Parliament – History of Federal Ridings since 1867: Kingston

=== 1872 election: Kingston ===
While the final tallies were not close, the election was a close call. Macdonald had left the tending of his partisan political affairs to his former law student and then law partner Alexander Campbell since before confederation, and made him a senator upon confederation and entrusted him with a wide range of political functions including managing the Conservative Association in Kingston. As this election campaign was underway, Campbell actually summoned Macdonald to return to Kington to campaign as he felt the district was in danger. Accounts unearthed in later years portray Campbell as having directed the prime minister’s re-election in great detail, from arranging major items such as patronage positions for key supporters or cash to pay shadowy operatives, to tedious ones as arrangement for the return to Kingston of voters employed out of town.

1872 Canadian federal election: Kingston
Party	Candidate	Votes	%
Liberal–Conservative	John A. Macdonald (incumbent)	735	54.9%
Unknown	John Carruthers	604	45.1%
Total		1,339	
Source(s) Library of Parliament – History of Federal Ridings since 1867: Kingston

=== 1874 election and by-election: Kingston ===
The 1874 election saw the largest number of returned MPs being unseated by court in history. In total sixty-three elected MPs were unseated due to corrupted election practice by their agents. Macdonald's election in Kingston was one such cases. The petition against Macdonald's election was brought forward by the eccentric Dr. Stewart who stood against Macdonald in 1867. In the court proceedings that unseated Macdonald, Chief Justice William Buell Richards found Campbell as a lawyer, and successful businessman, to have been recklessly indifferent to the likely consequence of handing out money to unsavory operatives without restricting their use. Campbell's role as campaign manager however also allowed the Chief Justice to accept Macdonald's claim of ignorance to what would be reasonable amounts for campaign expenses while in full knowledge of the large sum of money being raised and spent for re-election, thus shielded Macdonald from personal liability. Accordingly, Macdonald was unseated, but was spared of more serious sanctions.

1874 Canadian federal election: Kingston
Party	Candidate	Votes	%
Liberal–Conservative	John A. Macdonald (incumbent)	839	51.2%
Liberal	John Carruthers	801	48.8%
Total		1,640	
Source: lop.parl.ca Carruthers was formally nominated by the Liberal (Reform) Party ("Kingston: Nomination of a Reform Candidate MR. JOHN CARRUTHERS SELECTED". The Globe. Toronto, ON. January 12, 1874. p. 1.)

Canadian federal by-election, 29 December 1874: Kingston On Macdonald's election being declared void on 21 November
Party	Candidate	Votes	%
Liberal–Conservative	John A. Macdonald (incumbent)	889	50.5%
Liberal	John Carruthers	872	49.5%
Total		1,761	
Source: lop.parl.ca Carruthers was formally nominated by the Liberal (Reform) Party ("Kingston: Nomination of a Reform Candidate MR. JOHN CARRUTHERS SELECTED". The Globe. Toronto, ON. January 12, 1874. p. 1.)

=== 1878 election: Kingston, Victoria & Marquette ===
Macdonald stood for election in three different constituencies at the 1878 general election, as was permitted at that time: Kingston in Ontario; Victoria in British Columbia; and Marquette in Manitoba. Given the controversies and the small margins of victory from preceding elections, the risk of Macdonald losing locally in Kingston was apparent, leading to him being placed in ballots of other electoral districts as backup. He was elected in Victoria and acclaimed in Marquette, but was defeated in Kingston, his only loss at the constituency level. Macdonald chose to sit as the Member of Parliament from Victoria.

The repudiation by the constituents he had represented since 1844 and the ringing endorsements by voters of a far flung district he did not set foot in was fairly logical and both outcome could be explained by the Pacific Scandal and led to Macdonald's ouster just four years earlier. Many of his constituents in Kingston had first hand experience with the corruption highlighted by the scandal, some even as beneficiary. For voters in Victoria however, the scandal highlight his government's seal in building the railway that would connect them to central Canada. In urging voters to cast their ballots for Macdonald and his running mate Mr. Davies, the Victoria Daily Colonist devoted its entire election day issue on praising Macdonald's greatness while diminishing the incumbent Liberal MP, the former provincial premier Amor De Cosmos with commentary ranging from serious policy critique to petty belittling. Macdonald and De Cosmos were returned, with Macdonald far ahead in first place while De Cosmos a small margin ahead of the third place Davies. Though Macdonald did not set foot in Victoria even once while he was the city's member of parliament. The citizen of Victoria would have to wait till 1886 to meet the premier they voted for enthusiastically, when he rode on the long promised railroad to the city.

While the general election date was September 17, balloting for the two western provinces and the two Northern Ontario ridings were held later. Balloting in British Columbia did not take place until October 21. Since the incoming Macdonald ministry was formed on October 17, the delay of balloting in British Columbia provided an excuse for Macdonald to bypass a ministerial by-election, as voters in Victoria cast their ballots fully aware of their endorsement of a ministerial candidate. The position was endorsed by the parliamentary librarian Alpheus Todd, an authoritative constitutional scholar, and was unchallenged.

While the loss was foreseeable, the magnitude of the repudiation by the constituents he had represented since 1844 was still extraordinary. Given that the 1878 election returned Macdonald and his Conservative party to office with a majority mandate, Macdonald's defeat in Kingston was of historical significance. It was:

- the first (of six) instance of either the incumbent or incoming Prime Minister losing their seat/local contest (this occurred again in 1921 and 1926 to Arthur Meighen, in 1925 and 1945 to William Lyon Mackenzie King, and in 1993 to Kim Campbell)
- the first (of three) instance of the Prime Minister following the general election in question losing their seat/local contest (1925 and 1945 being the other two)
- the first instance (of two) of the leader of the party winning the most seat losing their seat/local contest (1945 being the other)
- the only instance of the leader of the party winning a majority mandate losing their seat/local contest (Note: There were other instances of this at the provincial level, such as Ontario Premier George Drew local defeat in High Park in 1948, and British Columbia Premier Christy Clark's local defeat in Vancouver-Point Grey in 2013. They were however both incumbent premiers, while Macdonald in 1878 was the victorious challenger.)

1878 Canadian federal election: Kingston
Party	Candidate	Votes	%
Liberal	Alexander Gunn	991	53.7%
Liberal–Conservative	John A. Macdonald (incumbent)	847	45.9%
Unknown	John Stewart	6	0.3%
Total		1,844	
Balloting in British Columbia held on October 21 (general election date was September 17)
Library of Parliament – History of Federal Ridings since 1867: Kingston

1878 Canadian federal election: Victoria, British Columbia
Party	Candidate	Votes	Elected
Liberal–Conservative	John A. Macdonald	896	✓
Liberal	Amor De Cosmos (incumbent)	538	✓
Unknown	J.P. Davies	480	
Source(s) Library of Parliament – History of Federal Ridings since 1867: Victoria

1878 Canadian federal election: Marquette
Party	Candidate	Votes
Liberal–Conservative	John A. Macdonald	acclaimed
Source(s) Library of Parliament – History of Federal Ridings since 1867: Marquette

=== 1882 election: Carleton & Lennox ===
Macdonald stood for election in two different constituencies at the 1882 general election, as was permitted at that time: Carleton, Ontario and Lennox, Ontario. He was elected in both ridings but chose to sit as the Member of Parliament for Carleton. His election in Lennox was subsequently set aside for election irregularities.

1882 Canadian federal election: Carleton, Ontario
Party	Candidate	Votes	%
Liberal–Conservative	John A. Macdonald	1,185	48.75
Independent Conservative	John May	629	25.87
Liberal	Erskine Henry Bronson	617	25.38
Total valid votes		2,431	
Source(s) Library of Parliament – History of Federal Ridings since 1867: Carleton

1882 Canadian federal election: Lennox
Party	Candidate	Votes	%
Liberal–Conservative	John A. Macdonald	1,492	53.6%
Liberal	David Wright Allison	1,292	46.4%
Total		2,784	
Source(s) Library of Parliament – History of Federal Ridings since 1867: Lennox

=== 1887 election: Kingston & Carleton ===
Macdonald stood for election in two different constituencies at the 1887 general election, as was permitted at that time: Kingston, Ontario and Lennox, Ontario. He was elected in both ridings but chose to sit as the Member of Parliament for Kingston.

1887 Canadian federal election: Kingston
Party	Candidate	Votes	%
Liberal–Conservative	John A. Macdonald	1,368	50.3%
Liberal	Alexander Gunn (incumbent)	1,351	49.7%
Total		2,719	
Source(s) Library of Parliament – History of Federal Ridings since 1867: Kingston

1887 Canadian federal election: Carleton, Ontario
Party	Candidate	Votes	%
Liberal–Conservative	John A. Macdonald (incumbent)	1,691	73.62
Liberal	John K. Stewart	606	26.38
Total valid votes		2,297	
Source(s) Library of Parliament – History of Federal Ridings since 1867: Carleton

=== 1891 election: Kingston ===
Macdonald stood for election in Kingston, Ontario and was re-elected. It was his last election. He died three months after the election.

1891 Canadian federal election: Kingston
Party	Candidate	Votes	%
Liberal–Conservative	John A. Macdonald (incumbent)	1,784	57.3%
Liberal	Alexander Gunn	1,301	41.8%
Unknown	Major Edwards	29	0.9%
Total		3,114	
Source(s) Library of Parliament – History of Federal Ridings since 1867: Kingston

== Province of Canada general elections, 1844–1867 ==
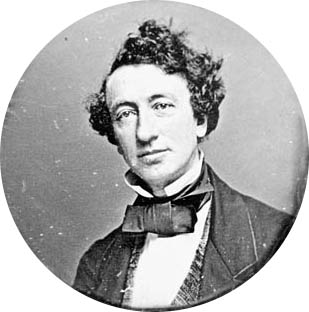
Macdonald around 1850.

Macdonald was elected to the Legislative Assembly of the Province of Canada seven times, in the provincial general elections of 1844, 1848, 1852, 1854, 1858, 1861 and 1863, for a total of 23 years in the Legislative Assembly. Throughout this period, he represented the riding of Kingston, Canada West, initially as a Conservative (1844–1858), and then as a Liberal-Conservative (1858–1867).

Macdonald served three terms as joint premier for the Province of Canada: 1856–1858; 1858–1862; and 1864–1867. He was the longest-serving joint premier, with a total time in office of 9 years and 27 days.

== Municipal election: Kingston, 1843 ==
Macdonald was elected once as alderman for the Town of Kingston.

Kingston Municipal Election, March 29, 1843: Kingston: Fourth Ward
Party	Candidate	Popular Vote	%
Unknown	Yes John A. Macdonald	156	78.4%
Unknown	Colonel Jackson	43	21.6%
Total		199	100.0%
Source: The Man Who Made Us: The Life and Times of Sir John A. Macdonald

Yes Elected.

== See also ==
- Electoral history of Alexander Mackenzie – Macdonald's principal opponent in two general elections, with whom he alternated as prime minister.
- Electoral history of John Abbott – Macdonald's successor as leader of the Conservative Party and as prime minister.
