= List of Queen's University people =

The following is a list of notable alumni, faculty and affiliates of Queen's University at Kingston in Kingston, Ontario, Canada. The list includes notable academics, artists, businesspeople, professionals, and athletes.

== Notable Queen's alumni ==
=== Academic leaders ===
- Emajuddin Ahamed – political scientist, author, educationist and former vice-chancellor of the University of Dhaka
- John Hall Archer – first president of the University of Regina
- Herbert Basser – theologian, Harvard Starr Fellow
- Vijay Bhargava – researcher
- David Card – economist, winner of Nobel Prize in Economics and John Bates Clark Medal
- George Ramsay Cook – Canadian historian
- Beverley Diamond – pianist and feminist ethnomusicologist
- Herb Emery – economist
- Alfred Fitzpatrick – founder of United for Literacy
- William Thomson Newnham – first president of Seneca College, 1967–1984
- Frits Pannekoek (PhD 1974) – president of Athabasca University
- David Siderovski – professor and chair of Pharmacology & Neuroscience at University of North Texas Health Science Center; winner of ASPET John J. Abel Award
- Robert Sutherland – first person of colour to graduate from a Canadian university, and first black lawyer in British North America
- Shirley M. Tilghman (BSc 1968) – president of Princeton University, member of the board of directors of Google

=== Actors, film, and media ===
- Scott Anderson – CanWest MediaWorks senior vice-president, content; former editor-in-chief of the Ottawa Citizen
- Emily Andras – television screenwriter, showrunner, and producer
- Dean Armstrong – actor
- Ashleigh Banfield – CNN news anchor
- Rachel Blanchard – actress
- Kristian Bruun – actor
- Greg Bryk – actor
- Nicholas Campbell – actor
- Tom Cavanagh – actor, played title character in sitcom Ed
- Sarita Choudhury – actress
- Brendan Connor – television broadcaster, Al Jazeera International
- Wendy Crewson – actress
- Chris Cuthbert – TSN sportscaster
- Lyse Doucet – BBC's chief international correspondent
- Lisa Eichhorn – actress
- Sally Gifford – host on CBC's national kids' show, The X
- Lorne Greene (BA'37, LLD'71) – actor
- Amy Lalonde – actress, also played an actress who went to Queen's Business School in Wild Roses
- Linda Liao (廖語晴) – singer/actress
- Michelle MacLaren – TV series director
- Molly McGlynn – film and television director and screenwriter
- Vanessa Morgan – actress
- Northernlion, real name Ryan Letourneau – Twitch streamer and YouTuber
- Anna Olson – chef and television presenter
- Evanka Osmak – SportsNet broadcaster
- Italia Ricci – actress
- Shelagh Rogers – CBC broadcaster
- Ted Simonett – actor
- Jeffrey Simpson – political columnist for The Globe and Mail
- Rachel Skarsten – actress
- Rod Smith – TSN sportscaster
- Celine Song – filmmaker
- John Stackhouse – former editor, The Globe and Mail
- Julie Stewart-Binks – sports broadcaster, ESPN
- Katie Uhlmann – actress and producer
- Ali Velshi – former Report on Business Television and current CNN business reporter
- Sandy Webster – actor
- Nancy Wilson – CBC journalist
- Gema Zamprogna – actor

=== Business people ===
- Alfred Bader (B.Sc. 1945, B.A. 1946, M.Sc. 1947) – founder of Sigma-Aldrich Corporation, and donor of 15th-century Herstmonceux Castle
- Geoffrey Ballard – founder of Ballard Power Systems
- Robert Buchan – founder and former president and CEO of Kinross Gold
- Derek Burney (B.A. 1962, M.A. 1964) – former president and CEO of Bell Canada, current member of the board of directors of CanWest Global Communications, Quebecor World Inc. and Shell Canada
- Donald J. Carty – former chairman and CEO of AMR Corporation, the parent company of American Airlines
- Gururaj Deshpande – founder of Sycamore Networks
- David A. Dodge – former governor of the Bank of Canada, and chancellor of Queen's, effective July 1, 2008
- Frances Donald – youngest chief economist for a major financial services firm in Canada (Manulife)
- Don Drummond (MA, LLD) – former senior vice-president and chief economist of TD Bank Financial Group and Donald Matthews Faculty Fellowship on Global Public Policy
- Mel Goodes – former chairman and CEO of the Warner-Lambert Company
- Stephen K. Gunn – CEO and co-founder of Sleep Country Canada
- Brian Hill – founder and executive chair of Aritzia
- F. C. Kohli – former CEO of Tata Consultancy Services (TCS)
- Leonard Lee (B.A. 1963) – founder of Lee Valley Tools
- Tiff Macklem (B.A 1983) – governor of the Bank of Canada
- Michael MacMillan – chairman and co-founder of Alliance Atlantis
- Earle McLaughlin – former president and CEO of the Royal Bank of Canada
- Seaton McLean – co-founder of Atlantis Films (now Alliance Atlantis)
- Alexander C. Monteith – senior vice-president of the Westinghouse Electric Corporation and recipient of the IEEE Edison Medal
- Elon Musk – founder, CEO, and chief engineer at SpaceX; early stage investor, CEO, and product architect of Tesla, Inc. (left after 2 years)
- Kimbal Musk – South African restaurateur, chef, and entrepreneur
- Nik Nanos – founder, Nanos Research
- Gord Nixon (BComm 1979) – president and CEO of the Royal Bank of Canada
- Douglas Peters (BComm 1963) – banker, economist and politician
- Stephen Poloz – governor of the Bank of Canada
- Stephen Quinn – senior vice president, Wal-Mart Inc, Bentonville, Arkansas
- David Radler (MBA 1967) – former president of Ravelston Corporation (which owned Argus Corporation which controlled Hollinger International), cooperating with the prosecution in the Conrad Black racketeering case
- Michele Romanow (BScEng 2007, MBA 2008) – cast member on Dragons' Den, co-founder of Clearbanc
- Michael Serbinis (B.S.) – president and CEO of Kobo Inc.
- Chris Viehbacher – CEO of Sanofi
- Mark Wiseman – president and CEO of Canada Pension Plan Investment Board

=== Literature and the arts ===
- Jill Barber – singer-songwriter
- Matthew Barber – singer-songwriter
- Janet Cardiff – artist
- Lina Chartrand (B.A.) – writer
- George Elliott Clarke (Ph.D. 1993) – writer and academic
- Jim Cuddy – lead singer of Blue Rodeo
- Kalli Dakos – children's poet and teacher
- Robertson Davies, CC – author and playwright
- Gord Downie – lead singer of band The Tragically Hip
- Dawn Dumont – author
- Omar El Akkad - novelist and journalist
- Priscilla Galloway – author
- Sarah Harmer – singer-songwriter
- Frank Ll. Harrison – musicologist
- Steven Heighton – author
- Elena Juatco – singer and Canadian Idol season 2 top 10 contestant
- Irene Luxbacher – artist, author and illustrator
- Cyndra MacDowall – artist and photographer
- Jay Malinowski (B.A. 2004) – vocalist and guitarist for the Canadian band Bedouin Soundclash
- Paul Nicholas Mason – author
- Emily Julian McManus (M.A., 1894) – poet, author, and educator
- Jean Mills – children's author
- Alexander Muir (B.A. 1851) – composer of "The Maple Leaf Forever"
- Justine Musk – author
- Michael Ondaatje (M.A. 1967) – author
- Neil Pasricha – speaker, author and writer of 1000 Awesome Things
- Joseph Petric – musician
- Ciara Phillips (BFA 2000) – artist
- Maynard Plant – vocalist and guitarist for the Japanese band Monkey Majik
- Iain Reid (B.A. 2004) – novelist, author of I'm Thinking of Ending Things
- Baņuta Rubess (B.A., honours 1977) – playwright and theatre director
- Eon Sinclair (B.A. 2004) – bassist for Canadian band Bedouin Soundclash
- Gord Sinclair – bassist of The Tragically Hip
- Russell Smith – author and The Globe and Mail columnist
- Moez Surani – author
- Timothy Taylor – author
- Judith Thompson – playwright
- Chris Turner – author
- Cynthia Johnston Turner – conductor

=== Military ===
- John Weir Foote (B.A. 1933) – awarded the Victoria Cross for service during the Dieppe Raid in World War II
- Mark Norman (Bachelor of Economics) – vice-admiral, commander of RCN
- Ken Watkin (Bachelor of Laws and Master of Laws) – brigadier general and judge advocate general of the Canadian Forces

=== Political leaders ===
- William Aberhart – former premier of Alberta
- Rohit Aggarwala – commissioner of the New York City Department of Environmental Protection
- John Baird (B.A. 1992) – former minister of the Environment and former Foreign Affairs Minister
- Isabel Bassett – former broadcaster and provincial cabinet minister
- Michael Breaugh – former member of Parliament and member of Provincial Parliament
- Derek Burney (B.A. 1962, M.A. 1964) – former Canadian ambassador to the Korea, Japan, and the United States
- Diana Buttu – Palestinian legal advisor
- Sean Conway – director of the Institute of Intergovernmental Relations (Queen's University), former Ontario cabinet minister and MPP
- Thomas Cromwell (B.Mus. 1973, Law 1976) – Supreme Court justice
- John Crosbie – former minister of Finance
- Paul Dewar – educator, aid worker and former member of Parliament
- David Emerson (Ph.D. 1975) – former minister of International Trade and minister for the Pacific Gateway and the Vancouver-Whistler Olympics
- Robert Fowler – Canadian diplomat
- Godwin Friday (Ph.D. 1989) – fifth prime minister of Saint Vincent and the Grenadines
- Jean-Denis Garon (Ph.D. 2012) – scholar and politician, member of Parliament for Mirabel
- John Gerretsen – Ontario MPP, former mayor of Kingston, Ontario cabinet minister
- Sir Kenneth O. Hall – governor general of Jamaica
- James R.M. Harris – author and politician, former leader of the Green Party of Canada
- Susan Holt (Artsci 1999 Chemistry, Artsci 2000 Economics) – premier of New Brunswick
- Yolande James (LL.B. 2003) – lawyer and politician, Quebec's first black cabinet minister
- Pauline Jewett – university administrator and federal member of Parliament
- David Lloyd Johnston (LL.B. 1966) – president of the University of Waterloo, principal of McGill University, dean of the School of Law at the University of Western Ontario, and 28th governor general of Canada
- Donald C. MacDonald – former Ontario MPP and leader of the Ontario CCF/NDP (1953–1970)
- Nicolas Marceau (Ph.D. 1992) – scholar and politician, former member of Quebec National Assembly and Quebec minister of finance (2012–2014)
- John Matheson – "midwife of the Canadian flag" and former MP for Leeds, judge in Ottawa-Carlton
- Lindsay Mathyssen – member of Parliament
- Frank McKenna – former Canadian ambassador to the United States and former premier of New Brunswick
- Peter Milliken (B.A. 1968) – speaker of the House of Commons
- Tim Murphy – chief of staff of the Canadian Prime Minister's Office under Paul Martin's government
- Robert Nicholson (B.A. 1975) – minister of National Defence of Canada
- Alison Redford (attended for two years, 1983–1985) –14th premier of Alberta (2011–2014)
- Rathika Sitsabaiesan (M.I.R. 2007) – member of Parliament for Scarborough-Rouge River (2011–2015)
- George Spotton (B.A. 1895) – member of the House of Commons
- Karen Stintz – Toronto municipal councillor and chair of the TTC (2010–2014)
- Ross Thatcher – 9th premier of Saskatchewan (1964–1971)
- Kathleen Wynne (B.A.) – 25th premier of Ontario (2013–2018)

=== Scientists ===
- Walter A. Bell B.Sc. – geologist and paleontologist
- Mustapha Ishak Boushaki (PhD 2002) – theoretical physicist
- Norman L. Bowen B.Sc., M.Sc. – chemical geologist
- Bill Buxton B.Mus. (1973) – computer scientist and human-computer interaction pioneer
- Barbara Cade-Menun – research scientist
- Adolfo J. de Bold – O.C. Ph.D. – emeritus professor at University of Ottawa; discovered heart hormones
- Anna L. Brown BSc – physician
- Charles Rea Dickson M.D. C.M. (1880) – radiologist, electrotherapist, co-founder of CNIB Foundation
- Charles LeGeyt Fortescue – electrical engineer
- Christine Friedenreich – cancer epidemiologist
- James Edwin Hawley (BSc 1918, MSc 1920) – head of Geological Sciences Department (1929–1962)
- Kenneth E. Iverson (BSc 1951) – inventor of the APL programming language, Turing Award laureate
- Erin Johnson (PhD 2008) – theoretical chemist
- Leon Katz, B.Sc. MSc. – professor at University of Saskatchewan, founder of Saskatchewan Accelerator Laboratory, member of the Order of Canada
- Venkatesh K. R. Kodur Ph.D. – University Distinguished Professor at Michigan State University and pioneer in structural fire engineering
- Thomas Edvard Krogh M.Sc. (Geology) – geochronologist and curator of the Royal Ontario Museum
- Harriet MacMillan (M.D., 1982) – medical academic and scientist
- Margaret McKellar M.D. (1890), medical missionary
- J. F. A. McManus M.D. (1938) – pathologist
- Derek Muller (BSc 2004) – physics educator, creator and writer-host of Veritasium (YouTube channel)
- Anthony J. Naldrett – University of Toronto emeritus professor, geologist
- Kathleen I. Pritchard MD 1971 – head of oncology at Sunnybrook Health Sciences Centre, Toronto
- Ian Rae B.Sc. (Eng.) (1980) – co-developer of CorelDraw software
- Carolyn Relf (BSc 1984, PhD 1992) – geologist
- Jane Stewart (B.A. 1956) – neuroscientist
- Julielynn Wong (M.D.) – physician, scientist and pilot

=== Sports ===
- Keith Eaman – Canadian football player
- Johnny Evans – quarterback, two time Grey Cup champion
- Dalton Kellett – IndyCar Series racer
- Craig MacTavish (EMBA 2011) – former NHL player, head coach, and hockey operations executive
- Morris Mott – NHL and Canadian National Team hockey player
- Gordon Orlikow (b. 1960) – decathlon, heptathlon, and hurdles competitor, Athletics Canada Chairman, Canadian Olympic Committee member, Korn/Ferry International partner
- George Richardson – Hockey Hall of Fame member, died in World War I
- Mike Schad – former NFL player
- Tessa Virtue (EMBA 2020) – figure skater, multi-Olympic gold medalist
- Carl Voss – NHL player and Hockey Hall of Fame inductee
- Jim Young – first Canadian college football player drafted into the NFL (Minnesota Vikings)

=== Miscellaneous ===
- Robert Arntfield – Canadian intensivist and medical educator
- J. Sidney Bernstein (B.A. 1898) – American lawyer, politician, and judge
- Jock Climie (B.A. 1989, LL.B. 1998) – lawyer, former CFL player, and broadcaster
- J. Douglas Cunningham (B.A., LL.B.) – lawyer and Ontario Superior Court Justice
- Julie Dickson (M.E.) – civil servant
- David A. Dodge (B.A.) – former Bank of Canada governor and current Chancellor of Queen's University
- Virginia Douglas – past president of the Canadian Psychological Association
- Andrew J. Feustel (Ph.D) – geophysicist and NASA astronaut
- barbara findlay (M.A, LL.B.) – lawyer and LGBT rights activist
- Alan B. Gold – former chief justice of Quebec Superior Court; chancellor of Concordia University
- Jared Goodman- Non-Profit Associate Director; Brand Manager
- Karla Homolka – convicted murderer; completed her Queen's Psychology degree while behind bars
- Andrew Kalotay (B.Sc. 1964, M.Sc. 1966) – mathematician, Wall Street financier and chess master
- Martin Kreuzer (post-doc. 1991) – mathematician, professor, and correspondence chess Grandmaster
- James Macleod – militia officer, lawyer, North-West Mounted Police officer, magistrate, judge, and politician
- Andrew McFadyen – patients' rights advocate
- Kim Phuc (honorary degree recipient) – notable through the picture of her depicted during the Vietnam War
- Jack Pickup – physician, the "flying doctor of British Columbia"
- David Smart (B.A. 1994) – Canadian champion basketball coach
- Prince Takamado of Japan
- Ali Velshi – CNN business analyst

== Notable faculty and affiliates ==
In addition to the following notable faculty members, Sir Sandford Fleming, former Prime Minister of Canada Sir Robert Laird Borden, and former governor general of Canada Roland Michener have all served as chancellor of the university, though this is a non-academic role.

- Donald Akenson – History
- Ralph Allen – Art
- W. B. Anderson – classics and Latin
- István Anhalt – Music (Juno Award-winning composer)
- Caroline Baillie – Engineering
- John W. Berry – Psychology
- Robin Boadway – Economics (Member of the Canadian Royal Society, the Order of Canada and CESIfo Distinguished Fellow)
- Janine Brodie – Political Science
- Rosa Bruno-Jofré – History
- Gerald Bull – long-range artillery engineer
- John Burge – Music, (Juno Award-winning composer)
- Meredith Chivers – Psychology
- James Cordy – Computing (ACM Distinguished Scientist and co-inventor of the Turing programming language)
- Thomas Courchene – Economics, Policy studies
- Wendy Craig – Psychology
- Anne Croy – Canada Research Chair, Biomedical and Molecular Sciences
- Lola Cuddy – Psychology
- Richard J. F. Day – Sociology
- Vibert Douglas – Astrophysics
- Jacalyn Duffin – Medical History
- Gabor Fichtinger – Computing (Canada Research Chair, Computer-Integrated Surgery)
- Suzanne Fortier – Chemistry (president of the Natural Sciences and Engineering Research Council (NSERC))
- Elizabeth Goodyear-Grant – Politics
- J. A. W. Gunn – Politics
- James Allen Keast – Biology (ornithologist)
- Tom Kent – Economics
- Audrey Kobayashi – Geography
- Will Kymlicka – Canada Research Chair, Philosophy
- Susan Lederman – Psychology
- William Lederman – Law
- William C. Leggett – Biology (chairman of the Board of the Canada Foundation for Innovation) and former principal of Queen's University (1994–2004)
- A. H. Lightstone – Mathematics
- Clarke Mackey – Film and Media
- James G. MacKinnon – Economics (Fellow of the Econometric Society)
- Art McDonald – Physics (winner of the Herzberg Prize, the Benjamin Franklin Prize in physics, the Nobel Prize in physics and a member of the Order of Canada)
- John McGarry – Politics
- Katherine McKittrick – Gender Studies
- Marjan Mozetich – Music
- M. Ram Murty – Mathematics (Queen's Research Chair)
- Kim Richard Nossal – Politics
- Malcolm Peat – Physiotherapy
- Vernon Quinsey – Psychology
- Kim Renders – Theatre, Gender Studies
- Paulo Ribenboim – Mathematics
- Kai Salomaa – Computer Science
- Bernice Weldon Sargent – Physics
- Sanjay Sharma – Medicine (ophthalmology, epidemiology)
- Bhavin J. Shastri – Neuromorphic photonic computing
- Elizabeth Smith Shortt – Medicine
- Ana Siljak – History
- Duncan G. Sinclair – Medicine
- John P. Smol – Biology (winner of the Herzberg Prize)
- L. S. Stavrianos – History
- Alastair M. Taylor – Geography, Political Studies
- David J. Thomson – Mathematics
- Helen Tiffin – English
- Jennie Kidd Trout – Medicine
- Craig Walker – Drama
- Beatrice Worsley – Computer Science, launched Queen's' new Computer Centre based on an IBM 1620 in 1965
- Noriko Yui – Mathematical Physics

== Principals ==
1. Rev Thomas Liddell (1841–1846)
2. Rev John Machar (1846–1853)
3. Rev James George (acting Principal 1853–1857)
4. Rev John Cook (1857–1859)
5. Rev William Leitch (1859–1864)
6. Rev William Snodgrass (1864–1877)
7. Rev George Monro Grant (1877–1902)
8. Rev Daniel Miner Gordon (1902–1916)
9. Rev Robert Bruce Taylor (1917–1929)
10. Sir William Hamilton Fyfe (1930–1936)
11. Robert Charles Wallace (1936–1951)
12. William Archibald Mackintosh (1951–1961)
13. James Alexander Corry (1961–1968)
14. John James Deutsch (1968–1974)
15. Ronald Lampman Watts (1974–1984)
16. David Chadwick Smith (1984–1994)
17. William Claude Leggett (1994–2004)
18. Karen R. Hitchcock (2004–2008)
19. Thomas R. Williams (2008–2009)
20. Daniel Woolf (2009–2019)
21. Patrick Deane (2019–present)

== Chancellors ==
1. Rev John Cook (1877–1879)
2. Sir Sandford Fleming (1880–1915)
3. James Douglas (1915–1918)
4. Sir Edward Beatty (1918–1923)
5. Sir Robert Laird Borden (1924–1929)
6. James Armstrong Richardson (1929–1939)
7. Charles Avery Dunning (1940–1958)
8. John Bertram Stirling (1960–1973)
9. Roland Michener (1973–1980)
10. Agnes Mccausland Benidickson (1980–1996)
11. Peter Lougheed (1996–2002)
12. A. Charles Baillie (2002–2008)
13. David A. Dodge (2008–2014)
14. Jim Leech (2014–2021)
15. Murray Sinclair (2021–2024)

== Rectors ==
1. Rev S. W. Dyde (1913)
2. James L. Robertson (1916)
3. Brigadier General A. E. Ross (1920)
4. William H. Coverdale (1925)
5. Oscar D. Skelton (1929)
6. R. B. Bennett (1935)
7. Norman McLeod Rogers (1937)
8. The Earl of Athlone (1940)
9. BK Sandwell (1944)
10. Leonard W. Brockington (1947)
11. M. Grattan O'Leary (1968)
12. Richard Alan Broadbent (1969, first student rector)
13. Gary Michael Gannage (1972)
14. Bruce W. Trotter (1974)
15. Morris Chochla (1976)
16. Hugh Christie (1978)
17. Jeremy Freedman (1980)
18. James Harris (1982)
19. Richard Powers (1984)
20. Kelley McKinnon (1986)
21. Charis Kelso (1988)
22. Antoinette Mongillo (1990)
23. David Baar (1992)
24. Peter Gallant (1994)
25. Ian Michael (1996)
26. Michael Kealy (1998)
27. Daniel Sahl (2000)
28. Ahmed "KC" Kayssi (2002)
29. Grant R.A. Bishop (2004)
30. Johsa Marie G. Manzanilla (2006)
31. Leora Jackson (2008)
32. Nick Day (2010)
33. Nick Francis (2011)
34. Mike Young (2014)
35. Cameron Yung (2016)
36. Alexandra da Silva (2018)
37. Sam Hiemstra (2020)
38. Owen Crawford Lem (2022)
39. Niki Boytchuk-Hale (2024)
