= Cataraqui Cemetery =

Historic cemetery in Frontenac County, Ontario, Canada

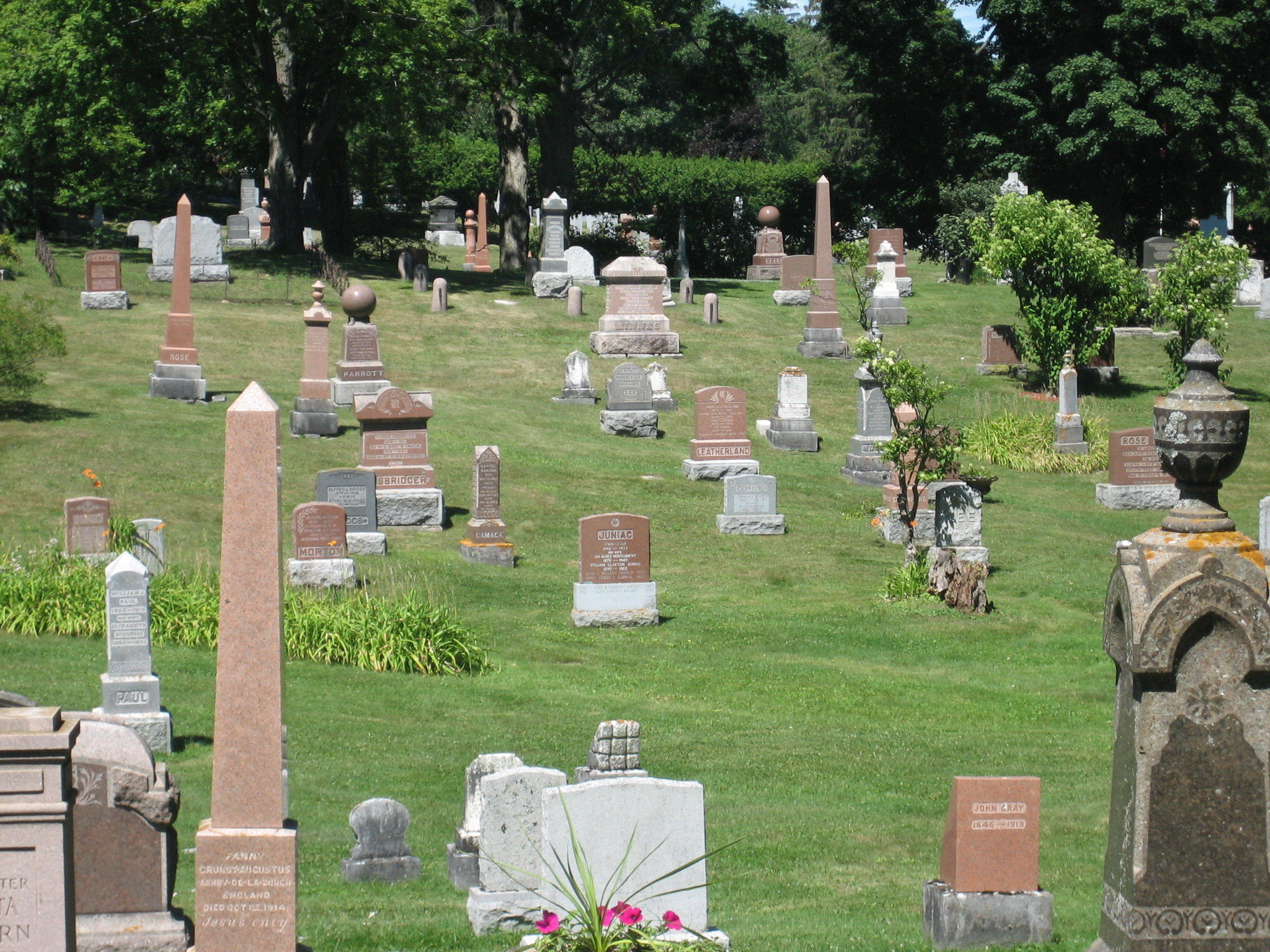
- Cataraqui Cemetery
- Interactive map of Cataraqui Cemetery

Details
- Established: 1850
- Location: 927 Purdy's Mill Road; Kingston, Ontario, Canada
- Coordinates: 44°15′52″N 76°32′28″W
- Size: 91 acres (0.37 km^{2})
- No. of graves: >46,000
- Website: www.cataraquicemetery.ca

National Historic Site of Canada
- Official name: Sir John A. Macdonald Gravesite; National Historic Site of Canada
- Designated: 1938

National Historic Site of Canada
- Official name: Cataraqui Cemetery; National Historic Site of Canada
- Designated: 2011
- Find a Grave: Cataraqui Cemetery

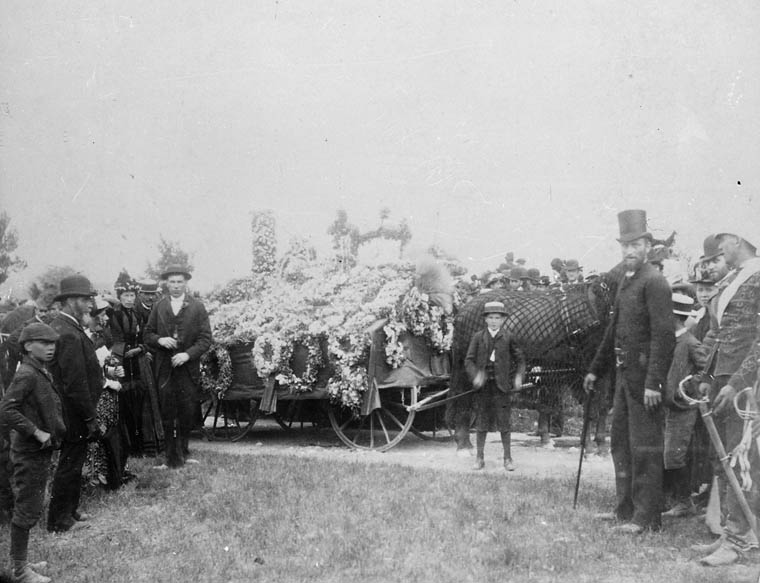
Funeral of John A. Macdonald, Cataraqui Cemetery

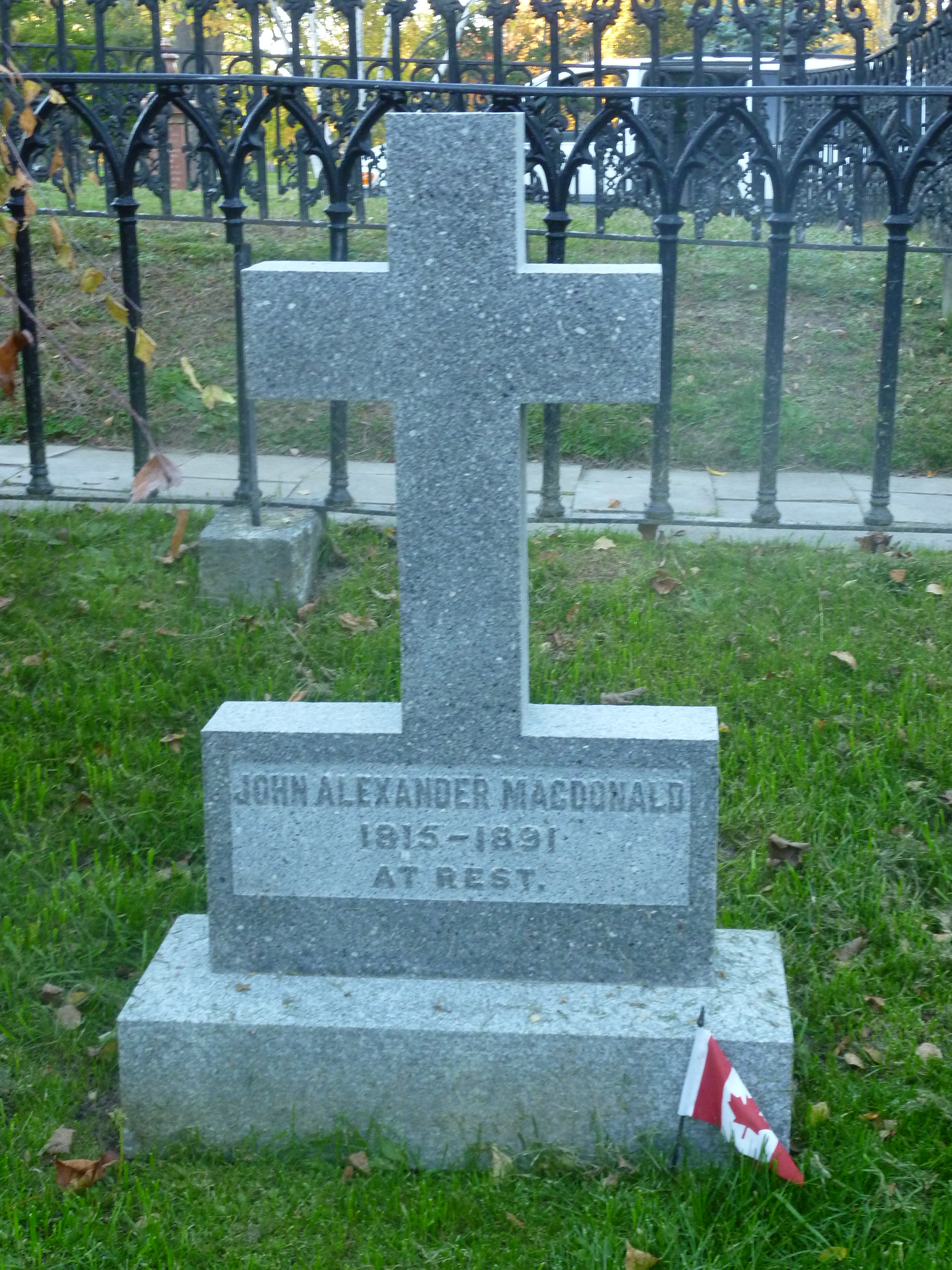
Grave of John Alexander Macdonald

Cataraqui Cemetery is a non-denominational cemetery located in Kingston, Ontario, Canada. Founded in 1850, it predates Canadian Confederation, and continues as an active burial ground. The cemetery is 91 acres in a rural setting with rolling wooded terrain, ponds and watercourses. More than 46,000 individuals are interred within the grounds, and it is the final resting place of many prominent Canadians, including the burial site of Canada's first prime minister, John A. Macdonald. The Macdonald family gravesite, and the cemetery itself, are both designated as National Historic Sites of Canada.

== History ==
The cemetery charter was created during a special act of the Legislative Assembly of the Province of Canada on August 10, 1850. The Cataraqui Cemetery was incorporated as a not-for-profit, non-denominational, and public resting place. Alexander Campbell served as the first president. Architect Frederick Cornell designed the cemetery landscape. Interments increased quickly when the City of Kingston passed a by-law in 1864, preventing burials within the city limits. The gravesite of John A. Macdonald and family plot were recognized as a National Historic Site of Canada on May 19, 1938. Cataraqui Cemetery as a whole was recognized as a National Historic Site of Canada on July 19, 2011.

== Notable interments ==
Cataraqui Cemetery is the final resting place for many notable persons including politicians, businessmen, humanitarians, and authors. The cemetery contains the war graves of 61 service personnel from World War I, and 84 from World War II. Queen's University owns a section that is reserved for interring the remains of those who dedicate their bodies to education and research.

- Leonard Birchall – Royal Canadian Air Force officer
- Thomas Burrowes – Artist and surveyor
- John Counter – First mayor of the City of Kingston
- Alexander Campbell – Father of Confederation, and a former Lieutenant Governor of Ontario
- Wallace Bruce Matthews Carruthers – Founder of the Canadian Signal Corps
- Richard John Cartwright – Businessman and politician
- Dick Cherry – professional ice hockey player
- James Alexander Corry – Academic and principal of Queen's University
- William Coverdale – Architect
- John Creighton – Politician and warden
- John James Deutsch – Economist and principal of Queen's University
- Harriet Dobbs – Artist, writer and humanitarian
- George Monro Grant – Minister and principal of Queen's College
- John Hamilton – Politician and cofounder of Queen's University
- George Airey Kirkpatrick – Politician and Lieutenant Governor of Ontario
- Thomas Kirkpatrick – First mayor of the Town of Kingston
- William Leitch – Scientist and principal of Queen's University.
- Evan MacColl – the poet of Loch Fyne
- John A. Macdonald – First Prime Minister of Canada
- Archibald Cameron Macdonell – Police officer and soldier
- Agnes Maule Machar – Author, poet and social reformer
- John Machar – Principal of Queen's University
- William Archibald Mackintosh – Economist and principal of Queen's University
- Thomas McLeod – Scottish sailor who took part in three expeditions to the South Pole
- James Morton – Politician, and businessman
- Edward John Barker Pense – Politician, and newspaper editor
- Guilford Bevil Reed – Canadian medical researcher
- James Richardson – Businessman, founder of James Richardson and Sons, Limited
- James Sampson – Doctor, politician and a founder of Kingston General Hospital
- Charles Sangster – Poet, fellow of the Royal Society
- David Chadwick Smith – Economist and principal of Queen's University
- Henry Smith – Politician and lawyer
- James T. Sutherland – Soldier, and Hockey Hall of Fame member
- Robert Charles Wallace – Geologist, educator, academic administrator
- Zachary Taylor Wood – Commissioner of the North-West Mounted Police, and Yukon Territory
