= William C. Leggett =

Canadian population biologist (1939–2026)

William C. Leggett CM FRSC
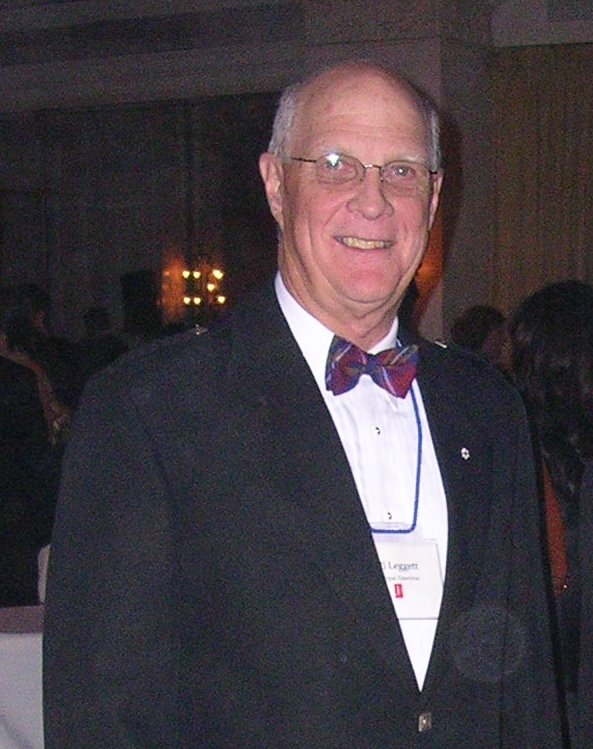
- Leggett in 2006

17th Principal and Vice-Chancellor of Queen's University
- In office August 1, 1994 – June 30, 2004
- Preceded by: David Chadwick Smith
- Succeeded by: Karen R. Hitchcock

Personal details
- Born: William Claude Leggett; June 25, 1939 Orangeville, Ontario, Canada
- Died: February 13, 2026 (aged 86)
- Spouse: Claire Leggett
- Children: 2
- Education: Waterloo University College (now Wilfrid Laurier University) (BA); University of Waterloo (MA); McGill University (PhD)
- Nickname: Bill
- Scientific career
- Fields: Population biology
- Workplaces: Essex Marine Laboratory; McGill University; Queen's University
- Thesis: Studies on the reproductive biology of the American shad. (Alosa Sapidissema, Wilson.) A comparison of populations from four rivers of the Atlantic seaboard (1969)

William C. Leggett CM FRSC (June 25, 1939 – February 13, 2026) was a Canadian population biologist and university administrator who served as the 17th Principal and Vice-Chancellor of Queen's University, Kingston in Canada, from 1994 to 2004, only the second scientist to hold the Principalship. He was previously the Vice Principal (Academic) of McGill University.

== Early life and education ==
Leggett was born on June 25, 1939 in Orangeville, Ontario, where his father owned and ran an automobile repair shop and bowling alley, and was raised in nearby Mono Mills (part of Caledon, Ontario). He went to a one-room school for elementary school, and received his high school education at Orangeville District Secondary School. His interest in athletics led him to Waterloo University College (now Wilfrid Laurier University) in 1958, wishing to become a physical education teacher. In his final year, he took an elective course in biology, which, thanks to the instructor Geoffrey Power, piqued his interest in the subject. After obtaining his BA from Waterloo University College in 1962, Leggett went to the University of Waterloo for a MSc despite his lack of background in science, thanks to Power's persuasion of Waterloo's Dean of Graduate Studies. Leggett focused on fish ecology and graduated in 1965, and at Power's advice, began his PhD at McGill University in zoology, completing in 1969.

== Career ==
Following his PhD, Leggett spent a year at the Essex Marine Laboratory in Essex, Connecticut, before returning to McGill as an assistant professor in the Department of Biology in 1970. He eventually became a full professor in 1979, the Chair of the Department of Biology in 1981, the Dean of Science in 1986, and lastly the Vice-Principal of Academics in 1991.

=== Principalship at Queen's University ===
In October 1993, Queen's University announced the appointment of Leggett as the 17th Principal and Vice-Chancellor, succeeding David Chadwick Smith. He was the second scientist to hold this position since Robert Charles Wallace, who was Principal and Vice-Chancellor between 1936 and 1951. He took the role on August 1, 1994. Leggett was re-appointed in 1998 for a second 5-year term, starting on September 1, 1999.

Leggett's tenure at Queen's saw the completion of a number of new buildings. Academic buildings such as Chernoff Hall (for the Department of Chemistry) and Goodes Hall (for Queen's School of Business, now known as Smith School of Business) opened in 2002, followed by Beamish-Munro Hall (for the Faculty of Engineering Integrated Learning Centre) in 2005. Student residences Watts Hall (originally 23 Albert Street) and Leggett Hall (originally 194 Stuart Street) also opened in 2003, and was respectively renamed in the honor of former Principal and Vice-Chancellor Ronald Lampman Watts and Leggett himself. The 2 buildings were the first student residences to open in 25 years. He also oversaw the opening of the expanded Agnes Etherington Art Centre building in 2000, the opening of the Cancer Research Institute Complex and the new Leonard Hall cafeteria in 2003, and the renovation of Gordon Hall (the old building for the Department of Chemistry), including the demolition of the Frost Wing, throughout his second term of Principalship.

In September 2002, Leggett announced his retirement after his second term. He is currently a professor emeritus and Principal Emeritus of Queen's University.

=== Controversy ===
Leggett's advocacy for the deregulation of tuition fee attracted considerable controversy. Historically, under provincial legislation, Ontario universities were only allowed to increase tuition to a maximum of 2% annually. In 1998, the Government of Ontario led by Premier Mike Harris removed this cap on, or deregulated, the tuition for all professional and graduate degrees in Ontario universities, prompting frustration and protests from medical and law students, including at Queen's. Then next year, the tuition for commerce and engineering programs was also deregulated, and Leggett proposed that the tuition for Arts and Science subjects should be deregulated as well. In response, the Arts and Science Undergraduate Society, the students' union for the Queen's Faculty of Arts and Science, held a referendum where over 90% Arts and Science students rejected tuition deregulation. Leggett, however, continued to advocate for deregulation, outlining his idea in the Pathfinder Proposal submitted to the Ontario government in 2002, and sending representatives to meet with Harris. On January 14, in protest of Leggett's decision, Queen's students occupied his office until January 18, when the Ontario government rejected Queen's proposal. Leggett was unhappy with the province's decision, and announced significant reduction to Queen's budget and that the replacement of teaching staff would be limited to loss by retirement. The issue of tuition deregulation would continue into the tenure of Leggett's successor Karen R. Hitchcock.

== Personal life and death ==
Leggett married Claire Holman in 1964. They had two sons. He died on February 13, 2026, at the age of 86.

== Honors and awards ==
- Fellow of the Royal Society of Canada (1989)
- Fry Medal, Canadian Society of Zoologists (1990)
- Excellence in Fisheries Education Award, American Fisheries Society (1990)
- Oscar E. Sette Award for Outstanding Marine Fishery Biologist, Marine Fisheries Section, American Fisheries Society (1996)
- Award of Excellence, American Fisheries Society (1997)
- Member of the Order of Canada (2001)
- H. Ahlstrom Lifetime Achievement Award, Early Life History Section, American Fisheries Society (2014)

== See also ==
- List of University of Waterloo people

Academic offices
Preceded by David Chadwick Smith	Principal of Queen's University; 1994–2004	Succeeded by Karen R. Hitchcock
