= Kerry Courneya =

Canadian health researcher

Kerry Courneya OC
- Born: 1963 (age 62–63); Peterborough, Ontario

Academic background
- Education: BA, physical education, 1987, MA, physical education, 1989, University of Western Ontario; PhD, Kinesiology, 1992, University of Illinois
- Thesis: An integrated social cognitive model for the prediction of physical activity participation: preliminary development and validation. (1992)

Kerry Stephen Courneya OC (born 1963) is a Canadian kinesiologist. As a Full Professor and Canada Research Chair in Physical Activity and Cancer at the University of Alberta, his research focuses on physical activity after a cancer diagnosis (i.e., exercise oncology).

== Early life and education ==
Courneya was born in Peterborough, Ontario in 1963. He received his Bachelor of Arts degree in physical education from the University of Western Ontario in London, Ontario in 1987 and then completed his Master's degree in Physical Education at the same institution in 1989. He then received his PhD in Kinesiology in 1992 from the University of Illinois.

== Career ==
Upon completing his formal education in 1992, Courneya spent five years as an assistant/associate professor at the University of Calgary before accepting a similar position at the University of Alberta (U of A) in 1997. As a kinesiologist at U of A, Courneya received funding for numerous clinical trials to study cancer patients reactions to exercise during and after cancer therapy. One of his early clinical trials involved trying to determine whether weight training may be of benefit to patients undergoing treatment for prostate cancer. He was among the first researchers to systematically study the field of exercise oncology and demonstrated that physical activity is a safe and effective method for improving fitness and quality of life. He was granted a Canada Research Chair (CRC) in 2004 to fund and continue his research in the field.

In 2007, Courneya published the START trial, a randomized controlled trial comparing aerobic and resistance exercise to usual care in breast cancer patients on chemotherapy. The START trial was the first to show that exercise may improve chemotherapy completion in breast cancer patients. Following this, Courneya published the findings of his Healthy Exercise for Lymphoma Patients (HELP) trial which found that a regimen of aerobic exercise training produced significant improvements in physical functioning and overall quality of life benefits in patients with lymphoma whether they were receiving chemotherapy or no treatments. In 2013, Courneya published the CARE trial, a randomized controlled trial of combined aerobic and resistance exercise in breast cancer survivors receiving chemotherapy. In addition to these single center and multicenter trials, Courneya also co-led the Colon Health and Life-Long Exercise Change (Challenge) trial, a multi-national trial involving participants in Canada and Australia. As a result of his research, Courneya and Christine Friedenreich of Alberta Health Services received a $2.5 million team grant over five years from the Canadian Institutes of Health Research (CIHR) to conduct the Alberta Moving Beyond Breast Cancer (AMBER) cohort study.

Courneya's CRC in Physical Activity and Cancer was renewed in 2011 for another seven years and he received the Canadian Association of Psychosocial Oncology's 2012 Award for Research Excellence for his significant contribution to psychosocial oncology research in Canada. In the first year of his renewed CRC, Courneya began the AMBER cohort study, a prospective study of physical activity and health-related fitness in breast cancer survivors.

Courneya was again renewed as a CRC in Physical Activity and Cancer in 2018. Following this, he received a CIHR Foundation Grant to fund a series of studies to determine if exercise can lower the risk of cancer recurring and improve the effects of cancer treatment on overall survival. Courneya was named the winner of the 2019 Manulife Prize as a "trailblazing researcher who put exercise front and centre in cancer treatment." He was also the co-recipient of the Canadian Cancer Society's O.Harold Warwick Prize for his outstanding achievement in cancer control research.

Courneya was appointed to the Order of Canada in June 2023, with the rank of Officer.
