= Robin Boadway =

Canadian economist

Robin William Boadway
- Born: June 10, 1943 (age 83); Regina, Saskatchewan
- Citizenship: Canadian

Academic background
- Education: Royal Military College of Canada; University of Oxford; Queen's University

Academic work
- Discipline: Public Economics; Optimal Taxation
- Institutions: Queen's University
- Awards: Order of Canada
- Website: https://www.econ.queensu.ca/people/faculty/robin-boadway; Information at IDEAS / RePEc

Robin William Boadway, OC FRSC (born 10 June 1943) is a Canadian economist. He held the David Smith Chair at Queen's University in Kingston, Ontario. Earlier he was Sir Edward Peacock Professor of Economic Theory at Queen's University. He has taught at Queen's University since 1973. He was Head of the Department of Economics at Queen's from 1981 to 1986, and was previously associate director of the John Deutsch Institute for the Study of Economic Policy.

== Life ==
Born in Regina, Saskatchewan, he earned a degree in engineering at the Royal Military College of Canada in Kingston, Ontario in 1964 and studied economics at Oxford University on a Rhodes Scholarship. At Queen's, he completed his doctorate in economics. He was elected Fellow of the Royal Society of Canada in 1986.

He was previously editor of the Journal of Public Economics. He also serves on the editorial board of the Canadian Tax Journal, the National Tax Journal, International Tax and Public Finance and Regional Science and Urban Economics. His research interests are public sector economics and welfare economics, with special emphasis on tax theory and policy, redistribution, fiscal federalism and cost–benefit analysis. His work includes books entitled From Optimal tax theory to tax theory: Retrospective and Prospective views, Public Sector Economics, Welfare Economics, Canadian Tax Policy, Intergovernmental Fiscal Relations in Canada and Economics and the Canadian Economy as well as articles in academic journals. He has been involved in research studies for the John Deutsch Institute, the Economic Council of Canada, the World Bank, the OECD, the Financial and Fiscal Commission in South Africa, the Canadian Tax Foundation and for Royal Commissions on the Economic Union, on Passenger Transportation and on Aboriginal Peoples, the Mowatt Policy Center (University of Toronto) and various Canadian government departments.

In 2008, he was made an Officer of the Order of Canada in recognition for being "one of Canada's leading public finance economists". In 2009, he was the Distinguished CES Fellow at LMU Munich. He was Past President of the International Institute of Public Finance. On January 29, 2016, Boadway received an honorary doctorate from the Faculty of Social Sciences at Uppsala University for his contribution of "number of important insights to the study of public economics".
