= Daniel Woolf =

British-Canadian historian

Daniel Woolf FRHistS FSA FRSC
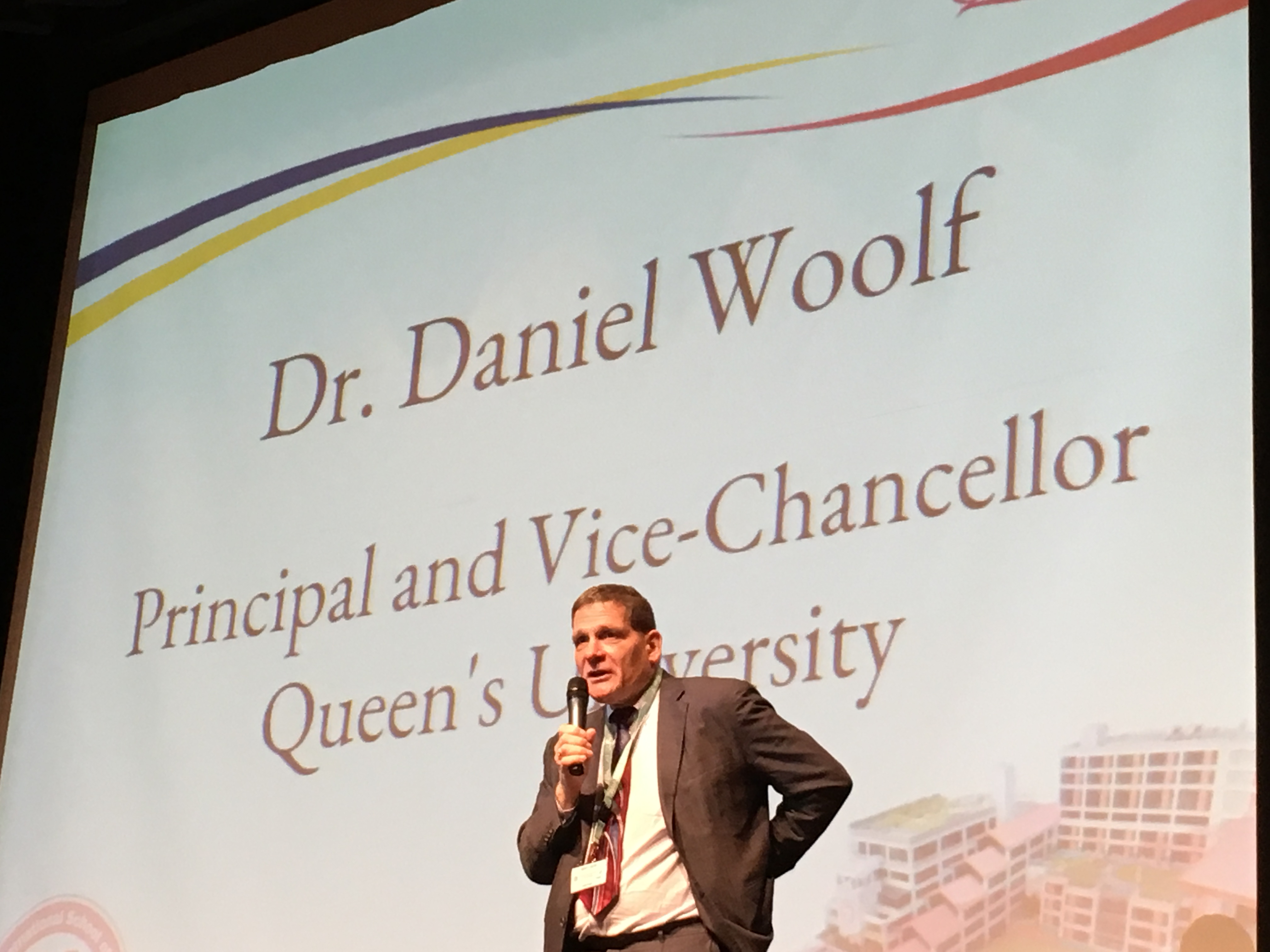
- Daniel Woolf speaking at a Queen's University event in Hong Kong in 2018

20th Principal and Vice-Chancellor of Queen's University
- In office 1 September 2009 – 30 June 2019
- Preceded by: Thomas R. Williams
- Succeeded by: Patrick Deane

Personal details
- Born: Daniel Robert Woolf; 5 December 1958 (age 67) London, England
- Spouse: Julie Gordon-Woolf
- Children: Sarah, Samuel and David
- Education: Queen's University at Kingston (BA); University of Oxford (DPhil)

Daniel Robert Woolf FRHistS FSA FRSC (born 5 December 1958) is a British-Canadian historian and former university administrator. He served as the 20th Principal and Vice-Chancellor of Queen's University in Kingston, Ontario, Canada, a position to which he was appointed in January 2009 and took up on 1 September 2009. He was previously a professor of history and the Dean of the Faculty of Arts at the University of Alberta. He was reappointed to a second 5-year term in 2013. In late 2017, Woolf announced his intention not to serve a third term and to retire from university administration at the end of his second term in 2019. He was succeeded by Patrick Deane, and became Principal Emeritus.

== Early life and education ==
Woolf was born in London, England, on 5 December 1958 to a Jewish family. His mother, Margaret Mary Woolf (1929–2014), was an English instructor at a university, and his father, Cyril Isaac Woolf (1930–2012), was an otolaryngologist, a Royal College of Surgeons of England Fellow and an adjunct faculty member at a medical school. His uncle was the historian Stuart Woolf (1936–2021), and his brother was the Vancouver-based architect Jeremy Woolf (1963–2026).

In 1961, his family emigrated to Winnipeg, Canada, where Woolf graduated from St. Paul's High School in 1976. He obtained his BA in History from Queen's University in Kingston, Ontario in 1980, and then a DPhil in Modern History from St Peter's College, University of Oxford, in 1983. He was supervised by Gerald E. Aylmer, a distinguished historian of 17th-century England and then-Master of St Peter's. Along with historians John Morrill and Paul Slack, Woolf would eventually co-edit a 1993 festschrift honouring Aylmer. Among Woolf's contemporaries at St Peter's was David Eastwood, Vice-Chancellor of the University of Birmingham since 2009.

== Career ==
Woolf returned to Canada in 1984 and taught at Queen's University as a Social Sciences and Humanities Research Council postdoctoral fellow in history until 1986, when he moved to Quebec and became an assistant professor of history at Bishop's University. After a 1-year appointment he joined the Department of History at Dalhousie University, Nova Scotia, as an assistant professor. Woolf was tenured in 1990, when he was also promoted to associate professor; 4 years later, he became a full professor.

In 1999, McMaster University appointed Woolf as the Dean of the Faculty of Humanities, serving as a professor of history in parallel. He relocated to University of Alberta in 2002, starting a 5-year term as the Dean of the Faculty of Arts, a position to which he was re-appointed in 2007, as well as a professor in the Department of History and Classics. In 2009, he was appointed by Queen's University as its 20th Principal and Vice-Chancellor. He took up the role on 1 September that year, serving until June 2019.

Academically, Woolf's research interests are in Tudor and Stuart British history and the global history of historiography. He is a Fellow of the Royal Society of Canada, Society of Antiquaries of London, and the Royal Historical Society. Between 1996 and 1997 he was a member of the School of Historical Studies under the Institute for Advanced Study in Princeton, New Jersey.

Since 2012, Woolf has been on the board of directors of Historica Canada (formerly the Historica-Dominion Institute). Having completed one term on the board of directors of the Higher Education Quality Council of Ontario, he is currently serving his second term (2021–2023). He is a member of the board of directors of Lakefield College School since 2020. He is also a member of the International Commission for the History and Theory of Historiography (ICHTH), currently serving as its Secretary-General (2022–2026).

Previously, he was the chair of the Council of Ontario Universities (2017–2019), a member of the board of directors of the Ontario Institute for Cancer Research (2016–2017), a member of the Executive Committee and Council of the Royal Society of Canada (2012–2016), and chair of the Standing Advisory Committee on International Relation of the Association of Universities and Colleges of Canada (renamed to Universities Canada in 2015) (2011–2014).

== Personal life ==
Woolf is married to Julie Anne Gordon-Woolf, a health administrator and part-time professional harpist. He has three children from a previous marriage to political scientist Jane Arscott, Sarah, Samuel and David.

During his tenure as principal, Woolf was famous for handing out cookies with his wife at Queen's University's libraries during exam season. He started this "cookie drop" in 2010.

== Honours and awards ==
- Fellow of the Royal Historical Society (1990)
- John Ben Snow Prize (2004)
- Fellow of the Society of Antiquaries of London of the Society of Antiquaries of London (2005)
- Fellow of the Royal Society of Canada (2006)

In 2023, to honour Woolf's decade of service as Principal and Vice-Chancellor, Queen's University established the Principal Emeritus Daniel R. Woolf Professorship in the Humanities; and renamed the first floor of Stauffer Library as the Daniel R. Woolf Gallery.

In 2024, a Festschrift, titled Reckoning with History, was published in Woolf's honour, in which 11 contributors engaged with his writings and ideas.

== Bibliography ==
Books

- The Idea of History in Early Stuart England, University of Toronto Press (1990)
- (co-ed., with John Morrill and Paul Slack) Public Duty and Private Conscience in Seventeenth-Century England, Oxford University Press (1993)
- (co-ed., with Thomas Mayer) Rhetorics of Life-Writing in Early Modern Europe, University of Michigan Press (1995)
- (ed.) A Global Encyclopedia of Historical Writing, Routledge (1998)
- Reading History in Early Modern England, Cambridge University Press (2000)
- (co-ed., with Adam Fox) The Spoken Word: Oral Culture in Britain 1500–1850, Manchester University Press (2002)
- The Social Circulation of the Past, Oxford University Press (2003)
- (co-ed., with Norman L. Jones) Local Identities in Late Medieval and Early Modern England, Palgrave Macmillan (2007)
- A Global History of History, Cambridge University Press (2011)
- (general editor) The Oxford History of Historical Writing, 5 volumes, Oxford University Press (2011–2012)
- A Concise History of History, Cambridge University Press (2019)
- History from Loss, Routledge (2023), co-edited with Marnie Hughes-Warrington

Selected articles and chapters

- "A feminine past? Gender, genre, and historical knowledge in England, 1500–1800", The American Historical Review, 102.3 (2005), 645-79

Academic offices
Preceded by Thomas R. Williams	Principal of Queen's University; 2009 – 2019	Succeeded by Patrick Deane
