= The Oxford History of Historical Writing =

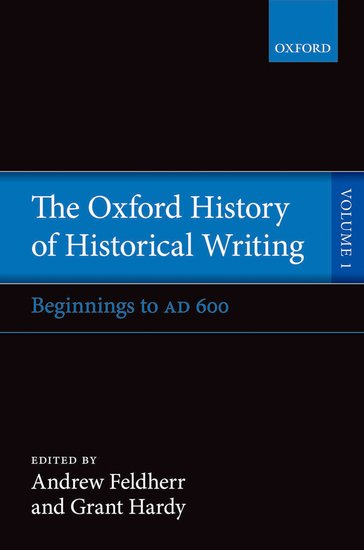
The Oxford History of Historical Writing, Vol. 1, 2011.

The Oxford History of Historical Writing is a five volume multi-authored history of historical writing published by Oxford University Press under the general editorship of Daniel Woolf.

== Volumes ==
- Volume 1: Beginnings to AD 600. Edited by Andrew Feldherr & Grant Hardy. (2011)
- Volume 2: 400–1400. Edited by Sarah Foot & Chase F. Robinson. (2012)
- Volume 3: 1400–1800. Edited by José Rabasa, Masayuki Sato, Edoardo Tortarolo, & Daniel Woolf. (2012)
- Volume 4: 1800–1945. Edited by Stuart Macintyre, Juan Maiguashca, & Attila Pók. (2011)
- Volume 5: Historical Writing since 1945. Edited by Axel Schneider & Daniel Woolf. (2011)
