= Robert Sutherland =

Jamaica-born Canadian lawyer (1830–1878)

Robert Sutherland (1830–June 2, 1878), a native of Jamaica, was the first known Black graduate at a Canadian university, and the first Black man to study law in British North America. A graduate of Queen's University, Sutherland qualified to practise law in Ontario under the then prevailing system of apprenticeship and examination. He studied at Osgoode Law School and practised law for 20 years in Walkerton, Ontario. Upon his death in 1878, Sutherland's left a large bequest (his entire estate of $12,000) to Queen's University, roughly equivalent to the institution's annual operating budget. This donation was the largest the school had ever received, saving it from financial catastrophe in a banking crisis. The funds permitted Queen's to remain an independent institution, rather than being annexed by the University of Toronto.

== Memorials at Queen's University ==
=== Sutherland Memorial Entrance Bursary ===
Established by the Afro-Caribe Community Foundation of Kingston and District with donations from friends and colleagues of the foundation. Awarded to a student entering any undergraduate program at Queen's University on the basis of financial need, good academic standing, and involvement in and/or contribution to the African or Caribbean communities in Canada. Applicants must be Canadian citizens or permanent residents of Canada.

=== Robert Sutherland Plaque in Grant Hall ===
The City of Kingston erected a plaque to Sutherland's memory in the front foyer of Grant Hall in 1974, when George Speal (Comm '54) was Mayor.

=== Student-led Recognition in 1997 ===
In January 1993, the Alma Mater Society of Queen's University established the AMS Robert Sutherland Task Force (RSTF) to "seek a space on campus which would be appropriate to recognize the contributions of Robert Sutherland, the university's first major benefactor and first Black graduate." The RSTF (Greg Frankson, Annette Paul, Kevin Ashby, Donna Wallen, Viniyini Murty, Kiké Roach and Rosalie Griffith) made recommendations that led to several new memorials.

==== Robert Sutherland Visitorship ====
The Robert Sutherland Visitorship was established by the John Deutsch University Centre Council in 1997, with the express purpose of bringing to Queen's University a noted speaker each year with expertise in the areas of equity, community diversity and race relations.

Visitors have included: Esmerelda Thornhill, academic and Black Canadian historian; Enid Lee, international consultant; Ken Wiwa, journalist and author; Patricia McFadden, activist; Faith Nolan, singer and songwriter; William Commanda, elder, and Romola Trebilcock; George Elliott Clarke, poet and author; Afua Cooper, dub poet and author; and Lawrence Hill, novelist.

==== The Robert Sutherland Prize ====
Presented annually by the Alma Mater Society to two Black students who have shown leadership and initiative at Queen’s University, in the areas of anti-racism and anti-oppression in the aim of creating a more inclusive campus environment.

==== Robert Sutherland Award for Excellence in Debating ====
The Alma Mater Society presents this award annually "to the member of the Debating Union who has distinguished him/herself as an outstanding contributor to the Union, exemplified the principles of fair play and sportsmanship, and has demonstrated superior skill and dedication while representing Queen's University on the national and/or international debating circuit(s)."

==== Robert Sutherland Room ====
Despite a recommendation from the RSTF to name the Fireplace Reading Room in Stauffer Library after Sutherland, in November 17, the Queen's University Board of Trustees confirmed the John Deutsch University Centre Council recommendation to name the University Centre's Billiard Room for Sutherland:

"Room 240, John Deutsch University Centre, in memory of Robert Sutherland, in recognition of his generous support of Queen’s through a large estate gift, the first major bequest received by the University."

The room is made available for meetings, lectures, performances and the like, and houses a dedication plaque along with the Sutherland Prize award board. It underwent renovations and was rededicated by the university on November 29, 2006.

==== Sutherland IV ====
The Sutherland IV is an intervarsity debate tournament in the format of Canadian Parliamentary, hosted annually by the Queen's Debating Union. Sutherland served as treasurer of the Union, then called the Dialectic Society, during the 1850-1851 academic year.

=== Policy Studies Building renamed Robert Sutherland Hall ===
On February 24, 2009, the university announced that the board of trustees unanimously voted to rename the Policy Studies Building in honour of Robert Sutherland the previous day. At its December 2008 meeting, the board acknowledged the student campaign to rename a building for Sutherland, asking the principal, Tom Williams, to give a recommendation on the subject. The New Robert Sutherland Task Force, led by students Michael Ceci, Leora Jackson, Talia Radcliffe, and Jeff Welsh managed to garner campus wide support for this initiative. Williams supported the campaign. The dedication ceremony for Robert Sutherland Hall took place on October 3, 2009. The building, located at 138 Union Street, had its signage changed in early summer 2009 to reflect the new name, which came into popular usage on campus almost immediately after the Board vote.

The university also has a page in its encyclopedia with details about Sutherland's life and the various memorials honouring his legacy.

== Other memorials ==
The Walkerton branch of the Bruce County Public Library, which now sits on the former site of Sutherland's office and likely home, contains the Robert Sutherland Archives Room.

== See also ==
- George Monro Grant

== Sources ==
- Minutes of Alma Mater Society of Queen's University Assembly, March 11, 1997.
- Final Report of the AMS Robert Sutherland Task Force, tabled and adopted unanimously at AMS Assembly, March 11, 1997.
- AMS Robert Sutherland Task Force Submission to the John Deutsch University Centre Council, August 28, 1997.
- Minutes of the meeting of the Queen's University Board of Trustees, October 3–4, 1997
- Information on the Robert Sutherland Visitorship - John Deutsch University Centre website
- Queen's University Senate - Scholarships and Student Aid Committee Report, May 2001
