= Robert Arntfield =

Canadian physician

- Citizenship: Canada
- Education: Queen's University, B.S. Western University, M.D.
- Occupations: Physician; CEO
- Medical career
- Profession: Professor of Medicine; Director of Critical Care Ultrasound Program & Fellowship
- Institutions: Icahn School of Medicine at Mount Sinai; Western University
- Sub-specialties: Intensivist Cardiorespiratory Physiology Resuscitation

Robert Arntfield is a Canadian intensivist, medical educator, researcher, and entrepreneur. His specialty is in cardiorespiratory physiology, resuscitation, and the use of artificial intelligence in healthcare. He is a Professor of Medicine and Director of Critical Care Ultrasound Program & Fellowship at Western University's Schulich School of Medicine & Dentistry, and is the Medical Director of the Critical Care Trauma Centre at London Health Sciences Centre. He is also the founder of the medical technology company Deep Breathe.

== Education ==
Arntfield received an undergraduate degree in computer science and biochemistry from Queen's University in 2000. He received his Doctor of Medicine degree from Western University in 2004. He has been board-certified in emergency medicine and critical care medicine.

Following the completion of his medical degree, Arntfield completed an ultrasound fellowship at the Icahn School of Medicine at Mount Sinai in New York City.

Arntfield is a Registered Diagnostic Medical Sonographer and holds a diplomate in adult echocardiography with the National Board of Echocardiography.

== Career ==
Arntfield is a Professor of Medicine and the Director of Critical Care Ultrasound Program & Fellowship at Western University, located in London, Ontario. He is also the Medical Director of the Critical Care Trauma Centre at London Health Sciences Centre.

In May 2020, Arntfield began work with a research team at Lawson Health Research Institute to investigate how artificial intelligence systems can be used to diagnose COVID-19 through patterns in lung scans. During the project, a study involved the real-time validation of a lung ultrasound learning model in intensive care units, demonstrating high accuracy in identifying B-line patterns in critically ill patients. This system also demonstrated high accuracy and surpassed physicians in detecting COVID-19 in lung ultrasounds. This system became the first product for his medical technology company, Deep Breathe, which he founded in 2021.

Arntfield is the founder and CEO of the medical technology company Deep Breathe. He founded Deep Breathe on the premise of democratizing medical ultrasound through increased use of point-of-care diagnostics and artificial intelligence automation. The company provides artificial intelligence software to automate the interpretation of medical images. The intended use is in conjunction with handheld, point-of-care lung ultrasound technology which the company purports can enable healthcare providers to diagnose various lung conditions with speed, accuracy, and objectivity. Currently, the software utilizes Deep Breathe's archive of lung ultrasound images, which is the largest in the world and spans over a decade of clinical research.

== Publications ==
Arntfield co-authored the textbook Point of Care Ultrasound. The book has received the British Medical Association's President's Choice Award and was Highly Commended in Internal Medicine in 2015. His research has been published by the American College of Chest Physicians, Emergency Medical Clinics of North America, and the Journal of the American Society of Echocardiography.
