= Thomas R. Williams =

Canadian academic and university administrator (1939–2025)

Thomas Williams

19th Principal of Queen's University at Kingston
- In office May 1, 2008 – August 31, 2009
- Preceded by: Karen R. Hitchcock
- Succeeded by: Daniel Woolf

Personal details
- Born: Thomas Robert Williams; September 9, 1939 Peterborough, Ontario, Canada
- Died: January 3, 2025 (aged 85) Kingston, Ontario, Canada
- Education: McGill University; University of Michigan

Thomas Robert Williams (September 9, 1939 – January 3, 2025) was a Canadian university professor and academic administrator who served as the 19th principal of Queen's University, in Kingston, Ontario. He became principal and vice-chancellor of Queen's on May 1, 2008, following the in-term resignation of Karen Hitchcock. He concluded his term as principal on August 31, 2009.

== Education and career ==
Williams was born on September 9, 1939 in Peterborough, Ontario. He spent his childhood in Peterborough, Notre-Dame-de-Grâce, Quebec, and Saint-Lambert, Quebec.

Williams began his post-secondary education at McGill University, graduating with a bachelor's degree in chemistry in 1960. He stayed on at McGill to complete two degrees in education, worked at the University of Chicago, and earned his doctorate in education from the University of Michigan. He then went to the staff of the Ontario Institute for Studies in Education (OISE) at the University of Toronto. He arrived at Queen's in 1977, to become the dean of the Faculty of Education, holding that position until 1986. He served as a professor in the Faculty of Education as well as in the School of Policy Studies. He served as vice-principal of operations, and as vice-principal of institutional relations, during the principalship of David Chadwick Smith (1984–1994). He was a professor emeritus of education and of policy studies, and maintained active research interests in both fields after his retirement.

== Principal at Queen's ==
Queen's principal and vice-chancellor, Karen Hitchcock, was the first woman and the first American to hold the posts and had been expected to serve until her five-year term ended on June 30, 2009. In January 2008, she had applied to be considered for re-appointment for a second five-year term. However, there was active dissent from the undergraduate student assembly and it unanimously passed a resolution calling for her not to be granted a second term. Amid controversy over her leadership, Hitchcock resigned on April 16, 2008, effective April 30, 2008.

Williams was appointed to fill the principalship vacancy in a vote from the Queen's board of trustees on April 25, 2008. He took office on May 1, 2008, and served until August 31, 2009, when he was succeeded as principal by Daniel Woolf of the University of Alberta. During his sixteen months in office, he contended with a ballooning deficit caused largely by the global economic crisis, improved relations with the city of Kingston, Ontario, and dealt with the ongoing problem of an unsanctioned street party by cancelling the annual fall homecoming celebrations. He also secured funding for a new medical school and a planned performing arts centre. In an interview with CKWS-TV on April 25, 2008, Williams called the Queen's principalship "the best job in Canada". Known on the campus informally as 'Dr. Tom', Williams served a term as honorary president of the Queen's Alma Mater Society in the late 1990s, and has historically enjoyed an excellent rapport with Queen's students. In October 2009, Queen's board of trustees recognized Williams' service to the university by awarding him the designation principal emeritus. On October 26, 2009, Williams received an honorary doctorate of laws from Queen's.

== Community involvement ==
Williams was an extensive contributor to both the Queen's and Kingston communities. He served on the board for both the main hospitals in the city, Kingston General Hospital and Hotel Dieu Hospital. He served on the board for the Kingston Community Foundation and for Imagine Kingston. He was also the chair of the building committee for the new performing arts centre at Queen's.

== Death ==
Williams died in Kingston, Ontario on January 3, 2025, aged 85.

Academic offices
Preceded by Karen R. Hitchcock	Principal of Queen's University; 2008–2009	Succeeded by Daniel Woolf
