= Queen's University Faculty of Arts and Science =

- Type: Public
- Established: 1841; 185 years ago
- Parent institution: Queen's University at Kingston
- Dean: Bob Lemieux
- Location: Kingston, Ontario, Canada; 44°13′31″N 76°29′43″W
- Website: www.queensu.ca/artsci

The Faculty of Arts and Science is the largest of all faculties at Queen's University at Kingston, and one of the original three faculties that founded the school in 1841.

== History ==
The Faculty of Arts and Science stands at the core of the history of Queen's University. The royal charter issued by Queen Victoria in 1841, which declared that the university would both train students as Presbyterian ministers and instruct youth “in the various branches in Science and Literature”, laid the Faculty's foundations, and — even though Theology seemed predominant for many years — made it possible for Queen's to emerge at last as a full-grown university with faculties of medicine and applied science.

Queen's opened its doors on March 7, 1842, making it the Dominion's first active university in all the 1860 kilometers between Fredericton, New Brunswick and the Pacific Ocean. Thirteen students enrolled in the first courses, which were offered in a small, wood-frame house on the edge of Kingston where the Reverends Peter Colin Campbell and J.A. Williamson as well as the University's first Principal, Thomas Liddell taught Classics, Mathematics and Natural Philosophy.

Twenty years later, the student body had swelled to 200 young men — an enrolment comparable to the universities of McGill, Toronto and Victoria that had come into being in the meantime. The faculty grew as well and its complement of five professors — including its first professor in History, a part-time lecturer without salary! — offered a broader range of subjects in the arts and sciences. Since the professoriate hailed predominantly from Britain, great care was taken to recruit faculty members under the age of 40 who, it was thought, would have less difficulty “adjusting to Canadian conditions”.

Today, the Faculty of Arts and Science is the largest faculty at Queen's, with approximately 8,500 full- and 1,000 part-time undergraduate students, 1,500 graduate students, and 450 faculty. It offers a broad range of undergraduate degree programs in the sciences, social sciences, humanities, fine arts, and languages. The Faculty also offers correspondence, spring and summer courses through its Arts and Science Online Department.

== Computing ==
The School of Computing makes its home in Goodwin Hall. It has the highest graduate-undergraduate ratio of any department at Queen's (nearly 2:1). The Turing Award (called the "Nobel Prize of Computing") has only ever been award to 2 Canadians, one of which was a Queen's alumnus.

== Creative Arts ==
Offering courses and programs in Drama, Film and Media, Fine Art (Visual Art), Music, and Music Theatre.

== Languages ==
Offering courses and programs in Classics, English Language and Literature, French Studies, Languages, Literatures and Cultures, and Linguistics. Languages offered include: Anishinaabemowin, Arabic, Chinese, German, Hebrew, Inuktitut, Italian, Japanese, Mohawk, Portuguese, Spanish, German, Spanish and Latin American Studies, and World Language Studies.

== Humanities ==
Offering courses and programs in Art History & Art Conservation, Classics, Drama, English Language & Literature, History, Jewish Studies Program, Philosophy, and Religious Studies.

== Social sciences ==
Offering courses and programs in Economics, Environmental Studies, Gender Studies, Geography, Global Development Studies, Industrial Relations, Kinesiology & Health Studies, Political Studies, Psychology, Sociology, and Urban & Regional Planning.

== Natural and physical science ==
Offering courses and programs in Biochemistry, Biology, Chemistry, Environmental Studies, Geography, Geology, Kinesiology & Health Studies, Life Sciences, Math & Statistics, Physics & Astronomy, and Psychology.

== Student government ==
The faculty's undergraduate student government is the Arts and Science Undergraduate Society (A.S.U.S.). A.S.U.S. sends representatives and its executive to the university-wide undergraduate student government, the AMS. It also has its own assembly and manages its own set of events, organizations, and committees.

=== PHEKSA ===
The Physical Health Education & Kinesiology Student Association (PHEKSA) is a student-run group at Queen's University that is composed of a Council, Assembly, and Honorary and Ordinary members.

=== CESA ===
Founded in 1985, the Concurrent Education Students' Association represents more than 900 students enrolled in the Concurrent Education program at Queen's University. The Association serves as a representative body for students in the program and works to facilitate communication with external organizations. It also supports community-building among students in the program.

=== COMPSA ===
Queen's University Computing Students’ Association (COMPSA) is the student government for Queen's University School of Computing. COMPSA is run by a group of highly motivated students who represent and bring together the entire Computing student community through various events and opportunities.

=== SGPS ===
Queen's Society of Graduate and Professional Students (SGPS) is a student government to provide a voice for all graduate and professional students at Queen's University. SGPS is run by students who represent and build the community of Queen's for all students past the undergraduate level.

== Online studies ==
Since Queen's began offering “extension” courses in 1889 the Faculty of Arts and Science offers online courses and programs through Arts and Science Online (previously Continuing and Distance Studies). Programs offered through online studies include: English, Global Development Studies, History, Liberal Studies, Psychology, Life Sciences, Academic Writing, Employment Relations, Entrepreneurship, Innovation & Creativity, French for Professionals, Global Action & Engagement, and Media Studies.

== Queen's Undergraduate Internship Program ==
The Queen's Undergraduate Internship Program (QUIP) provides students with a 12-16 month work experience. QUIP internships are paid, professionally supervised, career-related positions designed to offer second or third year students the opportunity to learn about current advances, practices and technologies in business and industry. This opportunity is open to both domestic and international students.
