= Harriet MacMillan =

Canadian pediatrician, psychiatrist and scientist

- Born: Baltimore, Maryland

Academic background
- Education: MSc, Clinical Epidemiology and Biostatistics, 1994, McMaster University; M.D., 1982, Queen's University
- Thesis: Effectiveness of public health nurse home visitation in preventing the recurrence of child physical abuse and neglect (1994)

Harriet Louise MacMillan is a Canadian pediatrician, psychiatrist and scientist. As a Distinguished University Professor at McMaster University, she was also elected fellow of the Royal Society of Canada and Canadian Academy of Health Sciences.

== Early life and education ==
MacMillan was born in Baltimore, Maryland, to Canadian parents but was raised in Hamilton, Ontario. She was born into a physician family as both her grandfather and father were medical doctors. Her grandfather was a family physician who was heavily involved with the West Lincoln Memorial Hospital while her father Angus MacMillan co-founded McMaster University's Department of Pediatrics. She completed her Master of Science degree in Clinical Epidemiology and Biostatistics at McMaster University before enrolling at Queen's University for her medical degree. Following this, she completed her residency in psychiatry and pediatrics at SickKids Hospital.

== Career ==
Following her residency, MacMillan accepted a visiting fellowship at Harvard Medical School before returning to McMaster as a faculty member in 1992. Upon joining the faculty, MacMillan served as the founding director of the Child Advocacy and Assessment Program (CHAP) at McMaster Children's Hospital from 1993 to 2004. As an assistant professor of psychiatry and pediatrics in the faculty of health sciences at McMaster University, MacMillan also collaborated with her father to study aboriginal health care. While serving in these dual roles, MacMillan received a grant from the Ontario Women's Health Council to conduct cross-province research including hospital emergency departments, family physician's offices, obstetrics and gynecology clinics, community health centers, and midwifery practices, to discover how best to identify woman abuse in health settings.

Upon stepping down as director, MacMillan was appointed the Endowed David R. (Dan) Offord Chair in Child Studies and continued her research into incidence, control, and prevention of violence against women and children.

In 2010, MacMillan was appointed director of the newly established Centre for Research Development in Gender, Mental Health and Violence Across the Lifespan through funding from the Canadian Institutes of Health Research (CIHR). While serving in this role, she also oversaw the Preventing Violence Across the Lifespan (PreVAiL) Research Network to develop cross-Canada formal guidance and education materials to help health professionals better support victims of violence.

As a result of her career "in leading research in the prevention of, and response to, family violence," MacMillan was honoured as a member of the Order of Canada in 2017. She was also conferred the title of Distinguished University Professor by McMaster University for conducting research that has "led to a better understanding of the impact of exposure to violence and its link to mental health outcomes and has spurred international prevention efforts."

In February 2020, MacMillan co-developed an online resource called the Violence Evidence Guidance Action (VEGA) project which aimed at educating health care and social service providers and students across Canada in recognizing and responding to family violence. During the COVID-19 pandemic, MacMillan helped develop a provincewide survey to gather data on how families are coping with the pandemic. She was also elected a fellow of two national honor societies; the Royal Society of Canada and Canadian Academy of Health Sciences.
