= 1000 Awesome Things =

Web blog

- Website type: Blog (user-generated)
- Available in: English
- Creator: Neil Pasricha
- Website: 1000awesomethings.com
- Commercial: No
- Registration: No
- Launched: June 20, 2008
- Current status: Active

1000 Awesome Things is a blog written by Neil Pasricha, who posts one thing in life he considers awesome each weekday. The site was launched on June 20, 2008 and counted down until #1 was posted on April 19, 2012.

== History ==
The author said that at the time of starting the site "if you flipped open the newspaper it was filled with the same stuff every day. The polar ice caps were melting, there were pirates storming the seas, the economy was on the verge of collapse, and there were wars going on all over the world." As a result, he created a website discussing "popping bubble wrap, or snow days, or the smell of a bakery." In later interviews, and through a series on his blog, Pasricha shared that his divorce and a friend's suicide prompted him to continue looking for positive things in life.

== Books ==
The Book of Awesome cover.

In 2009, Neil Pasricha was approached by literary agents after winning the Webby Award and signed with Erin Malone from WME, who has also represented blog-to-books Stuff White People Like and Texts From Last Night. The Book of Awesome was published as a 400-page hardcover the United States and Canada in April, 2010 from AEB/Putnam, a division of Penguin Publishing. The book became a bestseller in its first week and a New York Times bestseller. The book has been translated and is available in Dutch, Korean, German, Japanese, Portuguese, Chinese, and French.

In Canada, The Book of Awesome was recognized as a Heather's Pick. It has been a bestseller on The Globe and Mail bestseller list for over 130 weeks and was the #1 Globe and Mail non-fiction book of the year for 2010 and 2011 and the #3 non-fiction book for 2012. It has been a #1 bestseller in many international markets.

Pasricha has also contributed to The Book of (Even More) Awesome and The Book of (Holiday) Awesome, both published in 2011.

== Movie ==
In a 2012 newspaper interview the author said The Book of Awesome has been optioned for a movie but did not discuss details.

== Media coverage ==
The Book of Awesome and 1000 Awesome Things have been covered by magazines, newspapers, and broadcasters such as The Today Show, BBC, CNN, The Guardian, Reader's Digest, Entertainment Weekly, Wired's GeekDad blog, The New Yorker, Slate, TEDxToronto on YouTube, and The Globe and Mail.

== Awards ==
- 2010 Webby Awards for Best Blog - People's Voice Award.
- 2009 Webby Awards for Best Blog - Culture / Personal.
- 2009 Webby Awards for Best Blog - People's Voice Award.
- listed in PC Magazine's Top 50 Blogs of 2010.
- listed in PC Magazine's Top 100 Websites of 2009.
- listed in PC Magazine's Top 50 Blogs of 2009.

== See also ==
- Texts from Last Night
- PostSecret
- Cake Wrecks
