= Emergency Medicine Clinics of North America =

- Discipline: Emergency medicine
- Language: English

Publication details
- Publisher: Elsevier
- Impact factor: 2.000 (2021)

Standard abbreviations
- ISO 4: Emerg. Med. Clin. N. Am.

Links
- Journal homepage; Online archive

Emergency Medicine Clinics of North America is a medical journal that covers the aspects of anesthesia, critical care, and emergency medicine on the latest trends in patient management. The journal is published by Elsevier.

== Abstracting and indexing ==
The journal is abstracted and indexed in:

- Embase
- PubMed/Medline
- CINAHL
- Biological Abstracts
- Current Contents - Clinical Medicine
- Science Citation Index
- Research Alert

According to the Journal Citation Reports, the journal has a 2021 impact factor of 2.000.
