= Elizabeth Goodyear-Grant =

Canadian political scientist

- Born: 1976 (age 49–50)
- Education: Dalhousie University; McGill University
- Scientific career
- Fields: Political science
- Workplaces: Queen's University

Elizabeth Goodyear-Grant (born 1976) is a Canadian political scientist. She is the director of the Canadian Opinion Research Archive, director of Queen's Institute for Intergovernmental Relations, and professor of political science at Queen's University. She specializes in Canadian politics, with a focus on elections and voting behaviour, gender in politics, women candidates and political leaders, and politics and the media.

== Career ==
=== Education ===
Goodyear-Grant holds a Bachelor of Arts in political science from the University of Guelph, a master's degree from Dalhousie University, and a doctorate from McGill University.

=== Positions ===
Goodyear-Grant serves as director of both the Canadian Opinion Research Archive and the Queen's Institute of Intergovernmental Relations and as an associate professor at Queen's University. She has taught at Queen's University since 2006.

=== Awards ===
Goodyear-Grant was awarded by Queen's University the 2020 Faculty of Arts and Science Award for Excellence in Graduate Teaching. Her book Gendered News: Media Coverage and Electoral Politics in Canada won the 2016 Pierre Savard Award from the International Council of Canadian Studies. It was also one of the three books shortlisted for the Canadian Political Science Association's Donald Smiley Prize in 2014.

=== Research ===
The main areas of study of Goodyear-Grant include Canadian politics, elections and voting behaviour, gender in politics, women political candidates and legislators, politics and the media, and representation.

Goodyear-Grant has contributed to the news site The Conversation on topics including the role of women voters in the 2021 Canadian federal election, the influence of sex and gender on how Canadians vote (with Amanda Bittner), the impact of the COVID-19 pandemic on women's candidacy, and the weak influence of childcare proposals on Canadian voting attitudes. She is also a contributor to Policy Options, the digital magazine of the Institute for Research on Public Policy, focusing on topics relating to gender, race, and the COVID-19 pandemic (with Allison Harell and Laura Stephenson), gender in the aftermath of the 2015 Canadian federal election, and the framing of gender and childcare policies (with Rebecca Wallace). She has been cited and quoted by CBC News on topics relating to gender in Canadian politics. She has also provided analysis of Canadian elections to local newspapers, such as the Abbotsford News.

== Select publications ==
- Goodyear-Grant, Elizabeth, and Julie Croskill. (2011). "Gender Affinity Effects in Vote Choice in Westminster Systems: Assessing “Flexible” Voters in Canada." Politics and Gender, 7: 223–250.
- Goodyear-Grant, Elizabeth. (2013). Gendered News: Media Coverage and Electoral Politics in Canada. Vancouver: UBC Press.
- Bittner, Amanda, and Elizabeth Goodyear-Grant. (2017). "Sex isn’t Gender: Reforming Concepts and Measurements in the Study of Public Opinion." Political Behavior, 39(4), 1019–1041.
- Bittner, Amanda, and Elizabeth Goodyear-Grant. (2017). "Digging Deeper into the Gender Gap: Gender Salience as a Moderating Factor in Political Attitudes." Canadian Journal of Political Science, 50(2), 559–578.
- Goodyear-Grant, Elizabeth, and Erin Tolley. (2019). "Voting for One’s Own: Racial Group Identification and Candidate Preferences." Politics, Groups, and Identities 7(1), 131–147.
