= Neil Pasricha =

Canadian author, entrepreneur, podcaster

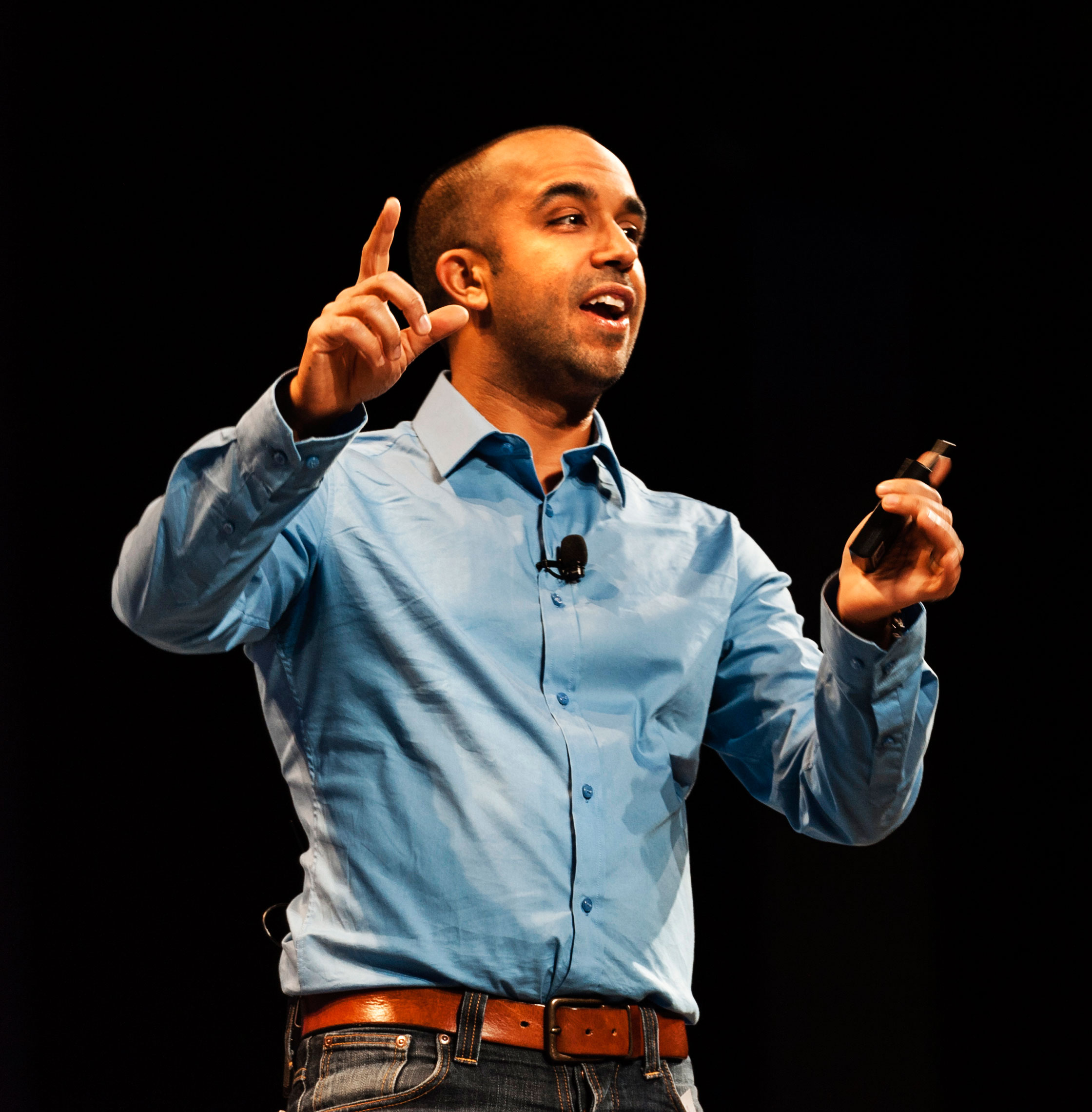
- Neil Pasricha speaking in San Diego, CA. By Ken West.
- Born: September 17, 1979 (age 47); Oshawa, Ontario, Canada
- Education: BComm from Queen's University, MBA from Harvard Business School
- Occupations: Author, Speaker
- Writing career
- Notable works: The Book of Awesome (2010); The Book of (Even More) Awesome (2011); The Book of (Holiday) Awesome (2011); The Happiness Equation (2016)
- Website: neil.blog globalhappiness.org 1000awesomethings.com

Neil Pasricha (born September 17, 1979) is a Canadian author, entrepreneur, podcaster, and public speaker characterized by his advocacy of positivity and simple pleasures. He is best known for his The Book of Awesome series, and "The Happiness Equation" which are international bestsellers. He is also an established speaker and his TEDx talk, "The 3 A's of Awesome", is ranked as the ninth most inspiring TEDx talk with over 3 million views to date. In total, he has sold over 1 million books. The book and TED talk are based on Pasricha's blog, 1000 Awesome Things. The blog has won three Webby Awards and ranked in PCMag's list of top blogs and websites in 2009 and 2010.

Pasricha is frequently sought out by media outlets as an expert on the topics of positivity and leadership.

Pasricha is also a recipient for the 2018 Canada's 40 under 40 award.

== Early life ==
Pasricha was born in Oshawa, Ontario to a Hindu family. His mother is from Nairobi, Kenya; his father is from Amritsar, India, and he has one sister. Pasricha says much of his wonder for the world comes from his immigrant parents and their perspective on seeing everything for the first time in Canada. In his TED Talk he explains how his father would 'stare in wonder at the little stickers on all the fruits and vegetables.'

Pasricha was educated at Queen's University and Harvard University.

== Career ==
Pasricha graduated with a Bachelor of Commerce at Queen's University in 2002. While there, he wrote for the campus humor newspaper "Golden Words", which then took him to New York City to work for a humor syndicate with former Saturday Night Live and The Simpsons writers. He says "It was a cool rush but it became draining very quickly. I realized this could never be my full-time thing." Pasricha also holds an honorary degree of Doctor of Laws - Faculty of Education from the University of Ontario Institute of Technology (UOIT).

Pasricha returned to Toronto and worked in marketing for Procter & Gamble before leaving to run a Quiznos Sub franchise and then selling his franchise to move to Boston to attend Harvard Business School. Upon graduating, Pasricha returned to Toronto to run leadership development at Walmart Canada. Pasricha left Walmart in 2016 to devote more time to the Institute for Global Happiness, an organization he founded in November 2015 to improve happiness in the workplace.

== Author ==
=== Blog ===
Pasricha began writing a daily blog called 1000 Awesome Things on June 20, 2008. The site was billed as 'a time-ticking countdown of 1000 awesome things.'

He said at the time of starting the site, "If you flipped open the newspaper it was filled with the same stuff every day. Polar ice caps were melting, there were pirates storming the seas, the economy was on the verge of collapse, and there were wars going on all over the world." As a result, he created a website discussing "popping bubble wrap, snow days, and the smell of a bakery." In later interviews, and through a series on his blog, Pasricha shared that his personal divorce and a close friend's suicide are what prompted him to begin looking for positive things in life.

In July, 2008, the popular links site Fark.com linked to post #980 Old, dangerous playground equipment which gave the blog new readership and got attention from Wired and CNN.com.

In 2009, Pasricha was approached by literary agents after his blog received 10 million hits and won the Webby Award for "Best Blog" and signed with Erin Malone from WME who also represents Christian Lander, author of Stuff White People Like, and Rainn Wilson, star of The Office and author of SoulPancake.

Pasricha continued publishing one awesome thing a day until #1 Anything you want it to be was posted on April 19, 2012.

=== Books ===
==== The Book of Awesome ====
Published in 2010 by Amy Einhorn Books, a division of Penguin Publishing.

The Book of Awesome is a #1 international bestseller, and a New York Times bestseller.

Pasricha wrote The Book of Awesome while attempting to get over his divorce and close friend's suicide. His frustration with the 'gloom and doom' in the news caused him to expand on simple pleasures of life through new written essays complementing existing material from his blog.

The book received both positive and negative reviews. Publishers Weekly said "Pasricha emerges a committed but inviting optimist, combating life's unending stream of bad news by identifying opportunities to share a universal high five with humanity" while Maclean's wrote that Pasricha was "partly to blame for turning 'awesome' into the exuberant adjective of our time' and the Toronto Star wrote that Neil Pasricha "helped destroy language through linguistic bleaching."

==== The Book of (Even More) Awesome ====
Published in 2011 by Amy Einhorn Books, a division of Penguin Publishing, as the sequel to The Book of Awesome.

==== The Book of (Holiday) Awesome ====
Published in 2013 by Amy Einhorn Books, a division of Penguin Publishing, featuring awesome things about holidays such as Christmas, Hannukah, Diwali, Halloween, Mother's Day, etc.

==== Awesome is Everywhere ====
Published in 2015, Awesome is Everywhere is a Children's book that Neil wrote to share "the principles of attitude awareness and authenticity" with his child. The beach theme was inspired by a meditation-like experience on the beach while honeymooning. The super-realistic images in the book were created by a professional Visual Effects studio using a process that composites many images into one image.

==== The Happiness Equation ====
Published in 2016 by Putnam Publishing, a division of Penguin Publishing.

The Happiness Equation is a #1 international bestseller, Toronto Star bestseller, and Globe and Mail bestseller.

Pasricha was returning from his honeymoon in Asia when his wife took a pregnancy test in the airplane bathroom and told him on the plane that she was pregnant. Upon landing, he began writing a letter to his unborn child on how to live a happy life, which evolved into the book.

==== How to Get Back Up ====
Published in 2018 by Audible Studios, the production arm of Audible, a subsidiary of Amazon.

This audio book is subtitled "A Memoir of Failure & Resilience" and was published as an exclusive title to the Amazon audiobook brand of Audible. Neil performed the recording for the book with a minor cameo by his father. The book is a collection of stories highlighting both the highs and lows in his attempt to find his way in the world. It is a candid look at his early family life and the experiences that helped shaped his view of the world. The running theme is that success comes not from focusing on failures, but from continuing to move forward.

The primary tagline for the book is: "We all fail. We all fall. We all need to know how to get back up."

==== You Are Awesome ====
Published in 2019 by Gallery Books, a division of Simon & Schuster.

In it Pasricha discusses topics of resilience, failure, cell phone addiction, and our inability to predict the future.

The book received both positive and negative reviews. The Toronto Star said it was "inspiring advice on developing resilience and putting a positive spin on life's setbacks and heartbreaks" while Publishers Weekly wrote it was "a slick but ultimately underwhelming production with little to appeal to the thoughtful reader”.

== Podcast ==
=== 3 Books with Neil Pasricha ===
Pasricha hosts a podcast titled 3 Books with Neil Pasricha which focuses on discussing the three most formative books of guests such as Judy Blume, Seth Godin, and the "world's greatest Uber driver." The podcast publishes on the lunar calendar and is stated to be uncovering the 1000 most formative books over 333 consecutive new moons and full moons from March 31, 2018, to September 1, 2031.

== The Institute for Global Happiness ==
Pasricha is the Director of The Institute for Global Happiness with the mission "to increase happiness in organizations." The organization shares resources such as workshops, videos, and speeches with the goal of making happiness accessible. Pasricha says the organization focuses on happiness at work specifically because "aggregate data from 150,000 people showed the place we're spending most of our time is also the place we're the least happy — which is work."

== Other work ==
=== The Awesome Project ===
In 2015, to help with literacy among children, Pasricha spearheaded an initiative with book publishers and educators to bring more books and funding to elementary schools.

== Awards and honors ==
- 2009 - Winner - Webby Award - Best Blog
- 2009 - Winner - Webby People's Voice - Best Blog
- 2010 - Winner - Webby People's Voice - Best Blog
- 2012 - Winner - White Pine Award - Best Non-Fiction
- 2018 - Canada's Top 40 Under 40
- 2018 - Apple's "Best of 2018" (3 Books Podcast)

== Personal life ==
Pasricha currently lives in Toronto, Ontario, Canada with his wife Leslie. He worked at Walmart Canada in the field of leadership.
