= Andrew McFadyen =

Canadian nonprofit executive (born 1977)

Personal details
- Born: 7 July 1977 (age 49)
- Spouse: Ellen Buck-McFadyen
- Education: Queen's University
- Occupation: Educator

Andrew McFadyen (born 1977) is the Executive Director of The Isaac Foundation. He founded The Isaac Foundation, a non-profit organization, to fund viable and innovative research projects that aim to find a cure for MPS VI, a rare and progressive disease of which his eldest son, Isaac, was diagnosed. The Isaac Foundation has funded numerous international research grants since 2006, totalling well over $1 million. Isaac, the McFadyens, and The Isaac Foundation, have been featured in articles in newspapers throughout the United States and Canada, includingThe Globe and Mail, The Independent, Kingston Life Magazine, and Sun Media.

McFadyen has led numerous advocacy efforts throughout North America, succeeding in having government decisions reversed.

He is a member of the NYU Working Group on Compassionate Use and Preapproval Access (CUPA). He is an associate fellow of the GE2P2 Global Foundation and is a member of its Independent Bioethics Advisory Committee (IBAC). The Committee provides bioethics consultative services to commercial and other biopharma organizations on clinical trials, expanded access programs for investigational medicines and therapies, and in other areas. In 2016, McFadyen testified as an expert witness to the US Senate Committee of Homeland Security and Government Affairs regarding "Exploring A Right To Try For Terminally Ill Patients". He has written extensively on the subject and has been quoted in news articles regarding the legislation.

McFadyen has contributed to shaping public policy throughout Canada with respect to availability of million dollar per-year treatments for children dying from rare diseases, and continues to work and support families as they deal with the struggles of diagnosis and its ramifications. McFadyen and The Isaac Foundation were featured in the fall edition of GO Magazine and the Clinical Leader for their work with families dealing with MPS diseases throughout Canada. In 2014, He was featured on Global National's Everyday Heroes segment. The Isaac Foundation has found public support and advocacy in musicians (John Mayer, Ron Sexsmith, The Tragically Hip, and Danny Michel), and sports figures (Toronto Blue Jays' pitcher, Roy Halladay).

In 2013, McFadyen created a second non-profit corporation called Equal Access for Rare Disorders to work toward fair and equitable access to treatments for children affected by rare diseases throughout Canada and the United States.

McFadyen is a former educator and writer, having taught for 16 years as a 7/8 teacher for the Limestone District School Board. He received his Bachelor of Arts and his Bachelor of Education degrees from Queen's University. McFadyen is the author of the 2008 educational resource, The Educator's Guide to the Vinyl Cafe, planned and collaboratively written with Stuart McLean, host of CBC radio's The Vinyl Cafe. McFadyen has been a guest lecturer at Queen's University's Faculty of Education, lecturing to education students and to International Education Professors. He is a Teaching Excellence Fellow for Queen's University's Interactive Technology program.
