= Rosa Bruno-Jofré =

Argentine researcher

- Born: 1946 (age 79–80); Argentina

Academic background
- Education: B.A., Universidad Nacional del Sur; PhD., University of Calgary
- Thesis: The Educational Work of the American Methodist Episcopal Mission in Peru (1889-1930): Social Gospel and American Economic and Ideological Penetration (1985)

Academic work
- Institutions: Western Washington University; University of Manitoba; Queen's University

Rosa del Carmen Bruno-Jofré FRSC (1946) is an historian of education. She is Professor Emerita and former Dean (2000-2010) of the Faculty of Education at Queen's University. She was cross-appointed to the Department of History, Faculty of Arts and Science, at Queen's. In 2019, Bruno-Jofré was elected a Fellow of the Royal Society of Canada in the Social Sciences and Humanities Division. Bruno-Jofré’s research has been and is funded by the Social Sciences and Humanities Research Council of Canada.

== Career ==
Bruno-Jofré is an Argentinian who moved to Canada after a stay in Peru in 1977. After earning her PhD from the University of Calgary, Dr. Bruno-Jofré accepted academic positions with Western Washington University and the University of Manitoba. After serving three years at the University of Manitoba as an Associate Dean of Education, she joined the faculty of Queen's University in 2000 as the Dean of Education. She spent 10 years in this role. As Dean of Education, she was the recipient of the 2004 Lamp of Learning Award given by the Ontario Secondary School Teachers' Federation.

Dr. Bruno-Jofré is the co-founding editor of Encounters in Theory and History of Education since 2000, and is the founding editor of the Theory and History of Education Monograph Series. She is also the founding coordinator of The Theory and History of Education Research Group, which originated in 2007.

In 2010, Bruno-Jofré received the International Award, Santander Group as a Distinguished Visiting Professor at the Universidad Complutense de Madrid. In 2017, TD Canada Trust named Bruno-Jofré as one of the 10 most influential Hispanic Canadians. Bruno-Jofré was subsequently honoured with the 2018 G.E. Clerk Award by the Canadian Catholic Historical Association for excellence in Catholic studies and by Queen's for her research and leadership skills. In 2019, Bruno-Jofré was elected a Fellow of the Royal Society of Canada in the Social Sciences and Humanities Division. In 2022, Bruno-Jofré received the Distinguished Historian Award from the Triennial on the History of Women Religious, at the University of Notre Dame’s CUSHWA Center. In addition to her administrative roles, Bruno-Jofré taught at Queen’s University from 2000-2025.

== Academic Work ==
Among other titles, Bruno-Jofré’s books include Ivan Illich Fifty Years Later: Situating Deschooling Society in His Intellectual and Personal Journey, co-authored with Jon Igelmo, (University of Toronto Press, 2022); The Sisters of Our Lady of the Missions: From Ultramontane Origins to a New Cosmology (University of Toronto Press, 2020); Teacher Education at the Crossroads of Multiple Modernities and Internationalities, (XIX-XX Centuries), co-edited with Diana Gonçalves Vidal, (Open Portal, University of Sao Paulo, Brazil, 2025), and Rethinking Freire and Illich: Historical, Philosophical and Theological Perspectives, co-edited with Michael Attridge and Jon Igelmo, (University of Toronto Press, 2023). In 2025, Rethinking Freire and Illich: Historical, Philosophical and Theological Perspectives received the Canadian Foundations for Education Edited Book Prize.

Many of Bruno-Jofré’s authored and co-authored articles have appeared in Educational Theory, Hispania Sacra, Journal of the History of Ideas, American Catholic Review, Historical Studies, and Journal of Ecclesiastical History (Cambridge), Oxford Education Research Encyclopedia, Bordón (Sociedad Española de Pedagogía), Historical Reflections/Relexions Historiques, and Enfoques Educacionales, among other publications. She has written and edited books published by University of Toronto Press, McGill-Queen’s University Press, Routledge, Open Portal, University of Sao Paulo, Brazil, and Wilfrid Laurier University Press.

== Books ==
=== Books: Author ===
- The Sisters of Our Lady of Missions: From Ultramontane Origins to a New Cosmology. 2020. Montréal and Kingston, London and Ithaca: McGill-Queen’s University Press.
- The Missionary Oblate Sisters: Vision and Mission. 2005. Montréal and Kingston, London and Ithaca: McGill-Queen’s University Press. Also translated into French. (Shortlisted for the Margaret McWilliams Award in the category of scholarly history for 2005.)
- Methodist Education in Peru: Social Gospel, Politics, and American Ideological and Economic Penetration, 1888‑1930. 1988. Waterloo: Canadian Corporation for Studies in Religion – Wilfrid Laurier University Press.

=== Books: Co-Author ===
- Rosa Bruno-Jofré and Jon Igelmo Zaldívar, 2022. Ivan Illich Fifty Years Later: Situating Deschooling Society in his Intellectual and Personal Journey. Toronto: University of Toronto Press.
- Rosa Bruno-Jofré, Heidi McDonald, and Elizabeth Smyth. 2017. Vatican II and Beyond: The Changing Mission and Identity of Canadian Women Religious. Montréal and Kingston: McGill-Queen’s University Press.
- Rosa Bruno-Jofré, James Scott Johnston, Gonzalo Jover, and Daniel Trohler. 2010. Democracy and the Intersection of Religion and Traditions: The Readings of John Dewey's Understanding of Democracy and Education. Montréal and Kingston, London and Ithaca: McGill-Queen’s University Press.

=== Books: Editor and Co-Editor ===
- Rosa Bruno-Jofré and Diana Gonçalves Vidal, Teacher Education at the Crossroads of Multiple Modernities and Internationalities (XIX-XX Centuries). 2025. Open Portal, University of Sao Paulo, Brazil.
- Rosa Bruno-Jofré, Michael Attridge, and Jon Igelmo Zaldívar (Eds). 2023. Rethinking Freire and Illich: Historical, Philosophical, and Theological Perspectives. Toronto: University of Toronto Press.
- Rosa Bruno-Jofré (Ed.). 2019. Educationalization and its Complexities: Religion, Politics, and Technology. Toronto: University of Toronto Press.
- Rosa Bruno-Jofré and Jon Igelmo Zaldívar (Eds.). 2017. Catholic Education in the Wake of Vatican II. Toronto: University of Toronto Press.
- Rosa Bruno-Jofré and James Scott Johnston (Eds.). 2014. Teacher Education in a Transnational World. Toronto: University of Toronto Press.
- Rosa Bruno-Jofré and Jürgen Schriewer (Eds.). 2011. The Global Reception of John Dewey’s Thought: Multiple Refractions Through Time and Space. New York & London: Routledge.
- Rosa Bruno-Jofré and Natalia Aponiuk. (Eds.). 2001. Educating Citizens for a Pluralistic Society. Calgary: Canadian Ethnic Studies Association.
- Rosa Bruno-Jofré. 1993. (Ed.). Issues in the History of Education in Manitoba: From the Construction of the Common School to the Politics of Voices. New York: Edwin Mellen Press.
