= Karen R. Hitchcock =

American biologist (1943–2019)

Karen R. Hitchcock PhD, FAAA
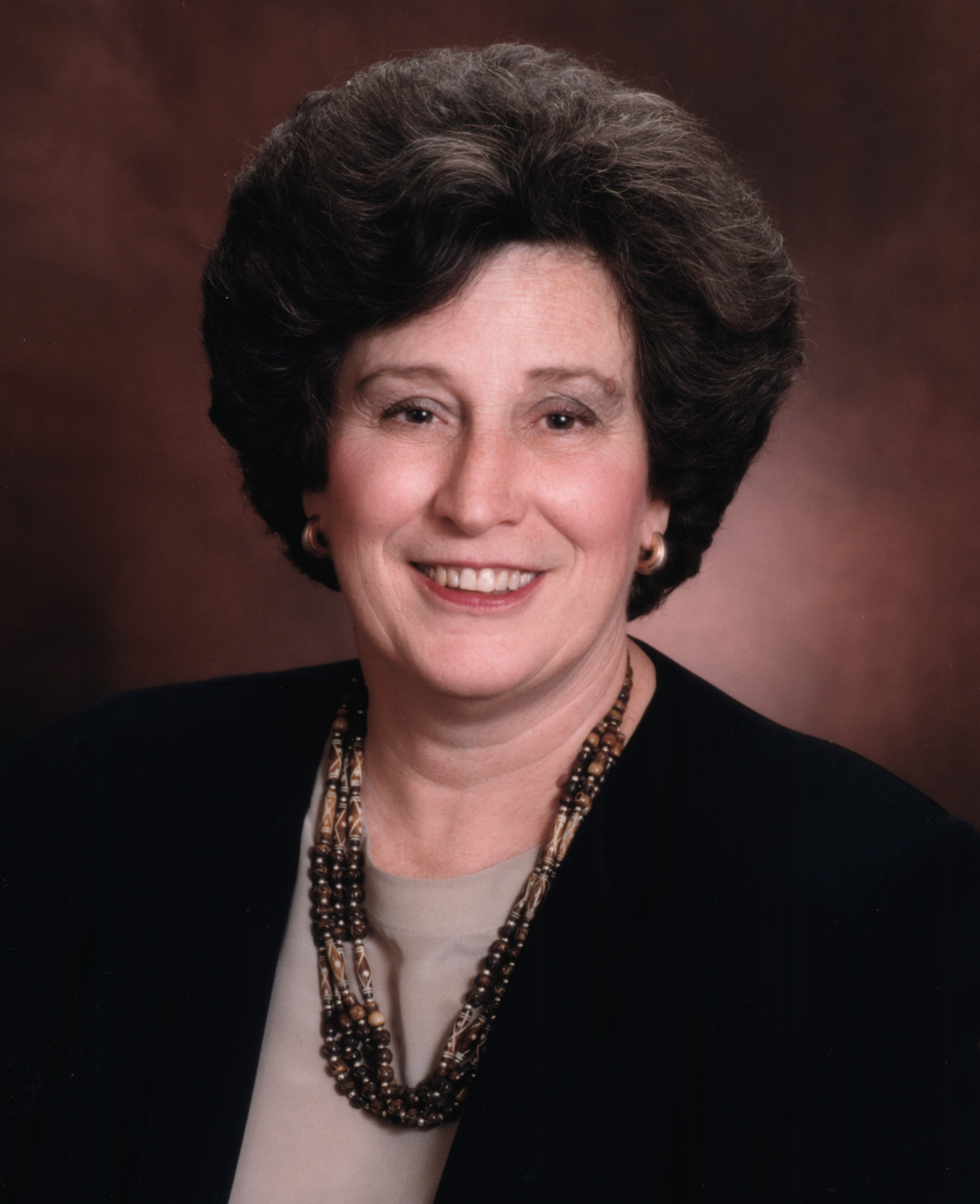
- Born: February 10, 1943; Williston Park, New York
- Died: July 10, 2019 (aged 76)
- Education: St. Lawrence University (BS in Biology), University of Rochester (PhD in Anatomy)
- Occupations: Biologist, University Administrator
- Employer(s): Tuft's University, Texas Tech University, University of Illinois at Chicago, University at Albany, Queen's University
- Known for: Cell and developmental biology
- Spouse: Murray Blair
- Website: albany.edu/citizenlaureate/karen-r-hitchcock-phd

Karen R. Hitchcock (February 10, 1943 – July 10, 2019) was an American biologist and university administrator who had leadership positions at an American and a Canadian university. She served as the president of SUNY's University at Albany in Albany, New York, from 1996 until her resignation in 2003. She was principal and vice-chancellor of Queen's University, in Kingston, Ontario from 2004 until an abrupt resignation in 2008, when she announced her departure in a sudden email to students. After her sudden departure from Queen's University, she returned, with husband Murray Blair, to the Albany, New York, area to live in Vischer Ferry.

== Education and early career ==
Hitchcock was born in 1943 in Williston Park, New York, a suburb of New York City on Long Island, the daughter of Roy Clinton Hitchcock and Ruth Wardell Hitchcock. She attended Mineola High School and went to prom with Robert A. Bauman, Ed.D.

Hitchcock received a B.S. degree in Biology from St. Lawrence University in 1964, and a Ph.D. degree in Anatomy from the University of Rochester in 1969. As a Postdoctoral Fellow, she did work in pulmonary cell biology at The Webb-Waring Institute for Medical Research at the University of Colorado Health Sciences Center.

Hitchcock continued her career at Boston's Tufts University, serving as the George A. Bates Professor of Histology and Chair of the Department of Anatomy and Cellular Biology in the Schools of Medicine, Dental Medicine, Veterinary Medicine and the Sackler School of Graduate Biomedical Sciences over a course of 15 years. At Tufts, Hitchcock met and, after his divorce, married Murray Blair, her dean at the School of Medicine. From there she moved to the Texas Tech University Health Sciences Center and then to the University of Illinois at Chicago.

In her early academic career, Hitchcock published in the field of cell and developmental biology. She received the National Science Foundation Professorship for Women in Science and Engineering (1983–84).

She served as the 67th president of the American Association of Anatomists from 1990 to 1991.

== University at Albany, SUNY ==
Hitchcock joined the University at Albany, part of the State University of New York system, in 1991 as Vice President for Academic Affairs. During that time, she brought to fruition the formation of the university's College of Arts and Sciences; oversaw the university's sesquicentennial celebration; implemented a substantial revision of the campus's General Education Program; developed an enrollment management plan across all academic units; created a "Presidential Scholars" program at the undergraduate level and founded the Center for Excellence in Teaching and Learning.

In 1995, she was named interim President and assumed the Presidency in 1996, Albany's 16th President and the first woman to hold that position in the history of the university.

Under her leadership from 1996 to 2003, the university expanded the possibilities of its educational mission among networks associated with its growing cadre of regional, state, national, and global partners. Recruitment and retention of students added to Albany's reputation as hosting an increasingly diverse student body, while also enhancing its high academic profile. Successful educational initiatives such as "Project Renaissance" added to the university's reputation and attracted steadily increasing numbers of applicants to its undergraduate programs; at the same time, Hitchcock's spearheading of programs in nano-technology and health-related programs expanded not only the university's reputation for excellence, but also its literal footprint.

During the early years of her presidency, Empire Commons was built, Division I athletic programs implemented, and the New York Giants made UAlbany their summer training camp for over ten years. On campus, a new Life Sciences Building and an Art/Sculpture facility improved opportunities for merging research with classroom instruction across a variety of disciplines. Finally, the university's "East Campus" in Rensselaer - now known as the Health Sciences Campus - in conjunction with the state's support for a Center of Excellence in Cancer Genomics and the addition of a campus devoted to the School of Public Health and health-related research and academic programs, led to substantive advancements in biotechnology and biomedical sciences.

=== Ethics inquiry ===
In October 2003, the Albany Times Union reported that tensions between Hitchcock and the SUNY Chancellor had crested, leaving her future with the University uncertain. Hitchcock abruptly resigned from her post, citing recent bids for presidencies at the University of Florida and University of Tennessee. Media speculation around those failed candidacies centered on the SUNY Chancellor's wresting of the highly touted Sematech North from Hitchcock's control.

On February 25, 2005, The New York Times reported that Hitchcock faced a state ethics inquiry about allegations that she had offered to deliver a multimillion-dollar non-competitive student housing construction contract to a hand-selected developer. In exchange, the developer had supposedly agreed to provide Hitchcock with an endowed professorship which she would hold exclusively once she was forced out of the presidency. This alleged scheme came about because Hitchcock had reportedly been informed by the then-Chancellor of the SUNY system, Robert King, of her pending termination as President. The endowed chair reportedly would have made up the difference between her salary as president and the salary of a biology professor. The ethics allegations were referred to the New York State Ethics Commission by King, with the support of the SUNY Board of Trustees. But before the Commission could convene their inquiry, the investigation became known to Hitchcock, and she abruptly resigned from SUNY Albany, allegedly to escape liability since the New York Ethics Commission would be unable to take action against someone who is not a state employee. Safely out of reach of the Ethics Commission, Hitchcock, through her lawyer, claimed to have approached George Pataki, then the Governor of the State of New York, asking for the case to be reopened and investigated in order to "clear her name"; the Ethics Commission, in fact, had no authority to investigate her after her resignation. Queen's University had hired lawyers to ensure the university was not defamed, and the Queen's search committee claimed they had been satisfied with Hitchcock's version of the story.

While at SUNY Albany, Hitchcock had also co-hosted a weekly radio show called "The Best of Our Knowledge" on an independent local public radio station (WAMC) founded and run by one of Hitchcock's faculty members at SUNY Albany, Alan S. Chartock. This program was paid for by the SUNY Albany Foundation, using gifts intended for the students and faculty of the university, until Dr. Hitchcock's abrupt departure from that campus. For some time afterward, her participation in the program was paid for by Queen's University. Chartock, a vocal political opponent of then-Governor George Pataki, delivered a number of print and broadcast defenses of Hitchcock, in which Chartock failed to mention his financial reliance on her patronage.

== Queen's University ==
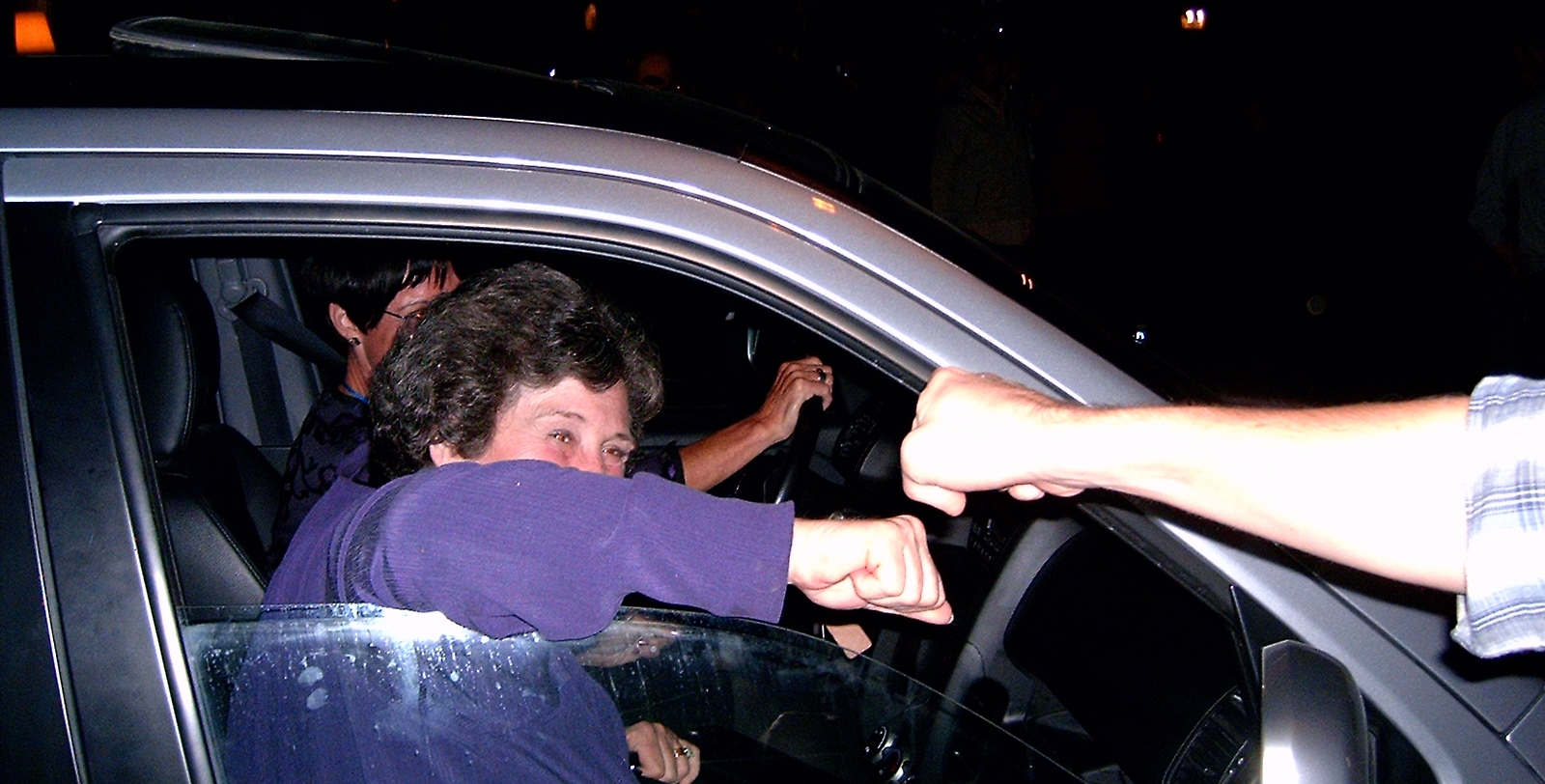
Karen Hitchcock greeting a student during Queen's University Homecoming Weekend

Hitchcock became the Principal of Queen's University in July, 2004. Queen's University is one of Canada's most prominent universities, according to several national and international rankings, such as Maclean's magazine, The Globe and Mail, and The Times Higher Educational Supplement (THES), and Hitchcock was notable both as an American import and as that institution's first female Principal.

At the beginning of her term as Principal, Hitchcock pushed for a major and controversial new infrastructure project, the Queen's Centre. It was to be the largest project undertaken by a Canadian university to that time, encompassing expanded and upgraded sports facilities, a student life centre and a new academic building. The project had a budget of $230 million, and was scheduled to take nearly a decade to complete. Groundbreaking took place two and a half years later, in February, 2007. Within fourteen months, the massive project would be 20% over budget.

Soon after Hitchcock arrived at Queen's University, she began taking extended leaves of absence, ostensibly to tend to her husband, Murray Blair, who by that time required the use of a wheelchair. Despite campus disgruntlement with her absences, Hitchcock applied for a second five-year term as Queen's principal in January, 2008.

=== Applies for reappointment, then abruptly resigns ===
Hitchcock came under increasing fire for her lack of leadership and high degree of invisibility in the Queen's community. She was also criticized by donors, alumni, faculty and community leaders for the growing financial crisis surrounding the lavish Queen's Centre project, which was already some $38 million (nearly 20%) over budget only 14 months after it began its 10-year construction.

On March 4, 2008, two months after Hitchcock applied for reappointment, the Assembly of the AMS, the Queen's University undergraduate student government, unanimously passed a motion stating their opposition to her reappointment, forwarding this recommendation to the Queen's University committee studying the matter.

Hitchcock's initial five-year term was slated to end on June 30, 2009. On April 16, 2008, only four months after seeking reappointment and a month after the unanimous rejection by students, Hitchcock suddenly withdrew her request for reappointment in an email to faculty, staff, and students and announced her resignation, to become effective two weeks later, on April 30, 2008, fourteen months before the scheduled end of her term.

In October, 2008, Hitchcock briefly rejoined Queen's University as an unpaid fellow in the university's School of Policy Studies, Centre for the Study of Democracy, which is headed by Thomas Axworthy, before retiring to a farm at Vischer Ferry, New York, north of Albany.

== Later life and death ==
Hitchcock's husband, Murray Blair, subsequently died in February, 2010. She died after a long illness on July 10, 2019, at age 76.

Academic offices
Preceded by H. Patrick Swygert	President of University at Albany, SUNY; July 1, 1995 – November 7, 1996 (Acting); November 8, 1996 – January 31, 2004	Succeeded by Carlos E. Santiago (Acting)
Preceded by William C. Leggett	Principal of Queen's University; July 1, 2004 – April 30, 2008	Succeeded by Thomas R. Williams
