= Bhavin J. Shastri =

Canadian academic

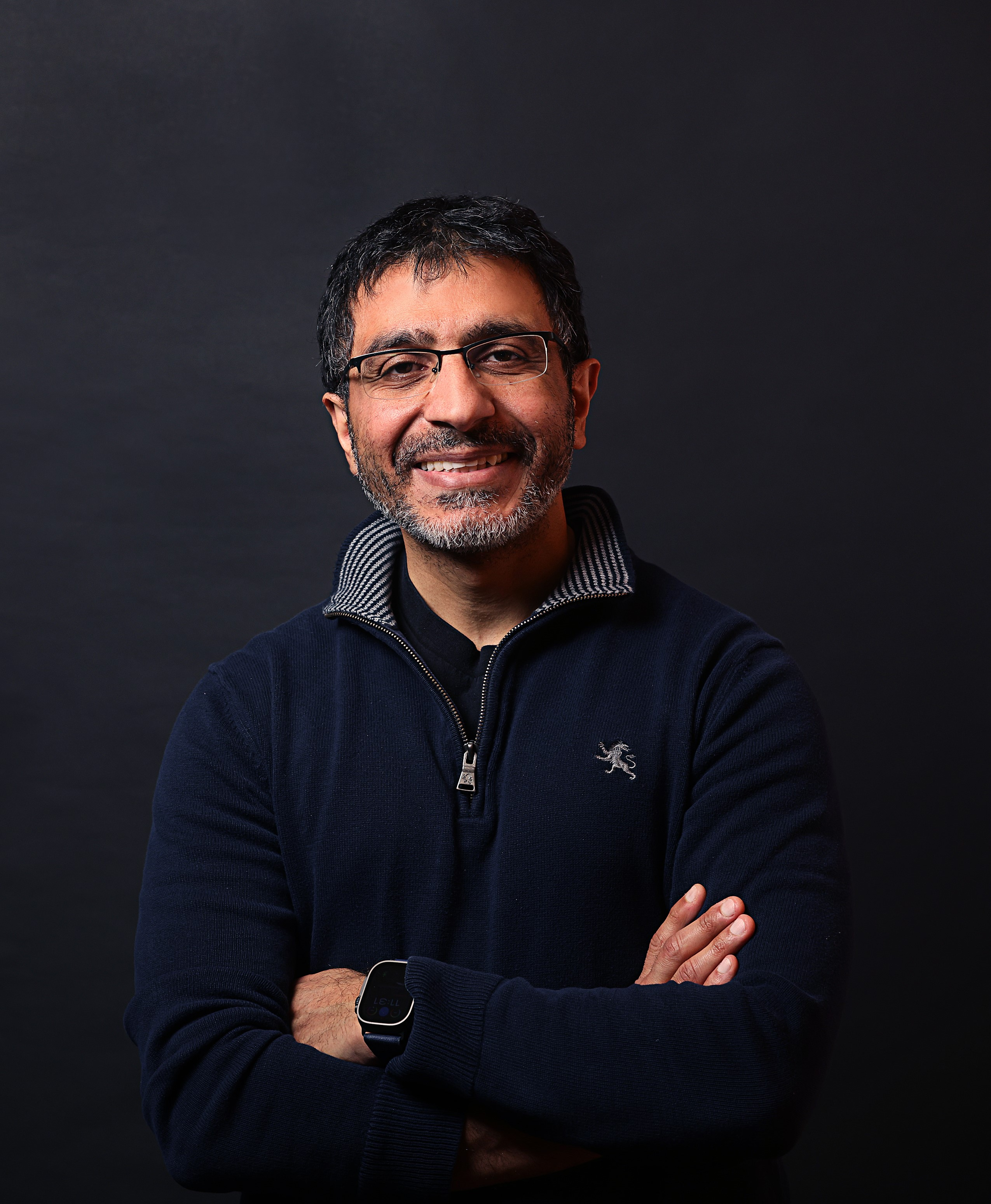
- Born: 1981 (age 44–45); Nairobi, Kenya
- Citizenship: Canadian
- Education: McGill University
- Occupation: Academic
- Known for: Neuromorphic computing; Optical computing; Neuromorphic photonics
- Awards: Sloan Research Fellowship (2025); Member of the College, Royal Society of Canada (2024); Canada Research Chair in Neuromorphic Photonic Computing (2024); SPIE Early Career Achievement Awards (2022); IUPAP Young Scientist Prize (2021)
- Scientific career
- Fields: Photonics, Computing
- Workplaces: Queen's University; Princeton University; ETH Zürich
- Website: https://www.queensu.ca/physics/shastrilab/

Bhavin J. Shastri (born 1981) is a Kenyan-Canadian academic of Indian origin, specializing in nanophotonics, photonic integrated circuits, and neuromorphic computing. He holds the Canada Research Chair in neuromorphic photonic computing and is a faculty member in Physics, Engineering Physics & Astronomy at Queen's University at Kingston.

Shastri is a Member of the College of the Royal Society of Canada and holds a cross-appointment in Electrical and Computer Engineering at Queen's University. He also serves as the co-director of NUCLEUS, a pan-Canadian photonic computing program funded by NSERC CREATE.

== Early life and education ==
Bhavin J. Shastri was born in Nairobi, Kenya, in 1981. He attended McGill University, where he earned a B.Eng. with distinction in electrical engineering in 2005, followed by an M.Eng. in 2007, and a Ph.D. in 2012, all specializing in photonics.

== Career ==
From 2014 to 2016, Shastri was a Banting Postdoctoral Fellow and from 2012 to 2014 he was an NSERC Postdoctoral Fellow at Princeton University, where he worked under the guidance of Paul Prucnal. He then served as an Associate Research Scholar at Princeton from May 2016 to June 2018 and continues to serve as a Visiting Research Collaborator since July 2018.

In December 2020, Shastri became a faculty affiliate at the Vector Institute.

In 2024, Shastri was appointed as the scientific co-director of the NUCLEUS CREATE Program under NSERC. He was also appointed to the Canada Research Chair in Neuromorphic Photonic Computing, in the same year.

In September 2024, Shastri was inducted into the Royal Society of Canada.

== Research ==
Shastri is recognized as a pioneer in the field of neuromorphic photonics, a term he co-coined.

Shastri's research investigates computation using photonics rather than electronics. His work examines how photonic systems can enable neuromorphic and quantum neural network computing. Photonic computers may offer improvements in speed and energy efficiency compared to electronic systems, potentially addressing challenges in combinatorial optimization and artificial intelligence, among other applications.

In 2024, Shastri and his team developed an optical neural network (ONN) that isolates specific transmissions and identifies signals in real time with a processing delay of less than 15 picoseconds. The ONN also operates at significantly lower power consumption than comparable electronic systems. In the same year, Shastri and his collaborators demonstrated a photonic tensor core capable of performing over 120 billion operations per second and supporting in situ neural network training with weight updates at 60 GHz.

== Selected publications ==
- Lin, Zhongjin; Shastri, Bhavin J.; Yu, Shangxuan; Song, Jingxiang; Zhu, Yuntao; Safarnejadian, Arman; Cai, Wangning; Lin, Yanmei; Ke, Wei; Hammood, Mustafa; Wang, Tianye; Xu, Mengyue; Zheng, Zibo; Al-Qadasi, Mohammed; Esmaeeli, Omid; Rahim, Mohamed; Pakulski, Grzegorz; Schmid, Jens; Barrios, Pedro; Jiang, Weihong; Morison, Hugh; Mitchell, Matthew; Guan, Xun; Jaeger, Nicolas A. F.; Rusch, Leslie A.; Shekhar, Sudip; Shi, Wei; Yu, Siyuan; Cai, Xinlun; Chrostowski, Lukas (October 21, 2024). "120 GOPS Photonic tensor core in thin-film lithium niobate for inference and in situ training". Nature Communications. 15 (1): 9081. arXiv:2311.16896. doi:10.1038/s41467-024-53261-x – via www.nature.com.
- Shekhar, Sudip; Bogaerts, Wim; Chrostowski, Lukas; Bowers, John E.; Hochberg, Michael; Soref, Richard; Shastri, Bhavin J. (January 25, 2024). "Roadmapping the next generation of silicon photonics". Nature Communications. 15 (1): 751. arXiv:2305.15820. doi:10.1038/s41467-024-44750-0 – via www.nature.com.
- Zhang, Weipeng; Lederman, Joshua C.; Ferreira de Lima, Thomas; Zhang, Jiawei; Bilodeau, Simon; Hudson, Leila; Tait, Alexander; Shastri, Bhavin J.; Prucnal, Paul R. (January 9, 2024). "A system-on-chip microwave photonic processor solves dynamic RF interference in real time with picosecond latency". Light: Science & Applications. 13 (1): 14. arXiv:2306.14727. doi:10.1038/s41377-023-01362-5 – via www.nature.com.
- Zhang, Weipeng; Tait, Alexander; Huang, Chaoran; Ferreira de Lima, Thomas; Bilodeau, Simon; Blow, Eric C.; Jha, Aashu; Shastri, Bhavin J.; Prucnal, Paul (February 27, 2023). "Broadband physical layer cognitive radio with an integrated photonic processor for blind source separation". Nature Communications. 14 (1): 1107. doi:10.1038/s41467-023-36814-4. PMC 9971366 – via www.nature.com.
- Ewaniuk, Jacob; Carolan, Jacques; Shastri, Bhavin J.; Rotenberg, Nir (February 18, 2023). "Imperfect Quantum Photonic Neural Networks". Advanced Quantum Technologies. 6 (3) 2200125. arXiv:2208.06571. doi:10.1002/qute.202200125 – via Wiley Online Library.
- Huang, Chaoran; Fujisawa, Shinsuke; de Lima, Thomas Ferreira; Tait, Alexander N.; Blow, Eric C.; Tian, Yue; Bilodeau, Simon; Jha, Aashu; Yaman, Fatih; Peng, Hsuan-Tung; Batshon, Hussam G.; Shastri, Bhavin J.; Inada, Yoshihisa; Wang, Ting; Prucnal, Paul R. (November 18, 2021). "A silicon photonic–electronic neural network for fibre nonlinearity compensation". Nature Electronics. 4 (11): 837–844. arXiv:2110.12833. doi:10.1038/s41928-021-00661-2 – via www.nature.com.
- Shastri, Bhavin J.; Tait, Alexander N.; Ferreira de Lima, T.; Pernice, Wolfram H. P.; Bhaskaran, Harish; Wright, C. D.; Prucnal, Paul R. (February 18, 2021). "Photonics for artificial intelligence and neuromorphic computing". Nature Photonics. 15 (2): 102–114. arXiv:2011.00111. doi:10.1038/s41566-020-00754-y – via www.nature.com.
- Tait, Alexander N.; de Lima, Thomas Ferreira; Zhou, Ellen; Wu, Allie X.; Nahmias, Mitchell A.; Shastri, Bhavin J.; Prucnal, Paul R. (August 7, 2017). "Neuromorphic photonic networks using silicon photonic weight banks". Scientific Reports. 7 (1): 7430. arXiv:1611.02272. doi:10.1038/s41598-017-07754-z – via www.nature.com.

== Books ==
- P. R. Prucnal and B. J. Shastri, Neuromorphic Photonics, CRC Press, Taylor & Francis, Boca Raton, Florida (2017).

== Selected awards and recognition ==
- 2020: IUPAP Young Scientist Prize in Optics
- 2022: SPIE Early Career Achievement Award
- 2022: iCANX Young Scientist Award
- 2024: Science News (SN) 10 Scientist to Watch
- 2024: Member of the College, the Royal Society of Canada
- 2024: Canada Research Chair in Neuromorphic Photonic Computing
- 2025: Sloan Research Fellowship
