= Christine Friedenreich =

Canadian cancer epidemiologist

Christine Marthe Friedenreich, FRSC, is a Canadian cancer epidemiologist whose research focuses on the role of physical activity in the development and moderation of cancer. In 2019, Friedenreich was inducted as a Fellow of the Royal Society of Canada for her contributions to science over the decades. Friedenreich was the first Canadian to receive the Rosalind E. Franklin award from the National Cancer Institute. Friedenreich was also the scientific director for the Department of Cancer Epidemiology and Prevention Research at Alberta Health Services, headquartered in Edmonton, Canada.

== Education ==
Friedenreich completed her undergraduate and post graduate studies and research in Canada. For undergraduate studies, Friedenreich attended Queen's University at Kingston, where she obtained her Bachelor of Science degree in life sciences in 1982. She also earned her Masters of Science in community health and epidemiology from Queen's University at Kingston. Friedenreich went on to complete her doctorate study in epidemiology at the University of Toronto in 1990.

== Career and research ==
Friedenreich began studying the role of physical activity in the development of cancer in the 1990s. Since then, she has conducted over 40 studies showing the benefits of physical activity in the reduction of risk to cancer and improved rehabilitation after cancer diagnosis. She has published hundreds of academic papers and her works have been cited over 12,000 times. She led the ALPHA trial (Alberta Physical Activity and Breast Cancer Prevention Trial), the first intervention trial for exercise and breast cancer prevention in Canada. The Alpha trial, which began in 2003, evaluated how a consistent year long exercise routine influenced biomarkers associated with breast cancer. This study included 320 post menopausal women. Friedenreich also conducted the BETA trial (Breast Cancer and Exercise Trial in Alberta) in 2010. The BETA trial analyzed how 150 and 300 minutes of weekly aerobic exercise impacted body fat levels and associated breast cancer biomarkers in 400 women. The randomized selection of women who exercised for 300 minutes a week were more likely to lose body fat compared to women who exercised for 150 minutes a week. Friedenreich worked with the World Health Organization to establish new physical activity guidelines in 2020. She continues to conduct research and teach in Canada.

== Positions ==
Friedenreich was the scientific director for the Department of Cancer Epidemiology and Prevention Research at Alberta Health Services. Friedenreich retired from Alberta Health Services in 2024. She is an adjunct professor and division head at the Cumming School of Medicine in the Department of Community Health Sciences and Oncology. She also held leadership positions at O'Brien Institute for Public Health as the interim Scientific Director.

== Honors and awards ==
In 2019, Friedenreich joined the Royal Society of Canada in the division of life sciences. She was awarded the Canadian Cancer Society's O. Harold Warwick Prize in 2013. She was given the Canadian Society for Epidemiology and Biostatistics distinguished service award in 2013. In 2022, Friedenreich became the first Canadian to receive the Rosalind E. Franklin award from the National Cancer Institute.
