= James Corry (political scientist) =

Canadian academic (1899–1985)

James Corry CC

Principal of Queen's University
- In office 1961–1968
- Preceded by: William Archibald Mackintosh
- Succeeded by: John James Deutsch

Personal details
- Born: James Alexander Corry; 1899 Millbank, Ontario, Canada
- Died: December 26, 1985 (aged 85–86) Kingston, Ontario, Canada

James Alexander Corry CC (1899 – December 26, 1985) was a Canadian academic and the thirteenth Principal of Queen's University, Ontario, from 1961 until 1968.

Born in Millbank, Ontario, he graduated in 1923 from the University of Saskatchewan. He attended Lincoln College, Oxford as a Rhodes Scholar. In 1927 he became a professor of law at the University of Saskatchewan. In 1936 he joined Queen's University as a professor of political science. In 1957, when the Queen's Faculty of Law was re-established with his assistance, he was one of the three charter professors, along with Daniel Soberman and Stuart Ryan. From 1951 until 1961 he was a Vice-Principal of Queen's. Mackintosh-Corry Hall at Queen's is co-named in his honour.

== Honours ==
- He was a Fellow of the Royal Society of Canada.
- He received honorary degrees from 14 universities, including Sir George Williams University (1973), which later became Concordia University.
- In 1968 he was made a Companion of the Order of Canada.
