= Ronald Lampman Watts =

Canadian academic

- Born: March 10, 1929; Karuizawa, Japan
- Died: October 9, 2015 (aged 86); Kingston, Ontario, Canada
- Education: Trinity College, Toronto (BA); Oriel College, Oxford (BA, MA, DPhil)
- Awards: Order of Canada

Ronald Lampman Watts CC FRSC (March 10, 1929 − October 9, 2015) was a Canadian academic, who served as the 15th Principal and Vice-chancellor of Queen's University from 1974 until 1984.

Born in Karuizawa, Japan, to Canadian missionary parents. Educated at the Yokohama International School immediately prior to the outbreak of the Second World War. Watts received his Bachelor of Arts from Trinity College in the University of Toronto in 1952, and then went to Oriel College, Oxford University on a Rhodes Scholarship where he had Kenneth Wheare as his mentor. He was a Brother of the Toronto Chapter of the Alpha Delta Phi. He received a BA at Oxford in 1954, an MA in 1959, and a D. Phil. in 1962. He joined Queen's as a lecturer in Philosophy in 1955, transferred to the Department of Political and Economic Science in 1961, became the Dean of the Faculty of Arts and Science in 1969, and principal in 1974. From 1988 to 1993 he was the Director of the Queen's University Institute of Intergovernmental Relations.

In 1979 he was made an Officer of the Order of Canada, and was promoted to Companion in 2000.

Watts died on October 9, 2015, at the age of 86 in Kingston, Ontario, Canada.

== Publications ==
- Watts, Ronald L.: Comparing Federal Systems. Queen's Policy Studies Series. Third edition, McGill-Queen's University Press 2008.
- Blindenbacher, R. and Watts, R.: Federalism in a Changing World – A Conceptual Framework for the Conference. In: Blindenbacher, R. and Koller, A.: Federalism in a Changing World – Learning from Each Other. McGill-Queens University Press 2003.

Academic offices
Preceded by John James Deutsch	Principal of Queen's University; 1974–1984	Succeeded by David Chadwick Smith
