= David Chadwick Smith =

Canadian economist

David Chadwick Smith CM FRSC (August 12, 1931 – May 22, 2000) was a Canadian economist, and the sixteenth Principal of Queen's University from 1984 to 1994.

Smith was born in Ootacamund, British India to Canadian parents who were Baptist missionaries. The family moved back to the Simcoe area of Ontario when he was eight years old. He was educated at McMaster University, Oxford University, and Harvard University and then taught at University of California, Berkeley before coming to Queen's in 1961, joining the Department of Economics.

In 1993, he was made a member of the Order of Canada. He was made a fellow of the Royal Society of Canada in 1976.

Academic offices
Preceded by Ronald Lampman Watts	Principal of Queen's University; 1984–1994	Succeeded by William C. Leggett
