= John James Deutsch =

Canadian economist

John James Deutsch CC (26 February 1911 – March 18, 1976) was a Canadian economist who served as the first chairman of the Economic Council of Canada, and as principal (1968–74) of Queen's University.

Born in Quinton, Saskatchewan, and educated at Queen's, he worked in journalism and in government, as well as at the university. In 1947 Prime Minister William Lyon Mackenzie King asked Deutsch to negotiate a trade agreement with the United States, that would have produced a sweeping liberalization of Canada-U.S. trade, had it not in the end been repudiated by King's government. He subsequently became an economics professor at Queen's, and then the university's vice-principal (administration), before being selected as principal.

In 1966, he received an honorary doctorate from Sir George Williams University, which later became Concordia University.

During his term as Principal, Queen's underwent a substantial expansion of its infrastructure, to meet the increased demands of the baby boomer generation, which was growing towards university enrollment age. A new stadium, a new athletics complex, a new student union building, new residence accommodation, and several new academic buildings were all opened under Deutsch's leadership.

Deutsch, who died in 1976, is remembered at Queen's through the John Deutsch University Centre (JDUC), the student union building, and through the John Deutsch Institute for the Study of Economic Policy, in the university's department of economics. A large banner, containing hoods from his 23 honorary degrees, is prominently displayed in the JDUC.

In 1969 he was made a Companion of the Order of Canada.

Academic offices
Preceded by James Corry	Principal of Queen's University; 1968–1974	Succeeded by Ronald Lampman Watts
