= Golden Words =

Humour publication in Ontario, Canada

- The February 3, 2010 front page of Golden Words
- Type: Weekly newspaper
- Format: Broadsheet
- Owner: Engineering Society of Queen’s University
- Founded: Kingston, Ontario 1967
- Headquarters: Clark Hall, Queen's University, Kingston, Ontario K7J 3N6
- Circulation: 4 000 weekly
- Price: Free
- Website: goldenwords.ca

Golden Words is a weekly humour publication produced by students at Queen's University at Kingston in Kingston, Ontario, Canada. It claims to be the only humour weekly in Canada.

The paper was founded by the Engineering Society in 1967 to give the Engineering Society a voice on campus. Its first cartoon contained an Engineer reading a copy of the Queen's Journal, thinking to himself "Oh, what crap is this?" It has been published more or less continuously since inception, appearing every Wednesday for most of the Fall and Winter terms, unless the editors have tricked the readers into believing it had been shut down (as was the case in November 1985). Recent volumes have run 24 issues.

Along with the Queen's Journal, it is one of the two main student-run publications on campus, and claims a circulation of roughly 4,000 copies.

The paper's humour style reflects its motto: "Sola Veritas Est Qui Facit Ut Me in Merda", which translates to "Only The Truth Gets Me In Shit". Its printed humour is diverse, running the gamut from absurdist sketches and short stories to political satire and commentary on current events. Practical jokes have also figured prominently in its history, and are typically revealed in subsequent issues. Published parodies have included Queen's Journal (often appearing more than 24 hours early to coincide with the Journal's publication day), the Queen's Gazette (for faculty and staff), the Kingston Whig-Standard, and a national newspaper, The Globe and Mail. (When parodied in the 1980s, The Globe and Mail itself reported that the engineers had actually inserted the ersatz versions into the coin boxes in the Globe's own lobby.)

In September 1989, the masthead staff stole the Greasepole (an engineering icon) from the first year students charged with protecting it - and ransomed it back to them for 100 cases of beer. The paper maintains a friendly rivalry with the Journal.

Although Golden Words is owned by the Engineering Society, the paper attracts contributors (writers, artists, and editorial staff) from across the undergraduate population.

Notable Golden Words alumni include humourist Jay Pinkerton, game designer Erin Robinson, screenwriter Elan Mastai, 1000 Awesome Things author Neil Pasricha, and Robertson Davies.

== See also ==
- List of student newspapers in Canada
- List of newspapers in Canada
- Harvard Lampoon
