= William Snodgrass (minister) =

William Snodgrass (4 September 1827 – 22 July 1906) was a Canadian Presbyterian minister and the sixth Principal of Queen's College, now Queen's University.

Under his tenure, the position of chancellor and the university council were created, the Queen's Journal released its first issue, and Queen's was yet again saved from financial ruin through an aggressive and very successful fundraising campaign.

Academic offices
Preceded by William Leitch	Principal of Queen's College at Kingston; 1864–1877	Succeeded by George Monro Grant
