= Giles Gherson =

Canadian politician

- Born: London, England
- Employer: Ontario government

Giles Gherson is a Canadian civil servant and journalist. He was editor-in-chief of the Edmonton Journal and Toronto Star newspapers. He has worked as a civil servant in the Ontario government since 2007 and is currently the Deputy Minister of Ontario's Ministry of Economic Development and Growth and Ministry of Research, Innovation and Science.

== Early life ==
Gherson and a twin sister were born in London, England to Joan and Randolph Gherson.

He earned a BA in history from Queen's University in 1978. He worked on the campus newspaper, The Queen's Journal.

== Career ==
=== Journalism ===
Gherson worked as a journalist for more than 20 years. He was business editor of The Globe and Mail, editor-in-chief of the Edmonton Journal and political editor of the National Post. From 2004 to 2006 he was editor-in-chief of the Toronto Star.

=== Civil service ===
Gherson was principal secretary for social security reform with the Canadian Government at Human Resources Development Canada. He was appointed Deputy Minister of Communications and the Ontario Government's Associate Secretary of the Cabinet on 8 March 2007.

In July 2008, Gherson was appointed Deputy Minister of Policy and Delivery and Associate Secretary of the Cabinet, and in November 2011, he became Deputy Minister of Government and Consumer Services.

Gherson was appointed Deputy Minister of Research and Innovation and Deputy Minister of Economic Development and Infrastructure in September 2014, and Deputy Minister Responsible for Small Business in January 2017.

After 15 years with the Ontario government he joined the Toronto Region Board of Trade, becoming President and Chief Executive Officer.

=== Board memberships ===
Gherson serves on the board of directors of Toronto Financial Service Alliance (TFSA). He is an observer to the board of Next Generation Manufacturing (NGM) Canada. He is an ex officio member of the board of Communitech.

== Personal life ==
Gherson lives in Toronto, Ontario.
