= Smith Engineering =

Engineering school of Queen's University at Kingston

Stephen J.R. Smith Faculty of Engineering and Applied Science at Queen’s University
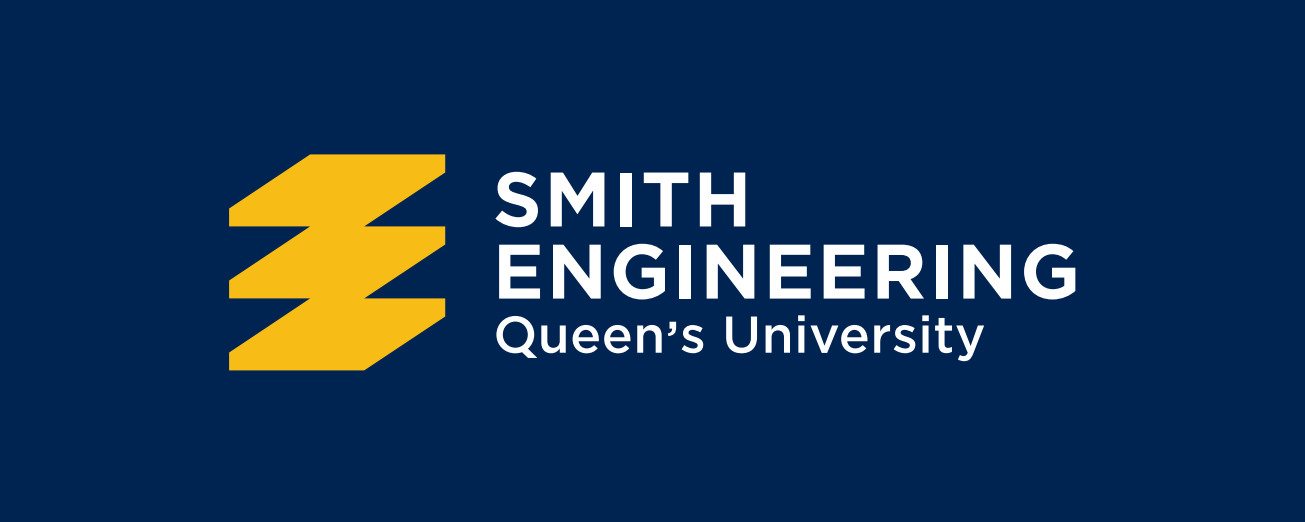
- Former names: Kingston School of Mining (1893–1910); Queen's University Faculty of Applied Science (1910–2010); Queen's University Faculty of Engineering and Applied Science (2010–2023)
- Type: Public engineering school
- Established: 1893; 133 years ago
- Parent institution: Queen's University at Kingston
- Dean: Kevin Deluzio
- Location: Kingston, Ontario, Canada
- Website: smithengineering.queensu.ca

The Stephen J.R. Smith Faculty of Engineering and Applied Science at Queen’s University, commonly known as Smith Engineering, is the engineering faculty at Queen's University at Kingston, located in Kingston, Ontario, Canada. The faculty offers undergraduate, master's, and doctoral degrees in engineering and has partnered with other faculties within the university to offer dual degrees.

The faculty was founded in 1893 as the Kingston School of Mining and joined with Queen's University in 1910. In 2023, the faculty was renamed in honour of Stephen Smith, a former alumnus of the university and donor.

== History ==
In 1893, the Ontario government established the Kingston School of Mining, coinciding with the location of Queen's University at Kingston, but existing legally as a separate institution. When Queen's became a secular institution in 1910, the School of Mining officially joined with the university and subsequently renamed itself the Faculty of Applied Science.

The first woman graduated from the faculty in 1946. As of 2023, 27% of the undergraduate engineering students are women, one of the highest percentages of any major engineering program in the country.

In 2010, the Faculty of Applied Science was re-branded, after a vote throughout the faculty, as the Faculty of Engineering & Applied Science.

In 2021, Queens University Engineering joined with the University of Waterloo, University of Toronto, McMaster University and University of Western Ontario to form an academic partnership called the IBET PhD Project, to increase academic and industry diversity by creating new fellowships for Indigenous and Black students pursuing doctoral degrees in mathematics and engineering to prepare for careers as professors and industry researchers.

On November 2, 2023, the faculty was renamed the Stephen J.R. Smith Faculty of Engineering and Applied Science at Queen's University in recognition of a $100 million gift from Stephen J.R. Smith, a graduate of the faculty.

== Academics ==
=== Programs ===
Smith Engineering offers the following programs:

- Dual Degrees (Students can opt to take an Art-Science program concurrent with their Engineering program, which usually requires an additional year of study)
- Mathematics & Engineering*
- Chemical Engineering
- Civil Engineering
- Computer Engineering
- Electrical Engineering
- Engineering Chemistry*
- Engineering Physics*
- Geological Engineering*
- Mechanical and Materials Engineering
- Mechatronics and Robotics Engineering
- Mining Engineering
- Engineering and Co-op

All programs marked with * are Engineering Science programs.

Most Smith Engineering students share a common first year program meaning they are not required to select a discipline until after they have completed their first year of studies. However, the Mechatronics and Robotics Engineering program as well as the Computer Engineering program is a direct entry program. Also worth noting is the creation of direct entry Mining, Chemical, Civil, and Mechanical programs all starting for the class of 2030 in 2026.

Graduate studies options include a Master's in Applied Science (MASc), a two-year research-based program, Master's in Engineering (MEng), a one-year coursework-based program, and doctoral studies (PhD), as well as graduate diplomas.

=== Limitation on years of study ===
Students registered in the Bachelor of Applied Science (Engineering) program at Queen's University are required to complete the four-year degree in no more than six academic sessions. These six years are assessed as terms in which the student is actively registered. A student who has not completed the degree program in six years will normally be required to withdraw. An extension will normally be granted to students who have completed, or are working on an Internship, Exchange, or are enrolled in a Dual Degree program, or have received accommodation through the Queen's Disability Services office due to a disability. Requests for an extension are submitted to the Faculty Office and considered by the Operations Committee -Academic Progress.

== Student culture ==
=== Engineering Society ===
Formed in 1896, the Engineering Society of Queen's University, often known as EngSoc, is one of the oldest representative bodies for engineering students in Canada. The society includes all active engineering students on campus as well as alumni. Annually, the society has a budget of $1.2 million, which is used in day-to-day services as well as design projects and social events. The Engineering Society also publishes the weekly humour newspaper, Golden Words.

=== Engineering traditions ===
==== "Purpling" and jackets ====
A known tradition within the faculty of undergraduate students is the dyeing of themselves as well as their gold-coloured leather jackets purple with gentian violet. The process is colloquially known as "purpling". Full-body purpling is done by second-year students who are involved in frosh week facilitation, called "FRECs", an acronym derived from "Frosh Regulation Enforcement Committee", although the original term remains only as a historical note.

A side effect of full-body dyeing resulted in colour rubbing off and bleeding on furniture and surfaces within university residences and cafeterias, so as a result, first-year students were banned from partaking in 1990. However, frosh are known to purple themselves during homecoming weekend on the Saturday morning preceding the football game.

The purpling of jackets by frosh is considered a rite of passage, performed two nights before their final exam of the fall term, immediately after getting their jackets and kicking them home. The jackets are literally kicked back to their residences or homes, as frosh cannot touch the jackets with their hands until they have finished their final semester 1 exam. This has stemmed the tradition of upper years playing pranks on frosh, (e.g. throwing the jackets on roofs, tying them to a pole, etc., and having the frosh find ways to get back their jackets without using their hands). Frosh will put on their jackets upon completing their final exam in the fall semester. Later that same day they make their way to Clark Hall to slam their jackets against the ground for the time it took to get the tam (a piece of headwear given to all first years) from the top of the grease pole.

In addition, badges and crests, in particular the "Pass Crest" that goes on the sleeve, may not be added to the jacket until the completion of First Year exams. After the completion of First Year, in April, students may also sew on various "bars" to their jackets. Bars are earned and ordered for a variety of events and feats. There are many bars for accomplishments, for participating in activities, such as Thundersledz (a winter frosh group event), for signifying the countries they have the most affinity with, signifying the discipline they are in, etc.

==== Grease pole climb ====
In the Fall of 1956, the class of Science '60 was forced to climb a goalpost stolen the previous year from the University of Toronto's Varsity Stadium. Over the years, this has evolved into the grease pole tradition, and led to some friendly rivalry with the University of Toronto Faculty of Applied Science and Engineering.

Currently, first-year students are led to "climb the greasepole", which is the same goalpost covered in 1-inch-thick (25 mm) industrial lanolin, surrounded by a waist-deep pit of water, commonly known as "the greasepit."

==== Science Formal ====
Another tradition is a formal dance event called "Sci Formal" (Science Formal) in which fourth-year students spend thousands of man hours constructing and transforming the interior of Grant and Kingston Halls into storybook scenery for a one-night black tie event. Some past decorations within the hall have include whole castles, churches, pyramids and a giant sphinx.

== Facilities ==
=== Clark Hall ===
Clark Hall was named after Arthur Lewis Clark, who was Dean of Applied Science for 24 years. The building houses Clark Hall Pub, the Campus Bookstore and the old EngSoc Lounge (with the new EngSoc Lounge being in Beamish-Munro Hall), which in turn hosts several student-run services such as Queen's Project on International Development, Golden Words and Campus Equipment Outfitters (CEO).

==== Clark Hall Pub ====
Clark Hall Pub is a traditional hangout of engineering students at Queen's University, although it is frequented by students of all faculties. It is run by the Queen's Engineering Society (EngSoc), and is located in Clark Hall. It was Canada's first completely student run pub.

First opened in 1971, Clark Hall Pub is the oldest pub on the Queen's campus.

In June 2007, Clark Hall Pub was closed by the Engineering Society citing concerns about management and financial clarity, but was re-open in October 2008.

Clark Hall Pub has also been home to many successful acts, including The Tragically Hip, Arcade Fire, Arkells, Bedouin Soundclash, K-os, and Craig Cardiff.

Every year a house band is chosen through a 'Battle of the Bands'-style competition, which the Tragically Hip failed to win when they were first starting out in the 1980s.

Every Friday afternoon, students from various faculties line up outside the pub to attend "Ritual," a faculty tradition.

=== Integrated Learning Centre ===
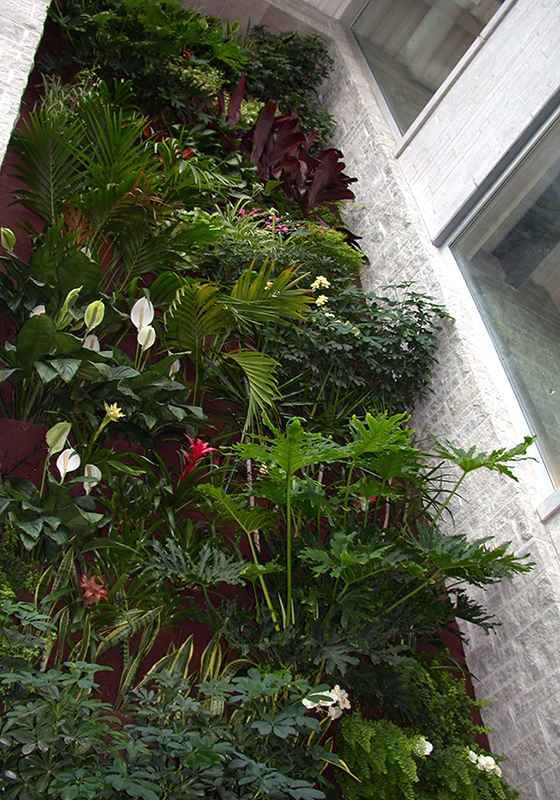
Green Wall in the Integrated Learning Centre

Smith Engineering's newest building, the Integrated Learning Centre, was officially opened in June 2004 as Beamish–Munro Hall. This facility was designed to support undergraduate learning and includes multi-purpose rooms, shared teaching laboratories, prototyping workshop rooms, space for students to work on projects together, environmentally-sustainable features, "Live Building" systems through which the building itself can be used as a learning tool, and a three-storey-high living wall to act as a biofilter. Most of the rooms as well as laboratories can be used freely, and some of them can be booked. The Tea Room, a student-run café with objectives of environmental sustainability, opened in the Integrated Learning Centre in the fall of 2006.

Following concerns of high maintenance costs, the living wall was removed in 2015, to be replaced by a piece of artwork designed by Toronto-based artist Kwest in collaboration with engineering students.

== Notable alumni ==
- Michael Serbinis (B.Sc.(Eng.) 1996) CEO and founder, Kobo, League
- Derek Muller (B.Sc.(Eng.) 2004) Science communicator, and television personality, creator of YouTube channel Veritasium
- Dalton Kellett (B.Sc.(Eng.) 2015) A. J. Foyt Enterprises Racing driver
- Donald Lindsay (B.Sc.(Eng.) 1980) -- CEO of Teck Resources Limited
- Donald Charlesworth B.Sc.(Eng.) Nuclear scientist, Atomic Energy of Canada Ltd.
- Mark Charlesworth B.Sc.(Eng.) (1981) Co-developer of CorelDraw software
- Ian Rae B.Sc.(Eng.) (1980) Co-developer of CorelDraw software
- Walter F Light B.Sc.(Eng.) (1949) Former CEO of Nortel
- Faqir Chand Kohli (B.Sc.(Eng.) 1948) Former Director of Tata Consultancy Services, the "father of the Indian software industry"
- Geoffrey Ballard (B.Sc.(Eng.) 1956) Hailed as "Master of Modern Technology" by CBC Newsworld
- Gururaj Deshpande (PhD) Founder and Chairman of Sycamore Networks, Inc. and member of the MIT Corporation.
- Alfred Bader B.Sc.(Eng.)(1945) Founder of the Sigma-Aldrich Corporation
- Denzil Doyle (B.Sc.(Eng.) 1956) Founding President of Digital Equipment Corporation's subsidiary in Canada
- Stephen J.R. Smith (B.Sc.(Eng.) 1972) Canadian businessman; co-founder of First National Financial Corporation

== See also ==
- Engineering traditions in Canada
- Iron Ring
- Women in engineering
