= George Monro Grant =

Canadian church minister and writer (1835–1902)

The Very Reverend George Monro Grant CMG FRSC
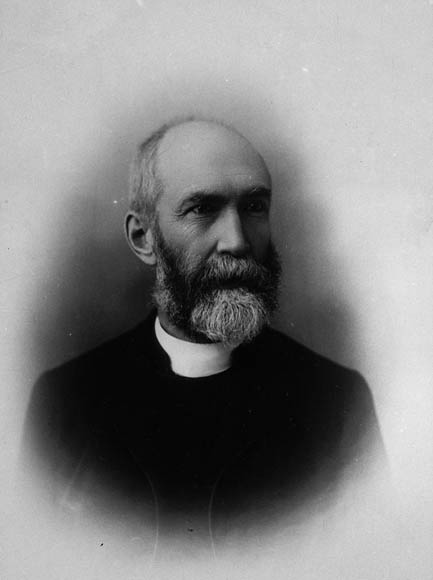
- Born: December 22, 1835; Stellarton, Nova Scotia
- Died: May 10, 1902 (aged 66); Kingston, Ontario, Canada
- Title: Principal of Queen's College at Kingston (1877–1902)
- Spouse: Jessie Lawson (m. 1872)

Ecclesiastical career
- Religion: Christianity (Presbyterian)
- Church: Church of Scotland; Synod of the Presbyterian Church of the Maritime Provinces of British North America Presbyterian Church in Canada
- Ordained: 1861

Academic background
- Education: University of Glasgow
- Influences: John Caird

George Monro Grant CMG FRSC (December 22, 1835 – May 10, 1902) was a Canadian church minister, writer, and political activist. He served as principal of Queen's College, Kingston, Ontario, for 25 years, from 1877 until 1902.

== Early life, education ==
Grant was born in Stellarton, Pictou County, Nova Scotia. He was educated at the Pictou Academy and the anti-burgher seminary in West River in Nova Scotia, and, from 1853 to 1860, in Scotland at the University of Glasgow, where he had a brilliant academic career. Having entered the ministry of the Church of Scotland in 1861, he returned to serve in Nova Scotia and Prince Edward Island, before being called to the St Matthew's congregation in Halifax, Nova Scotia, where he was minister from 1863 to 1877.

== Support of Confederation, railway development ==
He quickly gained a high reputation as a preacher and as an eloquent speaker on political subjects. In 1867, Nova Scotia was the province most strongly opposed to federal union. Grant threw the whole weight of his great influence in favour of Canadian Confederation, and his oratory played an important part in securing the success of the movement. When the consolidation of the Dominion by means of railway construction was under discussion in 1872, Grant traveled across Canada, from the Atlantic Ocean to the Pacific Ocean, with the engineers, including lifelong friend, Sir Sandford Fleming, who surveyed the route of the Canadian Pacific Railway. Grant's book Ocean to Ocean (1873) was one of the first things that opened the eyes of Canadians to the value of the immense heritage they enjoyed. He never lost an opportunity, whether in the pulpit or on the platform, of pressing on his listeners that the greatest future for Canada lay in unity with the rest of the British Empire; and his broad statesmanlike judgment made him an authority which politicians of all parties were glad to consult.

== Ecclesiastical leadership ==
He was very involved with the 1875 Union of the four Presbyterian groups that become the Presbyterian Church in Canada; not all of his contemporaries in the Synod of the Presbyterian Church of the Maritime Provinces of British North America joined with him in this new group, that eventually elected him Moderator of their General Assembly in 1889.

== Principal of Queen's University ==
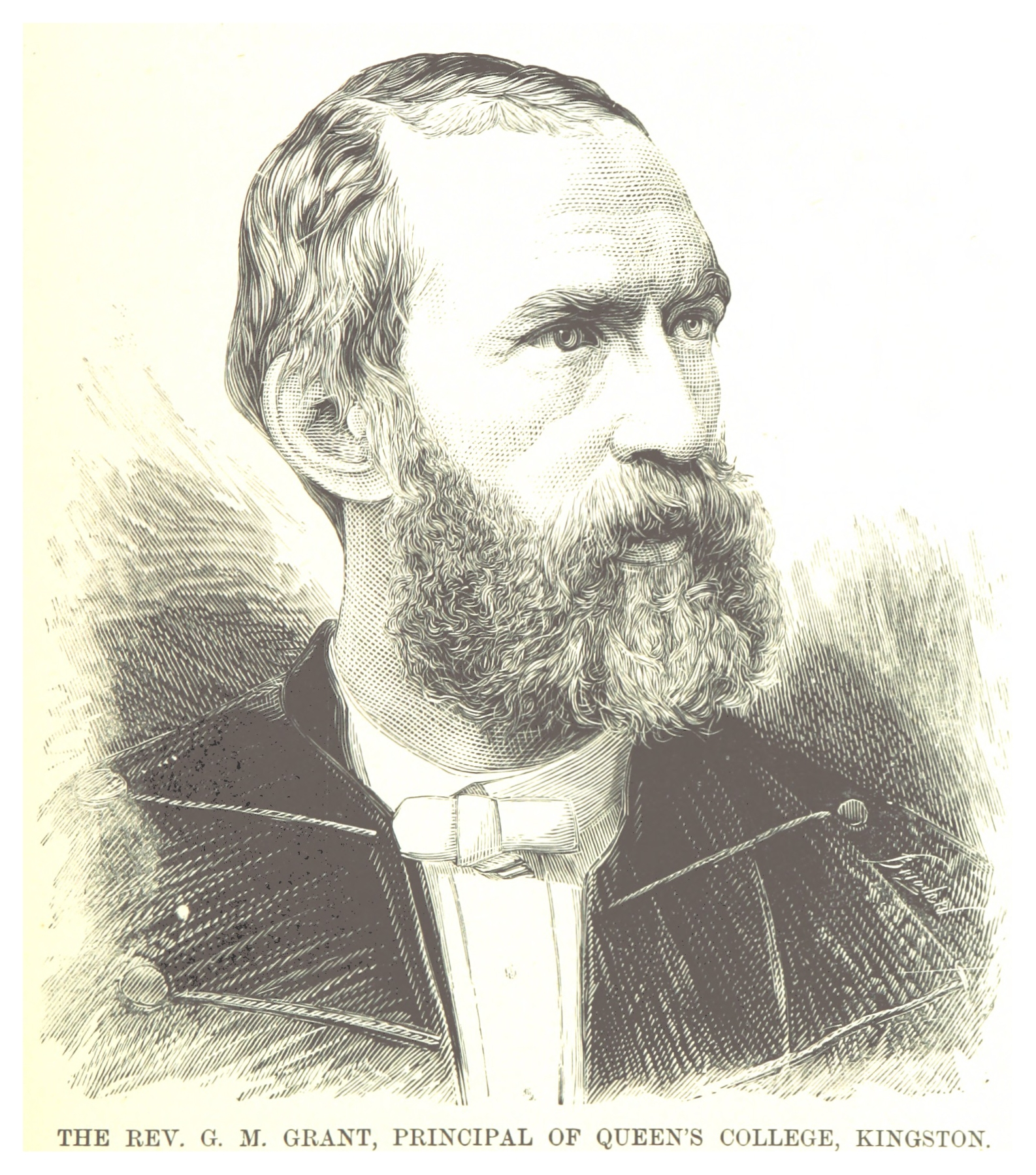

In 1877 Grant was appointed Principal of Queen's College in Kingston, Ontario, by the Third General Assembly of the Presbyterian Church in Canada. Through Grant's efforts and influence, Queen's expanded from a small denominational college into a large and influential educational centre. He attracted to it an exceptionally able body of professors, whose influence in speculation and research was widely felt during the quarter of a century that he remained at its head. Grant's great friend Sir Sandford Fleming served as chancellor of Queen's for most of Grant's tenure. Grant served as president of the Royal Society of Canada from 1890 to 1891.

In 1888 Grant visited Australia, New Zealand and South Africa. The effect of this experience was to strengthen still further the imperialism which was the guiding principle of his political opinions. On the outbreak of the Second Boer War in 1899, Grant was at first disposed to be hostile to the policy of British Prime Minister Lord Salisbury and Joseph Chamberlain; but his eyes were soon opened to the real nature of President Paul Kruger's government, and he enthusiastically welcomed and supported the national feeling which sent men from the outlying portions of the British Empire to assist in defeating the South African Republic and the Orange Free State. Grant did not live to see the conclusion of the war, his death occurring at Kingston, Ontario, on May 10, 1902.

== Legacy ==
Late in 1901, while lying ill in Kingston General Hospital, Grant was visited by the Duke of Cornwall and York, the future King George V, who was touring Canada following the death of Queen Victoria earlier that year. The Prince appointed Grant Companion of the Order of St Michael and St George (CMG) in honour of his achievements. The medal of this British decoration, which went missing for many years, was rediscovered in 2008.

At the time of his death The Times observed "that it is acknowledged on all hands that in him the Dominion has lost one of the ablest men that it has yet produced."

In 1872 Grant married Jessie Lawson, who was the granddaughter of the first president of the Bank of Nova Scotia, William Lawson. Among their descendants was their grandson, the philosopher George Parkin Grant; their great-grandson, Michael Ignatieff, served as leader of the Official Opposition during his term as leader of the Liberal Party of Canada.

Grant Hall, a prominent clock tower and meeting hall at Queen's, is named in his honour.

== Major works ==
- Ocean to Ocean (1873)
- Advantages of Imperial Federation (1889)
- Our National Objects and Aims (1890)
- Religions of the World in Relation to Christianity (1894)

Grant also published several volumes of sermons and lectures.

Academic offices
Preceded by William Snodgrass	Principal of Queen's College at Kingston; 1877–1902	Succeeded by Daniel Miner Gordon
Professional and academic associations
Preceded by Raymond Casgrain	President of the Royal Society of Canada; 1890–1891	Succeeded by Joseph-Clovis-Kemner Laflamme
