= Grant Hall (Queen's University) =

Coordinates: 44.225357°N 76.495°W

- Interactive map of the Grant Hall area

General information
- Type: Academic building
- Architectural style: Neo-Romanesque
- Location: 43 University Avenue; Kingston, Ontario; K7L 3N5
- Completed: 1905
- Cost: $35,000
- Owner: Queen's University

Design and construction
- Architects: Symons and Rae

Grant Hall is a landmark on the campus of Queen's University at Kingston in Kingston, Ontario, Canada. The building was completed in 1905. It is located on University Avenue, just north of Bader Lane. The building is named in honour of Principal George Monro Grant.

It regularly is used as a symbol of the university. Many ceremonial events, plays, and concerts take place in Grant Hall. Classes rarely take place in the hall but due to the large, open space, exams sometimes are scheduled. All university convocation is done in Grant Hall.

== History ==
Grant Hall was built as part of a broader campus expansion plan from 1902 to 1912. Originally, the building was to be funded and named after the Frontenac County Council. The council withdrew financial support for the building in 1901 however, due to the anti-prohibition stance that Principal George Monro Grant had at the time.

As a result, in 1902 the student population fundraised over $35,000 needed to complete the building. The building was finished in 1905 and named posthumously in honour of George Monro Grant and his 25-year anniversary as the university's principal.

The building was designed by Symons and Rae, a Toronto-based architectural firm that also designed other early buildings on campus.

For a time during World War I it was also used as a military hospital.

== Architecture and features ==
The main exterior of the building is cladded in limestone and features design in the Romanesque-style.

A large, iconic feature is the square clock tower with belfry. In the main facade, the windows are made from stained-glass.
