= University District, Kingston =

Neighbourhood in Ontario, Canada

Coordinates: 44°13′51″N 76°29′44″W

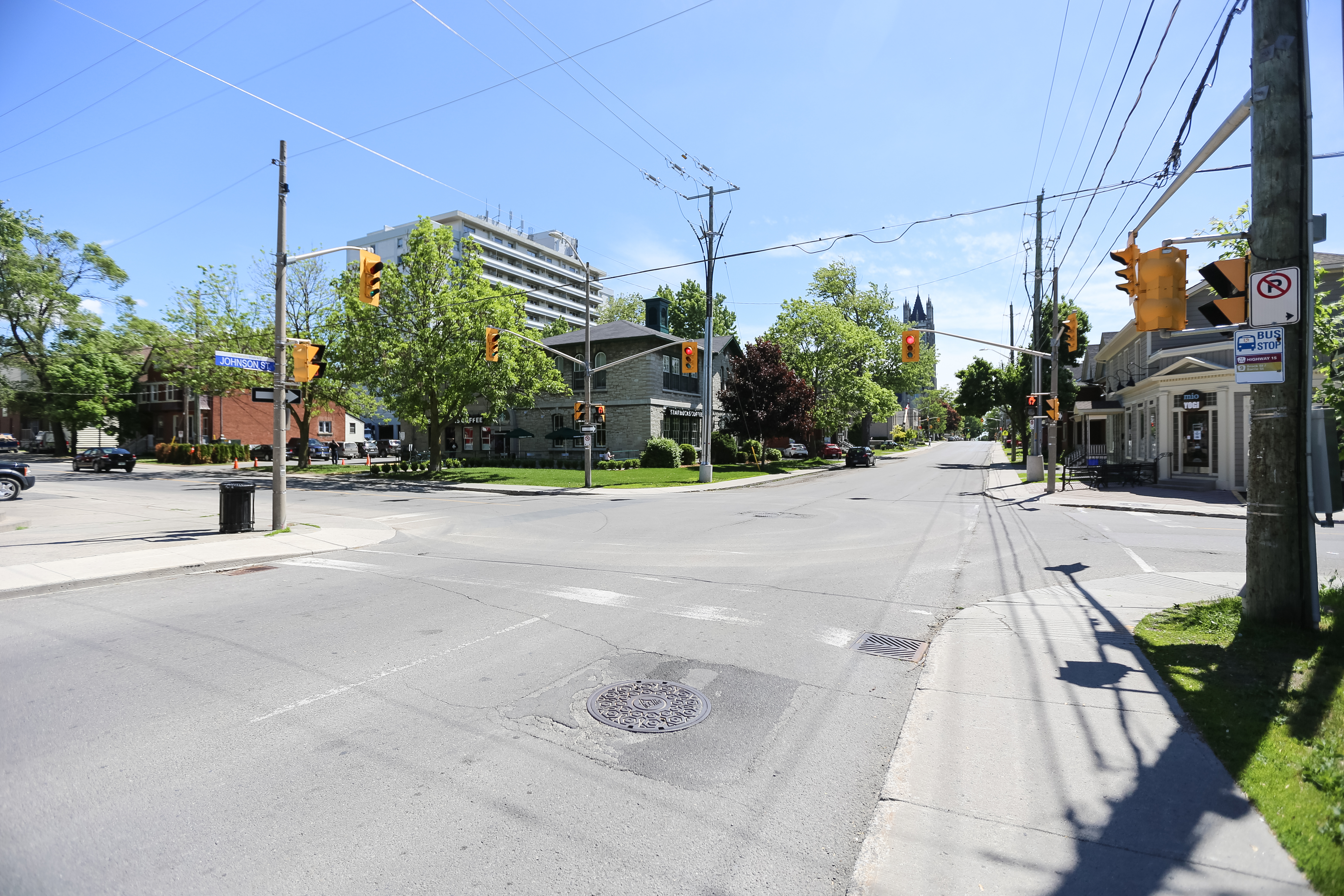
Intersection of Johnson St. & Division St.

The University District is a neighbourhood in Kingston, Ontario, Canada. It encompasses and surrounds Queen's University and is largely inhabited by students and employees of the university. The area is officially bound by Victoria Street to the west, Princess Street to the north, Division & Barrie Street to the east, and King Street to the south.

The University District is characterized as one of the most diverse, walkable and lively neighbourhoods in the City of Kingston. Within its borders, Queen's University offers publicly accessible athletic facilities, art galleries, museums and libraries. The District also contains other institutions such as KCVI, Kingston General Hospital, and many local businesses. The density of rental housing for students in the area coupled with its very close proximity to the university makes its existence a pull factor for prospective students who are considering attending Queen's.

== Name ==
Since the 1980s, the area has been colloquially referred to as the "Student Ghetto", which is still used by some students, alumni, and local residents today. The Alma Mater Society first attempted to rename the area to "Student Village" in 2006. However, the name change did not result in significant uptake, and there were additional complaints by non-student residents of the area who felt excluded. As a second attempt in 2011, the Alma Mater Society passed a resolution through its legislative body, the AMS Assembly, to formally recognize the area as the "University District." Unlike the "Student Village", the 2011 campaign gained widespread acceptance, leading to the City of Kingston formally recognizing the name and implementing distinct street signs officially denoting the area as the University District.

== History ==
The area changed drastically in the early 1970s. Precipitated by a change in age of majority from 21 to 18, students began moving out of boarding houses and into private residences. Previously, parents preferred students to live in boarding houses where they would be taken care of, and signed their leases accordingly. The age of majority changes rendered students as adults who could sign a lease. As a result, many homes in the area were modified to accommodate more students. Many local families couldn't compete with the rent, and were subsequently driven out of the area over the next few decades. As housing standards began to deteriorate in the 1980s, the name "Student Ghetto" began to catch on.

== Neighbourhood improvement programs ==
=== Holiday Housecheck Program ===
Holiday Housecheck is a free student-run service run by the Alma Mater Society that operates during the Winter and Summer breaks. Participants have their mail collected and regular exterior inspections conducted on their homes while they are out of Kingston. Staff ensure doors are closed and locked, windows are closed and intact, snow is stomped down, and examine the premise for signs of break-in. The program typically reaches its capacity of 200 homes each year.

=== Landlord Contract Program ===
This is a voluntary program run by Queen's University dept. of Community Housing for landlords who have had their units inspected by an independent third party for compliance with the City of Kingston's property standards by-law. As of December 1, 2022, Queen's Community Housing has announced that it is winding down the Landlord Contract Program (LCP), and will no longer be accepting new properties.

In return for successfully passing the property standards inspection and complying with several rules regarding limited rent increases and only renting to verified Queen's University students, units in the LCP were extended an exemption under the Residential Tenancies Act, 2006. The exemption permits a Tenancy Termination Agreement (N11)to be signed at the time that the lease is signed.

=== Student Maintenance and Resource Team (SMART) ===
SMART (Student Maintenance & Resource Team) provides property maintenance and community clean-up services to students, landlords, and other members of the Kingston community living in and around the University District. SMART focuses on lawn care and garbage removal for their contracted clients throughout the summer months. As students begin to arrive in the fall, SMART expands its role in ensuring that the University District is clean and safe. They host regular community-wide clean ups, paying particular attention to the busy times of the year, such as Orientation Week, Homecoming, Halloween, and St. Patrick's Day. SMART, and the Alma Mater Society service, is entirely student-run.

=== Housing Resource Centre (HRC) ===
The Housing Resource Centre, also run by the Alma Mater Society, offers support for students who are experiencing a conflict with a landlord or housemate in a safe and confidential space. Trained student volunteers can also answer questions and provide information on property standards, leases, tenant rights, house hunting, home security, and more.

== Street signs ==
The area is characterized by distinguished street signage, which passed Kingston City Council in two phases. Upon the conclusion of the first phase of street sign installations in 2014, it was determined that a review of the University District initiatives was to take place in 2015 and, if deemed successful, installations were to proceed in the second phase area. It was subsequently determined that the first phase of University District rebrand and initiatives satisfied and/or exceeded each success metric that was outlined prior to the first phase of installations. After extensive public consultation, City Council subsequently passed a motion on September 1, 2015, which marked the completion of the initiative.

== Social events ==
Throughout its history, the area has had a reputation of being loud and active, especially on weekend nights and during the annual Homecoming celebrations. Over the years, this created a significant amount of tension between students and non-student residents. Today, strong partnerships exist between City staff, City councillors, the Alma Mater Society, the Kingston Police Force, and Queen's University, which have largely curtailed these issues. Starting in 2017, tensions have increased as students are targeted by laws designed to suppress social activities.

Specifically, the ReUnion Street Festival has been quite successful in ensuring students enjoy homecoming in an enjoyable and responsible matter. The festivale can be described as a collection of programmed events that serve as the capstone for Queen's Homecoming. Its mission is to provide a regulated forum for students and alumni to unitedly celebrate their Queen's pride. The festival takes place on the Saturday night of every homecoming, and offers a solution to the previous lack of programming during this time period. It predominantly takes place on Union Street, between University Avenue and Division Street, with a separate designated and confined area for patrons of legal age to consume alcohol. Since its inception in 2014, the festival has received overwhelmingly positive feedback from alumni and students who attended the event, local police, Queen's University, city staff, and city councillors.

== Housing ==
The majority of the houses are pre World War I era construction. Houses are often owned by private individuals, and are rented to groups of students. In addition, some houses are owned by a co-op, as well as the university itself.

There are a number of larger and smaller housing rental firms operating in the University District, with a focus on student housing. These landlords own and supply a wide range of housing stock, including bedrooms, apartments and full houses, including furnished and unfurnished options. Recent housing developments point to a trend towards higher-end housing with a greater range of amenities and services, rented by the bedroom. Students share common spaces in the unit with roommates who may or may not be pre-selected.

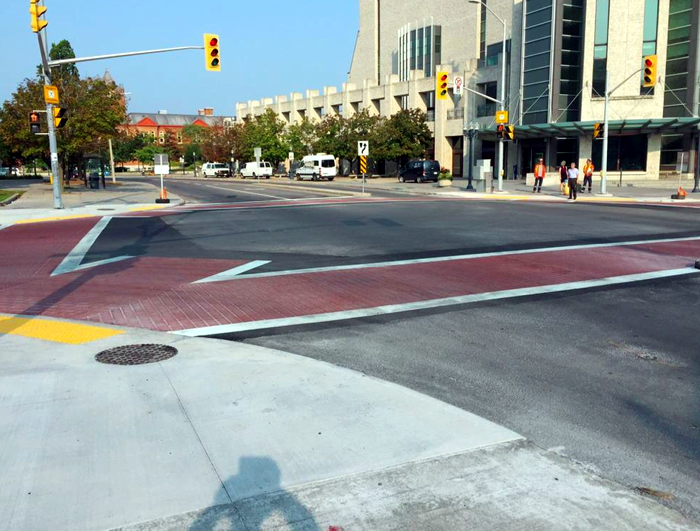
Kingston's first scramble crossing.

== Scramble crossing ==
Kingston's first scramble crossing was installed at Union St. & University Ave. in early September, 2015. Over 1,000 people use this intersection as a pedestrian in any given 15-minute period. The innovative crossing helps keep pedestrian traffic moving at one of the busiest intersections in Kingston.

== Volunteerism ==
Approximately 80% of Queen's students volunteer in the community, providing valuable and unique services that create a natural bond with permanent residents in Kingston.
