= Queen's University at Kingston =

Public university in Ontario, Canada

- Coat of arms
- Latin: Universitas Reginae apud Regiodunum
- Other name: Queen's University
- Former name: Queen's College at Kingston (1841–1912)
- Motto: Sapientia et Doctrina Stabilitas (Latin)
- Motto in English: "Wisdom and knowledge shall be the stability of thy times"
- Type: Public research university
- Established: 16 October 1841 (185 years ago)
- Academic affiliations: ACU, CARL, COU, CUSID, Fields Institute, MNU, Universities Canada, U15
- Endowment: CA$2.17 billion (2026)
- Chancellor: Shelagh Rogers
- Provost: Matthew R. Evans
- Rector: Niki Boytchuk-Hale
- Principal: Patrick Deane
- Faculty: 3,925
- Administrative staff: 2,824 (2022)
- Total staff: 10,262 (2022)
- Students: 33,842 (2022)
- Undergraduates: 26,052
- Postgraduates: 5,733
- Location: Kingston, Ontario, Canada; 44°13′30″N 76°29′42″W
- Campus: Main campus: 40 hectares (99 acres) West campus: 27 hectares (67 acres); Urban
Colours
Blue, Gold, and Red
- Nickname: Golden Gaels
- Sporting affiliations: U Sports – OUA, CUFLA, MAISA
- Mascot: Boo Hoo the Bear
- Fight song: Oil Thigh
- Website: queensu.ca

Queen's University at Kingston, commonly known as Queen's University or simply Queen's, is a public research university in Kingston, Ontario, Canada. Queen's holds more than 1,400 hectares (3,500 acres) of land throughout Ontario and owns Herstmonceux Castle in East Sussex, England. Queen's is organized into eight faculties and schools.

The Church of Scotland established Queen's College in October 1841 via a royal charter from Queen Victoria. The first classes, intended to prepare students for the ministry, were held 7 March 1842, with 15 students and two professors. In 1869, Queen's was the first Canadian university west of the Maritime provinces to admit women. In 1883, a women's college for medical education affiliated with Queen's University was established after male staff and students reacted with hostility to the admission of women to the university's medical classes. In 1912, Queen's ended its affiliation with the Presbyterian Church, and adopted its present name. During the mid-20th century, the university established several faculties and schools and expanded its campus with the construction of new facilities.

Queen's is a co-educational university with more than 33,842 students and over 131,000 alumni living worldwide. Notable alumni include government officials, academics, business leaders and 62 Rhodes Scholars. As of 2022, five Nobel Laureates and one Turing Award winner have been affiliated with the university.

The university funds several magazines and journals, among which are the Queen's Quarterly that has been published since 1893.

== History ==
=== Nineteenth century ===
Queen's was a result of an outgrowth of educational initiatives planned by Presbyterians in the 1830s. A draft plan for the university was presented at a synod meeting in Kingston in 1839, with a modified bill introduced through the 13th Parliament of Upper Canada during a session in 1840. On 16 October 1841, a royal charter was issued through Queen Victoria establishing Queen's College at Kingston. Queen's resulted from years of effort by Presbyterians of Upper Canada to found a college for the education of ministers in the growing colony and to instruct youth in various branches of science and literature. They modelled the university after the University of Edinburgh and the University of Glasgow. Classes began on 7 March 1842, in a small woodframe house on the edge of the city with two professors and 15 students.

The college moved several times during its first eleven years, before settling in its present location. Prior to Canadian Confederation, the Presbyterian Church in Scotland, the Canadian government, and private citizens financially supported the college. In 1869, Queen's was the first Canadian university west of the Maritime provinces to admit women.

After Confederation, the college faced ruin when the federal government withdrew its funding and the Commercial Bank of the Midland District collapsed, a disaster which cost Queen's two-thirds of its endowment. The college was rescued after Principal William Snodgrass and other officials created a fundraising campaign across Canada.

The risk of financial ruin worried the administration until the century's final decade. They considered leaving Kingston and merging with the University of Toronto as late as the 1880s. With the additional funds bequeathed from Queen's first major benefactor, Robert Sutherland, the college staved off financial failure and maintained its independence. Queen's was given university status on 17 May 1881.

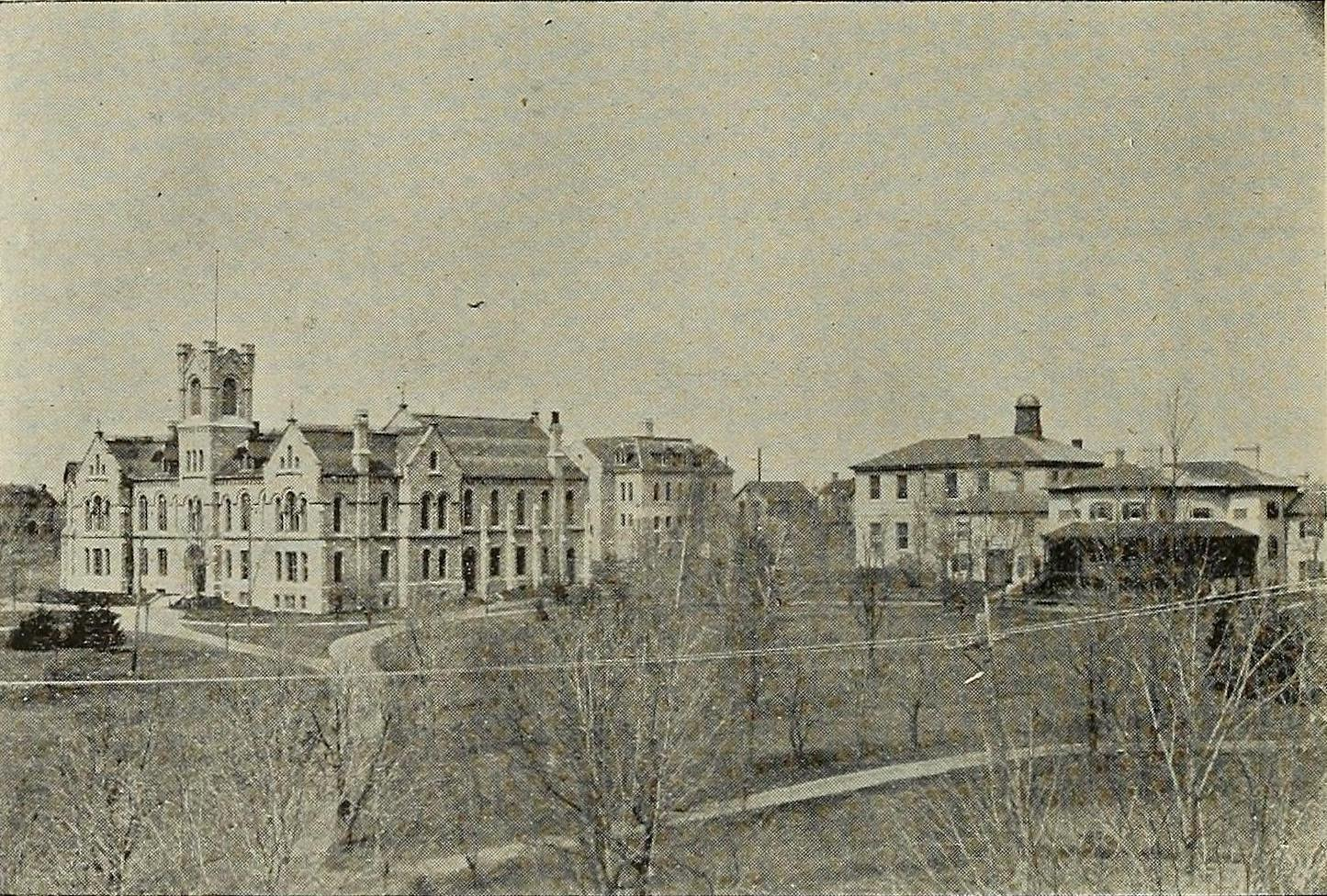
The university's campus in 1899

In 1880, three women were admitted to the university's medical degree courses; however, their presence was met with such hostility by male students and staff that the university decided to expel the women in 1883. A Women's Medical College was founded to enable the three students to complete their studies. Theological Hall, completed in 1880, originally served as Queen's main building throughout the late 19th century.

=== Twentieth century ===
In 1912, Queen's separated from the Presbyterian Church of Scotland and changed its name to Queen's University at Kingston. Queen's Theological College remained in the control of the Presbyterian Church in Canada, until 1925, when it joined the United Church of Canada. The theological college merged with the Queen's department of religious studies, and the program closed in 2015.

The university faced another financial crisis during World War I from a sharp drop in enrolment due to the military enlistment of students, staff, and faculty. A $1,000,000 fundraising drive and the armistice in 1918 saved the university. Approximately 1,500 students fought in the war and 187 died.

On 18 August 1938, a year prior to the start of World War II, US President Franklin D. Roosevelt came to Queen's to accept an honorary degree. In a broadcast heard around the world, the president voiced the American policy of mutual alliance and friendship with Canada. During World War II, 2,917 graduates from Queen's served in the armed forces, suffering 164 fatalities. The Memorial Room in Memorial Hall of the John Deutsch University Centre lists Queen's students who died during the world wars.

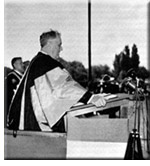
US President Franklin D. Roosevelt speaking at Queen's after receiving his honorary degree

Queen's grew quickly after the war, propelled by the expanding postwar economy and the demographic boom that peaked in the 1960s. From 1951 to 1961, enrolment increased from just over 2,000 students to more than 3,000. The university embarked on a building program, constructing five student residences in less than ten years.

After the reorganization of legal education in Ontario in the mid-1950s, Queen's Faculty of Law opened in 1957 in the new John A. Macdonald Hall. Other construction projects at Queen's in the 1950s included the construction of Richardson Hall to house Queen's administrative offices and Dunning Hall. By the end of the 1960s, like many other Canadian universities, Queen's tripled its enrolment and greatly expanded its faculty, staff, and facilities, as a result of the baby boom and generous support from the public sector. By the mid-1970s, the university had 10,000 full-time students. Among the new facilities were four more high capacity residences: An Clachan, Elrond College (currently Princess Towers), a cooperative residence that the university no longer owns, John Orr Tower situated on the west campus, and Jean Royce Hall. In addition to this new facilities consisted of separate buildings for the Departments of Mathematics, Physics, Biology and Psychology, Social Sciences and the Humanities.

During this period, Queen's created the Schools of Music, Public Administration (now part of Policy Studies), Rehabilitation Therapy, and Urban and Regional Planning. The establishment of the Faculty of Education in 1968 on land about a kilometre west of the university inaugurated the university's west campus. Queen's was an early pioneer of computer assisted legal research; it was the home of the QUIC/LAW Canadian legal research project from 1968 to 1973, when the project was spun off and commercialized. QUIC/LAW's software was licensed to West Publishing in 1976 as the foundation for the Westlaw database, and then the entire Canadian law database, by then known as Quicklaw, was sold to West's archrival LexisNexis in 2002. The first female chancellor of Queen's University, Agnes Richardson Benidickson, was installed on 23 October 1980.

Queen's celebrated its sesquicentennial anniversary in 1991, and Charles, Prince of Wales, and his then wife, Diana, visited the campus to mark the occasion. The Prince of Wales presented a replica of the 1841 Royal Charter granted by Queen Victoria, which had established the university; the replica is displayed in the John Deutsch University Centre. In 1993, Queen's received Herstmonceux Castle as a donation from alumnus Alfred Bader. The university uses the castle to house the Bader College.

=== Twenty-first century ===
In 2001, the Senate Educational Equity Committee (SEEC) studied the experiences of visible minority and Aboriginal faculty members at Queen's after a black female professor left, alleging she had experienced racism. Following this survey the SEEC commissioned a study which found many perceived a 'culture of Whiteness' at the university. The report concluded "white privilege and power continues to be reflected in the Eurocentric curricula, traditional pedagogical approaches, hiring, promotion and tenure practices, and opportunities for research" at Queen's. The university's response to the report is the subject of continuing debate. The administration implemented measures to promote diversity beginning in 2006, such as the position of diversity advisor and the hiring of "dialogue monitors" to facilitate discussions on social justice.

In May 2010, Queen's University joined the Matariki Network of Universities, an international group of universities created in 2010, which focuses on strong links between research and undergraduate teaching.

In response to the COVID-19 pandemic in Ontario, the university received $440,000 from the Government of Canada to increase uptake of COVID-19 vaccines among health care providers, community organizations and vulnerable individuals who are vaccine hesitant.

In July 2021, former senator Murray Sinclair began his term as the 15th chancellor of Queen's. He was succeeded by broadcast journalist Shelagh Rogers in July 2024.

In 2023, the university disclosed a projected deficit of $48 million for the 2024 year. Stringent measures were unveiled by Provost Matthew Evans in response to the deficit, which included a cap on class size and a hiring freeze. The measures caused a backlash among faculty and students, with the latter organizing protests. Evans faced significant criticism for his handling of the crisis, which was widely covered in both local and national publications in Canada.

== Campus ==
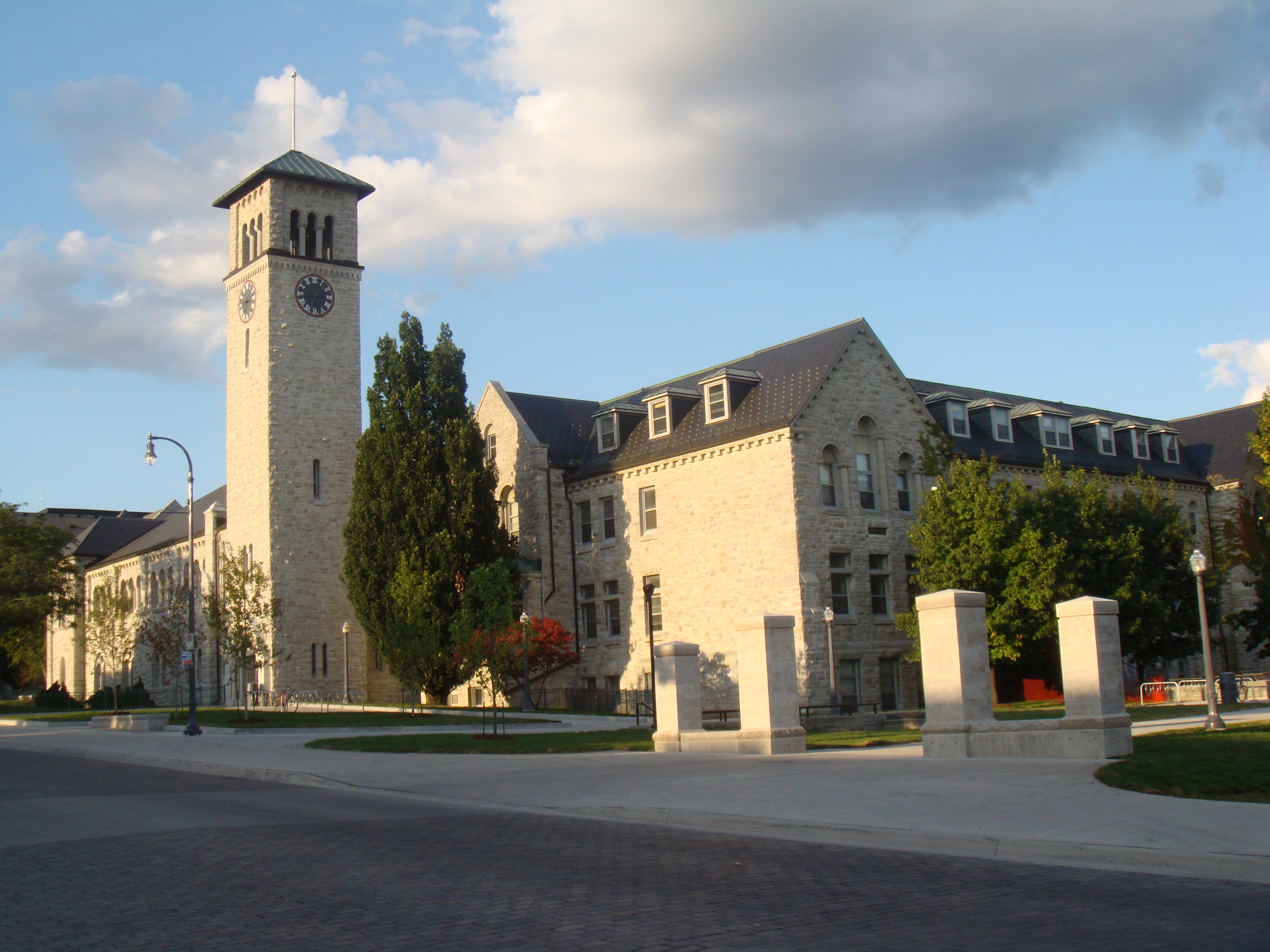
Grant Hall has been considered the university's most recognized landmark since its completion in 1905

The university grounds lies within the neighbourhood of Queen's in the city of Kingston, Ontario. The university's main campus is bordered to the south by Lake Ontario and Kingston General Hospital, city parks to the east, and by residential neighbourhoods, known as the University District, Kingston, in all other directions. The campus grew to its present size of 40 ha (99 acres) through gradual acquisitions of adjacent private lands and remains the university's largest landholding. In addition to its main campus in Kingston, Queen's owns several other properties around Kingston, as well as in Central Frontenac Township, Ontario; Rideau Lakes, Ontario; and East Sussex, England. Queen's University is situated on traditional Anishinaabe and Haudenosaunee territory.

The buildings at Queen's vary in age from Summerhill, which opened in 1839, to Mitchell Hall, which opened in 2018. Grant Hall, completed in 1905, is considered the university's most recognizable landmark. It is named after Reverend George Munro Grant, who served as Queen's seventh principal. The building is used to host concerts, lectures, meetings, exams, and convocations. Two buildings owned and managed by the university have been listed as National Historic Sites of Canada. The Kingston General Hospital is the oldest operating public hospital in Canada. The Roselawn House, which is east of the west campus, is the core component of the university's Donald Gordon Centre.

=== Libraries, museums, and galleries ===
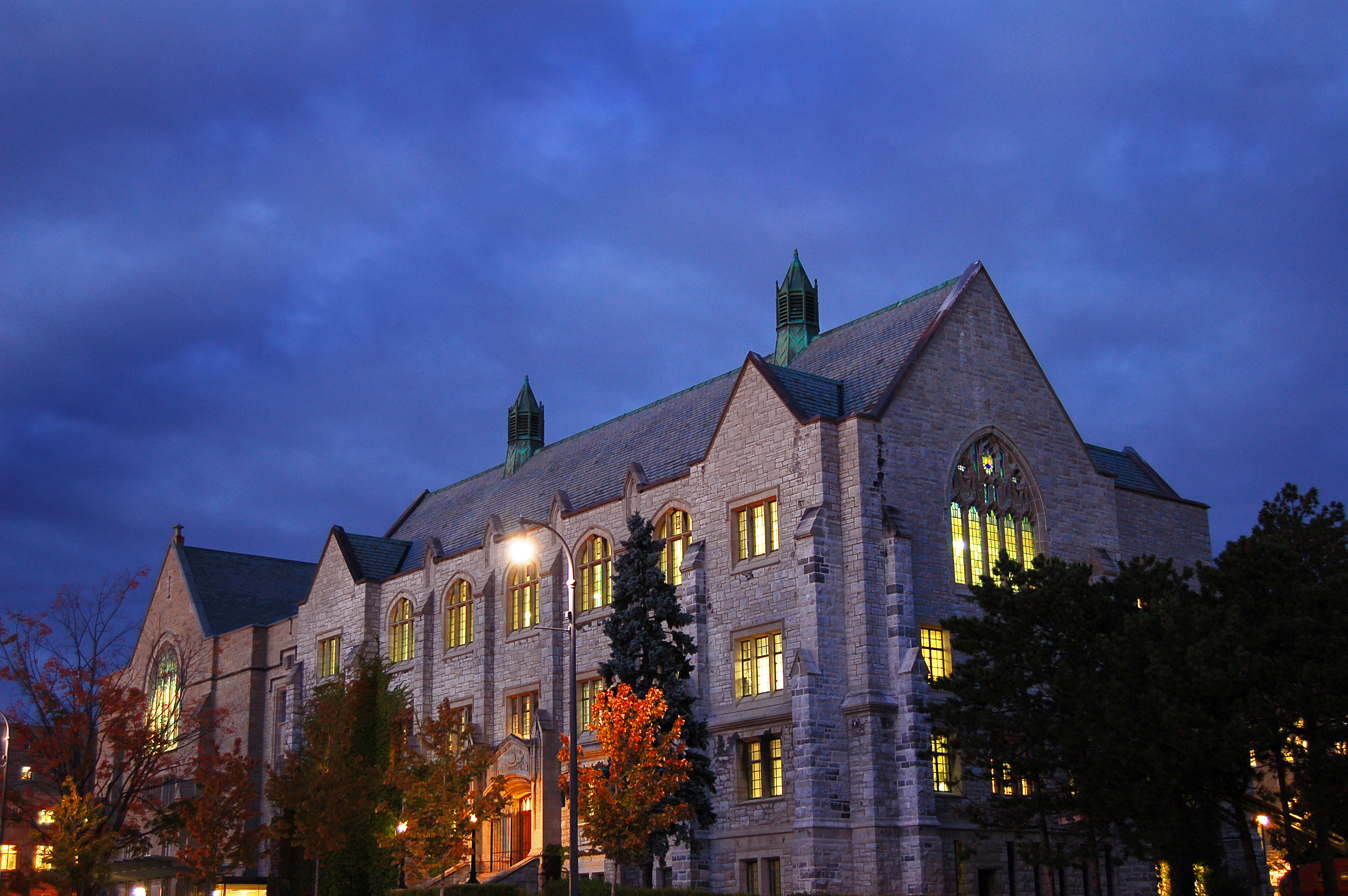
The Engineering & Science Library and the W.D. Jordan Rare Books and Special Collections are both housed at Douglas Library

Queen's University Libraries include six campus libraries and archives in six facilities housing 2.2 million physical items and 400,000 electronic resources, including e-books, serial titles and databases. The library's budget in 2007–2008 was $18.1 million, with $9.8 million dedicated to acquisitions. The libraries are Bracken Health Sciences Library, Education Library, Lederman Law Library, Stauffer Humanities and Social Sciences Library, and Engineering & Science Library. The W.D. Jordan Rare Books and Special Collections Library notably harbors early dated books from 1475 to 1700. The Engineering & Science Library and the W.D. Jordan Rare Books and Special Collections Library share facilities, known as Douglas Library. Since 1981, the Queen's University archives has been housed in Kathleen Ryan Hall. The archive manages, preserves, conserves, and makes accessible the information assets and historical record of the university. In addition to the university's archive, Kathleen Ryan Hall also houses the City of Kingston's archives.

Queen's operates the Miller Museum of Geology, an earth-science teaching museum which features an Earth Science and Geological Collections of 10,000 minerals and 865 fossils, as well as an exhibit of the geology of the Kingston area. The museum is largely used as an earth-science teaching museum for local schools and natural-science interest groups in eastern Ontario. The permanent exhibits feature dinosaurs, dinosaur eggs, fossils of early multi-celled animals, and land tracks fossilized from 500 million years ago.

Queen's art collections are housed at the Agnes Etherington Art Centre. The art centre owes its namesake to Agnes Etherington, whose house was donated to the university and is used as an art museum, attached to the main art centre. Opened in 1957, it contains over 14,000 works of art, including works by Rembrandt and Inuit art. The university's student body and faculty run the Union Gallery, an art gallery opened in 1994. The gallery is dedicated to the promotion of student and contemporary art.

=== Housing and student facilities ===
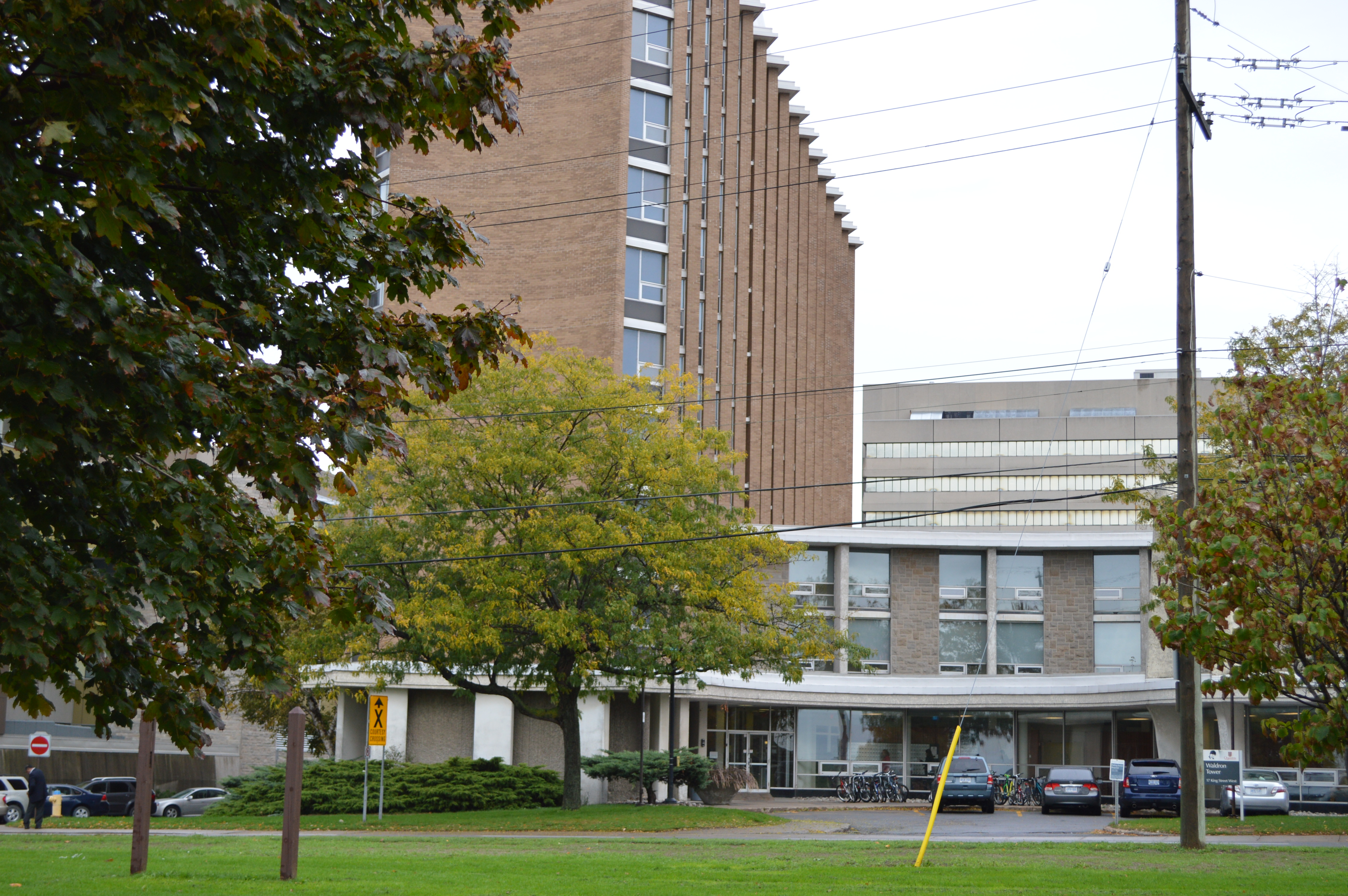
Waldron Tower is one of 18 student residences maintained by the university

The university has 18 student residences: Adelaide Hall, Ban Righ Hall, Brant House, Chown Hall, Gordon House, Brockington House, Graduate Residence, Harkness Hall, John Orr Tower Apartments, Leggett Hall, Leonard Hall, McNeill House, Morris Hall, Smith House, Victoria Hall, Waldron Tower, Watts Hall, and Jean Royce Hall. The largest is Victoria Hall, built in 1965, which houses nearly 900 students. In September 2010, 83.3% of first-year students lived on campus, part of the 26% of the overall undergraduate population who lived on campus.

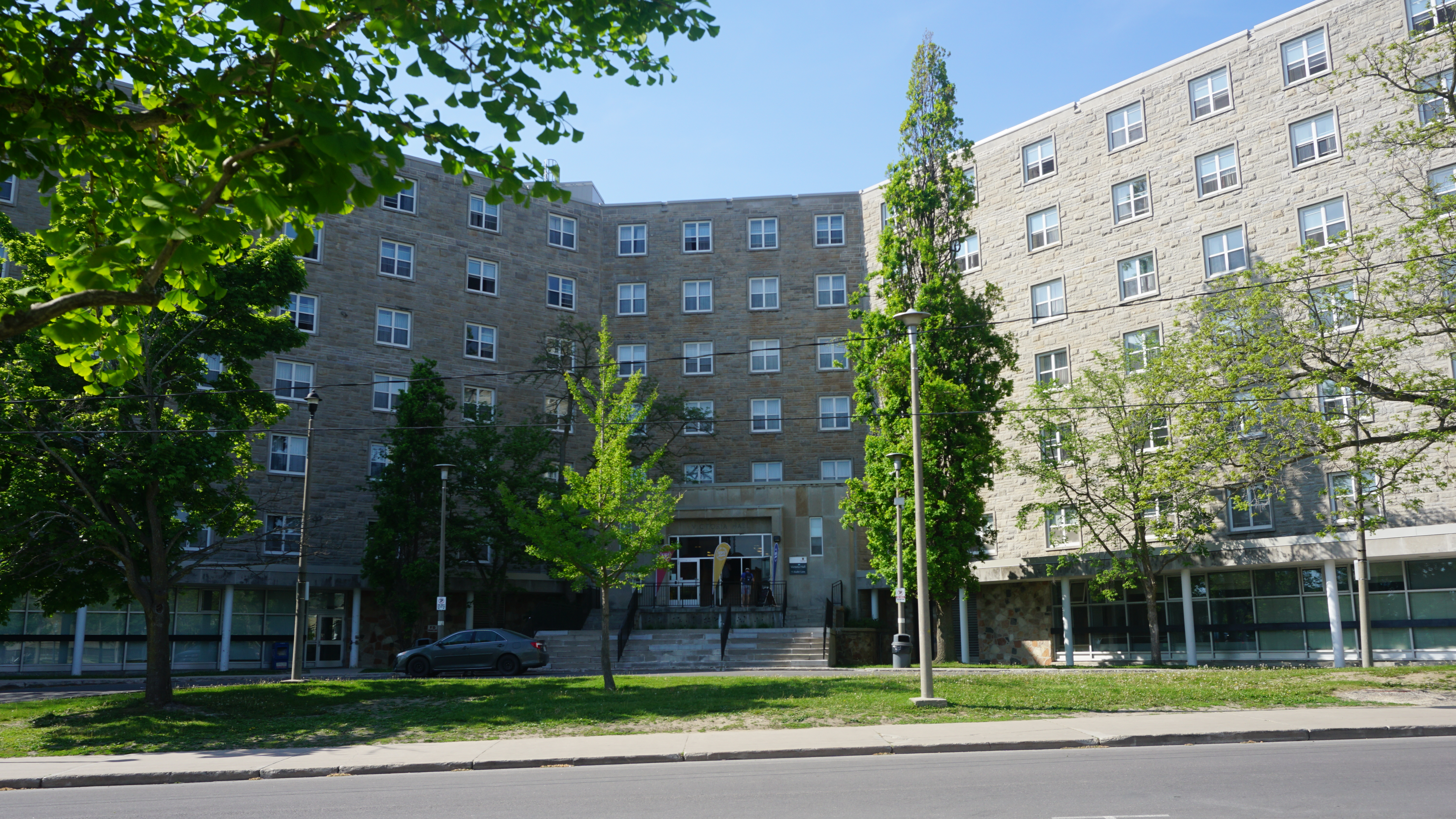
Victoria Hall is the largest student residence at the university

Residents were represented by two groups, the Main Campus Residents' Council, which represents the main campus, and the Jean Royce Hall Council, which represents the west campus (Jean Royce Hall, Harkness International Hall, and the Graduate Residence). They were responsible for representing resident concerns, providing entertainment services, organizing events, and upholding Residence Community Standards. In 2013, the Main Campus and Jean Royce Hall Residents' Councils were amalgamated into one organization, called ResSoc, standing for Residence Society. ResSoc employs 7 Executives, 17 House Presidents, and 27 Residence Facilitators. ResSoc also has over 100 volunteer positions such as floor representatives and executive interns. In 2013, The Residence Society introduced the StAR (Student Appreciation in Residence) Positive Recognition program. The program encourages positive behaviour in residence and recognizes individuals who help others in need. Recipients are given a certificate as well as remuneration for their contributions.

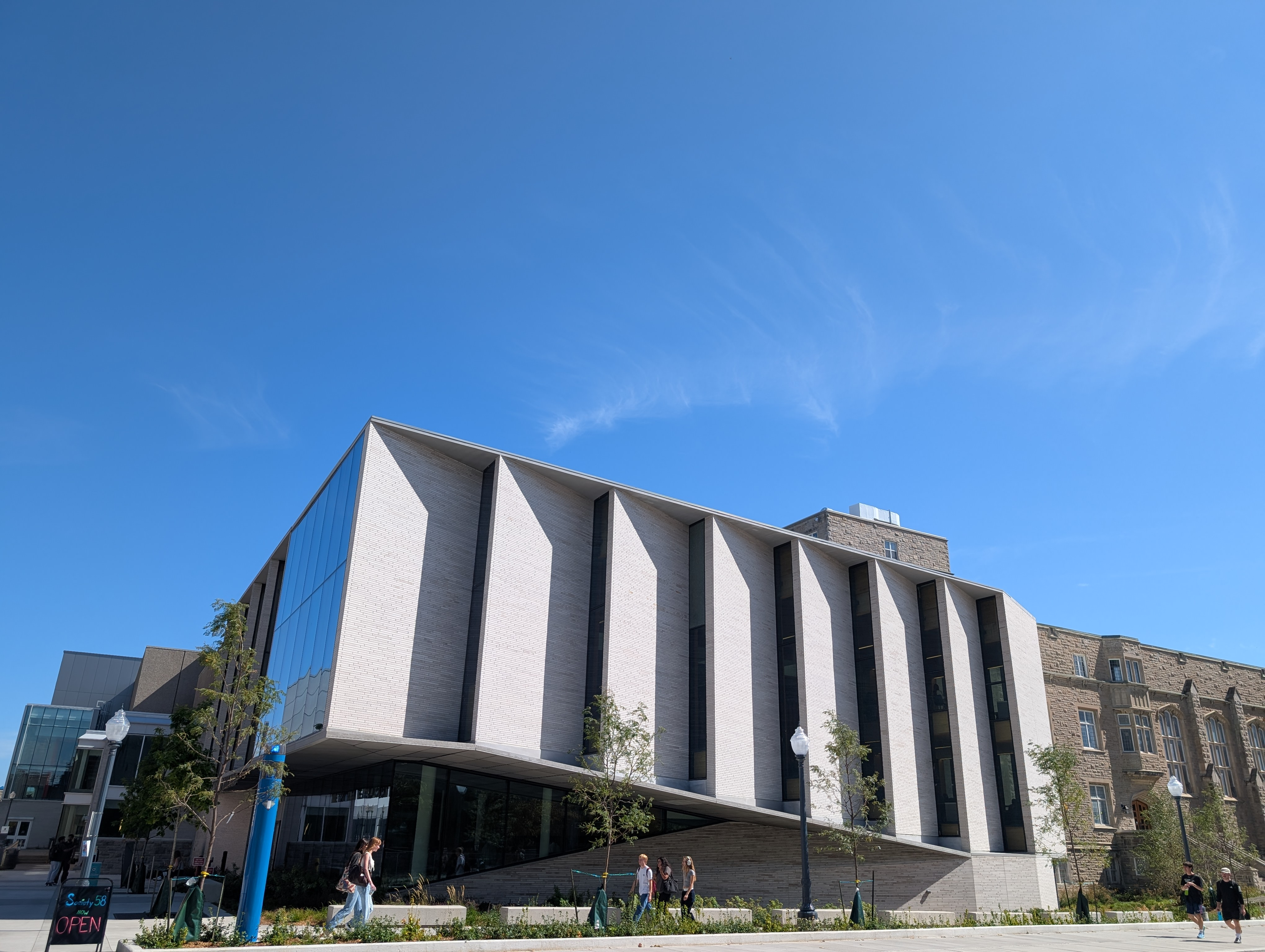
The renovated John Deutsch University Centre, which is part of the Student Life Centre

The Student Life Centre is the centre of student governance and student-directed social, cultural, entertainment, and recreational activities. It consists of the John Deutsch University Centre (JDUC), Grey House, Carruthers Hall, Queen's Journal House, MacGillivray-Brown Hall, and the non-athletic sections of Queen's Centre. Collectively, these buildings provide 10,500 square metres (113,000 sq ft) of space to the Queen's community. The JDUC contains the offices of a number of student organizations, including the Alma Mater Society of Queen's University (AMS) and the Society of Graduate and Professional Students (SGPS), as well as retail and food services. The university has 21 food outlets throughout the campus, as well as three major residence dining facilities.

=== Off-campus facilities ===
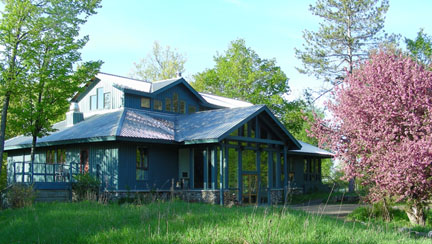
The Queen's University Biological Station is Canada's largest inland field station, and is situated at Opinicon Lake, northwest of Kingston

Queen's has off-campus facilities in the Kingston area and abroad. The university has a second campus in Kingston, known as the west campus. Acquired in 1969, the west campus is 2 km (1.2 mi) west of the main campus, and covers 27 ha (67 acres) of land. It has two student residences, the Faculty of Education, the Coastal Engineering Lab, and several athletic facilities, including the Richardson Memorial Stadium. In May 2007, the university approved the designs for the Isabel Bader Centre for Performing Arts, also in Kingston. The centre, home of the Department of Film and Media, opened in September 2014.

The university owns a research facility in Rideau Lakes, Ontario, known as the Queen's University Biological Station. Opened during the 1950s, the field station encompasses approximately 3,000 ha (7,400 acres) of property, a range of habitat types typical of Eastern Ontario, and many species of conservation concern in Canada.

Queen's has an agreement with Novelis Inc. to acquire a 20-hectare (49-acre) property next to the company's research and development centre in Kingston. The agreement is part of the plan to establish Innovation Park at Queen's University, an innovative technology park at the corner of Princess and Concession Streets. The property was acquired for $5.3 million, a portion of the $21 million grant Queen's received from the Ontario government in 2007 to pioneer this innovative new regional R&D "co-location" model. Queen's leases approximately 7,900 square metres (85,000 sq ft) of the Novelis R&D facilities to accommodate faculty-led research projects that have industrial partners and small and medium-size companies with a research focus and a desire to interact with Queen's researchers. The remainder of the government funds support further development of the technology park to transform the property into a welcoming and dynamic site for business expansion and relocation.

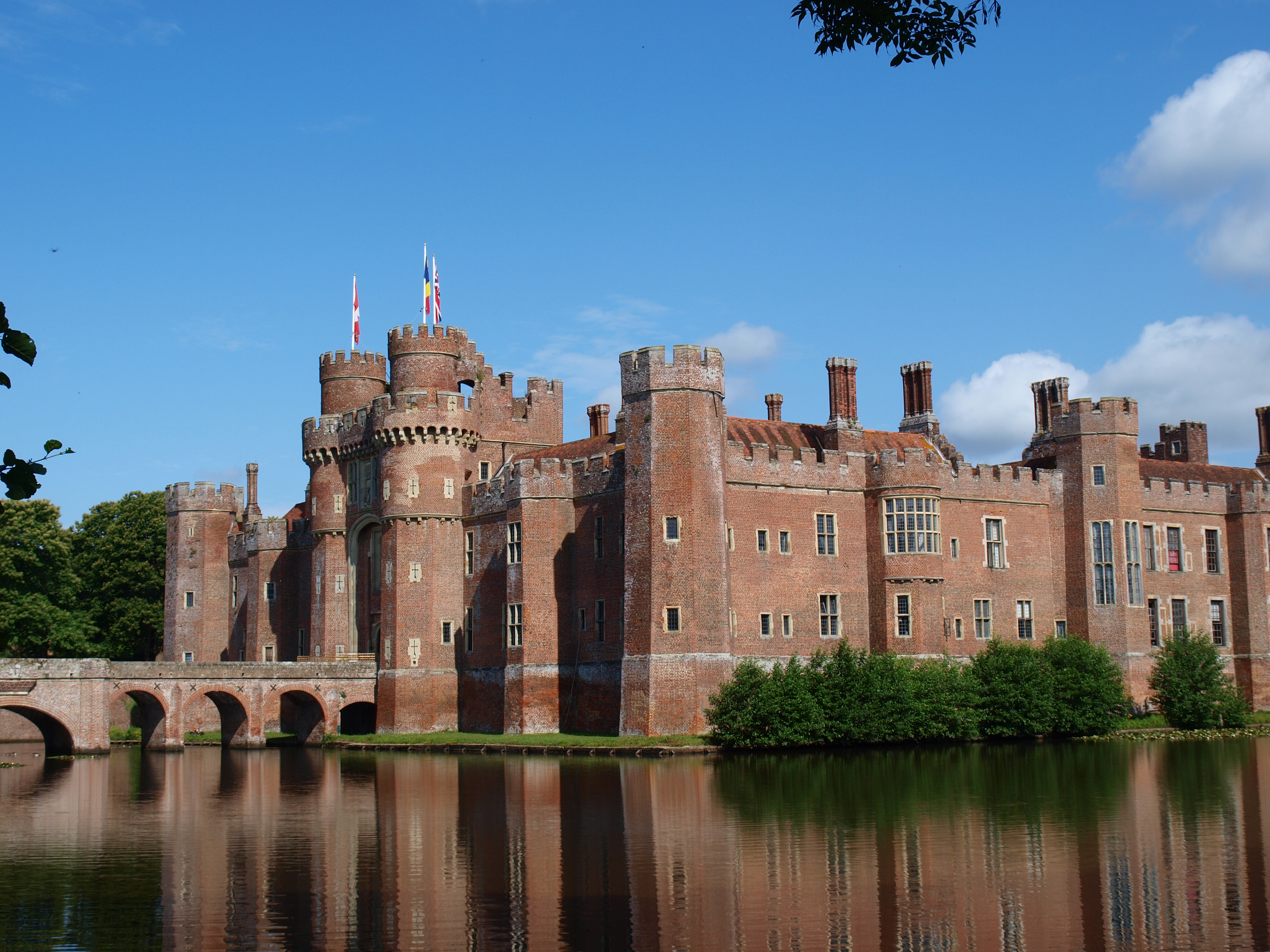
Herstmonceux Castle, which houses Bader College

Bader College is housed in Herstmonceux Castle, East Sussex, England, which was donated to Queen's in 1993 by alumnus Alfred Bader. Bader College is academically fully integrated with Queen's, although financially self-sufficient. Its mission is to provide academic programs for undergraduate students whose academic interests are oriented toward the United Kingdom, Europe, and the European Union; continuing-education programs for executives and other professional or "special interest" groups; a venue for conferences and meetings; a base for international graduate students and other scholars undertaking research in the United Kingdom and Europe; and an enhanced educational, social, and cultural environment for the local community, using the unique heritage of the castle. The opportunity to study at Bader College is not limited to Queen's students. Queen's has academic exchange agreements with Canadian and foreign universities.

=== Sustainability ===
Queen's Sustainability Office, created in 2008, is charged with the university's green initiatives and creating awareness about environmental issues. The office is headed by a sustainability manager, who works with the university, external community groups, and the government. In 2009, with the signing of the Ontario Universities Committed to a Greener World agreement, Queen's pledged to transform its campus into a model of environmental responsibility. Queen's was the second Ontario university to sign the University and College Presidents' Climate Change Statement of Action for Canada in 2010.

The university campus received a B grade from the Sustainable Endowments Institute on its College Sustainability Report Card for 2011.

== Administration ==
The governance of the university is conducted through the Board of Trustees, the Senate, and the University Council, the first two of which of were established under the Royal Charter of 1841. The Board is responsible for the university's conduct and management and its property, revenues, business, and affairs. Ex-officio governors of the Board include the university's Chancellor, Principal, and Rector. The Board has 34 other trustees, 33 of whom are elected by the various members of the university community, including elected representatives from the student body. The representative from Queen's Theological College is now the only appointed trustee.

The Senate is responsible for determining all academic matters affecting the university as a whole, including student discipline. It consists of 17 ex-officio positions granted to the principal and Vice-Chancellor, the Vice-Principals of the university, the senior dean of each faculty, dean of student affairs, the deputy provost, and the presidents of the undergraduate, graduate, and faculty associations. The Senate also consists of 55 other members, appointed or elected by various communities of the university, including elected representatives of the student body.

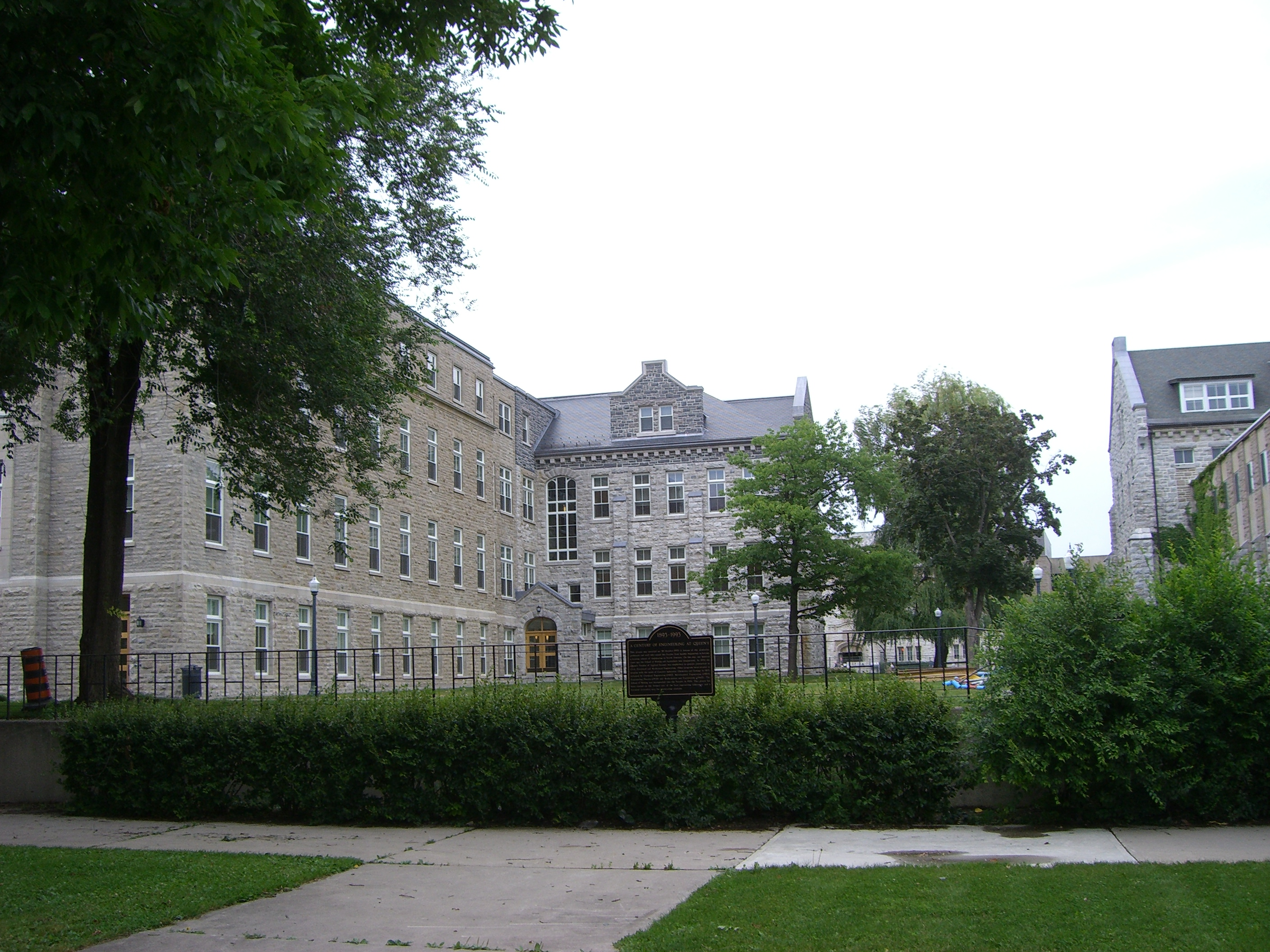
Gordon Hall houses many of Queen's administrative offices

The Royal Charter of 1841 was amended to include the University Council in 1874. The council is a composite of the Board of Trustees, senators, and an equal number of elected graduates. It serves as both an advisory and an ambassadorial body to the university as a whole and is responsible for the election of the Chancellor. Although it is not directly involved in operations, the Council may bring to the Senate or Board of Trustees any matter it believes affects Queen's well-being. The Council meets once per year, typically in May.

The Chancellor is the highest officer and the ceremonial head of the university. The office was created in 1874 and first filled in 1877, although it was only enshrined in law in 1882 after its amendment into the Royal Charter of 1841. The responsibilities of the Chancellor include presiding over convocations, conferring degrees, and chairing the annual meetings of the council, and is an ex-officio officer and a voting member of the board of trustees. A person is elected to the office of Chancellor on a three-year term by the Council unless there is more than one candidate, in which case an election is conducted among Queen's graduates.

The Principal, who normally is also the Vice-Chancellor, acts as the chief executive officer of the university under the authority of the Board and the Senate, and supervises and directs the academic and administrative work of the university and of its teaching and non-teaching staff. Since 1974, principals have been appointed for five-year terms, renewable subject to review. The formal authority for the appointment of the Principal rests under the Royal Charter with the Board of Trustees, although recent principals have been selected by a joint committee of trustees and senators. The office of the Vice-Chancellor has typically been held by the incumbent principal. In 1961, an amendment was secured by the Board to separate the office of Principal from that of Vice-Chancellor if it wished. The first and only person to hold the office of Vice-Chancellor but not the office of Principal was William Archibald Mackintosh. The current principal is Patrick Deane, serving as the twenty-first principal since 1 July 2019.

The Rector is the third officer of the university, and serves as the highest-ranking representative of the student body. Though the first Rector took office in 1913, this role has been exclusively held by students since 1969, when the student body forced the resignation of then-Rector Senator Gratton O'Leary. Unlike the executives of the various student governments, the Rector represents all students – both undergraduate and graduate – and is elected to a three-year term, though it has become traditional for student Rectors to step down after only two years. Despite standing separately from any student government, the Rector works closely with the AMS and SGPS to represent the interests of their constituent students. This allows the Rector to, both formally and informally, act as an intermediary between students and the university administration on a range of topical, sensitive, or controversial issues. The Rector serves as one of three student representatives on the Board of Trustees (the other two being the Undergraduate and Graduate Student Trustees) and is a recognized observer at the Senate. Additionally, the Rector is often called upon to represent student interests on various committees of the Board and Senate. Finally, the Rector plays a ceremonial role at events such as convocation.

=== Finances ===
The university completed the 2011–12-year with revenues of $947.7 million and expenses of $872.8 million, with an excess of revenues over expenses at $74.9 million. Government grants and student fees are the two largest sources of income for the university. As of 31 July 2026, Queen's University had an endowment valued at approximately C$2.17 billion.

In 2023, Queen's disclosed a projected deficit of $62.8 million for 2024, which was later reduced to $48 million. Blaming the deficit on a tuition freeze introduced in Ontario in 2019, the university announced drastic measures, which included a hiring freeze and caps on class sizes.

The university has been registered as an educational charitable organization by Canada Revenue Agency since 1 January 1967. As of 2011, the university registered primarily as a post-secondary institution, with 70% of the charity dedicated to management and maintenance. The charity has 21% dedicated to research, with the remaining 8% dedicated to awards, bursaries, and scholarships. Proceeds from the charity also go toward Queen's Theological College (as an affiliated college) and Bader College at Herstmonceaux Castle.

== Academics ==
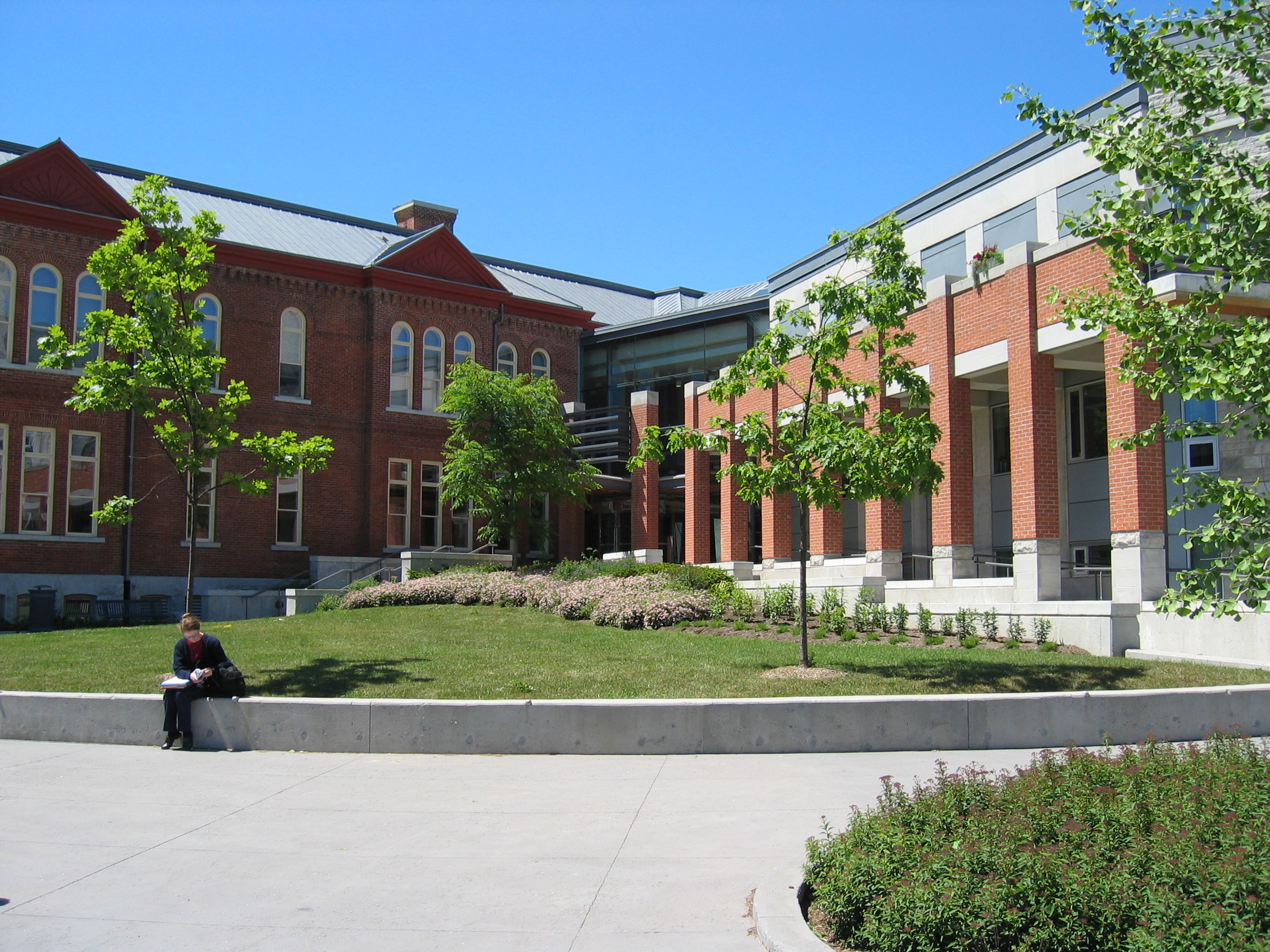
Exterior of Goodes Hall, a building that houses the Smith School of Business

Queen's is a publicly funded research university and a member of the Association of Universities and Colleges of Canada. Full-time undergraduate programs comprise the majority of the school's enrolment, made up of 16,339 full-time undergraduate students. In 2009, the two largest programs by enrolment were the social sciences, with 3,286 full-time and part-time students, followed by engineering, with 3,097 full-time and part-time students. The university conferred 3,232 bachelor's degrees, 153 doctoral degrees, 1,142 master's degrees, and 721 first professional degrees in 2008–9.

Queen's is organized into several faculties and schools. These include Arts and Science, Education, Engineering and Applied Science, Health Sciences, Law, and Smith School of Business. Many of these faculties and schools are further organized into smaller departments, divisions, and schools.

The university operates several study abroad programs, including the "First Year Program" at Bader College, and study abroad semester programs offered by the university's international programs office. Additionally, students can apply for international student exchange, with Queen's having exchange agreements with over 85 universities outside Canada.

=== Rankings and reputation ===
University rankings

World rankings
- ARWU World: 201–300
- QS World: =179
- THE World: 301–350
- USNWR World: 415

Canadian rankings
- QS National: 9
- THE National: 11
- USNWR National: 12
- Maclean's Medical/Doctoral: =7
- Maclean's Reputation: 6

Queen's University has placed in post-secondary school rankings. In the 2022 Academic Ranking of World Universities rankings, the university ranked 201–300 in the world and 9–12 in Canada. The 2027 QS World University Rankings ranked the university 179th in the world and ninth in Canada. The 2024 Times Higher Education World University Rankings placed the university 251–300 in the world, and 12th in Canada. In U.S. News & World Report 2022–23 global university rankings, Queen's placed 359th, and 12th in Canada. The Canadian-based news magazine Maclean's ranked the university eighth in its 2022 Medical-Doctoral Canadian university rankings.

Queen's also placed in several rankings that evaluated the employment prospects of graduates. In a 2011 survey conducted by Mines ParisTech's, they found Queen's placed 38th in the world and first in Canada for number of graduates employed as the chief executive officer (or equivalent) of Fortune 500 companies. In an employability survey published by The New York Times in October 2011, when CEOs and chairpersons were asked to select the top universities which they recruited from, the university placed 74th in the world and fifth in Canada.

=== Research ===
Queen's University is a member of the U15, a group that includes 15 Canadian research universities. In 2018, Queen's placed eleventh in Research Infosource ranking of Canadian research universities, with a sponsored research income (external sources of funding) of $207,034 million in 2017. In the same year, Queen's faculty averaged a sponsored research income of $266,100, while graduate students averaged a sponsored research income of $44,300. The federal government is the largest funding source, providing 49.8% of Queen's research budget, primarily through grants. Corporations contribute another 26.3% of the research budget.

Queen's research performance has been noted by several bibliometric university rankings, which uses citation analysis to evaluates the impact a university has on academic publications. In 2019, the Performance Ranking of Scientific Papers for World Universities ranked Queen's 344thin the world and 14th in Canada. In University Ranking by Academic Performance's 2018–19 rankings, the university ranked 353rd in the world and 14th in Canada.

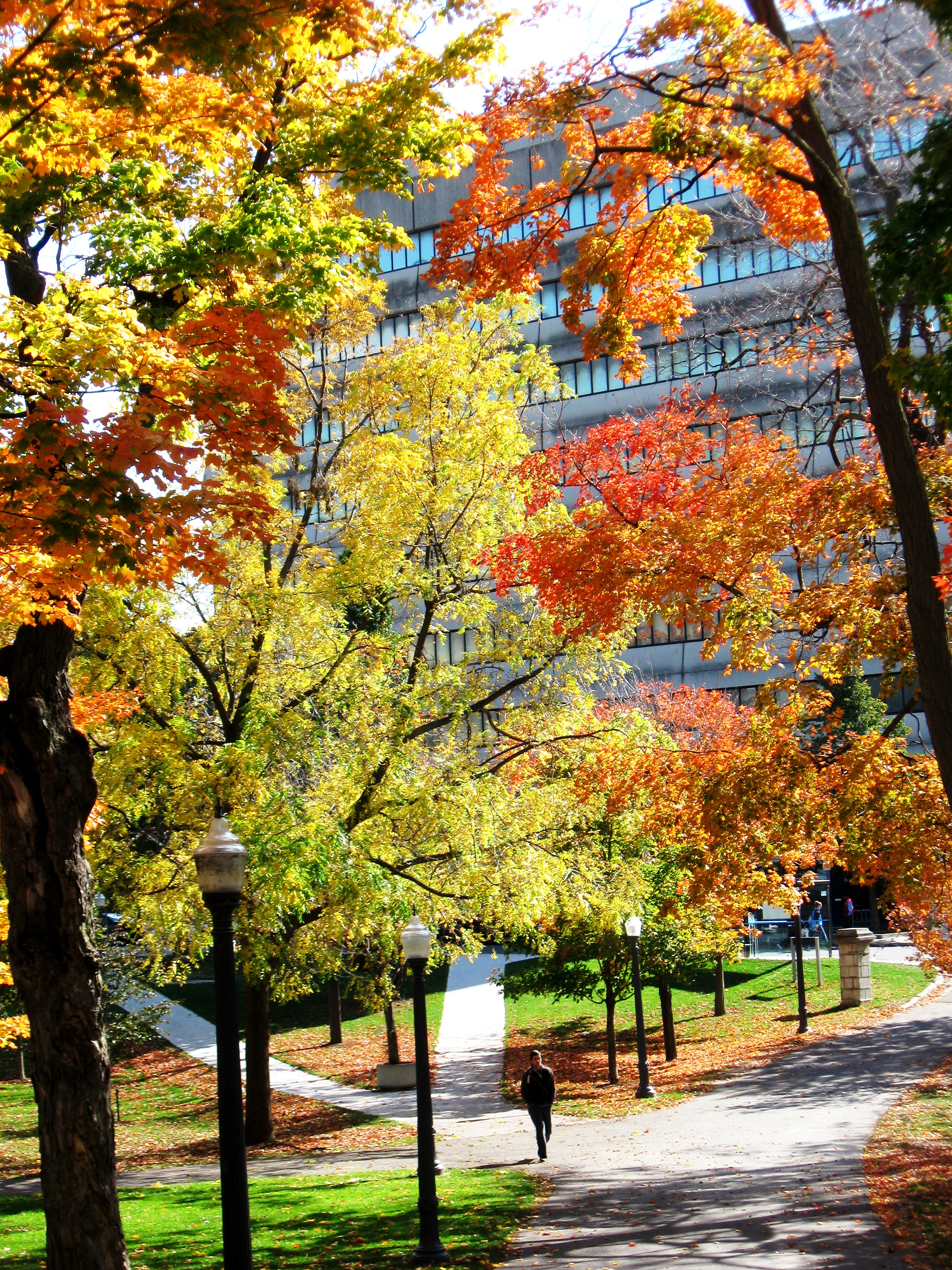
Botterell Hall houses the Centre for Neuroscience Studies, a university research centre

The university operates six research centres and institutes, the Centre for Neuroscience Studies, GeoEngineering Centre, High Performance Computing Virtual Laboratory, Centre for Health Innovation, Sudbury Neutrino Observatory Institute, and the Southern African Research Centre. The Sudbury Neutrino Observatory's director, Arthur B. McDonald, is a member of the university's physics department. The observatory managed the SNO experiment, which showed the solution to the solar neutrino problem was neutrinos change flavour (type) as they propagate through the Sun. The SNO experiment proved a non-zero mass neutrino exists. This was a major breakthrough in cosmology. In October 2015, Arthur B. McDonald and Takaaki Kajita (University of Tokyo) jointly received the Nobel Prize in Physics for illustration of neutrino change identities and identification of mass. This is the first Nobel Prize awarded to a Queen's University researcher. In 1976, urologist Alvaro Morales, along with his colleagues, developed the first clinically effective immunotherapy for cancer by adapting the Bacille Calmette-Guérin tuberculosis vaccine for treatment of early stage bladder cancer.

Other research facilities include the Queen's University Biological Station, the largest inland field station in Canada. The Biological Station's mandate is to provide teaching and research opportunities in biology and other related sciences, as well as the conservation of the local environment. Researchers and students have gathered at the biological station to conduct research and participate in courses spanning ecology, evolution, conservation, and environmental biology. In 2002, it became part of the United Nations–recognized Thousand Islands – Frontenac Arch Biosphere Reserve.

Queen's University has a joint venture with McGill University, operating an academic publishing house known as the McGill-Queen's University Press. It publishes original peer-reviewed works in all areas of the social sciences and humanities. While the press's emphasis is on providing an outlet for Canadian authors and scholarship, the press also publishes authors throughout the world. It has over 2,800 books in print. The publishing house was known as the McGill University Press prior to amalgamating with Queen's in 1969.

=== Admission ===
The requirements for admission differ among students from Ontario, students from other provinces in Canada, and international students due to the lack of uniformity in marking schemes. In 2020, 38.2% of applications to full-time first-year studies were accepted. In 2013, the secondary school average for full-time first-year students at Queen's was 89% overall, with the Commerce, Education, and Engineering faculties having the highest entrance averages, at 91.7%, 90.8%, and 90.6% respectively. The application process emphasizes the optional Personal Statement of Experience. The statement expresses how the applicant's personal experiences may contribute to the university. It focuses on qualifications and involvement outside of academics and is an important factor in determining admission. Several faculties require applicants to submit a supplementary essay.

Students may apply for financial aid such as the Ontario Student Assistance Program and Canada Student Loans and Grants through the federal and provincial governments. The financial aid provided may come in the form of loans, grants, bursaries, scholarships, fellowships, debt reduction, interest relief, and work programs. In the 2010–11 academic year, Queen's provided $36.5 million worth of student need–based and merit-based financial assistance.

== Student life ==
Demographics of student body (2017–2018) (Note: The following includes both full-time, and part-time students.)
	Undergraduate (Note: The following includes students enrolled in first professional degree programs.)	Graduate
Male	41.1%	49.7%
Female	58.9%	50.3%
Canadian student	93.3%	78.7%
International student	6.7%	21.3%

The student body of Queen's is represented by two primary students' unions, the Alma Mater Society (AMS) for all undergraduate students, as well as Medicine and MBA students, and the Society of Graduate and Professional Students for graduate and law students. The AMS of Queen's University is the oldest undergraduate student government in Canada. It recognizes more than 200 student clubs and organizations. All accredited extracurricular organizations at Queen's fall under the jurisdiction of either the AMS or the Society of Graduate and Professional Students.

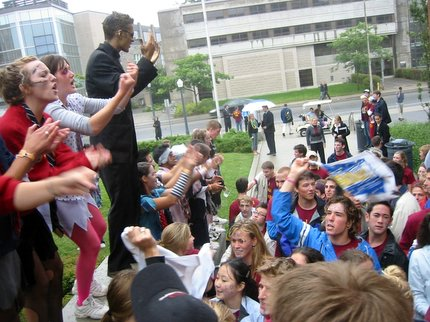
Frosh Week festivities at Queen's University, July 2006

The organizations and clubs accredited at Queen's cover a wide range of interests, including academics, culture, religion, social issues, and recreation. The oldest accredited club at Queen's is the Queen's Debating Union, which was formed in 1843 as the Dialectic Society. The Dialectic Society served as a form of student government until the AMS was formed from the Dialectic Society in 1858. The Queen's Bands is a student marching band, founded in 1905, consisting of the colour guard, pipe band, brass band, drum corps, highland dancers, and cheerleaders. Fraternities and sororities have been banned at the university since a ruling by the AMS in 1933. The ruling was passed in response to the formation of two fraternities in the 1920s. No accredited sororities have ever existed at Queen's.

The Engineering Society (EngSoc) is the representative body for engineering students. Formed in 1897, it has 3,000 members on campus, 15,000 active alumni, and an annual budget of $1.7 million. EngSoc oversees about 45 student-run initiatives.

The AMS also manages the Student Constable peer-to-peer security service at the university. It is responsible for ensuring the safety of patrons and staff at sanctioned events and venues across the campus, enforcing the governing regulations of the AMS, and upholding regulations stipulated in the Liquor Licence Act of Ontario. Student Constables do not serve as the university's primary security service. The university administration operates its own security service, which is registered in Ontario as a private security service. As of March 2012, the Student Constables are funded through a mandatory $10 fee levied on undergraduates annually by the AMS.

The Agnes Benidickson Tricolour Award and induction in the Tricolour Society is the highest tribute that can be paid to a student for valuable and distinguished service to the university in non-athletic, extra-curricular activities.

=== Media ===
Queen's University's students operate a number of media outlets throughout campus. The Queen's Journal is Queen's main student newspaper. During the academic year, the journal publishes two issues a week, until the last month of the semester, when only one issue is published each week. In total the Queen's Journal publishes 28 issues a year. The newspaper was established in 1873, making it one of the oldest student newspapers in Canada.

In 2013, The Journal decided to reduce its print schedule from twice a week to once a week—past volumes used to consist of 40 print issues. In supplement, for the first two months of each semester, they publish new content online throughout the week. In 2019, The Journal reduced its print schedule from once a week to once every other week. Online content continues to be published instead of a Tuesday print issue.

The other weekly student publication from Queen's is Golden Words, a weekly satirical humour publication managed by the Engineering Society.

Queen's student population runs a radio station, CFRC. Queen's radio station is the longest-running campus-based broadcaster in the world, and the second-longest-running radio station in the world, surpassed only by the Marconi companies. The station's first public broadcast was on 27 October 1923, when the football game between Queen's and McGill was called play-by-play. Since 2001, the station has broadcast on a 24-hour schedule. In 1980, a student-run television service called Queen's TV (QTV) was established; as of 2011, episodes aired every weekday on its website and every Wednesday on local television. In 2015, QTV was amalgamated with two other student-run services, Yearbook & Design Services (YDS) and Convocation Services, to form "Studio Q".

=== Sport ===
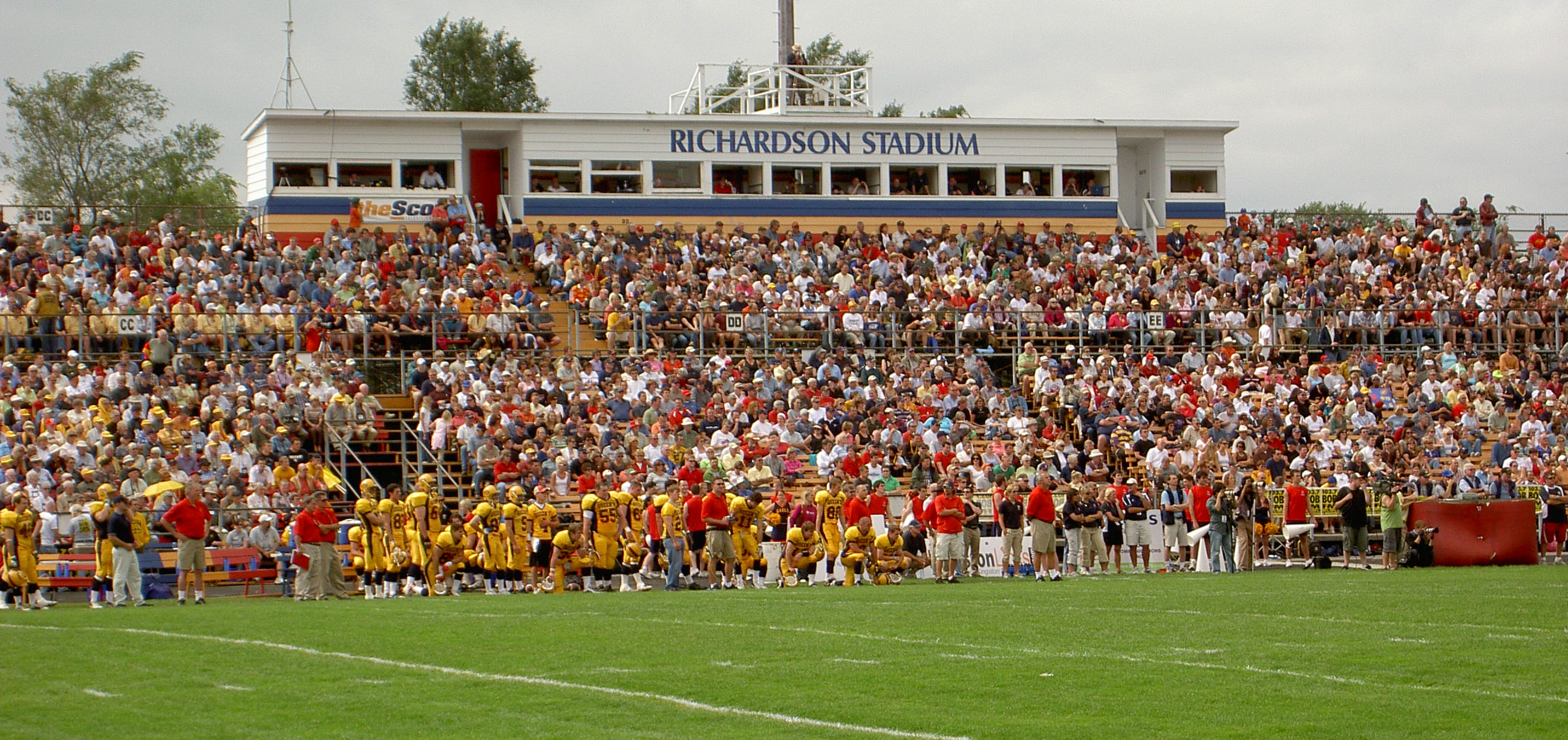
Richardson Memorial Stadium is the home to Queen's varsity football team

Sport teams at Queen's University are known as the Golden Gaels. The Golden Gaels sports teams participate in the U Sports' Ontario University Athletics conference for most varsity sports. Varsity teams at Queen's include basketball, cross country, freestyle wrestling, Canadian football, ice hockey, rowing, rugby, soccer, and volleyball. The men's rugby team won the OUA Championship consecutively from 2012 to 2016. The athletics program at Queen's University dates back to 1873. With 39 regional and national championships, Queen's football program has secured more championships than any other sport team at Queen's, and more than any other football team in Canada. Queen's and the University of Toronto are the only universities to have claimed Grey Cups (1922, 1923, and 1924), now the championship trophy for the Canadian Football League. Queen's also competed for the Stanley Cup in 1894–95, 1898–99, and 1905–06.

Queen's University has a number of athletic facilities open to both varsity teams and students. The stadium with the largest seating capacity at Queen's is Richardson Memorial Stadium. Built in 1971, the stadium seats 8,500 and is home to the varsity football team. The stadium has also hosted a number of international games, including Canada's second-round 2006 FIFA World Cup qualification games and the inaugural match of the Colonial Cup, an international rugby league challenge match. The stadium reopened for its inaugural football game on 17 September 2016, after an extensive revitalization. Other athletic facilities at Queen's include the Athletic and Recreation Centre, which houses a number of gymnasiums and pools; Tindall Field, a multi-season playing field and jogging track; Nixon Field, home to the school's rugby teams; and West Campus Fields, which are used by a number of varsity teams and student intramural leagues.

==== Rivalries ====
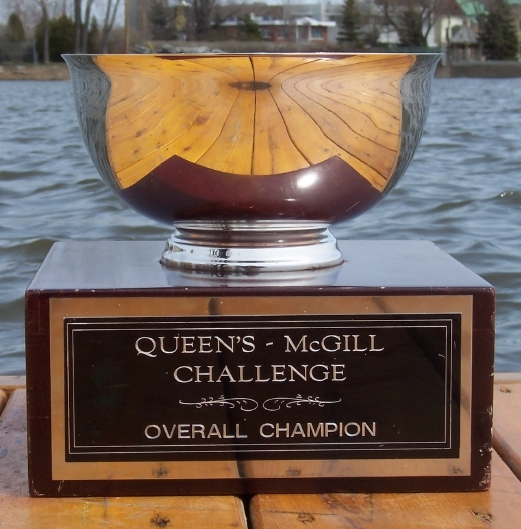
The Lorne Gales Challenge Cup, a trophy awarded to the winners of an annual boat race between Queen's and McGill University

Queen's maintains an academic and athletic rivalry with McGill University. Competition between rowing athletes at the two schools has inspired an annual boat race between the two universities in the spring of each year since 1997, inspired by the famous Oxford-Cambridge Boat Race. The football rivalry, which started in 1884, ended after Canadian university athletic divisions were reorganized in 2000; the Ontario-Quebec Intercollegiate Football Conference was divided into Ontario University Athletics and Quebec Student Sports Federation. The rivalry returned in 2002 when it transferred to the annual home-and-home hockey games between the two institutions. Queen's students refer to these matches as "Kill McGill" games and usually show up in Montreal in atypically large numbers to cheer on the Queen's Golden Gaels hockey team. In 2007, McGill students arrived in busloads to cheer on the McGill Redmen, occupying a third of Queen's Jock Harty Arena.

The school also competes in the annual Old Four (IV) soccer tournament, along with McGill, the University of Toronto, and the University of Western Ontario.

== Insignias and other representations ==
=== Symbols ===
Queen's official colours are gold, blue, and red. Queen's colours are also used on the school flag. It displays three vertical stripes, one for each colour. In the upper-left corner on the blue stripe is a yellow crown, symbolizing the royal charter. The university also has a ceremonial flag, which is reserved for official university uses. The ceremonial flag is a square design of the Queen's coat of arms.

Blue, gold and red are the official colours of the university, and can be seen on its flag

The university also has a tartan, made up of six colours, each representing an academic discipline: blue (Medicine), red (Arts & Science), gold (Applied Science), white (Nursing Science), maroon (Commerce & MBA), light blue (Kinesiology and Physical Education), and purple (Theology). The tartan was created in 1966 by Judge John Matheson and is registered under the Scottish Tartans Authority.

==== Coat of arms ====
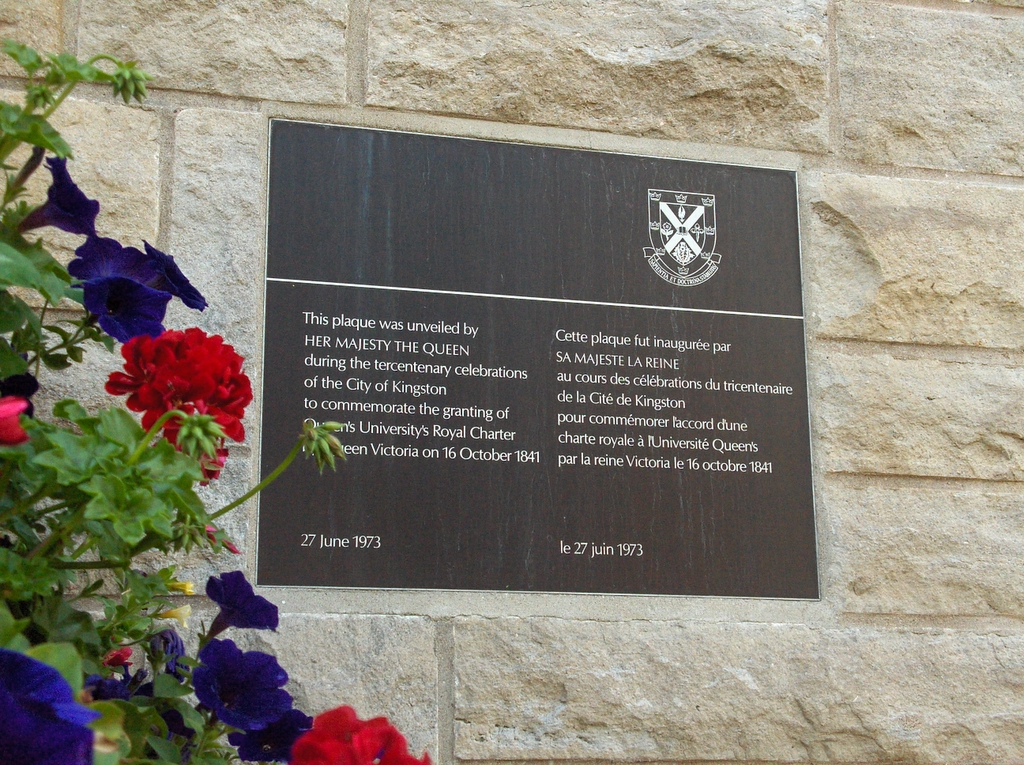
The university's coat of arms engraved on a plaque presented by Queen Elizabeth II

The coat of arms appeared as early as 1850 but was not registered with the College of Arms until 1953. The coat of arms was registered with the Scottish equivalent of the College of Arms, the Lord Lyon King of Arms, in 1981 and with the Canadian Heraldic Authority during Queen's sesquicentennial celebrations in 1991. The coat of arms is based on that of the University of Edinburgh, the institution after which Queen's was modelled.

The coat of arms consists of a gold shield with red edges, divided into four triangular compartments by a blue, diagonal St. Andrew's Cross. A golden book, symbolizing learning, sits open at the centre of the cross. In each of the four compartments is an emblem of the university's Canadian and British origins: a pine tree for Canada, a thistle for Scotland, a rose for England, and a shamrock for Ireland. The border is decorated with eight gold crowns, symbolic of Queen Victoria and the university's Royal Charter.

=== Motto and song ===
Queen's motto, from Isaiah 33:6, is Sapientia et Doctrina Stabilitas. The Latin motto is literally translated as "Wisdom and knowledge shall be the stability of thy times," and has been in use since the 1850s. A number of songs are commonly played and sung at events such as commencement, convocation, and athletic contests, including the "Queen's College Colours" (1897), also known as "Our University Yell" and "Oil Thigh", with words by A.E. Lavell, sung to the tune of "John Brown's Body". "Oil Thigh", created in 1891, consists of the old song "Queen's College Colours". The name "Oil Thigh" comes from the chorus of the song, which begins with the Gaelic words "oil thigh". The modern version of the song was crafted in 1985, when a line was changed to include Queen's women athletes in the cheer.

== Notable people ==
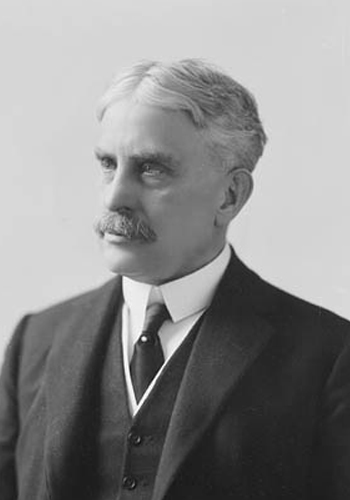
Sir Robert Borden, 8th Prime Minister of Canada

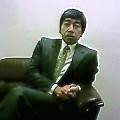
Norihito, Prince Takamado, member of the Imperial House of Japan

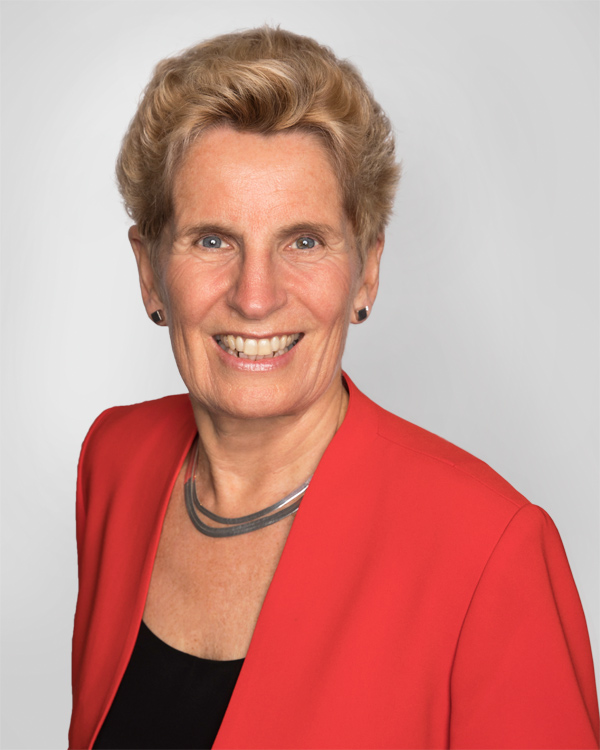
Kathleen Wynne, 25th Premier of Ontario and first LGBT Premier in Canada

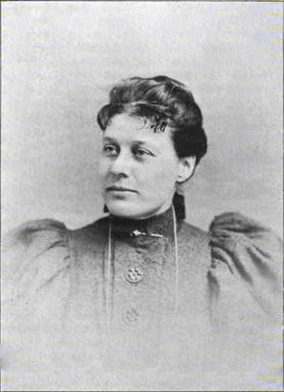
Ella Blaylock Atherton, first woman in Quebec to receive a medical diploma from a Canadian institution

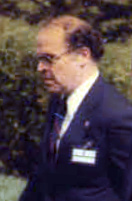
Derek Burney, former chairman and CEO of Bell Canada, Canadian ambassador to the United States

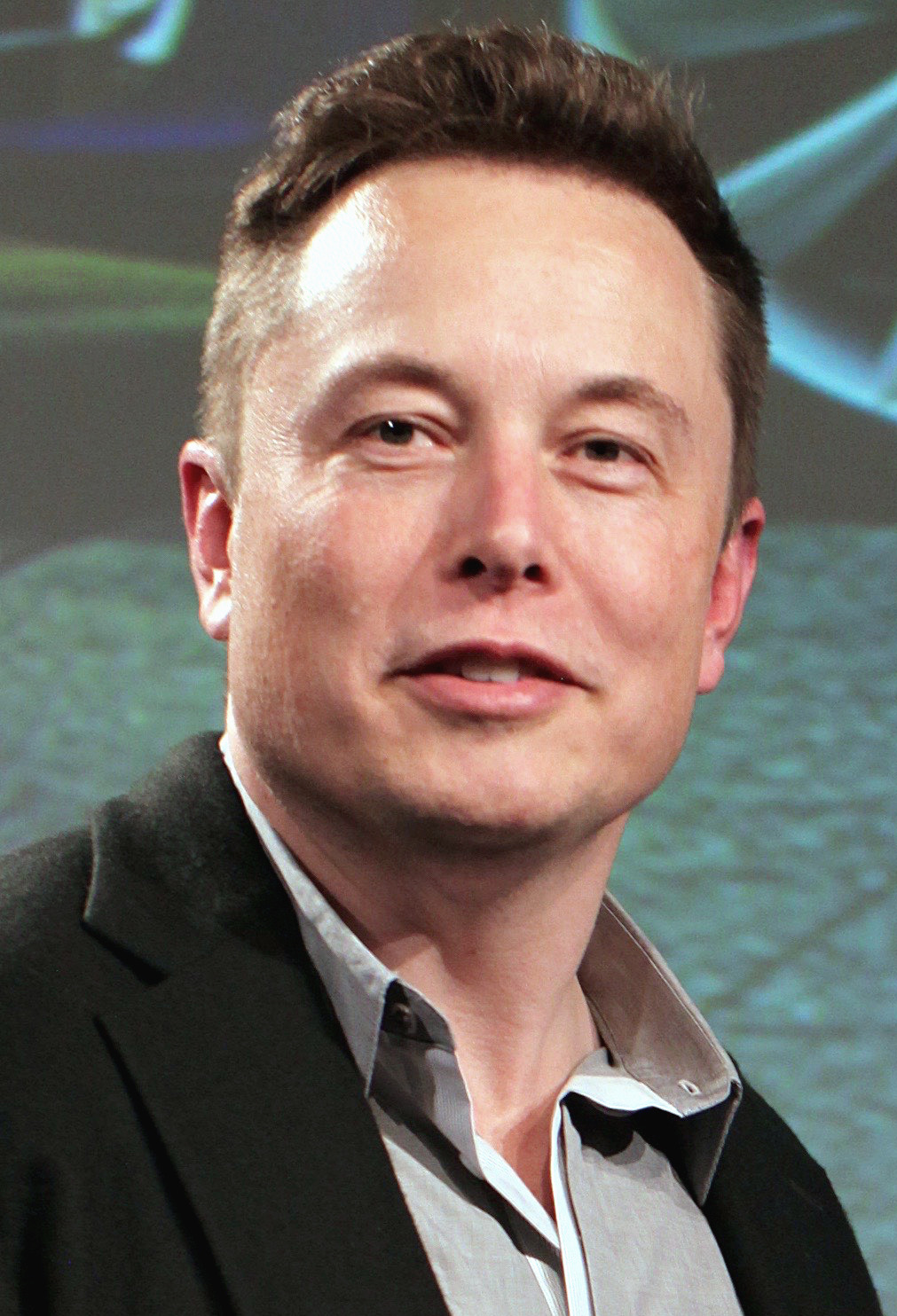
Elon Musk, a founder, CEO, or both of PayPal, SpaceX, Tesla, OpenAI, The Boring Company and Neuralink

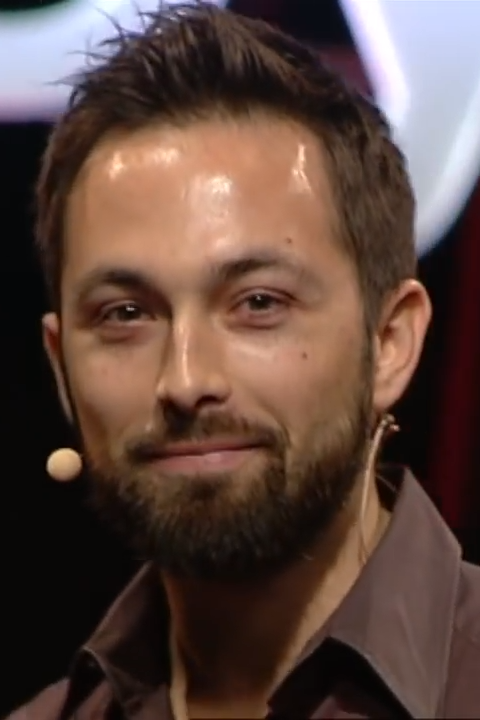
Derek Muller, science communicator and creator of popular YouTube channel Veritasium

Queen's graduates have found success in a variety of fields, heading diverse institutions in the public and private sectors. In 2011, the university had over 131,000 alumni, living in 156 countries. Queen's faculty and graduates have won many awards, including the Nobel Prize, the Turing Award, and the Victoria Cross. As of 2016, 57 Queen's students and graduates had been awarded the Rhodes Scholarship. Queen's is also a partner of the Loran Scholars Foundation, with over 20 Loran Scholars having attended the university. In 2013, the artist Raine Storey began attendance at Queen's after being the first visual artist to ever receive the award.

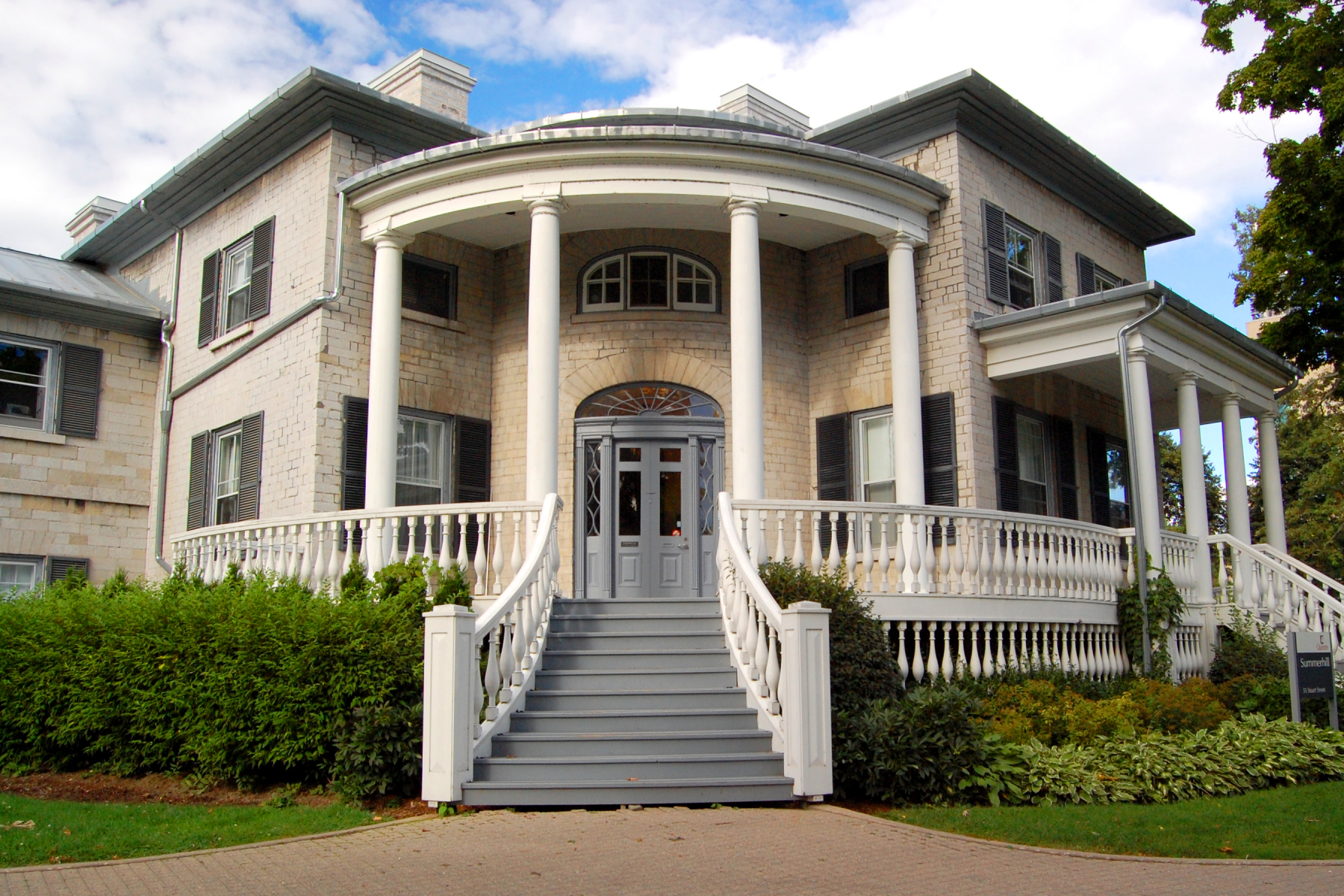
The university's office of advancement, housed at the Summerhill building, manages relations between Queen's and its alumni

Several Nobel laureates are associated with the university, including faculty member Arthur B. McDonald, who received the Nobel Prize in Physics for fundamental research elucidating neutrino change identities and mass; former National Research Council postdoctoral fellow at Queen's Sir Fraser Stoddart, awarded the Nobel Prize in Chemistry "for the design and synthesis of molecular machines"; and David Card, who shared the Nobel Memorial Prize in Economic Sciences in 2021 "for his empirical contributions to labour economics". Another notable individual associated with the university is Sandford Fleming, an engineer who first proposed the use of a universal time standard and the former Chancellor of Queen's. Notable alumni in the field of science include Adolfo de Bold, who won the Gairdner Foundation Award for the discovery and isolation of atrial natriuretic peptide, and Shirley Tilghman, a microbiologist and former President of Princeton University.

Notable Chancellors who were once politicians, include Robert Borden, Prime Minister of Canada, and provincial premiers Peter Lougheed and Charles Avery Dunning. Roland Michener, Governor General of Canada from 1967 to 1974, served as Chancellor from 1973 to 1980. Many alumni have gained international prominence for serving in government, including Prince Takamado, member of the Imperial House of Japan, Godwin Friday, the fifth Prime Minister of Saint Vincent and the Grenadines, and Kenneth O. Hall, the fifth Governor General of Jamaica. The 29th Governor General of Canada, David Johnston, is also a graduate and former faculty member of the university. Four Canadian premiers are also alumni of Queen's: William Aberhart, the 7th Premier of Alberta, Frank McKenna, the 27th Premier of New Brunswick, Kathleen Wynne, the 25th Premier of Ontario. and Susan Holt, the 35th Premier of New Brunswick. The 14th Premier of Alberta, Alison Redford, also attended the university for two years. Thomas Cromwell, a Justice of the Supreme Court of Canada, is an alumnus.

Prominent alumni who became leaders in business include Derek Burney, former chairman and CEO of Bell Canada; Donald J. Carty, chairman of Virgin America and Porter Airlines and former chairman and CEO of AMR Corporation; Earle McLaughlin, former president and CEO of Royal Bank of Canada; Gordon Nixon, former president and CEO of the Royal Bank of Canada; Kimbal Musk, co-founder of Zip2; and F. C. Kohli, founder of Tata Consultancy Services. Alumnus David A. Dodge was the 7th Governor of the Bank of Canada and the 13th Chancellor of Queen's. Elon Musk, founder of SpaceX, and CEO of Tesla, Inc., attended Queen's for two years.

== See also ==
- Higher education in Ontario
- List of universities in Canada
- Royal eponyms in Canada
