= The Queen's Journal =

Student newspaper in Ontario, Canada

- Type: Bi-weekly student newspaper
- Format: Compact
- Publisher: Alma Mater Society of Queen's University
- Founded: 1873
- Headquarters: 190 University Ave., Kingston, Ontario, Canada
- Circulation: 3,000
- Website: www.queensjournal.ca

The Queen's Journal is the main student-run newspaper at Queen's University at Kingston in Kingston, Ontario. The paper was founded in October 1873 and has been continually publishing ever since. It is the oldest continuously published student newspaper in Canada and the second-oldest in North America, after The Harvard Crimson, which began publishing in January 1873. The Journal is published twice a week, usually on Tuesdays and Fridays. The 2026-27 Editor in Chief is Jonathan Reilly. The publication is an editorially autonomous paper, guaranteed by the Alma Mater Society of Queen's University and its constitution and by-laws.

Journal alumni can often be found working for many of North America's major newspapers and media outlets. Notable names include Adam Shortt; former Ottawa mayor Charlotte Whitton; former Toronto Star editor-in-chief Giles Gherson; former Ottawa Citizen editor-in-chief Scott Anderson; former editor-in-chief of The Globe and Mail, John Stackhouse; former Toronto Star managing editor Jane Davenport; author, academic, and former Toronto Star columnist James Laxer; novelist Robertson Davies; award-winning science journalist Terry Collins; Al Jazeera's Ali Velshi; Toronto Star reporters Kristin Rushowy and Victoria Gibson; former ABC News correspondent Jeffrey Kofman; and Jeffrey Simpson, author and former political columnist for The Globe and Mail.

== See also ==
- CFRC-FM
- List of newspapers in Canada
- List of student newspapers in Canada
