= Historica Canada =

Historical society dedicated to Canadian history and citizenship

- Formation: November 9, 1999; 26 years ago
- Founded at: Toronto, Ontario
- Merger of: The Historica Foundation of Canada and The Dominion Institute
- Registration no.: BN: 885434720RR0001
- Legal status: Registered charity
- Purpose: Canadian history
- Headquarters: 10 Adelaide Street East, Suite 400, Toronto, Ontario M5C 1J3
- Region served: Canada
- Official language: English, French
- Key people: Anthony Wilson-Smith (President & CEO)
- Subsidiaries: The Canadian Encyclopedia; Encounters with Canada; Heritage Minutes
- Website: www.historicacanada.ca
- Formerly called: The Historica-Dominion Institute

Historica Canada is a Canadian charitable organization dedicated to promoting the country's history and citizenship. All of its programs are offered bilingually and reach more than 28 million Canadians annually.

A registered national charitable organization, Historica Canada was originally established as the Historica-Dominion Institute following a 2009 merger of two existing groups—the Historica Foundation of Canada and The Dominion Institute—and changed to its present name in September 2013. Anthony Wilson-Smith has been president and CEO of the organization since September 2012, with the board of directors being chaired (as of January 2021) by First National Financial-co-founder Stephen Smith.

Some of the organizations best-known programs include its collection of Heritage Minutes—60-second vignettes re-enacting important and remarkable incidents in Canada's history—and The Canadian Encyclopedia. Historica Canada regularly conducts public opinion polls and creates educational videos, podcasts, and learning tools. It also operates the Ottawa-based Encounters with Canada youth program.

== Current programs ==
=== Canada During COVID-19 ===
To commemorate the era of COVID-19 in Canada for future generations, Historica Canada launched Canada During COVID-19, a "living archive" of the Canadian experience during the coronavirus pandemic beginning in 2020.

Historica Canada invites people to add to this grassroots project in any form—be it through photograph, video, GIF, music, art, or writing—using the project's hashtag and tagging the project's page on Instagram (and Historica Canada itself on other social media).

=== Indigenous Arts & Stories ===
Indigenous Arts & Stories, on hiatus for the 2019/2020 year, is the largest art and creative-writing competition for Indigenous youth in Canada. Starting in 2005 as exclusively a writing competition, the contest expanded to accept arts submissions in 2010–2011.

The program invites First Nations, Métis, and Inuit artists aged 11 to 29 to interpret an aspect of their culture and heritage through literary and visual arts. The winning submissions are reviewed and selected by a jury (one for arts and another for stories) of accomplished Indigenous authors, artists, and community leaders. The contest was born out of a joint project of the Dominion Institute and Doubleday Canada: Our Story, a short story compilation that brings together 9 leading Indigenous authors, including Thomas King, Tomson Highway, and Tantoo Cardinal. In its 15-year run, more than 5,500 youth have participated in the Indigenous Arts & Stories program.

Jury members include Bonnie Devine, Brian Maracle, Drew Hayden Taylor, John Kim Bell, Kent Monkman, Lee Maracle, Maxine Noel, and Rachel Qitsualik-Tinsley, among others. Honorary Patrons of the program have included Assembly of First Nations National Chief Perry Bellegarde, Inuit Tapiriit Kanatami President Terry Audla, and Métis National Council President Clément Chartier.

=== Citizenship Challenge ===
The Citizenship Challenge allows participants to test their Canadian knowledge by studying for and writing a mock citizenship exam in English or French. Presented by Historica Canada and funded by Immigration, Refugees and Citizenship Canada, the Citizenship Challenge has tested of over 1.05 million people as of January 2021. As a studying resource for both the challenge and for actual citizenship tests themselves, Historica Canada offers a "Citizenship Collection" through the Canadian Encyclopedia.

=== The Canadian Encyclopedia ===
The Canadian Encyclopedia is a free bilingual online resource that offers the large collection of authored and continuously updated articles focused on Canada and Canadiana.

While other nations publish localized reference works, it is distinguished by its mandate to comprehensively document a single nation in both English and French.

Established in 1985, the Encyclopedia began in print form before transitioning to CD-ROM, then moving to a digital format in 2001. In 2003, the Encyclopedia incorporated the content of the Encyclopedia of Music in Canada, which included around 3,000 articles and 500 illustrations. In October 2013, the Encyclopedia released its present "enhanced digital interactive" version online, with multimedia augmented through acquisition and partnerships with Maclean’s magazine and The Canadian Press. These interactive features include "curated content exhibits, interactive timelines,…and a user-generated content map" that allows users to "share their stories," as well as classroom resources, quizzes, and themed study guides for teachers and parents to use. With its online format, the Encyclopedia is now able to be updated on a daily basis—also allowing for immediate updates to important events—as well as having a staff of six full-time editors regularly write and commission new articles.

As of 2021, the Encyclopedia's collection consists of more than 20,700 bilingual articles by more than 5,000 authors including David Suzuki, Margaret Atwood, Marc Laurendeau, Natasha Henry, Pierre Berton, and Tim Cook.

==== Learning resources ====
Historica Canada produces numerous learning tools for educators and students through the Canadian Encyclopedia. Some examples include: Women in Canadian History; Residential Schools in Canada; Indigenous Perspectives Education Guide; Official Languages Act; and Black History in Canada Education Guide.

Historica Canada also provides some of its content through iTunes University, where users can browse materials organized in course collections along such themes as Women in Canadian History and Asian-Canadian History.

=== Encounters With Canada (Closed August 2020 due to COVID-19 Pandemic) ===
Encounters with Canada was a bilingual program for teenage students (14 to 17 years old) in which participants spend a themed week in Ottawa to meet other young people from across Canada, and explore future career pathways. With over 113,000 youth having participated in the program, EWC was Canada's largest youth forum.

EWC was established in 1982, originally as a program of the Canadian Unity Council. Its first year was held at the Terry Fox Canadian Youth Centre, offering 11 weeks, from September to early December, with six themes: Arts & Culture, Science & Technology, Canadian Studies, Natural Resources & Environment, Law, and the Economy. Due to the COVID-19 pandemic, the program closed in August 2020.

=== Heritage Minutes ===
The Heritage Minutes is a collection of 60-second short films, each recreating or depicting a significant person, event, or story—those of great importance, accomplishment, tragedy, and bravery—in Canadian history. Shown on television, in cinemas, and online, some topics covered by the Heritage Minutes include Terry Fox; the Asahi Baseball team; Lucy Maud Montgomery; the Acadian Deportation; the invention of Basketball; residential schools; Viola Desmond; Jennie Trout; and Winnie the Pooh.

The Minutes were first released in 1991 by The CRB Foundation and re-launched by Historica Canada in 2012. With the tagline "A part of our heritage", the Minutes themselves have since become a piece of Canadian culture and have featured appearances over the years by some of Canada's best-known actors, including Jared Keeso, Michael Shanks, Calum Worthy, Colm Feore, Dan Aykroyd, Jean l'Italien, and Kate Nelligan. Voice-over end narration for the Heritage Minutes has been provided by such recognizable voices as Peter Mansbridge, k.d. lang, Adrienne Clarkson, and Lloyd Robertson.

=== The Memory Project ===
The Memory Project is a volunteer speakers bureau that arranges for Canadian Forces members and Canadian veterans (including those of World War I, WWII, the Korean War, and peacekeeping missions) to share their stories of military service at school and community events across Canada.

The Memory Project Digital Archive is an extensive online collection of the oral histories and digitized artefacts & memorabilia of veterans and Armed Forces members, providing over 3,000 firsthand accounts, 10,000 photos, and 1,500 other original artifacts (letters, memorabilia) that chronicle Canada's military heritage.

Reaching over 3 million Canadians since 2001, the Project is an initiative of Historica Canada made possible with the federal government's Departments of Veterans Affairs and of Canadian Heritage. The Project also partners with the Royal Canadian Legion, Korean Veterans Association of Canada, Canadian War Museum, Library and Archives Canada, Concordia University Centre for Oral History and Digital Storytelling, and Sunnybrook Health Sciences Centre.

== Past and commemorative programs ==
Beyond its core programs, Historica Canada also offers commemorative programs tied to specific events. Past, including commemorative, programs of Historica Canada include:

- 101 Things was a ranked list of 101 people, places, symbols, events, and innovations that survey respondents believed to define Canada. The project was initiated in spring 2008, when Historica Canada (then the Dominion Institute) commissioned Ipsos Reid to undertake a large national survey asking Canadians what they believe to be the country's most defining cultural touchstones. Participants included over 3,000 Canadians, as well as educators and Order-of-Canada recipients from across Canada.
- Asia-Canada was a project featuring numerous articles regarding Asian Canadians, including a timeline of key events, profiles of various Asian cultures in Canada, multiculturalism in Canada, and biographies of notable Asian Canadians. The content of the project can now be found on The Canadian Encyclopedia.
- Black History in Canada was an educational guide for students to gain more knowledge and appreciation of the Black-Canadian experience, drawing from Lawrence Hill's historical fiction, The Book of Negroes. The guide is structured around "themes of journey, slavery, human rights, passage to Canada and contemporary culture."
- Diamond Jubilee was an educational site that explores Canada's constitutional monarchy and the role of the Queen in Canadian history, identity, and culture. It was created in celebration of the 60th anniversary of Queen Elizabeth II's reign.
- ExploreSesqui was a program that allowed educators and students to engage with Horizon, a 360° film (produced by SESQUI Inc) that gave audiences a virtual cross-country trip, viewing Canada's natural environment and various Canadian ways of life.
- Here's My Canada was a multilingual, nationwide contest in which Canadian participants were asked to express "what Canada means to them" in a 30-second video. It was a Canada 150 initiative of Historica Canada, funded by the Government of Canada and the Bank of Montreal.
- My Parks Pass was a program made to introduce Canadian youths to the country's natural heritage. The program was created in partnership with Parks Canada, Canadian Geographic Education, and the Canadian Wildlife Federation.
- Passages Canada was a national storytelling program that invited newcomers and established Canadians alike to share their personal experiences of identity, heritage, and immigration, in order to foster cross-cultural dialogue and greater appreciation for one another among Canadians. More than 1,000 volunteers participated in this initiative.
- Stories of Sir John A. was a project created to raise awareness about the life and legacy of Sir John. A Macdonald, a Father of Confederation and the first prime minister of Canada. The project was launched in celebration of Macdonald's 200th birthday in 2015.
- Toronto in Time was a free iOS and Android app that highlighted the history of Toronto through "then and now" photos, slideshows, trails, and historical stories for over 150 sites in the city. The app was a joint initiative of Historica Canada, Museum Services of the City of Toronto, and Heritage Toronto; and with funding from the Ontario Ministry of Tourism, Culture and Sport, and the Department of Canadian Heritage.
- War of 1812 was an initiative created to inform students of the War of 1812, in commemoration of the bicentennial of the War. The program included four free education guides (War of 1812 Education Guide, Borders and Boundaries, Aboriginal Peoples, War of 1812: Inquiry Guide) and two Heritage Minute learning tools (Richard Pierpoint, and the Battle of Queenston Heights). During the bicentennial, the program also hosted two national, bilingual competitions: "Make Your own Heritage Minute" and the "War of 1812 Writing and Arts Challenge."

== Other multimedia ==
Along with its core programs, Historica Canada also produces various educational media projects, all of which are created as free content to help promote learning and historical knowledge.

Historica Canada's video collection, in addition to its over-90 Heritage Minute shorts, includes more than 150 online educational videos.

Inspiring Innovators (2020) is a four-part animated video series exploring "Canadian innovations that have made the world a better and safer place." Created in partnership with the Rideau Hall Foundation, the series features stories from a book by Tom Jenkins and former Canadian Governor General David Johnston titled Ingenious: How Canadians Made the World Smarter, Smaller, Kinder, Safer, Healthier, Wealthier and Happier.

Between 2019 and 2020, the organization has produced two brief podcast series:

- Record of Service: a six-part podcast series presented by Historica Canada's Memory Project that presents interviews with Canada's veterans, ranging from codebreakers and code talkers to medical personnel to prisoners of war.
- Residential Schools: a three-part podcast series hosted by Shaneen Robinson-Desjarlais, created by Historica Canada as part of a broader awareness campaign commemorating the history and legacy of residential schools, as well as honouring the stories of First Nations, Métis, and Inuit survivors, their families, and communities. The audio from the podcast was also used by Historica Canada for a complimentary collection of animated videos.

In 2020, Historica Canada announced plans for a "Black History Podcast and Video Series," seeking a production company or team to develop a six-episode conversation-style podcast series (15–20 minutes each) and a three-part animated video series that adapts the podcast into visual form (3–5 minutes each), with a total budget of CA$75,000. The series is meant to explore key moments in Black-Canadian history through notable Black-Canadian scholars, writers, and community leaders in their own words.

== Board of directors ==
Historica Canada board of directors, as of May 2021
Name	Description
Alison Faulknor	Director of New Initiatives, The National Trust for Canada
Ann Dadson	fmr. President of Historica Canada
Arni C. Thorsteinson	President of Shelter Canadian Properties Ltd.
Beverley McLachlin	fmr. Chief Justice of Canada (2000–2017)
Charles R. Bronfman	Chairman of The Andrea and Charles Bronfman Philanthropies fmr. Co-chairman of The Seagram Company Ltd.
Daniel R. Woolf	Principal Emeritus and professor, Queen's University
David Johnston	28th Governor General of Canada
Eric Maldoff	Partner, Lapointe Rosenstein Marchand Melançon LLB
Gary Doer	23rd Canadian Ambassador to the United States fmr. Premier of Manitoba
Jeffrey Orridge	Chairman of Tiidal Gaming Group 13th Commissioner of the Canadian Football League
Jim Leech	14th Chancellor of Queen's University Chair of MasterCard Foundation Chair Emeritus at Toronto General & Western Hospital Foundation Senior Advisor to McKinsey & Company rtd. President and CEO of Ontario Teachers' Pension Plan
L. Yves Fortier	International arbitrator at Cabinet Yves Fortier
Lynton Wilson	Chairman of CAE Inc. Chancellor of McMaster University
Michael Chong	Member of Parliament for Wellington-Halton Hills
Myra A. Freeman	fmr. Lieutenant-Governor of Nova Scotia
Naheed Nenshi	36th Mayor of Calgary
Peter Mansbridge	fmr. chief correspondent for CBC News fmr. anchor of The National
Rick Mercer	Host of The Rick Mercer Report
Stephen Smith	Chairman of the board President, and co-founder of First National Financial LLP
Thomas Edward Kierans	Deputy Chair of the Lunenfeld-Tanenbaum Research Institute fmr. President and CEO of the C. D. Howe Institute fmr. President of McLeod Young Weir Ltd. fmr. Chair of council and vice president of the Social Sciences and Humanities Research Council fmr. Director of Mount Sinai Hospital, Canadian International Council, and Manulife Financial fmr. Chairman of the Canadian Journalism Foundation, the Canadian Institute for Advanced Research, and Petro-Canada
Trina McQueen	President of Hutton-Belleville Inc.

== Arms ==
Coat of arms of Historica Canada

Notes
Granted 3 April 2002.
Crest
Issuant from a circlet of poppy flowers Proper a demi bear grasping in its paws a parliamentary mace Or.
Escutcheon
Argent within a bordure rayonné a maple leaf Gules charged with an astrolabe Or.
Supporters
Dexter an allegorical figure for Canada holding in the dexter hand a branch of laurel sinister a Shawnee warrior tempore 1812 holding in the sinister hand a gun both standing on a rocky compartment Proper.

== See also ==
- History of Canada
