= Sunfish Lake (disambiguation) =

Sunfish Lake is a city in Minnesota, United States.

Sunfish Lake may also refer to:

- Sunfish Lake (Minnesota), a lake in Minnesota, United States
- Sunfish Lake (Ontario), a lake in Ontario, Canada

== See also ==
- Sunfish Pond, a lake in Worthington State Forest, New Jersey, U.S.
