= Queen's Bush =

Region in Ontario, Canada

Coordinates: 43°39′16.68″N 80°42′10.14″W

The Queen's Bush was an area of what is now Southwestern Ontario, between Waterloo County and Lake Huron, that was set aside as clergy reserves by the colonial government. It is known as the location of communities established by Black settlers, many formerly enslaved in the United States, in what would become Canada. Established in 1820 and known as the Queen's Bush Settlement, the community grew to more than 2,000. In the early 1840s, the land on which they lived was surveyed for future sale. Following the survey, many of the Black residents were unable to pay for the land and migrated out of Queen's Bush.

== History ==
Queen's Bush was a large tract of land between Lake Huron, Georgian Bay, and lands developed in the east and the southeast. It bordered what are today the Townships of Wellesley and Peel. The land was acquired by Francis Bond Head on behalf of the Upper Canada in 1836 as part of the Manitowaning Treaty with the Ojibway of Manitoulin Island and the Saugeen Peninsula. The terms of the treaty were later called into question as Bond Head had Indigenous leaders sign a copy of a speech rather than a negotiated agreement.

The area was densely wooded with an abundance of wildlife, and the soil was well suited for agricultural endeavours. In a history of Bruce County, Norman Robertson speculates that the land was so named in order to distinguish it from other large tracts of land purchased from the Crown from groups including the Canada Company and the German Company.

The land was settled later than other tracts in Southwestern Ontario because it had been set aside as clergy reserves in what is now Canada for the maintenance of the Protestant church, which received money upon rental or sale of the land. Unlike other clergy reserves, in which every seventh plot was set aside, the Queen's Bush was reserved in its entirety. In 1830, the Commissioner of Crown Lands was made responsible for managing leases and settlement on unsurveyed land in Queen's Bush.

== Settlement ==
Beginning in 1820, squatters settled on unclaimed land within the Queen's Bush near what would become Heidelberg, St. Clements, and Wellesley, Ontario. There were some who also settled on the southern and eastern borders. Black settlers established farms in what are now the villages of Wallenstein and Hawkesville. Historian Natasha L. Henry-Dixon dates Black settlement of Queen's Bush to "as early as 1833." Some of these settlers had fought on the side of the British Crown in the Rebellions of 1837–1838, but many were either fugitives from the Southern American states or free Blacks from the Northern states. Queen's Bush, along with Toronto, Wellesley, Galt and Hamilton, was among the known Canadian terminals of the Underground Railroad. The Black community grew to over 2,000 people of African descent by the 1840s. They cleared tracts of land for farming. They also established churches and their children studied at schools run by missionaries.

In 1851, there were eight African Canadian families in the northern part of Wellesley Township. John Brown and Lucinda Green Brown settled in the area with their children. John had been an enslaved man from Virginia. His wife was born free and they met in Pennsylvania as he made his way to Canada. After starting out in Windsor and St. Catharines, they settled in Wellesley Township around 1843. They had eleven children. Brown owned one cow, one horse, and 120 acres. Keith Bell, the great-great grandson of John Brown, and grandson of Daniel Brown, created a video, Mutual Respect of the Brown family's life in Queen's Bush and of his son, Daniel's settlement in the United States.

=== Survey of land ===
In the 1840s, the government ordered surveys of the district for settlement. The decision was prompted by a heavy influx of migrants from countries such as England, Scotland and Ireland seeking agricultural land. Recognizing their tenuous claim to land they had cleared and now lived on, existing inhabitants began efforts to secure their investments given that many were not in financial situations to purchase it outright.

In the fall of 1842 a letter was sent to James Durand, then member of parliament for Canada West, by Queen's Bush inhabitants asking that parcels of land be divided into smaller, more affordable lots. The letter began with an acknowledgement of their "boldness of squatting into the Queens [sic] Bush the way we have," going on to explain that many arrived unable to support themselves or their families. As a result, a decision was made to go into the woods and cultivate unsettled land with the intention of buying it should the opportunity arise Citing their still poor financial situations and an inability to purchase land for cash the authors proposed that parcels of land be sized at 200 hundred acres so that there might be a chance for those already living there to purchase it.

The survey of Wellesley Township began in April 1843 under the direction of William Walker. By September of the same year 66,000 acres of land in the southern area of the Queen's Bush had been surveyed and mapped to aid in the selling of the land. Additional survey work was undertaken by Robert W. Kerr, surveying 74,627 acres of land that would become Peel Township in Wellington County.

As survey work progressed, the situation for those people already living on the land was further complicated. Surveys ignored the presence of existing structures so that multiple family farms were sometimes contained in one plot. A subsequent petition for assistance from government officials was sent to newly appointed Governor-General of the Province of Canada, Charles Metcalfe, asking that the land be granted to the existing inhabitants due to their unfavourable financial situations, who described themselves as:

"being extremely poor having lately emigrated from England, and from the Southern states were we have suffered all the horrors of Slavery, and having no means of purchasing land".

The request that was denied. The petition included 123 of which 51 were identified as Black settlers by historian Linda Brown-Kubisch.

Another petition was submitted to Earl of Elgin, then Governor General of Upper Canada, in 1847. Signed by 91 people, many of whom had signed the 1843 effort, the petition staked a claim to the land through a demonstrated allegiance to Queen Victoria and the squatters' role in making Queen's Bush land habitable and agriculturally productive. This time the petitioners had the added support of Hamilton's Black community, including Paolo Brown, Moses Crump and Peter Price who presented a petition objecting to what they viewed violations of property rights.

In 1850 Elgin offered a deal to black and white settlers squatting on land within the Queen's Bush, but the black settlers could not afford the payment terms. Many white settlers were able to remain on their land, and even appropriated the farmed lands of their now-displaced black neighbours. On January 1, 1850 the Queen's Bush was divided into counties, and the counties were divided into townships. Black settlers who lost their farms began a mass migration out of Queen's Bush to other African-Canadian communities.

== Legacy ==
An Ontario Historical Plaque located on Road 45 near where the Conestogo River crosses the road reads to following description;

In the early 19th century the vast unsettled area between Waterloo County and Lake Huron was known as the "Queen's Bush". More than 1,500 free and formerly enslaved Blacks pioneered scattered farms along the Peel and Wellesley Township border, with Glen Allan, Hawkesville and Wallenstein as important centres. Working together, these industrious and self-reliant settlers built churches, schools, and a strong and vibrant community life. American missionaries taught local Black children at the Mount Hope and Mount Pleasant schools. In the 1840s the government ordered the district surveyed and many of the settlers could not afford to purchase the land they had laboured so hard to clear. By 1850 migration out of the Queen's Bush had begun. Today African Canadians whose ancestors pioneered the Queen's Bush are represented in communities across Ontario.

Benjamin Drew was commissioned in the early 1850s by the Canadian Anti-Slavery Society to interview former enslaved people who settled in Canada. Some families from Wellesley were interviewed by Drew. He published the book, The Refugee, Narratives of Fugitive Slaves in Canada.

== See also ==
- List of Underground Railroad sites
