= Sunfish Lake (Ontario) =

Lake in Regional Municipality of Waterloo, Ontario, Canada

- Location within Ontario
- Location: Wilmot Township, Ontario
- Coordinates: 43.4741°N 80.6343°W
- Lake type: meromictic
- Basin countries: Canada
- Surface area: 25 ha (62 acres)
- Max. depth: 19 m (62 ft)
- Settlements: St. Agatha

Sunfish Lake Ontario

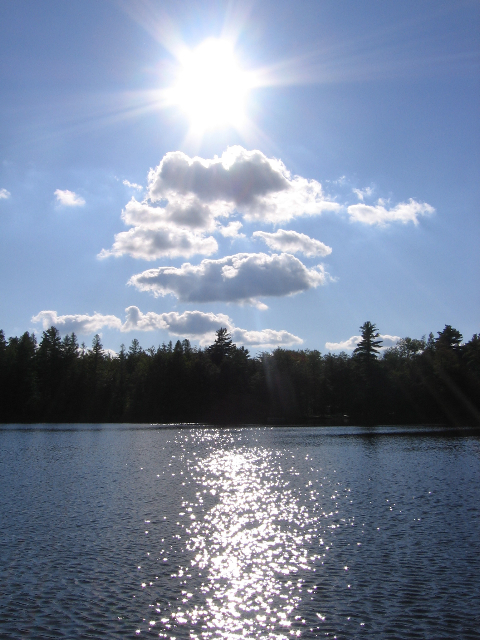
Sunfish Lake near Waterloo, Ontario.

Sunfish Lake is a small, 25 hectare meromictic lake located north-west of Waterloo, Ontario, in the village of St. Agatha in northern Wilmot Township, and is the source of Laurel Creek. It is one of a few meromictic lakes in Ontario, that is, its deep bottom waters (21 metres or 70 feet) are totally devoid of oxygen. The surface and bottom layers do not mix, and the lake is vulnerable to environmental damage.

Restrictions on lake use include no motorized boats, no fertilizer or pesticide use, and regular septic tank inspections.

Sunfish Lake is often compared to Paradise Lake which is about 3 km to the north-west, in Wellesley Township. Paradise Lake is a much larger lake and accommodates many more properties with the ability to live year-round.

There are about 20 cottages and homes on the lake, of which only a small handful are zoned for year-round residence, the rest are zoned recreational and are not used nor lanes cleared during the winter.

== Sunfish Lake Association ==
The Sunfish Lake Association was formed in 1961 by Edna Staebler and Jack Hutchison and is an incorporated, charitable group with a mandate of stewarding and protecting the Sunfish Lake area. The Sunfish Lake Association has been instrumental in engaging the media and the community in the Region of Waterloo's Environmentally Sensitive Lands initiative, which is similar to a local greenway.

Throughout the 1960s, the ecological health of the area improved and in 1978 the Association co-ordinated the creation of Sunfish Holdings, Inc. to purchase environmentally sensitive lands surrounding Sunfish Lake to guarantee future protection.

In the 1980s, an intensive program of harvesting chara to remove an abundance of nutrients in the lake was undertaken, along with limiting the lake to counteract the effects of acid rain. Stewardship efforts continued in the 1990s and 2000s with efforts to control purple loosestrife, a new forest management program and considerable efforts to protect a broader area around the lake with the Laurel Creek Headwaters Environmentally Sensitive Landscape greenbelt initiative.

The association members have also been supportive of Ontario Nature's greenway initiative, and regularly share their experiences with engaging landowners and the broader community. The group owns and stewards 50 acres (200,000 m^{2}) of woodland and wetland surrounding Sunfish Lake. They have undertaken tree planting projects, and have conducted a fish survey of Sunfish Lake.

== See also ==
- List of lakes in Ontario
