= Stephen J. R. Smith =

Canadian businessman

- Education: Queen's University
- Occupation: Businessman
- Known for: Executive chairman and co-Founder, First National Financial Corporation

Stephen J. R. Smith (2 June 1951, Ottawa) is a Canadian businessman who is the Executive chairman and co-founder of First National Financial Corporation. As of March 2026, his net worth was estimated as $7 billion.

== Personal life ==
Smith was born and raised in Ottawa, Ontario. He attended St. Patrick's College High School in Ottawa East. As a youth, his hobbies included ham radio operating and computer coding, which was an emerging field in the 1960s.

Smith graduated with a degree of Electrical Engineering from Queen's University in 1972. He was briefly a computer coder before deciding to enroll in graduate studies. He moved to the United Kingdom to pursue a Master of Science in Economics from the London School of Economics. He graduated in 1973.

== Business ==
Smith held various jobs at Hawker Siddeley Canada Inc., including assistant director of the aircraft manufacturer's corporate planning division. In 1980, Smith's outspoken manner got him fired from Hawker Siddeley. Smith started investing in real estate, flipping triplexes. This venture evolved to include the construction of homes. However, a dramatic rise in interest rates slowed the real estate market, and the business collapsed. In 1984, Smith declared personal bankruptcy.

In 1988, he co-founded First National Financial Corporation with Moray Tawse, a manager at Guaranty Trust. In First National's first year, 10 employees generated approximately $200,000. Smith and First National developed the software MERLIN, which assists in mortgage approval. It is one of the largest non-bank lender of mortgages in Canada. As of 2015, First National had over $90 billion of mortgage loans under administration.

Smith chairs and co-owns the Canada Guaranty Mortgage Insurance Company. He purchased the company from AIG in 2010. He is chair of Peloton Capital Management, which he formed in 2018 in partnership with two former executives from Ontario Teachers' Pension Plan. Smith chairs and co-owns Duo Bank of Canada (now Fairstone Bank of Canada), which he bought in April 2019. As of 2026, he is the largest shareholder in Equitable Bank. He is a member of the Business Council of Canada.

In March 2026 he bought a 26.9% stake in The Economist.

== Philanthropy ==
In 1997, he created the Stephen J.R. Smith Bursary, which rewards the leadership, involvement and creativity of electrical engineering and economics students.

In 2015, he gave $50 million to Queen's University at Kingston, after which Queen's business school was renamed to Smith School of Business. On 2 November 2023, he gifted $100 million to the faculty of engineering at Queen's. The university announced on that day a new name for the faculty: the Stephen J. R. Smith Faculty of Engineering and Applied Science.

Stephen Smith is an honorary governor of the Royal Ontario Museum and the longstanding board chair of Historica Canada, the country's largest organization devoted to teaching Canada's history and the values of citizenship. In 2014, a $3 million donation from Smith and his wife, Diane Blake, helped found the Myseum of Toronto (now Museum of Toronto). The interactive online museum explores the history of the city of Toronto.

Smith is a director of the independent, non-profit C. D. Howe Institute, an independent non-profit Canadian policy research organization. He is a former vice-chair of Metrolinx Inc., the Ontario crown agency that provides public transit in the Greater Toronto and Hamilton Areas.

== Honours ==
- Ontario Financial Services Entrepreneur of the Year, Ernst and Young (2007)
- Queen Elizabeth II Diamond Jubilee Medal, Government of Canada (2012)
- Companion, Canadian Business Hall of Fame (2019)
- The Fraser Institute Founders' Award (2025)
- Order of Ontario (2025)
