= Northern Finance Association =

- Abbreviation: NFA
- Founder: Giovanni Barone-Adesi; Vijay Jog; Lawrence Kryzanowski
- Type: Learned society
- Headquarters: Smith School of Business, 143 Union Street, Kingston, Ontario, Canada
- Board of directors: Murray Carlson; Francesca Carrieri; Claudia Champagne; Jan Ericsson; Louis Gagnon; Maria Pacurar; Andriy Shkilko; Tatyana Sokolyk
- Website: http://northernfinanceassociation.org/

The Northern Finance Association (NFA) is a learned society consisting of academic researchers in finance. It is federally incorporated as a not-for-profit organization in Canada. It hosts an annual conference in Autumn. The conferences are always in Canada, but participants come from around the world. Typically, one-third of the participants are from Canada, one-third from the United States and the final third from the rest of the world.
