= First National Financial Corporation =

Canadian financial services company

- Type: Private
- Industry: Credit Mortgage lending
- Founded: 1988; 38 years ago
- Founders: Stephen Smith & Moray Tawse
- Headquarters: Toronto, Canada
- Key people: Stephen Smith, Co-Founder & Chairman Emeritus Moray Tawse, Executive Chairman, Senior Vice President & Co-Founder Rob Inglis, Chief Financial Officer
- Revenue: $2.4 billion (2025)
- Net income: $126.9 million (2025)
- AUM: $166.2 billion (2025)
- Subsidiaries: First National Financial LP
- Website: www.firstnational.ca

First National Financial Corporation (First National) is a Canadian financial services company that is the parent company of First National Financial LP, a private lending institution based in Toronto, Ontario. First National is among the top three in market share in the mortgage broker distribution channel.

First National is based in Toronto with over 1,600 employees and five regional offices throughout Canada, including in Calgary, Vancouver, Halifax, and Montreal.

== History ==
=== Foundation and expansion ===
In 1988, Stephen J.R. Smith and Moray Tawse opened First National for business with its first office located in Toronto.

In 1991, First National expanded its company to Western Canada and opened a second office in Vancouver. In 1995, First National opened its Halifax office. As the company continued to expand, First National opened another office in Calgary in 2000 and in Montreal in 2008.

=== Becoming CMHC-approved ===
In 1991, First National became a CMHC-approved lender in Canada, allowing them to lend directly to borrowers.

In 2001, First National launched Merlin, an online mortgage approval and tracking software system. In 2003, the system expanded to include commercial mortgage administration and investor communications. In 2007, First National introduced My Mortgage, an online mortgage management tool.

In 2006, First National became the first Canadian lender to offer the Canada Mortgage and Housing Corporation (CMHC) insured Interest Only Mortgage, meant to help qualified home buyers to lower their monthly mortgage payments in addition to help their month-to-month cash flow. The Interest Only Mortgage offers the option of paying only interest for the first five or ten years of a mortgage.

On July 16, 2014, First National Financial Corporation announced that its subsidiary First National Financial LP will supplement the Toronto-Dominion Bank with underwriting and fulfillment processing services on mortgages originated through the Toronto-Dominion Bank's residential mortgage broker channel.

=== 2006 to 2024 - Growth ===
In 2006, First National had over $20 billion in mortgages under administration. The following year in 2007, First National had $31.2 billion mortgages under administration, a 37 percent increase from 2006. The increase was mainly due to First National's growing market share in single-family residential mortgages and commercial mortgages. In 2016, First National’s second quarter had a record high of $90.1 billion mortgages under administration. By the end of that year, First National had a total of $99.4 billion in mortgages under administration. In October 2017, First National Financial Corporation announced it had reached $100 billion in mortgages under administration.

On October 1, 2015, Queen's University’s School of Business changed its name to the Stephen J.R. Smith School of Business in honour of the $50 million donation made by Stephen Smith, Chairman, CEO and Co-founder of First National Financial Corporation.

Effective October 30, 2018, Jason Ellis fulfilled the role of Chief Operating Officer of First National Financial LP. This appointment came as the company continues to grow. Jason Ellis has been with First National since 2004, overseeing the Treasury and Capital Markets department and helped managed the company's relationships with investors.

On June 19, 2019, the chairman and CEO of First National Financial LP, Stephen Smith, was inducted into the Canadian Business Hall of Fame.

In January 2022. First National Financial Corporation announced the appointments of Stephen Smith as executive chairman of the board and Jason Ellis as president, chief executive officer, and director.

As part of Bank of Montreal’s announced re-entry to the broker channel starting in early 2024, the bank confirmed it would be partnering with First National to provide its underwriting and funding services.

In March 2024, First National Financial Corporation hit a landmark achievement by surpassing $50 billion in commercial mortgages under administration (MUA).

=== 2025 ===
On July 27, 2025, First National announced that Brookfield Asset Management Ltd. and Birch Hill Equity Partners Management Inc. are jointly acquiring a 62-per-cent stake in First National.

On October 22, 2025, First National Financial Corp. completed its $2.9-billion privatization deal, marking a major ownership shift for one of Canada’s largest non-bank mortgage lenders.

=== 2026 ===
On March 12, 2026, First National announced the retirement of Jason Ellis, President & CEO.

On September 15, 2026, First National named Hassan Pirnia, as the new President & CEO effective November 2, 2026.

== Holdings ==
In 2017, First National administered $101.6 billion in mortgages, a 2% increase over 2017. 81% of its mortgages are insured by the Canadian Mortgage and Housing Corporation; 13% are conventional single family residential homes; and 6% are multi-unit residences and commercial spaces.

In 2018, First National's revenue grew 10% to $1.2 billion, with $106.2 billion in mortgages under administration.

In 2020, First National had $118.7 billion mortgages under administration and $1.38 billion in revenue.

In 2021, First National's mortgages under administration grew to $123.9 billion.

In 2022, First National's Mortgages under administration totaled a record high of $131 billion in 2022

In 2024, First National's mortgages under administration increase by 7% to $153.7 billion.

== Credit agency ratings ==
2023 DBRS Ratings
Servicing Category	Rating
Primary Residential Mortgage Servicing	Good
Special Residential Mortgage Servicing	Good

2023 FITCH Ratings
Servicing Category	Rating
Commercial Primary Servicer	CPS2-
Commercial Master Servicer	CMS3+
Commercial Loan-Level Special Servicer	CLLSS3+

2017 DBRS Ratings
Servicing Category	Rating
Primary Commercial Mortgage Servicing	Adequate
Master Commercial Mortgage Servicing	Adequate
Special Commercial Mortgage Servicing	Adequate
