= Paradise Lake (Ontario) =

- Location within Ontario
- Location: Wellesley, Regional Municipality of Waterloo, Ontario, Canada
- Coordinates: 43.499°N 80.657°W
- Type: lake

Paradise Lake Ontario

Paradise Lake is a lake in Ontario. This small lake is in the Township of Wellesley, Ontario in the Regional Municipality of Waterloo in Ontario, Canada. It is due south of the large village of St. Clements and near the village of Bamberg.

== Cottages and summer camp ==
The lake is surrounded by cottages on private land; there is no public access to the water nor a public beach. Early settlers in the Bamberg area were from Germany and the village was initially named Weimar; it was changed to Bamberg in 1852. The nearest city is Waterloo, Ontario.

A residential summer camp for children has been located on this lake since 1924, currently the Camp Ki-Wa-Y, so-named in 1942. The 77 acres of land and the buildings were owned by the Kiwanis Club of Kitchener-Waterloo but the camp was donated to the Kitchener-Waterloo YMCA in the 2009. Thanks to an agreement with the Kiwanis Club, the Y had already used the site as a camp for some years (since at least 1975), sometimes in conjunction with some Roman Catholic groups, and has held year-round programming for school groups here since 1995 as the YMCA Outdoor Education Centre; the association also uses the site for conferences, retreats, meetings and family reunions.
