= Mary Ann Turcke =

Canadian media executive

- Born: Kingston, Ontario, Canada
- Education: B.S., civil engineering, Queen's University (1988); M.S. engineering, University of Toronto (1990); MBA, Queen's School of Business (1997)
- Employer: National Football League
- Spouse: Gordon McIlquham
- Children: 2
- Parent(s): David John Turcke; Ann Cosgrove Zarichny

Mary Ann Turcke is a Canadian media executive. She worked as a civil engineer, consultant, and IT operations manager before joining BCE in 2005. There, she had assumed various management roles, including president of Bell Media from 2014 to 2017. In 2017, she was hired by the National Football League to lead its digital media division, and was promoted to chief operating officer of the NFL the following year.

She was named to the Top 100 list of Canada's Most Powerful Women by the Women's Executive Network (WXN) in 2009, 2010, 2012, and 2013, and was inducted into the WXN Hall of Fame in 2013.

== Early life and education ==
Mary Ann Turcke was born and grew up in Kingston, Ontario, Canada, the daughter of David John Turcke, a professor of engineering at Queen's University, and Ann Cosgrove Zarichny. She has a brother and sister, Erin and Robert.

She pursued her bachelor's degree in civil engineering at Queen's University, graduating in 1988. In 1990 she earned her master's degree in engineering at the University of Toronto. In 1996 she enrolled in the first Master of Business Administration program at the Smith School of Business, receiving her MBA in 1997.

== Career ==
Turcke began her career as a civil engineer and project manager for the Ministry of Transportation of Ontario, designing and building highways and bridges.

After earning her MBA, she moved to A. T. Kearney Management Consultants, primarily as a consultant to railroad clients. In 1999 she moved to the IT sector, serving as vice president of operations and Canada general manager for Internet Pictures Corporation of Palo Alto, California, until 2001. From 2002 to 2005 she was a partner and board director at Codesta LLC.

In 2005, she joined Bell Canada as its Vice President of Customer Experience and Operations for Small Medium Businesses. overseeing a team of 1,000 employees. In 2008, she was promoted to Executive Vice President of Field Operations. In November 2014, she became Bell Media's president of media sales, before becoming the head of the division in April 2015 to replace the outgoing Kevin Crull.

Shortly after assuming her position, Turcke was criticized for remarks she made that classified the use of virtual private networks to evade geo-blocking and access the U.S. version of subscription-video-on-demand service Netflix as "stealing". As president, she led a major re-structuring of the company's executive staff in August 2015, in an effort to reduce its expenses.

On February 28, 2017, it was announced that Turcke would be stepping down from her position at Bell, and would be joining the National Football League as the President of NFL Media, overseeing NFL Network and the league's digital media platforms. On March 13, 2018, she was promoted to chief operating officer of the NFL, replacing the outgoing Tod Leiweke. Roger Goodell praised her performance as media head, citing the success of NFL Network since her arrival. Unlike Leiweke, football operations will not report to Turcke.

Turke left the NFL in 2020 to join the Infrastructure Partners L.P. as a Senior Advisor.

In February 2023, Turcke was appointed to the board of Skyworks Solutions.

== Other activities ==
Turcke chairs the boards of Bell Technical Solutions and Expertech Corporation. In 2012, she was named to the board of Maple Leaf Sports & Entertainment. She is also a member of the advisory boards of the Smith School of Business, the capital campaign for the Queen's Faculty of Engineering and Applied Science(Smith Engineering) since 2019, and Sheena's Place, an organization for people with eating disorders. In 2016, Turcke joined the board of SickKids. She previously served on the boards of the Professional Engineers of Ontario (1993 to 1995), the Kingston Yacht Club (1996), CIBC Run for the Cure (2002), and the Tarragon Theatre (2006 to 2008).

== Honors ==
Turcke was named to the Women's Executive Network's list of Canada's Most Powerful Women: Top 100 in 2009, 2010, 2012, and 2013. In 2013, she was inducted into the WXN Hall of Fame.

In February 2015 Turcke was named Woman of the Year by Women in Communications and Technology. Also in 2015, she was named one of the Top 25 Women of Influence by the Women of Influence organization.

== Personal life ==
Turcke is married to Gordon McIlquham, also a native of Kingston, Ontario. McIlquham represented Canada in sailing at the 1988 Summer Olympics, competing in the men's two-person dinghy (470) class with Nigel Cochrane; the team placed 8th. Turcke, McIlquham, and their two daughters are all sailing enthusiasts and race on the same team out of the Royal Canadian Yacht Club.
