= Melvin Goodes =

Canadian businessman

Melvin "Mel" Russell Goodes was a Canadian businessman. Goodes was born April 11, 1935, in Hamilton, Ontario, Canada. His father, Cedric, was an assistant accountant, then a budget analyst, in the finance department of the City of Hamilton. His mother, Mary, was active with such groups as the Churchill Field Lawn Bowling Club. Goodes attended Westdale Secondary School, where he was a star athlete at Westdale, nicknamed “Sugarfoot” for his basketball ability.

He graduated from Queen's University at Kingston, receiving his Bachelor of Commerce in 1957. In later years he was an active member of the board of trustees and a benefactor of the university. In 2009, he was diagnosed with Alzheimer’s disease. He and his wife, Nancy founded the Melvin R. Goodes Prize for Excellence in Drug Development. Described as the Nobel Prize for Alzheimer’s, it provides $150,000 annually to a researcher. Goodes made a large donation toward the construction of a new home for the Queen's School of Business, which is named Goodes Hall in honor of his parents, Mary and Cedric Goodes. He holds an MBA from the University of Chicago Graduate School of Business.

Goodes was the chief operating officer and president of Warner-Lambert Company from 1985 to 1991. He retired from his position as chairman and CEO of Warner-Lambert in 1999. During his tenure, he received the Drucker award for his "dramatic turnaround of the global pharmaceutical and consumer products company".

In 1994 Goodes became a director of Ameritech Corporation and was a member of the finance committee, the executive committee and the chairman for the nominating committee. In 1987, Goodes was a director for Unisys Corporation and a member of its corporate governance and compensation committee until he retired in February 2004. Goodes died on September 30, 2024.
