= St. Clements, Ontario =

St. Clements
- Unincorporated community
- Lobsinger Line in St. Clements

- Location within Regional Municipality of Waterloo Location within Southern Ontario
- Coordinates: 43°31′27″N 80°39′6″W
- Country: Canada
- Province: Ontario
- Regional municipality: Waterloo
- Township: Wellesley
- Time zone: UTC-5 (EST)
  - Summer (DST): UTC-4 (EDT)
- Forward sortation area: N0B 2M0
- Area codes: 519 and 226
- GNBC Code: FECFA

St. Clements is an unincorporated community in the township of Wellesley, Region of Waterloo, Ontario, Canada. It was formerly recognized as a designated place by Statistics Canada.

== History ==
St. Clements was originally part of the King's Bush and settled by German Catholics from Alsace–Lorraine.

The village of St. Clements was settled in 1840, by Michael Spiehlmacker. The village's post office was established in 1853, and its postmaster, John Stroh, also ran the village's tavern and served as justice of the peace. By 1864, there was a large Roman Catholic church, two stores, three hotels and some tradesmen, although the population was only about 100. By 1869, the population had increased to 200 and the post office was receiving mail daily.

=== Church ===
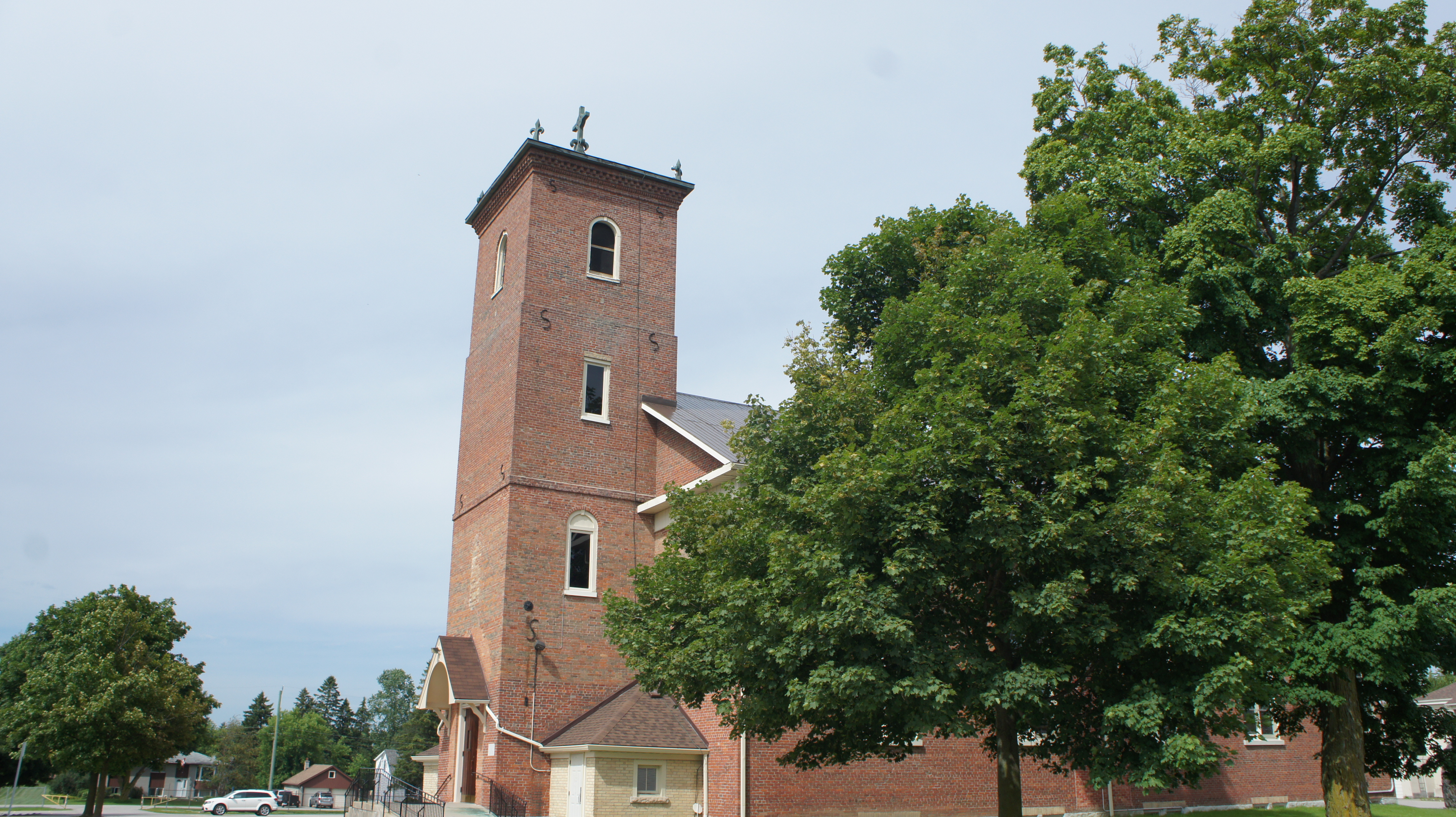
St. Clement Roman Catholic Church, St. Clements

Of note in St. Clements is the St. Clement Roman Catholic Church. The first church, a log church, was built in 1840 and was served from St. Agatha mission in St. Agatha, Ontario. In 1844, a Redemptorist priest was assigned to the mission and named the log church St. Alphonsus, the founder of his religious order. The church was then placed under the care of the Jesuits in 1847 who then established the parish register. In 1852, Bishop Michael Power ordered the church should be named after St. Clement. The parish received its first pastor, Rev. Messner, a Capuchin from Tyrol in 1852 and a year later, the log church was deemed too small. In 1858, a large brick church (80 ft (24 m) x 120 ft (37 m)), was completed. A brass band from Buffalo, New York gave a concert before the church dedication. At the time of its opening, it was said to be the largest and finest church west of Toronto.

== Demographics ==
In the 2021 Census of Population conducted by Statistics Canada, St. Clements had a population of 1240 living in 456 of its 463 total private dwellings, a change of 51.2% from its 2016 population of 820. With a land area of 1.51 km^{2} (0.58 sq mi), it had a population density of 821.2/km^{2} (2,126.9/sq mi) in 2021.

== Notable people ==
- Michael Latta, ice hockey player.

== See also ==
- List of communities in Ontario
- List of designated places in Ontario
