= Sunfish Lake (Minnesota) =

Lake in the state of Minnesota, United States

- Location within Minnesota
- Location: Dakota County, Minnesota
- Coordinates: 44°52′33″N 93°5′52″W
- Type: lake

Sunfish Lake is a lake in Dakota County, in the U.S. state of Minnesota.

Sunfish Lake was named for the sunfish native to its waters.

== See also ==
- List of lakes in Minnesota
