= Maxine Noel =

Canadian First Nations artist

Maxine Noel CM
- Ioyan Mani
- Born: 1946 (age 78–79); Birdtail Sioux First Nation, Manitoba

Maxine Noel CM (born 1946) is a Canadian First Nations artist from the Santee and Oglala heritage. She was given the Sioux name Ioyan Mani ("walk beyond").

== Biography ==
She was born on the Birdtail Reserve in southwestern Manitoba. A self-taught artist, she first worked as a legal secretary in Edmonton and Toronto before becoming a full-time artist in 1979. Her work has been exhibited in museums and galleries across Canada. She works with serigraphy, lithography, etching, painting and cast paper.

Noel is also involved with Native Earth Performing Arts, the Canadian Native Arts Foundation and the Association for Native Development in the Performing and Visual Arts. She has lectured and served on panels at the Saskatchewan School of Fine Arts, the University of Western Ontario and the native program at the Ontario College of Art.

Her work is included in the collections of the Canadian Museum of History, the University of Western Ontario, the Canadian Native Arts Foundation in Toronto and the Whetung Ojibwa Centre.

Noel's work, "Not Forgotten," was made to honor and remember the missing and murdered indigenous women, and she donated royalties to the Native Women's Association of Canada. "Not Forgotten" was used in a 2019 campaign along British Columbia's Highway of Tears by the group, Artists Against Racism, in response to the final report for the inquiry missing and murdered indigenous girls and women along Highway 16.

In 2018, she was named to the Order of Canada.
