= Wellesley, Ontario =

Wellesley
- Township (lower-tier)
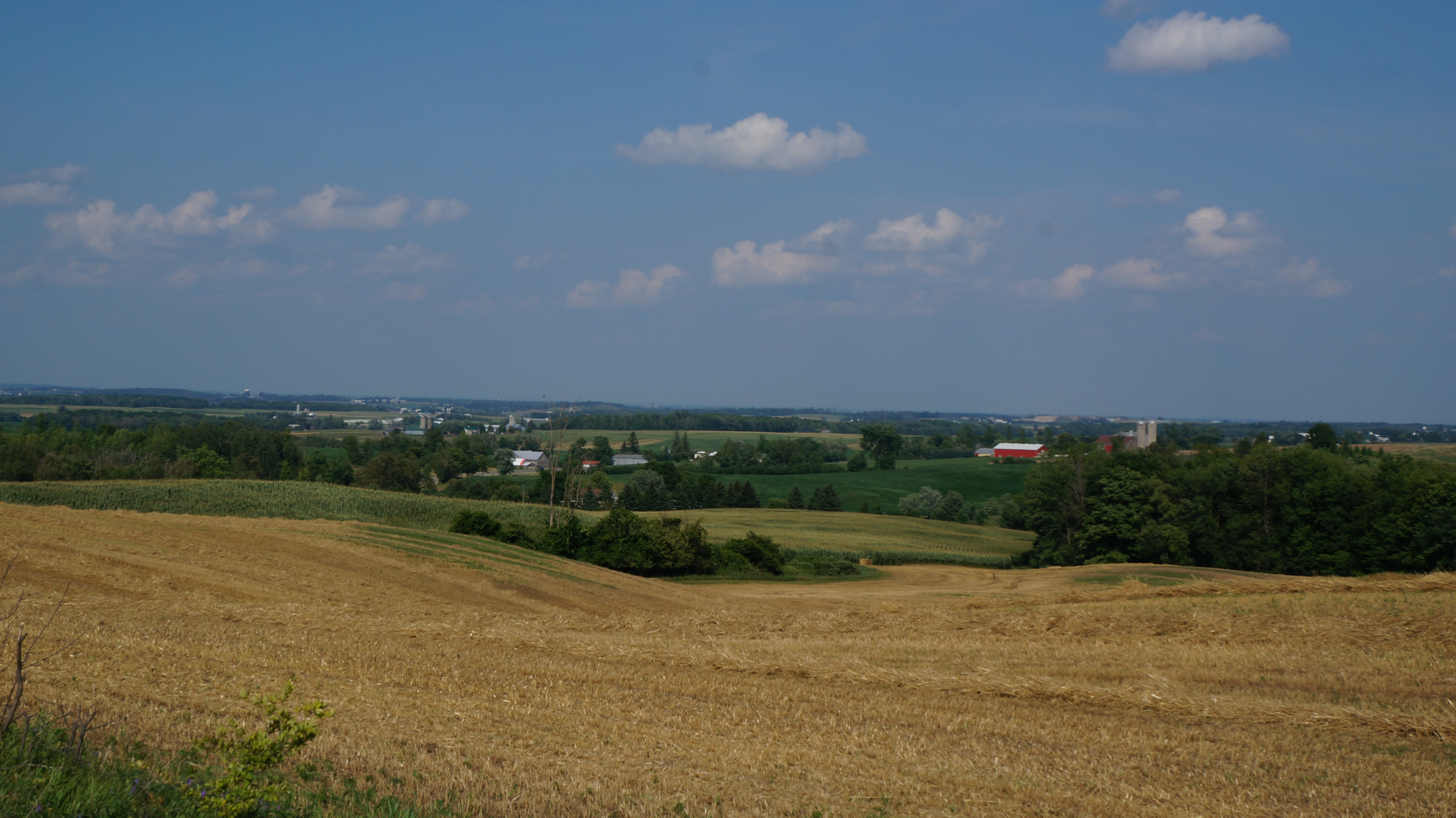
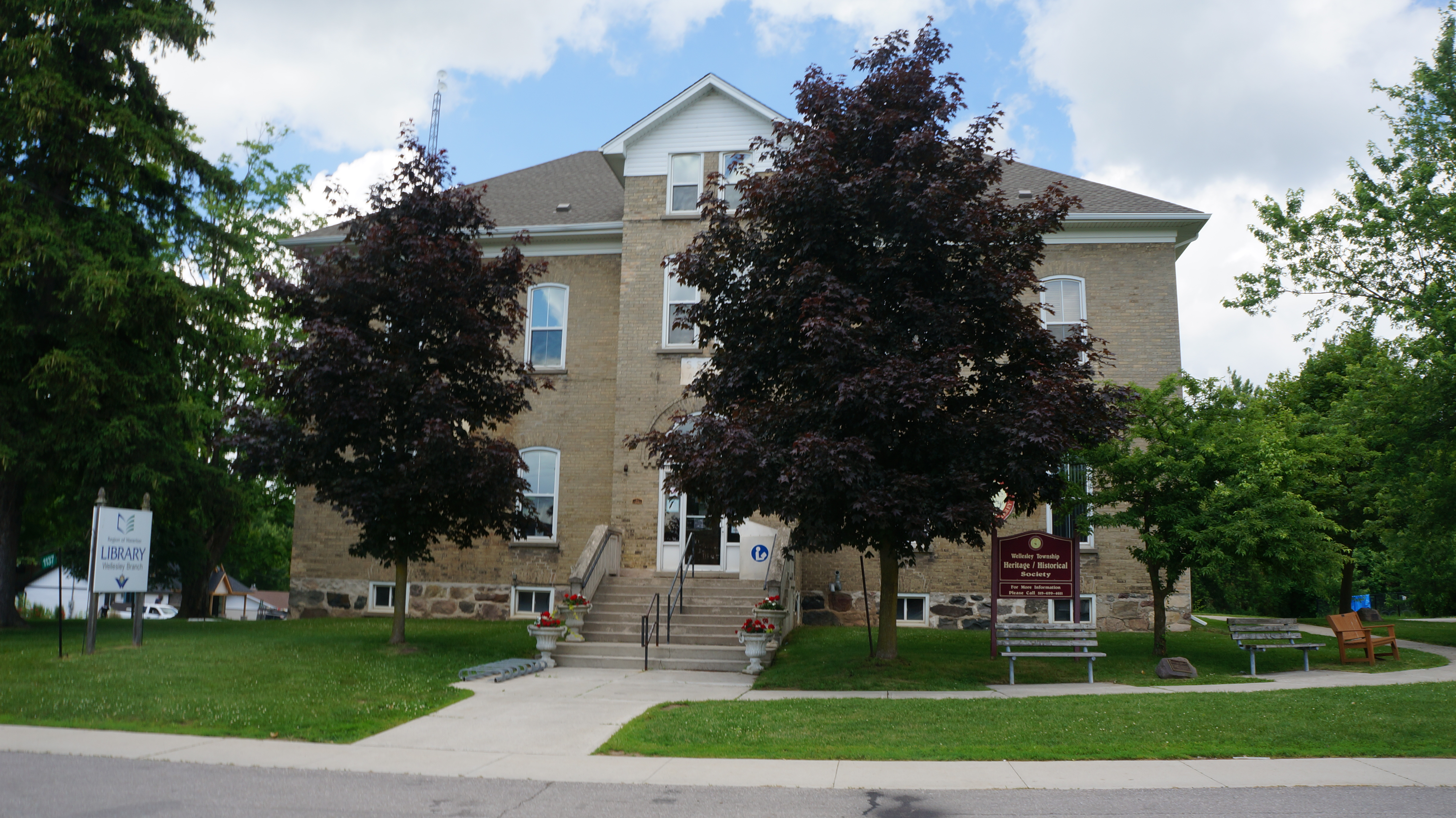
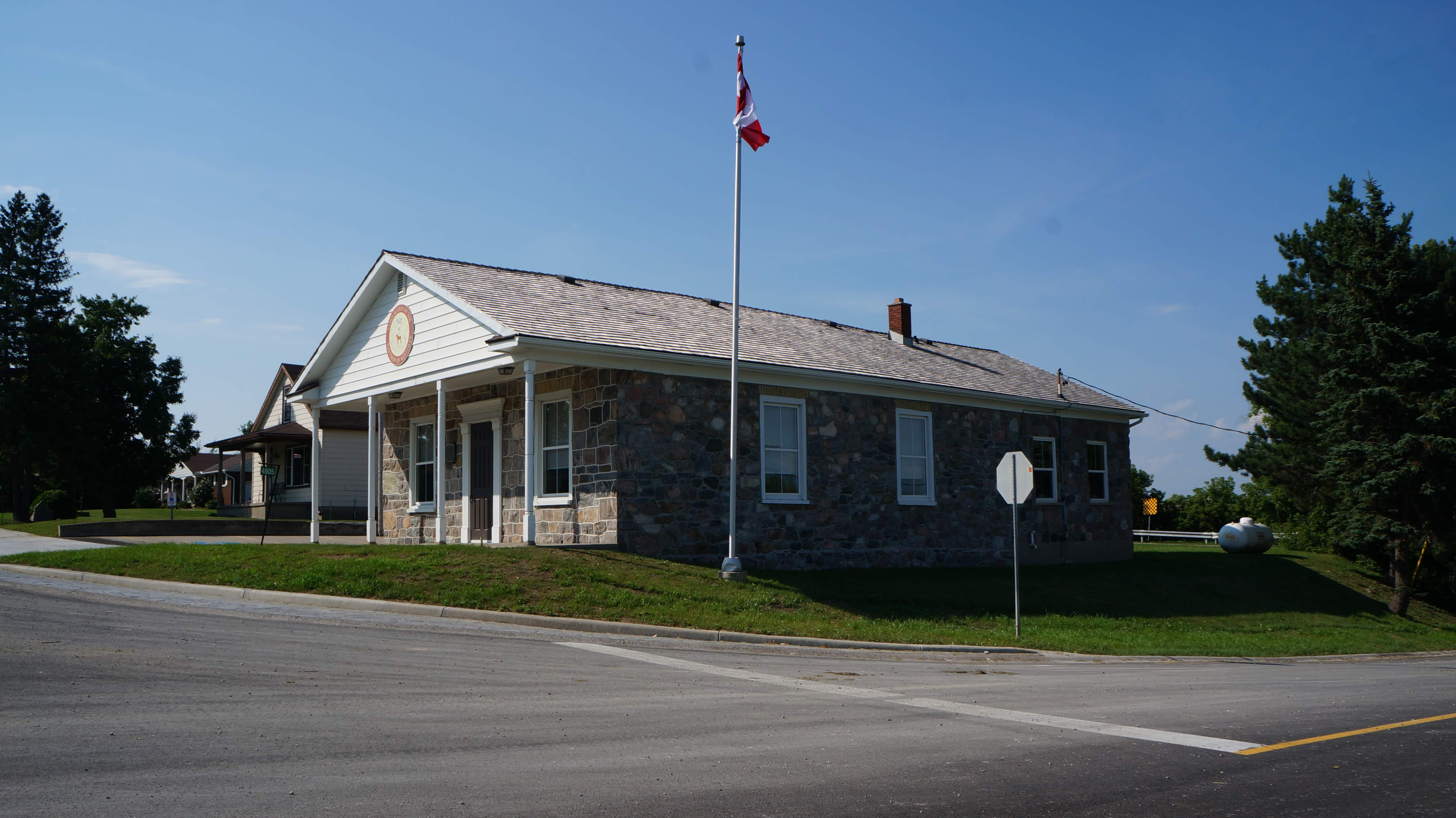
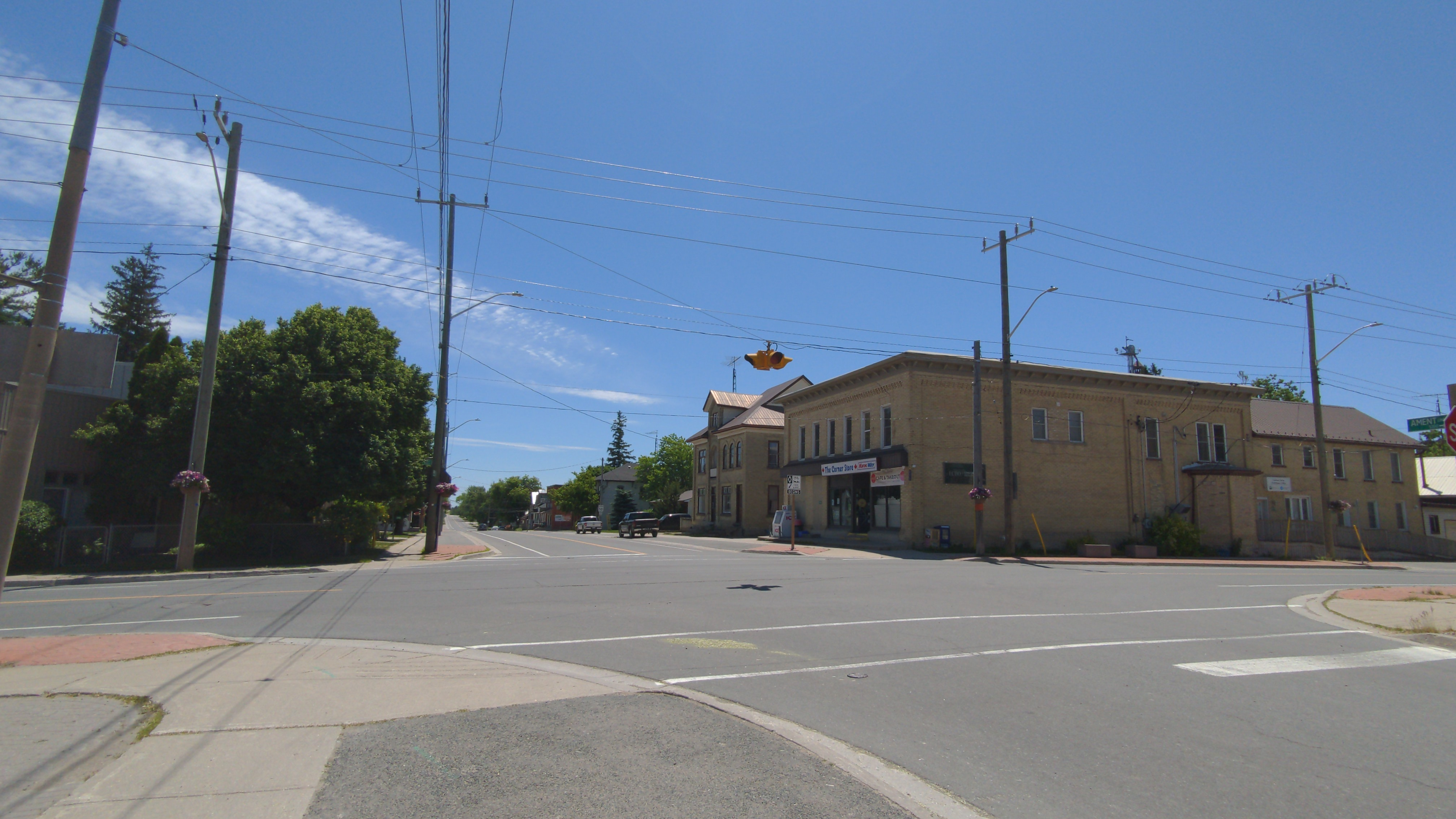
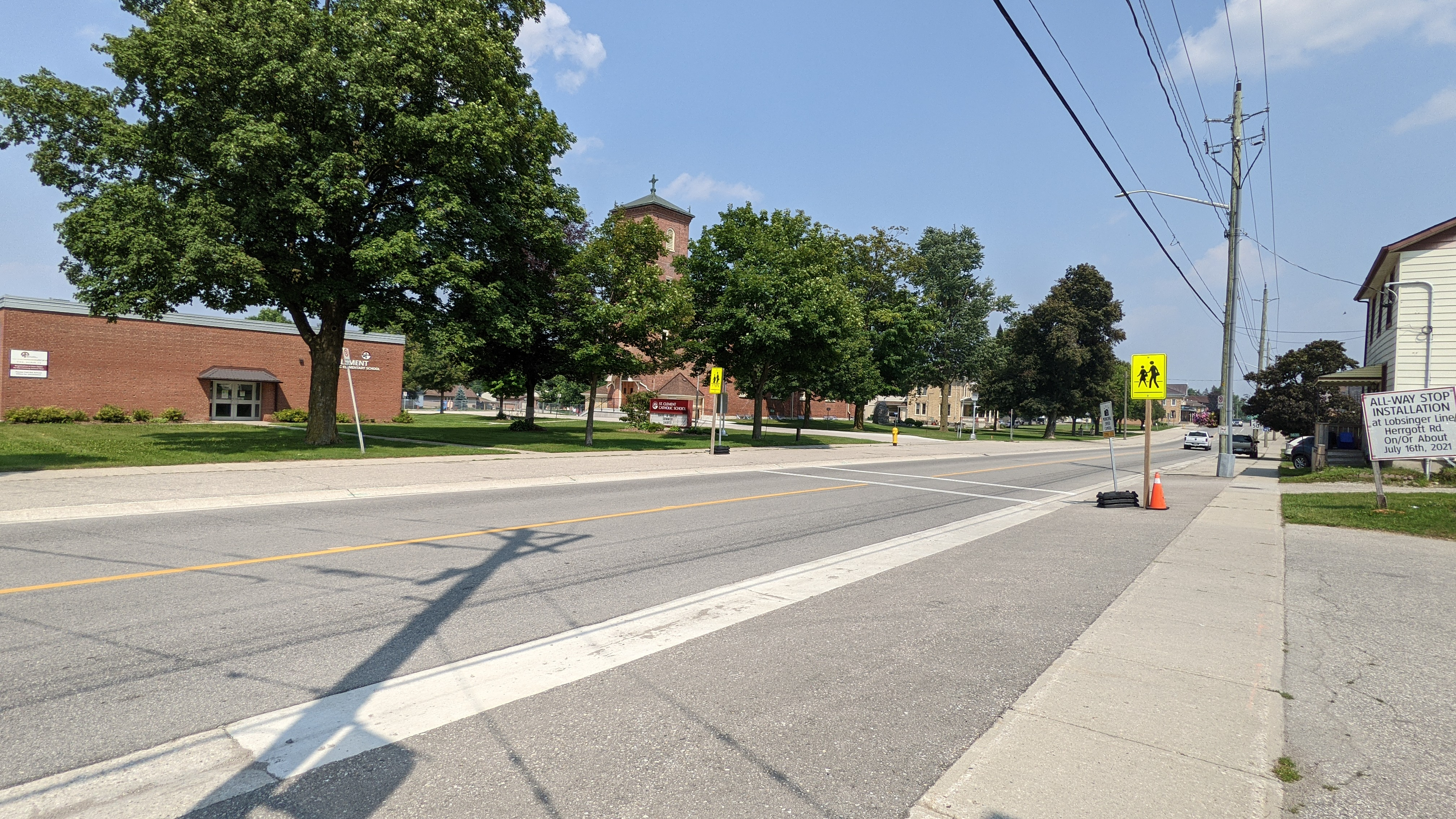
- Skyline from Hackbart Road Wellesley Library Township of Wellesley Council Chambers Linwood St. Clements

- Location within Regional Municipality of Waterloo Location within Southern Ontario
- Coordinates: 43°33′N 80°43′W
- Country: Canada
- Province: Ontario
- Region: Waterloo
- Settled: 1840s
- Incorporated: 1852
- Corporated: 2006

Government
  - Type: Township
  - Mayor: Joe Nowak
  - Councillors: List: Shelley Wagner; Herb Neher; Peter van der Maas; Carl Smit
  - Governing Body: Wellesley Township Council
  - MP: Tim Louis (Liberal Party of Canada
  - MPP: Mike Harris Jr. (PCPO)

Area
  - Land: 277.76 km^{2} (107.24 sq mi)

Population (2016)
  - Total: 11,260
  - Density: 40.5/km^{2} (105/sq mi)
- Time zone: UTC−05:00 (EST)
  - Summer (DST): UTC−06:00 (EDT)
- Postal Code FSA: N0B 2M1
- Area codes: 519, 226, 548
- Website: www.wellesley.ca

Wellesley is the rural, north-western township of the Regional Municipality of Waterloo in Ontario, Canada. It encompasses 277.79 km^{2} (107.26 sq mi) and had a population of 11,260 in the Canada 2016 Census.

== History ==
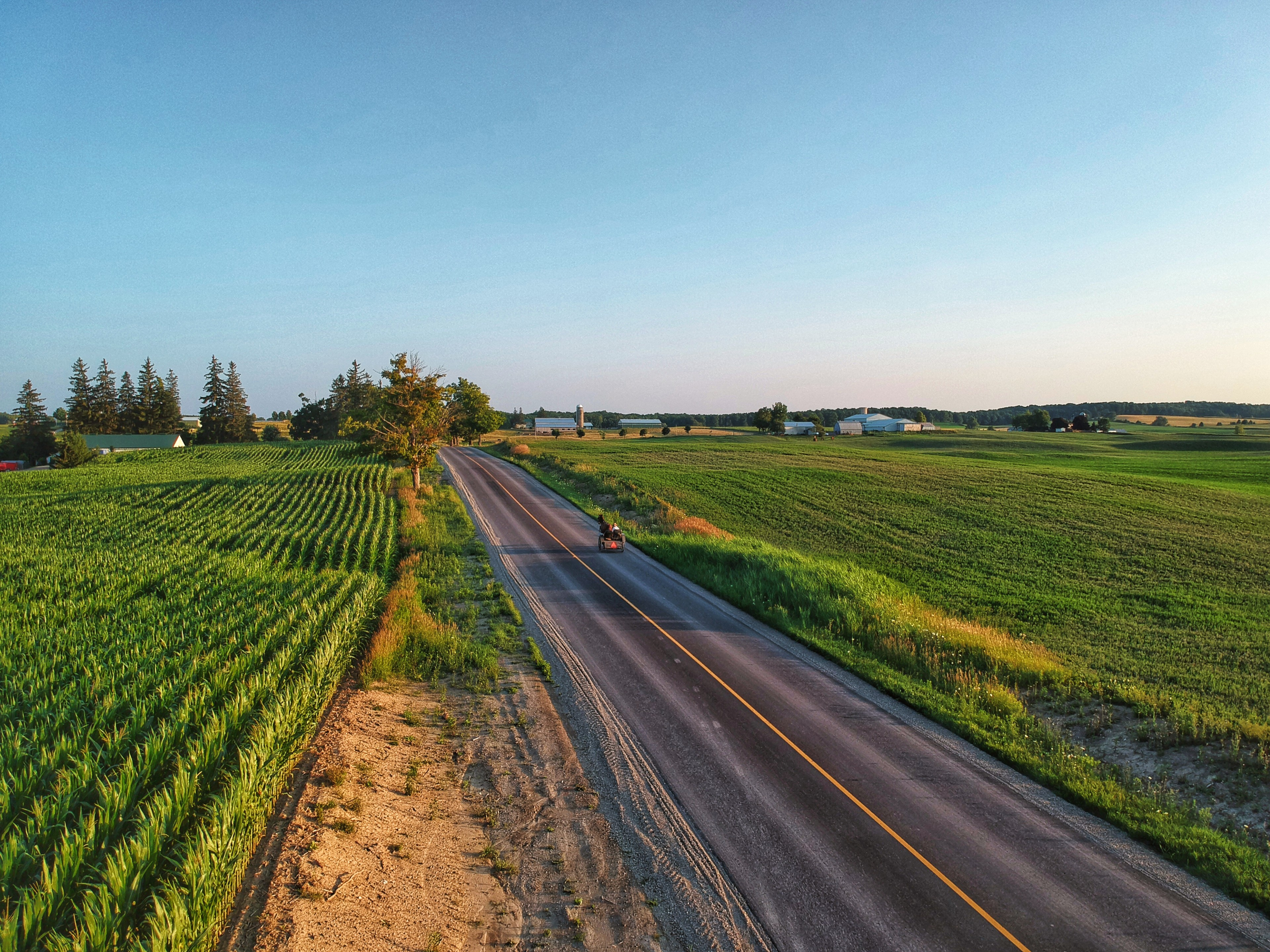
A local drives his buggy on Moser Young

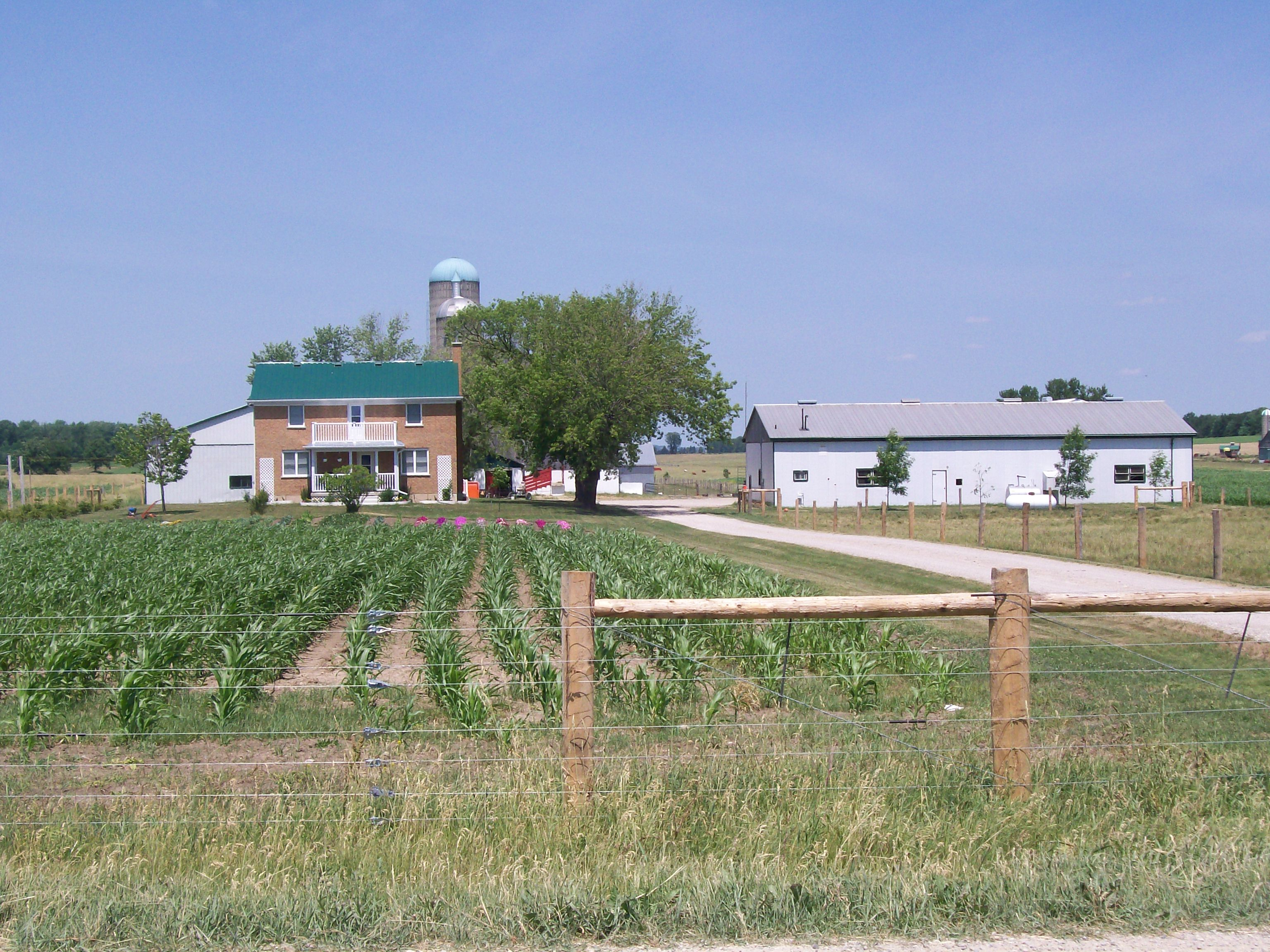
Typical Mennonite farm near Linwood

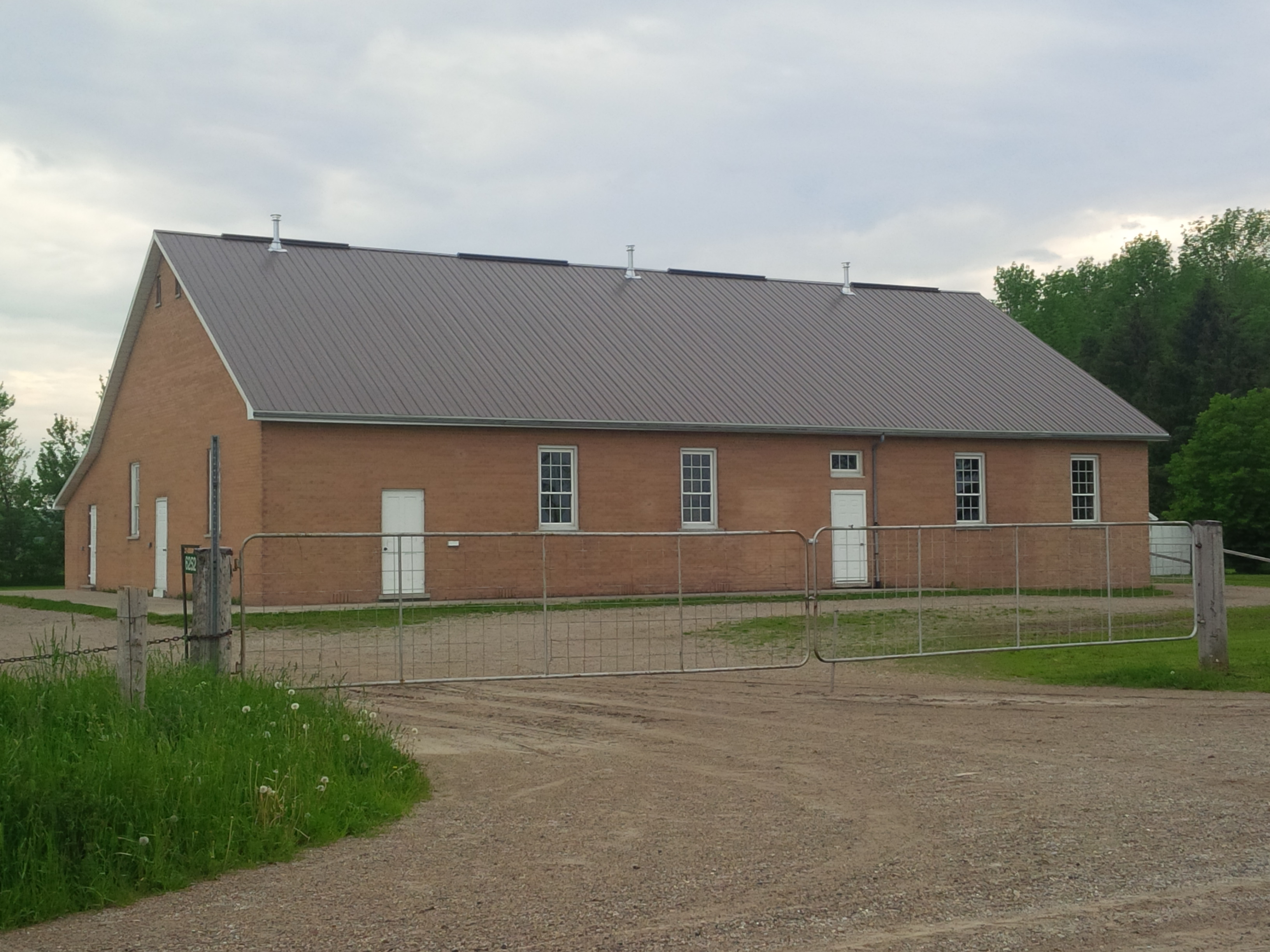
Typical Mennonite meeting house near Linwood

By 1805, many Mennonites from Pennsylvania had settled nearby in Berlin but Wellesley Township itself was not surveyed until 1842–43, due to being part of the Queen's Bush a region with a large Black settler population.

In 1837, John Philip Schweitzer from Germany squatted at what is now Hawkesville, and had 40 acres (160,000 m^{2}) of land cleared over the following nine years. Then, John Hawke received government permission to buy the clearing for $700.00 on the condition that he build a grist mill (for flour) and a sawmill within two years.

The village of St. Clements was settled in 1840, by Michael Spiehlmacker. A post office opened in 1853. By 1864, there was a large Roman Catholic church, two stores, three hotels and some tradesmen, although the population was only about 100. By 1869, the population had increased to 200 and the post office was receiving mail daily.

Records from 1846 about the entire Township indicate that much of the land had been "Queen's Rush, crown land, where fifty acre lots were given away to actual settlers". The Population of the entire township in 1841, was only 254.

The area now the village of Wellesley on the Nith River was first settled in 1847, by John Smith and was originally called Schmidtsville. The post office opened in 1851 and the village was renamed Wellesley after Richard Wellesley, 1st Marquess Wellesley, the eldest brother of Arthur Wellesley, 1st Duke of Wellington. The community quickly grew to be the largest economic centre in rural Waterloo County, with a wood mill, feed mill, a grain mill (which still stands after being constructed in 1856), leather tanner, cheese factory, restaurants and housing, and many other businesses that also brought much trade to the town from the nearby farms and farming villages. By 1864, the village also had two stores, a flour mill, three wagon makers, boot and shoe shops, a hotel two churches and a school with 78 students. By 1869, the population of the village of Wellesley was 400; the nearest rail station was 9 mi (14 km) away in Baden.

The village of Heidelberg was settled in the 1840s and had a post office by 1855, receiving mail three times a week. By 1864, it contained two stores, two hotels, a Lutheran church, and a school; the population was about 250. The township had three Roman Catholic Separate schools. In 1869, the village of Bamberg had a population of 200; it was on the stagecoach line to St. Agatha.

When the Waterloo County boundaries were established in 1852 to include the townships of Waterloo, Wellesley, Wilmot, Woolwich, and North Dumfries, John Hawke was named the first reeve of Wellesley and the first township hall was built in Hawkesville. When the decision was being made for the location of a county seat, Hawkesville originally anticipated being chosen over Berlin and Galt. However, John Hawke had the deciding vote, and he cast it in favour of Berlin. With the railway and the county seat, Berlin began to grow rapidly and kept on growing; Hawkesville flourished only until the end of the century before diminishing.

At the end of the 1900s, the area was home to doctors, blacksmiths, and merchants, as well as a tannery, hotels, and churches. Into the early 1900s, the village carriage and wagon maker, George Diefenbacker (his preferred spelling) would entertain his grandson, John Diefenbaker, each summer.

The first library in Wellesley Village was incorporated in 1900, and except for the period between 1916 and 1921, there has been continuous public library service ever since. The current branch, now part of the Region of Waterloo Library system, is located in the former S.S. No. 16 Wellesley Township public school building. The school closed its doors in 1967. The building gradually came back to life as the library was placed in the left classroom on the main floor in July 1970.

A residential summer camp for children has been located on Paradise Lake, located near Bamberg, since 1924; Camp Ki-WaY was owned by the Kiwanis Club until 2009 when it was donated to the YMCA. The early settlers of Bamberg were from Germany and the village was initially named Weimar; it was changed to Bamberg in 1852. The first settlers were squatters, including the Moser and Kroetsch families. By 1904, Bamberg, had two general stores, various businesses, a brewery, and post office.

== Geography ==
Paradise Lake is surrounded by cottages on private land; there is no public access to the water nor a public beach.

=== Communities ===
The township of Wellesley comprises the communities of Bamberg, Crosshill, Dorking, Hawkesville, Kingwood, Linwood, St. Clements, and Wellesley. The population was 576 in 2016.

== Demographics ==
Wellesley, Ontario Historical populations
Year	Pop.	±%
1991	8,234	—
1996	8,664	+5.2%
2001	9,365	+8.1%
2006	9,789	+4.5%
2011	10,713	+9.4%
2016	11,260	+5.1%
2021	11,318	+0.5%

In the 2021 Census of Population conducted by Statistics Canada, Wellesley had a population of 11,318 living in 3,366 of its 3,444 total private dwellings, a change of 0.5% from its 2016 population of 11,260. With a land area of 277.74 km^{2} (107.24 sq mi), it had a population density of 40.8/km^{2} (105.5/sq mi) in 2021.

== Economy ==
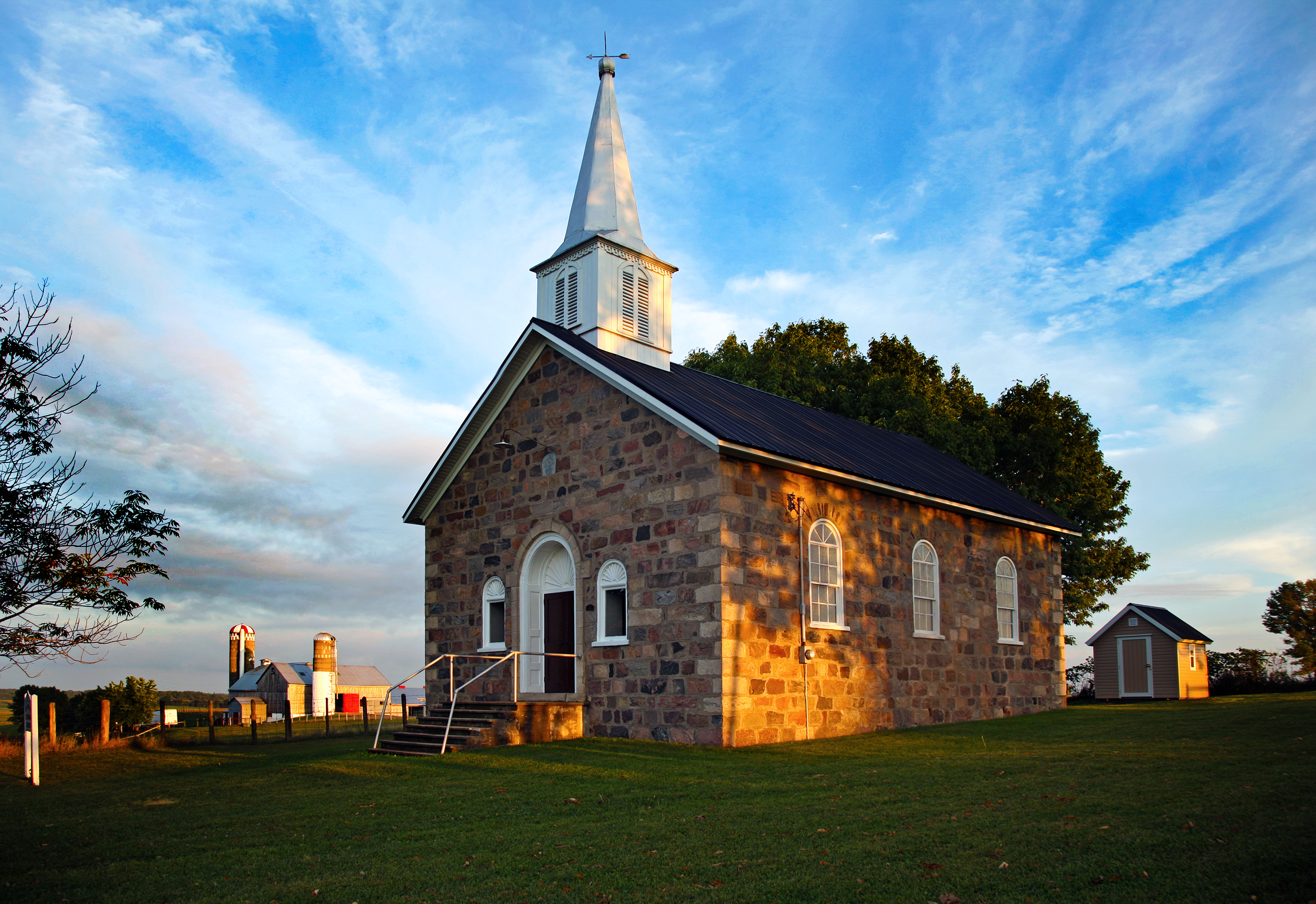
St. John's Lutheran Church, Wellesley

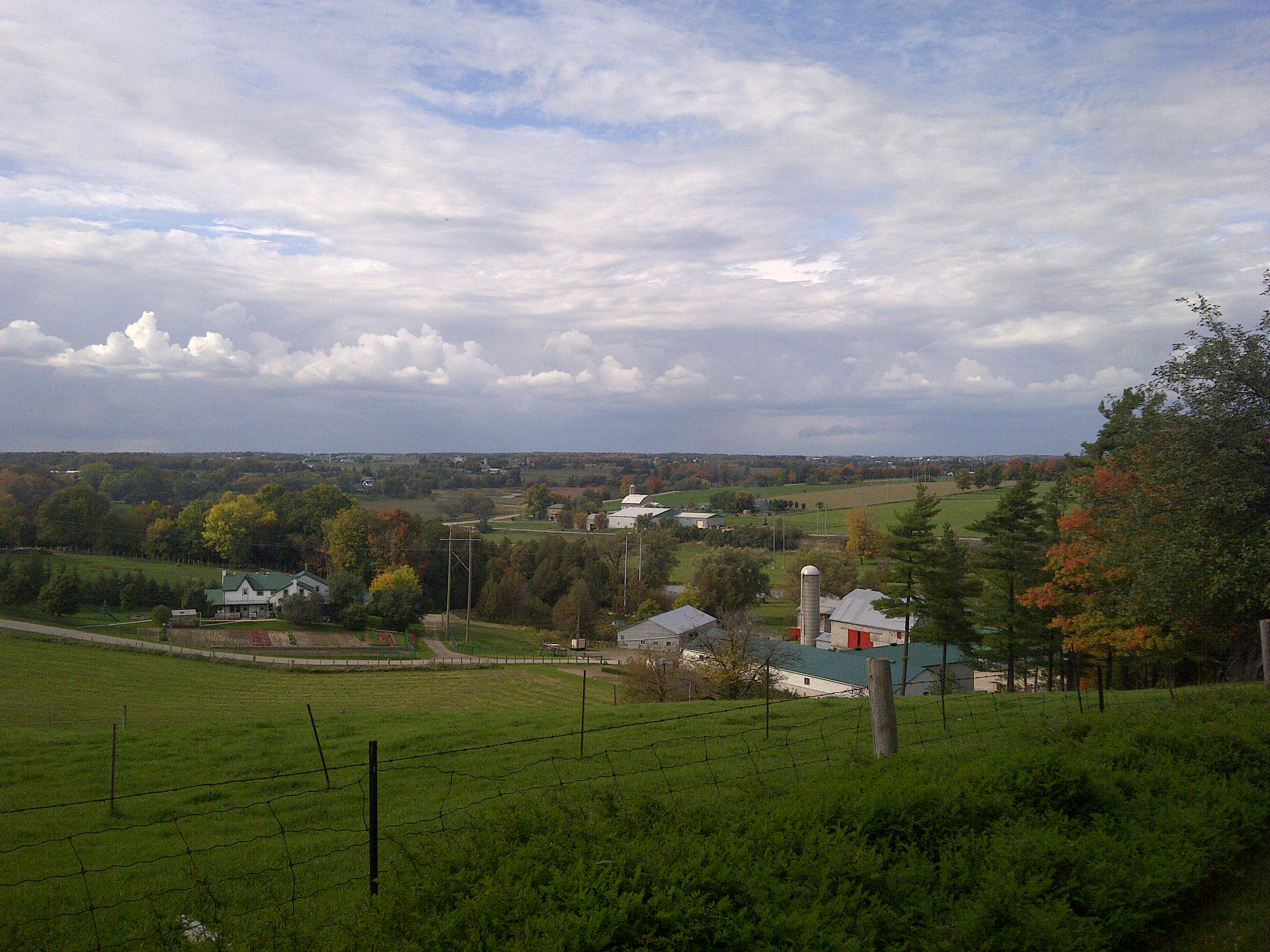
View of Wellesley Township from Ament Line near Hawkesville

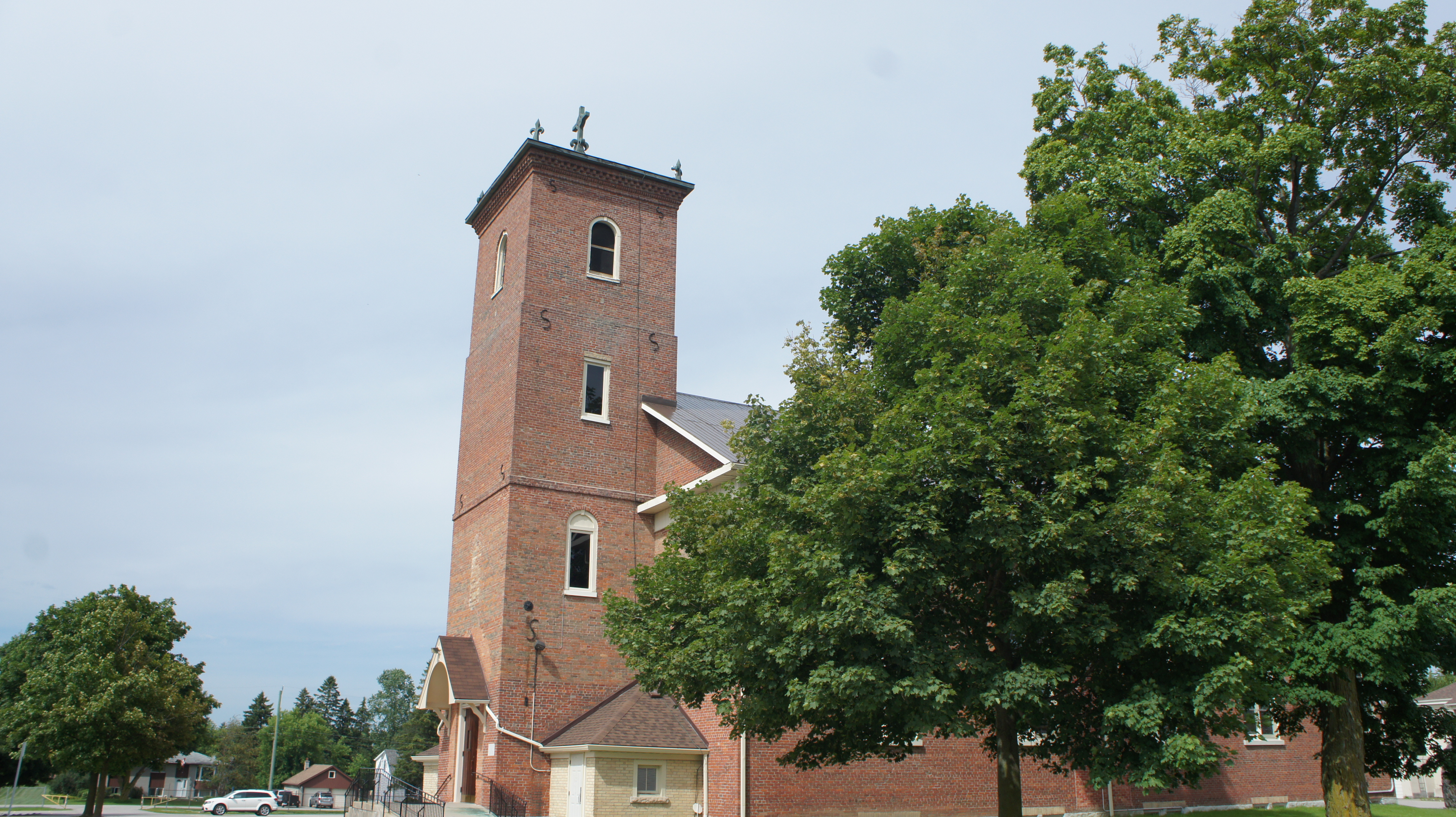
St. Clement Roman Catholic Church, St. Clements

Most of the earlier companies have left the town of Wellesley, but many historic buildings still remain that enrich the heritage of the downtown area. A notable business that had its beginning in Wellesley is Erb Transport, which moved to the nearby town of New Hamburg. Presently, the largest businesses in town are Wellesley Apple Products (founded in 1922), two hardware and lumber retailers, two feed retailers, a gas station, a bank, an arena, an accessible playground, a splash pad, a community centre, a grocery store, a drug store, a furniture store, a funeral home, retirement residences, three auto body shops, insurance brokerages, a veterinary clinic, a bakery, a flower shop, a pizza shop, a chiropractor, a catering business, three restaurants, a butcher shop, gourmet meats and deli, an art gallery, and numerous hair dressers.

The largest employer in the township is Jones Feed Mill, located in Linwood. They manufacture a large array of livestock and pet feeds as well as edible grains out of four facilities. The mill has been family run for almost 100 years.

== Arts and culture ==
In celebration of some of the town's most well-known exports, the Wellesley Apple Butter and Cheese Festival was first held in 1975, and has been held annually on the last Saturday in September ever since. The festivities include many street market venues, coach rides, remote-controlled boat races, open heritage sites and amusements, horseshoe-pitching contests, guided farm tours, live music, meals that can be purchased on the main street, and a classic car show, all of which now attract thousands of visitors each year.

Linwood hosted its first Elvis festival in August 2008. This features Elvis impersonators from throughout Ontario.

On June 24, 2006, the town held its first annual Art Around the Pond gala where artisans of all kind were able to exhibit and advertise their creations and expertise. Stalls and tables are organized around the north and south sides of the Wellesley Pond while visitors can navigate the trail on the east side to access both ends. Speeches by local governors are given and live music is played on the central island.

The Wellesley Fall Fair is held once every year on the second Tuesday and Wednesday of September following Labour Day. There is a parade at around noon on the Wednesday that the local public school participates in and there are also rides and activities located on the community centre grounds.

Wellesley has also held the Wellesley Santa Claus Parade early in December since 2005 which includes floats created by many local businesses, churches and other organizations from around the area mainly driving down Queen's Bush Road, Nafziger Road, Maple Leaf Street, and Molesworth Street.

Though only the Hawkesville Mennonite Church and the Countryside Conservative Mennonite Fellowship remain, Hawkesville has been the birthplace of several congregations. A Presbyterian congregation worshipped in town from 1868 to 1946. Their old church building was dedicated as Hawkesville Mennonite Church on January 1, 1950.

A United Brethren church also existed in Hawkesville from 1865 until 1904. The gothic windows and rafters are still visible inside the shop of Hawkwoods Custom Furniture.

Another group started meeting in 1931 and completed the building of a Gospel Hall next door to the village's cemetery in 1939. This group became the Hawkesville Bible Chapel, but their Hall became overcrowded and they moved into a new building in Wallenstein in 1968 where the Wallenstein Bible Chapel remains today.

The first Catholic Church built in the township was a log church built in St. Clements around 1840, in 1853, the log church was deemed too small and in 1858, a large brick church was completed. A brass band from Buffalo, New York gave a concert before the church dedication. At the time of its opening, it was said to be the largest and finest church west of Toronto.

The Region of Waterloo Library operates branches in St. Clements, Linwood and Wellesley Village, which host author readings, family storytimes, and a variety of other programs.

== Sports ==
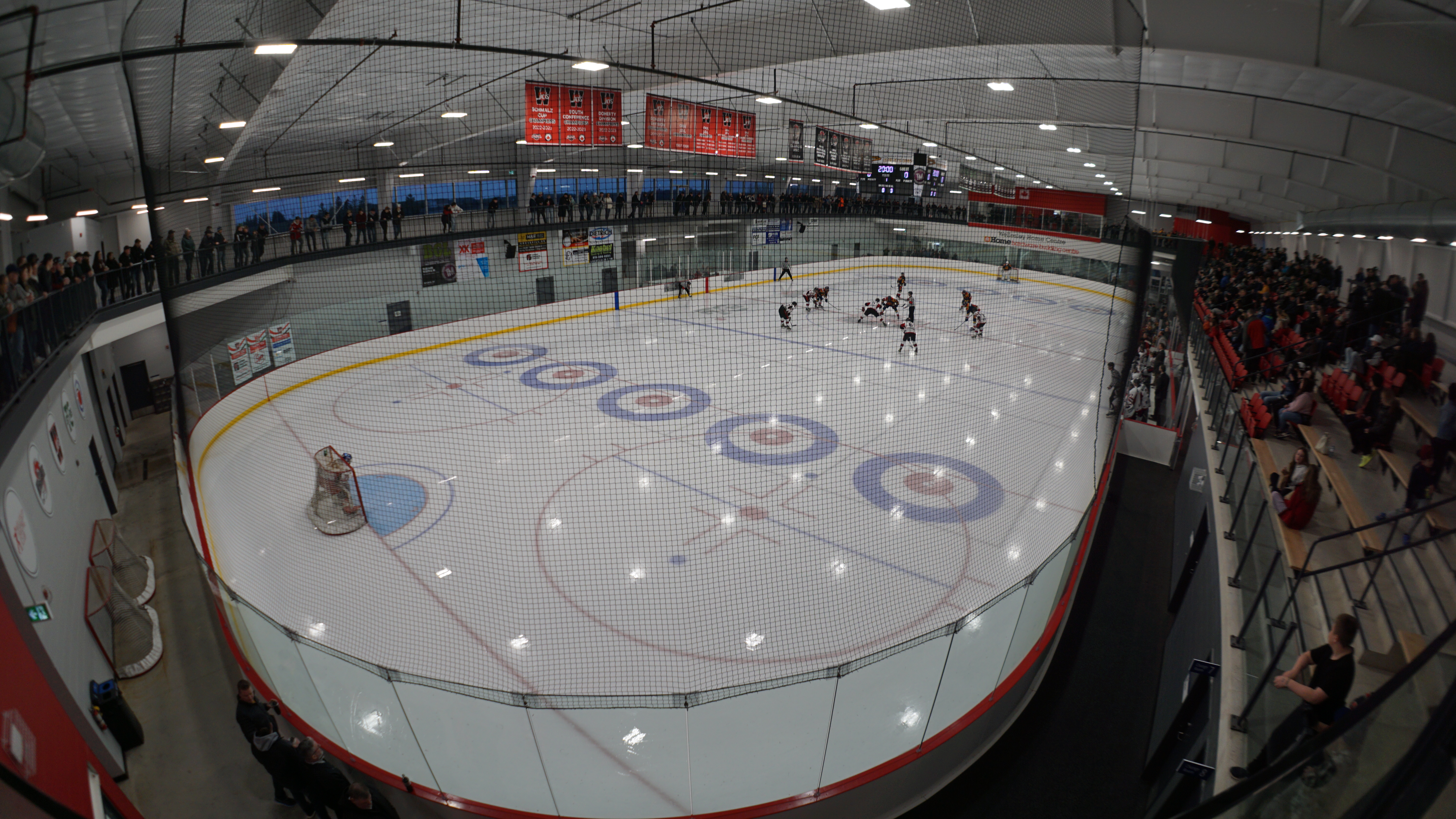
Wellesley Applejacks home game

Wellesley is home to the Wellesley Applejacks, a junior hockey team that plays in the Provincial Junior Hockey League.

The Linwood Chiefs are the township's main junior fastball club and play in the South Perth Men's Fastball League.

The Wellesley Fishing Derby is an annual event, held on Labour Day Monday, also located on the pond in which fishers attempt to catch three tagged fish which cash prizes are awarded for.

On occasion, the Canadian Horseshoe Pitching Championships are held in Wellesley at the Kitchener-Waterloo Khaki Club. They've been in town the years of 1983, 1985, 1995, and 2001.

The community hosts an inter-township soap box derby, Wellesley Soap Box Classic that includes numerous teams and individual contestants who race their vehicles down the hill of Nafziger Road, just short of the downtown area.

== See also ==
- List of townships in Ontario
- List of municipalities in Ontario
