= Smith School of Business =

Business school of Queen's University at Kingston

Coordinates: 44.22792°N 76.49746°W

- Other name: Stephen J.R. Smith School of Business
- Former names: School of Commerce and Administration (1937–1960); Queen's School of Business (1960–2015)
- Type: Public business school
- Established: 1963; 63 years ago (in current form)
- Parent institution: Queen's University at Kingston
- Academic staff: 155
- Undergraduates: 1,950
- Postgraduates: 1,163
- Doctoral students: 52
- Location: Kingston, Ontario, Canada
- Colours: Blue and gold
- Website: smith.queensu.ca

The Stephen J.R. Smith School of Business (commonly known as the Smith School of Business) is the business school of Queen's University at Kingston in Ontario, Canada. It is located at the university's Goodes Hall. Since July 2025, the school's interim dean has been Lynnette Purda.

Smith School of Business is fully accredited by the AACSB (United States) and the EFMD (EQUIS) (Europe).

== History ==
Queen's University launched its undergraduate business program in 1919, making it the oldest Bachelor of Commerce in Canada. The first woman to earn an undergraduate business degree, Beatrice Eakins, graduated from the program in 1922 alongside six other students. The MBA program was launched in 1960. Queen's School of Business became its own faculty in 1963, with Lawrence MacPherson as the first dean. The school was accredited by the AACSB in 1998, and it was the first program in Ontario to be accredited by the AACSB.

On October 1, 2015, the Queen's School of Business was renamed the Stephen J.R. Smith School of Business in recognition of a $50-million donation from Stephen J. R. Smith, a graduate of the Queen's University's Faculty of Engineering and Applied Science. The donation was at the time, the largest gift ever made to a Canadian business school, growing the school's endowment from $54 million to $104 million. As of 2015, this resulted in Smith being a close second in total endowment among Canadian business schools, next to only the Rotman School of Management.

== Programs ==
The School awards Bachelor of Commerce (BCom), Master of Business Administration (MBA), Executive MBA (EMBA), Accelerated MBA (AMBA), Master of Science in Management, (MSc) Master of Finance (MFin), Master of International Business (MIB), Master of Management Innovation and Entrepreneurship (MMIE), Master of Management in Artificial Intelligence (MMAI), Master of Management Analytics (MMA), Master of Digital Product Management (MDPM) and Ph.D. in Management degrees, as well as graduate diplomas in business (GDB)and accounting (GDA). The School also offers the Smith-Peking Double Degree in partnership with the Guanghua School of Management at Peking University and the Executive MBA Americas in partnership with the Samuel Curtis Johnson Graduate School of Management at Cornell University. Smith additionally offers the Global Online MBA, Full-time Master of Management Analytics, and Certificate in Business.

== Location ==
The majority of business classes are held in Goodes Hall. Opened in 2002, the building is named in honour of the family of Melvin Goodes, a Commerce '57 alumnus and former chairman and CEO of Warner–Lambert. In September 2012, a significant expansion of Goodes Hall was completed, increasing the size of the building by 75,000 ft^{2} to a total of 188,000 ft^{2}. The expansion included new classrooms, breakout rooms, and 51 additional faculty offices.

The Smith School of Business opened its first foreign campus in Dubai, United Arab Emirates, at the DIFC on May 25, 2007. Classes started in October 2007. The campus mainly hosts Queen's executive development programs.

SmithToronto is a teaching centre of the Smith School of Business outside of the Queen's University Campus, occupying the entire 30th floor of Simcoe Place at 200 Front Street West, in downtown Toronto. Established 24 years after the initiation of the school’s EMBA program in Toronto, SmithToronto encompasses 25,000 square feet of space, featuring classrooms, meeting rooms, staff offices, and special events spaces. It runs a range of programs including the Master of Finance, Master of Financial Innovation & Technology, Master of Management Analytics, and Master of Management in Artificial Intelligence. Additionally, three Boardroom Learning Centres, complete with interactive videoconference capabilities, serve the Executive and Accelerated MBA programs.

== Reputation and rankings ==
Business school rankings

Global
- QS MBA: 91
- Financial Times MBA: 62

The Smith School of Business ranked 1st nationally and 38th globally in highest number of graduates employed as Chief Executive Officers or equivalent in a Fortune Global 500 corporation. The MBA Class of 2019 had the highest total starting pay of any Canadian MBA program. Additionally, Smith has placed in national and international business school rankings.

- 4th business school in Canada by Bloomberg.
- 4th business school in Canada by Maclean's.

=== Canadian MBA Alliance ===
The school is also a founding member of the Canadian MBA Alliance which was created in 2013. All six members of the alliance rank among the world’s top 100 schools, according to their participation in key rankings – Financial Times, Business Week, and The Economist.

== Research ==
During the 2018–2019 academic year, Smith faculty published 44 articles in academic journals, 14 of which were ranked in the Financial Times’ 50 top-tier journals.

== Notable alumni ==
=== Undergraduate ===
==== Bachelor of Commerce ====
- Elon Musk, richest man in the world
- Chris Viehbacher, former CEO, Sanofi, former Chairman, Genzyme
- Douglas Peters, former Chief Economist, Toronto-Dominion Bank, former Secretary of State, Government of Canada
- Earle McLaughlin, former president, Royal Bank of Canada
- Gordon Nixon, former CEO, Royal Bank of Canada
- Joanna Griffiths, businesswoman
- John Stackhouse, Senior Vice President, Office of the CEO, Royal Bank of Canada, former Editor-in-Chief, The Globe and Mail
- Kimbal Musk, co-founder, Zip2, Big Green
- Melvin Goodes, former CEO, Warner-Lambert
- Neil Pasricha, best-selling author and public speaker

=== Graduate ===
==== MBA ====
- Andrew Lue, defensive back, Canadian Football League
- Christine Robinson, Canadian Olympic water polo player
- David Radler, former president, Ravelston Corporation
- Gabriel Beauchesne-Sévigny, Canadian Olympic sprint canoeist
- Greg Douglas, Canadian Olympic sailor
- Lee Parkhill, Canadian Olympic sailor
- Maryann Turcke, COO, National Football League, former president, Bell Media
- Megan Lukan, Canadian Olympic rugby sevens player
- Michele Romanow, co-founder and President, Clearbanc, Dragon, Dragon's Den
- Nik Nanos, founder, Nanos Research

==== Executive MBA ====
- Benoît Huot, Canadian Paralympic swimmer
- Jeremiah Brown, Canadian Olympic rower
- Kelly McCrimmon, GM, Vegas Golden Knights, owner, Brandon Wheat Kings
- Tessa Virtue, Canadian ice dancer

==== MMIE ====
- Martha McCabe, Canadian Olympic swimmer

== See also ==
- List of business schools in Canada
