= Natasha Henry-Dixon =

- Born: Natasha L. Henry

Academic background
- Education: York University
- Doctoral advisor: Michele Johnson
- Website: https://profiles.laps.yorku.ca/profiles/henryn/

Natasha L. Henry-Dixon (née Henry) is a Canadian historian, educator and academic known for work related to Black history in Ontario. She is a faculty member in the Department of History at York University and has served as the President of the Ontario Black History Society from 2017 - 2023.

== Education ==
Henry obtained a B.A., B.Ed. and M.Ed. from York University continuing on at the school to complete her doctoral studies. Her doctoral work was supervised by Michele Johnson.

== Career ==
Henry-Dixon is an Assistant Professor of African Canadian History at York University, Toronto, Canada. Henry-Dixon was a classroom teacher for over two decades. She became President of the Ontario Black History Society in 2017.

She has written and created numerous education resources related to Black history in Ontario and Canada, including articles for The Canadian Encyclopedia related to the topic.

In 2022, she authored Change Starts Now: Our Stories. Our History, summarizing archival research related to Black history in Guelph, Ontario. Henry drew on her PhD dissertation project -- "One Too Many: The Enslavement of Africans in Early Ontario, 1760 - 1834" -- to create an online resource about slavery in Ontario. The work draws on research into the history of enslaved people in Upper Canada drawn from the review of government records, church registers, newspapers and other historical documents.

In 2022, Henry joined the Department of History at York University as a tenure-stream faculty member with a focus on African Canadian History.

== Awards ==
Henry received the 2017 Curriculum Development Award from the Elementary Teachers' Federation of Ontario in recognition of classroom resources she created for Black History Month.

In 2018, she was awarded a Vanier Canada Graduate Scholarship.

== Publications ==
- Henry, Natasha L. (2010). Emancipation Day : celebrating freedom in Canada. Toronto: Natural Heritage Books. ISBN 978-1554887170.
- Henry, Natasha L. (2011). Talking about freedom : celebrating Emancipation Day in Canada. Toronto: Dundurn Press. ISBN 978-1459700505.
- Henry, Natasha L. (2022). Change Starts Now: our Stories, our History, our Heritage. PS Guelph. p. 28. ISBN 9781989157121.
