= Caroline Andrew =

Canadian political scientist (1942–2022)

President of the Canadian Political Science Association
- In office 1983–1984
- Preceded by: Edwin R. Black
- Succeeded by: Kalevi Holsti

Personal details
- Born: Caroline Parkin Andrew; 1942
- Died: November 23, 2022 (aged 80) Hamilton, Ontario, Canada
- Relatives: George Grant (uncle); William Lawson Grant (grandfather); Marcus Gee and George Szanto (brother-in-laws); Michael Ignatieff (first cousin)
- Education: University of British Columbia; Université Laval; University of Toronto
- Occupation: Political scientist; Franco-Ontarian activist

Academic work
- Discipline: Political science
- Sub-discipline: Urban politics; Women and politics
- Institutions: University of Ottawa

Caroline Parkin Andrew CM FRSC (1942 – November 23, 2022) was a Canadian political scientist and activist. A researcher of urban politics and women and politics and a professor at the University of Ottawa, she served as president of the Canadian Political Science Association (1983–1984), the first woman to do so, and was the moderator of the leaders' debate on women's issues during the 1984 Canadian federal election campaign. She also participated in activism for Franco-Ontarian interests and was awarded several awards for doing so, including investiture into the Order of Canada.

== Biography ==
=== Early life ===
Caroline Parkin Andrew was born in 1942. Her father Geoffrey Andrew worked at the University of British Columbia as Professor of English and eventually as Dean. Her mother Margaret Grant was the daughter of historian William Lawson Grant, through which Andrew's great-grandfather and great-great-grandfather were academic George Monro Grant and banker William Lawson, respectively. She was the niece of philosopher George Grant and the first cousin of Liberal Party of Canada leader Michael Ignatieff. She was the sister-in-law of novelist George Szanto and urban affairs journalist Marcus Gee.

Growing up in Vancouver, Andrew studied at the University of British Columbia, where she got her Bachelor of Science in political science in 1964, and Université Laval, where she got her Master of Social Science before obtaining her Doctor of Philosophy in political science at the University of Toronto in 1975. She married Jean-Paul St-Amand, whom she had met at Université Laval, and they had two daughters.

=== Academic career ===
Andrew worked at the University of Ottawa as a professor at their School of Political Studies, and she was the dean of the University of Ottawa Faculty of Social Sciences from 1997 to 2005. In addition, she was director of the Department of Political Science (1994–1997) and of the Centre of Governance (2008–2018). Eventually, the university promoted her from full professor to professor emeritus. From 1985 until 2003, she was an editorial board member for the Studies in Political Economy journal.

As an academic, Andrew specialized in urban politics and women and politics. She generally wrote about urban diversity in English and the effects of economic restructuring on housing in French. In 1983, she became the first woman president of the Canadian Political Science Association, serving until 1984. Her 1984 presidential address, "Women and the Welfare State", received retrospective praise as a "landmark article". She was the moderator of the leaders' debate on women's issues during the 1984 Canadian federal election campaign, the first of its kind. Fran Klodawsky commended her as an "internationally recognized expert on municipal politics, governance, feminism, and urban issues." Aedan Helmer described her as a "leading researcher on women and politics".

=== Activism ===
In the 1960s, Andrew spent some time working for the Royal Commission on Bilingualism and Biculturalism. She later became a Franco-Ontarian rights activist, with Helmer praising her as a "notable advocate for the Franco-Ontarian community". She later began going into French-language immersion, including writing more French-language publications, and she and her husband would later do the same to their daughters.

In 2006, the Government of Ontario awarded her the Prix des Francophiles. She was also awarded a 2012 Governor General's Award in Commemoration of the Persons Case, with her nomination supported by such organizations as Crime Prevention Ottawa and the Canadian Research Institute for the Advancement of Women, who praised her for "strengthen[ing] ties between Anglophone and Francophone women at a time when relationships in many groups were strained in the aftermath of Meech Lake." Her nephew, journalist Eric Andrew-Gee, later recalled her as an "ally of newcomers and Indigenous peoples" who "wrote extensively about how cities could support immigrants and worked hard with community groups to the same end".

=== Later life and death ===
Andrew was made a Fellow of the Royal Society of Canada in 2007. She was appointed to the Order of Ottawa in 2013. In 2015, she was appointed a Member of the Order of Canada in 2015 "for her academic research on cultural diversity, and on urban and feminist studies, and for her civic involvement with non-profit and community-based organizations."

Andrew died on November 23, 2022, in Hamilton, Ontario, aged 80. During her last few years, she had been treated for dementia.
