= Canadian Political Science Association =

The Canadian Political Science Association (French: Association canadienne de science politique) is an organization of political scientists in Canada. It is a bilingual organization and publishes the bilingual journal Canadian Journal of Political Science. The organization is headquartered in Ottawa, Ontario, and has an annual convention in conjunction with the Canadian Federation for the Humanities and Social Sciences. It was founded in 1912.

== Presidents ==
- Adam Shortt (Civil Service Commission), 1913–1914
- Oscar D. Skelton (Queen's), 1929–1930
- Stephen Leacock (McGill), 1934–1935
- R. H. Coats (Toronto), 1935–1936
- W. A. Mackintosh (Queen's), 1936–1937
- H. A. Innis (Toronto), 1937–1938
- J. W. Dafoe (Winnipeg Free Press), 1938–1939
- J. C. Hemmeon, 1939–1940
- W. C. Clark (Deputy Minister of Finance), 1940–1941
- H. Mitchell, 1941–1942
- C. A. Dawson, 1942–1943
- R. A. MacKay (Dalhousie), 1943–1944
- K. W. Taylor, 1944–1945
- R. MacGregor Dawson (Toronto), 1945–1946
- F. A. Knox, 1946–1947
- V.W. Bladen (Toronto), 1947–1948
- H. F. Angus (British Columbia), 1948–1949
- W. B. Hurd (McMaster), 1949–1950
- C. A. Curtis (Curtis), 1950–1951
- G.-H. Levesque (Laval), 1951–1952
- Herbert Marshall, 1952–1953
- Alexander Brady (Toronto), 1953–1954
- J. A. Corry (Queen's), 1954–1955
- J. D. Gibson, 1955–1956
- G. E. Britnell (Saskatchewan), 1956–1957
- G. A. Elliott (Alberta), 1957–1958
- S. D. Clark (Toronto), 1958–1959
- Mabel F. Timlin (Saskatchewan), 1959–1960
- C. A. Ashley, 1960–1961
- Eugene Forsey (Canadian Labour Congress), 1961–1962
- W.J. Waines, 1962–1963
- C. B. Macpherson (Toronto), 1963–1964
- Jean-Charles Falardeau (Laval), 1964–1965
- Harry G. Johnson (London School of Economics/Chicago), 1965–1966
- Anthony D. Scott (British Columbia), 1966–1967
- H. B. Mayo (Carleton), 1967–1968
- Donald V. Smiley (British Columbia), 1968–1969
- Douglas V. Verney (York), 1969–1970
- Gilles Lalande (Montréal), 1970–1971
- J. E. Hodgetts (Toronto), 1971–1972
- Jean Laponce (British Columbia), 1972–1973
- John Meisel (Queen's), 1973–1974
- Léon Dion (Laval), 1974–1975
- Donald C. Rowat (Carleton), 1975–1976
- Alan Cairns (British Columbia), 1976–1977
- Hugh Thorburn (Queen's), 1977–1978
- Kenneth D. McRae (Carleton), 1978–1979
- Paul W. Fox (Toronto), 1979–1980
- Walter D. Young (Victoria), 1980–1981
- Denis W. Stairs (Dalhousie), 1981–1982
- Edwin R. Black (Queen's), 1982–1983
- Caroline Andrew (Ottawa), 1983–1984
- Kalevi J. Holsti (British Columbia), 1984–1985
- Frederick C. Engelmann, (Alberta), 1985–1986
- O.P. Dwivedi (Guelph), 1986–1987
- John C. Courtney (Saskatchewan), 1987–1988
- David J. Elkins (British Columbia), 1988–1989
- André-J. Bélanger (Montréal), 1989–1990
- Peter H. Russell (Toronto), 1990–1991
- Vincent Lemieux (Laval), 1991–1992
- V. Seymour Wilson (Carleton), 1992–1993
- Sylvia Bashevkin (Toronto), 1993–1994
- David Smith (Saskatchewan), 1994–1995
- Peter Aucoin (Dalhousie), 1995–1996
- Jane Jenson (Montréal), 1996–1997
- Tom Pocklington (Alberta), 1997–1998
- Donald J. Savoie (Moncton), 1998–1999
- Roger Gibbins (Calgary), 1999–2000
- Kenneth McRoberts (York), 2000–2001
- R. Kenneth Carty (British Columbia), 2001–2002
- Grace Skogstad (Toronto), 2002–2003
- Robert Young (Western Ontario), 2003–2004
- André Blais (Montréal), 2004–2005
- Kim Richard Nossal (Queen's), 2005–2006
- Elisabeth Gidengil (McGill), 2006–2007
- Richard Johnston (Pennsylvania), 2007–2008
- Miriam Smith (York), 2008–2009
- Keith Banting (Queen's), 2009–2010
- Graham White (University of Toronto), 2010–2011
- Reeta Tremblay (Victoria), 2011–2012
- Michael Atkinson (Saskatchewan), 2012–2013
- Alain Noël (Montréal), 2013–2014
- Jill Vickers (Carleton), 2014–2015
- William Cross (Carleton), 2015–2016
- Yasmeen Abu-Laban (Alberta), 2016–2017
- Janet Hiebert (Queen's), 2017–2018
- François Rocher (Ottawa), 2018–2019
- Barbara Arneil (British Columbia), 2019–2020
- Joanna Everitt (University of New Brunswick – Saint John), 2020–2021
- Cheryl Collier (University of Windsor), 2021–2022
- André Lecours (University of Ottawa), 2022–2023
