= Nossal =

Nossal may refer to:

- Nossal High School, Berwick, Victoria, Australia

== People with the surname ==
- Gustav Nossal (born 1931), Australian biologist
- Kim Richard Nossal (fl. 1976–2019), Canadian educator
- Nancy Goldman Nossal (1937–2006), American molecular biologist

== See also ==
- Nosal (surname)
- Nossa, a genus of moths
