= Benjamin Cashore =

Canadian political scientist

Benjamin William Cashore is a Canadian political scientist. He is the Li Ka Shing Professor in Public Management and the Director of the Institute for Environment and Sustainability at the Lee Kuan Yew School of Public Policy in Singapore.

== Career ==
Cashore grew up in British Columbia, Canada. He obtained a BA in political science at Carleton University in 1986, followed by a MA in political science at Carleton in 1988. He held a number of research and teaching jobs in the following years, including for Audrey McLaughlin, who at the time led the New Democratic Party. During 1996 and 1997 he was a Fulbright fellow at Harvard University, and he completed a PhD at the University of Toronto in 1997. His thesis was titled "Governing Forestry: Environmental Group Influence in British Columbia and the US Pacific Northwest", and his advisor was Grace Skogstad.

During 1996-2007, Cashore worked as an academic in postdoctoral and junior professor positions at Harvard, the University of British Columbia, Auburn University, Yale University, and the Australian National University. In 2007, Cashore was appointed full professor in the Yale School of the Environment, with a cross posting to the Department of Political Science. Cashore remained at Yale until 2019, and joined the faculty at the National University of Singapore in 2020. As of 2025, he is the director of the Institute for Environment and Sustainability at within the Lee Kuan Yew School of Public Policy.

== Awards and honors ==
- 2001 John McMenemy Prize from the Canadian Journal of Political Science
- 2005 Harold & Margaret Sprout Award from the International Studies Association
- 2014 Scientific Achievement Award from the International Union of Forest Research Organizations
- 2023 Ken Young Prize from the Policy & Politics journal
- 2025 Distinguished scholar award from the Environmental Studies Section of the International Studies Association
