= Gender empowerment =

Empowerment of people of any gender

Gender empowerment is the empowerment of people of any gender. While conventionally, the aspect of it is mentioned for empowerment of women, the concept stresses the distinction between biological sex and gender as a role, also referring to other marginalized genders in a particular political or social context.

Gender empowerment has become a significant topic of discussion in regard to development and economics. Entire nations, businesses, communities, and groups can benefit from the implementation of programs and policies that adopt the notion of women empowerment. Empowerment is one of the main procedural concerns when addressing human rights and development. The Human Development and Capabilities Approach, The Millennium Development Goals, and other credible approaches/goals point to empowerment and participation as a necessary step if a country is to overcome the obstacles associated with poverty and development.

== Measuring ==
Gender empowerment can be measured through the Gender Empowerment Measure, or the GEM. The GEM shows women's participation in a given nation, both politically and economically. Gem is calculated by tracking "the share of seats in parliament held by women; of female legislators, senior officials and managers; and of female profession and technical workers; and the gender disparity in earned income, reflecting economic independence." It then ranks countries given this information. Other measures that take into account the importance of female participation and equality include: the Gender Parity Index and the Gender Development Index (GDI).

== Use and adoption of measurement ==
As afore mentioned above, the HDI, GEM and GDI are the main tools to use to measure Gender Empowerment. These measurements have been both useful however also mis-used. When these measurements are applied for analysis, they are not always successful. Both tools have their critiques due to their focuses on certain measures and factors that are considered such as use of quantitative measures and lack of social factors. Generally, for an example of empowerment to be correctly measured, one will have to independently find a case. The National Human Development Reports are examples of good use and adoption of measurement according to Schuler. The 2004 National Human Development Report (NHDR) of Jordan is an example of a report that compares the GDI and HDI for analysis of gender issues, as it successfully illustrated the gap between the two and which region of Jordan has the most severe loss of human development due to gender issues. However, for developing nations, GDI and GEM as options of indicators are not always the best choice. The GDI and GEM are dependent of the situation. Lack of information on Gender negatively affects the adoption of measures such as GEM within some HDR Reports, whereas the GDI does not face the same limitations.

According to Schuler (2006), "“The GDI and the GEM have attracted minimal attention in the international press and, the introduction of each index does not have seemed to have started a public debate on the overall issue of gender inequality." In academia, the GDI and GEM have inspired a number of papers that have evaluated their strengths and shortcomings.

Gender Parity Index

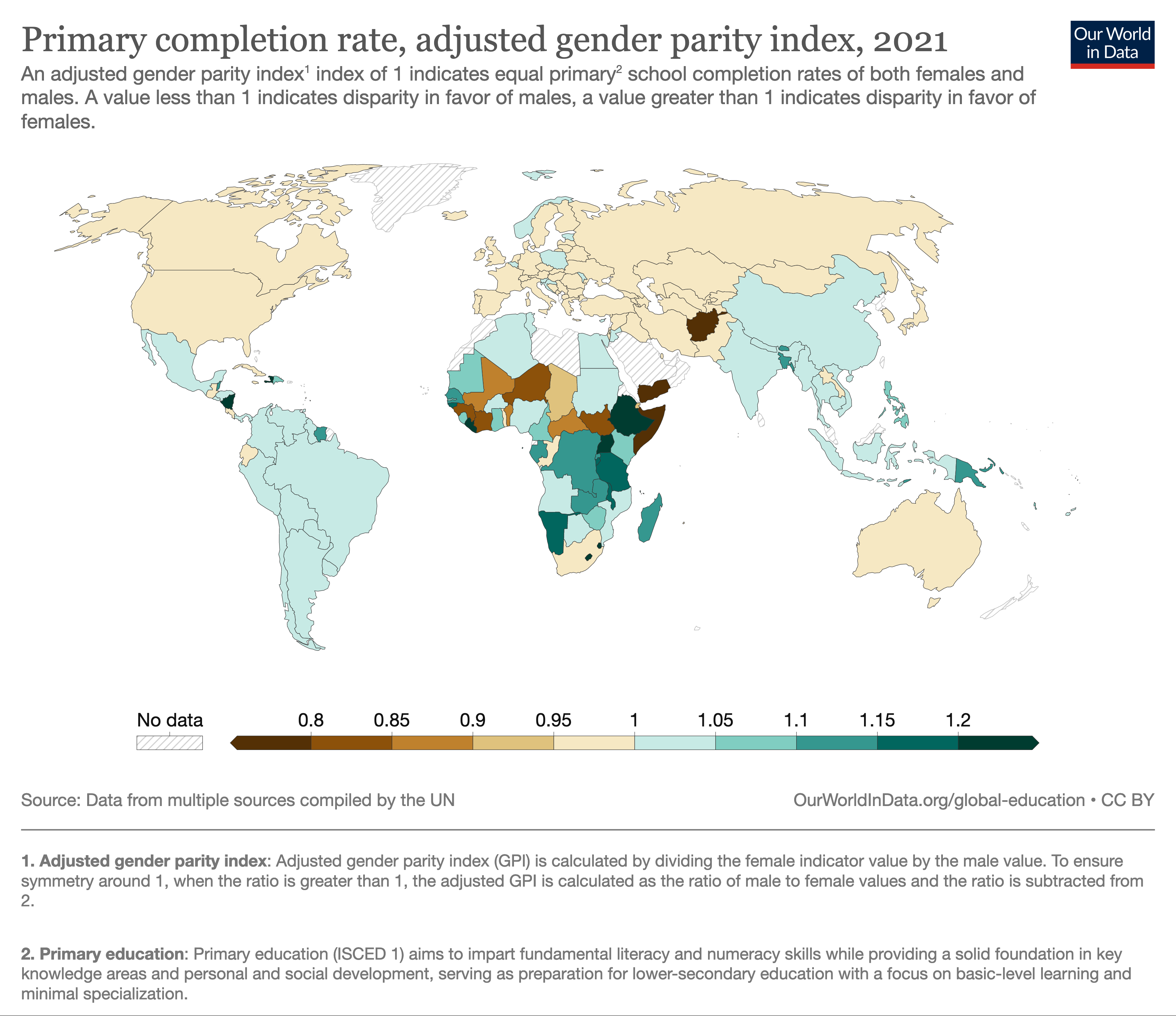
Example of a Gender Parity Index - Primary Education Completion Rate

Gender Empowerment can be influenced by its social impact. Societal attitudes play an important role in shaping the issues and opportunities individuals face when achieving gender equality. The broader social environment of a nation is a catalyst towards empowering genders. Community values, practices and values are also a factor.

== Origins ==
The concept of gender empowerment has gained significant attention, and its implications have been explored in a number of contexts. Since the 1970s, the term ‘empowerment’ has gained popularity, however with revolutionaries such as Agnodice, gender empowerment was known to have started back in 400BC.

Empowerment and its ideals is now noticeably highlighted within international development organisations, and the concept gained a strong placement within the international and developmental agenda. Initially conceived as a way to oppose Hierarchical development models, empowerment now has been reimagined as a tool to assist in enhancing institutional efficiency rather than fostering transformative social change. Empowerment now takes action rather than being just an idea.

With movements such as Feminism and the Black Power initiative, the origins of gender empowerment can be traced back to the mid 20th century. Gender Empowerment is heavily written between the waves of feminism. Beginning in the 19th to 20th Century, suffrage was a key feature. It can be said that Gender Empowerment is most predominantly seen in women's history.

Lasting inconsistencies within gender roles across the world can occur through cultural values and beliefs regarding gender inequality passing on through generations. Academics such as Bourdieu have also further developed the idea of gender empowerment. Bourdieu refers to the "objective social conditions and relatively independent social spaces with their own values and regulative principles in which individuals are embedded."

Among activists, associations and NGO's, Gender Empowerment is ripe and has seen remarkable success. Its specific origin is unclear however has contributed to a deeper understanding of gender inequality.

== Gender empowerment in action ==
There are a number of examples of Gender Empowerment throughout history. Gender Empowerment is more than familiarised within the history of feminism and its movements. Popular movements tend to be embedded in broad-based networks, and past research shows that when leadership reflects a larger range of perspectives and diverse backgrounds, a coordinated effort or solidarity-based action is much more likely to be successful or effective.

=== Kate Sheppard ===
Kate Sheppard was a notable activist for Female Voting Rights in New Zealand. Kate, alongside many other women fought for the women's right to vote and presented a Parliamentary petition with 32,000 signatures leading for New Zealand in 1893 to grant national voting rights to women.

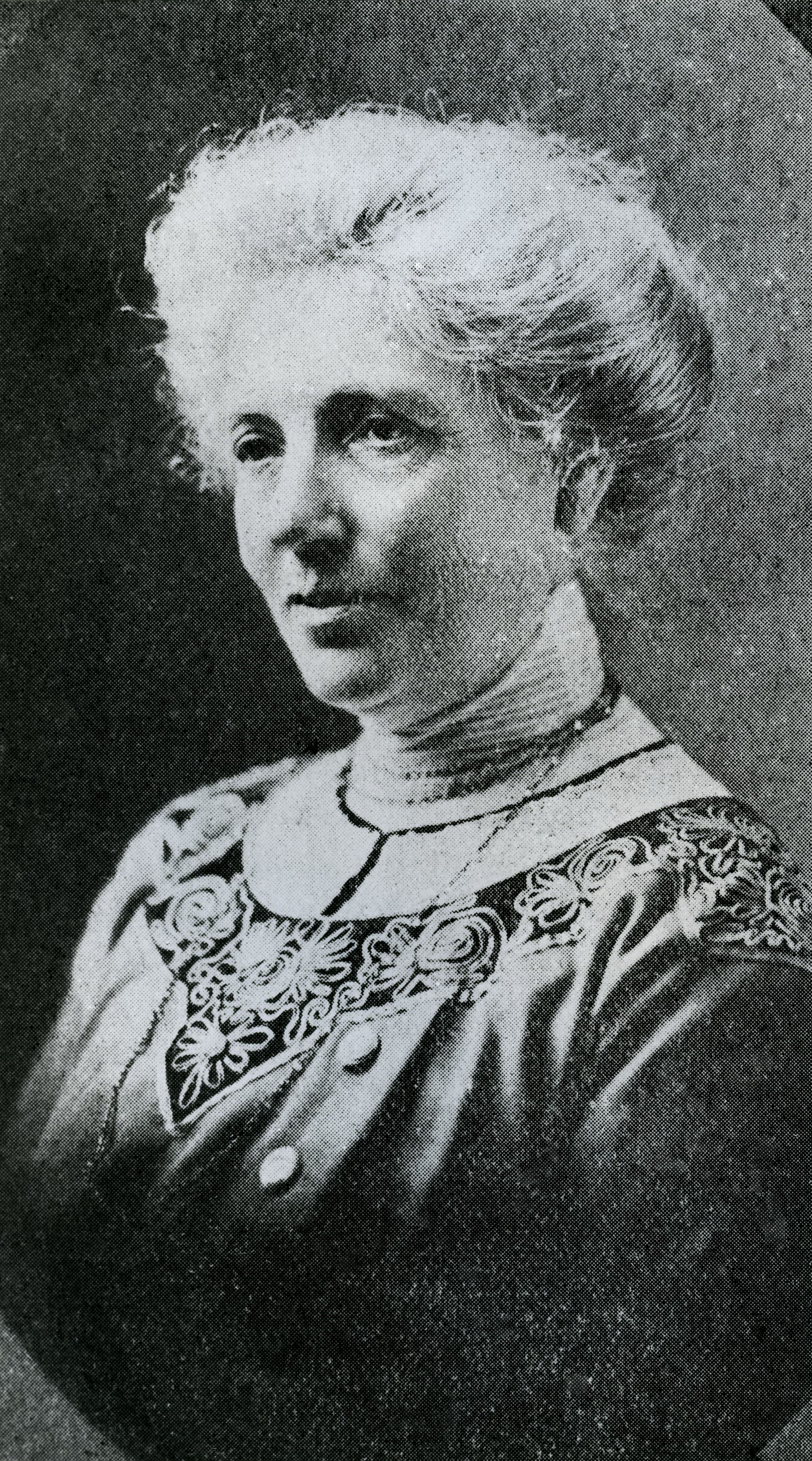
Kate Sheppard

=== Women in development ===
In the International Year of Women in 1975, the Women in Development model or the women in empowerment scheme, the United Nations pushed the first international policy for women within this agenda. The adoption of WID policies by a number of governments and NGO's and the establishment of female ministries in many of the UN's partnering nations were among many positive outcomes of the Women in Development Model.

=== #MeToo Movement ===
The term ‘MeToo’ was created in 2006 by activist Taran Burke, originally in response to actions of sexual violence, encouraging victims to stand up and speak out. Initially used to focus on women in minority's, the term then gain popularity again in the late 2010s with the MeToo Movement as Film producer Harvey Weinstein was accused of multiple counts of rape and sexual assault.

=== Australian Human Rights Commission ===
According to the Australian Journal of Human Rights (2020) there is legislation in Australia that protects women from unfair treatment on the basis of their sex, marital or relationship status. This legislation also incriminates sexual harassment, including in the workplace. Around 300 companies since 2013, have implemented gender-equity strategies. Nevertheless, the results of gender-focused empowerment programs have varied significantly.

=== Feminist Popular Education ===
In the early 1980s, as a response to the male-dominated approaches prevalent in mainstream educational and social movements, feminist popular education arose. Around the same time, feminist critiques and broader feminist interventions occurred that questioned educational practices and theories within varied social action spaces. Feminist Popular Education aims to support personal and social empowerment and specifically cares for the conditions and positions of women. It revisits and challenges existing gender relations while also highlighting how social categories such as race, ethnicity and age influence the framing of gender.

Empowerment programs such as Feminist Popular Education, though diverse and rooted in distinct cultural contexts, often stem from shared group efforts to foster awareness of lived experiences. The core objective is to disrupt the systemic imbalances of power, echoing the initial inspiration that gave rise to the concepts.

== Approaches ==
The approach to gender empowerment varies. Academics such as Bourdieu, focused on the diversity of experiences and how people navigate social situations upon when one's society it is disrupted., and an important approach to advancing gender equality has involved the use of gender mainstreaming tools. These ensure to integrate the perspectives of both men and women into policies and planning processes across all contexts.

More specifically from a gender empowerment perspective, female gender empowerment may be affected by various organisational approaches, depending on what they are.

Below is an example of a relational framework that approaches gender empowerment. At a Macro, Meso and Micro Level, this framework reconstructs gender empowerment. The macro level is the big picture at a broadcast level including culture and politics, whereas the meso level shows how social rules are repeated in institutions such as workplaces and schools, and the micro level is at the personal level which looks at how both society and jobs shape a person's identity, and how a person may see themselves differently depending on their social background. Syed's framework is seen below.

=== Examples at macro-Level ===
- “Legal empowerment” are laws that give people power by promoting equal opportunities such as anti-discrimination laws.
- “Political Empowerment” involves women in all areas of decision making such as political decisions, leadership and religious institutions.
- “Economic Empowerment” ensures women have access to financial resources and assets such as property and bank account ownership.
- “Social Empowerment” is about challenging and aiming to change harmful social stereotypes such as the undervaluing of women's roles as mother's or caregivers.

=== Examples at meso-Level ===
- “Legal Compliance” is obeying the laws that promote equal opportunity and prevent discrimination.
- “Diversity Policies” are organisational strategies for managing gender diversity, such as offering gender-specific benefits such as maternity leave.
- “Flexibility” is the ability to offer alternative and flexible work arrangements that help support a work-life balance and managing both women's and men's personal and familial responsibilities.
- “Affirmative Action” can be seen by promoting women into leadership and decision-making roles within institutions such as corporate board positions.

=== Examples at micro-Level ===
- “Intersectionality” is acknowledging the complex challenges women face due to overlapping identities like those shaped by religion or sexuality or gender.
- “Identity and Agency” is valuing women's ability to make choices, including decisions those related to well-being, careers, and those that shape personal identities.
- “Autonomy” can be tackling issues of inequality and power imbalances that affect women in private spheres such as family settings which includes the right to physical autonomy.
- “Literacy” is ensuring that women have access to all forms of education such as vocational training.

The framework connects the three interconnected levels of analysis to create a more complete and practical understanding of diversity and equal opportunity, but also what it means and how its applied in a real-life context.

==== Australia's approach ====
Australian Government's aid program's overarching objective is to achieve gender equality and women's empowerment. There are similarities here in comparison to the mentioned framework above too. According to the Australian Government Department of Foreign Affairs and Trade (2016), partner countries essentially play a key role in promoting gender equality by identifying challenges and implementing solutions. On a global scale, contributing to international conversations and efforts.

The Australian Government Department of Foreign Affairs and Trade have also committed to a Gender Equality Fund in 2015. Within the financial year of 2020-2021 in the response to the COVID-19 pandemic, the fund received a total of $65 million just that year.

Similarly, the Australian Government Department of the Prime Minister and Cabinet developed a strategy supporting the Australian Government's aim for gender equality. According to the Department of the Prime Minister and Cabinet (2025) they vision to keep the nation a safe place where there are equal outcomes for both genders.

Australia is also a part of a number of advocacy groups and partnerships that work towards promoting initiatives and strengthening actions to combat gender-based violence. A number of these groups include the UN Group of Friends for the Elimination of Violence against Women and Girls, the Generation Equality Forum Action Coalition, and the Call to Action on Protection of Gender-Based Violence in Emergencies. Providing monetary support since 2010, Australia is a long-standing member of the UN Women's Ending Violence against Women and Girls global movements. Australia continues to have ongoing engagement within global efforts to address gender-based issues.

== Migration and gender empowerment ==
Migration plays a role in shaping gender dynamics and encouraging new pathways for Gender Empowerment. For a reason whether economic, social or political, migration intersects with gender, influencing access to factors such as education, employment and legal rights. For Gender Empowerment, structural and cultural factors all play a role in shaping migrants’ experiences.

Within developing third-world countries, labour migration has benefits on the economy of the country of origin, alongside the number of possibilities the work has for the lives and income of female migrants.

Employment cannot be directly tied to empowerment either because of certain terms of employment. Where minimum wage migrant women are mainly based, types of employment such as ‘enclave employment’ does not necessarily direct towards empowerment. Low wages and indecent working standards, with little opportunity for progression can lead to a severe disconnect between employment and empowerment within migrating women or men. To be taken advantage of without knowledge, is where the disconnect lies. Within migrant hosting countries, between employment and discrimination there are issues such as an arising gender pay gap, where women who are just as trained and educated as their male counterparts are still paid less. Appointing to this can also be segregation by gender, lack of access to information and lack of legal status.

Migration and empowerment is a complex and conflicting narrative at times where migration can offer new means of employment and opportunities for economic success, however, can also expose those to new ways of exploitation and violation.

Motivation and empowerment drives some migrant workers, some working to save for their families or to just aim to work outside of home, or some working from their own autonomy to live a life they wish to live. Despite certain working conditions, most female migration, excluding cases of abuse and situations of trafficking, offers a number of positive outcomes for the women involved, including self-agency and self-confidence.

There are benefits to migration leading to empowerment especially of those starting within less-fortunate situations. Within some nations, economic success has been caused by internal female migration. According to Ghosh (2020) examples that within the country of Bangladesh, female migrant workers make most of the demographic working in the garment industry.

While migration presents certain risks and inequalities, it also serves as a vital tool for gender empowerment when supported by fair employment practices, legal practices and inclusive social structures. Harnessing the empowerment potential of migration, addressing systemic barriers and ensuring decent work conditions are encouraged to be put in place in both nations receiving migrants and of those sending them.

== See also ==
- Anti-gender movement
- Diversity, equity, and inclusion
- Diversity (politics)
- Diversity training
- Gender and politics
- Gender diversity
- Gender equality
- Gender essentialism
- Respect
- Suicide in LGBT youth
- Sociology of gender
- Women's empowerment
