= Nosal (surname) =

Nosal, Nosál, or Nosáľ is a surname. Nosal is the standard Polish spelling and the standard transliteration from Ukrainian Носаль. The Czech and Slovak forms are spelled Nosál and Nosáľ (feminine: Nosálová, Nosáľová).

Notable people with the surname include:

- Mariusz Nosal (born 1974), Polish footballer
- Yevdokiya Nosal (1918–1943), Ukrainian aviator

== See also ==
- Nossal (disambiguation), non-standard spelling
