= Barbara Arneil =

British-Canadian political scientist

Barbara Arneil CM
- Awards: Order of Canada (2023); Fellow of the Royal Society of Canada (2022); C.B. Macpherson Prize in Political Theory (2018); David Easton Award (2018)

Academic background
- Education: PhD, 1992, University College London
- Thesis: All the world was America: John Locke and the American Indian. (1992)

Academic work
- Institutions: University of British Columbia
- Main interests: Identity politics history of political thought

Morag Barbara Arneil CM is a Scottish-Canadian political scientist. She is a Professor of Political Science at the University of British Columbia and a Fellow of the Royal Society of Canada.

== Early life and education ==
Arneil completed her PhD at University College London. Her thesis was entitled All the world was America: John Locke and the American Indian.

== Career ==
Following her PhD, Arneil moved to North America and joined the faculty in the Department of Political Science at the University of British Columbia. In 1996, she published her thesis in a book entitled John Locke and America: the defence of English colonialism. A few years later, she published her second book Politics and feminism. In 2013, Arneil was named a senior recipient of UBC's Killam Research Prize in recognition of her "outstanding research and scholarly contributions." From 2016 to 2019, Arneil served as Department Head of the Political Science Department at UBC.

In 2017, Arneil published Domestic Colonies: The Turn Inward to Colony which received numerous awards. It received the 2018 American Political Science Association David Easton Award for being "a book that broadens the horizons of contemporary political science by engaging issues of philosophical significance in political life through any of a variety of approaches in the social sciences and humanities." It also won the 2018 C.B. Macpherson Prize in Political Theory from the Canadian Political Science Association. In 2022, Arneil's scholarly work was recognized with an election to be a Fellow of the Royal Society of Canada.

She was appointed to the Order of Canada in June 2023.

== Selected publications ==
- John Locke and America: The defence of English colonialism (1996)
- Politics and feminism (1999)
- Diverse Communities: The Problem with Social Capital (2006)
- Sexual Justice/Cultural Justice: Critical Perspectives in Theory and Practise (with Avigail Eisenberg, Monique Deveaux, Rita Dhamoon, 2006)
- Political Theory and Disability (with Nancy Hirschmann, 2017)
- Domestic Colonies: The Turn Inward to Colony (2017)
