= O. P. Dwivedi =

Onkar Prasad Dwivedi CM FRSC (January 20, 1937 – January 26, 2013) was Professor Emeritus of Political Science and Public Administration at the University of Guelph. In 2005 he was appointed to the Order of Canada, the highest civilian honour in Canada.

== Early life ==
Onkar Prasad Dwivedi was born near Bindki in the state of Uttar Pradesh, India, on January 20, 1937. He came to Canada in 1963 as a student, where he earned a doctorate in political science at Queen's University, Kingston in 1968. Dwivedi joined the University of Guelph in 1967. He taught environmental policy and law and comparative public and development administration and served as chair of the Department of Political Science from 1979 to 1990. He was named University Professor Emeritus in 2003.

He died on January 29, 2013, in Guelph, Ontario, Canada of complications due to cancer, at the age of 76.

== Publications ==
Throughout his professional career Dwivedi authored over 30 books and 100 journal articles and book chapters. His area of research included subjects such as environmental policy and law, development administration, administrative culture, corruption and public sector ethics.

A partial list of publications authored and/or edited by Dwivedi includes:

- Managing Development in a Global Context (Palgrave-Macmillan, London, 2007);

- Global Environmental Challenges: Perspectives from the South (Broadview Press, Peterborough, 2008);

- Administrative Culture in a Global Context (de Sitter Publications, Toronto, 2003);

- Sustainable Development and Canada (Peterborough, 2001);

- From Bureaucracy to Public Management: The Administrative Culture of the Government of Canada (Broadview Press, Peterborough, 1999);

- Where Corruption Lives (Kumarian Press, Bloomfield, USA, 2001);

- India's Environmental Policies Programmes and Stewardship (Macmillan Press, London, 1997);

- Governing India (New Delhi, 1998);

- Bureaucracy and the Alternatives in World Perspective (Macmillan Press, London, 1999);

- and over 125 chapters/articles in professional journals and scholarly books.

== International Thought Leadership ==
He was a past president of the Canadian Political Science Association (Ottawa), president of the Canadian Asian Studies Association (Montreal), and a former Vice President of the International Association of Schools and Institutes of Administration, Brussels, Belgium. Dwivedi was an Associate of the Centre for Studies in Leadership. He acted as a special advisor for organizations such as the World Bank, UNESCO, UNO, UNESCAP, WHO, and CIDA. His geographic area of research spans countries such as Canada, USA, Papua New Guinea, India, Mauritius, and various developing nations.

In 1986 the government of Ontario appointed Dwivedi to its Environmental Assessment Board for a three-year term. In 2000 he was appointed by the United Nations, Department of Economic and Social Affairs, New York, for two years as a member of its Group of Experts on Globalization and the State.

== Awards and honours ==
Dwivedi was recognized in the field of public administration, but it was his work in environmental policy for which he was distinguished. In 1988, the University of Lethbridge, Canada conferred upon him the honorary degree of Doctor of Law (LL. D.). In 1999, he was elected Fellow of the Royal Society of Canada. In 2005, he was appointed to the Order of Canada, the highest Canadian civilian honour. In 2008, the University of Waterloo conferred upon him the honorary degree of Doctor of Environmental Studies (D.E.S.).

== Charity and Social Responsibility ==
In addition to other charitable work, Dwivedi was responsible for funding and building a school in Bindki, Fatehpur District, India, an optometric hospital and walk-in clinic in Bithoor, India, and organizing eye clinics in rural Fatehpur District, India, through the DD Trust Foundation, a charitable organization he helped establish in honor of his grandfather.

The Sushila Devi Eye Hospital was established by Dwivedi and other family members in Bithoor, Uttar Pradesh, India. It opened in 2008 and has two doctors and five technicians, along with a walk-in clinic. In 2009, more than 8,500 people were seen at the hospital for eye examinations and tests, and 715 had cataract operations. It provides free services for patients and provides preference to women and girls from rural areas who may have difficulty getting treatment elsewhere.

Later in life, Dwivedi was also certified as a yoga instructor and offered free yoga classes at the University of Guelph.

The OP Dwivedi Award was established in 2008 by the International Association of Schools and Institutes of Administration (IASIA)to honor a distinguished international scholar or practitioner for significant contributions to public administration and public policy in the world. Notable recipients of this award include Luiz Inácio Lula da Silva, President of Brazil, in 2009.
