= Mabel F. Timlin =

Canadian economist (1891–1976)

Mabel Timlin
- Mabel Timlin
- Born: December 6, 1891; Wisconsin, US
- Died: September 19, 1976 (aged 84)
- Occupation: Economist
- Known for: First tenured woman economics professor at a Canadian university

Mabel Timlin (December 6, 1891 - September 19, 1976) FRSC OC was a Canadian economist who in 1950, became the first tenured woman economics professor at a Canadian university. Timlin was a pioneer in the field of economics and is best known for her work and interpretation of Keynesian theory, as well as Canadian immigration policy and post WWII monetary stabilization policy. In addition to her successful research career, Timlin was the first woman to serve as vice president (from 1953 to 1955) and president (from 1959 to 1960) of the Canadian Political Science Association. She was also one of the first women and one of the very few Canadian economists to serve on the Executive Committee of the American Economic Association.

== Early life and education ==
Born in the state of Wisconsin, Timlin grew up in a small town and moved to Saskatchewan upon graduating high school, where she worked as a teacher until she was hired as a secretary at the University of Saskatchewan in 1921. It was there that she obtained an English degree after feeling disappointed by the courses offered by the Economics Department and concluded that she would be better off to teach herself, all while working as a full-time secretary. Timlin then obtained her Ph.D. in economics at the University of Washington in 1940, and shortly thereafter published her dissertation "Keynesian Economics: A Synthesis" in 1942. Her university teaching career began as an assistant professor in 1941, followed by the appointment to associate professor in 1946, and then full professor in 1950 at the University of Saskatchewan.

== Research ==
Timlin’s research greatly contributed to the fields of economic theory and immigration policy within Canada. The reception of Timlin’s contribution to Keynesian economics helped to form the unique characteristics of the Canadian economic system. Her work on Canadian immigration and monetary stabilization policies provided important implications for Canadian economic development and policy.

=== Keynesian economics ===
Mabel Timlin was responsible for introducing Keynesian economics to Canada. A key area of Timlin’s research surrounded The General Theory of Employment, Interest and Money presented by John Maynard Keynes. Upon completion of her dissertation in 1940, the University of Toronto Press published her work under the title "Keynesian Economics" in 1942. Timlin approached Keynes’s General Theory within a general equilibrium framework. The long-term interest rate presented in Keynes’s model is replaced by an analysis of the overall composition of interest rates and how it fits into the system’s equilibrium.

Timlin proposed three main models in her work: a static Fundamental Model and two Supplementary Models. The Fundamental Model predicted that planned savings and investment would remain the same, however from one week to another, changes in income are attributed to the relative interest rate and the marginal propensity to consume. The two Supplementary Models are essentially reversible, where in one Model the contracts for the services of factors of production are completed on Monday and on Tuesday the sales contracts are made. The sequence is reversed in the second Supplementary Model. Timlin focused on the unstable equilibrium of a Keynesian system and highlighted the conditions in Week Two are a result of the equilibrium of Week One thus shifting its position.

Timlin concluded with five main implications of her research on the Keynesian system. First, the structure of the interest rate complex is equally or even more important as the average level of interest rates to maintaining the employment level equilibrium. Second, economic activity can be hindered by both high and low interest rate levels. Third, human psychology and its unstable nature will limit the chance of reaching a stable equilibrium; high unemployment levels and low levels of interest could persist at the same time and indefinitely. Fourth, the movement of money between active and inactive balances creates business cycles, even though the amount of money is given. Lastly, unemployment is likely to be persistent in a monetary economy. Timlin’s work had significant policy implications within Canada. She highlighted the importance of economic theory in creating policy, and deduced Keynesian economics to the Liberal Party of Canada.

=== Monetary policy ===
After her extensive work on Keynesian economics, Timlin devoted the rest of her research career to monetary and immigration policy within Canada. Her research on Canadian monetary policy surrounded the post World War II era, where she critiqued the Bank of Canada’s failure to employ Keynesian countercyclical stabilization policies during the inflation period of the Korean War. Her paper titled "Recent Developments in Canadian Monetary Policy" indicated that expansionist policies undertaken by the Bank of Canada would have been more reasonable had the effects of increasing external prices and outputs on bank deposits and reserves been delayed until the inflation had resolved itself.

Similarly, in Timlin’s paper Monetary Stabilization Policies and Keynesian Theory, she indicates that following WWII, the rate of investment should have been limited through increased yield flexibility on the securities flowing into the central banks’ portfolios.

=== Immigration policy ===
Timlin published three main papers on Canadian immigration: "Economic Theory and Immigration Policy" (published in the Canadian Journal of Economics and Political Science), "Does Canada Need More People?" (published in Oxford University Press) and "Canada's Immigration Policy, 1896-1920" (published in CJEPS). In "Economic Theory and Immigration Policy" she conveyed that economic theory can only get policymakers so far in formulating immigration policy and examining the direct effects of migration; quantitative analysis is required to identify patterns and deduce proper results. In her second paper, "Does Canada Need More People?", Timlin examines both the effects of external and internal conditions on Canada’s ability to admit immigrants. Timlin studied the short and long run absorptive capacity of Canada and argued that the extent to which the effects of a growing population will be felt will depend on Canada’s external economic relationships with the rest of the world. She concluded the paper by emphasizing the importance of all nations selecting immigration policies that improve resource allocation for the whole world; a system of free migration with large-scale international trade is essential for economic development and maximizing efficiency within economies.

Timlin’s third paper on immigration policy, Canada’s Immigration policy, 1896-1920, examined the transition to the 1910 Immigration Act with particular interest on the attitudes expressed by the Minister of the Interior, Clifford Sifton, and Sir Wilfrid Laurier. Sifton believed that only agricultural immigrants were beneficial to the economy, and subsequently disapproved of Asian immigrants who did not settle on farmlands. Timlin addressed the racial tensions associated with immigration in this paper, and claimed that the prejudices were uncalled for, transmuting a labour question into a racial question.

== Honours and awards ==
- 1945-1956 Guggenheim Fellowship
- 1951 elected to the Royal Society of Canada
- 1959-1960 Canada Council Special Senior Fellowship
- 1967 Canada's Centennial Medal
- 1969 named an Honorary Degree of Doctor of Laws by the University of Saskatchewan
- 1976 named to the Order of Canada

== Positions held ==
- 1941-1943 Member, Canadian Political Science Association
- 1950-1951 Consultant, Federal Commission on Prices
- 1952 Consultant, Royal Commission for the Saskatchewan River Development
- 1953-1955 Vice President, Canadian Political Science Association
- 1957-1960 Member, Executive Committee, American Economics Association
- 1959-1960 President, Canadian Political Science Association

== Selected works ==
- Timlin, Mabel. Keynesian Economics. Toronto: University of Toronto Press: 1942. Reprint with biographical note by A. E. Safarian and an introduction by L. Tarshis, Toronto: McClelland and Stewart, Carelton Library no. 107: 1977
- Timlin, Mabel. "General Equilibrium Analysis and Public Policy." Canadian Journal of Economics and Political Science 12(4), November 1946: 483-9
- Timlin, Mabel. "Economic Theory and Immigration Policy." American Economic Review 43(2), May 1953: 42-53
- Timlin, Mabel. "Monetary Stabilization Policies and Keynesian Theory." In Post-Keynesian Economics, edited by K. K. Kurihara, 59-88. London: George Allen and Unwin, 1955
- Timlin, Mabel. "Canada's Immigration Policy, 1896-1910". Canadian Journal of Economics and Political Science 26(40), November 1960: 517-32
