= Reeta Chowdhari Tremblay =

Canadian political scientist

- Born: 1950 (age 75–76); Jammu and Kashmir, India
- Title: Vice President (Academic) of Memorial University (2009–2010); Provost of the University of Victoria (2011–2014)

Academic background
- Education: University of Kashmir; Jawaharlal Nehru University; University of Chicago
- Thesis: State-Centered Policy Analysis in India (1990)

Academic work
- Discipline: Political science
- Sub-discipline: Comparative politics
- Institutions: Concordia University; Memorial University; University of Victoria

Reeta Chowdhari Tremblay (born 1950) is a Canadian political scientist and former senior academic administrator. She is an internationally recognized expert on Kashmir and India-Pakistan.

== Biography ==
Tremblay is Professor Emerita of Comparative Politics in the Department of Political Science at the University of Victoria, British Columbia. She was born in Jammu and Kashmir, India, obtained an MPhil from Jawaharlal Nehru University, New Delhi, and MA and PhD from the University of Chicago (1990). She is among the 50 prominent Indo-Canadians whose biographies appear in the Indian diaspora publication the A-List.

== Work ==
Her writings on Kashmir and India–Pakistan relations, a subject on which she is considered to be a leading North American expert, are widely reviewed and cited. Her research deals with secessionist movements (Kashmir) in South Asia, identity-based politics, secessionist movements, the politics of subaltern resistance and accommodation in post-colonial societies, democracy and governance, primarily in the South Asian context. She has authored or co-authored eight books and over 60 articles and reviews.

Tremblay has held senior academic administrative positions in Canada: Vice-President Academic and Provost at the University of Victoria, Vice-President (Academic) and Pro-Vice-Chancellor (pro tempore) at Memorial University of Newfoundland; earlier, she was Dean of the Faculty of Arts at Memorial University, and Chair of the Department of Political Science at Concordia University, Montreal which she is credited with having re-built and raised to the ranks of the stronger such departments in Canada. While at Memorial University, she helped found what has become the highly successful SPARKS Literary Festival with noted Canadian poet Mary Dalton in 2009.

She is past president of the Canadian Political Science Association (CPSA), of the Canadian Asian Studies Association (CASA), and the former Canadian Council Area Studies Learned Societies (CCASLS). She has also been on editorial boards of PS: Political Science & Politics American Political Science Association, Pacific Affairs, Canadian Journal of Law and Society and Politics and Governance.

Tremblay is associated with the Centre d’études et de recherche sur l'Inde, l'Asie du Sud et sa diaspora (CERIAS) at the Université du Québec à Montréal, is a CAPI Associate at the Centre for Asia-Pacific Initiatives, an associate fellow at the University of Victoria Centre for Studies in Religion and Society, a founding member of the Global South Asia Forum at the University of Victoria and a non-resident fellow at the Society for Policy Studies (SPS), New Delhi. During the 2016 and 2017 summer terms, she was a visiting scholar at SOAS (School of Oriental and African Studies), University of London.In 2015, she was a visiting fellow at the Netherlands Institute for Advanced Study at Wassenaar.

== Selected bibliography ==
- "India: Federalism, Majoritarian Nationalism, and the Vulnerable and Marginalized", with Namitha George in Victor V. Ramraj ed."Covid-19 in Asia : Law and Policy Contexts Law and Policy Contexts" Oxford University Press, 2021; 173-188
- "Religion and Politics in Jammu and Kashmir" Edited with Mohita Bhatia, Routledge India (2020). ()
- Modi's Foreign Policy, (with Ashok Kapur), Sage Publications, (2017). (Review)
- "Contested Governance, Competing Nationalisms, and Disenchanted Publics: Kashmir beyond Intractability?" in Chitralekhas Zutshi (ed) Kashmir: History, Politics, and Representation, Cambridge University Press, 2017. (Review)
- "Beyond Parochialism and Domestic Preoccupation: the current state of comparative politics in Canada", Canadian Journal of Political Science, Vol. 45, Issue 4, 2012; pp. 741–756.
- "Kashmir's Secessionist Movement Resurfaces: Ethnic Identity, Community Competition, and the State", Asian Survey, Vol. 49, No. 6, 2009; pp. 924–950.
- "Institutional Causes of Indo-Pakistani Rivalry" with Julian Schofield, in T.V. Paul (ed), The Indian Pakistan Conflict: An Enduring Rivalry, Cambridge University Press, 2005, pp. 225–250.
- "Inclusive Administration: Feminist Critiques of Bureaucracy" in Keith Henderson and O.P. Dwivedi (ed), Bureaucracy and Alternatives in World Perspectives, MacMillan Press, 1999, pp. 69–94.
- "Nation, Identity and the Intervening Role of the State: A Study of the Secessionist Movement in Kashmir", Pacific Affairs, Vol. 69, No.4, winter 1996-97,1997, pp. 471–498.
- "Representation of Self and Society in Bombay Cinema", Contemporary South Asia, Vol 5 No.3 October 1996, pp. 295–308.
- "Kashmir: The Valley's Political Dynamics", Contemporary South Asia, Vol. 4, No. 1 (Kashmir Special Issue), March, 1995, pp. 79–101.

Professional and academic associations
Preceded by Graham White	President of the Canadian Political Science Association; 2011–2012	Succeeded by Michael Atkinson
