= Yasmeen Abu-Laban =

Canadian political scientist

Academic background
- Education: University of Alberta (BA); Carleton University (MA, PhD)
- Thesis: The nation-state in an era of regionalism and globalization; a comparative study of the politics of migration in the United States and France. (1996)

Academic work
- Institutions: University of Alberta
- Website: www.yasmeenabulaban.com

Yasmeen M. Abu-Laban is a professor and Tier 1 Canada Research Chair in the Department of Political Science at the University of Alberta. She is a Fellow at the Canadian Institute for Advanced Research. Abu-Laban's research focus is multiculturalism, human rights, racism, and immigration policies and politics.

== Education ==
Abu-Laban completed a bachelor of arts (1988) in political science at the University of Alberta before earning her master's degree (1990) and PhD (1996) in political science from Carleton University.

== Career ==
Abu-Laban received the Notely Postdoctoral Fellow grant in 1996 and named assistant professor at the University of Alberta in 1998. She was named full professor in 2008 and Canada Research Chair in the Politics of Citizenship and Human Rights in 2018. In 2019, she was named Fellow of the Canadian Institute for Advanced Research.

Abu-Laban has been a visiting scholar at Concordia University and University of Toronto, as well as a sabbatical affiliation scholar at Queen's University. Abu-Laban is also a member of Toronto Metropolitan University's Bridging Divides research program.

Abu-Laban is a board member of the Centre for Constitutional Studies. She has served as president of the Canadian Political Science Association from 2016 to 2017 and vice-president of the International Political Science Association from 2018 to 2021. In 2022, she was elected president of the Canadian Ethnic Studies Association.

== Select works ==
=== Articles ===
- Abu-Laban, Yasmeen (2024). "Middle class nation building through a tenacious discourse on skills: Immigration and Canada". Journal of Ethnic and Migration Studies. 50 (7): 1803–1821. doi:10.1080/1369183X.2024.2315357.
- Bakan, Abigail B.; Abu-Laban, Yasmeen (2024). "Anti-Palestinian racism, antisemitism, and solidarity: Considerations towards an analytic of praxis". Studies in Political Economy / Recherches en Économie Politique. 105: 107–122. doi:10.1080/07078552.2024.2325300.
- Abu-Laban, Yasmeen; Bakan, Abigail B. (2022). "Anti-Palestinian Racism and Racial Gaslighting". The Political Quarterly. 93 (3): 508–516. doi:10.1111/1467-923X.13166.

=== Books ===
- Abu-Laban, Yasmeen; Frishkopf, Michael; Hasmath, Reza; Kirova, Anna, eds. (2024). Resisting the Dehumanization of Refugees. Athabasca University Press. ISBN 9781771994101.
- Abu-Laban, Yasmeen; Tungohan, Ethel; Gabriel, Christina (2022). Containing Diversity: Canada and the Politics of Immigration in the 21st Century. University of Toronto Press. ISBN 9781442609044.
- Abu-Laban, Yasmeen; Bakan, Abigail B. (2019). Israel, Palestine and the Politics of Race. Bloomsbury. ISBN 9781780765327.
