= Leaders' debate on women's issues during the 1984 Canadian federal election campaign =

1984 debate

On August 15, 1984, for the first time there was a televised debate on women's issues among the leaders of the three major political parties during the campaign leading up to the Sept. 4 Canadian federal election. During the same election campaign, there had been two previous television debates in July on general campaign issues.

== Format of the debate ==
The two-hour bilingual debate, organized by the National Action Committee on the Status of Women, took place at the Royal York Hotel in Toronto among Prime Minister John Turner (Liberal party), Conservative party leader Brian Mulroney, and Edward Broadbent of the New Democratic Party. Panelists were Eleanor Wachtel, a Vancouver freelance writer, Kay Sigurjonsson, an NAC founding member and director of the Federation of Women Teachers' Associations of Ontario, Francine Harel-Giasson, a professor at the University of Montreal business school, and Renée Rowan, columnist for Le Devoir, and the moderator of the debate was Caroline Andrew, chairman of the political science department at the University of Ottawa. The debate was jointly broadcast by four TV networks: CBC, Radio-Canada, CTV and Global.

The debate consisted of separate confrontations involving only two leaders at a time, therefore not all candidates were asked to address every issue. The leaders made opening statements in French and closing statements in English. The first 30 minutes were almost entirely in French.

== The issues ==
=== Inequality ===
All three leaders expressed commitment to improving the equality of women in social and economic spheres. All three promised action with regard to pensions for women outside the labour force and equal pay for work of equal value, mainly by better enforcement of existing rules. Mulroney promised pensions for homemakers, a plan which Turner criticized and claimed would cost as much as $900 million a year. Broadbent promised $50 million for shelters for battered wives. Turner promised $9.7 million in the following year for women to take training courses.

Turner and Broadbent battled over whether the federal government could or should enforce equal pay for work of equal value in businesses regulated by the provinces. Turner promised mandatory affirmative-action programs in the public and private sector under federal jurisdiction. Mulroney and Broadbent both said they would force companies doing business with the federal government to institute equal pay.

Broadbent asked Mulroney whether he would require banks to set aside specific amounts of money for loans to women for small businesses. Mulroney said he would rely on persuasion.

=== Day care ===
A non-partisan group had proposed a day-care plan that would cost $300 million in the first year, a proposal which was accepted by Broadbent. Turner proposed an increase in the maximum deduction for child care from $8000 to $12,000, which "shocked" the lobby group because the party's earlier written reply to their questionnaire had said that such tax deductions are of the greatest value to high income groups, and often remain unclaimed by those eligible. Mulroney promised to study the day-care question. Broadbent criticized the Liberal party for taking refuge in the fact that child care is a provincial jurisdiction, saying that this is the same argument that was used in the 60's about a universal health care insurance system.

=== The arms race ===
Peace was considered to be a women's issue. Prime Minister Turner had been continuing the peace initiative started by former Prime Minister Pierre Trudeau by writing to world leaders, among them Soviet Communist Party leader Konstantin Chernenko and United Nations Secretary-General Javier Pérez de Cuéllar.

=== Abortion ===
Broadbent appeared to go further than the other leaders in advocating freedom of choice. Turner stated that there were two irreconcilable points of view on the abortion issue, and that while the contemporary law didn't satisfy everyone, there was no viable alternative to it. Turner argued that provincial governments should make legal abortions equally available to all women, and was said by an abortion activist to be the first Prime Minister to promise equal access to abortion across the country. Mulroney was not asked to discuss this issue during this debate.

=== Other issues ===
Other issues mentioned included pornography.

=== Trust ===
The last question in the debate, posed by Kay Sigurjonsson, was "Why should we trust you now?" Turner criticized the Conservative party, citing a poll at a 1982 policy conference as showing 74 percent opposing increased funding for day-care and 75 percent opposed to affirmative action programs. Time ran out before the leaders could finish answering this question.

== Reaction to the debate ==
Chaviva Hosek, president of the NAC, said the debate was "a large step forward in political terms for women's issues". She said that the three leaders were more aware of the issues than they had been previously and that women would not forget their promises. "It was a victory in the sense that two hours of prime time television talking about women's questions is really important," said Caroline Andrew, moderator of the debate.

Outside the room where the debate was being held, about 45 members of REAL Women demonstrated, saying that the NAC does not represent them or the majority of women in Canada.

An article in Maclean's states that Broadbent was widely judged to be the winner of the debate for his handling of the issues, and he was applauded during the debate, was supported by a strong majority of a group of 400 women who gathered at Algonquin College to watch the debate on television, and was said to have come out a clear winner by Doris Anderson, past president of the NAC. However, only Turner and Mulroney were believed to have a reasonable chance of winning the election, and between those two, the article in Maclean's stated that Turner came out ahead, by making more specific promises, some mentioning specific amounts of money. According to Florence Irvine, past president of the Federation of Women Teachers' Associations of Ontario, Mulroney came out on top. The presidents of two major women's groups in Quebec chose Broadbent and Mulroney as winners.

All three leaders were criticized by the media for sounding too much alike and for failing to interest viewers: "neither Turner, Tory leader Brian Mulroney nor New Democratic Party leader Ed Broadbent broke any new ground on women’s issues during the lacklustre debate…They concentrated, instead, on avoiding mistakes." However, the press did give credit to the NAC and the debate for putting women’s issues in the political spotlight. Ronald Anderson of The Globe and Mail claimed the event was significant to the position of the Canadian feminist movement: "The television debate on women's issues this week indicates how far the women's movement has come in its emergence as a political force in Canada."

== See also ==
- Women's rights in Canada
