= Denis Stairs (political scientist) =

Denis W. Stairs OC FRSC is professor emeritus in political science at Dalhousie University.

== Education and academics ==
Denis Stairs obtained a B.A. in history from Dalhousie University in 1961. He went on to get his second B.A. from Oxford in 1964, this time in philosophy, politics and economics. He completed his Ph.D. in political science at the University of Toronto, where he specialized in international politics and foreign policy.

Stairs joined Dalhousie’s Department of Political Science in 1966, and was the founding director of its Centre for Foreign Policy Studies from 1970 to 1975. He served as chair of his department from 1980 to 1985, and as Dalhousie’s vice-president (academic and research) from 1988 to 1993. In 2005 he was appointed Professor Emeritus.

Stairs specializes in Canadian foreign and defence policy, and Canada–U.S. relations.

== Other work ==
Dr. Stairs was elected a fellow of the Royal Society of Canada in 1979. He is the former President of the Canadian Political Science Association, a member of the Social Sciences and Humanities Research Council of Canada from 1981 to 1987 and of the Research Council of the Canadian Institute for Advanced Research from 1986 to 1997. He served on the board of directors of the Institute for Research on Public Policy from 1989 to 1997, and again from 1998 to 2006.

He was appointed to the board of visitors of the Canadian Forces College upon its creation in 2002, he was its chair from 2006 to 2009. In 2002 he became a member of the advisory council of the Canadian Defence and Foreign Affairs Institute, and has been the chair since 2008 as well as being appointed a senior research fellow at the institute in the same year. He has been a member of the board of directors of the Pearson Peacekeeping Centre since 2007.

Stairs is a two-time recipient of the Marcel Cadieux Distinguished Writing Award. In 2004 he received a Distinguished Scholar Award from the International Studies Association and in 2006 he was appointed an Officer of the Order of Canada.
