= University of Ottawa Faculty of Social Sciences =

Faculty of the University of Ottawa, Canada

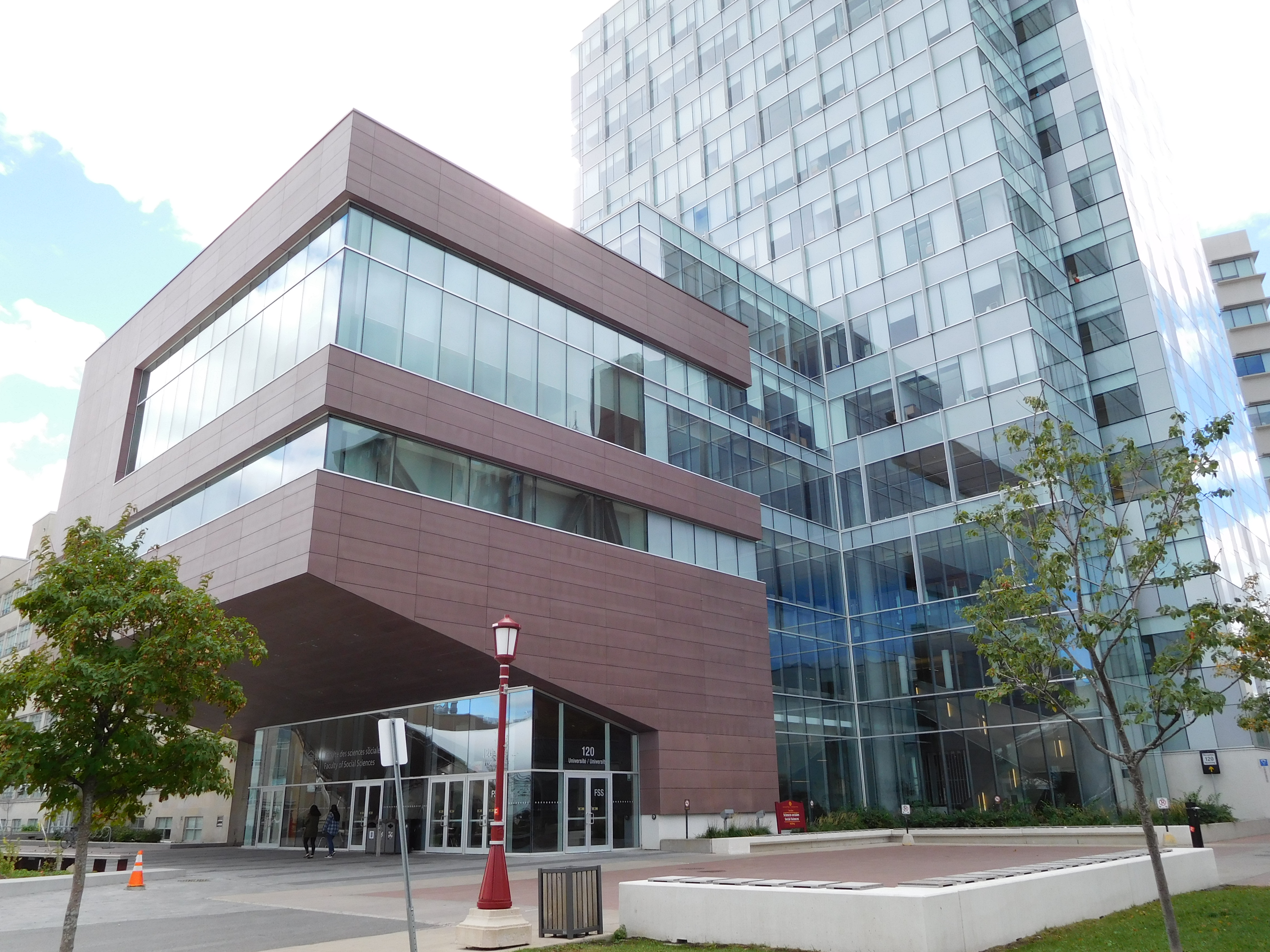
- Established: 1936; 90 years ago
- Parent institution: University of Ottawa
- Dean: Nathan Young
- Students: ~10,000
- Location: Ottawa, Ontario, Canada
- Website: uottawa.ca/faculty-social-sciences/

The Faculty of Social Sciences is a bilingual faculty within the University of Ottawa. The faculty was founded in 1936 as the School of Political Sciences, and was officially named the Faculty of Social Sciences in 1955. The faculty consists of nine departments, schools and institutes that offer undergraduate, masters, and doctoral programs in both of the University's official languages.

Currently there are 10,000 students enrolled, making it the largest faculty at the university. The faculty also employs 260 full-time professors and 100 staff.

== History ==
The Faculty of Social Sciences was first established in 1936 as the School of Political Science, and later incorporated the Institute of Psychology (Faculty of Arts) in 1941. In 1955, the Faculty of Social Sciences acquired its faculty status and added the Department of Economics, the Department of Sociology, and the Department of Political Science, with the Department of Criminology being added in 1968. The Schools of Psychology and Social Work were added to the faculty in the late 1970s and early 1990s, and in 1999 the Institute for Women's Studies was established.

In 2007, the Graduate School of Public and International Affairs was created, offering a bilingual, multidisciplinary curriculum for students wishing to pursue a career in the fields of public policy, international affairs, and international development. In 2008, the School of International Development and Global Studies was established. The School is Canada’s largest academic unit specializing in international development, and promotes theory of international development that relates to the minimization of inequality, peaceful resolution of conflicts, and a respect for diversity and an appreciation for citizen engagement.

== Academic Units and Programs ==
The faculty consists of 9 schools, departments and institutes, offering some 30 different programs at the undergraduate, masters, and doctoral level.

The faculty also offers CO-OP options for the following programs: anthropology, sociology, human rights, conflict studies, economics, political science, international development and globalization, public policy, and public administration. The University of Ottawa's CO-OP program allows students to apply concepts learned in class to practical work-terms, totaling 16 months of paid work-experience. Many students in the Faculty of Social Sciences who participate in the CO-OP program are employed by the Government of Canada.

All honours programs within the faculty allow students to participate in international internships, field research, or international exchanges. The faculty has 280 partner institutions in 55 countries, and provides students with mobility bursaries to ease the cost of international exchanges.

== Facility ==
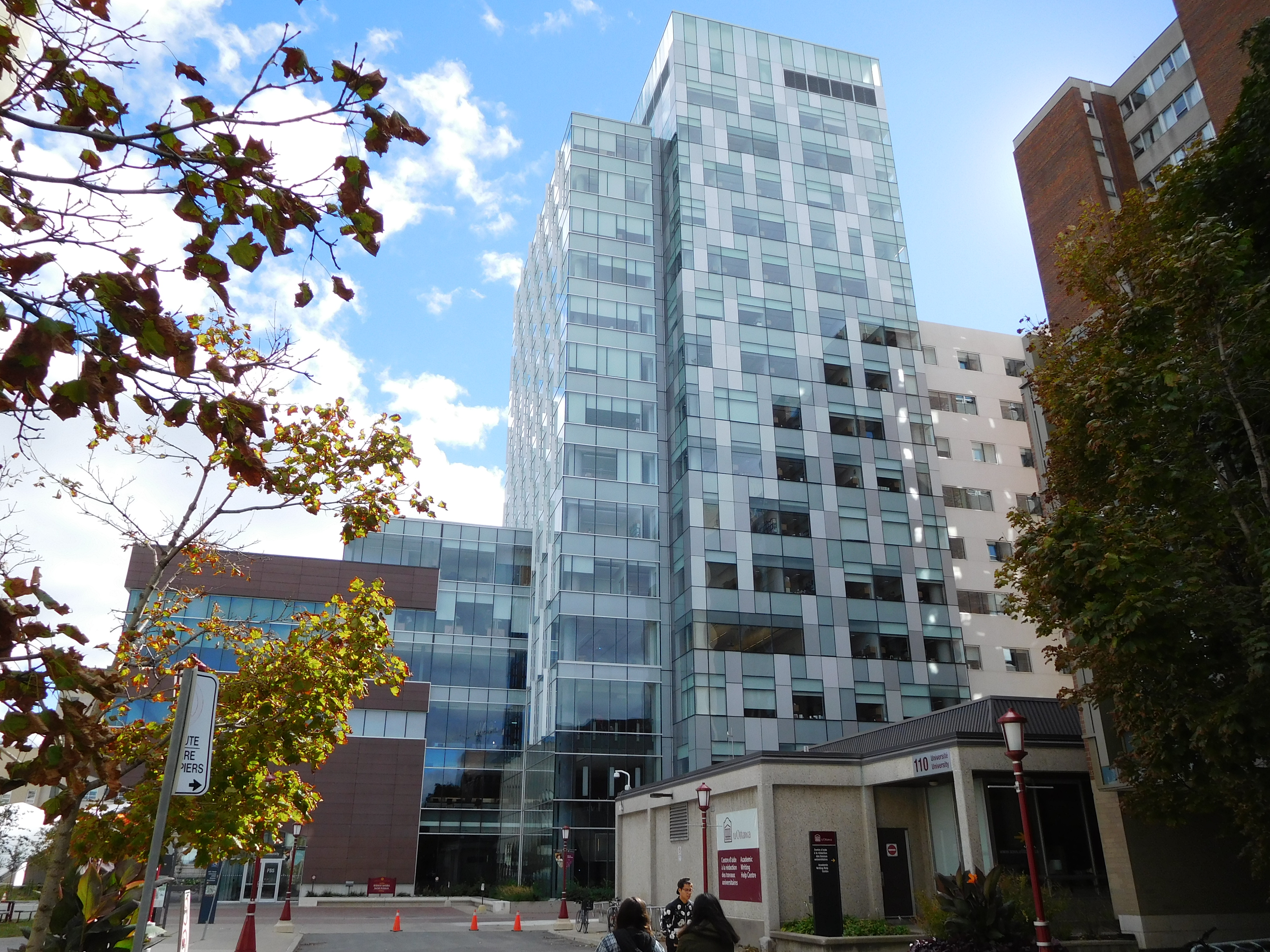
Faculty of Social Sciences building, completed in 2012.

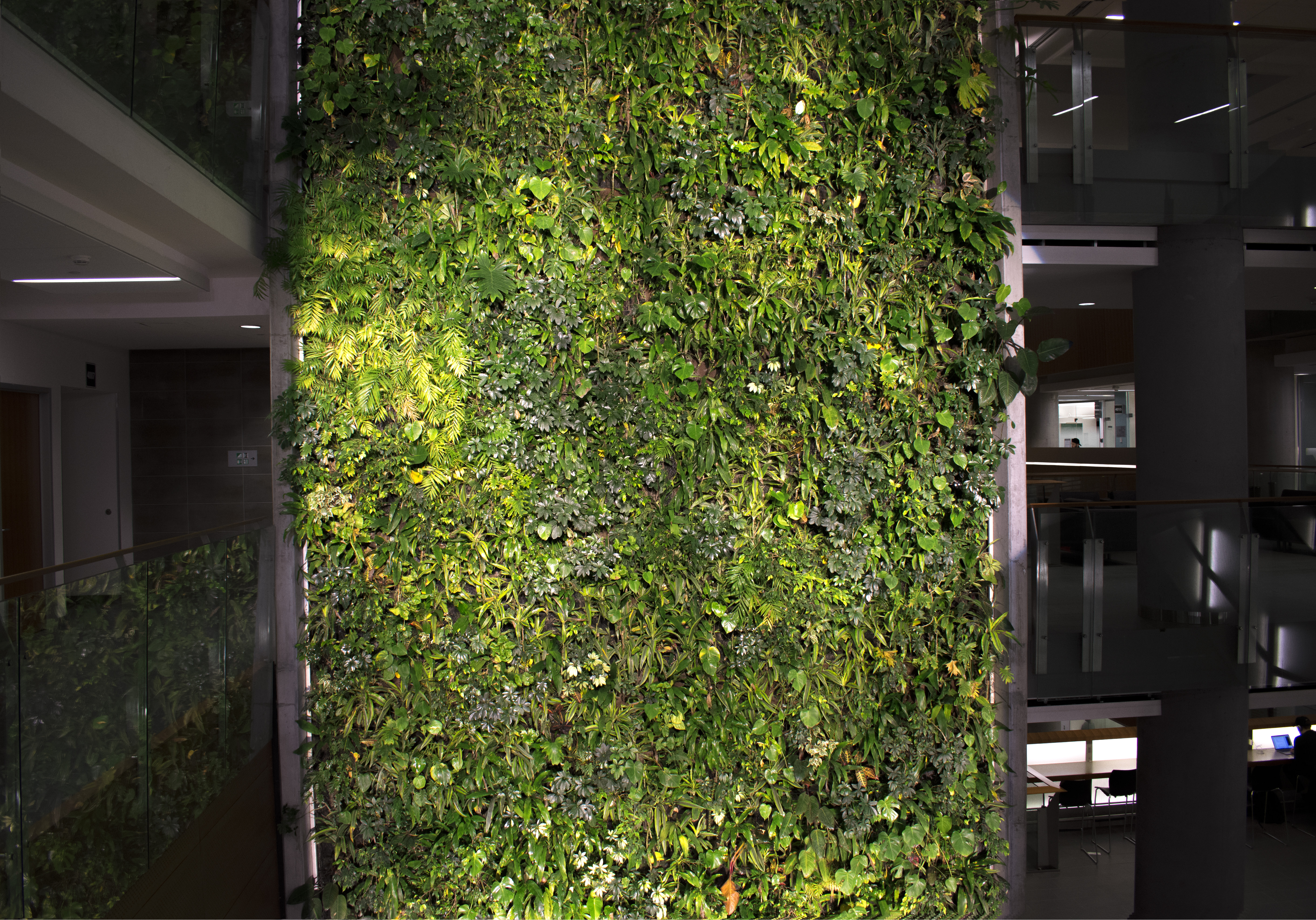
Interior plant wall in the Faculty of Social Sciences building.

In 2012, the faculty was united under one roof when construction on the Faculty of Social Sciences (FSS) building was finished. With 15 stories, and a surface area of 25,299 square meters, the building includes new classrooms, meeting rooms, and an atrium with a six-story living wall that serves as an air-filtration system. The building includes several sustainable features, such as recycled construction materials, efficient heat redistribution, proximity to public transport, and energy efficiency. The building has received the Award of Excellence at the Green Roofs for Healthy Cities conference in November 2013, and the Interior Wood Design Award from the Ontario Wood Works! program of the Canadian Wood Council.

== Research ==
The faculty maintains several research centres and institutes for meetings and discussions, supported jointly by the Vice-President for Research and the Faculty. They operate under a defined research strategy.

=== Research centres ===
- Centre for Interdisciplinary Research on Citizenship and Minorities (CIRCEM)
- Centre for International Policy Studies (CIPS)
- Centre for Public Management and Policy
- Centre for Research on Educational and Community Service (CRECS)
- Centre on Governance (COG)
- Human Rights Research and Education Centre (affiliation)
- Interdisciplinary Centre for Black Health
- Research Centre on the Future of Cities

=== Research institutes ===
- Institute of the Environment
- Institute of Feminist and Gender Studies
- Institute for Science, Society and Policy
