= Crime Prevention Ottawa =

Crime Prevention Ottawa (CPO) was a city-funded municipal board which upholds the mission to reduce crime and enhance community safety in the city of Ottawa through collaborative and evidence-based crime prevention. CPO maintained the vision that Ottawa is a community in which individuals, families, and neighbourhoods are safe and feel safe.

== History ==
CPO was founded by the City of Ottawa in 2005 in response to the need for a permanent crime prevention responsibility center as outlined in the 2004 report Community Crime Prevention: Investing for a Safer Ottawa. CPO united key stakeholders and community members throughout the city. CPO was a partnership of the City of Ottawa, Ottawa Police Service, United Way/Centraide Ottawa, Children's Aid Society of Ottawa, Ottawa Community Housing, the area's four school boards, and other key community stakeholders.

On July 12, 2023, Ottawa city council approved a preposed merge of Crime Prevention Ottawa and the Community Safety and Well-Being Plan since most of their mandates overlapped.

== Initiatives ==
CPO was involved in various projects and initiatives regarding gender-based violence, reducing crime in high-risk neighbourhoods, and working with youth in high-risk environments. For example, in terms of high-risk neighbourhoods, CPO funded and supported several Ottawa communities with positive results, such as Together for Vanier; Lowertown, Our Home; Vision Jasmine; United Neighbours; and Cedarwood. Recent work with Vision Jasmine – a neighbourhood that witnessed three homicides in three years – has resulted in a drastic reduction in crime rates. Other projects include the Paint It Up! graffiti program, the Ottawa Child and Youth Initiative (OCYI) homework club community of practice, and the Home Takeovers project. Paint It Up! is a graffiti management program that engages and empowers youth through community art and uses the 4E model: Eradication, Empowerment, Education, and Enforcement. Since Paint It Up! began in 2010, over 60 mural projects have been constructed in the city of Ottawa. The OCYI homework club community of practice unites frontline staff, managers and volunteers working in after school and homework clubs to communicate and share tools and resources available in the community. Home Takeovers, a term CPO coined, refers to situations when a friend or family member enter a tenant's home and refuse to leave, causing the tenant to feel physically, financially, or emotionally unsafe. CPO has published videos to identify the various different situations that Home Takeovers can occur. These videos also provide information on what to do if someone is experiencing a takeover. Current priorities for CPO include The Ottawa Street Violence and Gang Strategy, Youth at Risk, Neighbourhoods, Gender-Based Violence, Emerging Issues, General Issues, and Administrative Operations. CPO supports and shares evidence-based research pertaining to the above listed topics and emerging safety issues in Ottawa.
