= Gender and politics =

Academic subfield

Gender and politics, also called gender in politics, is a field of study in political science and gender studies that aims to understand the relationship between peoples' genders and phenomena in politics. Researchers of gender and politics study how peoples' political participation and experiences interact with their gender identity, and how ideas of gender shape political institutions and decision-making. Women's political participation in the context of patriarchal political systems is a particular focus of study. Gender and politics is an interdisciplinary field, drawing not just from political science and gender studies but also related fields such as feminist political thought, and peoples' gendered treatment is commonly seen as intersectionally linked to their entire social identity.

== Scope and context ==
=== Overview ===
The study of gender and politics is concerned with how peoples' gender structures their participation in and experience of political events, and how political institutions are encoded with gendered ideas. This study exists in the context that, historically and across countries, gender has been a core determinant of how resources are distributed, how policies are set, and who participates in political decision-making. Because of the breadth covered by the subfield, it spans numerous areas of study in politics such as international relations, comparative politics, political philosophy, and public policy, and it draws from and builds on ideas in feminist political theory like intersectionality and modern conceptions of gender. The study of gender and politics overlaps with the study of how other components of peoples' social identities interact with their political participation and experiences, with researchers particularly emphasizing that the interaction of gender and politics is intersectional and dependent on factors like peoples' race, class, and gender expression.

The study of gender and politics may also be referred to as "gender in politics", and is closely related to the study of "women and politics" or "women in politics", which may also be used synecdochically to refer to the connection between gender and politics.

=== Women and politics ===
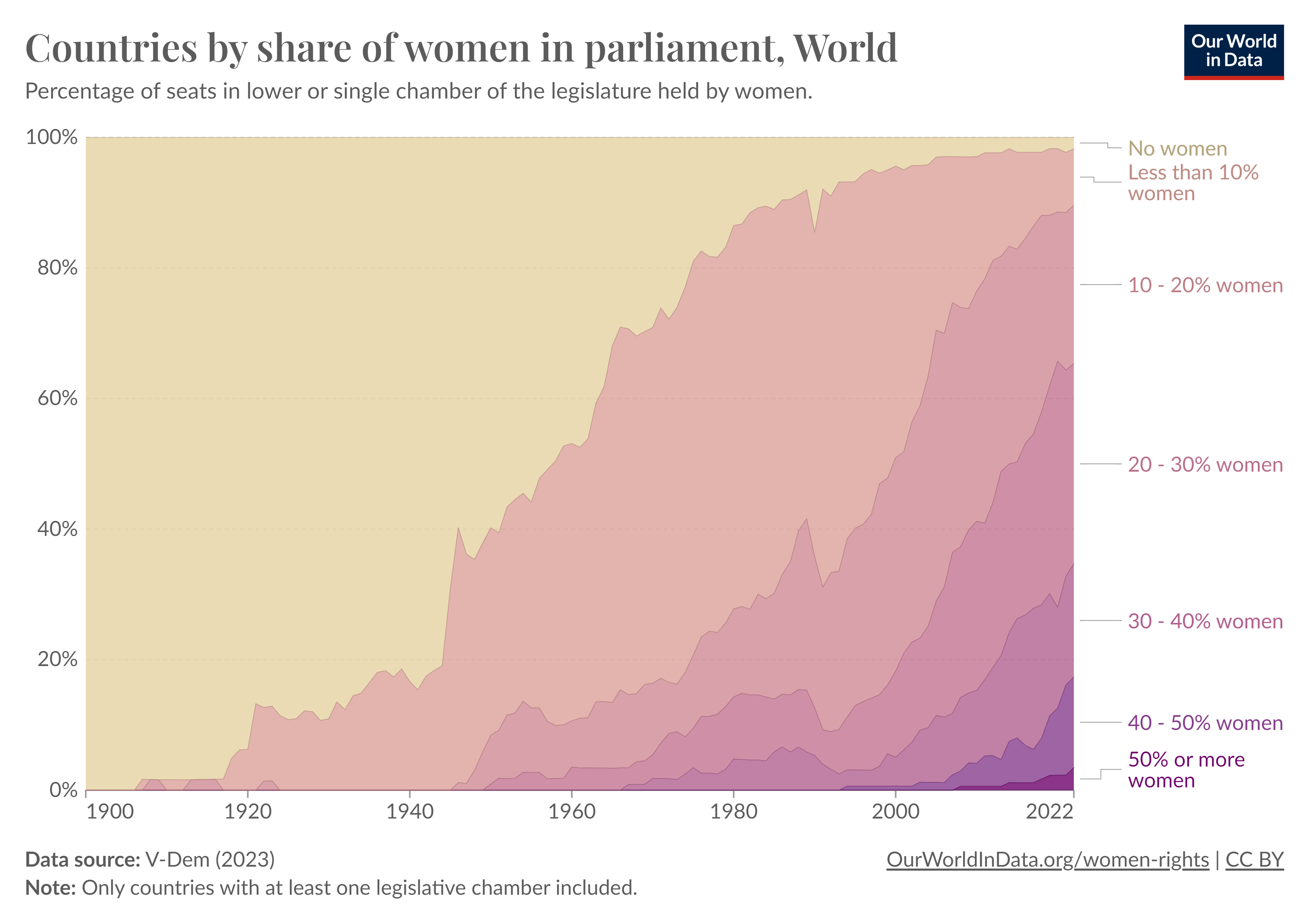
Countries by share of women in parliament

A central concern in the study of gender and politics is the patriarchal exclusion of women from politics, which is a common but not universal theme historically and across cultures. As the involvement of women in public affairs increased across many societies during the 20th and 21st centuries, academic attention was also increasingly focused on the changing role of women in politics. For example, a common topic in the study of gender and politics is the participation of women as politicians, voters, and activists in a particular country. Since that participation exists in some political context, many scholars of gender and politics also study the political mechanisms that either enable or suppress women's participation in politics; women's social participation may increase or decrease as a result of political institutions, government policies, or social events. Another common topic of study is the impact on women of particular social policies, such as debates over women's rights, reproductive rights, women in government quotas, and policies on violence against women.

Gender and politics researchers have also analyzed the position of women in the discipline of political science, which has mirrored the broader societal trend of increasing inclusion and participation of women beginning in the second half of the 20th century.

== Works and institutions ==
Gender and politics is the focus of the journals Politics & Gender and the European Journal of Politics and Gender. Gender and politics is also the title of a book series, Gender and Politics, which launched in 2012 and published dozens of volumes over the next several years.

There are a number of institutes and centers devoted to the study of gender and politics. The Center for American Women and Politics in the Eagleton Institute of Politics at Rutgers University is dedicated to the study of women's political participation in the United States. Other examples include the Women & Politics Institute at American University, which seeks "to close the gender gap in political leadership" by providing relevant academic training to young women, and the Center for Women in Politics and Public Policy at the University of Massachusetts Boston which has a similar mandate.

== See also ==
- Anti-gender movement – International movement opposed to the concept of gender identity
- Gender empowerment – Empowerment of people of any gender
  - Gender Empowerment Measure (GEM)
- Gender essentialism – Attribution of intrinsic qualities to women and men
- Identity politics – Politics based on one's identity
- Patriarchy – Social system with male rule
- Sexism in American political elections
- Sociology of gender – Branch of the discipline of sociology
