= Grace Skogstad =

Canadian political scientist

Grace Skogstad is a Canadian political scientist and professor at the University of Toronto. and a cross-appointed affiliate faculty in the Munk School of Global Affairs and Public Policy at the University of Toronto.

== Education and career ==
Grace Skogstad holds a BA (Hons) and MA from the University of Alberta, and a PhD in political science from the University of British Columbia. Prior to joining the University of Toronto in 1986, she was a Killam Postdoctoral Fellow at Dalhousie University, an associate professor of political science at St. Francis Xavier University in Antigonish, Nova Scotia, and a visiting associate professor in the School of Public Administration at Carleton University, Ottawa. At the University of Toronto, she directed the Transatlantic Master’s Program in Public Policy and the Global Economy (1997-2001) and served as chair of the Department of Political Science at the University of Toronto Scarborough (2012–2020).

She has served on editorial advisory boards for Cambridge University Press (Studies in Comparative Public Policy Series), the University of Toronto Press (Comparative Political Economy and Public Policy series), the Canadian Journal of Political Science, Canadian Political Science Review, Policy Sciences, and Policy and Society.

Grace Skogstad is known for serving as a consultant to the Government of Ontario, the Government of Canada, the Canadian Centre for Management Development, the Canadian Human Rights Commission, the Science Council of Canada, and the Council of Canadian Academies, and has prepared briefs for a number of Canadian policy institutes.

She has been an active participant in several international Conferences on Public Policy, as a panelist and recognized international scholar. In 2019 she was elected as President of the International Public Policy Association for two years.

== Research interests ==
Grace Skogstad is a specialist in Canadian politics and comparative public policy. Her research on Canadian politics has focused primarily on Canadian federalism and public policy-making. She is recognized as Canada’s foremost authority on the politics of agricultural policy-making in Canada. Her comparative public policy research has examined North American, European Union, and international policies with respect to genetically modified crops and foods, and biofuels. Her research has appeared in a number or books and international journals, including the Journal of European Integration, Journal of Comparative Policy Analysis, Policy Sciences, Biomass and Bioenergy, Publius: The Journal of Federalism, Journal of Common Market Studies, Journal of European Public Policy, the Australian Journal of Political Science, Global Governance journal, Journal of Public Policy and the Essential Readings in Canadian Government and Politics; and many others. Professor Skogstad has received research grants for her research from the Social Sciences and Humanities Research Council of Canada.

== Awards and honours ==
Grace Skogstad, in 2023, is the previous president of the International Public Policy Association.

She was President of the Canadian Political Science Association in 2002-2003. She received the Mildred A. Schwartz Lifetime Achievement Award from the American Political Science Association in August 2019. She was invited to give the Seagram Lecture at the McGill Institute for the Study of Canada, McGill University in May 2006. In 2007-2008, she held a Senior Fernand Braudel Fellowship at the European University Institute, Florence, Italy.

== Selected publications ==
Professor Skogstad has published ten books, and over 70 articles and book chapters. Her substantive areas of focus are North American and EU policies with respect to agriculture, genetically modified crops and foods, and, biofuels.

- Herman Bakvis and Grace Skogstad, eds. Canadian Federalism: Performance, Effectiveness and Legitimacy, 4th edition, University of Toronto Press, forthcoming 2020.
- Grace Skogstad, David Cameron, Martin Papillon, and Keith Banting, eds. The Global Promise of Federalism. Toronto: University of Toronto Press, 2013, 312 pp.
- Herman Bakvis and Grace Skogstad, eds. Canadian Federalism: Performance, Effectiveness and Legitimacy, 3rd edition, Oxford University Press, 2012, 378 pp.
- Grace Skogstad, ed. Policy Paradigms, Transnationalism, and Domestic Politics. Toronto: University of Toronto Press, 2011, 253 pp.
- Grace Skogstad and Amy Verdun, eds. The Common Agricultural Policy: Continuity and Change. Routledge, 2010, 169 pp.
- Internationalization and Canadian Agriculture: Policy and Governing Paradigms. University of Toronto Press, 2008, 373 pp.
- Herman Bakvis and Grace Skogstad, eds. Canadian Federalism: Performance, Effectiveness and Legitimacy, Second edition, Oxford University Press, 2008, 408 pp
- Grace Skogstad and Andrew Cooper, eds. Agricultural Trade: Domestic Pressures and International Tensions, Montreal: Institute for Research on Public Policy, 1990, 178 pp.
- William D. Coleman and Grace Skogstad, eds. Policy Communities and Public Policy in Canada, Toronto: Copp Clark Pitman, 1990, 338 pp.
- The Politics of Agricultural Policy-Making in Canada. Toronto: University of Toronto Press, 1987, 229 pp.
