= Studies in Political Economy =

Academic journal covering political economy

- Discipline: Political economy
- Language: English, French

Publication details
- History: 1979–present
- Publisher: Routledge
- Frequency: Triannual
- Open access: Hybrid

Standard abbreviations
- ISO 4: Stud. Political Econ.

Indexing
- ISSN: 0707-8552 (print); 1918-7033 (web)
- OCLC no.: 61124207

Links
- Journal homepage; Online access; Online archive

Studies in Political Economy (French: Recherches en économie politique) is a peer-reviewed academic journal covering political economy. Although an international journal, it has an emphasis on work concerning Canada. The journal publishes three times a year electronically and appears in print once a year. It is published by Routledge and was established in 1979. It is abstracted and indexed in PAIS International, The Left Index, Sociological Abstracts, Current Contents/Social and Behavioral Science, Human Resources Abstracts, Sage Public Administration Abstracts, Journal of Economic Literature, Canadian Periodical Index, and International Political Science Abstracts. It became bilingual in 2025.
