= Marcus Gee =

Canadian reporter and writer

Marcus Gee is an urban affairs columnist for The Globe and Mail, Canada's largest national daily newspaper, which he joined in 1991.

Gee was born in Toronto and graduated from the University of British Columbia in 1979 with a degree in modern European history. He has worked as a reporter for the Vancouver morning newspaper, The Province; as an editor, writer and correspondent for Asiaweek magazine; as a reporter for United Press International in Manila and Sydney; as a foreign affairs writer at Maclean's and as senior editor at The Financial Times of Canada. Gee also worked as an Asia-Pacific Business reporter from 2007 to 2009.

In 2002, Amnesty International gave him its annual John Humphrey award for human rights reporting. Among the events he has covered are the war in Kosovo, the violence in East Timor and the turmoil surrounding the overthrow of Indonesian President Suharto. In May 2020, Gee was the winner of the short feature category for the National Newspaper Awards. As of 2020, Gee has won three National Newspaper Awards for his writing.
