= Kim Richard Nossal =

Professor Kim Richard Nossal.

Kim Richard Nossal, PhD, FRSC, is a professor emeritus in the Department of Political Studies and the Centre for International and Defence Policy, Queen's University in Kingston, Ontario, Canada.

== Education and career ==
Born in London, England, Nossal was educated in Melbourne, Beijing, Toronto, and Hong Kong. He attended the University of Toronto, receiving his BA, MA, and PhD in 1977. In 1976 he joined the Department of Political Science at McMaster University in Hamilton, Ontario, where he taught international relations and Canadian foreign policy for 25 years, serving as chair of the Department from 1989 to 1990 and from 1992 to 1996 respectively. In 2001, he was appointed as head of the Department of Political Studies at Queen's, a position he held until 2009. He was the Sir Edward Peacock Professor of International Relations from 2008 to 2013. From January 2011 to December 2013 he was the director of the Centre for International and Defence Policy in the School of Policy Studies. From July 2013 until June 2015, he was the executive director of the School of Policy Studies. In 2018-2019 he served as director of the Centre for International and Defence Policy. He retired from Queen's University in 2020.

Nossal served as editor of International Journal (1992–1997), as the North American editor of Global Change, Peace & Security and served on the editorial boards of several scholarly journals, including Études Internationales, Revista Méxicana de Estudios Canadienses, and Civil Wars. He served as president of the Australian and New Zealand Studies Association of North America between 1999 and 2001, and president of the Canadian Political Science Association from 2005 to 2006. In 2000 Nossal was appointed by the Minister of National Defence to the academic selection committee of the Security and Defence Forum, the academic outreach program of the Department of National Defence; he was appointed the chair of the committee in 2005, remaining in this position until 2012, when DND terminated the program. In 2017, Nossal was awarded an honorary doctorate by the Royal Military College of Canada. In 2019, he was elected as a fellow of the Royal Society of Canada.

Nossal has authored several publications about Australian, Canadian and international politics in Foreign Affairs, The Interpreter, and the E-International Relations.

== Publications ==
- Ed., An Acceptance of Paradox: Essays on Canadian Diplomacy in Honour of John W. Holmes (1982)
- The Politics of Canadian Foreign Policy, 1st edition (1985)
- The Beijing Massacre: Australian Responses Australian Foreign Policy Papers (1993)
- Relocating Middle Powers: Australia and Canada in a Changing World Order (written with Andrew Cooper and Richard Higgott) (1993)
- Rain Dancing: Sanctions in Canadian and Australian Foreign Policy (1994)
- A Brief Madness: Australia and the Resumption of French Nuclear Testing Canberra Papers on Strategy and Defence 121 (written with Carolynn Vivian) (1997)
- The Politics of Canadian Foreign Policy, 3rd edition (1997)
- The Patterns of World Politics (1998)
- Diplomatic Departures: The Conservative Era in Canadian Foreign Policy, 1984-1993 (co-edited with Nelson Michaud) (2001)
- Politique internationale et défense au Canada et au Québec (written with Stéphane Roussel and Stéphane Paquin) (2007)
- Architects and Innovators: Building the Department of Foreign Affairs and International Trade, 1909-2009 (co-edited with Greg Donaghy) (2009)
- International Policy and Politics in Canada (written with Stéphane Roussel and Stéphane Paquin) (2011)
- The Politics of Canadian Foreign Policy, 4th edition (written with Stéphane Roussel and Stéphane Paquin) (2015)
- Charlie Foxtrot: Fixing Defence Procurement in Canada (2016)
- The Politics of War: Canada's Afghanistan Mission, 2001-14 (written with Jean-Christophe Boucher) (2017)
- Canada Alone: Navigating the Post-American World (2023)
