= Scarlett Point Lighthouse =

Lighthouse on Balaklava Island, British Columbia, Canada

Coordinates: 50°51′38″N 127°36′45″W

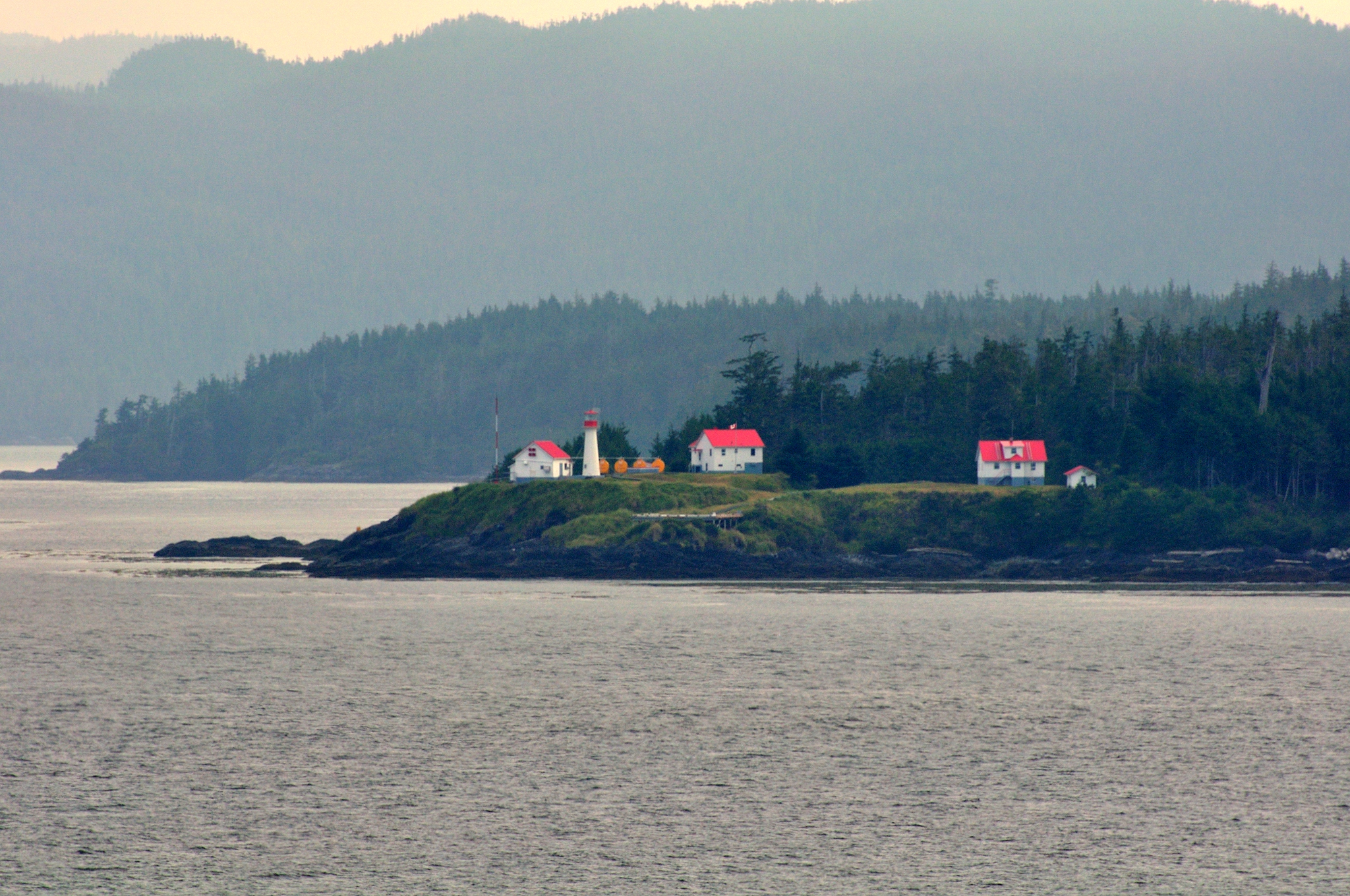
Scarlett Point (2009) photo taken by a passing ship

Scarlett Point Lighthouse is a lighthouse erected on the northeast side of Balaklava Island, known as Scarlett Point, about 15 km northwest of Port Hardy, in the Regional District of Mount Waddington, province of British Columbia, Canada. This lighthouse is managed by the Canadian Coast Guard.

== History ==
=== Construction ===
In 1905 a wooden lighthouse, with living quarters underneath the light, was built at Scarlett Point.

From the Annual Report of the Department of Marine for 1905: "A lighthouse was erected on Scarlett point, Balaklava island northwest point of the entrance to Christie passage, and was put in operation on April 12, 1905. The lighthouse stands 100 feet back from the water's edge, at the small depression in the eastern extremity of the point. It is a rectangular, wooden building with a hip roof, surmounted by a square, wooden lantern rising from the middle of the roof. The sides of the building and lantern are painted white, and the roofs red. The lighthouse is 37 feet from its base to the ventilator on the lantern. The light is a fixed red dioptric light, of the seventh order, elevated 90 feet above high water mark, and visible 10 miles from all points of approach by water. During the period in which this lighthouse was being built, a temporary fixed white light was shown near the site of the lighthouse. The building was erected by days' work under the foremanship of Mr. G. Blain, and the amount expended to date has been $7,642.66."

Scarlett Point Lighthouse just before bell tower demolished in 1915

In 1909 a fog bell was installed at Scarlett Point, even though fog bells had a problem with low range and were mostly decommissioned in England around 1905, Canada and the United States continued to use them until the 1960s. The 1909 lightkeeper's son, Robert Vivian Hunt, said "There was a weight on a rope and you'd pull the weight up to the ceiling. As it came down, it turned the gears that swung the hammer against the bell. It was good for about half-an-hour, then it would have to be pulled up again."

In 1915 a diaphone type of foghorn building was installed at Scarlett Point.

In 1965 the original 1905 lighthouse was demolished and replaced with a conical tower made of steel, painted white, with the top being a red octagonal lantern room emitting a white light every five seconds.

=== Lightkeepers ===
Due to the remote location of Scarlett Point Lighthouse, the lightkeepers needed to remain on station twenty four hours a day, three hundred and sixty five days a year.

==== James William Davies ====
Scarlett Point's first lighthouse lightkeeper. A fog signal was not yet installed at Scarlett Point, so during low visibility hours, James would go outside and fire off his shotgun.

==== Theodore Nelson ====
Less than a year later Theodore Nelson replaced James William Davies. Instead of the shotgun used by the previous lightkeeper, Theodore was given a hand-pumped foghorn to answer ship's fog whistles. On April 20, 1908, a gasoline cargo ship exploded nearby, eleven survivors using a rowboat reached Scarlett Point Lighthouse. Theodore housed and fed the men for a few days until they left on a passing fishing ship called Celestial Empire. Theodore requested a raise after the incident but was denied, so he responded by resigning in September 1908.

==== William Hunt ====
William Hunt replaced Theodore Nelson in 1908. William moved onto Scarlett Point with his indigenous wife and two sons. While at the lighthouse he had eight more boys and one girl with his wife. One of the sons, named Robert Vivian Hunt, got a job moving mail and supplies from the town Port Hardy to Scarlett Point Lighthouse and Pine Island Lighthouse for $10 a month. He said this about his lightkeeper father: "I used to wait for what looked like a good spell of weather, but my father smoked plug tobacco in a pipe. That caused me some trouble. When he ran out of tobacco, I went to Port Hardy no matter what the weather was like. In good weather, with a good tide, I could make the trip in four hours. But sometimes, when it was bad, I'd be eight hours getting across."

In 1916 a ship from Scandinavia crashed into the rocks near Scarlett Point, puncturing its bow and losing its lifeboat. William rescued the entire crew with a rowboat. During the rescue, the ship captain leaned over his ship's railing and said to William "I know all the rocks around here, and this is one of them."

21 July 1940, a year after William retired, the mayor of Port Hardy awarded William the Imperial Service Medal in front of the whole town for his 31 years being Scarlett Point Lighthouse's lightkeeper.

==== Robert Vivian Hunt ====
Robert Vivian Hunt replaced his father William Hunt in 1939.

Robert was the middle child of eight boys born at Scarlett Point Lighthouse. Robert began working for the lighthouses at fifteen years old, moving mail and supplies from the town of Port Hardy to Scarlett Point Lighthouse and Pine Island Lighthouse for $10 a month. Robert married Irene Jennings in 1920 and moved her to Balaklava Island, the island Scarlett Point Lighthouse was located, and built a small dwelling. Robert and Irene had ten children, six of them born on Balaklava Island, delivered by Robert himself: "I had a little book and it told me all I needed to know to be a midwife."

Tommy Hunt, one of Robert's ten brothers, left Scarlett Point Lighthouse on 22 February 1930 in a rowboat with supplies but somehow drowned before reaching his destination. Robert reported to the authorities about his brother: "As far as I can make out, a comber must have struck the boat and turned her right over. He had his rubber hip boots on when he left here, he had them both off when we found his body next day." A few months later, Robert's mother felt sick, so Robert left in a rowboat to find a doctor, but his mother died at Scarlett Point Lighthouse only moments after Robert began rowing away, and "grief" of her son Tommy's death was blamed as her cause of death.

When Robert's father, William Hunt, retired as a lightkeeper in 1939, Robert took over as the lightkeeper for Scarlett Point Lighthouse, but only officially held the title of lightkeeper for one year before being replaced by veteran George Smith from the Department of Marine in 1941. Even though Robert was born, raised, and worked at Scarlett Point his whole life up to that point, lightkeeper positions were reserved for veterans at that time. Robert said "Jobs like that were given to veterans, and I wasn't one, so they moved me out to make way for a man who was."

After Robert was replaced at Scarlett Point Lighthouse, he moved his family into a landlocked decommissioned logging camp floathouse his father gave him. Robert continued taking a rowboat to visit Scarlett Point from 1941 to 1979. In 1979, at eighty-four years old, Robert's landlocked decommissioned logging camp floathouse his father gave him was robbed and burned to the ground. Even this did not dampen Robert's good nature, as the following year he was quoted as playfully saying: "They tell me I'll live to be 110. I'll go when God says: "Come on now old man".

==== George Leslie Smith ====
George Leslie Smith replaced Robert Vivian Hunt in 1941. Before arriving at Scarlett Point Lighthouse, George was the lightkeeper at Pine Island Lighthouse from 1936 to 1941. He left Scarlett Point in 1943 to be the lightkeeper for Nootka Lighthouse.

==== David Charteris Milne ====
David Charteris Milne replaced George Leslie Smith in 1943. Before arriving at Scarlett Point Lighthouse, David was the lightkeeper at Entrance Island Lighthouse from 1941 to 1943.

==== Frederick Arthur Mountain ====
Scarlett Point Lighthouse was Frederick Arthur Mountain's first lighthouse he was a lightkeeper for, he replaced David Charteris Milne in 1946. Frederick left Scarlett Point seven years later to be the keeper for Entrance Island Lighthouse. Six years later Frederick left Entrance Island to become the lightkeeper at Sheringham Point Lighthouse. While he was the lightkeeper for Sheringham Point, an earthquake shook the lighthouse, disturbing the mercury the lighthouse's lens sat in, causing mercury to spill onto the floor "I guess the lens wobbled some during the earthquake. We did spill some mercury onto the tower floor. Kind of hard to try and pick up and put back in. Now they get all excited if there's any mercury anywhere and we had a great big tub of it up there", said Frederick's assistant Mike Cross. Fredrick suddenly died a few years later, as mercury poisoning stealthy took the lives of many Lightkeepers through the years because mercury was not known yet to be deadly. According to the family of the lightkeeper who replaced Frederick, he now haunts Sheringham Point Lighthouse. The family is quoted as saying he's "a friendly" ghost "oh that's just Fred Mountain" they said "he moves the razor blades on the workbench... walks through bolted doors... and moves silently over creaky stairs".

==== Raymond Stockhand ====
Raymond Stockhand replaced Frederick Arthur Mountain in 1953. He remained at Scarlett Point for only one winter.

==== H.C. Pearce ====
Less than a year later H.C. Pearce replaced Raymond Stockhand in 1953.

==== Elmer "Bunk" Frank Cordoni ====
Elmer Frank Cordoni replaced H.C. Pearce in 1958. Elmer was known as "Bunk" to his friends, the name originated from when he told his army friends the story of when he fought at the Battle of Bunker Hill. After seven years at Scarlett Point, Bunk left with his family to be the lightkeeper at Active Pass Lighthouse for three years, then retired from being a lightkeeper to do something very similar: maintain navigational lights on the Fraser River, leading up to Indian Arm. November 2013 Bunk was admitted to the Surrey Memorial Hospital and stayed for nine months until dying on August 31, 2013.

==== Harold S. Whalen ====
Harold S. Whalen was first a lightkeeper at Entrance Island Lighthouse in 1959. Four years later he moved to be the lightkeeper for Active Pass Lighthouse. After two years at Active Pass, Harold moved again, this time to replace Elmer Frank Cordoni as the lightkeeper for Scarlett Point, remaining for four years before retiring from the lighthouses. Harold's eighteen-year-old daughter though became a lightkeeper at Quatsino Lighthouse with her nineteen year old husband, Pat, and their newborn baby son. They eventually moved to becoming the lightkeepers at Nootka Lighthouse, staying for thirty three years, totalling forty two years as lightkeepers before retiring and receiving a Queen Elizabeth II Golden Jubilee Medal (only seventeen have been awarded to lightkeepers) from Senator Pat Carney "Lightkeepers keep people connected", said Carney, "and no one has done that better than Ed and Pat Kidder."

A documentary was made about Harold's daughter and her husband's final days of retirement from Nootka Lighthouse called Leaving the Lights (2004).

==== R.W. Emrich ====
Ralph W. Emrich replaced Harold S. Whalen in 1969. Before arriving as the lightkeeper for Scarlett Point, Ralph was the assistant lightkeeper at Pine Island Lighthouse, and the principal lightkeeper for Entrance Island Lighthouse.

==== Ken Nelson ====
Ken became a lightkeeper in 1965 at Sheringham Point Lighthouse, and later that same year he moved to Lennard Island Lighthouse. After one year at Lennard Island, he moved to be the lightkeeper at Carmanah Point Lighthouse. Two years later Ken moved again, this to be the lightkeeper for Green Island Lighthouse, and a year later became the lightkeeper for Pine Island Lighthouse. In 1973, after four years at Pine Island, Ken moved to Scarlett Point to replace R.W. Emrich as the lightkeeper. Four years as Scarlett Point's lightkeeper, Ken then left to work on more lighthouses, being the lightkeeper on Discovery Island Lighthouse beginning in 1977 and Cape Mudge Lighthouse beginning in 1981. In 1985 Ken moved to Sisters Islets Lighthouse as the lightkeeper, staying for eleven years, and becoming its last lightkeeper before it was de-staffed in June 1996. Ken retired after Sisters Islets Lighthouse.

==== Alan Tansky ====
Alan Tansky was first a lightkeeper at Trial Island Lighthouse in 1969. Three years later he moved to be the lightkeeper for Nootka Lighthouse. After two years at Nootka, Alan was the lightkeeper for one year at Lucy Island Lighthouse before replaced Ken Nelson in 1977 as the lightkeeper for Scarlett Point. Alan then spent thirty years as Scarlett Point's lightkeeper before retiring in 2007.

Senator Pat Carney mentioned Alan Tansky at the 2002 Debate of the Senate in the Senate of Canada during the Heritage Lighthouse Protection Act Bill S-215 debate "Alan Tansky and his wife Darlene are at Scarlett Point near Port Hardy. His dad was a lightkeeper too. He has been on the lights since he was 12 years old. They home schooled a son and daughter on the lights."

==== Ivan Dubinsky ====
Ivan Dubinsky replaced Alan Tansky in 2007.

27 November 2019 Ivan matched all 10 numbers in the Lotto 6/49 draw, winning one million dollars. He had only just started playing the Lotto in the last months. "It's difficult to buy lottery tickets when you're at the lighthouse all the time", Ivan told the British Columbia Lottery Corporation (BCLC). He was able to play the Lotto by purchasing a virtual lottery ticket using the website PlayNow.com and was notified he won via email "When I got that e-mail, I couldn't believe my eyes, I wasn't sure whether to believe it or not", he said. "I usually just get a quick pick, so I didn't expect to win a big prize. But now that I'm down here at the lotto office (in Vancouver) I'm getting a bit excited. I'm planning to retire soon, so some of it will go to the purchase of a house and then some to my family. It's an exciting event, once in a lifetime." Ivan could not leave Scarlett Point to collect his winning at the lotto office for over two months "You have to be granted leave, and there's not too many lighthouse keepers available these days."

==== Lee Allen Johnson ====
Lee began working as cameraman in Hollywood for Warner Bros., ABC, A&E, and the BBC. He was also the video editor of TV commercials for Time Warner, KFC, Glidden, Yoplait, McDonald's, and Jack in the Box. And the cofounder of a film production studio called Cinema Centric. He then traveled internationally teaching as a Bikram Yoga Teacher, living in Denmark, Cambodia, Thailand, Singapore, Indonesia, Ireland, United Arab Emirates, Oman, Kenya, England, Philippines, Australia, Canada, and the USA. Lee then was hired by the Government of Denmark to lived and work 24/7, with his wife Ocean, in a maximum security prison, teaching yoga, gardening, and cooking to the inmates. Returning to Canada, Lee was hired by British Columbia Ministry of Environment and Climate Change Strategy to live 24/7 at the remote boat access only BC Park Cinnemousun Narrows Provincial Park as the Park Ranger replacement. Lee was offered the assistant Lightkeeper position at Pine Island Lighthouse, and moved to the island with his wife and cat. After Ivan Dubinsky won a million dollars playing the lottery in 2019, Ivan retired the following year and was replaced by Lee Allen Johnson as the Principal Lighthouse Keeper for Scarlett Point Lighthouse.

== Principal lighthouse keepers ==
1. James William Davies (1905 - 1906)
2. Theodore Nelson (1906 - 1908)
3. William Hunt (1908 - 1939)
4. Robert Vivian Hunt (1940 - 1941)
5. George Leslie Smith (1941 - 1943)
6. David Charteris Milne (1943 - 1946)
7. Frederick Arthur Mountain (1946 - 1953)
8. Raymond Stockhand (1953 - 1953)
9. H.C. Pearce (1953 - 1958)
10. Elmer "Bunk" Frank Cordoni (1958 - 1964)
11. Harold S. Whalen (1965 - 1969)
12. R.W. Emrich (1969 - 1973)
13. Ken Nelson (1973 - 1977)
14. Alan Tansky (1977 - 2004)
15. Ivan Dubinsky (2007 - 2020)
16. Lee Allen Johnson (2020 - 2024)
17. Alberto García Feito (2024 - present)

== Lightkeepers weather reports ==
Weather is given by Scarlett Point lightkeepers every three hours to the Canadian Coast Guard using a VHF radio.

== See also ==
- Lighthouse keeper
- Lighthouse
- List of lighthouses in Canada
- List of lighthouses in British Columbia
- Heritage Lighthouse Protection Act
- Canadian Coast Guard Lighthouses
