= Triple Island Lightstation =

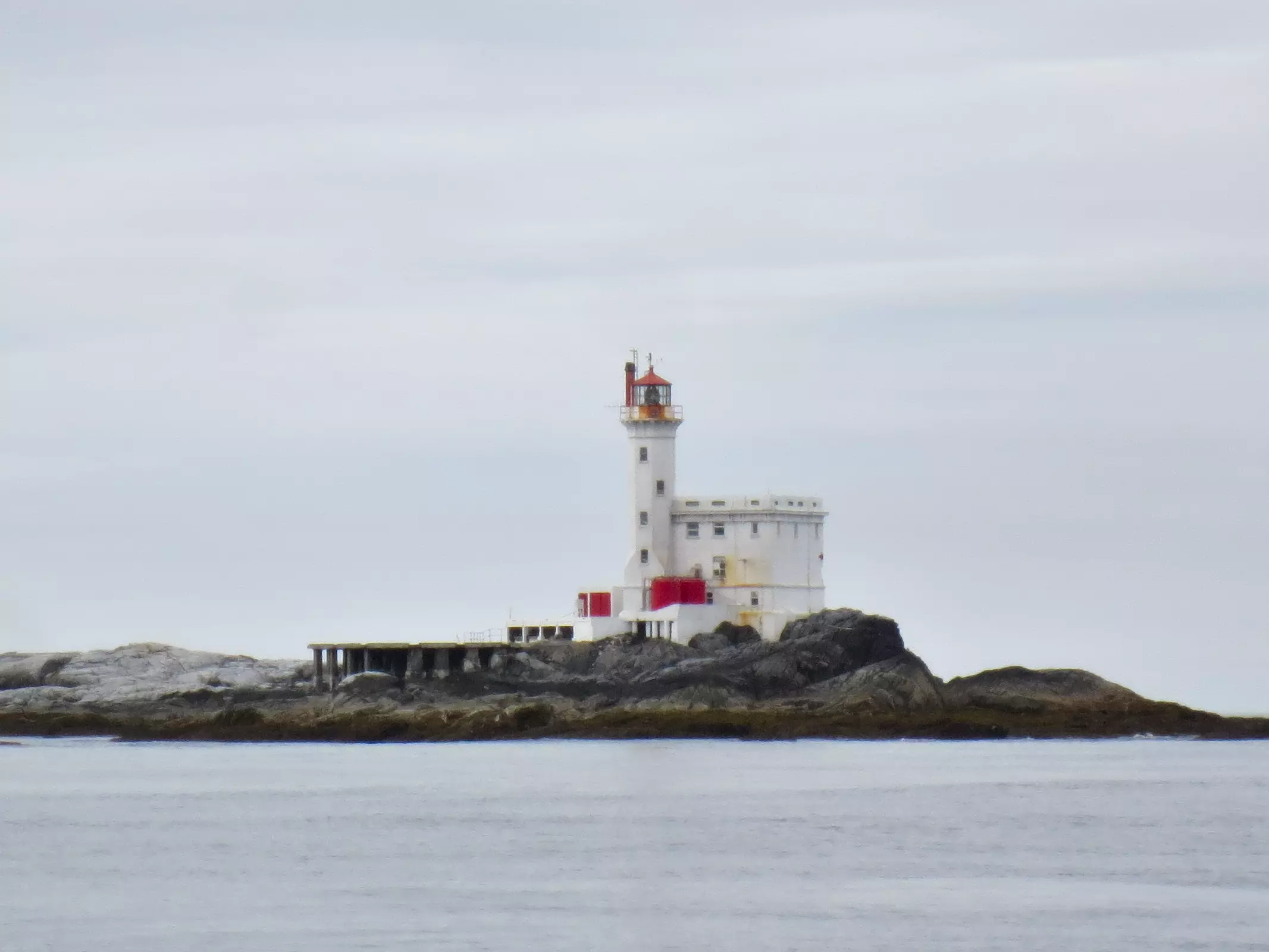
- Triple Island Lightstation as viewed from Brown Passage
- Location: Brown Passage; 25 miles (40 km) W of Prince Rupert; British Columbia; Canada
- Coordinates: 54°17′41″N 130°52′50″W

Tower
- Constructed: 1920
- Construction: concrete tower
- Height: 23 metres (75 ft)
- Shape: octagonal tower with balcony and lantern attached two a two-story keeper's house
- Markings: white tower, red balcony and lantern
- Operator: Canadian Coast Guard
- Heritage: national Historic Sites of Canada, recognized federal heritage building of Canada, heritage lighthouse
- Fog signal: deactivated

Light
- First lit: 1921
- Focal height: 28 metres (92 ft)
- Range: 16 nautical miles (30 km; 18 mi)
- Characteristic: Fl (2) W 9s.
- Triple Island Light Tower; Prince Rupert Lighthouse
- Nearest city: Prince Rupert, British Columbia

Site notes
- Architect: Colonel W. A. Anderson
- Architectural style: Octagonal concrete lighthouse tower
- Governing body: Government of Canada

National Historic Site of Canada
- Official name: Triple Island Lighthouse National Historic Site of Canada
- Designated: 1974

Triple Island Lighthouse is a manned light station on Triple Island, British Columbia, Canada. Built in 1920 after four years of construction, the concrete station features a 23 metres (75 ft) tower attached to a rectangular concrete structure that houses the keepers' quarters and machinery. A Triple Island helipad (IATA: YTI) occupies much of the remainder of the islet. Canadian Coast Guard personnel man the station on a 28-day rotation. The station was designated a National Historic Site of Canada in 1974.

From 1939 to 1970, the Triple Island lightstation was part of the British Columbia Shore Station Oceanographic Program, collecting coastal water temperature and salinity measurements for the Department of Fisheries and Oceans everyday for 31 years.

== See also ==
- List of lighthouses in British Columbia
- List of lighthouses in Canada
