= Green Island Lighthouse =

Green Island Lighthouse may refer to:

- Green Island Lighthouse (Hong Kong), China
- Green Island Lighthouse (British Columbia), in Prince Rupert, British Columbia, Canada, one of British Columbia's lighthouses
- Green Island Lighthouse (Taiwan), in Taitung County
