= Amphitrite Point Lighthouse =

Lighthouse in British Columbia, Canada

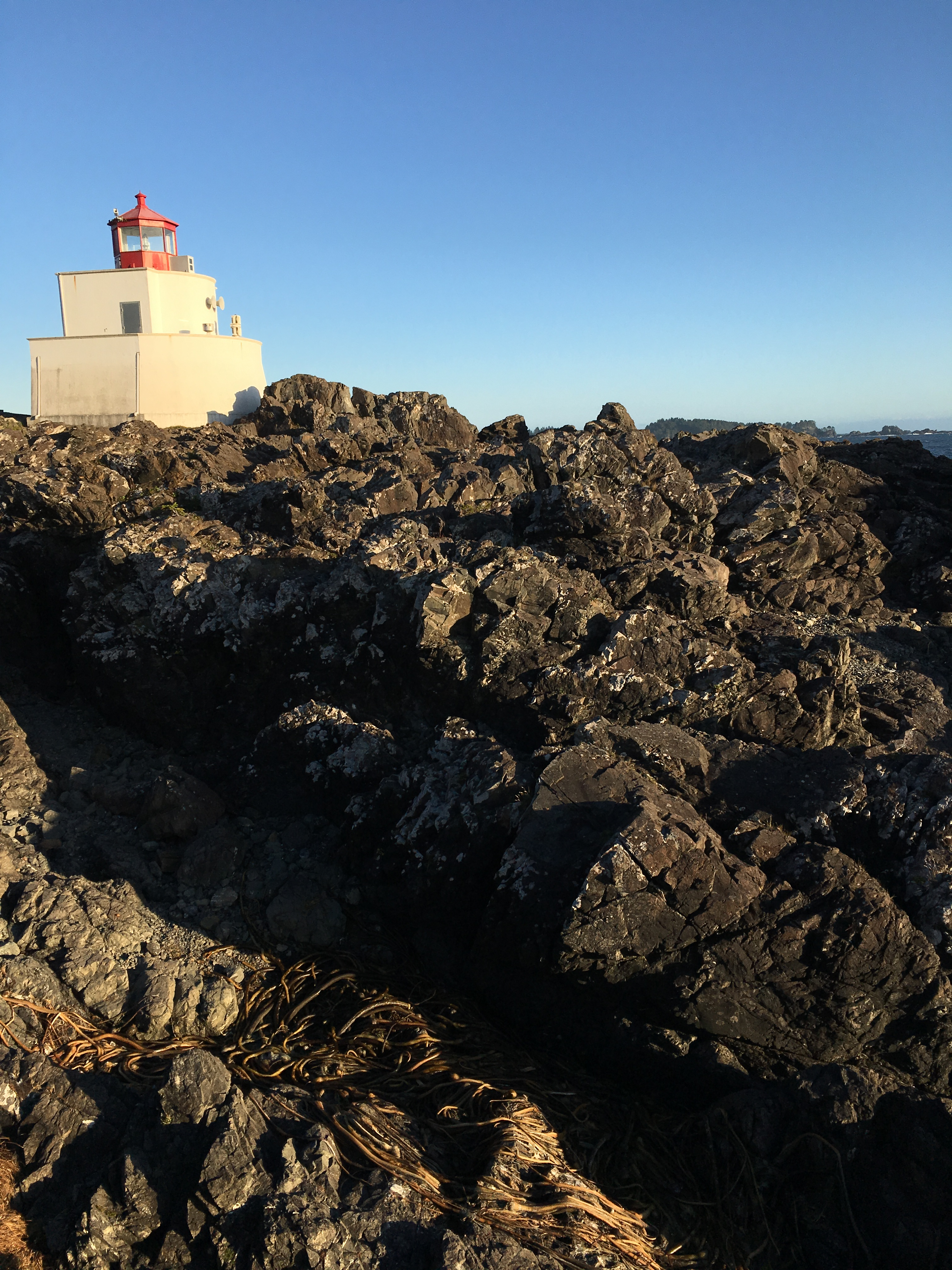
- Location: Vancouver Island; British Columbia; Canada
- Coordinates: 48°55′16.3″N 125°32′28.1″W

Tower
- Constructed: 1915
- Construction: concrete tower
- Automated: 1988
- Height: 6 metres (20 ft)
- Shape: tower with balcony and lantern
- Markings: white tower, red lantern
- Fog signal: (2) 20 s

Light
- First lit: March 1915
- Focal height: 15 metres (49 ft)
- Range: 15 nmi (28 km; 17 mi)
- Characteristic: Fl W 12 s

Amphitrite Point Lighthouse is an active lighthouse in Ucluelet on the west coast of Vancouver Island in British Columbia, Canada, named after Amphitrite, the sea goddess and wife of Poseidon in Greek mythology. It is also known for one of the sample pictures in Windows 7.

== Geography ==
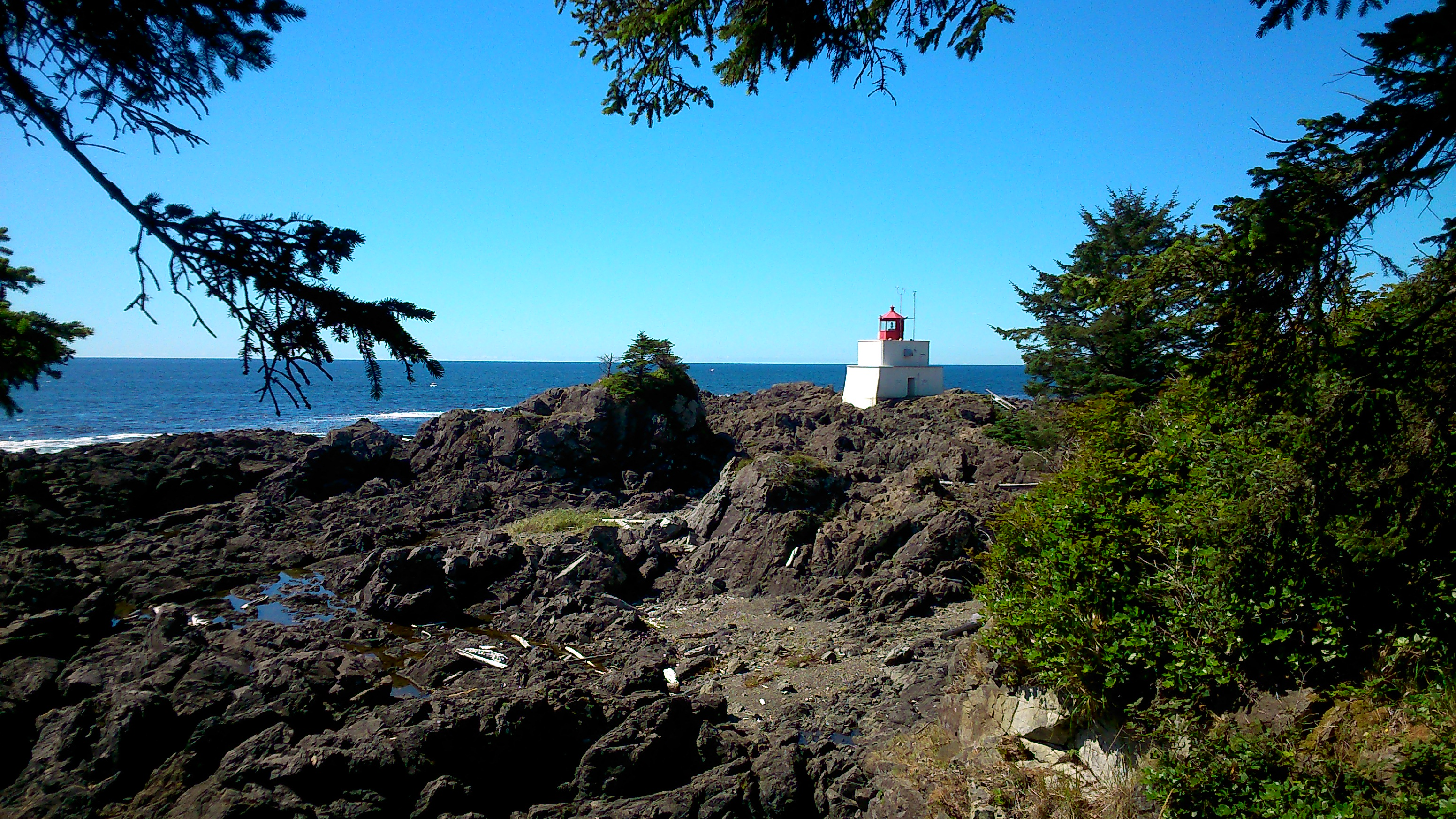
The lighthouse can be accessed via the Wild Pacific Trail

Amphitrite Point has the only active lighthouse in the Tofino-Ucluelet area accessible by automobile, with the only other local lighthouse being on Lennard Island, viewable only by air or boat. The Amphitrite Point Light is located at the southern end of the Ucluelet Peninsula and the north side of the Barkley Sound, approximately 3 kilometers south of downtown Ucluelet and 40 kilometers south of Tofino, British Columbia. The lighthouse tower is closed to the public but the grounds are open as part of the Lighthouse Loop section of the Wild Pacific Trail. In addition to hiking the trail to view the lighthouse, visitors can park at the end of Coast Guard Road and walk directly to the lighthouse in 2–3 minutes. Amphitrite Point, much like the rest of the Ucluelet Peninsula, is subjected to frequent winter storms and has an oceanic climate (Köppen Cfb) with approximately 3.3 metres (130 inches) of annual rainfall. The next active lighthouse to the north of Amphitrite Point Light is the Lennard Island Lighthouse off of Chesterman Beach; the next active lighthouse to the south is the Cape Beale Lightstation on the south side of Barkley Sound.

== History ==
The first lighthouse at this site was a small wooden tower built in 1906. This lighthouse was destroyed in bad weather in 1914, and the current concrete lighthouse opened in March 1915. Amphitrite Point is exposed to frequent gale-force winds, tidal waves and is also in a tsunami inundation zone, so the current lighthouse (built in 1915) derives its peculiar shape and construction from being designed to withstand strong westerly storms coming off the Pacific Ocean. It was staffed by Canadian Coast Guard lighthouse keepers from 1915 until 1988, when it was automated.

== Oceanographic research ==
The Amphitrite Point Light is one of 12 lighthouses part of the British Columbia Shore Station Oceanographic Program, collecting coastal water temperature and salinity measurements everyday since 1934. Their data show an increase in coastal water temperatures of 0.08 °C per decade. This trend is a result of anthropogenic climate change.

== Climate ==
Climate data for Amphitrite Point Light
Month	Jan	Feb	Mar	Apr	May	Jun	Jul	Aug	Sep	Oct	Nov	Dec	Year
Record high °C (°F)	18.2 (64.8)	16.8 (62.2)	17.2 (63.0)	19.7 (67.5)	22.4 (72.3)	24.9 (76.8)	25.5 (77.9)	26.6 (79.9)	25.6 (78.1)	20.8 (69.4)	16.6 (61.9)	14.5 (58.1)	26.6 (79.9)
Mean daily maximum °C (°F)	8.3 (46.9)	8.9 (48.0)	10.2 (50.4)	11.6 (52.9)	13.9 (57.0)	15.3 (59.5)	16.8 (62.2)	17.3 (63.1)	16.4 (61.5)	13.3 (55.9)	10.1 (50.2)	8.1 (46.6)	12.5 (54.5)
Daily mean °C (°F)	6.1 (43.0)	6.4 (43.5)	7.3 (45.1)	8.6 (47.5)	11.0 (51.8)	12.7 (54.9)	14.2 (57.6)	14.7 (58.5)	13.7 (56.7)	10.7 (51.3)	7.7 (45.9)	5.7 (42.3)	9.9 (49.8)
Mean daily minimum °C (°F)	3.9 (39.0)	3.8 (38.8)	4.5 (40.1)	5.6 (42.1)	8.1 (46.6)	10.2 (50.4)	11.6 (52.9)	12.1 (53.8)	11.0 (51.8)	8.1 (46.6)	5.3 (41.5)	3.3 (37.9)	7.3 (45.1)
Record low °C (°F)	−7.3 (18.9)	−12.8 (9.0)	−6.0 (21.2)	−2.1 (28.2)	1.0 (33.8)	5.5 (41.9)	5.2 (41.4)	7.4 (45.3)	5.2 (41.4)	−0.7 (30.7)	−6.9 (19.6)	−7.6 (18.3)	−12.8 (9.0)
Average precipitation mm (inches)	462.1 (18.19)	371.2 (14.61)	311.1 (12.25)	262.4 (10.33)	157.1 (6.19)	140.3 (5.52)	71.8 (2.83)	75.3 (2.96)	113.4 (4.46)	339.0 (13.35)	464.2 (18.28)	421.4 (16.59)	3,189.2 (125.56)
Average rainfall mm (inches)	458.0 (18.03)	361.4 (14.23)	309.4 (12.18)	262.3 (10.33)	157.1 (6.19)	140.3 (5.52)	71.8 (2.83)	75.3 (2.96)	113.4 (4.46)	339.0 (13.35)	458.5 (18.05)	414.2 (16.31)	3,160.6 (124.43)
Average snowfall cm (inches)	4.1 (1.6)	9.1 (3.6)	1.7 (0.7)	0.1 (0.0)	0.0 (0.0)	0.0 (0.0)	0.0 (0.0)	0.0 (0.0)	0.0 (0.0)	0.0 (0.0)	2.4 (0.9)	7.3 (2.9)	24.7 (9.7)
Average precipitation days (≥ 0.2 mm)	22.4	19.6	20.7	18.8	15.6	14.3	10.7	9.6	12.7	19.5	23.8	22.1	209.8
Average rainy days (≥ 0.2 mm)	22.0	19.2	20.7	18.8	15.6	14.3	10.7	9.6	12.7	19.5	23.4	21.5	208.1
Average snowy days (≥ 0.2 cm)	1.3	2.1	1.1	0.16	0.0	0.0	0.0	0.0	0.0	0.06	1.1	1.7	7.4
Source: Environment Canada

== Gallery ==
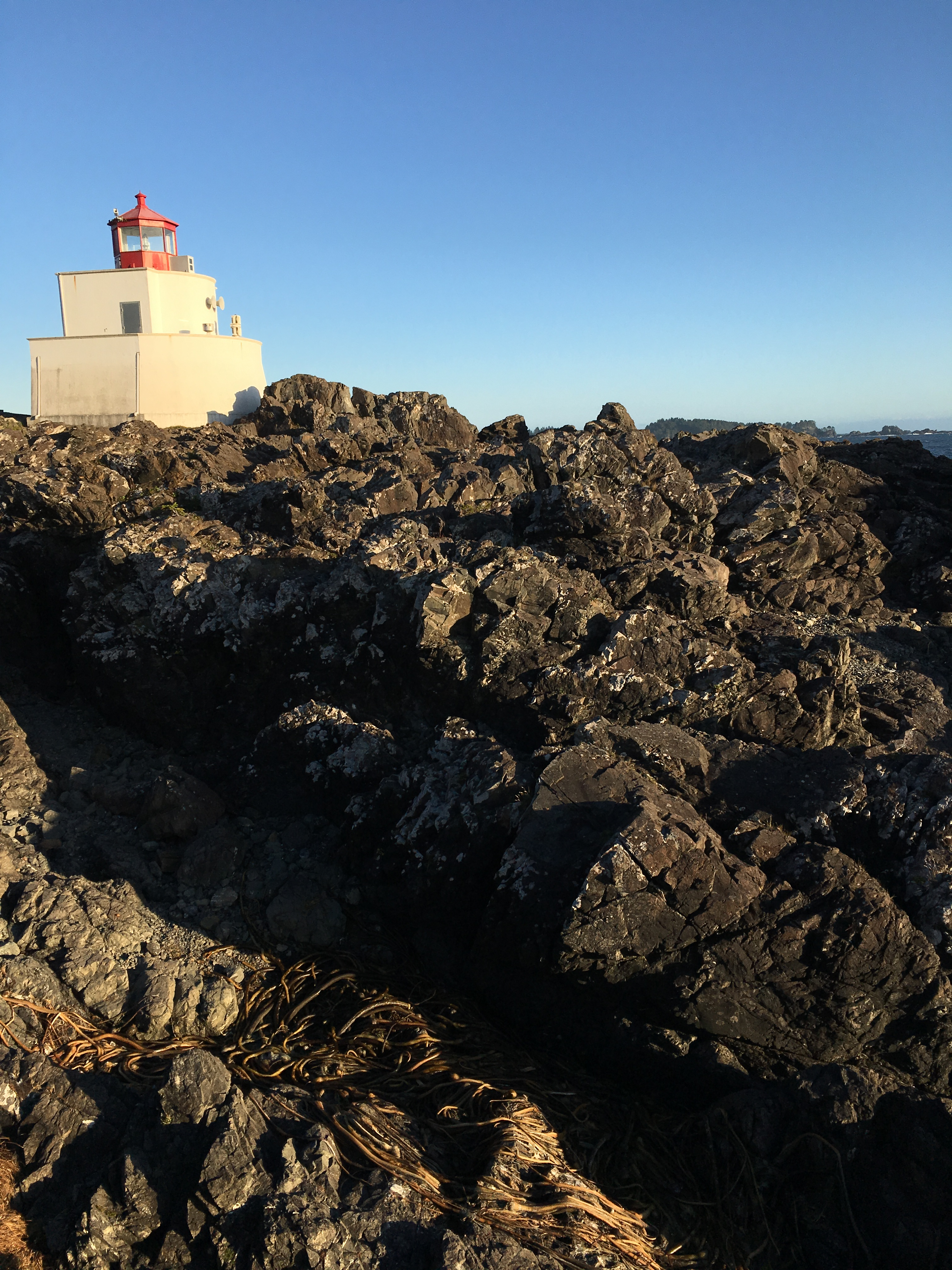

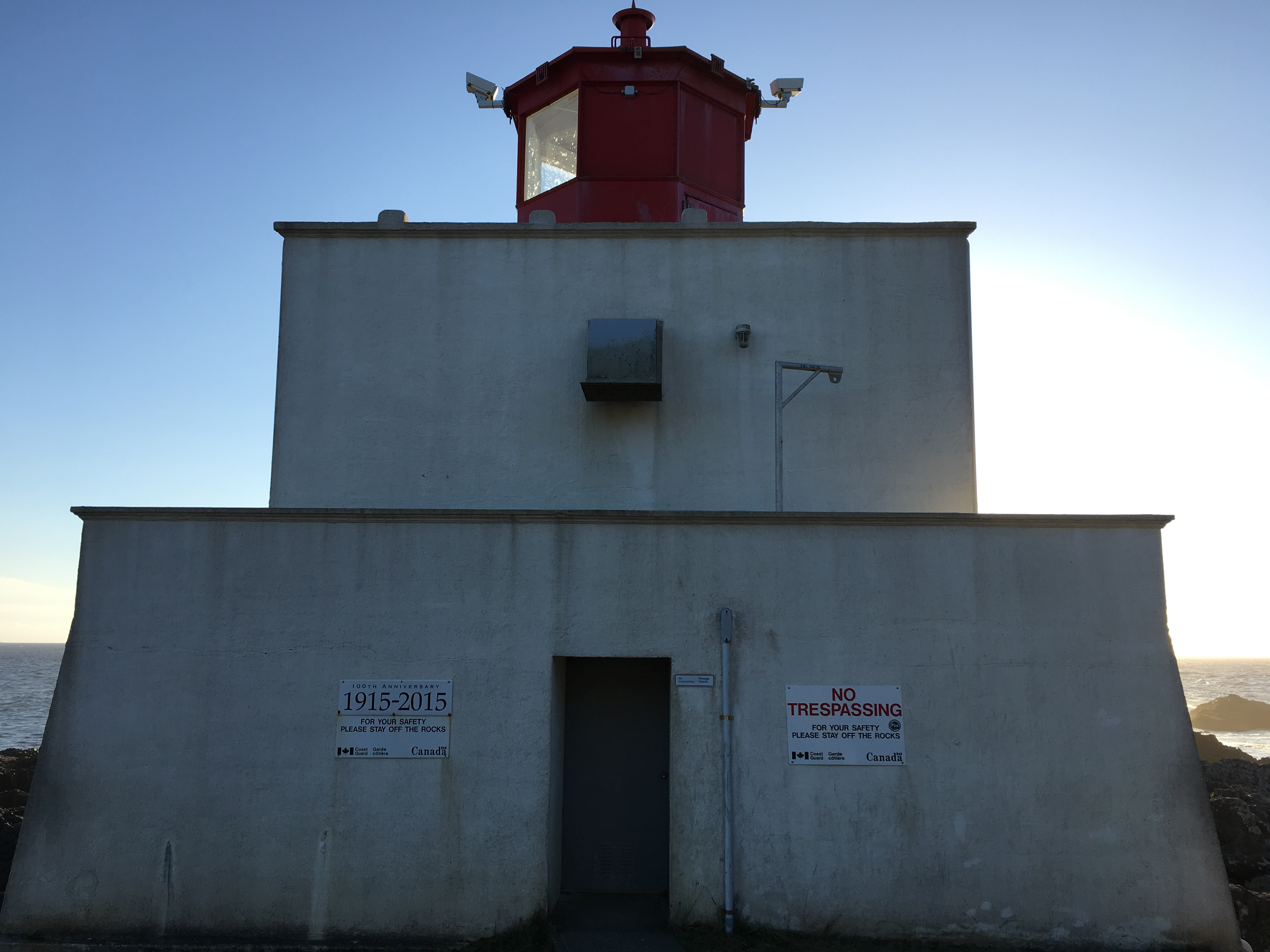

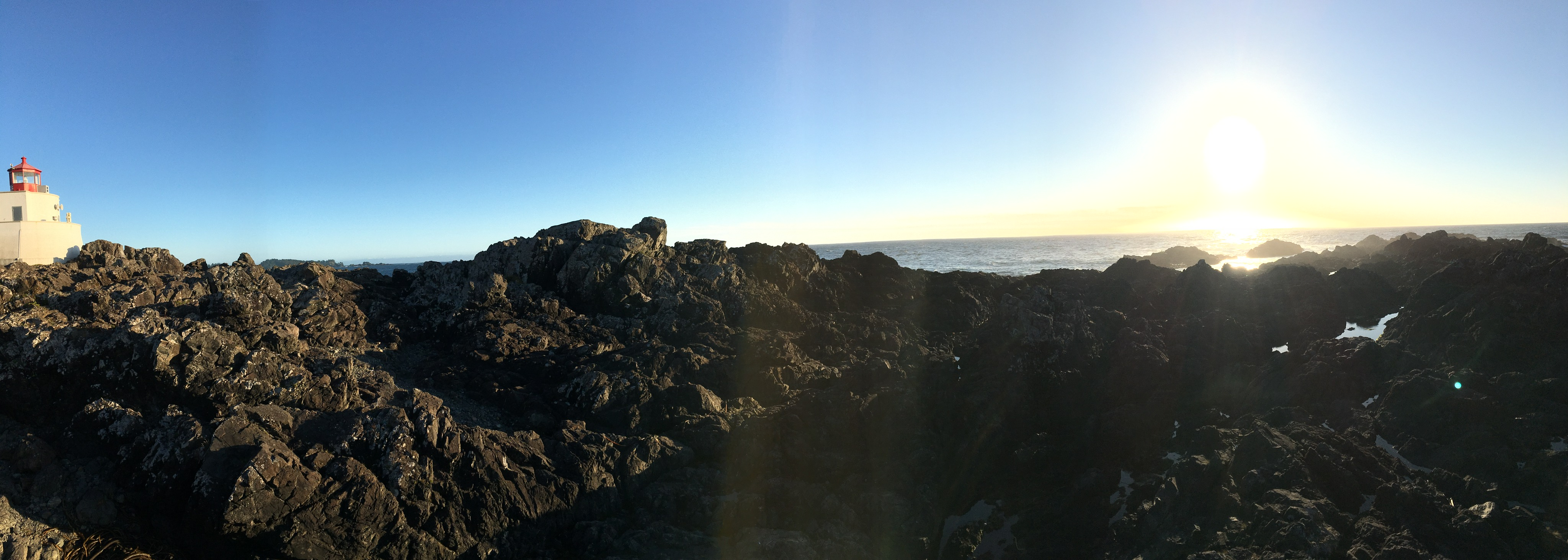

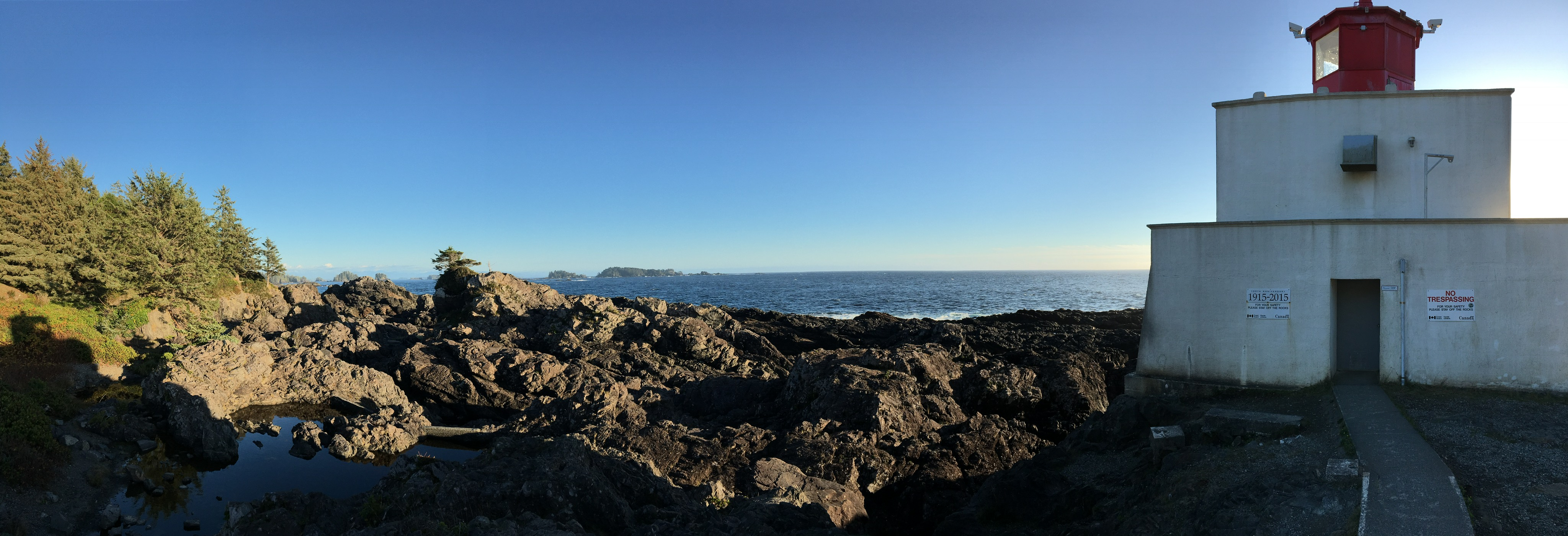

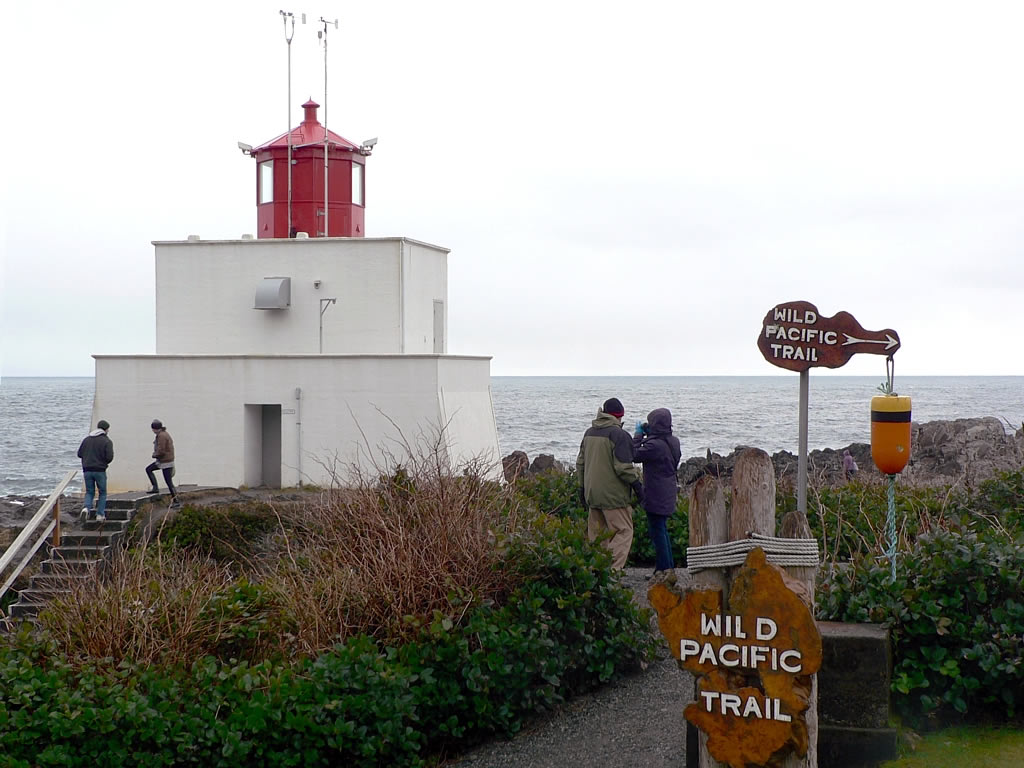

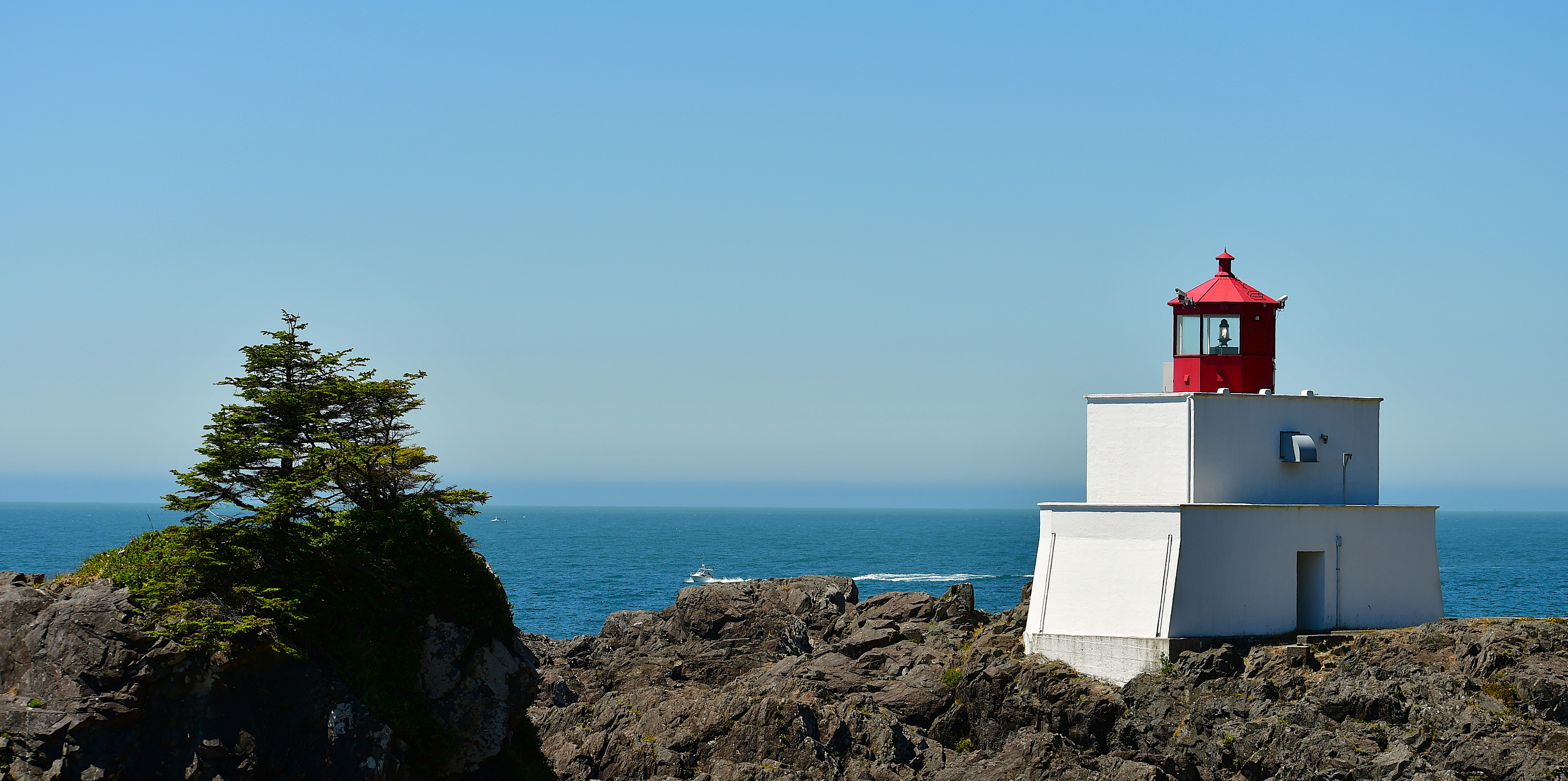

== See also ==
- Ucluelet
- Tofino
- Pacific Rim National Park Reserve
- List of lighthouses in British Columbia
- List of lighthouses in Canada
