= Race Rocks Light =

Lighthouse in British Columbia, Canada

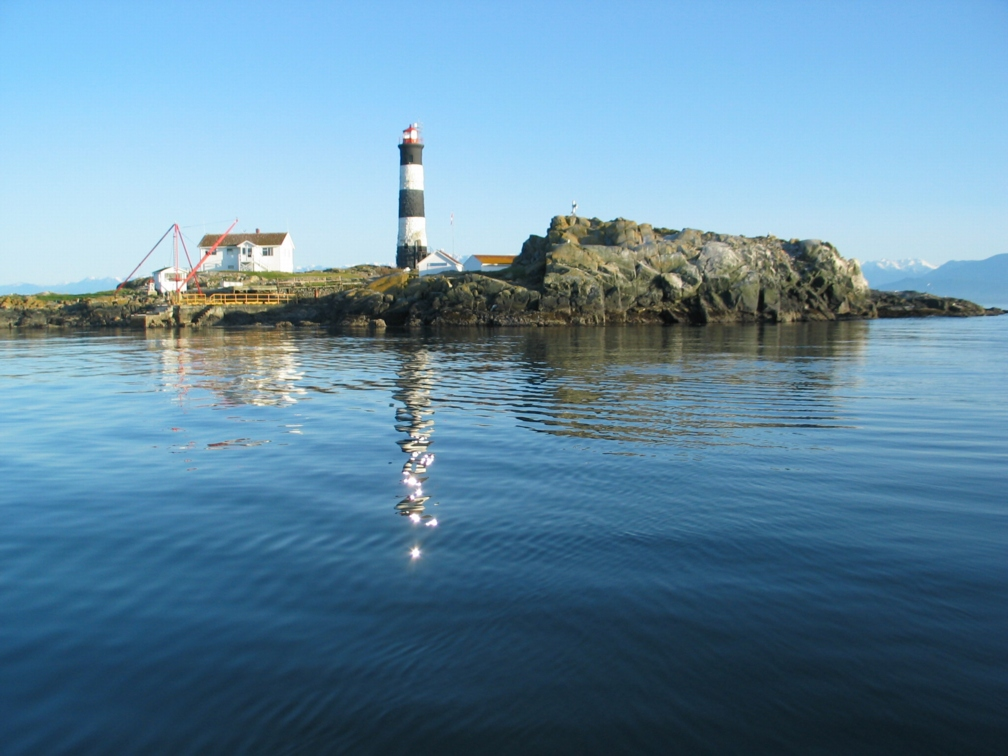
- Location: Great Race Rock, Juan de Fuca Electoral Area, Capital Regional District, British Columbia, Canada
- Coordinates: 48°17′52.9″N 123°31′53.1″W

Tower
- Constructed: 1859–1860
- Construction: stone tower
- Automated: 1997
- Height: 24.4 metres (80 ft)
- Shape: cylindrical tower with balcony and lantern
- Markings: tower with black and white bands, red lantern
- Operator: Pearson College UWC
- Heritage: recognized federal heritage building of Canada
- Fog signal: (3) 60 s

Light
- First lit: 26 December 1860
- Focal height: 36 metres (118 ft)
- Range: 19 nmi (35 km; 22 mi)
- Characteristic: Fl W 10 s

Race Rocks Light is one of the first two lighthouses that were built on the west coast of Canada, financed by the British Government and illuminated in 1860. It is the only lighthouse on that coast built of rock — granite purportedly quarried in Scotland and topped with sandstone quarried on Gabriola Island. The islets of Race Rocks are located just off the southern tip of Vancouver Island, about 17 km (10 mi) southwest of Victoria, British Columbia.

== History ==
The lighthouse was built between 1859 and 1860 by the crew of HMS Topaze and outside labourers under a contract awarded to John Morris by the British Government. It was illuminated on 26 December 1860, six weeks after the smaller Fisgard Island lighthouse built at the entrance to Esquimalt Harbour in Colwood. In 2010, both lighthouses celebrated their sesquicentennial.

It has a 24.4 m (80 feet) cylindrical tower with black and white bands, and flashes a white light every 10 seconds. Its foghorn sounds three blasts at one-minute intervals.

The lighthouse has been automated since 1997 at which time Pearson College UWC took over the management of the station and the surrounding Race Rocks Ecological Reserve. Restoration of the interior and exterior of the historic light tower was carried out in 2009. It remains owned by the Canadian Coast Guard but the college leases the station and has established an endowment fund to maintain it.

== Oceanographic research ==
The Race Rocks Light is one of 12 lighthouses part of the British Columbia Shore Station Oceanographic Program, collecting coastal water temperature and salinity measurements every day since 1921.

== Keepers ==
- George Nicholas Davies (1861–1866)
- Thomas Argyle (1866–1888, retired)
- Albert Argyle (1888–1889)
- W.P. Daykin (6 December 1889–January 1891, transferred to Carmanah)
- Frederick Mercer Eastwood (31 January 1891 – 1919)
- James Thomas Forsyth (1919–1932)
- Henry I. McKenzie (1932–1933)
- Andrew Ritchie (1933–1940)
- Thomas Westhead (1940–1948)
- Arthur Anderson (1948–1950)
- Percival C. Pike (1950–1952)
- Gordon Odlum (1952–1961)
- Charles Clark (1961)
- Ben Rogers (1961–1964)
- J. Alan Tully (1964–1966)
- Trevor M. Anderson (1966–1982)
- Charles Redhead(1982–1989)
- Mike E. Slater (1989–1997)

== See also ==
- Race Rocks Ecological Reserve
- Pearson College UWC
- Fisgard Lighthouse National Historic Site
- List of lighthouses in British Columbia
