= Langara Light =

Lighthouse in British Columbia, Canada

Langara Point
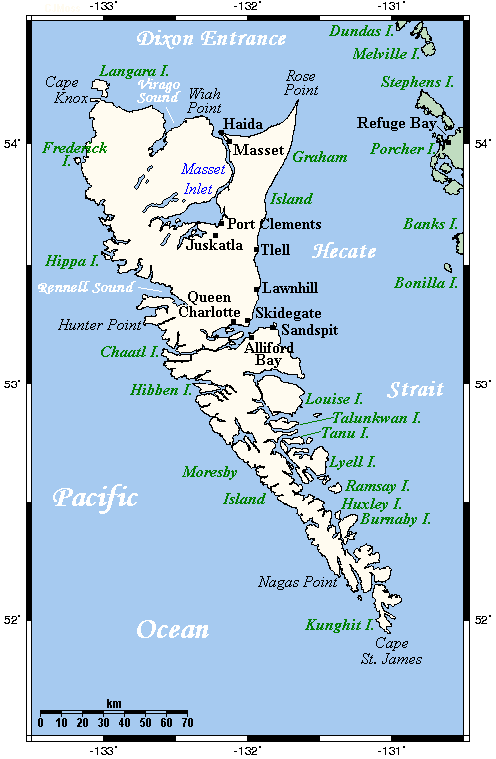
- Location: Haida Gwaii; British Columbia; Canada
- Coordinates: 54°15′19.4″N 133°03′33.8″W

Tower
- Constructed: 1913
- Construction: concrete tower
- Height: 7.5 metres (25 ft)
- Shape: hexagonal frustum six ribbed tower with balcony and lantern
- Markings: white tower, red lantern
- Operator: Canadian Coast Guard
- Heritage: recognized federal heritage building of Canada, heritage lighthouse

Light
- First lit: 1913
- Focal height: 49 metres (161 ft)
- Range: 8 nmi (15 km; 9.2 mi)
- Characteristic: Fl W 5s.

The Langara Point Lighthouse is a staffed lighthouse located atop a scenic bluff on the northwest corner of Langara Island. It is one of only two lighthouses in Haida Gwaii – the other being at Cape St. James (now an automated station), at the southern tip of the islands. Both were built in 1913.

During World War II, the lighthouse was painted camouflage green and a radar station was built here to monitor the North Pacific.

The original light, still in use today, is a first-order Fresnel lens (the largest type of lighthouse lens) manufactured by Chance Brothers of England. Each side of the lens is over 8 feet (2.4 m) tall and 5 feet (1.5 m) wide with a focal length of 3 feet (0.91 m).

The lighthouse is easily seen from the water and tours are possible via helicopter. Guests to Langara Island can enjoy a 1-2 hour tour of the lighthouse and its surrounding grounds, usually including a trip up to the top of the light tower, as well as coffee or tea with the lightkeepers.

The Langara Light is one of 12 lighthouses part of the British Columbia Shore Station Oceanographic Program, collecting coastal water temperature and salinity measurements everyday since 1936.

== Keepers ==
- Head Keepers: James T. Forsyth 1913–1918
- William J. Stinson 1918–1919
- J. McCann 1919
- George Armstrong 1919–1932
- H. Greenwood 1932–1936
- Gordon Odlum 1941–1942
- William Norman Kinnear 1943–1945
- Neil Lange 1945–1947
- Richard Crawford 1948–1950
- Otto Lindstrom 1950–1953
- George Brown 1953–1957
- Edward Albert Hartt 1957–1963
- Wilf Redlac 1963–1964
- Maurice Collette 1967–1971
- Ken Wallace 1971–1973
- Tom E. Carr 1973–1975
- Charles Redhead 1975–1982
- Edward J. Ashe 1982–1983
- Kenneth Brunn 1983–1989
- Warren Kennedy 1989–1992
- Gordon Schweers 1992–2010
- Stanley Westhaver 2010–present

== See also ==
- List of lighthouses in British Columbia
- List of lighthouses in Canada
- Henri de Miffonis
