= Boat Bluff Lighthouse =

Lighthouse in British Columbia, Canada

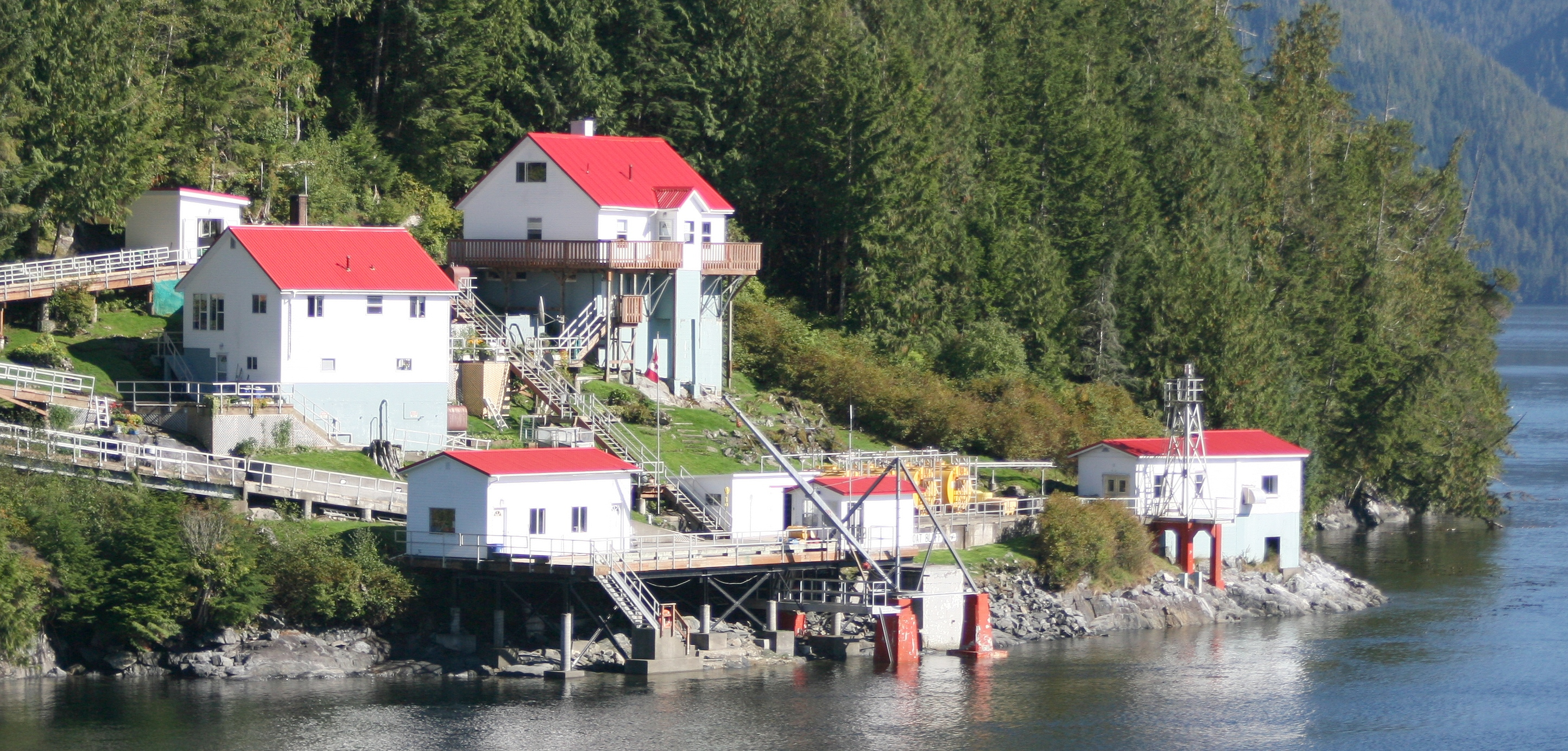
- The lighthouse in 2009
- Location: Sarah Island; British Columbia; Canada
- Coordinates: 52.6429°N 128.5231°W

Tower
- Constructed: station established 1897
- Foundation: concrete base
- Construction: metal skeletal tower
- Height: 7 metres (23 ft)
- Shape: square pyramidal tower
- Markings: white tower
- Operator: Canadian Coast Guard
- Heritage: heritage lighthouse

Light
- First lit: 1907
- Focal height: 11.5 metres (38 ft)
- Range: 7 nmi (13 km; 8.1 mi)
- Characteristic: Oc W R 5s.

Boat Bluff Lighthouse is located near Klemtu on the scenic south end of Sarah Island in Tolmie Channel on the Inside Passage of British Columbia. The lighthouse was established in 1907. The skeleton tower is 24 feet high giving it a focal plane 38 feet above sea level. The station is still staffed by resident keepers.

== Keepers ==
- John William Webster 1932–1934
- Tom White 1934–at least 1937
- H. Shorson at least 1960
- Angus Macdonald 1965
- Clayton Ralph Marshall 1966–1967
- Ken Wallace 1967–1971
- D.L. White 1971–1973
- Charles Redhead 1974–1975
- P. Brown 1974–1978
- Clayton Restall 1979–1980
- Dieter Losel 1980– 1983
- James A. Abram 1984–1985
- Robert Akerstrom 1985–1987
- Larry Douglas 1985–1987
- Lance Barrett-Lennard 1987–1988
- Andrew Findlay 1988–1996
- Frank Dwyer 1996–1998
- Mike Higgins 2003–2008
- Gerry LaRose 2008–2010
- Howard Munn 2010–2022
- Spencer Wilson 2022–present

== Climate ==
Boat Bluff has an oceanic climate (Cfb) with mild summers and cool winters with heavy rainfall year-round. Boat Bluff is among the rainiest places in Canada.

Climate data for Boat Bluff 1981–2010
Month	Jan	Feb	Mar	Apr	May	Jun	Jul	Aug	Sep	Oct	Nov	Dec	Year
Record high humidex	15.1	12.2	17.6	21.1	27.5	30.1	36.2	30.5	27.9	23.4	13.3	12.0	36.2
Record high °C (°F)	18.0 (64.4)	17.0 (62.6)	20.0 (68.0)	25.5 (77.9)	31.5 (88.7)	33.5 (92.3)	32.5 (90.5)	33.0 (91.4)	30.0 (86.0)	21.0 (69.8)	16.5 (61.7)	15.5 (59.9)	33.5 (92.3)
Mean daily maximum °C (°F)	6.0 (42.8)	6.6 (43.9)	8.3 (46.9)	10.9 (51.6)	14.1 (57.4)	16.6 (61.9)	18.7 (65.7)	19.0 (66.2)	16.2 (61.2)	11.7 (53.1)	7.6 (45.7)	5.8 (42.4)	11.8 (53.2)
Daily mean °C (°F)	3.6 (38.5)	3.9 (39.0)	5.3 (41.5)	7.4 (45.3)	10.4 (50.7)	12.9 (55.2)	14.7 (58.5)	15.1 (59.2)	12.8 (55.0)	9.0 (48.2)	5.2 (41.4)	3.6 (38.5)	8.7 (47.6)
Mean daily minimum °C (°F)	1.2 (34.2)	1.2 (34.2)	2.2 (36.0)	3.9 (39.0)	6.6 (43.9)	9.0 (48.2)	10.8 (51.4)	11.1 (52.0)	9.4 (48.9)	6.4 (43.5)	2.9 (37.2)	1.4 (34.5)	5.5 (41.9)
Record low °C (°F)	−16.0 (3.2)	−17.5 (0.5)	−14.0 (6.8)	−1.0 (30.2)	−1.0 (30.2)	4.0 (39.2)	5.5 (41.9)	6.5 (43.7)	4.0 (39.2)	−7.6 (18.3)	−20.2 (−4.4)	−14.0 (6.8)	−20.2 (−4.4)
Record low wind chill	−18	−15	−10	0	0	0	0	0	0	0	−11	−21	−21
Average precipitation mm (inches)	601.9 (23.70)	428.5 (16.87)	428.4 (16.87)	389.1 (15.32)	257.7 (10.15)	226.2 (8.91)	179.8 (7.08)	231.4 (9.11)	366.0 (14.41)	631.8 (24.87)	677.8 (26.69)	628.1 (24.73)	5,046.7 (198.71)
Average rainfall mm (inches)	574.5 (22.62)	400.3 (15.76)	414.6 (16.32)	386.9 (15.23)	257.7 (10.15)	226.2 (8.91)	179.8 (7.08)	231.4 (9.11)	366.0 (14.41)	630.0 (24.80)	670.1 (26.38)	606.2 (23.87)	4,943.7 (194.64)
Average snowfall cm (inches)	27.4 (10.8)	28.3 (11.1)	13.9 (5.5)	2.3 (0.9)	0.0 (0.0)	0.0 (0.0)	0.0 (0.0)	0.0 (0.0)	0.0 (0.0)	1.9 (0.7)	7.6 (3.0)	21.9 (8.6)	103.3 (40.6)
Average precipitation days (≥ 0.2 mm)	23.3	19.6	22.9	21.4	19.7	17.8	16.7	17.4	19.4	24.7	24.9	24.9	252.7
Average snowy days (≥ 0.2 cm)	4.0	3.7	3.3	1.0	0.0	0.0	0.0	0.0	0.0	0.3	2.0	4.2	18.5
Source: Environment Canada

== See also ==
- List of lighthouses in British Columbia
- List of lighthouses in Canada
