= Cape Mudge Lighthouse =

Lighthouse in British Columbia, Canada

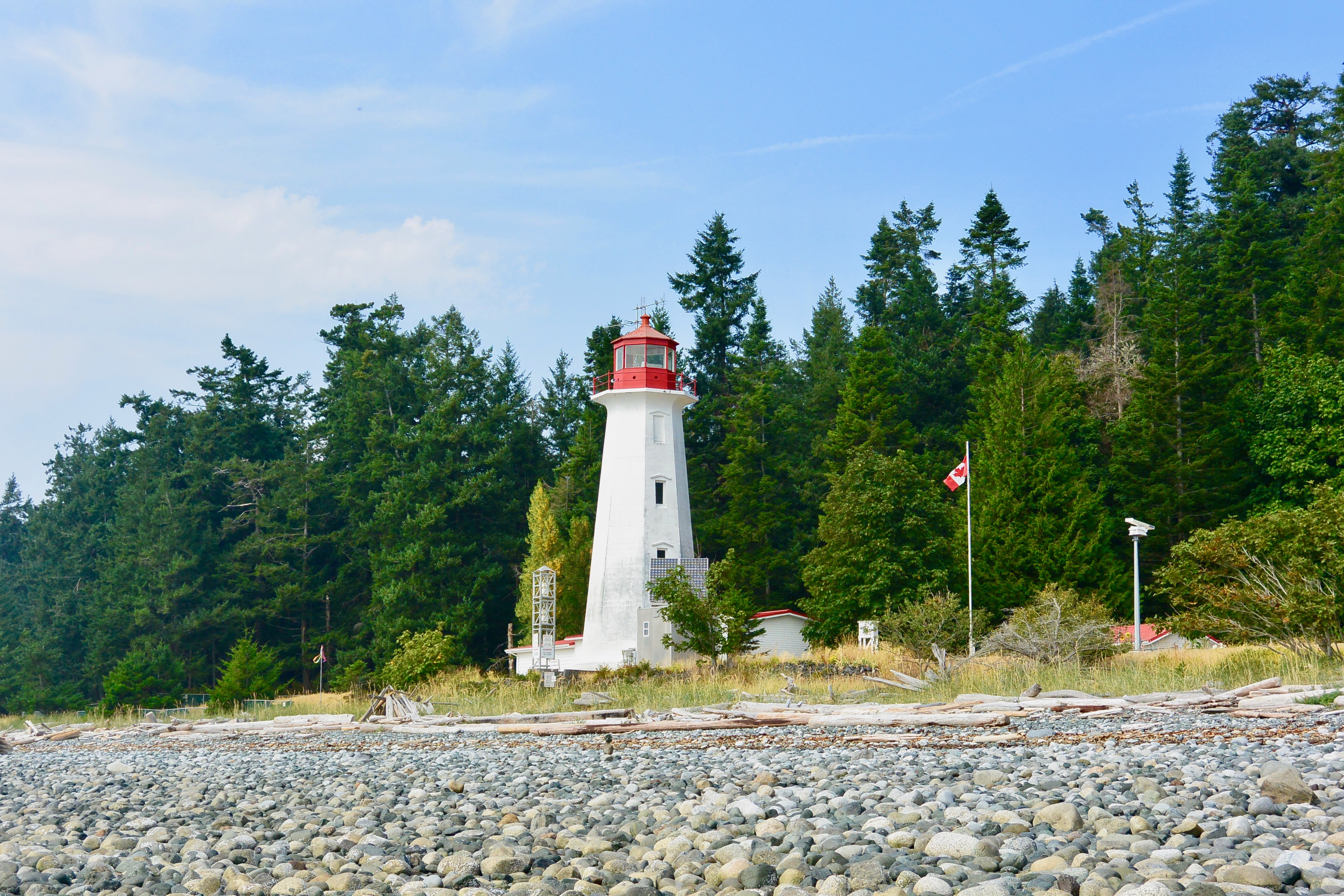
- Cape Mudge Lighthouse
- Location: Quadra Island; British Columbia; Canada
- Coordinates: 49°59′54.8″N 125°11′43.9″W

Tower
- Constructed: 1898 (first)
- Construction: concrete tower
- Height: 12 metres (39 ft)
- Shape: octagonal tower with balcony and lantern
- Markings: white tower, red balcony and lantern
- Operator: Canadian Coast Guard
- Heritage: heritage lighthouse

Light
- First lit: 1916 (current)
- Focal height: 17.5 metres (57 ft)
- Range: 13 nmi (24 km; 15 mi)
- Characteristic: F WR

Cape Mudge Lighthouse is located on Quadra Island which is off Campbell River, on the east coast of Vancouver Island, British Columbia, Canada.

Cape Mudge was named by Captain George Vancouver in 1792 after Zachary Mudge, who had served on HMS Discovery, and in 1796 on HMS Providence in this area.

Built in 1898, the original lighthouse was a wooden, two-storey building topped with a lantern on the roof. It later served as lighthouse assistant keeper's residence after the current lighthouse opened in 1916 and was demolished after 1949.

From 1936 to 1985, the Cape Mudge Lighthouse was part of the British Columbia Shore Station Oceanographic Program, collecting coastal water temperature and salinity measurements for the Department of Fisheries and Oceans everyday for 49 years.

== See also ==
- List of lighthouses in British Columbia
- List of lighthouses in Canada
