= Sheringham Point Light =

Lighthouse in British Columbia, Canada

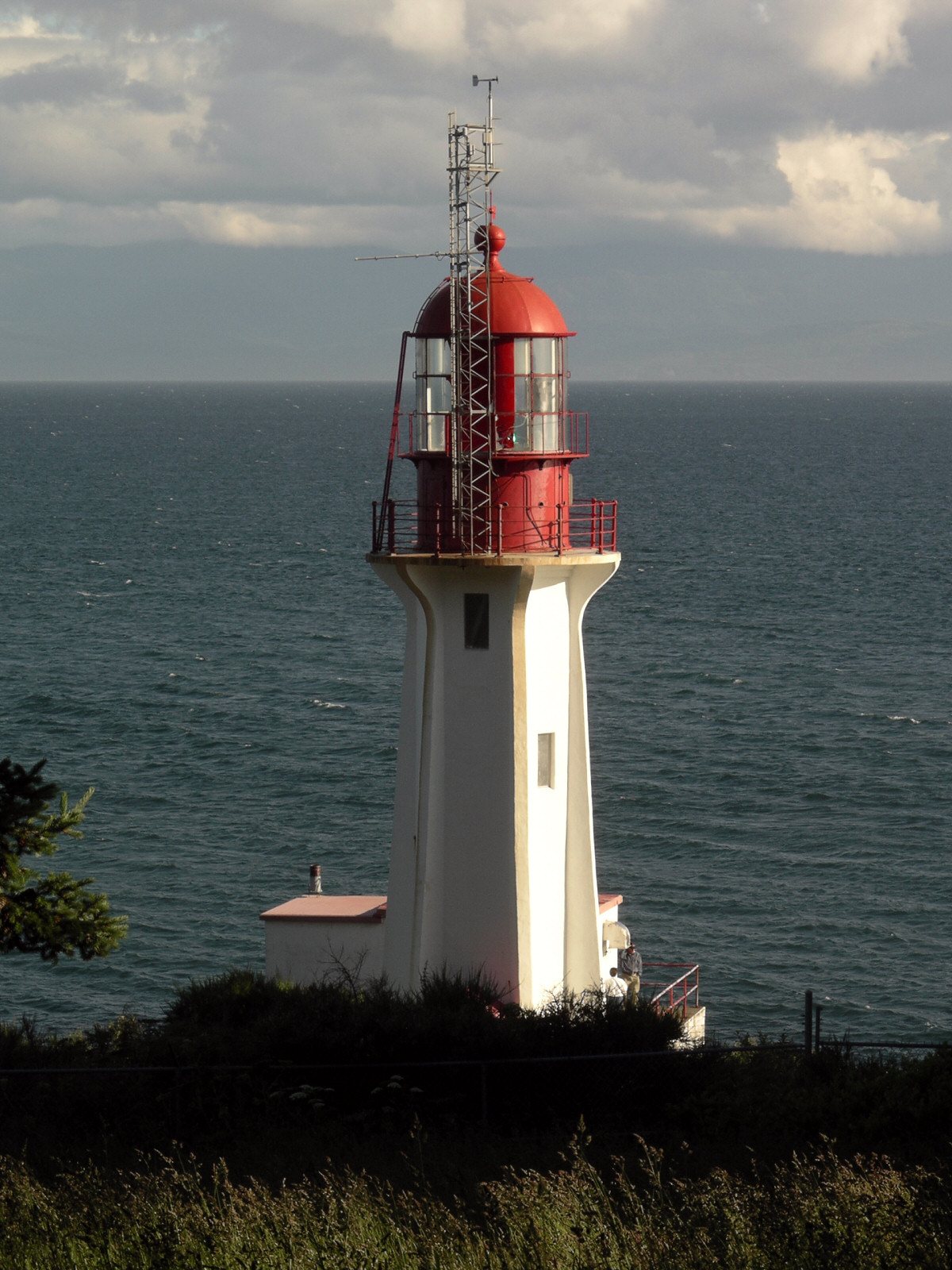
- Location: Sheringham Point; Vancouver Island; British Columbia; Canada
- Coordinates: 48°22′36.1″N 123°55′15.6″W

Tower
- Constructed: 1912
- Construction: concrete tower
- Automated: 1988
- Height: 19.5 metres (64 ft)
- Shape: hexagonal tower with balcony and lantern
- Markings: white tower, red balcony and lantern
- Operator: Sheringham Point Lighthouse Preservation Society
- Heritage: heritage lighthouse

Light
- Focal height: 22 metres (72 ft)
- Lens: Third-order Fresnel lens
- Range: 9 nmi (17 km; 10 mi)
- Characteristic: Fl G 15s.

Sheringham Point Lighthouse is located on the southwest coast of Vancouver Island, British Columbia, in the community of Shirley. Built in 1912 following the fatal wreck of the SS Valencia six years earlier, it is still used for navigation. The point was named for William L. Sheringham who took part in various naval surveys, although not in this area.

The federal government designated the Sheringham Point Lighthouse as a Heritage Lighthouse in 2015. The lighthouse and its surrounding lands are owned and operated by the Sheringham Point Lighthouse Preservation Society, and the site is open for the public to visit.

The lighthouse guides vessels as they enter the Strait of Juan de Fuca, which provides access from the Pacific Ocean to significant ports, including Vancouver and Victoria.

== History ==
The Strait of Juan de Fuca had become a strategic shipping channel by the early 20th century. In 1906 the steamship Valencia hit a reef after missing the entrance to the Strait resulting in the tragic loss of over 100 lives, which prompted an increase in aids to navigation on the southwest coast of Vancouver Island. Following its construction in 1912, Sheringham Point Lighthouse played a vital role in safeguarding water routes for many regional industries, including canneries, logging, and mining.

In 2010, the Canadian Department of Fisheries and Oceans (DFO) officially declared the lightstation and surrounding lands surplus. Sheringham Point Lighthouse was designated a Heritage Lighthouse on 16 April 2015. Ownership of the lighthouse and two hectares around it was transferred to the Sheringham Point Lighthouse Preservation Society by the federal government in 2015, and the site was reopened in 2016.

=== Design features ===
According to Parks Canada, the Sheringham Point Lighthouse design combines functionality with pleasing aesthetic expression. The hexagonal reinforced-concrete tower has six buttresses that flare out to support the gallery and to provide resistance against the strong winds that blow along the coastline.

The Sheringham Point Lighthouse is a good example of the reinforced-concrete lighthouses designed by William P. Anderson, who was Chief Engineer at the Department of Marine and Fisheries during a period of innovation in lighthouse design and experimentation with a relatively new building material. The original 1912 lighthouse remains intact and in good condition, indicating that the design and materials used were suitable for the location.

The lighthouse's Fresnel lens lamp apparatus floated on a bed of mercury, and was kept rotating by a clockwork mechanism which was wound by the lightkeeper every three hours from dusk to dawn. It was replaced by modern equipment in 1976. A foghorn was added as an additional warning signal in 1925. After operating for 77 years, the lighthouse was de-staffed and automated in 1989.

=== Keepers ===
- Eustace Travanion Arden (1912 – 1946)
- Tom Charles Cross (1946)
- Alfred Dickenson (1946 – 1948)
- Thomas Westhead (1948 – )
- Frederick Arthur Mountain (1959 – 1968)
- James D. Bruton (1968 – 1987)
- Kurt Cehak (1987 – 1989)

== Reference mark ==
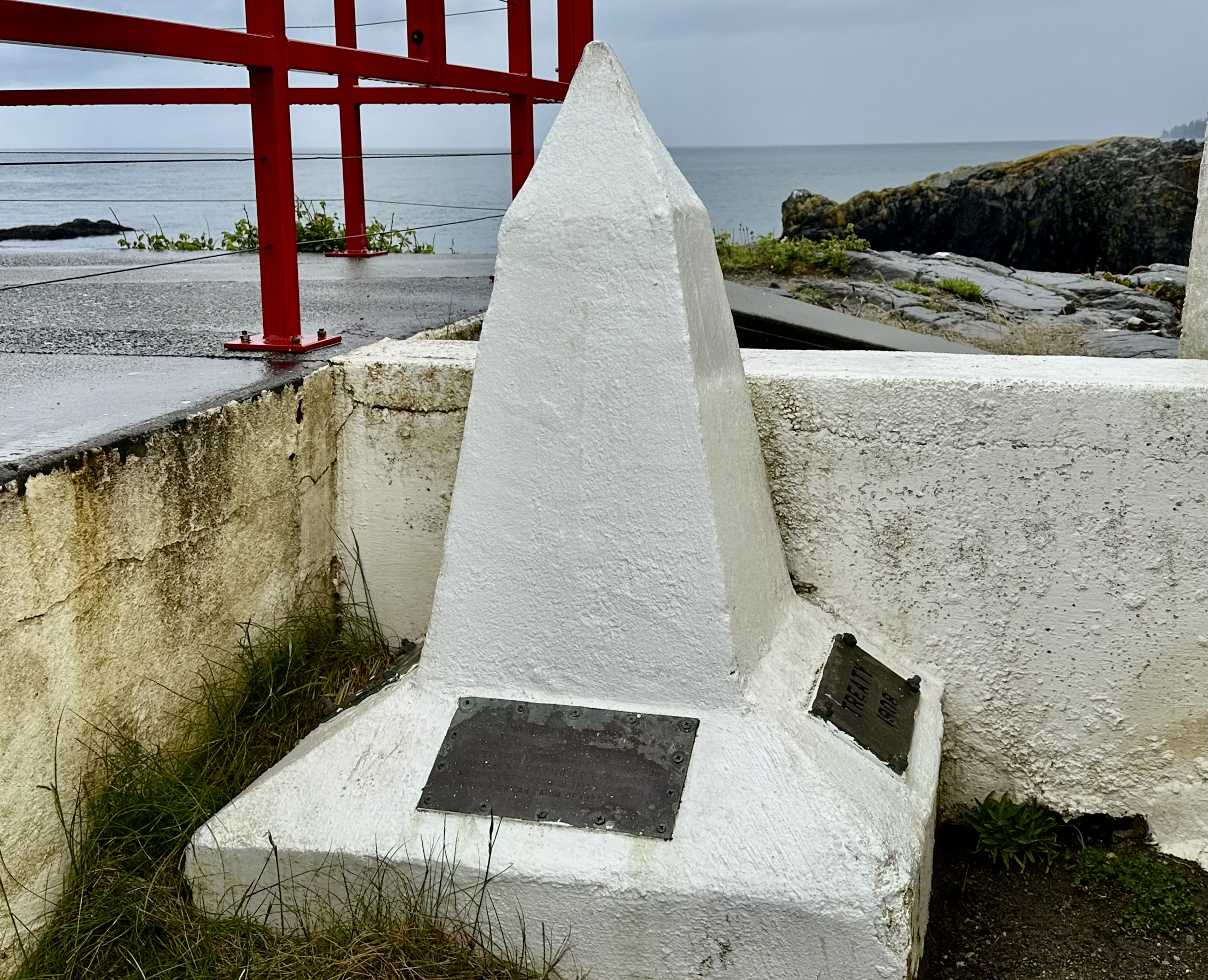
Reference marker at Sheringham Point Lighthouse

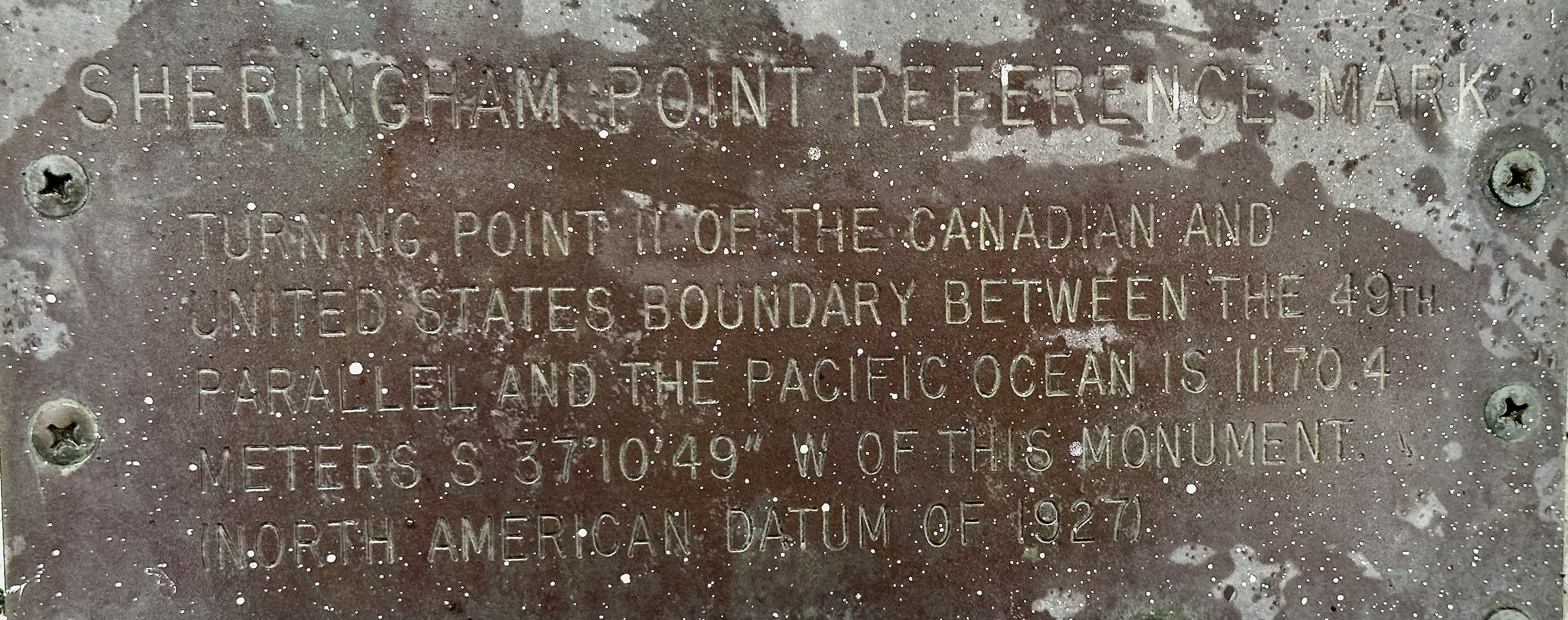
Plaque on the reference marker at Sheringham Point Lighthouse. It reads: "SHERINGHAM POINT REFERENCE MARK TURNING POINT II OF THE CANADIAN AND UNITED STATES BOUNDARY BETWEEN THE 49TH PARALLEL AND THE PACIFIC OCEAN IS 11170.4 METERS S 37°10'49" W OF THIS MONUMENT. (NORTH AMERICAN DATUM OF 1927)"

The lighthouse has a "reference mark" that indicates where a turning point in the border between Canada and the United States is located in the middle of Juan de Fuca Strait. In 1908, the International Boundary Commission agreed to re-survey the border using modern surveying techniques. This resulted in the installation of the reference marker.

== Oceanographic research ==
From 1968 to 1989, the Sheringham Point Light was part of the British Columbia Shore Station Oceanographic Program, collecting coastal water temperature and salinity measurements for the Department of Fisheries and Oceans everyday for 21 years.

== Sheringham Point Lighthouse Preservation Society ==
The Sheringham Point Lighthouse Preservation Society (SPLPS) was established in 2003 by local residents of Shirley, British Columbia, when the Canadian Coast Guard suggested deeming the Sheringham Point Lighthouse and its surrounding lands as 'surplus'. The SPLPS is a registered charity dedicated to preserving and protecting the Sheringham Point Lighthouse; to ensuring the lighthouse site remains safe and accessible to the public; and to documenting the lighthouse's historic significance and to making that information widely available.

On May 29, 2015, the minister responsible for Parks Canada, Leona Aglukkaq, announced that 74 heritage lighthouses across Canada had been designated under the Heritage Lighthouse Protection Act, with the Sheringham Point lighthouse designated on April 16, 2015. Meanwhile, the SPLPS and the Capital Regional District had been working together to acquire the station and lands to create a park accessible to the public.

In its work, the SPLPS had enlisted the help of former politician and "Canada's champion of lighthouses" Pat Carney, who was the featured speaker at the ceremony to recognize Sheringham Point Lighthouse's heritage designation on March 30, 2016.

In 2017, the largest ever private donation to a lighthouse in Canada was made by Ontario resident and lighthouse enthusiast Peter Westaway through the Westaway Charitable Foundation, which provided $550,000 over several years to assist with the Sheringham Point Lighthouse restoration.

== In popular culture ==
A former resident of Sheringham Point Lighthouse said the lighthouse was haunted by the ghost of Fred Mountain, a previous light-keeper who was, however, "such a nice man, you wouldn't have anything to worry about".

Sheringham Point Lighthouse was featured in the fourth episode of the Netflix series Dead Boy Detectives, titled "The Case of the Lighthouse Leapers."

== See also ==
- List of lighthouses in British Columbia
- List of lighthouses in Canada
- Henri de Miffonis
