= Ballenas Island Light =

Ballenas Island Lighthouse
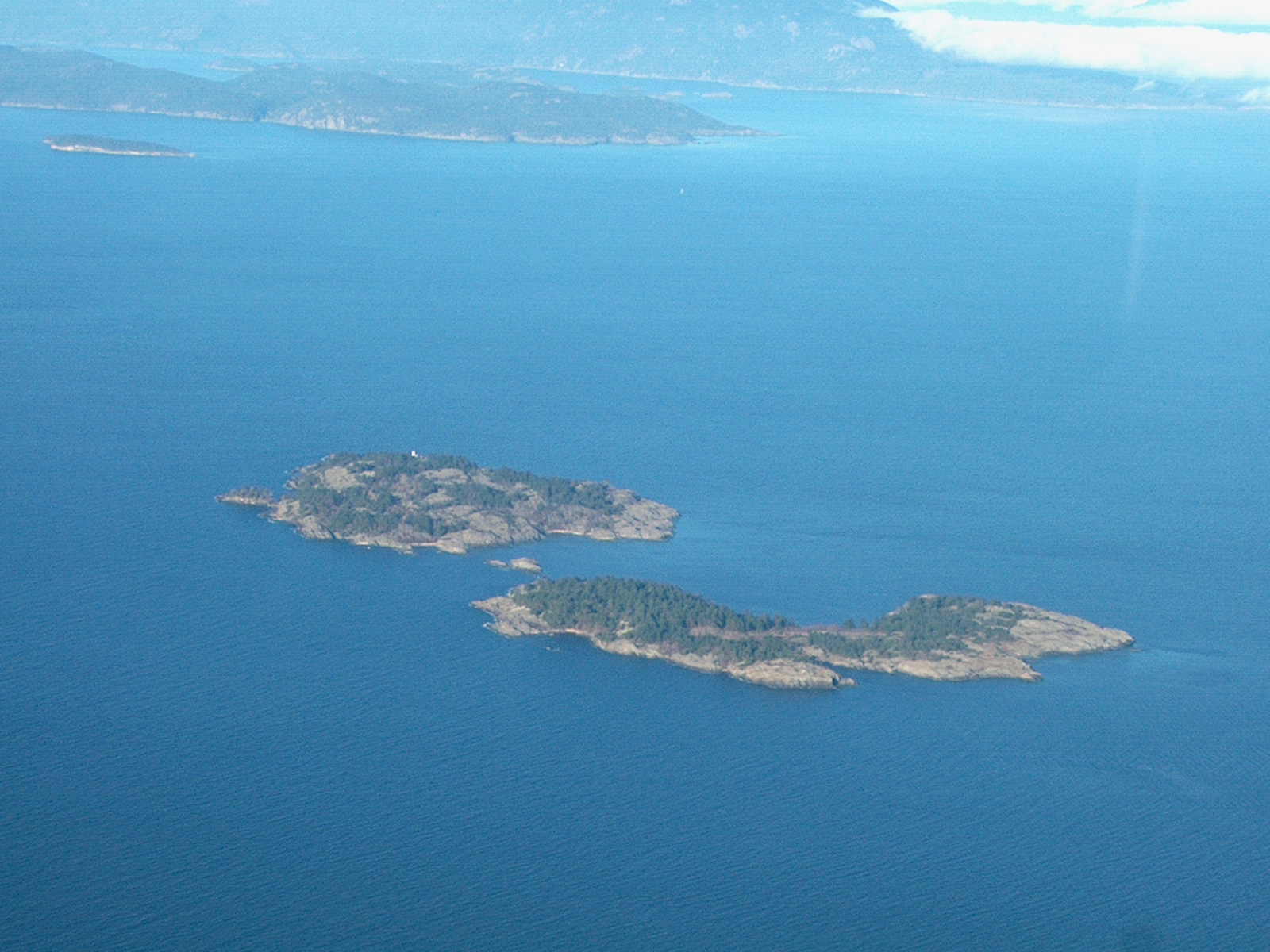
- Ballenas Island Light, far side of upper island
- Location: Ballenas Islands; British Columbia; Canada
- Coordinates: 49°21′2″N 124°9′36.8″W

Tower
- Constructed: 1900
- Construction: concrete tower
- Height: 11 metres (36 ft)
- Shape: octagonal tower with balcony and lantern
- Markings: white tower, red balcony and lantern
- Power source: solar power
- Operator: Canadian Coast Guard

Light
- First lit: 1917
- Focal height: 21 metres (69 ft)
- Range: 17 nautical miles (31 km; 20 mi)
- Characteristic: Fl W 10s.

The Ballenas Island Light is an operational lighthouse built in 1900 and moved to its current location in 1912, on West Ballenas Island, Canada. It is a white, octagonal concrete tower with a red lantern 27 metres (89 ft) in height. It is not open to the public as it is on a privately owned island.

== Keepers ==
- William Henry Brown (1901–11)
- Wilhelm Betiat (1911)
- T.C.L. Hayllar (1912)
- Arthur Broughton Gurney (1912–16)
- Mrs. A.B. Gurney (1917–19)
- Arthur Broughton Gurney (1920–21)
- Philip Gresely Cox (1921–22)
- Joseph Edgar Pettingell (1923–24)
- John Alfred Hunting (1924–30)
- Ernest Charles Dawe (1930–35)
- Alfred David Douglas (1935–37)
- Arthur G. Waldern (1952–57)
- Lance Hooper (early 1960s)
- Peter Fletcher (1966–70)
- Frederick Pratt (1970–89)
- J. Keith Nuttall (1989–93)
- Richard Wood (1994–96)

== See also ==
- List of lighthouses in British Columbia
- List of lighthouses in Canada
