= Ballenas Islands =

Islands in British Columbia, Canada

Coordinates: 49°21′02″N 124°09′36″W

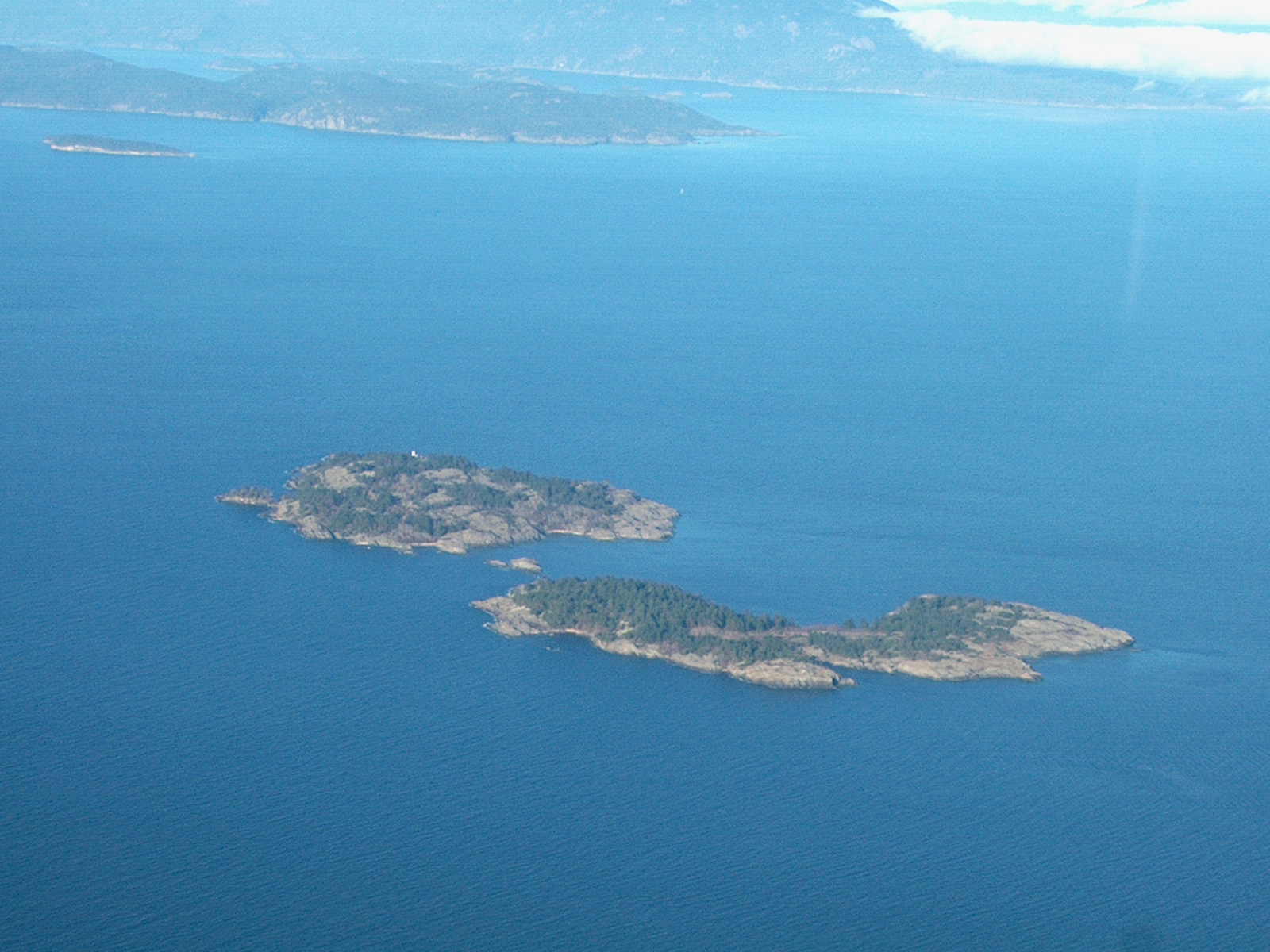
Ballenas Islands

The Ballenas Islands are a pair of islands in the Strait of Georgia off the coast of British Columbia, Canada. West Ballenas Island is a BC Provincial Park while South Ballenas Island remains Crown land held by the Government of Canada. The Ballenas Island Light is on the northern tip of West Ballenas Island.

The islands were named by Narvaez in 1791.
