= Triple Islands (British Columbia) =

Island group in British Columbia, Canada

- Interactive map of Triple Islands

Geography
- Location: North Coast of British Columbia
- Coordinates: 54°17′40″N 130°52′49″W
- Adjacent to: Pacific Ocean
- Total islands: 3

Administration
- Canada
- Province: British Columbia
- Regional district: North Coast Regional District

Additional information
- Site of the Triple Island Lightstation

The Triple Islands are a rocky archipelago off the northwestern coast of British Columbia near the entrance to Portland Inlet, noted for its role in maritime navigation off the North Coast of British Columbia. The archipelago is located about 40 km (25 mi) west of Prince Rupert, 6 kilometres (3.7 miles) southwest of Melville Island, off the northern tip of Stephens Island.

The largest island hosts the Triple Island Lightstation and a helipad (IATA: YTI).
