= Chrome Island Lighthouse =

Lighthouse in British Columbia, Canada

Chrome Island lighthouse
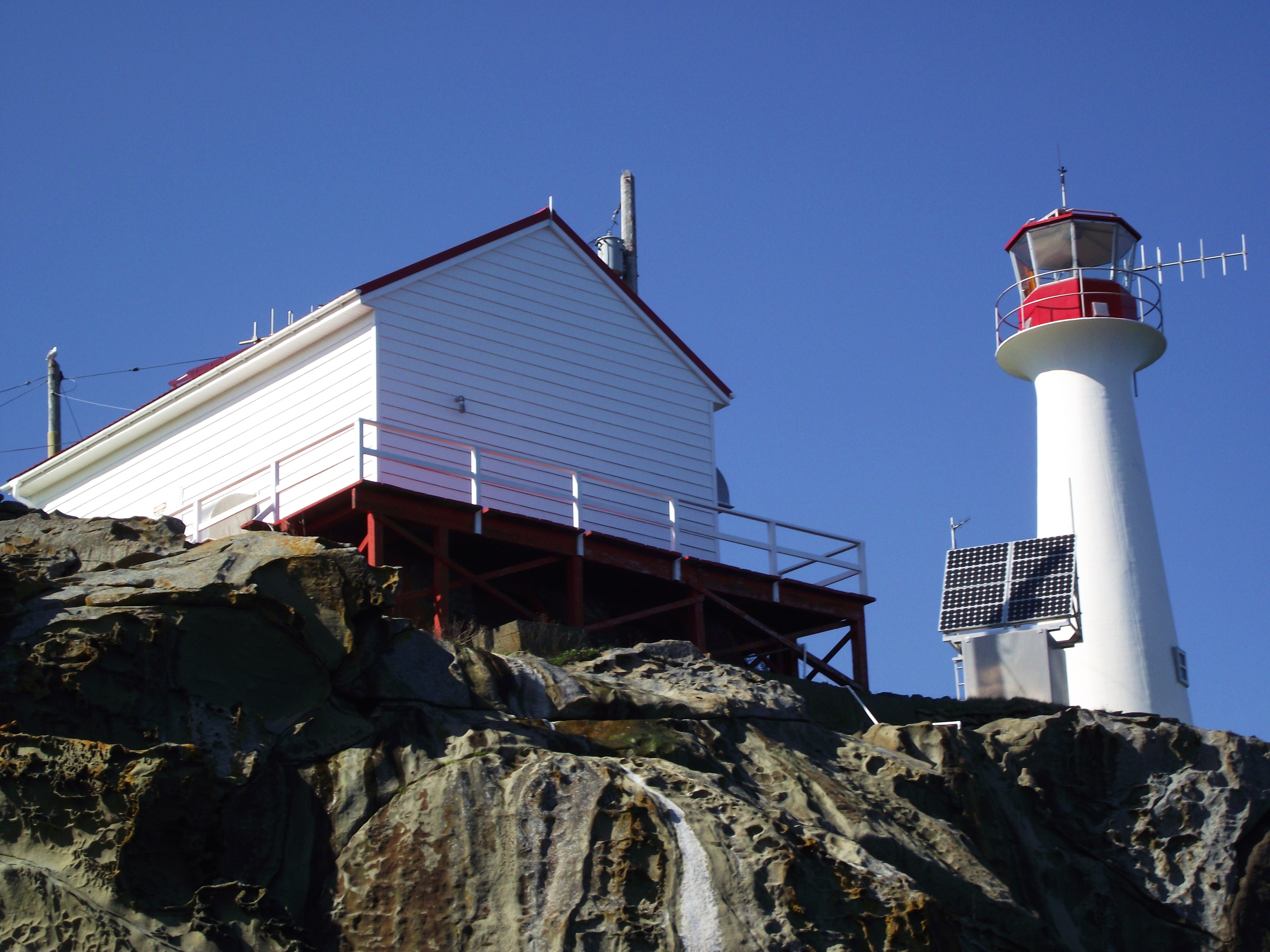
- The lighthouse in 2012
- Location: Denman Island; British Columbia; Canada
- Coordinates: 49°28′19.49″N 124°41′2.18″W

Tower
- Constructed: 1891 (first)
- Construction: fiberglass tower
- Height: 7.5 metres (25 ft)
- Shape: cylindrical tower with balcony and lantern
- Markings: white tower, red lantern
- Power source: solar power
- Operator: Canadian Coast Guard

Light
- First lit: 1989 (current)
- Focal height: 22 metres (72 ft)
- Characteristic: Fl W 5s.

Chrome Island Lighthouse is a light station established in 1891 that assists traffic in the region of Deep Bay, British Columbia, Denman Island, and Hornby Island. It is currently a staffed station, though in recent years the Canadian Coast Guard has considered automating it.

Along with electronic navigational aids, the five-second-flash lighthouse is about 21 metres (69 ft) above water level (depending on tides). The station has a helicopter landing deck and rescue boat.

The light is one of the 12 locations of the British Columbia Shore Station Oceanographic Program, and has collected coastal water temperature and salinity measurements for the Department of Fisheries and Oceans since 1961.

== Keepers ==
- Tom H. Piercy 1891–1898
- William McDonagh 1898–1901
- Walter Gordon 1901–1906
- John Doney 1906–1914
- James Fredrick Street 1914–1917
- Albert Doney 1917–1919
- Daniel O'Brien 1919–1922
- G. Allan Couldery 1922–1939
- Eugene Alexander Moden 1939–1953
- Oscar Edwards 1953–1957
- D.P. Gardner 1957–1960
- Jim W. Bruton 1960–1964
- William Edward Gardiner 1964–1977
- Maurice Collette 1977–1979
- Gerald Watson 1979–1980
- Terrance Stewart 1980–1985
- Charles Thomson 1986–1997
- Barry Shaw 1997–1998
- Charles Thomson 1998–2007
- Roger Williamson 2007–present

== See also ==
- List of lighthouses in British Columbia
- List of lighthouses in Canada
