= Shirley, British Columbia =

Locality in British Columbia, Canada

Coordinates: 48.383333°N 123.9°W

Shirley is an unincorporated locality on the southwest coast of Vancouver Island, in British Columbia. Its local government is the Juan de Fuca Electoral Area, which is part of the Capital Regional District.

== Geography ==
Shirley is located 57 kilometres west of Victoria, on Highway 14 between Sooke and Port Renfrew. The Strait of Juan de Fuca lies south of Shirley, and Kirby Creek runs through the community.

== History ==
Settlement in the Shirley area increased after British Columbia joined Canada in 1871. The Shirley Post Office was opened 1 May 1894, with the name being suggested by Mrs. G. Clark, wife of the postmaster Edwin Clark, after her native town near Southampton, England.

== Population ==
In 2021, the population of Jordan River/Shirley was 485.

== Notable features ==
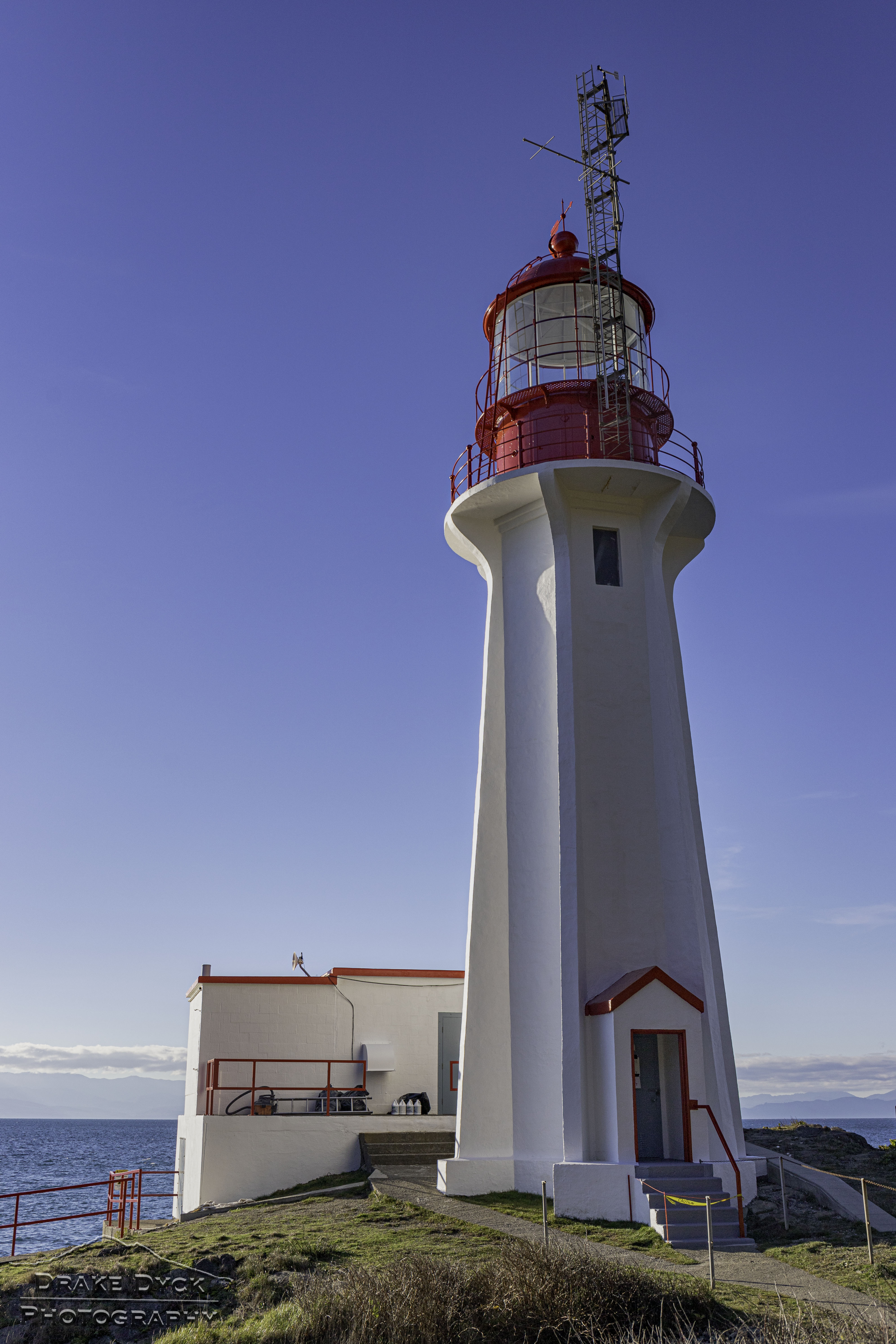
Sheringham Point Lighthouse, Shirley, British Columbia

Sheringham Point Lighthouse, a Parks Canada Heritage designated lighthouse, is located in Shirley.

The local Shirley Delicious cafe has been reviewed by national and international publications including The Huffington Post, The Guardian, and The New York Times.

== Services ==
Shirley has a 90-year-old community hall, a fire hall, and a volunteer fire department. The community obtained cellular service in 2023.
