= Carmanah Point Light Station =

Lighthouse in British Columbia, Canada

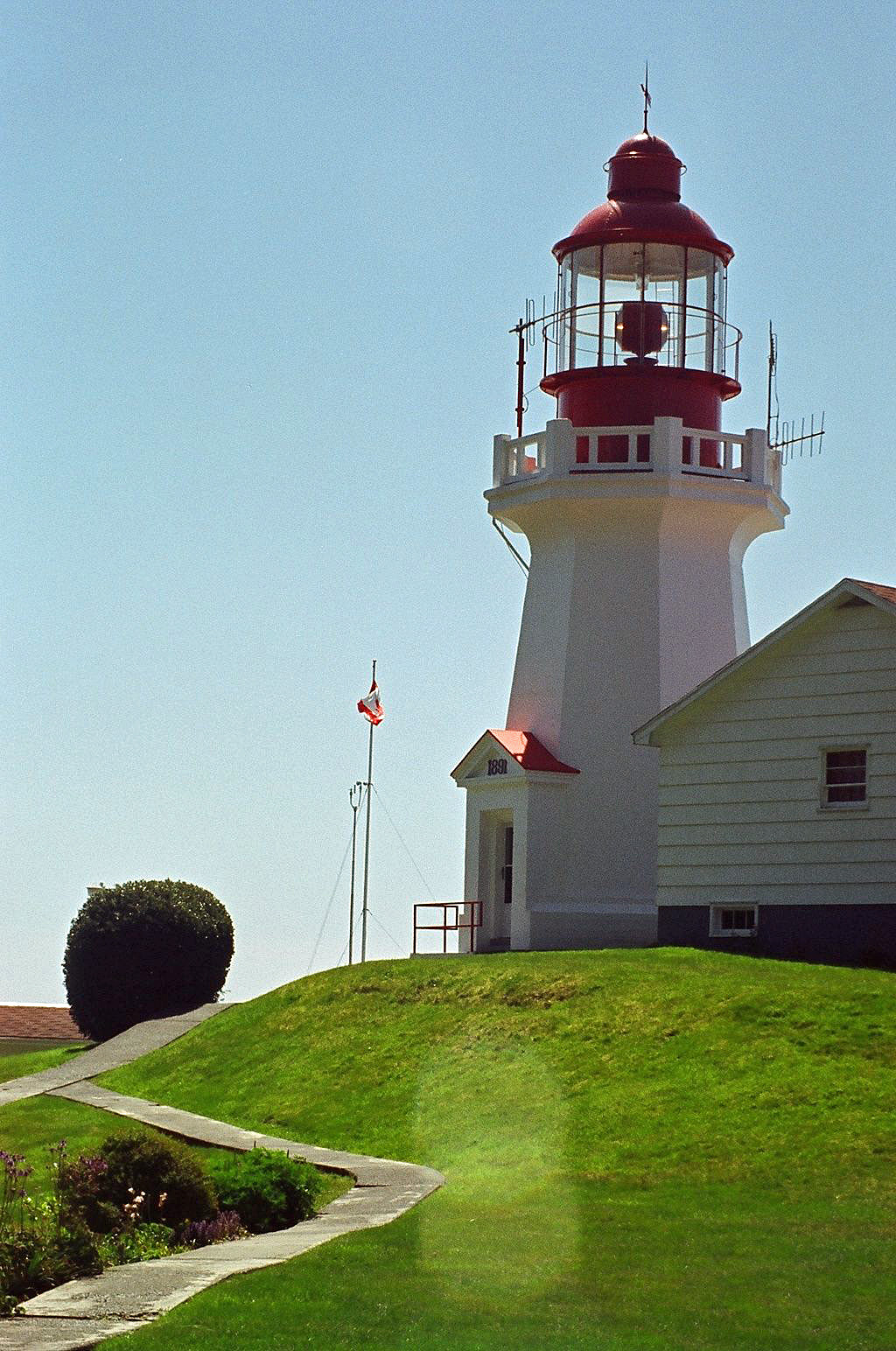
- Location: Carmanah Point; British Columbia; Canada
- Coordinates: 48°36′42.1″N 124°45′04.7″W

Tower
- Constructed: 1891 (first)
- Construction: concrete tower
- Height: 11 metres (36 ft)
- Shape: octagonal tower with balcony and lantern
- Markings: white tower, red lantern house
- Operator: Canadian Coast Guard
- Heritage: recognized federal heritage building of Canada, heritage lighthouse

Light
- First lit: 1920 (current)
- Focal height: 55.5 metres (182 ft)
- Range: 37 kilometres (23 mi)
- Characteristic: Fl W 5 s.

Carmanah Point Light Station is a lighthouse on the southwest coast of Vancouver Island at the entrance to the Pacific Ocean from the Strait of Juan de Fuca in the Salish Sea.

== History ==
The Carmanah Point Light Station was established in 1891. The first light was built of wood and was attached to the keeper's housing. The present tower was built in 1920 of concrete and remains in operation. The area is said to be named for the upstream Nitinaht village. It is said the name means "thus far upstream".

In the summer of 2024, Fisheries and Oceans along with the Coast Guard announced that the light station was seismically unstable and would be destaffed before the end of the year. On October 25, the lightkeepers were removed from the station. The decision to destaff the station has been met with heavy criticism from various local authorities, including local governments, indigenous leadership, and industry leaders.

== Keepers ==
- William Phillip Daykin 1891–1912)
- George Woodley 1912
- Robert S. Daykin 1912–1917
- James W. Davies 1917–1924
- Thomas A. McNabb 1924–1930, 1944
- John Alfred Hunting 1930–1931
- Henry Seymour Briggs 1931–1934
- Henry I. McKenzie 1935
- G.M. Clark 1935
- William Charles Copeland 1935–1940
- Walter Calverly, 1940–1941
- F.A. Mountain 1941–1946
- Francis George Copeland 1946–1952
- G.D. Wellard 1952–1958
- Bert Pearce 1964–1969
- Arthur Britton 1970–1976
- Robert W. Noble 1976–1979
- Don DeRousic 1979–1983
- Dieter Losel 1983–1986
- Jerry K. Etzkorn 1986–2016
- Justine J. Etzkorn 2016-2025

== See also ==
- List of lighthouses in British Columbia
- Gibbs, Jim, Lighthouses of the Pacific, Philadelphia 1986 Schiffer ISBN 0-88740-054-X
- List of lighthouses in Canada
