= Entrance Island (British Columbia) =

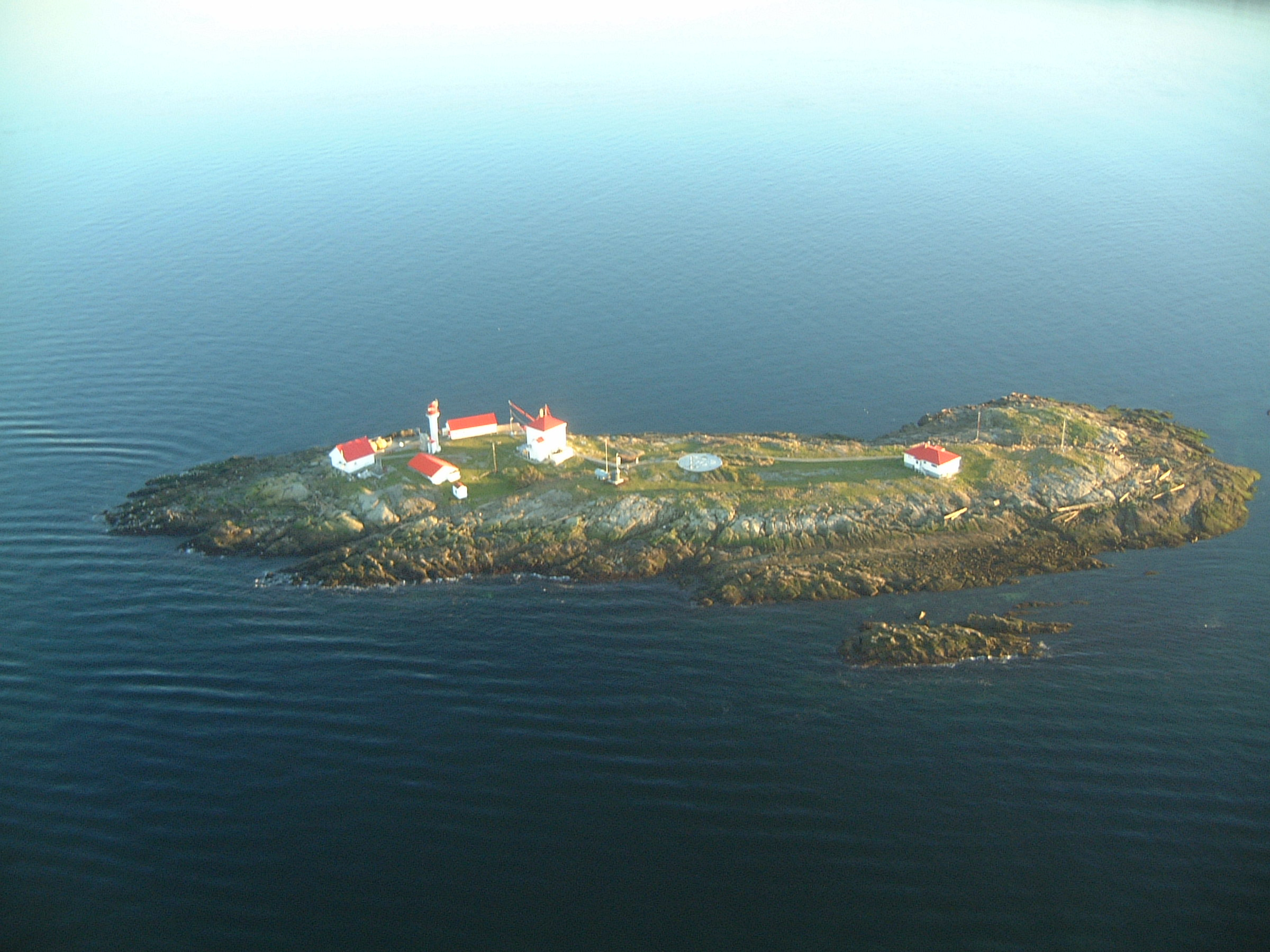
Entrance Island, BC

Entrance Island is a small rocky island in the Strait of Georgia, British Columbia, Canada, 841 metres (2,759 ft) due north of Gabriola Island. Marine mammals such as harbour seals and Steller's sea lions use it as a haul-out.

== Entrance Island Lighthouse ==
Entrance Island Lighthouse
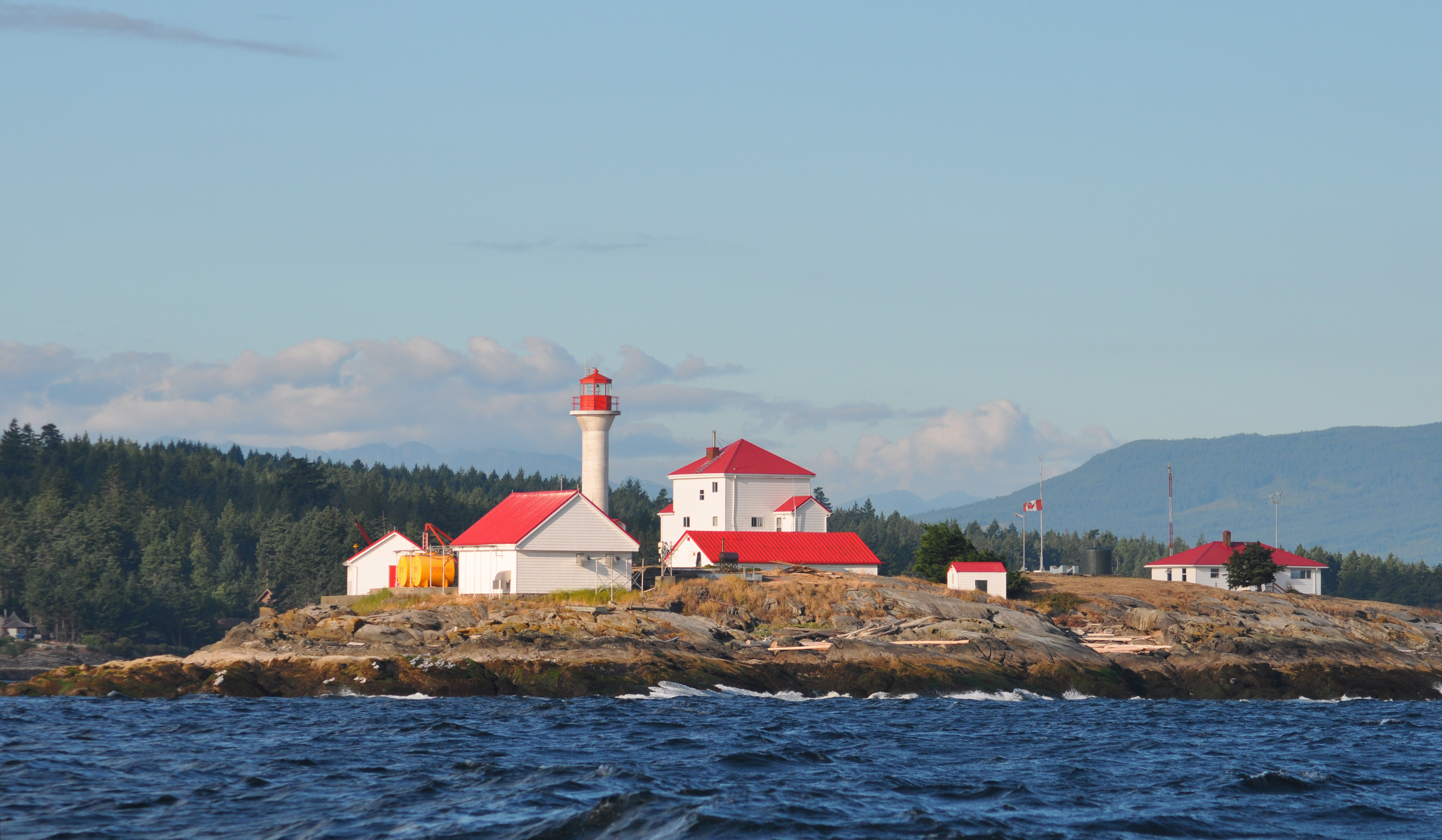
- Entrance Island Light off Gabriola Island, Georgia Strait, British Columbia
- Location: Gabriola Island; Strait of Georgia; British Columbia; Canada
- Coordinates: 49.209214°N 123.808105°W

Tower
- Constructed: 1986 (first)
- Construction: concrete tower (current) wooden tower (first)
- Height: 14 metres (46 ft)
- Shape: cylindrical tower with balcony and lantern (current) square tower
- Markings: white tower, red balcony and lantern
- Power source: solar power
- Operator: Canadian Coast Guard
- Heritage: heritage lighthouse

Light
- First lit: 1970 (current)
- Focal height: 19 metres (62 ft)
- Range: 15 nmi (28 km; 17 mi)
- Characteristic: Fl W 5s.

The Entrance Island Lighthouse is a staffed light station built in 1876 to guide ships into the Nanaimo harbour from the Strait of Georgia. Construction began in 1875, but was plagued with problems including the deaths of three workers and the original contractor abandoning the incomplete structure. Construction was finished a year behind schedule in 1876. Two of the early lighthouse keepers - M.G. Clark and W.E. Morrisey - earned a measure of notoriety for mistreatment of assistants hired to tend the lighthouse.

In 2009, the Canadian Coast Guard announced that the Entrance Island lighthouse would be destaffed as part of a nation-wide cost-saving measure. Following protests and a senate committee hearing, the plan was dropped.

The lighthouse is easily seen from the Horseshoe Bay to Departure Bay ferry. The Tsawwassen to Duke Point ferry passes right by it.

The lighthouse and its five related buildings - both dwellings, the winch house, the boat house, and the engine room - were declared to be a Heritage Lighthouse in 2015.

=== Oceanographic research ===
The Entrance Island Lighthouse is one of 12 lighthouses part of the British Columbia Shore Station Oceanographic Program, collecting coastal water temperature and salinity measurements everyday since 1936. Their data show an increase in coastal water temperatures of 0.15 °C per decade. This trend is believed to be a result of anthropogenic climate change.

== See also ==
- List of lighthouses in British Columbia
- List of lighthouses in Canada
