= Brown Passage =

Ocean channel in British Columbia, Canada

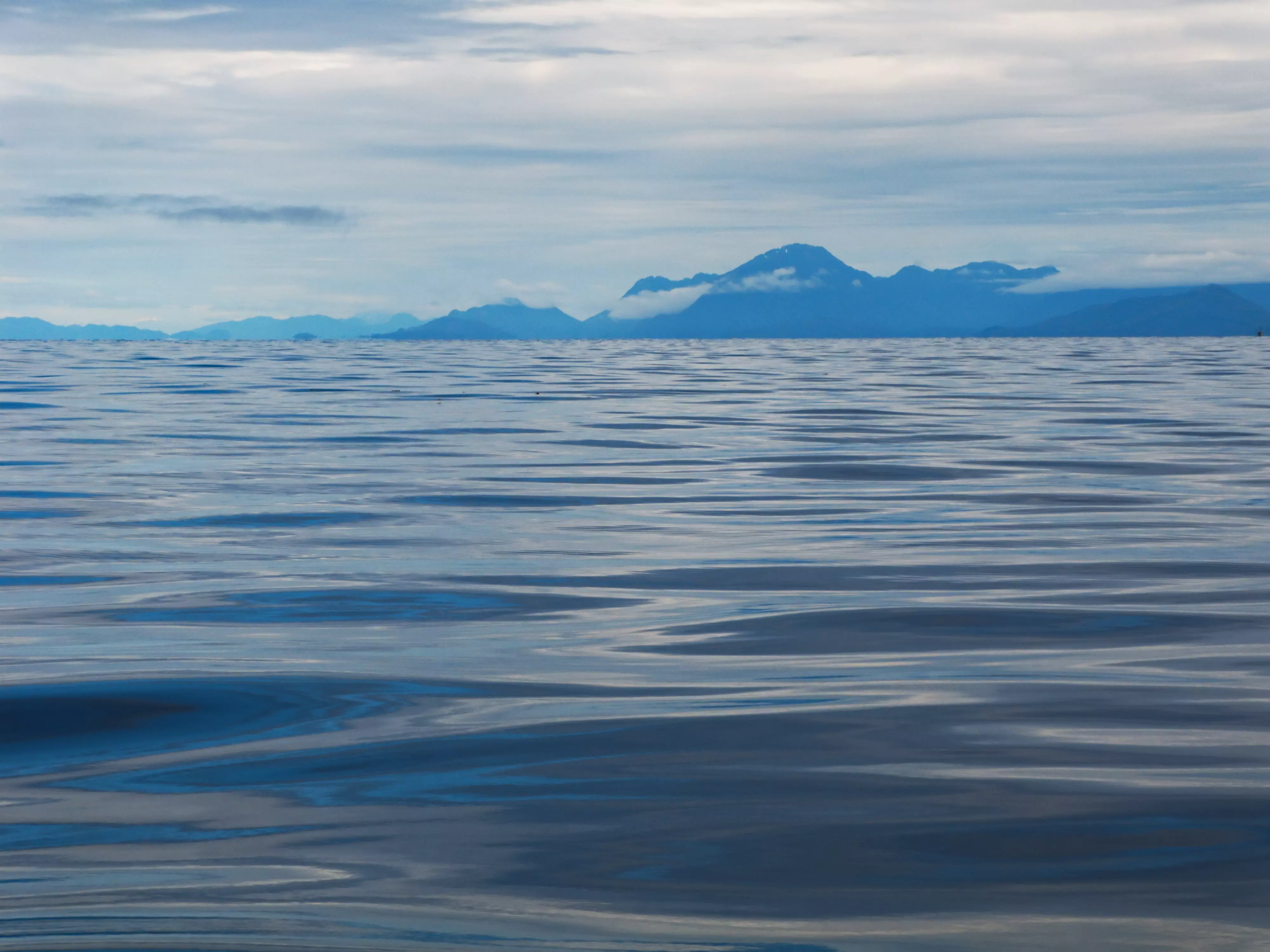
- Looking northward across Brown Passage.webp

- Location within British Columbia
- Location: British Columbia, Canada
- Coordinates: 54°19′24″N 130°48′42″W
- Etymology: Captain William Brown
- Max. length: 29 km (18 mi)
- Max. width: 20.7 km (12.9 mi)
- Max. depth: over 200 metres (660 ft)

Brown Passage is a deep ocean channel connecting the western offshore waters of Hecate Strait and Dixon Entrance on the Pacific continental shelf with the eastern inland waters of Chatham Sound in the North Coast of British Columbia, Canada.

Located between Dundas and Stephens Islands, the passage is part of the main commercial approach to Prince Rupert. The western entrance is guarded by the Triple Island Lighthouse. On average, Brown Passage sees 18 cargo vessel and tanker transits per week; during the summer cruise ship season, an additional 28 transits per week are expected.

== Etymology ==
Brown Passage was named in July 1793 by Captain Vancouver, after Captain William Brown, of the Butterworth (also leading two other vessels), which met with Vancouver at the north end of Stephens Island on 21 July 1793.
