= List of lighthouses in British Columbia =

This is a list of lighthouses in the province of British Columbia, Canada.

== Lighthouses ==
| Name | Image and map | Water body | Region | Location | Built | Notes |
|---|---|---|---|---|---|---|
| Active Pass Lighthouse | List of lighthouses in British Columbia is located in British Columbia | | | | 1885 | |
| Addenbroke Island Light Station | List of lighthouses in British Columbia is located in British Columbia | Fitz Hugh Sound | 100 km north of Port Hardy | Addenbroke Island, on the eastern side of Fitz Hugh Sound. | 1914 | The structure consists of a Fibreglass tower that is 26 ft tall and painted white. The active focal plane is 24 metres above sea level. It flashes white every 5 seconds. This is a staffed light house. There are two keepers in adjacent structures. |
| Amphitrite Point Light | List of lighthouses in British Columbia is located in British Columbia | Barkley Sound | Barkley Sound, northern entrance | Ucluelet, southern end | 1915 | The building is white with a red lantern. It flashes every 12 seconds and has a focal plane of 15 metres (50 ft). The original structure was destroyed by a tsunami in 1914 and rebuilt in 1915. |
| Ballenas Island Light | List of lighthouses in British Columbia is located in British Columbia | | | | 1917 | |
| Boat Bluff Lighthouse | List of lighthouses in British Columbia is located in British Columbia | Hecate Strait | Sarah Passage | | 1897 (station established) | This light is located around 5 kilometres north of the village of Klemtu. It is there to mark the northbound entrance to Sarah Passage and is situated on the west side of Sarah Island. The light itself is a tower, square pyramidal in shape and made of steel. The tower is white and the square base is red. This is a staffed light consisting of a number of structures and a weather station. |
| Brockton Point Lighthouse | List of lighthouses in British Columbia is located in British Columbia | | | | 1915 | |
| Cape Beale Lighthouse | List of lighthouses in British Columbia is located in British Columbia | Barkley Sound | Pacific Rim National Park Reserve | Pacific Rim National Park Reserve | 1958 | This light is used to mark the southern entrance to Barkley Sound. It is a square pyrimidal tower made of steel. This skeletal structure has a square cylinder in the center. There is a lantern and gallery, both painted red. Three sides have a white, slatted daymark. This light is staffed and consists of a number of buildings, all with red roofs. |
| Cape Mudge Lighthouse | List of lighthouses in British Columbia is located in British Columbia | | | | 1916 | |
| Cape Scott Lighthouse | List of lighthouses in British Columbia is located in British Columbia | Pacific Ocean | Vancouver Island, northwestern tip | Cape Scott Provincial Park | 1981 | The light is a square skeletal structure. It is made of steel and has a red painted lantern and a gallery. The focal plane is 70 metres (229 feet) and flashes white every 10 seconds. The site consists of a number of red-roofed buildings. |
| Carmanah Point Light Station | List of lighthouses in British Columbia is located in British Columbia | | | | 1920 | |
| Chrome Island Lighthouse | List of lighthouses in British Columbia is located in British Columbia | | | | 1890 | |
| Discovery Island Light | List of lighthouses in British Columbia is located in British Columbia | | | | 1885 | |
| Entrance Island Lighthouse | List of lighthouses in British Columbia is located in British Columbia | | | | 1970 (circa) | |
| Estevan Point | List of lighthouses in British Columbia is located in British Columbia | | | | 1910 | |
| Fisgard Lighthouse | List of lighthouses in British Columbia is located in British Columbia | | | | 1860 | The oldest lighthouse on the West Coast of Canada. |
| Green Island Lighthouse | List of lighthouses in British Columbia is located in British Columbia | | | | 1906 (station established) | |
| Ivory Island Lightstation | List of lighthouses in British Columbia is located in British Columbia | | | | 1898 | |
| Langara Light | List of lighthouses in British Columbia is located in British Columbia | | | | 1913 | |
| Lucy Islands Light | List of lighthouses in British Columbia is located in British Columbia | | | | 1960 | |
| Merry Island Lighthouse | List of lighthouses in British Columbia is located in British Columbia | Halfmoon Bay 49.467448°N 123.912313°W | | | 1903 | |
| Mayne Island Lighthouse | List of lighthouses in British Columbia is located in British Columbia | | | | | |
| Nootka Lighthouse | List of lighthouses in British Columbia is located in British Columbia | Nootka Sound | west coast of Vancouver Island | summit of San Rafael Island at entrance to Nootka Sound. | 1910 | Red square skeleton tower. Active focal plane at 30.9 metres. It flashes white 0.2 seconds every 12 seconds. |
| Pachena Point Light | List of lighthouses in British Columbia is located in British Columbia | | | | 1908 | |
| Point Atkinson Lighthouse | List of lighthouses in British Columbia is located in British Columbia | | | | 1912 | |
| Portlock Point Lighthouse | List of lighthouses in British Columbia is located in British Columbia | | | | 1987 | |
| Race Rocks Lighthouse | List of lighthouses in British Columbia is located in British Columbia | | | | 1860 | The second oldest lighthouse on the West Coast of Canada. |
| Sangster Island Light | List of lighthouses in British Columbia is located in British Columbia | | | | | |
| Scarlett Point Lighthouse | List of lighthouses in British Columbia is located in British Columbia | | | | 1905 (station established) | |
| Sheringham Point Lighthouse | List of lighthouses in British Columbia is located in British Columbia | | | | 1912 | |
| Trial Islands Lightstation | List of lighthouses in British Columbia is located in British Columbia | | | | 1906 | |
| Triple Island Lightstation | List of lighthouses in British Columbia is located in British Columbia | Chatham Sound | North Coast Regional District | Brown Passage; 25 miles (40 km) W of Prince Rupert | 1920 | A 21.9 metres (72 ft) tower attached to a rectangular concrete structure with a helipad (IATA: YTI). Designated a National Historic Site of Canada in 1974. |

== See also ==
- List of lighthouses in Canada
