= British Columbia Shore Station Oceanographic Program =

Water temperature and salinity monitoring program

Lightstations part of the British Columbia Shore Station Oceanographic Program.

The British Columbia Shore Station Oceanographic Program is a sea surface temperature and salinity monitoring program on the Canadian coast of the northeast Pacific Ocean. The program is administered by Fisheries and Oceans Canada, and regroups 12 lighthouse stations in British Columbia. Most lighthouses are staffed by the Department of Fisheries and Oceans, but some have independent contractors instead.

The practice of recording ocean water temperature and salinity levels in the area was initiated in 1914 at the Pacific Biological Station in Nanaimo. Data is collected daily around the time of the daytime high tide. The methodology of the sampling was originally designed by oceanographer John P. Tully, and was never modified in order to maintain the homogeneity of the data. The program expanded to 12 stations in the 1930s. Over time, more stations joined the program while others stopped reporting. Currently, twelve stations remain in the program.

Data from the Amphitrite point and Kains Island lightstations, which started reporting in the mid-1930s, show an increase in coastal water temperatures of 0.08 °C per decade. On the other hand, data from the Entrance Island station, which started reporting around the same time, show an increase in coastal water temperatures of 0.15°C per decade. These trends are a result of anthropogenic climate change.

The stations currently being monitored as part of the program are:

Lightstation / location	Active since
Amphitrite point lightstation	1934
Bonilla island lightstation	1960
Chrome island lightstation	1961
Departure bay (PBS)	1914
Egg island lightstation	1970
Entrance island lightstation	1936
Kains island lightstation	1935
Langara point lightstation	1936
Mcinnes island lightstation	1954
Nootka point lightstation	1934
Pine island lightstation	1937
Race Rocks Light	1921

== See also ==
- Oceanography
- CCGS John P. Tully
- List of lighthouses in British Columbia
