= List of lighthouses in Canada =

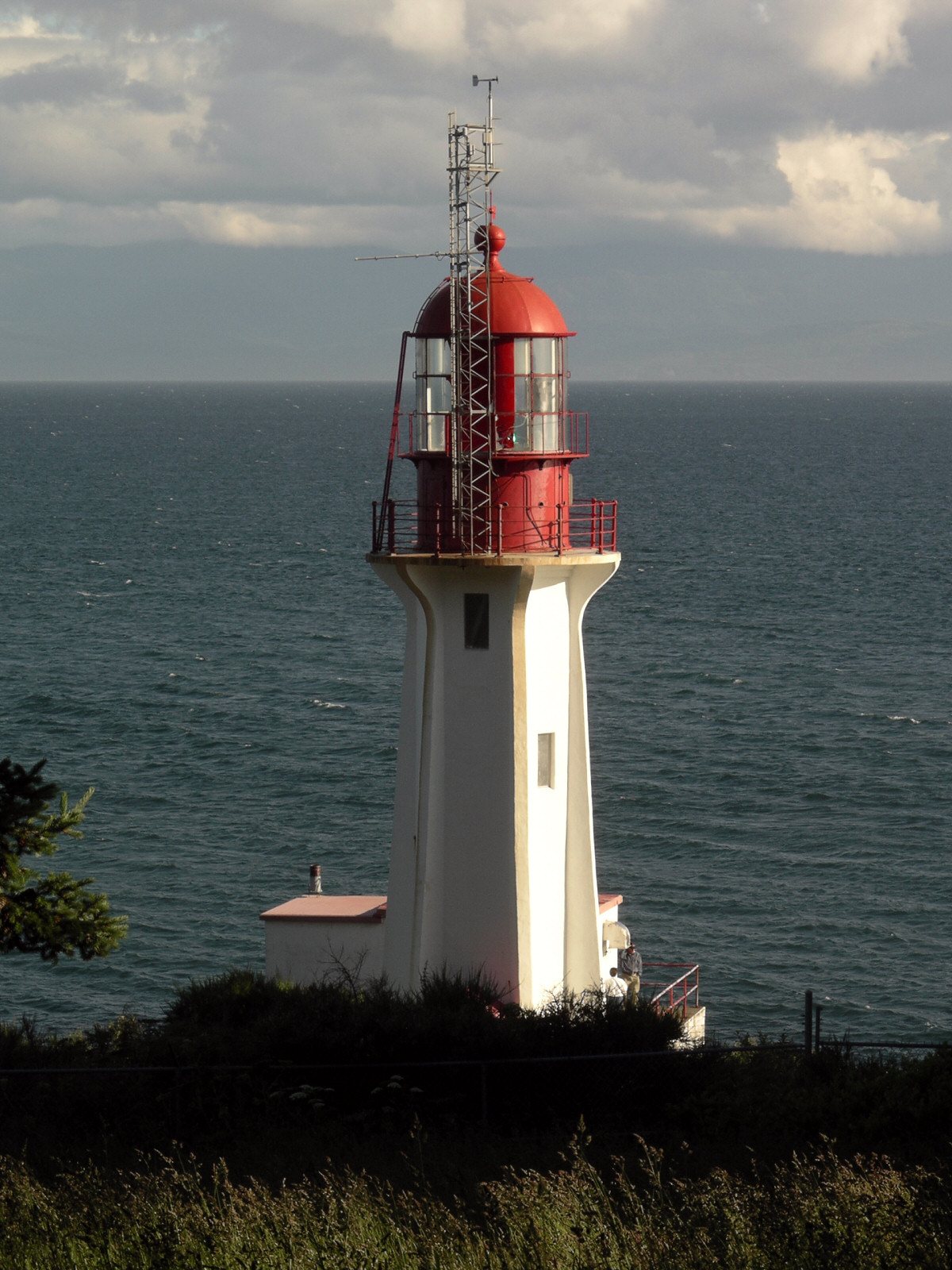
Sheringham Point Lighthouse

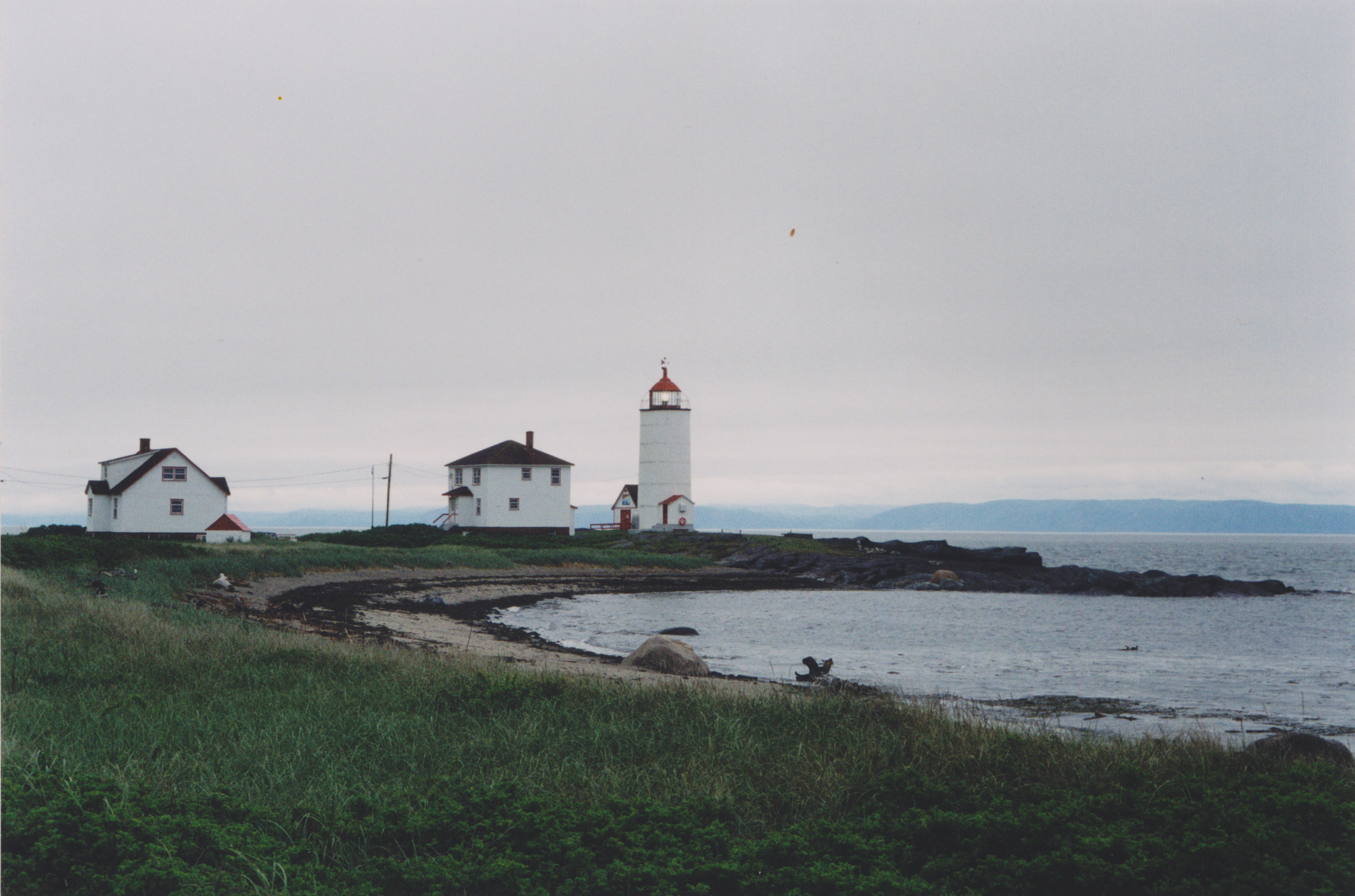
Green Island Lighthouse, St. Lawrence middle estuary

This is a list of lighthouses in Canada. These may naturally be divided into lighthouses on the Pacific coast, on the Arctic Ocean, in the Hudson Bay watershed, on the Labrador Sea and Gulf of St. Lawrence, in the St. Lawrence River watershed (including the Great Lakes), and on the Atlantic seaboard.

== British Columbia ==
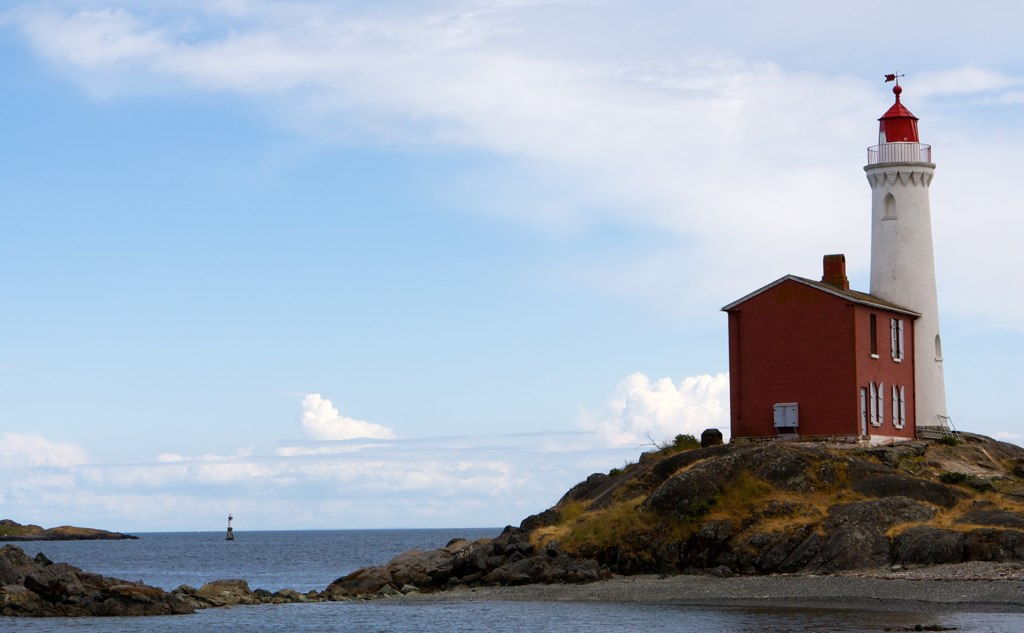
Fisgard Light

- Active Pass Lighthouse
- Addenbroke Island Lightstation
- Amphitrite Point Lighthouse
- Boat Bluff lighthouse
- Bonilla Island Lightstation
- Brockton Point Lightstation
- Cape Beale Lightstation
- Cape Mudge Lighthouse
- Cape Scott Lighthouse
- Carmanah Point Light Station
- Chatham Point lighthouse
- Chrome Island Lightstation
- Discovery Island Light
- Dryad Point Lighthouse
- Egg Island Lightstation
- Entrance Island Lightstation
- Estevan Point Lighthouse
- Fisgard Lighthouse, the oldest lighthouse on the West Coast of Canada.
- Gallows Point Light
- Green Island Lightstation
- Holland Rock Lightstation
- Ivory Island Lightstation
- Kains Island Lightstation
- Langara Light
- Lennard Island Lightstation
- Lucy Island Lighthouse
- Nootka Lighthouse
- Ogden Point Breakwater Lighthouse
- Pachena Point Lighthouse
- Pine Island Lightstation
- Point Atkinson Lighthouse
- Pointer Island Lightstation
- Race Rocks Lighthouse, the second oldest lighthouse on the West Coast of Canada.
- Roberts Bank Light
- Sands Head Light
- Scarlett Point Lighthouse
- Sheringham Point Lighthouse
- Sisters Island Lightstation
- Trial Islands Lighthouse
- Triple Island Lightstation
- Triangle Island Lightstation

== Newfoundland and Labrador ==
=== Labrador ===
This is a list of lighthouses in Labrador.

Name	Image	Year built	Location & coordinates	Class of Light	Focal height	NGA number	Admiralty number	Range nml
Belle Isle Northeast Light		1905	Belle Isle; 52°00′50″N 55°16′50″W	Fl W 10s.	137 metres (449 ft)	984	H0096	17
Belle Isle South End Lower Light	Image	1908	Belle Isle; 51°52′42″N 55°23′01″W	Fl W 20s.	50 metres (160 ft)	992	H0104	18
Belle Isle South End Upper Light	Image	1858	Belle Isle; 51°52′49″N 55°22′55″W	Fl W 20s.	137 metres (449 ft)	988	H0102	18
Camp Island Light		n/a	Division No. 10; 52°10′11″N 55°38′56″W	Fl W 5s.	42 metres (138 ft)	976	H0094	15
Castle Island Light		n/a	Division No. 10; 51°58′20″N 55°51′11″W	Fl W 6s.	20 metres (66 ft)	980	H0108	15
Double Island Light	Image	1905	Battle Harbour; 52°15′20″N 55°33′14″W	Fl W 6s.	38 metres (125 ft)	968	H0092	7
Kenamu River Range Front Light		n/a	Hamilton Inlet; 53°28′48″N 59°53′51″W	Oc G 6s.	7 metres (23 ft)	904	H0077	13
Kenamu River Range Rear Light		n/a	Hamilton Inlet; 53°28′29″N 59°55′02″W	Oc G 6s.	7 metres (23 ft)	900	H0076.5	13
Point Amour Lighthouse		1858	Division No. 10; 51°27′38″N 56°51′30″W	Oc W 20s.	46 metres (151 ft)	1012	H0114	24
Red Bay Light	Image	1906 est.	Saddle Island; 51°43′29″N 56°26′10″W	Fl W 5s.	36 metres (118 ft)	1000	H0110	15
St Modeste Island Light	Image	1956	West St. Modeste; 51°35′42″N 56°42′03″W	inactive since 2010	5.5 metres (18 ft) tower height	1004	H0111	
Terrington Narrows Light		n/a	Happy Valley-Goose Bay; 53°20′38″N 60°24′06″W	Dir WRG	10 metres (33 ft)	910	H0076.3	19

=== Newfoundland Atlantic Coast ===
This is a list of lighthouses on Newfoundland's Atlantic Coast.

Name	Image	Year built	Location & coordinates	Class of Light	Focal height	NGA number	Admiralty number	Range nml
Bacalhao Island Light	Image	1894	Bacalhao Island; 49°41′13″N 54°33′24″W	Fl W 10s.	106 metres (348 ft)	1300	H0636	17
Bacalhao Island Sector Light	Image	2006	Bacalhao Island; 49°41′13″N 54°33′24″W	Dir WRG	71 metres (233 ft)	1302	H0635	23
Baccalieu Island North Point Light	Image	1859	Baccalieu Island; 48°09′00″N 52°47′54″W	Fl W 6s.	176 metres (577 ft)	1736	H0498	7
Baccalieu Island Southwest Point Light	Image	1953	Baccalieu Island; 48°06′26″N 52°48′39″W	Fl W 10s.	53 metres (174 ft)	1740	H0500	16
Bay Bulls Light		1908	Bay Bulls; 47°18′39″N 52°44′49″W	Fl W 6s.	62.5 metres (205 ft)	1872	H0452	7
Bell Island Light		1966	Bell Island; 47°39′18″N 52°54′59″W	Fl W 6s.	53 metres (174 ft)	1836	H0470	17
Brigus Light	Image	1885	Brigus; 47°32′54″N 53°10′56″W	Fl W 3s.	34 metres (112 ft)	1788	H0478	8
Cabot Islands Light	Image	1880	Bonavista Bay; 49°10′30″N 53°22′01″W	Fl W 10s.	23 metres (75 ft)	1496	H0576	17
Cape Bauld Light	Image	1962	Quirpon Island; 51°38′24″N 55°25′38″W	Fl W 15s.	54 metres (177 ft)	1052	H0132	17
Cape Bonavista Light		1843	Bonavista Peninsula; 48°42′05″N 53°05′07″W	Fl W 10s.	51 metres (167 ft)	1644	H0536	16
Cape Norman Light	Image	1964	Cape Norman; 51°37′42″N 55°54′21″W	Fl (3) W 30s.	35 metres (115 ft)	1032	H0140	21
Cape Race Lighthouse		1907	Avalon Peninsula; 46°39′31″N 53°04′26″W	Fl W 7.5s	52 metres (171 ft)	1904	H0444	24
Cape Spear Light		1955	Cape Spear; 47°31′12″N 52°37′25″W	Fl (3) W 15s.	71 metres (233 ft)	1868	H0454	20
Cape St. Francis Light	Image	1957	Cape St. Francis; 47°48′32″N 52°47′12″W	Fl W 5s.	29 metres (95 ft)	1844	H0468	15
Conche Light	Image	1992	Conche; 50°53′10″N 55°53′51″W	Fl R 6s.	6 metres (20 ft)	1096	H0722	4
Ferryland Head Light		1871	Ferryland; 47°01′01″N 52°51′27″W	Fl W 10s.	58 metres (190 ft)	1876	H0450	15
Fort Amherst Lighthouse		1951	St. John's; 47°33′49″N 52°40′50″W	Fl W 15s.	40 metres (130 ft)	1848	H0458	17
Fox Point Light	Image	2003	Fox Point; 51°21′22″N 55°33′18″W	Fl W 10s.	27 metres (89 ft)	1068	H0730	17
Green Island Light	Image	1857	Green Island (Catalina), Newfoundland; 48°30′15″N 53°02′36″W	Fl W 4s.	28 metres (92 ft)	1648	H0526	15
Green Point Light	Image	1883	Green Point; 47°36′41″N 53°10′36″W	L Fl W 10s.	17 metres (56 ft)	1784	H0482	6
Gull Island Lighthouse	Image	1884	Baie Verte Peninsula; 49°59′51″N 55°21′48″W	Fl W 10s.	160 metres (520 ft)	1172	H0686	17
Hant's Harbour Light	Image	1957	Hant's Harbour; 48°01′19″N 53°15′16″W	Iso W 6s.	20 metres (66 ft)	1728	H0504	13
Heart's Content Light		1901	Heart's Content; 47°52′56″N 53°23′07″W	Oc W 6s.	25 metres (82 ft)	1716	H0510	8
King's Cove Head Light		1893	King's Cove; 48°34′33″N 53°19′21″W	Fl W 4s.	54 metres (177 ft)	1620	H0540	5
Little Denier Island Lighthouse	Image	1888	Bonavista Bay; 48°41′09″N 53°35′23″W	Fl W 3s.	91 metres (299 ft)	1608	H0543	7
Long Island East End Light	Image	2009	Lushes Bight–Beaumont–Beaumont North; 49°35′51″N 55°34′50″W	Fl W 6s.	31 metres (102 ft)	1212	H0675	7
Long Point Lighthouse		1876	Twillingate; 49°41′16″N 54°48′00″W	Fl W 5s.	101 metres (331 ft)	1272	H0640	16
Offer Wadham Lighthouse	Image	1990s	Wadham Islands; 49°35′37″N 53°45′47″W	Fl W 3s.	30 metres (98 ft)	1440	H0584	6
Peckford Island Lighthouse	Image	1961	Wadham Islands; 49°31′50″N 53°51′05″W	Fl W 10s.	16 metres (52 ft)	1440	H0586	17
Puffin Island Light	Image	1956	Greenspond; 49°03′42″N 53°33′04″W	Fl W 5s.	21 metres (69 ft)	1556	H0556	16
Random Head Harbour Light	Image	1895	Random Island; 48°05′41″N 53°32′43″W	Fl W 3s.	38 metres (125 ft)	1704	H0514	7
Surgeon Cove Point Light	Image	1911	Notre Dame Bay; 49°31′08″N 55°07′02″W	Fl W 5s.	74 metres (243 ft)	1240	H0656	16
Westport Cove Light	Image	1906	Westport; 49°47′11″N 56°38′45″W	Fl W 4s.	10 metres (33 ft)	1140	H0704	7

=== Newfoundland South Coast ===
This is a list of lighthouses in Newfoundland South Coast.

Name	Image	Year built	Location & coordinates	Class of Light	Focal height	NGA number	Admiralty number	Range nml
Boar Island Light	Image	1874 est.	Burgeo; 47°36′24″N 57°35′12″W	Fl W 5s.	63 metres (207 ft)	2394	H0260	15
Cape Pine Light		1851	Cape Pine; 46°37′02″N 53°31′54″W	Fl W 5s.	96 metres (315 ft)	1920	H0440	16
Cape Ray Light		1959	Cape Ray; 47°37′16″N 59°18′14″W	Fl W 15s.	36 metres (118 ft)	2492	H0220	17
Cape St. Mary's Light		1860	Cape St. Mary's; 46°49′23″N 54°11′46″W	Fl W 5s.	119 metres (390 ft)	1952	H0432	21
Channel Head Light		1895	Channel-Port aux Basques; 47°33′57″N 59°07′25″W	Fl W 10s.	29 metres (95 ft)	2468	H0222	17
Colombier Islands Light	Image	1971 est.	Burnt Islands; 47°35′31″N 58°53′51″W	Fl W 5s.	18 metres (59 ft)	2436	H0238	15
Dawson Point Light	Image	1916 est.	Pushthrough; 47°38′37″N 47°38′37″W	Fl W 5s.	17 metres (56 ft)	2352	H0276	16
Garnish Light	Image	1885 est.	Garnish; 47°14′11″N 55°21′30″W	Q R	8 metres (26 ft)	2264	H0318	6
Grand Bank East Pier Light	Image	1922	Grand Bank; 47°06′05″N 55°44′58″W	Q G	8 metres (26 ft)	2248	H0322	5
Green Island Light	Image	1993	46°52′48″N 56°05′08″W	Fl W 10s.	45 metres (148 ft)	2156	H0348	15
Little Burin Island Light	Image	1915 est.	Placentia Bay; 46°58′50″N 55°11′27″W	Fl W 10s.	26 metres (85 ft)	2120	H0364	17
Long Island South Point Light	Image	2004	47°17′53″N 54°42′16″W	Fl W 5s.	72 metres (236 ft)	2068	H0380	5
Northwest Head Light	Image	1902	Ramea; 47°30′45″N 57°24′31″W	Fl W 3s.	38 metres (125 ft)	2380	H0264	13
Point Verde Light	Image	1990	Point Verde; 47°14′15″N 54°00′55″W	Fl W 5s.	30 metres (98 ft)	1960	H0422	13
Powles Head Light	Image	1960	Trepassey; 46°41′25″N 53°24′06″W	Fl W 10s.	31 metres (102 ft)	1908	H0442	22
Rose Blanche Light		1996	Rose Blanche-Harbour le Cou; 47°36′06″N 58°41′41″W	Fl R 10s.	29 metres (95 ft)	2418	H0242.5	13
St. Jacques Island Light	Image	1908	St. Jacques-Coomb's Cove; 47°28′25″N 55°24′22″W	Fl W 6s.	40 metres (130 ft)	2292	H0304	16

=== Newfoundland West Coast ===
This is a list of lighthouses in Newfoundland West Coast.

Name	Image	Year built	Location & coordinates	Class of Light	Focal height	NGA number	Admiralty number	Range nml
Broad Cove Point Range Front Light	Image	1955	Stephenville, Newfoundland and Labrador; 48°41′19″N 58°41′04″W	inactive since 2005	9 metres (30 ft) (tower)	ex-2584	ex- H0199	---
Broad Cove Point Range Rear Light	Image	1955	Stephenville, Newfoundland and Labrador; 48°41′10″N 58°40′53″W	inactive since 2005	15 metres (49 ft) (tower)	ex-2588	ex-H0199.1	---
Cape Anguille Lighthouse		1960	Cape Anguille; 47°54′03″N 59°24′40″W	Fl W 5s.	25 metres (82 ft)	2504	H0218	15
Cow Head Light		1905	Cow Head; 49°55′12″N 57°49′32″W	inactive since 1988	5 metres (16 ft) (tower)	ARLHS; CAN-680	---	---
Flowers Cove Light	Image	1899	Flowers Cove; 51°18′30″N 56°44′55″W	Fl G 3s.	5 metres (16 ft)	2724	H0144	4
Harbour Point Light	Image	1883	Harbour Point; 48°27′26″N 58°29′19″W	Fl W 6s.	11 metres (36 ft)	2516	H0208	5
Keppel Island Light	Image	1992	Port Saunders; 50°37′59″N 57°19′20″W	Fl W 15s.	36 metres (118 ft)	2668	H0156	17
Lobster Cove Head Light		1897	Lobster Cove; 49°36′10″N 57°57′21″W	Iso W 4s.	35 metres (115 ft)	2640	H0164	12
New Férolle Peninsula Light	Image	1913	Reefs Harbour-Shoal Cove West-New Ferolle; 51°01′21″N 57°05′44″W	Q (4) W 7.5s.	28 metres (92 ft)	2704	H0149	20
Point Riche Lighthouse		1892	Port au Choix; 50°41′54″N 57°24′38″W	Fl W 5s.	29 metres (95 ft)	2680	H0154	15
South Head Light	Image	2010	Lark Harbour; 49°08′48″N 58°22′13″W	Fl W 4s.	35 metres (115 ft)	2604	H0192	6
Woody Point Light		1959	Woody Point; 49°30′17″N 57°54′45″W	Fl R 4s.	14 metres (46 ft)	2644	H0168	4

== New Brunswick ==
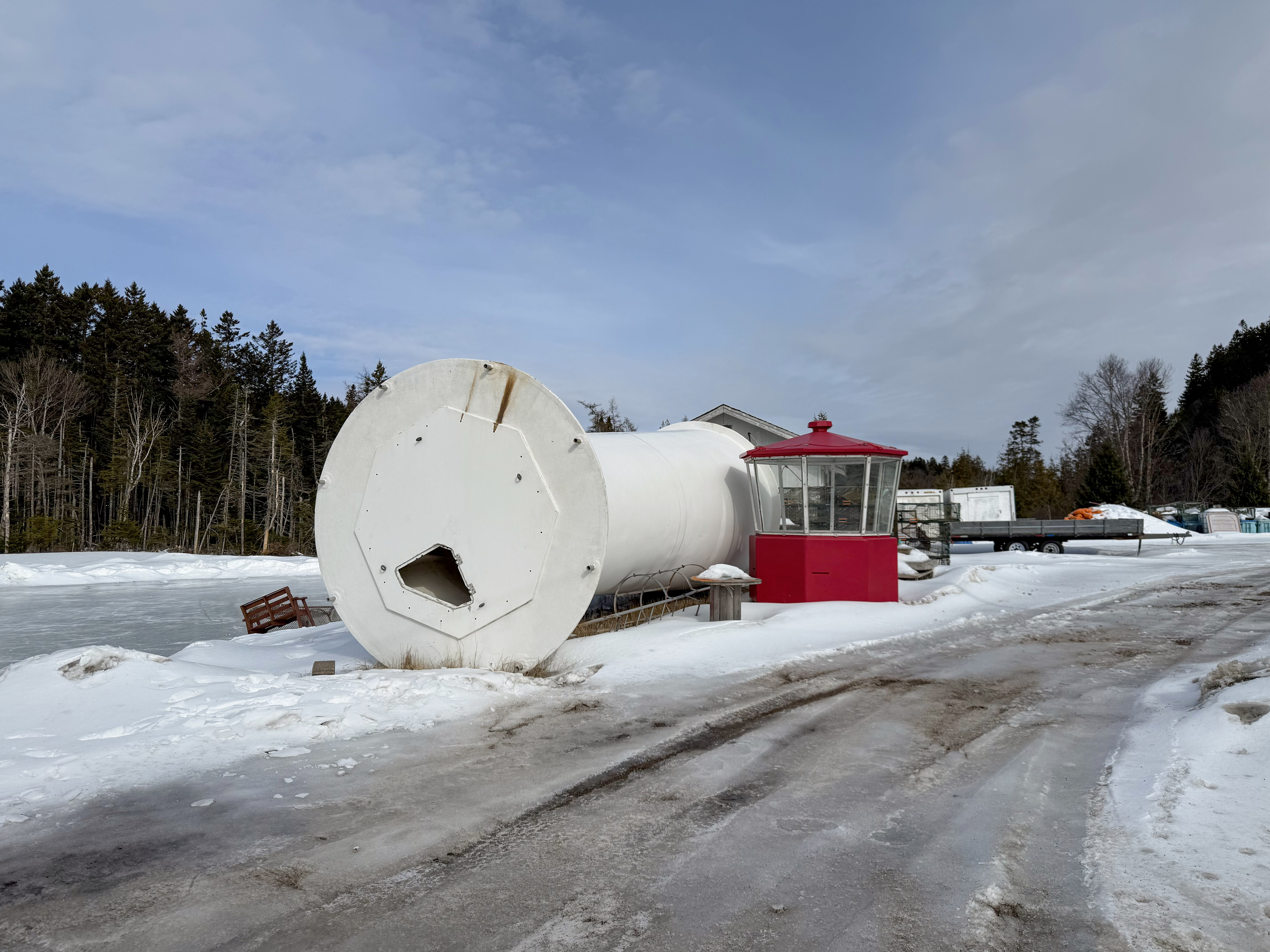
Many older New Brunswick fiberglass lighthouse towers have been replaced by simple masts with solar LED beacons to reduce maintenance.

- Anderson Hollow
- Bayswater
- Belyea's Point
- Cape Enrage
- Cape Spencer Light
- Cocagne
- Dixon Point
- Gannet Rock
- Grand Harbour Lighthouse
- Green's Point
- Head Harbour (a.k.a. East Quoddy Head Light)
- Inch Arran
- Jerome Point
- Lighthouse on the Green
- Long Eddy Point
- Machias Seal Island
- Miscou Island Lighthouse
- Mulholland Point
- Oak Point
- Old Portage Island
- Point-du-Chene
- Pointe-Sapin
- Quaco Head
- Richiboucto Head
- Southwest Head
- Swallowtail Lighthouse

== Nova Scotia ==
- Balache Point Lighthouse
- Bass River, lighthouse, in use from 1908 to the 1980s
- Devils Island Light
- Cape Forchu Lighthouse
- Cape George Point Lighthouse, located in Antigonish County
- Cape North Lighthouse, in use from 1908 to 1980
- Cape Sable Lighthouse, located on Cape Sable Island
- Caribou Island Lighthouse (Nova Scotia), located in Pictou County
- Five Islands, lighthouse, in use from 1914 to 1993
- Fort Point Lighthouse
- Georges Island Lighthouse
- Grandique Point Lighthouse
- Hampton Beach Lighthouse, located overlooking Chute's Cove, Hampton Beach. Established 1911.
- Jerome Point Lighthouse, located in St. Peter's, Cape Breton. Established in 1882
- Kidston Island Lighthouse, located in Baddeck, Cape Breton
- Louisbourg Light, built on the site of the oldest lighthouse on the continent, and the first Canadian one
- Low Point Lighthouse
- Neil's Harbour Lighthouse
- Peggys Point Lighthouse
- Peter Island lighthouse
- Point Prim Lighthouse, located at the entrance of the Digby Gut
- Sambro Island Lighthouse, the oldest continuously operating lighthouse in North America
- Sable Island East End Light
- Sable Island West End Light
- The Salvages Light Tower
- Schafner Point Lighthouse
- Seal Island Lighthouse
- St. Paul Island Lighthouses North point and South point

== Ontario ==
The no longer operating Old Cut Lighthouse, located on Long Point.

- Beausoleil Island Light
- Big Tub Light, Tobermory, Ontario
- Brebeuf Island Light
- Burlington Canal Front Range Light
- Burlington Canal Rear Range Light
- Byng Inlet Range Lights
- Cabot Head Light
- Cape Croker Lighthouse
- Caribou Island Lighthouse
- Chantry Island Lightstation Tower Lightstation, Chantry Island, Ontario
- Christian Island Light
- Coppermine Point
- Cove Island Light
- Erieau East Pier Light
- Fleet Street Lighthouse in Toronto, a.k.a. Queen's Wharf
- Gibraltar Point Lighthouse on the Toronto Islands
- Ile Parisienne Light, Whitefish Bay, Lake Superior
- Imperial Towers Six stone lighthouses built circa 1858–59, on Lake Huron and Georgian Bay
- Kincardine Lighthouse, Kincardine, Ontario
- Long Point Lighthouse, Long Point, Ontario (built in 1917, is the third Long Point Light, replaced the 1843 light, which in turn replaced the 1830 light)
- Mohawk Island Light, on Mohawk Island, Ontario (formerly called Gull Island)
- Nottawasaga Island Lighthouse Nottawasaga Island, Collingwood, Ontario
- Nine Mile Point on Simcoe Island
- Old Cut Lighthouse on Long Point (inactive)
- Snug Harbour, Parry Sound, Killbear Provincial Park
- Point Clark Lighthouse, Point Clark, Ontario
- Prescott Breakwater Light in Prescott, Ontario
- Prince Edward Point in Prince Edward County, Ontario
- Queen's Wharf, see Fleet Street Lighthouse
- Thames River Light
- Toronto Harbour Light at Tommy Thompson Park in Toronto
- Windmill Point Light (best known because of the Battle of the Windmill)
- Port Burwell Lighthouse, Port Burwell- Canada's oldest wooden lighthouse
- Presqu'ile Lighthouse

== Quebec ==
- Pointe-Mitis Lighthouse, Métis-sur-mer, built in 1909
- Cap de la tête au chien Lighthouse, Saint-Siméon
- Cap-au-Saumon Lighthouse, Port-au-Persil, built in 1894
- Haut-fond Prince Lighthouse, offshore Tadoussac, built in 1964
- Pointe-au-Père lighthouse, in use from 1908 to 1975
- Cap-des-Rosiers, the tallest lighthouse in Canada: 34.1 M
- Île-Verte Lighthouse, built in 1809, third oldest in Canada
- Brandy Pot Lighthouse, Rivière-du-Loup, built in 1862
- Bicquette Island Lighthouse, Le Bic, built in 1843
- Matane Lighthouse, Matane
- Cap Chat Lighthouse, Cap Chat, built in 1871
- La Martre Lighthouse, La Martre, built in 1906
- Cap Madeleine Lighthouse, Gaspé Peninsula
- Fame Point Lighthouse, Gaspé, built in 1880
- Cap Gaspé Lighthouse, Forillon National Park
- Cap Blanc Lighthouse, Percé
- Cap-d'Espoir, Chaleur Bay
- Étang-du-Nord Lighthouse, built in 1874, rebuilt in 1987, Cap-aux-Meules
- Amherst Island Lighthouse, built in 1960, Amherst Island
- Brion Island Lighthouse, Brion Island, built in 1905
- Lachine Light Tower, Lachine, built in 1900
- L'ile du Moine Lighthouse, Sorel
- Rocher-aux-Oiseaux Lighthouse, Magdalen Islands, built in 1870
- Ile Sainte-Hélène Light, Montréal, Quebec, built in 1912
- Soulanges Canal Lower Entrance Front Range Light, Pointe-des-Cascades, built in 1902, inactive since 1960
- Courbe Maskinongé Lighthouse, Offshore Lac Saint-Pierre
- Pilier de pierre Lighthouse, Saint-Jean-Port-Joli built in 1843
- Pointe de la Prairie Lighthouse, Isle-aux-Coudres, built in 1971
- Port Daniel Ouest Lighthouse, Port-Daniel–Gascons, built in 1919

== See also ==
- History of lighthouses in Canada
- List of lighthouses and lightvessels
- Lightvessel
- Lighthouses in the United States
