= Fox Point =

Fox Point may refer to:

- Fox Point, Newfoundland and Labrador, a settlement in Newfoundland, Canada
- Fox Point, Providence, Rhode Island, a neighborhood in Providence, Rhode Island
- Fox Point, Wisconsin, a village in, Wisconsin, USA
