= Bacalao =

Bacalao (Spanish for cod) may refer to:

- Bacalao (cuisine), dried and salted cod
  - Bacalhau, dried and salted cod in Portuguese cuisine
- Bacalao (phantom island), a phantom island depicted on several early 16th century Portuguese maps
- Baccalieu Island, an island by Conception Bay in Newfoundland
- Bacalhao Island, an island off Twillingate in Newfoundland
- Bacalao (album), a 1960 album by Eddie "Lockjaw" Davis and Shirley Scott
- Bacalhau (film), a 1976 Brazilian comedy film that parodies Jaws
- Juana Bacallao, Cuban singer
- Bacalao or bakalao, see also article in Spanish bakalao - local sub-genre of the dance electronic music formed in Spain (Valencia) in 1980-1990s.
