= Devils Island Light (Nova Scotia) =

Devils Island East Light
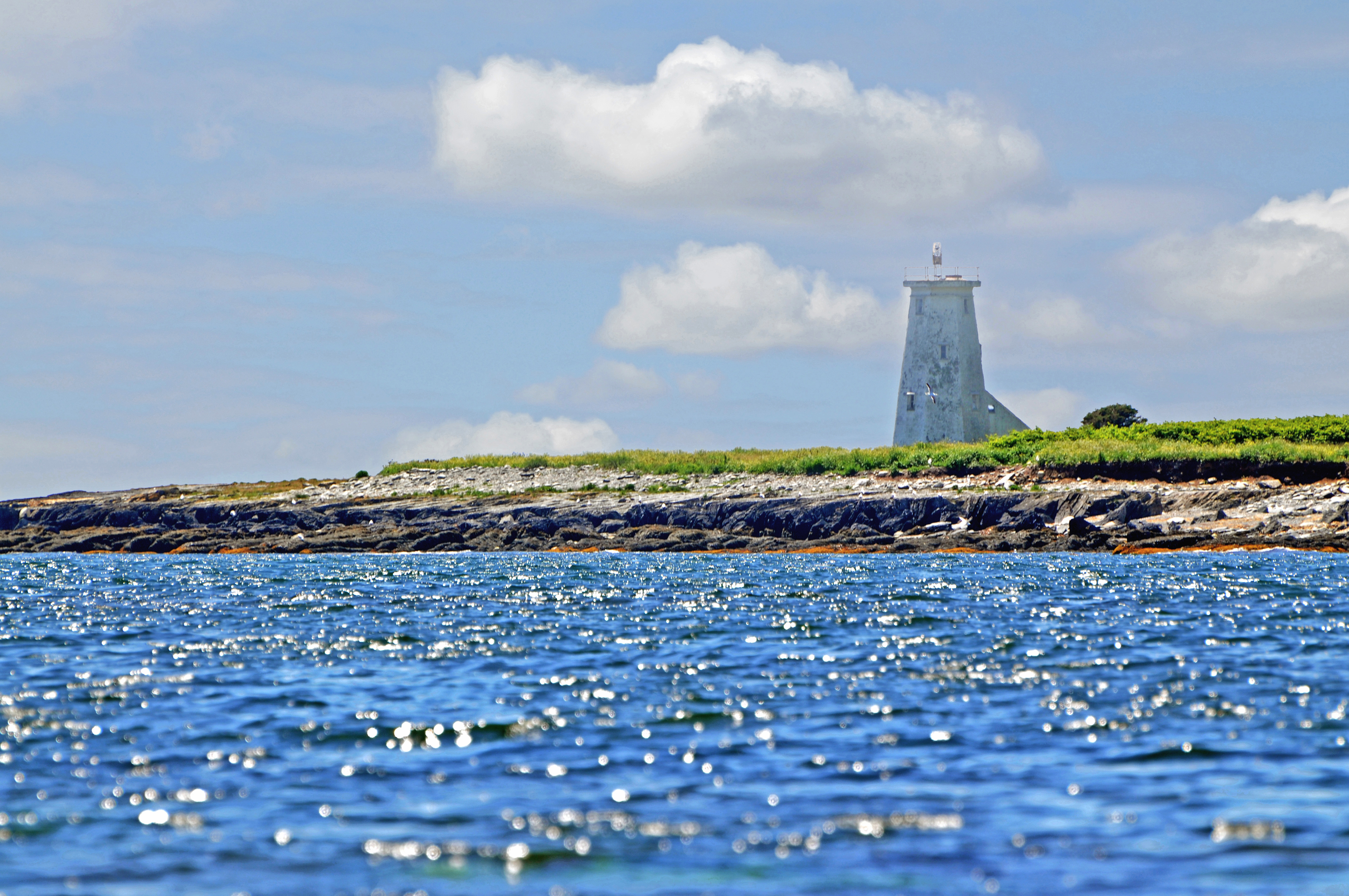
- Devils Island in 2010
- Location: Devils Island; Nova Scotia; Canada
- Coordinates: 44°34′51.4″N 63°27′30.5″W

Tower
- Construction: wooden tower
- Automated: 1978
- Height: 39 feet (12 m)
- Shape: octagonal tower with balcony, lantern removed in 1978
- Markings: white tower
- Operator: Canadian Coast Guard

Light
- First lit: 1852
- Focal height: 52 feet (16 m)
- Range: 13 nautical miles (24 km; 15 mi)
- Characteristic: Fl W 10s.

The Devils Island Light is a Nova Scotia lighthouse located at the eastern shore entrance to Halifax Harbour on Devils Island, Nova Scotia. First lit in 1852, it was succeeded by a second lighthouse in 1877 which survives today. The lighthouse has influenced regional folklore and remains an important community landmark although it is currently neglected and threatened.

== History ==
In 1711, a map of Halifax harbour was designed by a French engineer De Labat and featured a thirty-seven acre island named "Isle Verte" or Green Island after all the trees. Rear Admiral Pullen records that on James Cook's charts in 1759 the island is called Devils Island, but on Thomas Backhouse's chart of "The Harbour of Halifax," 1798, it is called Devils or Rous's Island. According to H. W. Hewitt, a schoolteacher and author of numerous articles on the history of Eastern Passage, a group of Halifax sportsmen went to the island for a night and ended up staying a few days longer than planned after an episode of bad weather. After returning to dry land, when asked where they had been, they all replied that they "did not know unless it was the Devil's Island". But this is just one of the stories that accounts for the origin of the name; like many islands, its name has undergone a few changes through history.

Devils Island, situated in the Atlantic Ocean – amid shoals and other hazards for seafarers, was the cause of numerous shipwrecks. The residents often used their own fishing boats and risked their lives in attempts to rescue the crews of wrecked ships. In 1837, a wooden beacon painted white was erected on the southern point of the island as a navigational aid, but because it was only visible during the day time, in 1851 a Halifax group made up of merchants, traders, and sea mariners presented a petition to the lieutenant-governor for a lighthouse to be built which the Assembly approved. In 1852, an octagonal lighthouse with an accompanying mirrored light was constructed near the shore on the southwest corner of the island. In 1877, a second lighthouse was built 175 yards east of the first one. The western light "was open all round, while the eastern one was dark on its northern side" (Boileau, Historic Eastern Passage, 103). Both white lights were visible from a distance of thirteen miles. In 1949, the first lighthouse erected was demolished and the light in the second was changed to flashing red and was visible for thirteen miles. In 1959, it was changed to a flashing white and amber light and was visible for eleven miles. In 1967, an automatic beacon flashing white was installed making the lighthouse keeper unnecessary, and all permanent human habitation on the island ceased after this event. The remaining standing buildings, like the lighthouse keeper's house, have been exposed to yearly seasonal weather without any maintenance and show signs of disrepair. While under the care of the Canadian Coast Guard, the cupola of the second lighthouse was dismantled and discarded on the beach.

== Cultural significance ==
Devils Island and its lighthouse have artistic and a cultural significance as the source of stories and songs of the sea. In 1928 Helen Creighton first heard folk stories with the motif of a sunken crew taking over a ship from the singing of Gordon Young on Devils Island : "A dozen dripping sailors...faces pale and wan moved before us till...the lighthouse shone its light" (Creighton, Bluenose Ghosts, 117).

Families in nearby Eastern Passage have a attachment which is felt by the many descendants of the families who were once residents of Devils Island and who now live in Eastern Passage and share a living connection to the history of this island as well as a view plane of this structure against sky and sea.

== Devils Island Light Society ==
In 2009, a group of private citizens formed the Devils Island Light Society to express concern for the present condition and also the future of the lighthouse. It was the intention of the society to apply to have the Devils Island lighthouse included under Bill S-215 (the Heritage Lighthouse Protection Act) when the Bill came into force in May 2010. The Canadian Heritage Act designates and preserves historically significant lighthouses. It also requires that communities near the lights be consulted before changing, selling, transferring or demolishing any of the designated stations. The society fought an uphill battle against Coast Guard censure and warning that members were not allowed to approach the lighthouse to restore and paint the facade. Nevertheless, the society mounted a rigorous campaign to publicize the historical and cultural significance of this seafaring landmark and organized a petition to demonstrate public support for its mission to save the lighthouse and maintain it on the Island, in situ. Approximately 8,000 signatures were collected and presented to the federal committee having oversight of Canadian lighthouses.

== See also ==
- List of lighthouses in Canada
