= Lobster Cove, Newfoundland and Labrador =

Lobster Cove Lighthouse
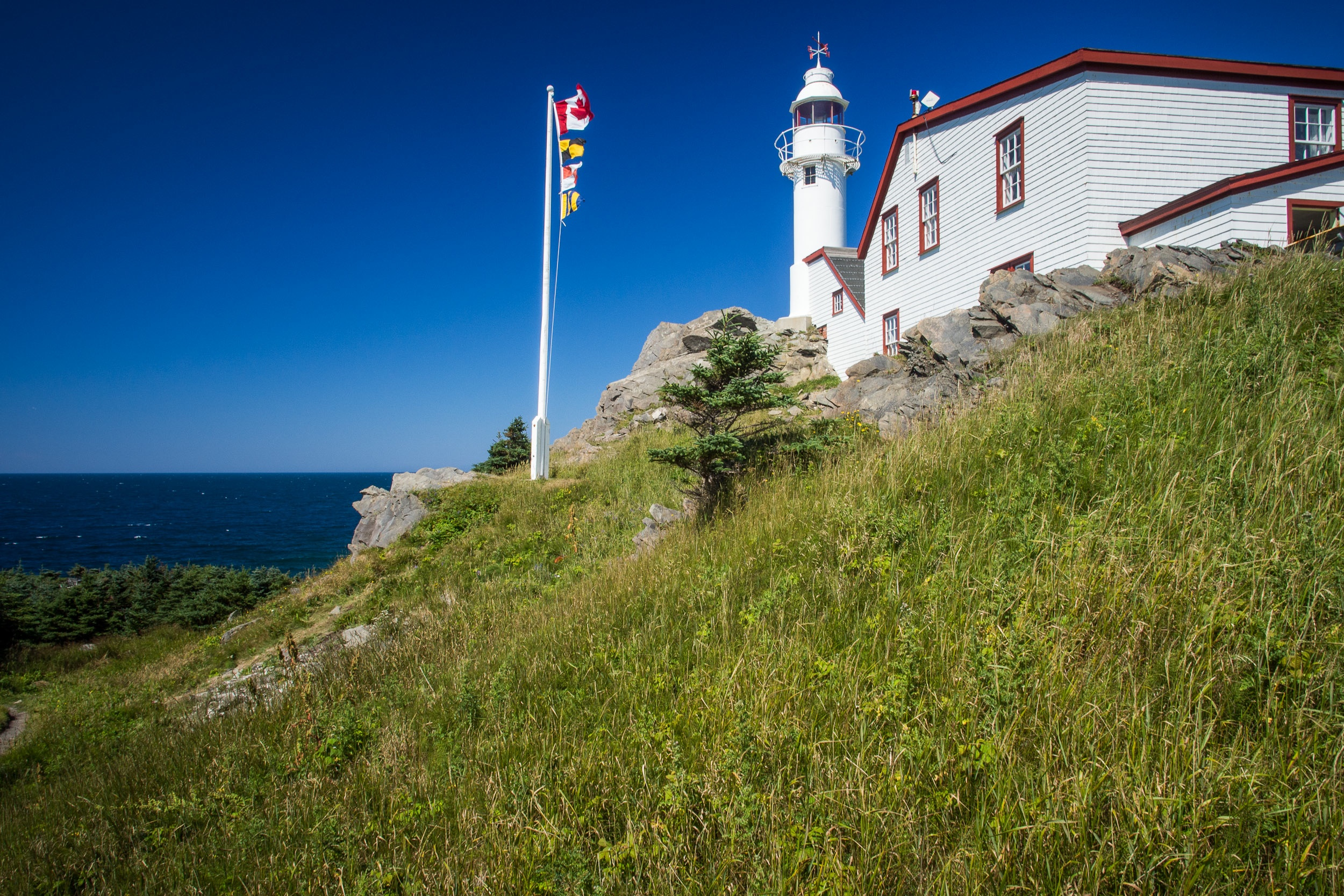
- Lobster Cove Lighthouse in 2012
- Location: Lobster Cove Head; Newfoundland; Canada
- Coordinates: 49°36′10.37″N 57°57′21.16″W

Tower
- Constructed: 1897
- Foundation: concrete base
- Construction: cast iron tower
- Automated: 1969
- Height: 8 metres (26 ft)
- Shape: cylindrical tower with balcony and lantern
- Markings: white tower and lantern
- Operator: Parks Canada
- Heritage: recognized federal heritage building of Canada

Light
- Focal height: 35 metres (115 ft)
- Lens: fifth-order dioptric lens
- Range: 12 nautical miles (22 km; 14 mi)
- Characteristic: Iso W 4s.

Lobster Cove is a fishing village near Rocky Harbour, Newfoundland.

== See also ==
- List of lighthouses in Canada
- List of communities in Newfoundland and Labrador
