= Green Island (Catalina), Newfoundland and Labrador =

Green Island Lighthouse
- Location: Green Island (Catalina), Bonavista Peninsula, Newfoundland and Labrador, Canada
- Coordinates: 48°30′15″N 53°02′36″W

Tower
- Constructed: 1857
- Foundation: concrete base
- Construction: stone encased in concrete tower
- Height: 9 m (30 ft)
- Shape: octagonal prism tower with balcony and lantern
- Markings: white tower, white and red lantern dome
- Operator: Canadian Coast Guard

Light
- Focal height: 28 m (92 ft)
- Range: 15 nmi (28 km; 17 mi)
- Characteristic: Fl W 4s

Location of Green Island in Newfoundland

Green Island is located in eastern Newfoundland off the east coast of the Bonavista Peninsula near the entrance to Catalina Harbour. The nearest town is Port Union.

== Lighthouse ==
A lighthouse on Green Island was established in 1857, and a foghorn was added in 1883. The lighthouse keepers were the entire population of the island which was reported for most of the 19th century and up until that of 1935.

== See also ==
- List of lighthouses in Canada
