= Devils Island (Nova Scotia) =

- Island community
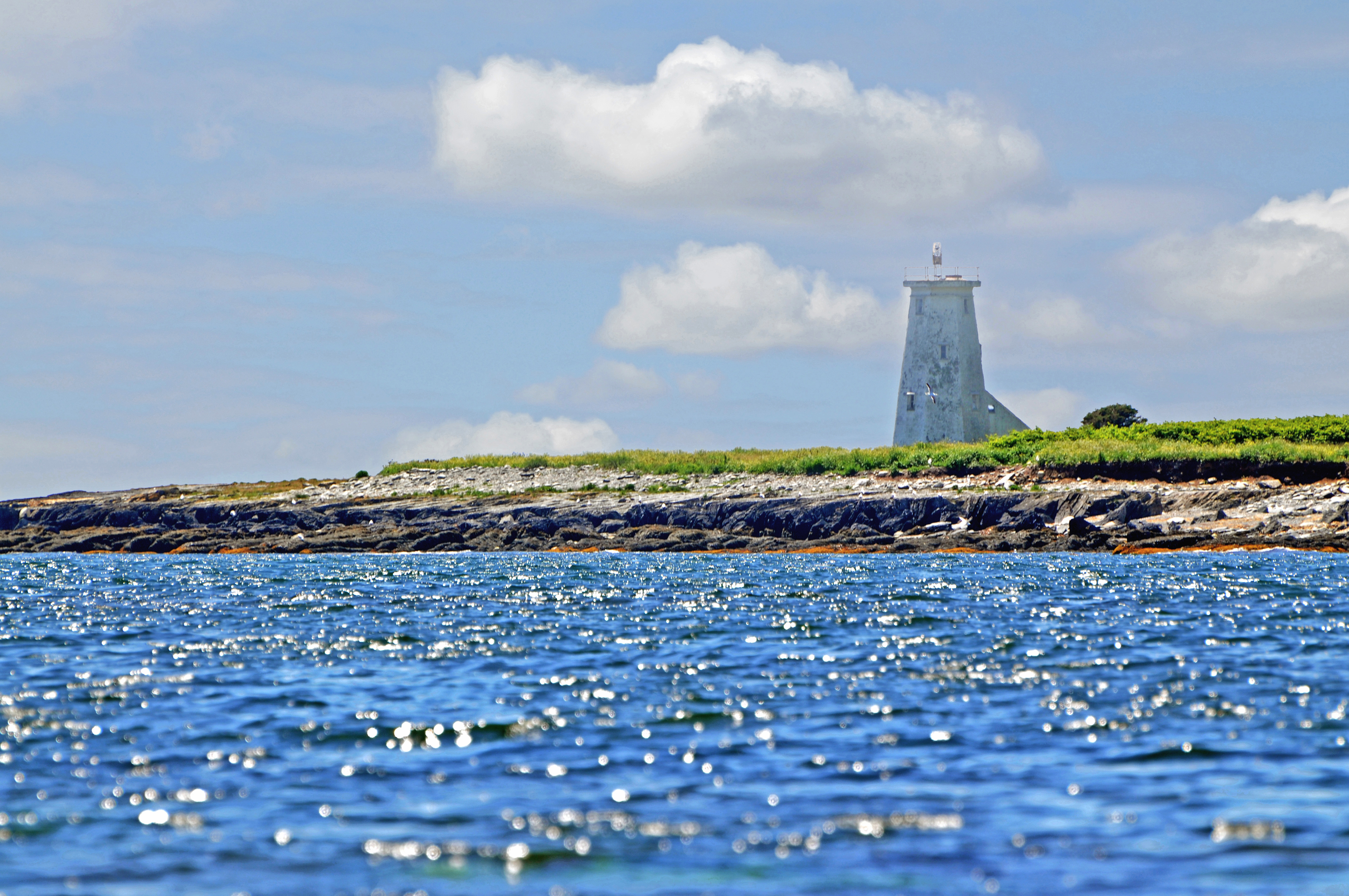
- Lighthouse on Devils Island

- Location of Devils Island, Nova Scotia
- Coordinates: 44°35′0″N 63°27′32.59″W
- Country: Canada
- Province: Nova Scotia
- Municipality: Halifax Regional Municipality
- District: 9
- Founded: 1711

Area (Island)
  - Total: .12 km^{2} (0.046 sq mi)
- Elevation: 4.6 m (15 ft)
- Time zone: UTC-4 (AST)
  - Summer (DST): UTC-3 (ADT)
- GNBC Code: CAJKW
- Website: http://www.devilsisland.ca/

Devils Island, Nova Scotia is located on the northeast entrance of Halifax Harbour off the coast of the community of Eastern Passage, part of the Halifax Regional Municipality. The name originated from an early French merchant named Deval or Devol.

== History ==
The first permanent settlement on this 12-hectare (30-acre) island was established in 1830, and by 1850 there were three houses and a school. By 1901 the settlement had grown to 18 houses. A number of Devil's Island residents, notably Ben Henneberry, provided valuable folklore to pioneering Canadian folklorist Helen Creighton. Most of the residents were moved to the mainland during World War II. The last permanent resident, a Norwegian artist, moved off in 2000.

The island is currently owned by Halifax entrepreneur Bill Mont. The Devil's Island Lighthouse, built in 1877, replacing an earlier tower built in 1852, is still standing but is not functional and is threatened. The island was also the base for a rescue lifeboat until the 1950s which saved the crews of many vessels stranded on the shoals approaching Halifax Harbour.
