= Cap-des-Rosiers Lighthouse =

Lighthouse in Quebec, Canada

Cap-des-Rosiers Lighthouse Phare de Cap-des-Rosiers
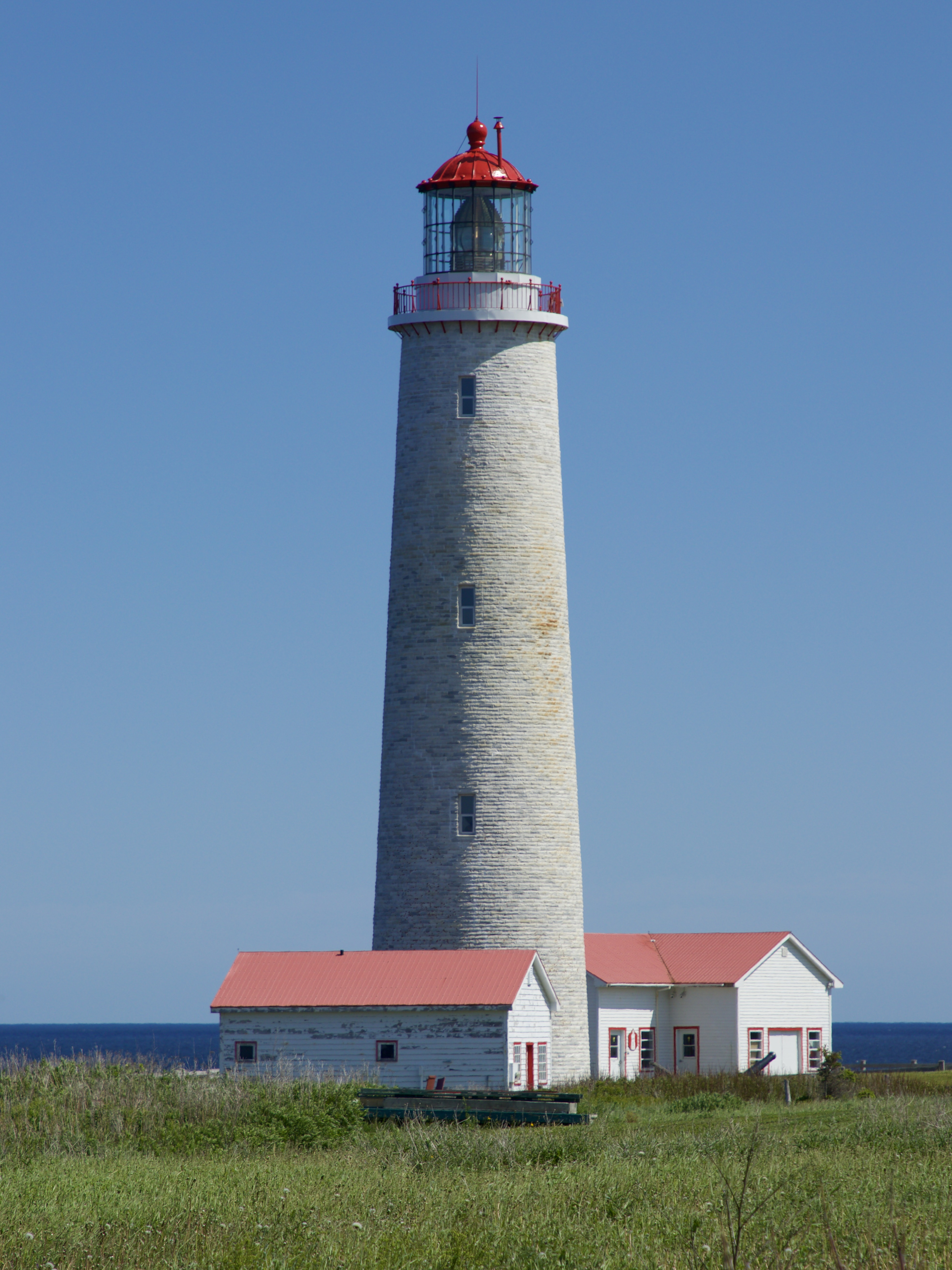
- Cap-des-Rosiers Lighthouse in 2025
- Location: Gaspé; Quebec; Canada
- Coordinates: 48°51′22.5″N 64°12′03.8″W

Tower
- Constructed: 1858
- Foundation: stone, up to 8' deep
- Construction: limestone tower, faced with white marble
- Automated: 1981
- Height: 34.1 metres (112 ft)
- Shape: cylindrical tower with balcony and lantern
- Markings: white tower, red lantern and trim
- Heritage: national Historic Sites of Canada, classified federal heritage building of Canada

Light
- Focal height: 41.5 metres (136 ft)
- Lens: first-order fresnel lens
- Range: 24 nautical miles (44 km; 28 mi)
- Characteristic: Oc W Flash 15 s; eclipse 5 s. Year round

National Historic Site of Canada
- Official name: Cap-des-Rosiers Lighthouse National Historic Site of Canada
- Designated: May 18, 1974
- Reference no.: 75521

National Historic Site of Canada
- Official name: Lighttower, Highway 132, Gaspé, Quebec, Canada
- Type: Classified Federal Heritage Building
- Designated: March 31, 1994
- Reference no.: 4383

The Cap-des-Rosiers Lighthouse (French: Phare de Cap-des-Rosiers) is a lighthouse near the village of Cap-des-Rosiers in Gaspé, Quebec, Canada.

It was classified as a National Historic Site of Canada on June 11, 1973 and was listed as a Federal Heritage Building on March 31, 1994.

The Cap-des-Rosiers Lighthouse is the tallest lighthouse in Canada, standing 34.1 metres (112 ft) tall. It is situated on the south shore of the Saint Lawrence River at the top of a steep cliff. It is located at the mouth of the river, where it flows into the Gulf of St. Lawrence. The lighthouse open for tours in the summer season.

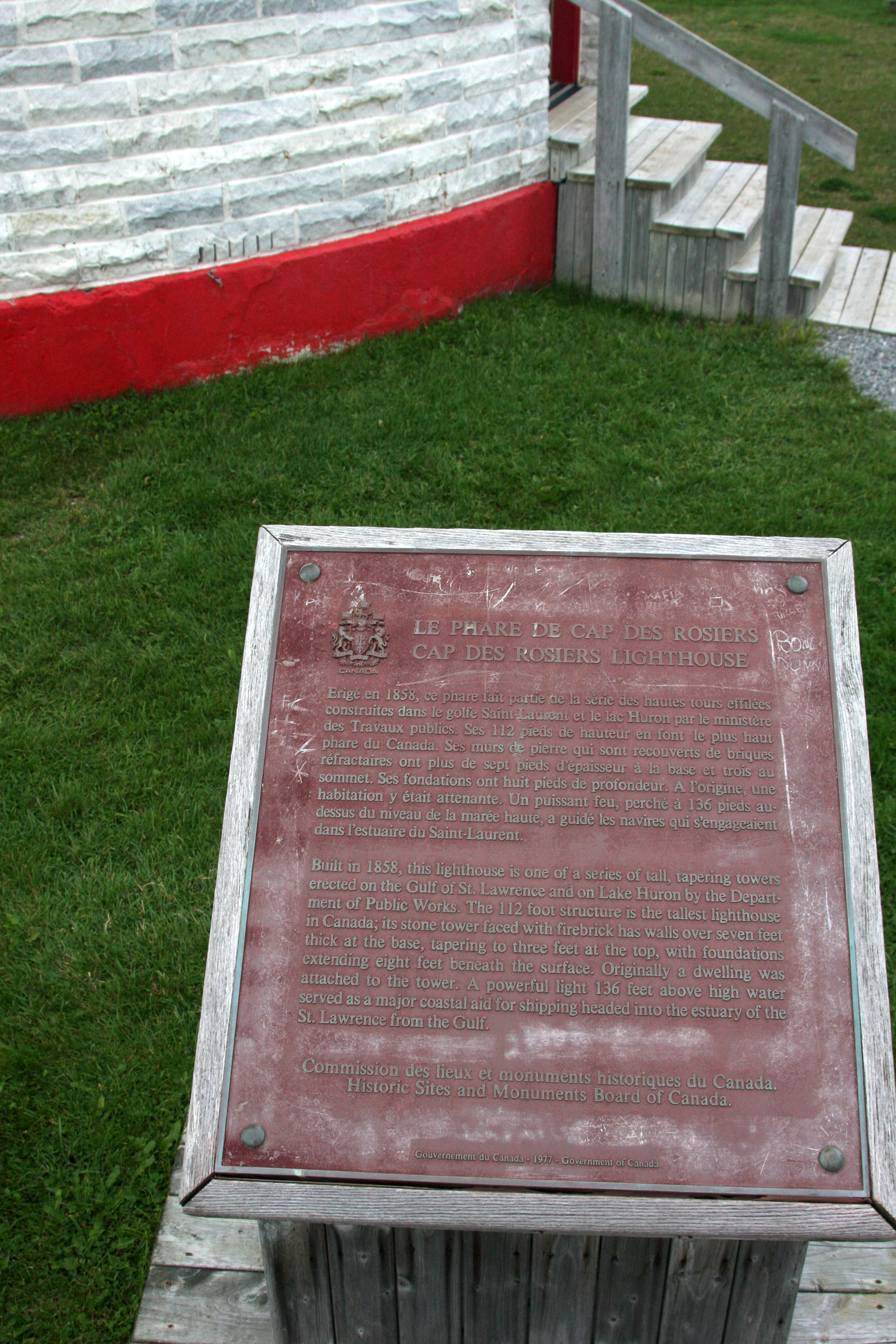
Cap-des-Rosiers Lighthouse Historic Plaque

== Historic Sites and Monuments Board of Canada ==
The Historic Sites and Monuments Board of Canada installed a plaque at the base of the lighthouse in 1977, with inscriptions in French and English, which reads (in English):

Built in 1858, this lighthouse is one of a series of tall, tapering towers erected on the Gulf of St. Lawrence and on Lake Huron by the Department of Public Works. The 112 foot structure is the tallest lighthouse in Canada; its stone tower faced with firebrick has walls over seven feet thick at the base, tapering to three feet at the top, with foundations extending to eight feet beneath the surface. Originally a dwelling was attached to the tower. A powerful light 136 feet above high water served as a major coastal aid for shipping headed in the estuary of the St. Lawrence from the Gulf.

== Keepers ==
- Eugène Trudeau 1856-1867
- Auguste Trudeau 1867-1886
- Jean B. Vien 1886-1890
- Eugène Costin 1890-1915
- P. E. Theriault 1915-1920
- J. Napoléon Côté 1920-1927
- J. Ferguson 1927-1931
- J. Napoléon Côté 1931-1935
- Joseph Ferguson 1935-1951
- Joseph-Narcisse Rioux 1951-1970
- Yves Packwood 1970-1971
- Owen Gleeton 1971-1972
- Paul-Roger Caron 1972-1978
- Yvon Élément 1978-1981

== Climate ==
Cap-des-Rosiers has a humid continental climate (Köppen Dfb). The average annual temperature in Cap-des-Rosiers is 3.6 °C (38.5 °F). The average annual rainfall is 1,195.1 mm (47.05 in) with October as the wettest month. The temperatures are highest on average in July, at around 16.2 °C (61.2 °F), and lowest in January, at around −9.8 °C (14.4 °F). The highest temperature ever recorded in Cap-des-Rosiers was 33.0 °C (91.4 °F) on 9 August 2005; the coldest temperature ever recorded was −32.0 °C (−25.6 °F) on 17 February 2008.

Climate data for Cap-des-Rosiers Lighthouse, 1981–2010 normals, extremes 1973–present
Month	Jan	Feb	Mar	Apr	May	Jun	Jul	Aug	Sep	Oct	Nov	Dec	Year
Record high °C (°F)	12.2 (54.0)	11.0 (51.8)	12.8 (55.0)	27.0 (80.6)	28.0 (82.4)	33.0 (91.4)	31.0 (87.8)	33.0 (91.4)	30.0 (86.0)	27.0 (80.6)	22.2 (72.0)	12.8 (55.0)	33.0 (91.4)
Mean daily maximum °C (°F)	−5.7 (21.7)	−5.3 (22.5)	−0.9 (30.4)	4.5 (40.1)	11.0 (51.8)	16.4 (61.5)	20.2 (68.4)	20.0 (68.0)	15.9 (60.6)	9.7 (49.5)	3.7 (38.7)	−2.0 (28.4)	7.3 (45.1)
Daily mean °C (°F)	−9.8 (14.4)	−9.3 (15.3)	−4.5 (23.9)	1.3 (34.3)	7.2 (45.0)	12.3 (54.1)	16.2 (61.2)	16.0 (60.8)	11.9 (53.4)	6.2 (43.2)	0.7 (33.3)	−5.3 (22.5)	3.6 (38.5)
Mean daily minimum °C (°F)	−13.9 (7.0)	−13.3 (8.1)	−8.1 (17.4)	−1.8 (28.8)	3.3 (37.9)	8.3 (46.9)	12.2 (54.0)	12.0 (53.6)	8.0 (46.4)	2.8 (37.0)	−2.3 (27.9)	−8.7 (16.3)	−0.1 (31.8)
Record low °C (°F)	−32.0 (−25.6)	−32.0 (−25.6)	−30.0 (−22.0)	−16.0 (3.2)	−5.0 (23.0)	−2.0 (28.4)	2.0 (35.6)	1.7 (35.1)	−3.0 (26.6)	−7.0 (19.4)	−15.0 (5.0)	−27.5 (−17.5)	−32.0 (−25.6)
Average precipitation mm (inches)	89.9 (3.54)	77.5 (3.05)	103.6 (4.08)	84.3 (3.32)	104.3 (4.11)	93.1 (3.67)	118.6 (4.67)	103.2 (4.06)	86.1 (3.39)	126.2 (4.97)	115.2 (4.54)	93.1 (3.67)	1,195.1 (47.05)
Average rainfall mm (inches)	18.1 (0.71)	17.5 (0.69)	32.9 (1.30)	52.9 (2.08)	103.1 (4.06)	93.1 (3.67)	118.6 (4.67)	103.2 (4.06)	86.1 (3.39)	124.8 (4.91)	95.8 (3.77)	34.9 (1.37)	881.0 (34.69)
Average snowfall cm (inches)	71.8 (28.3)	60.0 (23.6)	70.7 (27.8)	31.9 (12.6)	1.2 (0.5)	0.0 (0.0)	0.0 (0.0)	0.0 (0.0)	0.0 (0.0)	1.3 (0.5)	19.4 (7.6)	58.2 (22.9)	314.6 (123.9)
Average precipitation days (≥ 0.2 mm)	11.1	8.7	10.9	11.0	13.0	11.2	14.6	11.8	10.9	13.0	12.5	12.4	140.9
Average rainy days (≥ 0.2 mm)	1.5	1.3	2.8	7.5	12.9	11.2	14.6	11.8	10.9	13.0	9.4	3.6	100.4
Average snowy days (≥ 0.2 cm)	10.3	7.7	8.7	4.3	0.20	0.0	0.0	0.0	0.0	0.15	3.6	9.3	44.2
Source: Environment Canada

== See also ==
- List of lighthouses in Canada

== Gallery ==
Cap-des-Rosiers Lighthouse
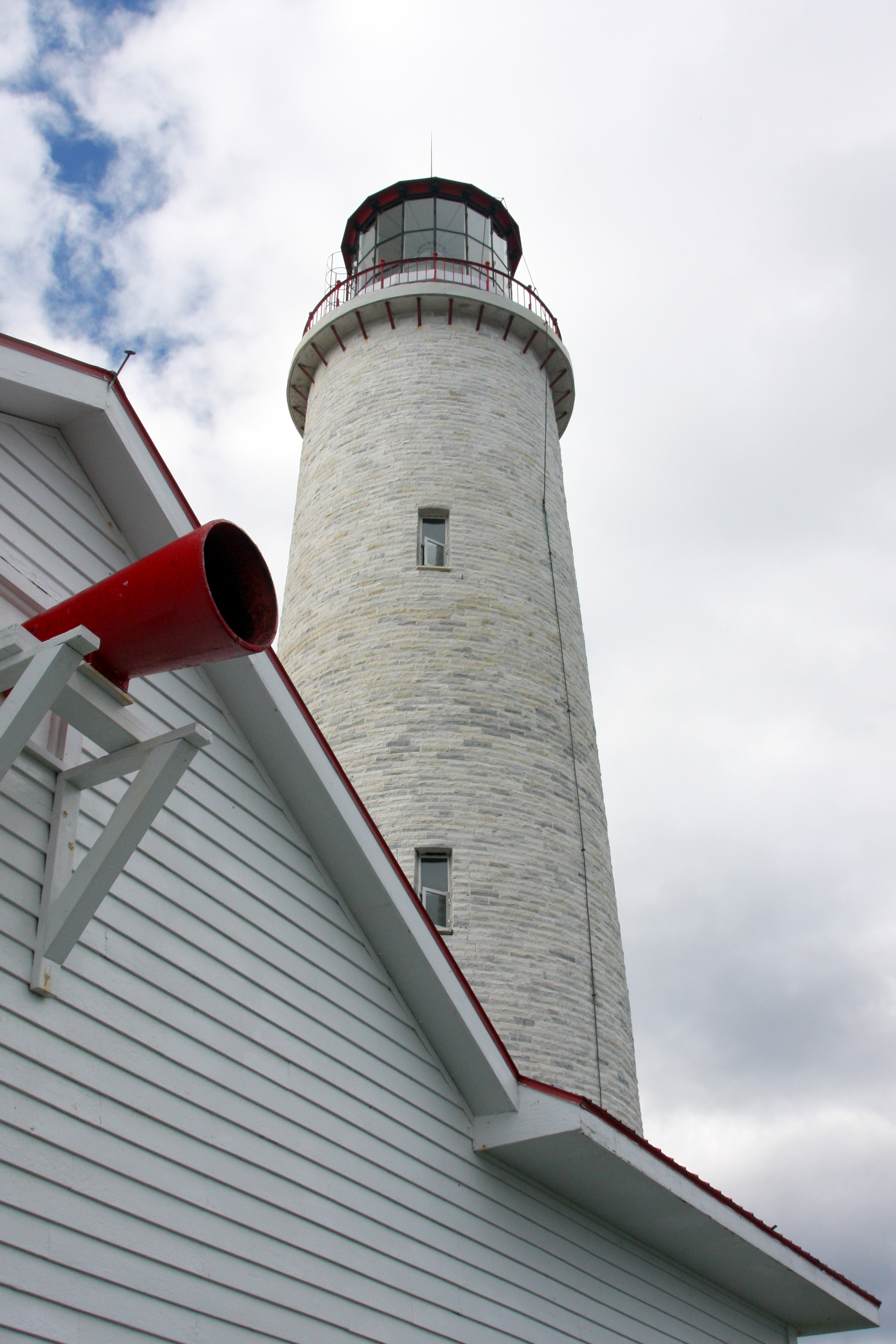
Cap-des-Rosiers Lighthouse & Foghorn Building

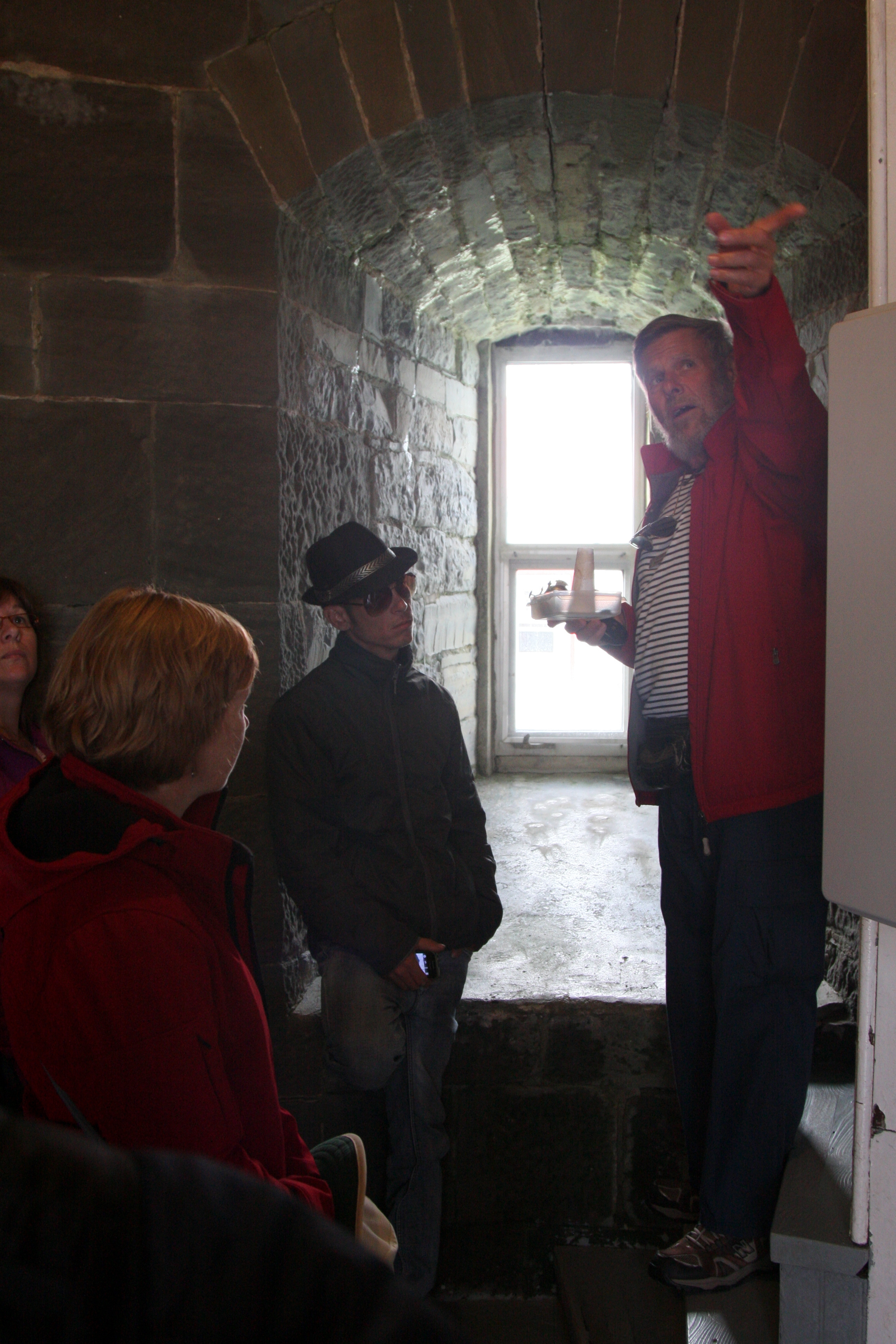
The walls are over seven feet thick at the base, tapering to three feet at the top.

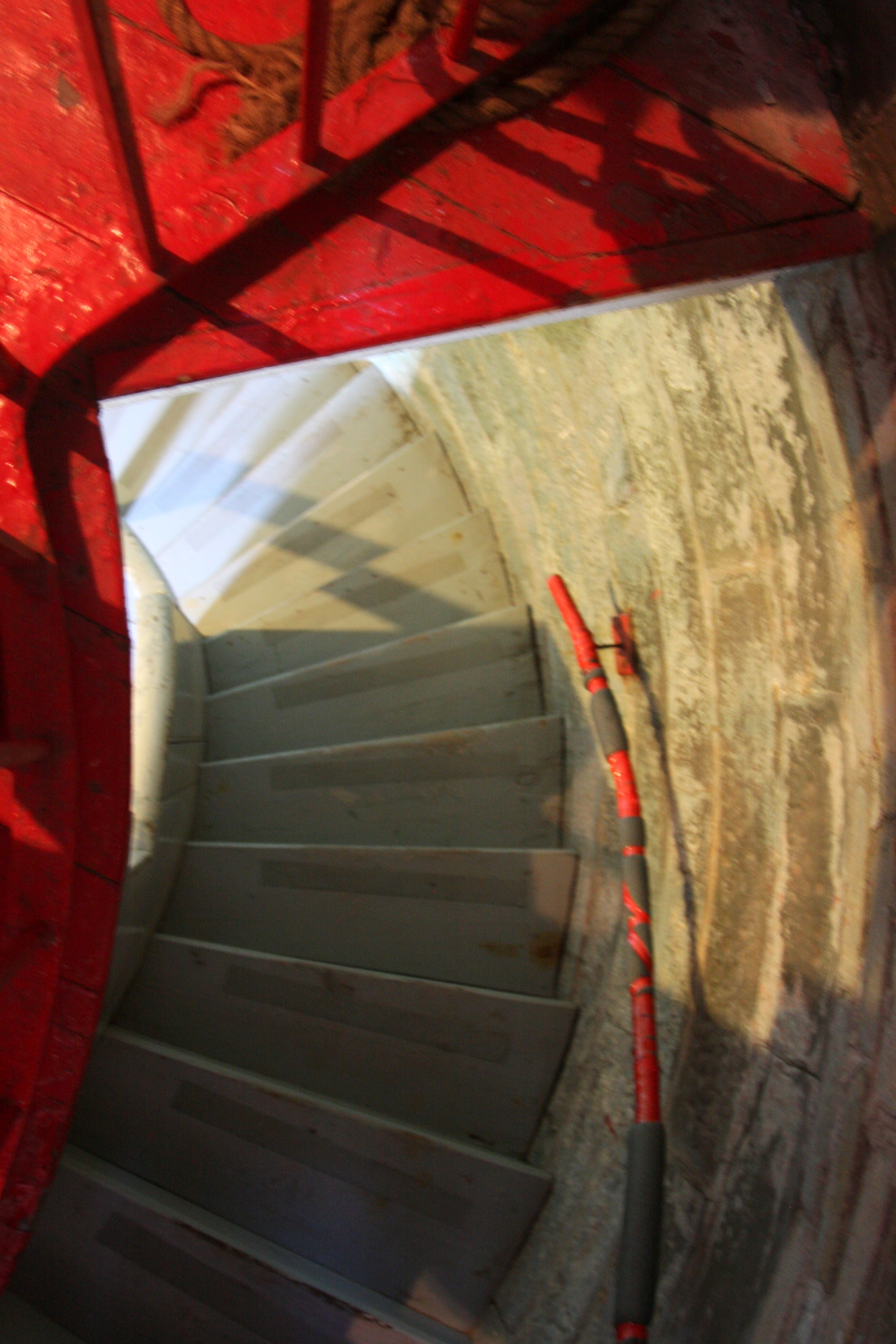
Looking down from the lantern at the stairs that lead up the tower.

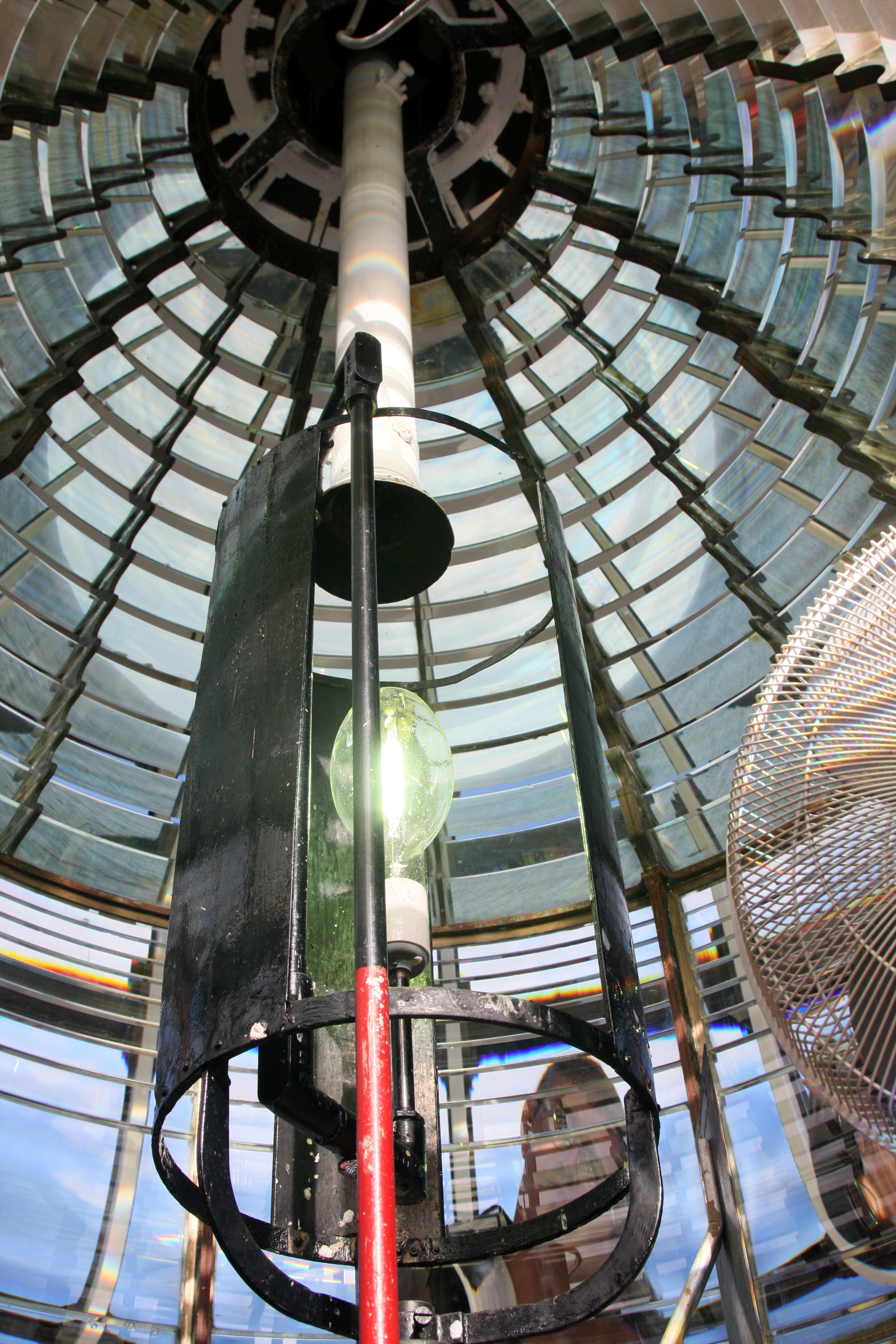
The light source is now an electric discharge lamp. This is an occulting light, a rhythmic light in which the duration of light in each period is longer than the total duration of darkness, accomplished by this vertical rotating shutter which periodically shades the light from view. In this case, the light shines for 15 seconds, and eclipses (goes dark) for 5 seconds, and repeats.

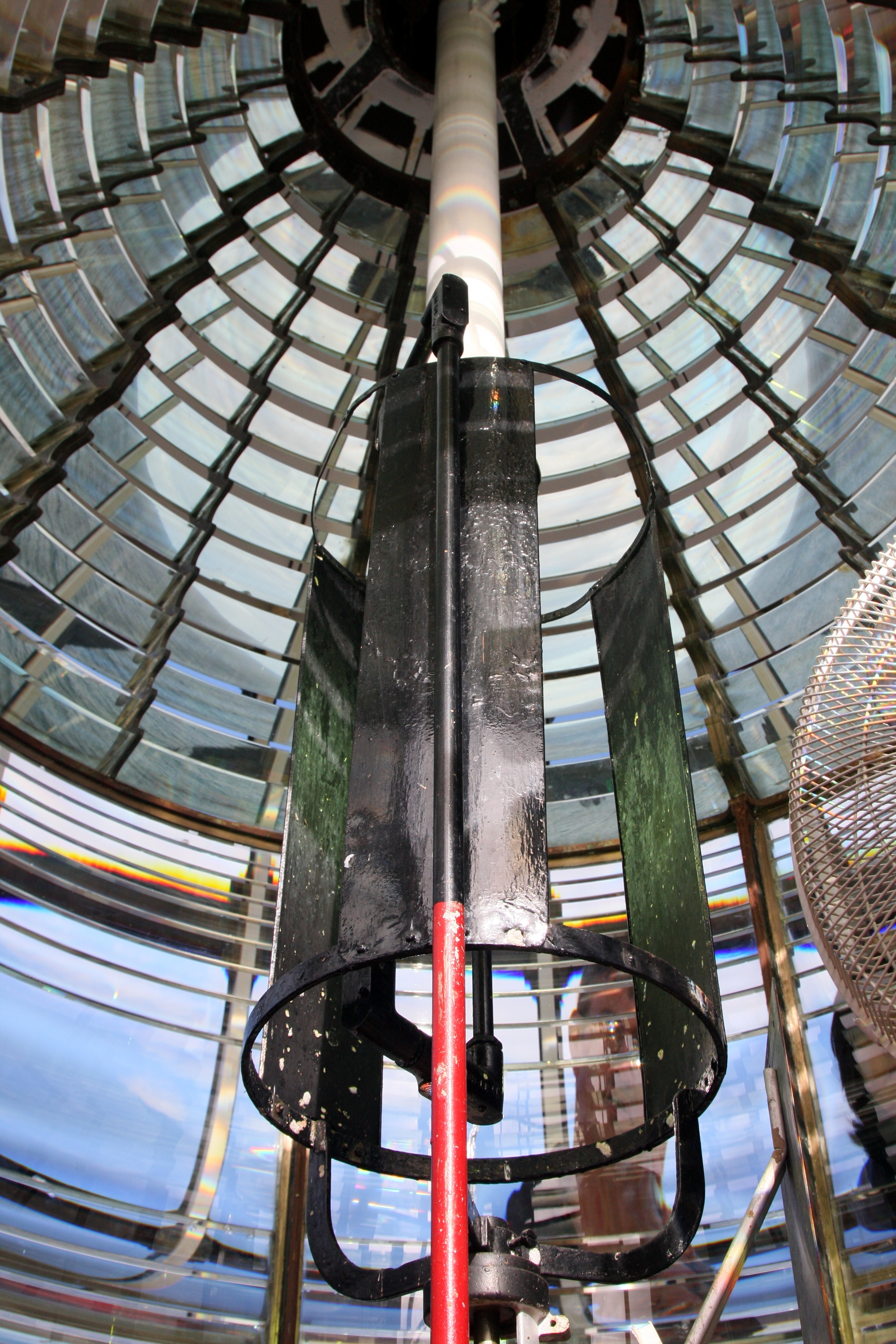
The rotating shutter periodically shades the light from view.

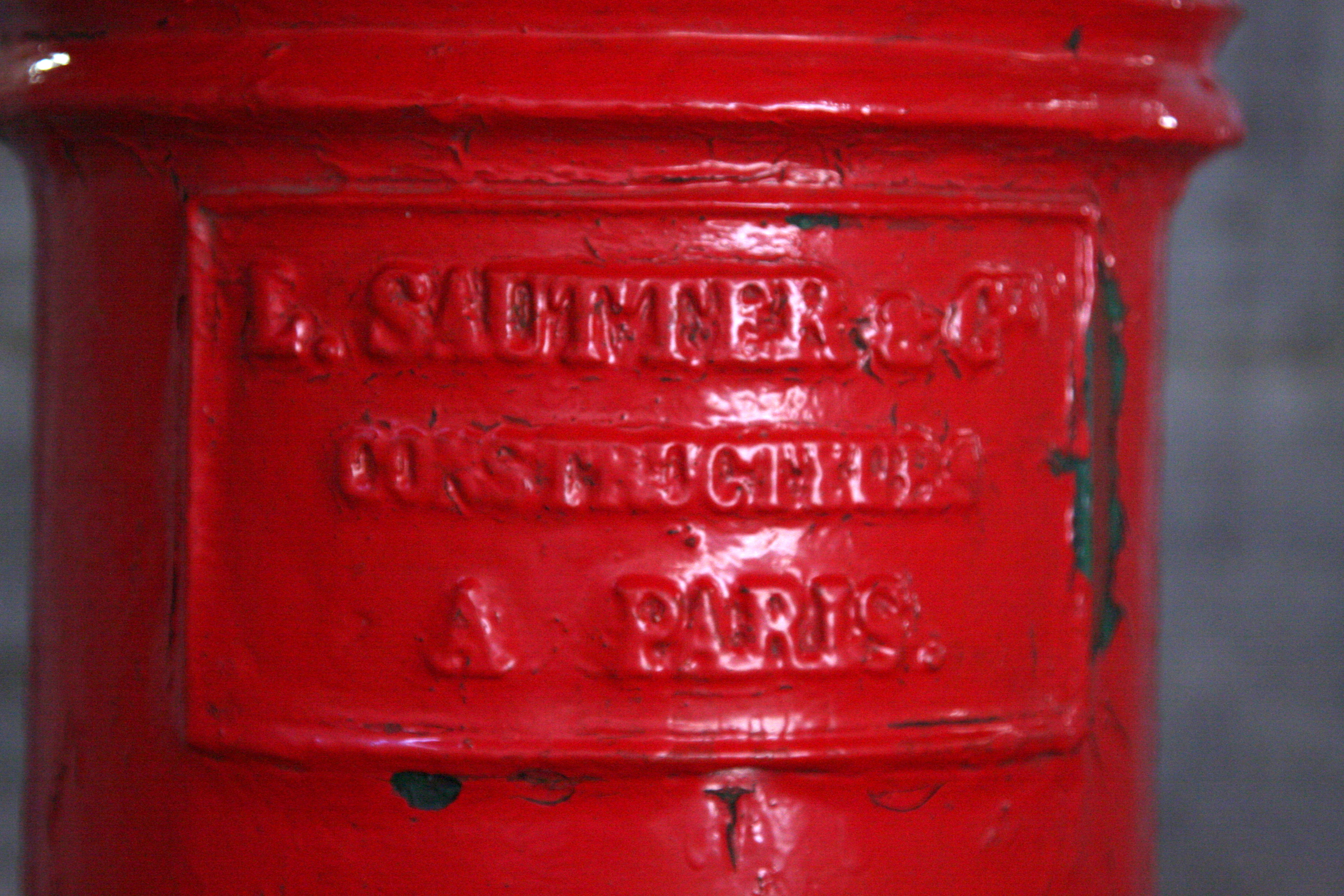
The lamp manufacturer's plaque: L. Sautter & Cie. Constructeurs A Paris.

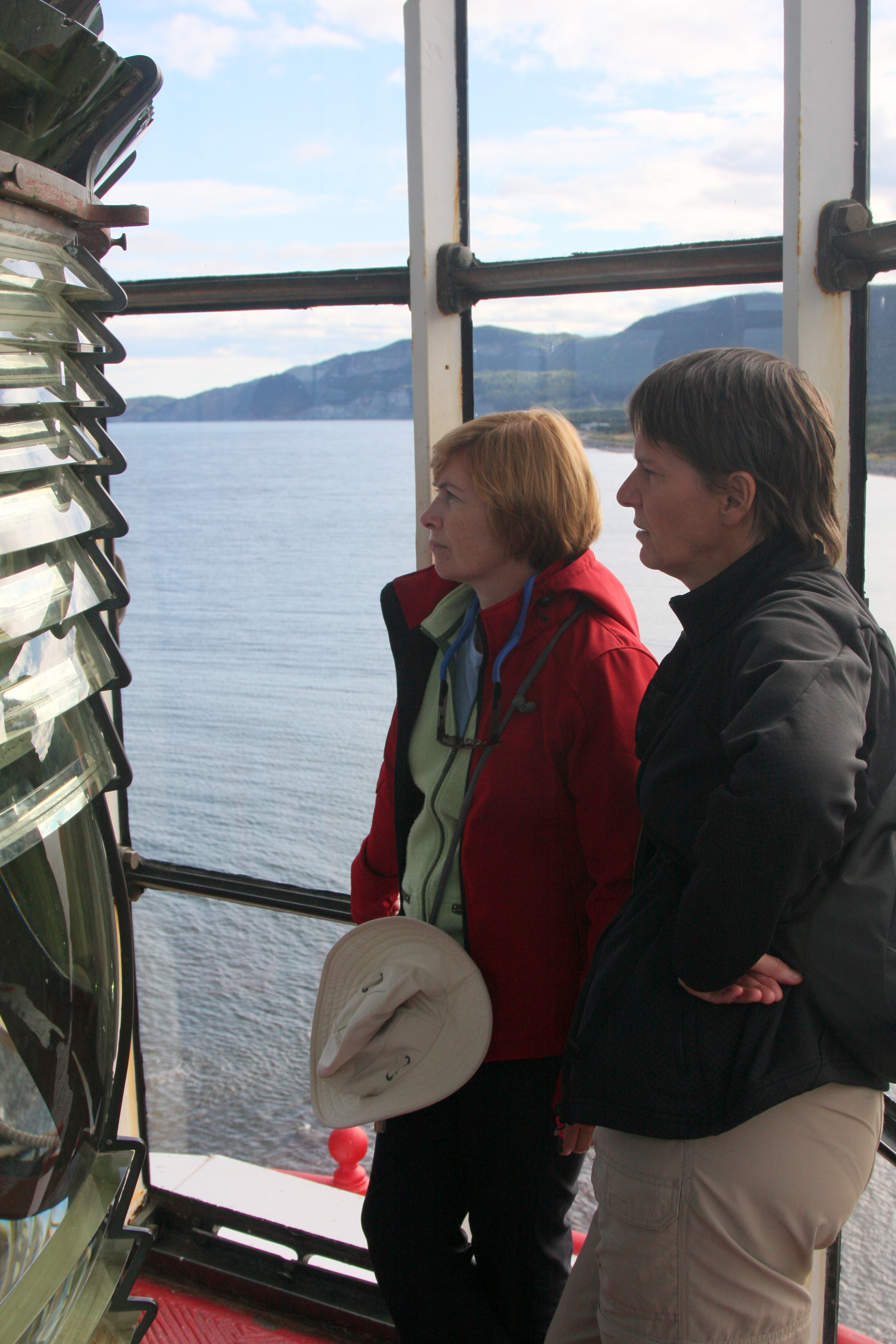
The optic in the lantern, with the shoreline of the Gaspé Peninsula in the distance.

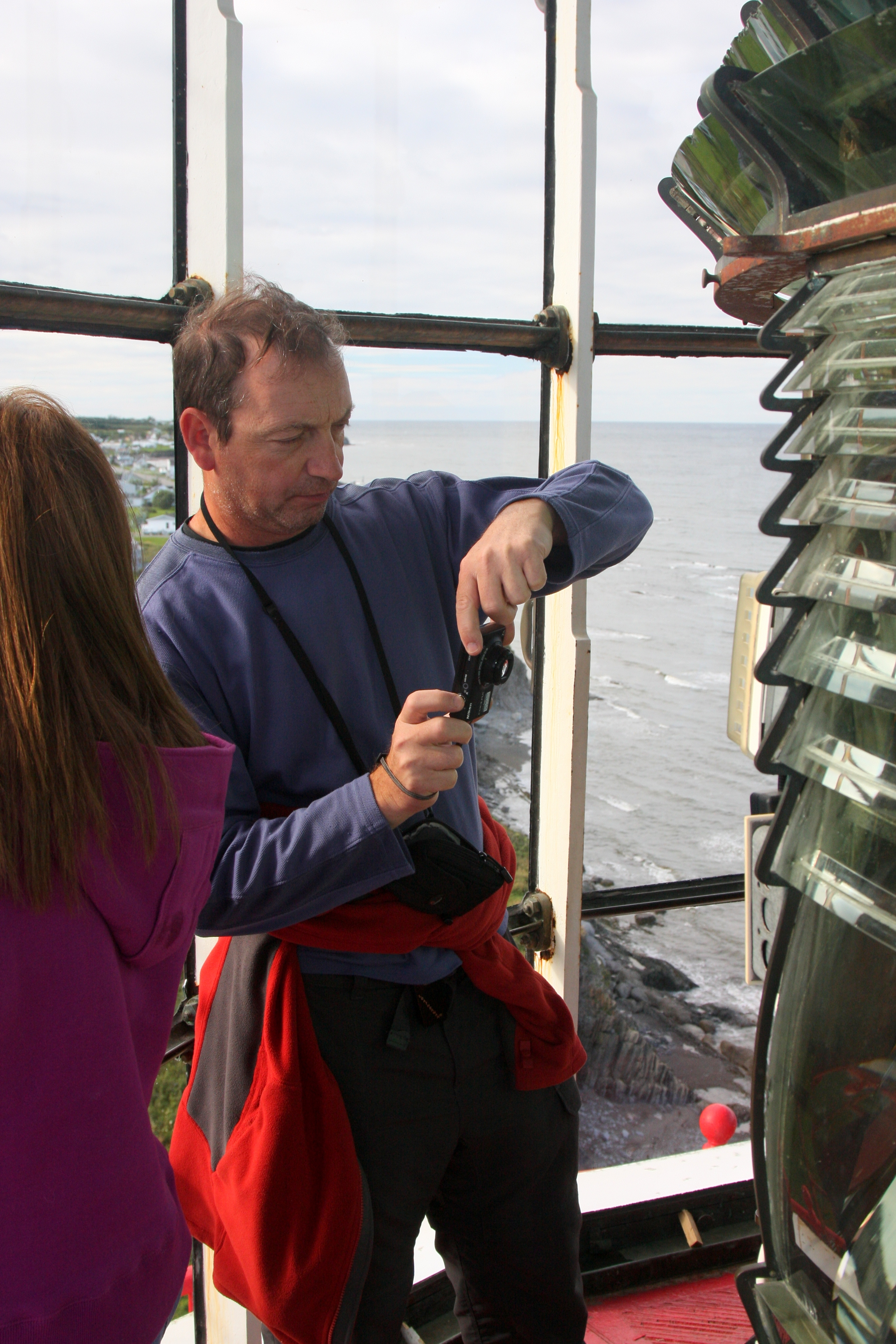
The optic in the lantern, with the shoreline of the Gaspé Peninsula and the St. Lawrence River in the distance.
