= Cap-au-Saumon Lighthouse =

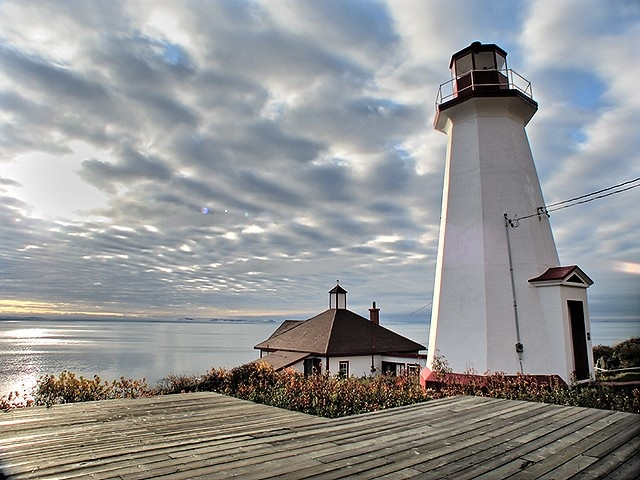
- Location: Saint-Siméon, La Malbaie, Canada
- Coordinates: 47°46′N 69°55′W

Tower
- Constructed: 1894
- Height: 14 m (46 ft)
- Operator: Canadian Coast Guard
- Heritage: recognized heritage site, heritage lighthouse

Light
- Focal height: 70 m (230 ft)
- Range: 4.5 km (2.8 mi)

The Cap-au-Saumon lighthouse is a lighthouse on the St. Lawrence River in Quebec. It is located at Saint-Siméon, in the region of Charlevoix, midway between Port-au-Persil and Port-Saumon.

== Description ==
Commissioned in 1894, the Cap-au-Saumon lighthouse is an octagonal high tower of 14 metres (46 ft). It is surrounded by several outbuildings, including the lighthouse keeper's house. The lighthouse is perched on an escarpment of 30 metres (98 ft) dominating the river. It is accessible on foot by a path of 4.5 kilometres (2.8 mi).

== History ==
The Carré family has provided three successive caretakers for the Cap-au-Saumon lighthouse:

- Louis-Philippe Carré (1942–1966);
- Edmour Carré, son of Louis-Philippe (1966–1972);
- Neil Carré, son of Louis-Philippe (1972–1982).

The lighthouse remained abandoned for about thirty years before being restored carefully. It is now rented by the week.
