= Lucy Islands =

Small archipelago off of Canada

Native name: Lax Spinna
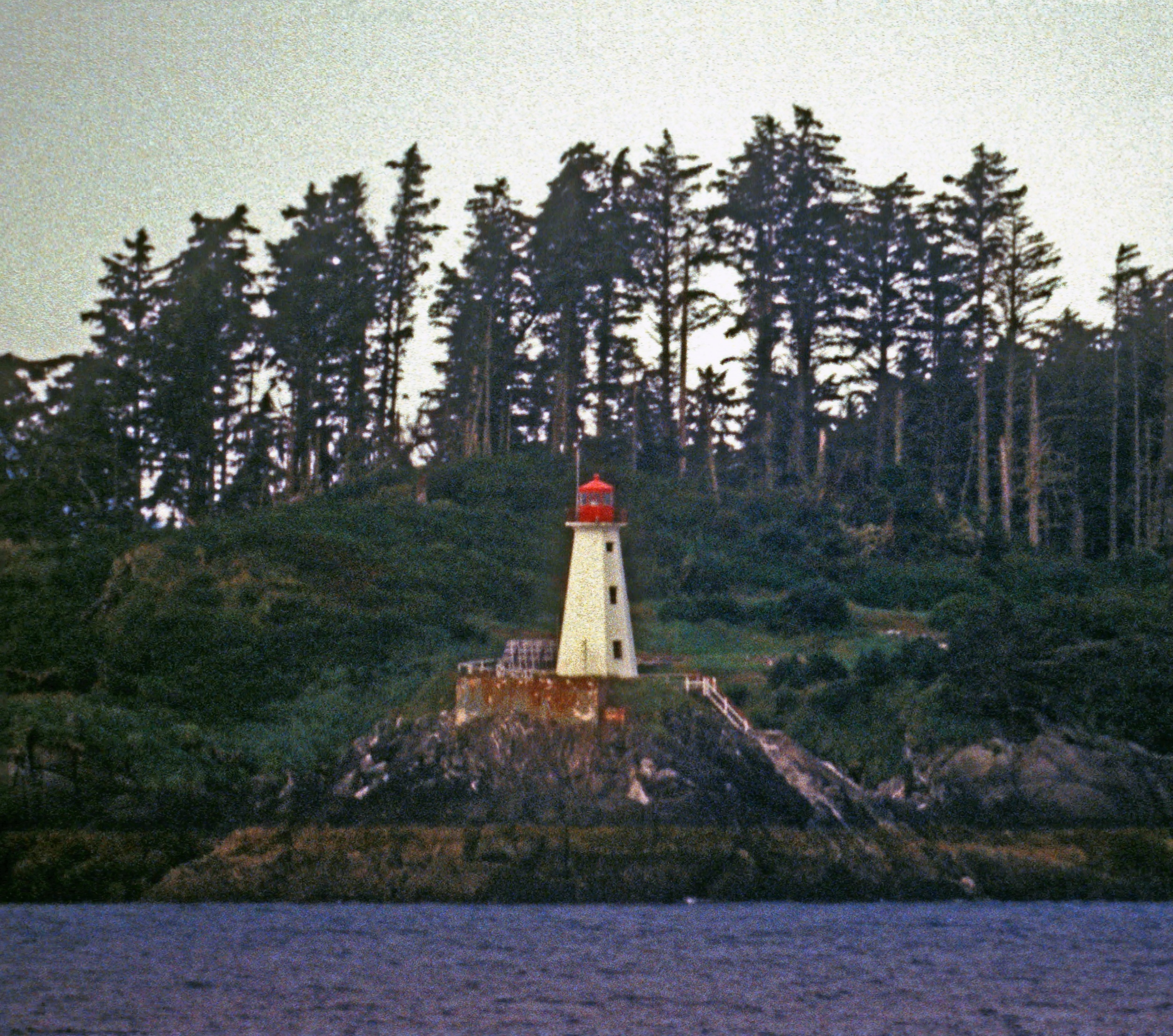
- Lucy Island Lighthouse, built 1907

- Location within British Columbia

Geography
- Location: Chatham Sound
- Coordinates: 54°18′01″N 130°37′08″W
- Area: 73.95 km^{2} (28.55 sq mi)
- Highest elevation: 59 m (194 ft)

Administration
- Canada
- Province: British Columbia

Additional information
- Time zone: Pacific

The Lucy Islands (Tsimshian: Lax Spinna, lit. 'on shoulders') are a small archipelago off the North Coast of the province of British Columbia in Canada. The low-lying and heavily forested (Sitka spruce) group, named after its largest island, Lucy Island, constitutes a provincially protected conservancy area that contains some of the North Coast's oldest archeological sites, a nationally significant seabird population, and a prominent 20th-century lighthouse.

== Location ==
The Lucy Islands Conservancy is an archipelago located about 15 km west of the North Coast's largest city, the port of Prince Rupert. The archipelago lies in the middle of Chatham Sound, north of the juncture with Hecate Strait, and between the much-larger Melville Island and Digby Island.

== Naming ==
The islands were named by Captain George Henry Richards of HMS Hecate circa 1862 to honour Lucy McNeill, daughter of Hudson's Bay Company official William Henry McNeill and his first wife, Mathilda, a Kaigani Haida chief. Lucy was a "miraculously unfettered Victorian female", according to B.C. memoirist Helen Meilleur. "She was so adaptable that she could occupy the VIP cabin aboard the Labouchere ... and then set off in a canoe for weeks of weather-exposed travel to Indian villages." She married Hamilton Moffatt of the Hudson's Bay Company and resided in Victoria as of 1906.

== Human habitation ==
Ancient shell middens and house depressions on the islands are an indicator of human occupation dating back possibly 6,000 years. Some of the oldest archaeological sites on the North Coast are located on the islands, including the earliest-known use of a rectangular house in the region.

Traditionally, the Lucy Islands are included in the territory of the Gitwilgyoots, a Tsimshian-speaking tribe that wintered in the Prince Rupert area at the time of European contact. In late spring, during the seasonal round, the Gitwilgyoots moved to the outer islands west of Prince Rupert for a period of marine fishing, shellfish gathering and sea mammal hunting before returning to the Skeena River in early summer for the salmon runs.

In the winter of 1984/5, strong winds felled two trees above a shell midden and exposed ancient human remains of a child, a young adult female and an older male. With the approval of the Metlakatla First Nation, the remains were analysed by the Canadian Museum of Civilization. A genetic study published in PLOS ONE in 2013 linked the 5,500-year-old female remains to 2,500-year-old remains found on nearby Dodge Island. The groundbreaking study, the first to use new techniques to analyse the complete mitochondrial genome, also found that a living Tsimshian woman from the Metlakatla First Nation near Prince Rupert had a matrilineal DNA link to the 5,500-year-old female remains from the Lucy Islands. The study's findings may indicate an enduring occupation of the geographical region by local First Nations.

By the 20th century, the sole residents of the Lucy Islands were lighthouse keepers. The original light above their residence was replaced by a tower built in 1907 on the east point of the main island. The Canadian Coast Guard destaffed the lighthouse in 1988.

== Protected area ==
In 2008, the provincial government established the new Lucy Islands Conservancy under the Protected Areas of British Columbia Act. It protects critical seabird nesting habitat and supports contemporary marine food harvesting as well as popular recreation opportunities.

The conservancy protects the 28 hectares of land throughout the archipelago as well as 178 hectares of foreshore out to 200 metres from the natural boundary of the sea.

The conservancy is collaboratively managed by BC Parks with the Metlakatla and Lax-kw'alaams First Nations. The partnership replaced a rotten and hazardous boardwalk to permit recreational visits while protecting archaeological and bird-nesting features.

== Seabirds ==
The islands are home to a significant avian population and were cited by the Metlakatla Governing Council as an area of concern in their Joint Review Panel submission that opposed the proposed Enbridge Northern Gateway Pipelines project.

The conservancy is a nationally significant breeding site for rhinoceros auklets, that dig long burrows where they make their nests. Lucy Islands is the sixth-largest colony in the province. The 25,300 nesting pairs (1983) also represent about 5.4% of the global population.

In 1983, as many as 197 pigeon guillemots (or 1.9% of the estimated national population) were recorded among the islands. By the following year, just 54 pigeon guillemots were recorded. glaucous-winged gulls and black oystercatchers have also been recorded at the site.

Seabirds of Lucy Islands

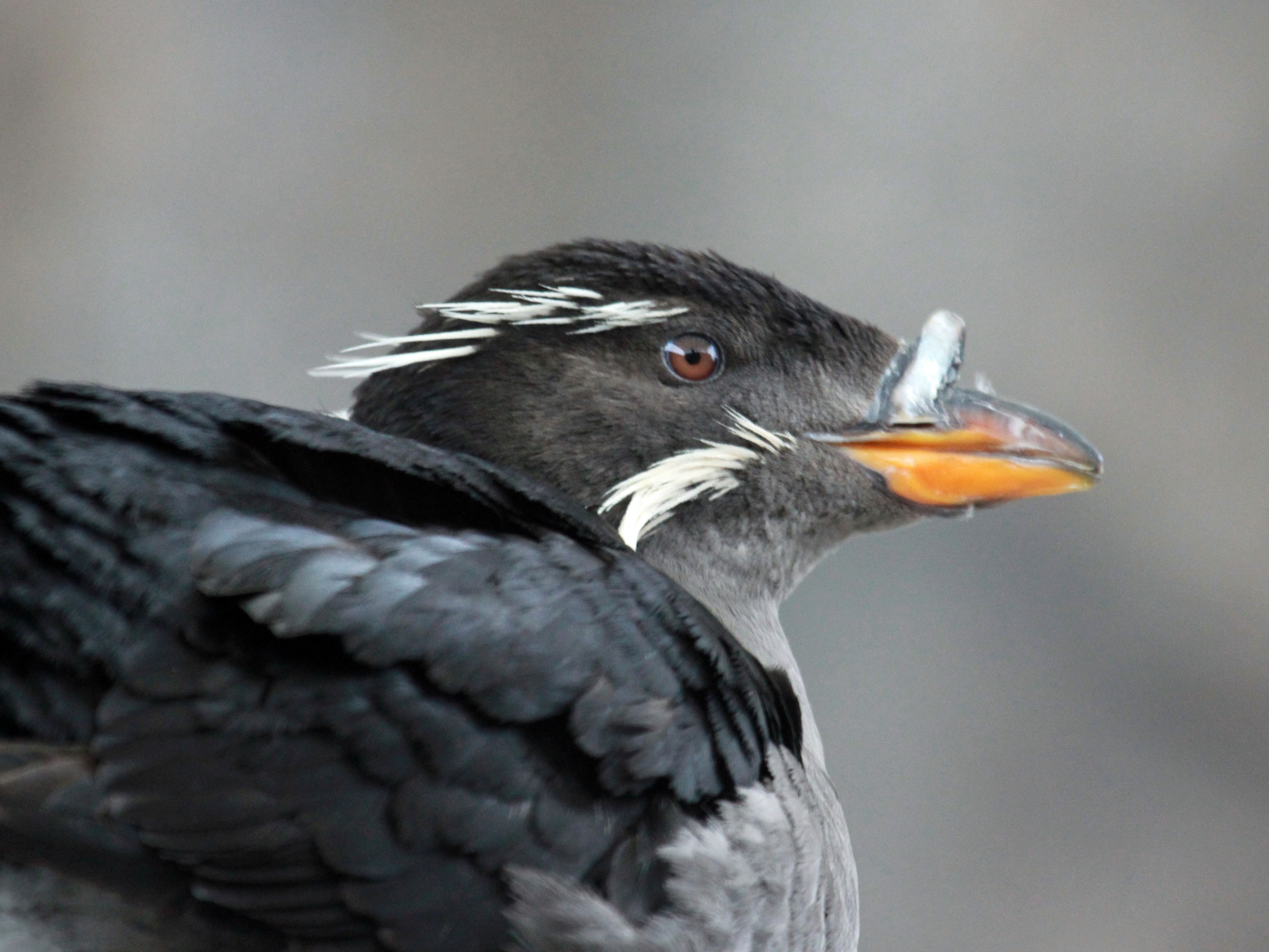
Rhinoceros auklet

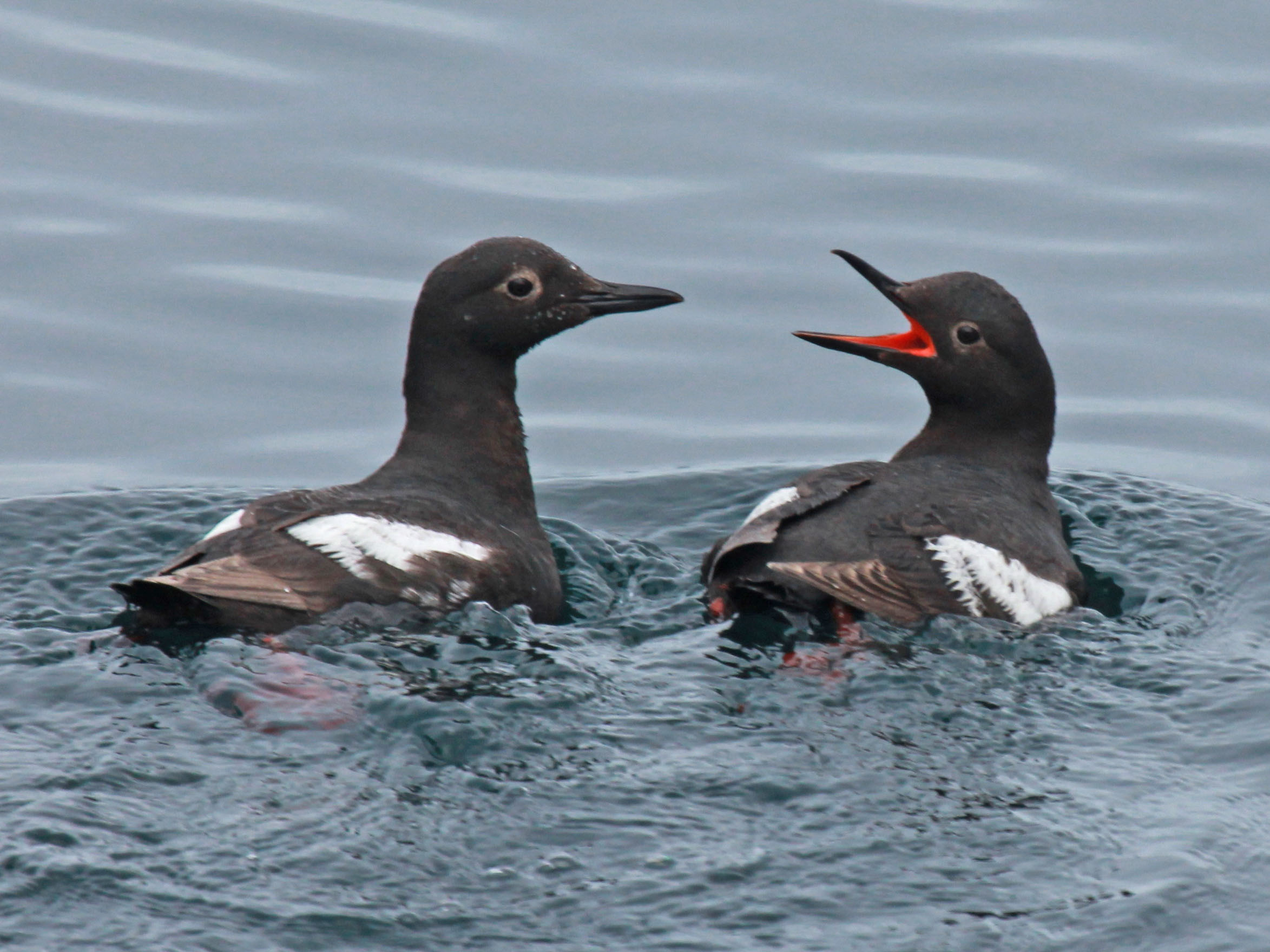
Pigeon guillemot pair

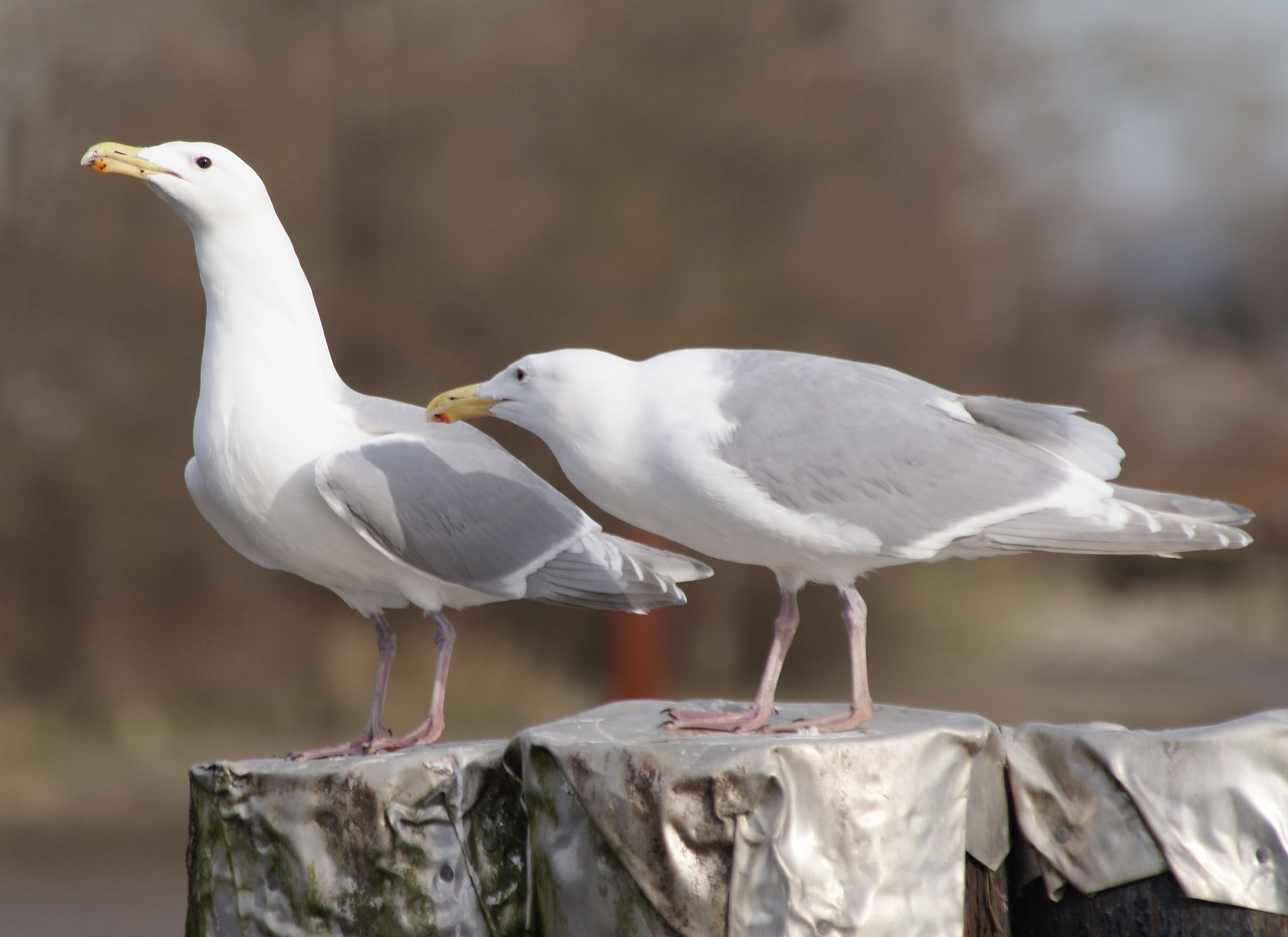
Pair of glaucous-winged gulls

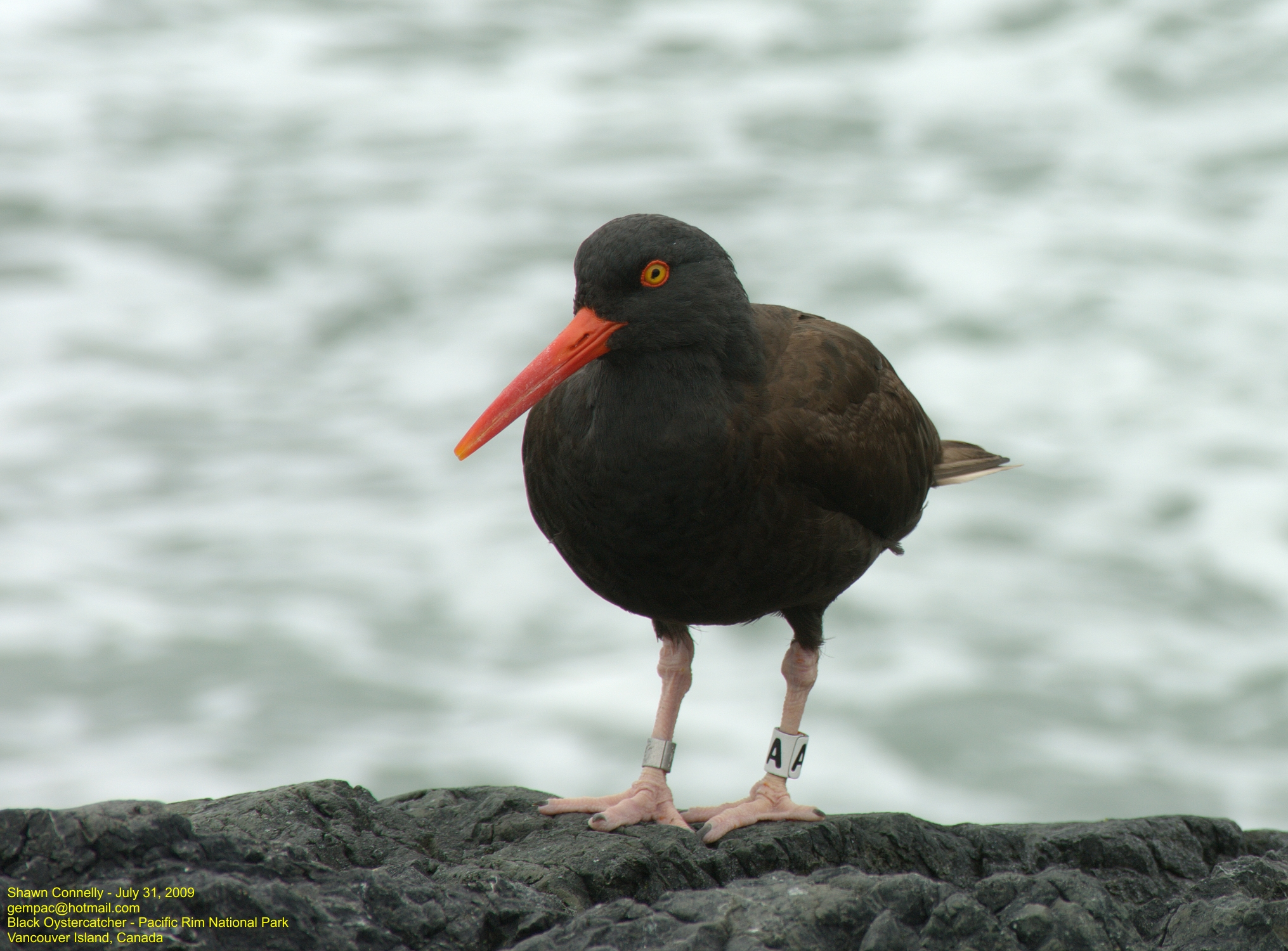
Black oystercatcher with leg band
