= Mulholland Point Lighthouse =

Lighthouse in Bay of Fundy, New Brunswick, Canada

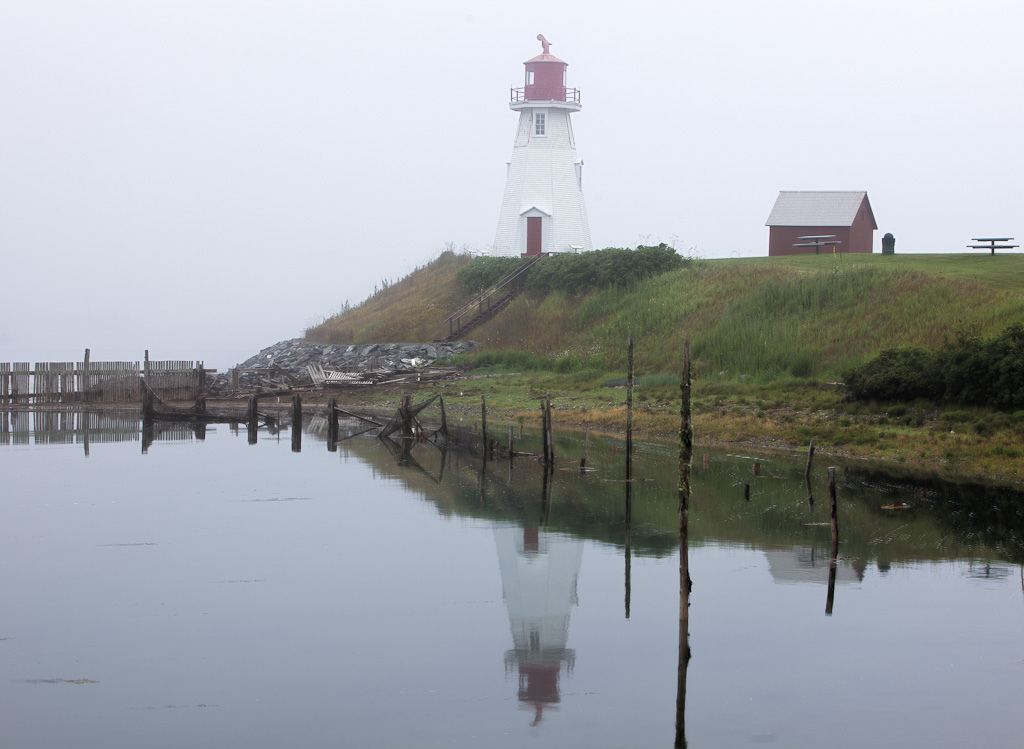
- Location: Campobello Island; Charlotte County; New Brunswick; Canada
- Coordinates: 44°52′N 66°59′W

Tower
- Constructed: 1885
- Construction: wooden tower
- Height: 13 m (43 ft)
- Shape: octagonal tower with balcony and lantern
- Markings: white tower and gallery, red lantern and trim

Light
- Focal height: 20 m (66 ft)

Mulholland Point Lighthouse is situated on Campobello Island in the Bay of Fundy, New Brunswick, Canada.

Situated inside Roosevelt Campobello International Park overlooking the international bridge, it is only lighthouse jointly owned and operated by Canada and the United States.

In 1963 the light was discontinued, and the structure sold to Clifford Calder who sold it to the Look family, who later donated it to the park as a memorial. It is not open to the public.

It is adjacent to a small whale research station.
