= Cape Croker Lighthouse =

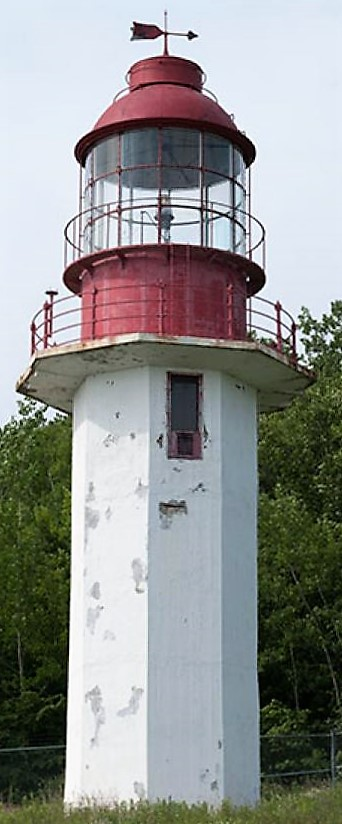
- Location: Cape Croker; Georgian Bay; Ontario; Canada
- Coordinates: 44°57′21.5″N 80°57′37.9″W

Tower
- Constructed: 1898 (first) 1902 (current)
- Construction: concrete tower
- Height: 15.9 metres (52 ft)
- Shape: octagonal
- Markings: white tower, red balcony and lantern

Light
- First lit: 1902 (current)
- Deactivated: 1986
- Focal height: 18.7 metres (61 ft)
- Lens: Fresnel lens

The Cape Croker Lighthouse is a lighthouse located on the south-east corner of Neyaashiinigmiing 27 native reserve in Ontario, Canada. It is a part of the Chippewas of Nawash Unceded First Nation.

It was first built in 1898, but was replaced in 1902 with the current lighthouse. The lighthouse was the first of its type and was the first to have an electrically ran light and foghorn. The lighthouse is an octagonal lighthouse, with a height of 18 metres (59 ft). The original lighthouse was a wooden lighthouse. The lighthouse has a fresnel light and its range is 24 km (15 mi).

== History ==
=== Original lighthouse ===
The original lighthouse was a wooden structure built in 1898. Also containing a foghorn. It stood 65 feet (20 m) from the edge of the water. Its height was 25 feet (7.6 m) and was painted white. It was the first lighthouse in Canada to have an electric light and foghorn run by power produced on site. The building were erected for $3,559 and the gasoline engines and power plant for $3,358.

=== Current lighthouse ===
Richard Chapman was hired as the first keeper. In a month he found out the electric equipment didn't work properly and was forced to use a fixed white oil light until the issue could be resolved. In 1903 the characteristic of the lighthouse was altered to show a fixed light for 23 seconds followed by an ellipse for 4.5 seconds. The same year a fog horn run by compressed air replaced the electric fog horn. The new horn sounded for 15 seconds separated by 15 seconds of silence. In 1905, a separate fog alarm building was built just south of the lighthouse, forty feet from the water. In 1908 a concrete-lined well was added as well as a dock for receiving coal and other supplies needed for the facility. In 1927, the steam fog alarm plant was replaced by an oil plant. The lighthouse was mostly isolated from the rest of the Bruce Peninsula, besides from boat and walking until Keeper Norman Whetton spent two years building a road. After finishing work, he took his motorboat and cleared the next section of road. One the road was completed he and his family would take the road to arrive in April and Depart in December. John Adams who served from 1968 to 1979 recalls preventing a fire when a lightning bolt hit the fog alarm building. The last keeper was Fredric Jerome Proulx, who left in 1986 after six years of service. In 1975 the residence and the fog alarm were demolished leaving only the concrete lighthouse. In 2007 the Canadian Coast Guard removed the Fresnel lens from the tower as vandalism was threatening its safety. The Bruce County Museum and Cultural Centre enter negotiations so it could display the lens at the museum. In 2009 the museum received the lens.

== Poem ==
In 1966 Norman Whetton wife, Juanita Bourke wrote a poem that was published in the November–December 1966 edition of the dot.

On “The Light” Before Christmas

‘Twas ten days before Christmas and all through the night
Snowflakes danced in the rays of Cape Croker's big light.
Santa jingled his bells up at the North Pole
While I scanned the road full of drifts and potholes.

The wilderness road that would take us from here
Had ruts deep enough to gulp Santa's reindeer.
December was up to its usual tricks
And I thought, with a sigh, “We are in a fix!”

I sprang from my chair to view Georgian Bay -
The Season's last freighter was passing our way.
There was one thing to do ere the end of the year -
Close up the station and get out of here.

Then in a flash, while the fog-horn did clatter,
I saw just the way to settle the matter.
All it would take- now, what was that word?
What we needed was a whirly-bird!

A ‘chopper to sky-lift us over the bluffs
To avoid all the drifts, the potholes and ruts.
Oh for a helicopter, Saint Nicholas, please -
So we can be home for Christmas Eve!

== Keepers ==
- Richard Chapman (1902 – 1910)
- William J. Chapman (1910 – 1940)
- Captain J.D. Chapman (1940)
- NWesley Morrison (1940 – 1942)
- Norman Whetton (1942 – 1965)
- NFrank Rourke (1965 – 1968)
- John Adams (1968 – 1979)
- Fredric Jerome Proulx (1980 – 1986)
