= Fox Point, Newfoundland and Labrador =

Fox Point Lighthouse
- Location: Fox Point, Newfoundland and Labrador, Canada
- Coordinates: 51°21′22″N 55°33′18″W

Tower
- Constructed: 2003
- Height: 8 m (26 ft)
- Shape: square truncated tower with balcony and lantern
- Markings: white (tower), red (balcony, trim), grey (lantern)
- Operator: Lightkeepers Seafood Restaurant

Light
- First lit: 2003
- Focal height: 26.8 m (88 ft)
- Range: 17 nmi (31 km; 20 mi)
- Characteristic: Fl W 10s
- Second light
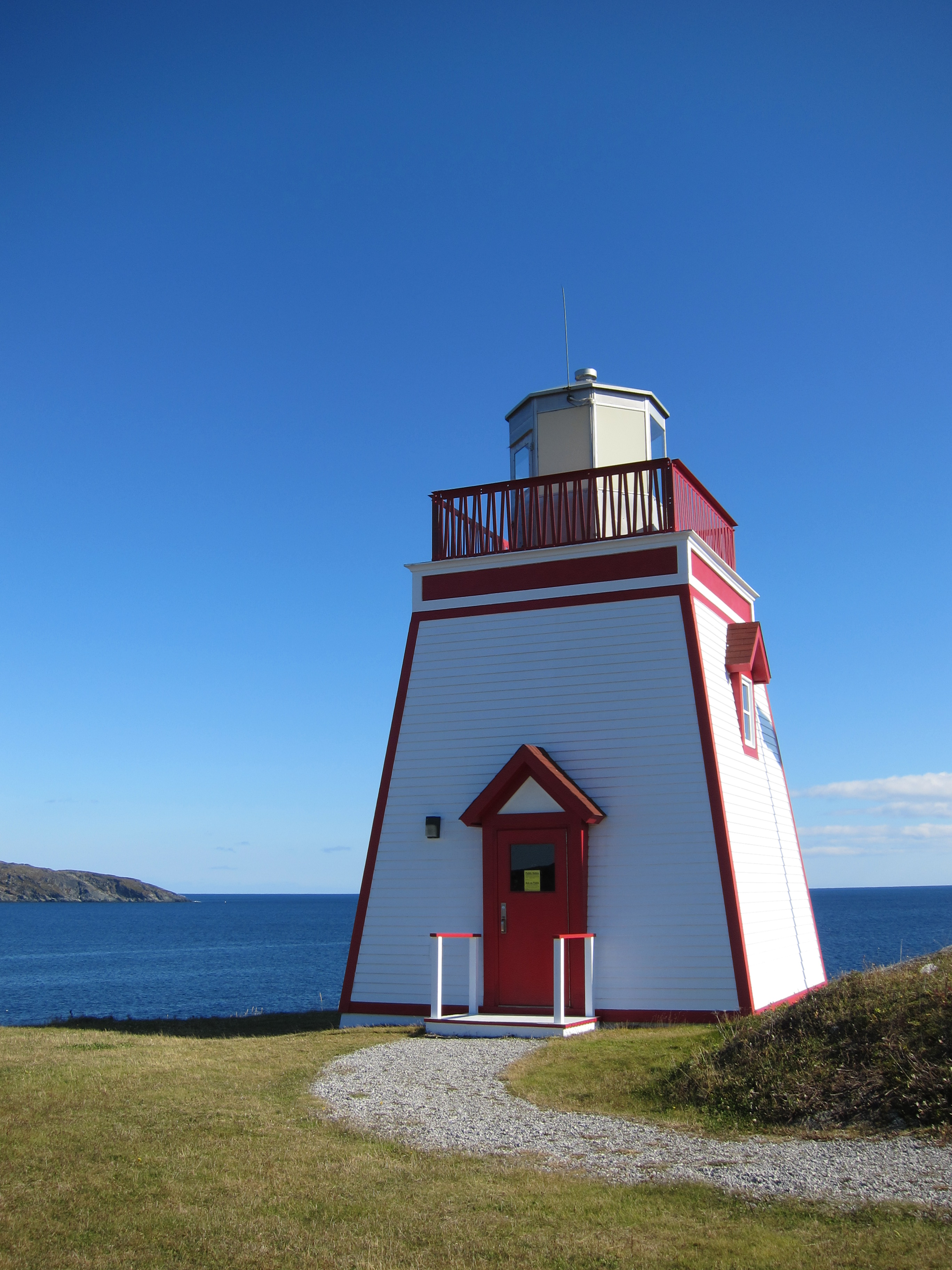
- Constructed: 1960
- Construction: lumber
- Height: 2.7 m (8 ft 10 in)
- Shape: square (tower)
- Deactivated: 2003
- Focal height: 88 ft (27 m)
- Original light
- Constructed: 1912
- Construction: iron (tower)
- Shape: cylindrical tower with balcony and lantern
- Markings: stripe (red, white, vertical direction)
- Deactivated: 1960
- Focal height: 67 ft (20 m)
- Characteristic: Iso W 5s

Fox Point is a settlement in Newfoundland and Labrador.

== See also ==
- List of lighthouses in Canada
