= Ivory Island =

Island in British Columbia, Canada

Coordinates: 52.269632°N 128.406625°W

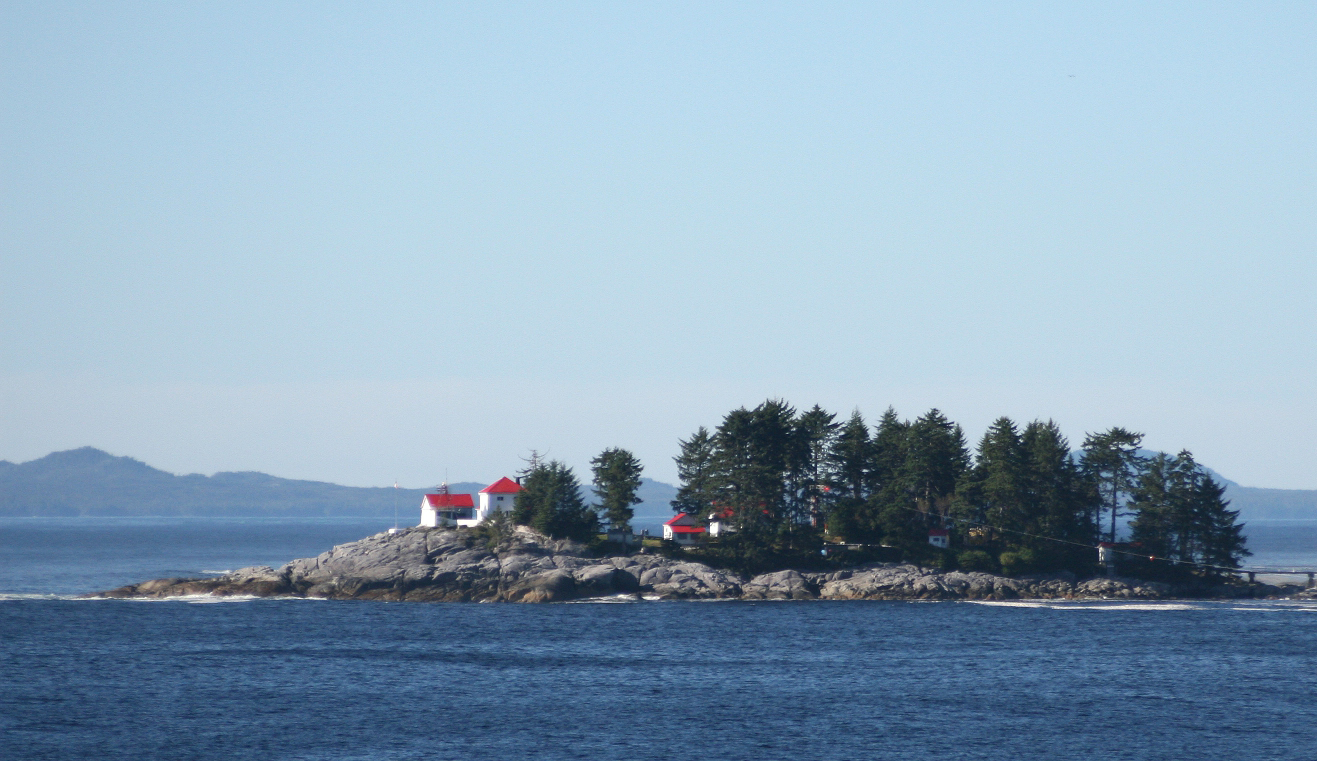
Ivory Island Lightstation

Ivory Island Lightstation is located 14 miles northwest of Bella Bella on the junction of Seaforth Channel and Milbanke Sound on the Inside Passage of British Columbia.

From 1937 to 1955, the Ivory Island lightstation was part of the British Columbia Shore Station Oceanographic Program, collecting coastal water temperature and salinity measurements for the Department of Fisheries and Oceans everyday for 18 years.

== Climate ==
Ivory Island has a wet and mild oceanic climate. (Cfb)

Climate data for Ivory Island (1981–2010)
| Month | Jan | Feb | Mar | Apr | May | Jun | Jul | Aug | Sep | Oct | Nov | Dec | Year |
|---|---|---|---|---|---|---|---|---|---|---|---|---|---|
| Record high °C (°F) | 16.5 (61.7) | 15.5 (59.9) | 19.0 (66.2) | 25.5 (77.9) | 24.5 (76.1) | 33.0 (91.4) | 32.2 (90.0) | 29.0 (84.2) | 29.0 (84.2) | 22.0 (71.6) | 14.4 (57.9) | 15.5 (59.9) | 33.0 (91.4) |
| Mean daily maximum °C (°F) | 6.2 (43.2) | 7.0 (44.6) | 8.0 (46.4) | 10.5 (50.9) | 12.5 (54.5) | 14.5 (58.1) | 16.2 (61.2) | 16.9 (62.4) | 15.3 (59.5) | 11.7 (53.1) | 8.3 (46.9) | 6.7 (44.1) | 11.1 (52.0) |
| Daily mean °C (°F) | 4.3 (39.7) | 4.9 (40.8) | 5.8 (42.4) | 8.0 (46.4) | 10.3 (50.5) | 12.6 (54.7) | 14.3 (57.7) | 14.9 (58.8) | 13.2 (55.8) | 9.8 (49.6) | 6.5 (43.7) | 4.9 (40.8) | 9.1 (48.4) |
| Mean daily minimum °C (°F) | 2.5 (36.5) | 2.8 (37.0) | 3.4 (38.1) | 5.5 (41.9) | 8.1 (46.6) | 10.6 (51.1) | 12.4 (54.3) | 12.9 (55.2) | 11.0 (51.8) | 7.8 (46.0) | 4.6 (40.3) | 3.1 (37.6) | 7.0 (44.6) |
| Record low °C (°F) | −15.0 (5.0) | −10.5 (13.1) | −13.9 (7.0) | −1.7 (28.9) | 0.0 (32.0) | 4.9 (40.8) | 6.1 (43.0) | 5.0 (41.0) | 2.2 (36.0) | −1.0 (30.2) | −12.0 (10.4) | −12.5 (9.5) | −15.0 (5.0) |
| Average precipitation mm (inches) | 297.6 (11.72) | 194.5 (7.66) | 229.5 (9.04) | 211.3 (8.32) | 147.0 (5.79) | 129.1 (5.08) | 118.1 (4.65) | 163.7 (6.44) | 215.2 (8.47) | 353.3 (13.91) | 383.7 (15.11) | 326.3 (12.85) | 2,769.2 (109.02) |
Source: Environment Canada
