= Bacalhao Island =

Bacalhao Island Lighthouse
- Location: Bacalhao Island; Newfoundland; Canada
- Coordinates: 49°41′12.8″N 54°33′24.4″W

Tower
- Constructed: 1894
- Construction: cast iron tower
- Height: 10 metres (33 ft)
- Shape: cylindrical tower with balcony and lantern
- Markings: white and red spiral stripes
- Operator: Canadian Coast Guard
- Heritage: recognized federal heritage building of Canada
- Fog signal: 1 blast every 30s.

Light
- Focal height: 108.8 metres (357 ft)
- Lens: sixth-order Fresnel lens
- Range: 17 nautical miles (31 km; 20 mi)
- Characteristic: Fl W 10s.

Bacalhao Island is an island off Twillingate in Newfoundland. It has a lighthouse. In 1911, it was inhabited by the lighthouse keepers and their families.

== See also ==
- List of lighthouses in Canada
- List of communities in Newfoundland and Labrador
