= Malpeque =

Malpeque can refer to several different things:

== Electoral districts ==
- Malpeque (electoral district), a federal electoral district in Prince Edward Island, Canada

== Geography ==
- Malpeque Bay, a bay in Prince Edward Island, Canada

== Settlements ==
- Malpeque, an unincorporated rural community in Prince Edward Island, Canada
- Malpeque Bay, Prince Edward Island, an incorporated rural municipality in Prince Edward Island, Canada

== Structures ==
- Malpeque Outer Range Lights, a set of lighthouses operated by the Canadian Coast Guard in Prince Edward Island, Canada
- Malpeque Harbour Approach Range Lights, a set of lighthouses operated by the Canadian Coast Guard in Prince Edward Island, Canada
