= Haszard Point Range Front =

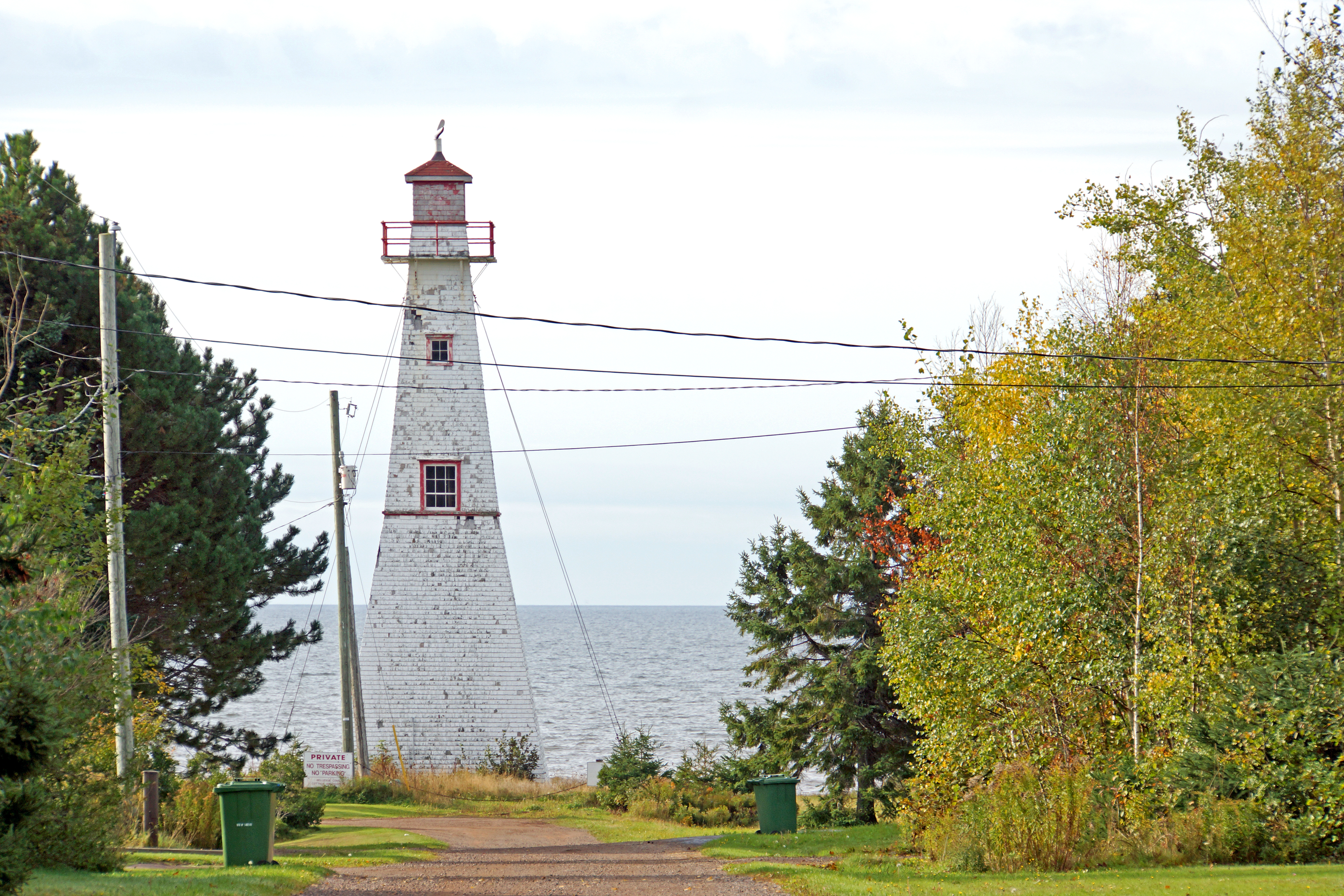
- Location: Stratford; Prince Edward Island; Canada
- Coordinates: 46°11′39.7″N 63°04′25.2″W

Tower
- Constructed: 1889
- Construction: wooden tower
- Height: 17.3 metres (57 ft)
- Shape: square tower with lantern and gallery
- Markings: red with black vertical stripe the front face, white the other sides

Light
- Focal height: 18.3 metres (60 ft)
- Range: 13 nautical miles (24 km; 15 mi)
- Characteristic: F Y
- Canada no.: 991

The Haszard Point Range Front is one of two range lights, the front light and the rear light, on Prince Edward Island, Canada. They were built in 1889, and are still active.

== See also ==
- List of lighthouses in Prince Edward Island
- List of lighthouses in Canada
