= Seacow Head Light =

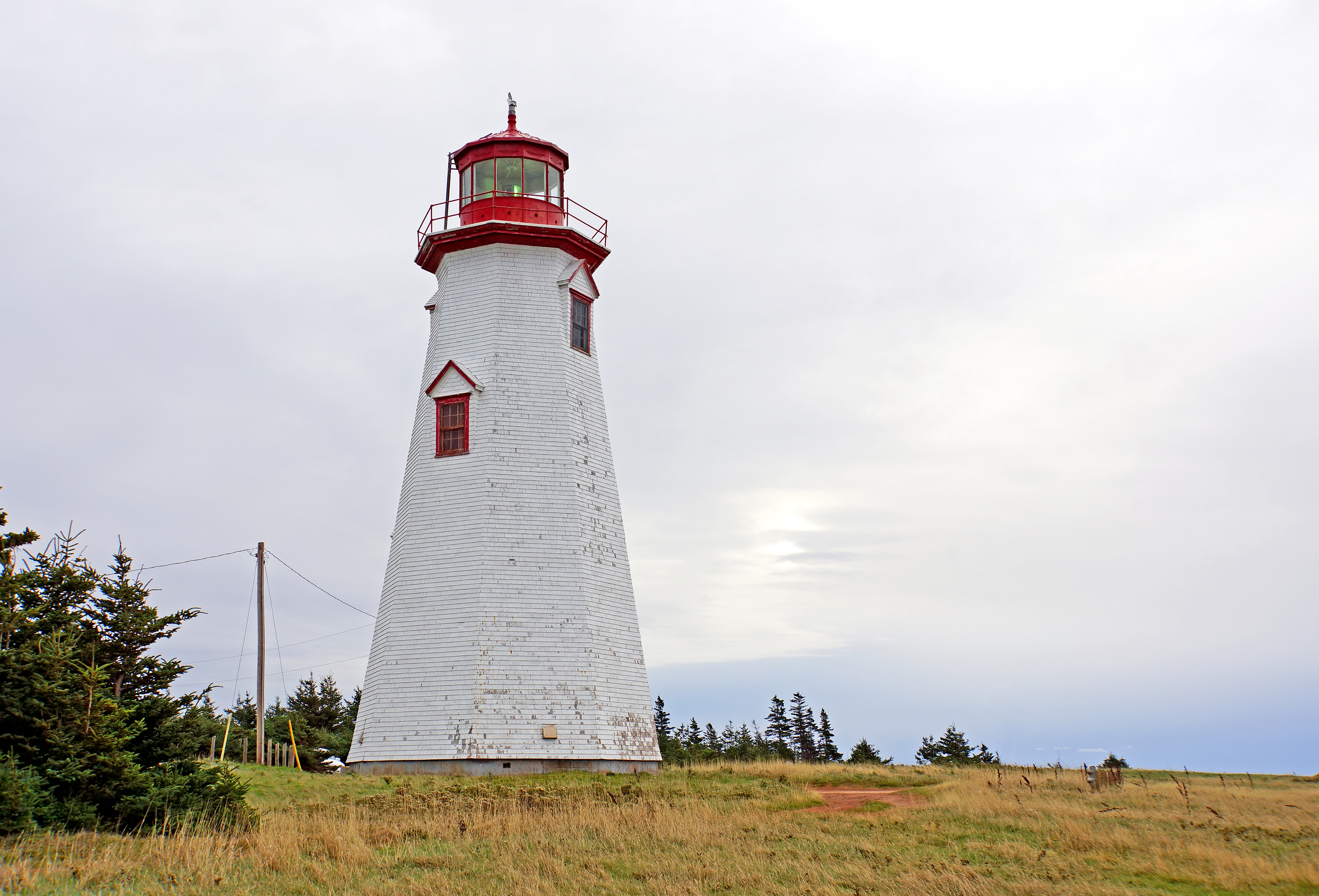
- Location: Summerside, Prince Edward Island, Canada
- Coordinates: 46°18′56.6″N 63°48′36.2″W

Tower
- Constructed: 1864
- Construction: wooden tower
- Automated: 1959
- Height: 18.3 metres (60 ft)
- Shape: octagonal tower with balcony and lantern
- Markings: white tower, red lacony and lantern
- Operator: Canadian Coast Guard
- Heritage: recognized federal heritage building of Canada, designated heritage place, heritage lighthouse

Light
- Focal height: 27 metres (89 ft)
- Range: 12 nautical miles (22 km; 14 mi)
- Characteristic: Fl (3) W 12s.

Prince Edward Island Heritage Place
- Type: Designated Heritage Place
- Designated: 2012-10-03
- Reference no.: 7716

The Seacow Head Light is a lighthouse on the south-central coast of Prince Edward Island, Canada, west of Central Bedeque. It was built in 1864. The lighthouse was relocated in 1979 to avoid erosion. The lighthouse appeared in several episodes of the television series Road to Avonlea and was home to one of the series' main characters, Gus Pike.

The name "Seacow Head" was given in reference to the walrus, formerly abundant in nearby waters, and is not connected with Steller's Sea Cow or other Sirenia.

== Keepers ==
- Malcolm MacFarlane 1865 – 1867
- Thomas P. Huestis 1867 – 1872
- James Wright 1872 – 1873
- Peter O’Ronaghan (Ranahan) 1873 – 1917
- E. O’Ronaghan 1917 – 1919
- Thomas J. Ranahan 1919 – 1946
- Walter Richards 1946 - 1959
- William Sherry 1959 - 1967

== See also ==
- List of lighthouses in Prince Edward Island
- List of lighthouses in Canada
