= Summerside Outer Range Lights =

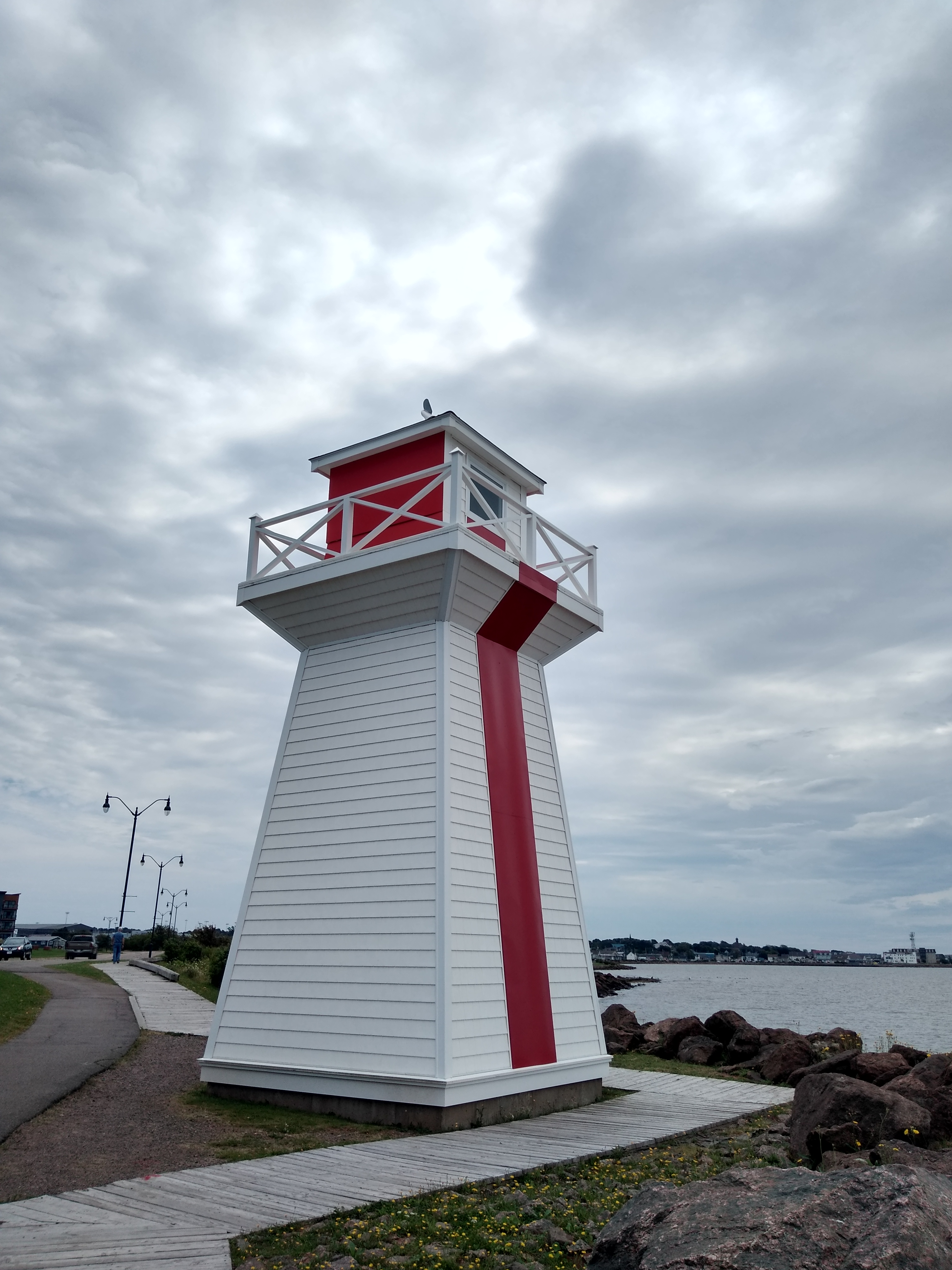
- Location: Summerside, Canada
- Coordinates: 46°23′43″N 63°48′35″W

Tower
- Constructed: 1991
- Construction: lumber
- Summerside Outer Range front light
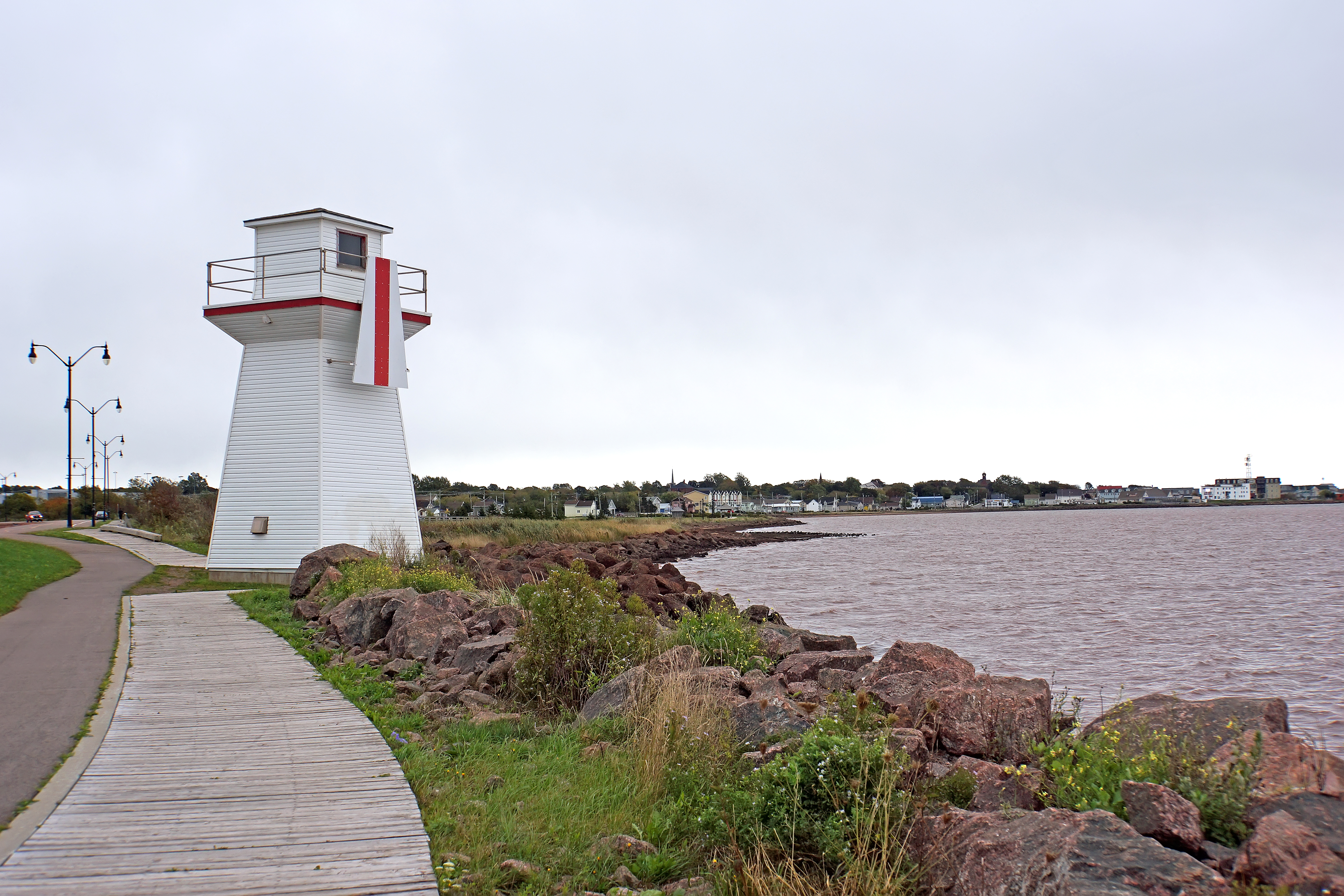
- Construction: lumber
- Height: 9 m (30 ft)
- Shape: square tower with lantern and gallery
- Markings: White (tower), red (trim)
- Operator: Canadian Coast Guard
- Focal height: 9.3 m (31 ft)
- Range: 18 nmi (33 km; 21 mi)
- Characteristic: F R
- Summerside Outer Range rear light
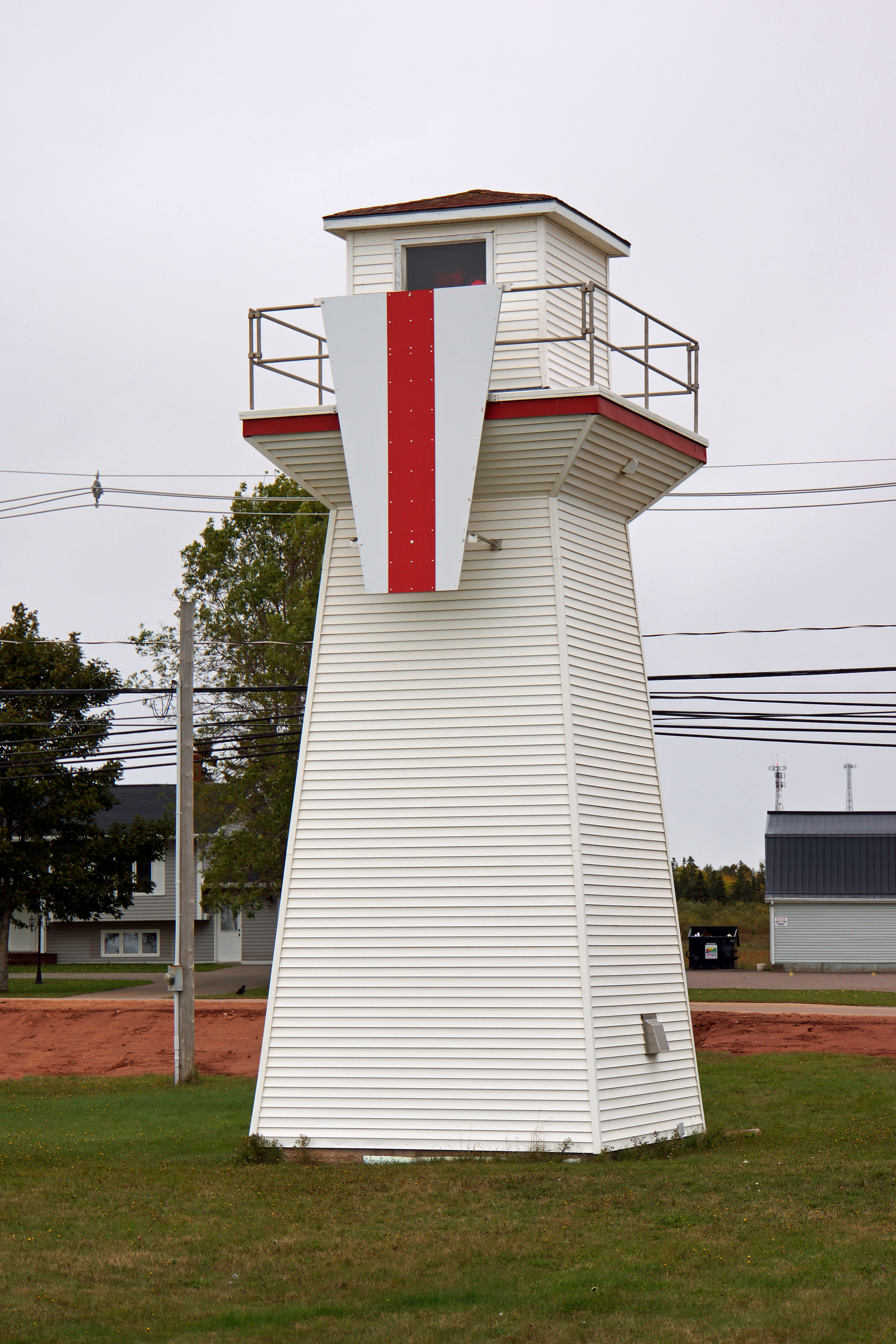
- Construction: lumber
- Height: 10 m (33 ft)
- Shape: square tower with lantern and gallery
- Operator: Canadian Coast Guard
- Focal height: 14.8 m (49 ft)
- Characteristic: F R

The Summerside Outer Range Lights are a set of range lights near Summerside, Prince Edward Island, Canada. They were built in 1991, and are still active.

== See also ==
- List of lighthouses in Prince Edward Island
- List of lighthouses in Canada
