= Wrights Range Lights =

- Location: Prince Edward Island, Victoria, Canada
- Coordinates: 46°12′N 63°30′W

Tower
- Constructed: 1894
- Wright's Front Range Light
- Constructed: 1894
- Construction: wooden tower
- Height: 3 m (9.8 ft)
- Shape: square tower, no lantern and balcony
- Markings: white tower, red vertical stripe on the range line
- Power source: solar power
- Operator: Parks Canada
- Heritage: Registered Heritage Place, heritage lighthouse
- First lit: 1903 (second)
- Focal height: 7 m (23 ft)
- Wright's Back Range Light
- Constructed: 1894
- Construction: wooden tower
- Height: 10 m (33 ft)
- Shape: square tower with balcony and lantern
- Markings: white tower, red vertical stripe on the range line and roof
- Power source: solar power
- Operator: Parks Canada
- Heritage: Registered Heritage Place, heritage lighthouse
- Focal height: 14 m (46 ft)

The Wrights Range Lights are a set of range lights on Prince Edward Island, Canada. They were built in 1894, and are still active.

== See also ==
- List of lighthouses in Prince Edward Island
- List of lighthouses in Canada
