= Blockhouse Point Light =

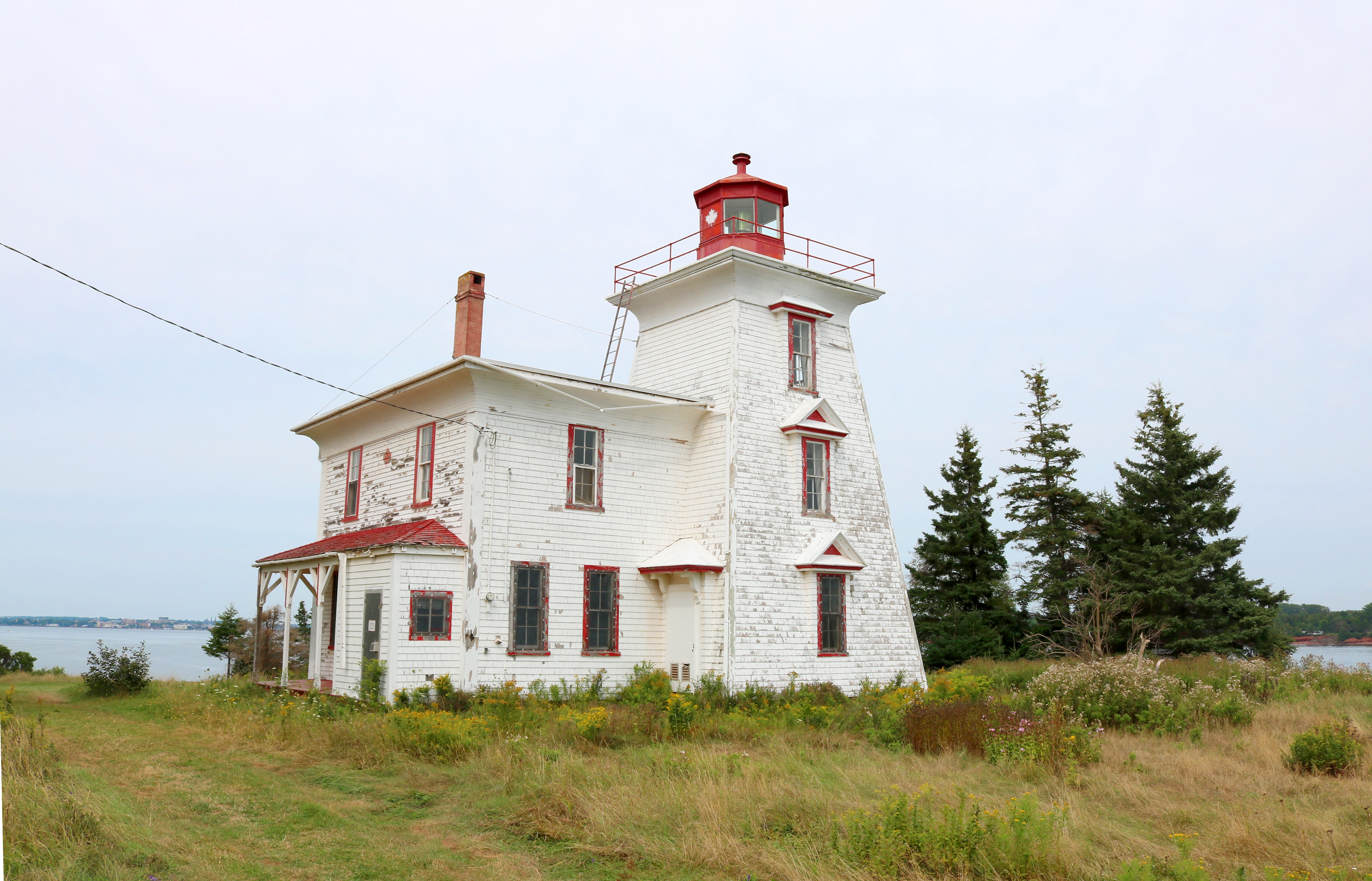
- Location: Rocky Point; Prince Edward Island; Canada
- Coordinates: 46°11′26.1″N 63°07′45.7″W

Tower
- Constructed: 1876
- Construction: wooden tower
- Automated: 1962
- Height: 12.8 metres (42 ft)
- Shape: square pyramidal tower with lantern and gallery, with attached keeper's house
- Markings: white with red trim, red lantern and gallery
- Operator: Canadian Coast Guard
- Heritage: CRHP 4320-20/B4

Light
- Focal height: 18.3 metres (60 ft)
- Range: 12 nautical miles (22 km; 14 mi)
- Characteristic: Occ. W

The Blockhouse Point Light is a lighthouse at Rocky Point, Prince Edward Island, Canada, on the western shore of Charlottetown Harbour. The present lighthouse, constructed in 1876, replaced older lighthouses at the site which are believed to have been constructed as early as 1846 to serve as a light for the harbour. The lighthouse is active as of 2019, and consists of an 18.3 m (60 ft) wooden pyramidal tower, attached to a two-storey keeper's house. The lighthouse ownership was transferred to Abegweit First Nation in Spring 2024. As of July 2026, it is under renovation with large “Private Property - No Trespassing” signs all around the lighthouse.

== See also ==
- List of lighthouses in Prince Edward Island
