= Leards Range Lights =

Leards Range Rear Light
- Location: Prince Edward Island; Canada
- Coordinates: 46°13′17″N 63°29′34″W

Tower
- Constructed: 1879
- Construction: wooden tower
- Height: 13.7 metres (45 ft)
- Shape: square tower with lantern and gallery
- Markings: white tower with red vertical stripe on the range, red lantern
- Operator: Canadian Coast Guard

Light
- Deactivated: 2011
- Focal height: 30.8 metres (101 ft)
- Characteristic: F G

The Leards Range Lights are a set of two range lights (rear and front) on Prince Edward Island, Canada. They were built in 1879, and are still active.

== See also ==
- List of lighthouses in Prince Edward Island
- List of lighthouses in Canada
