= Cape Tryon Light =

Lighthouse on Prince Edward Island, Canada

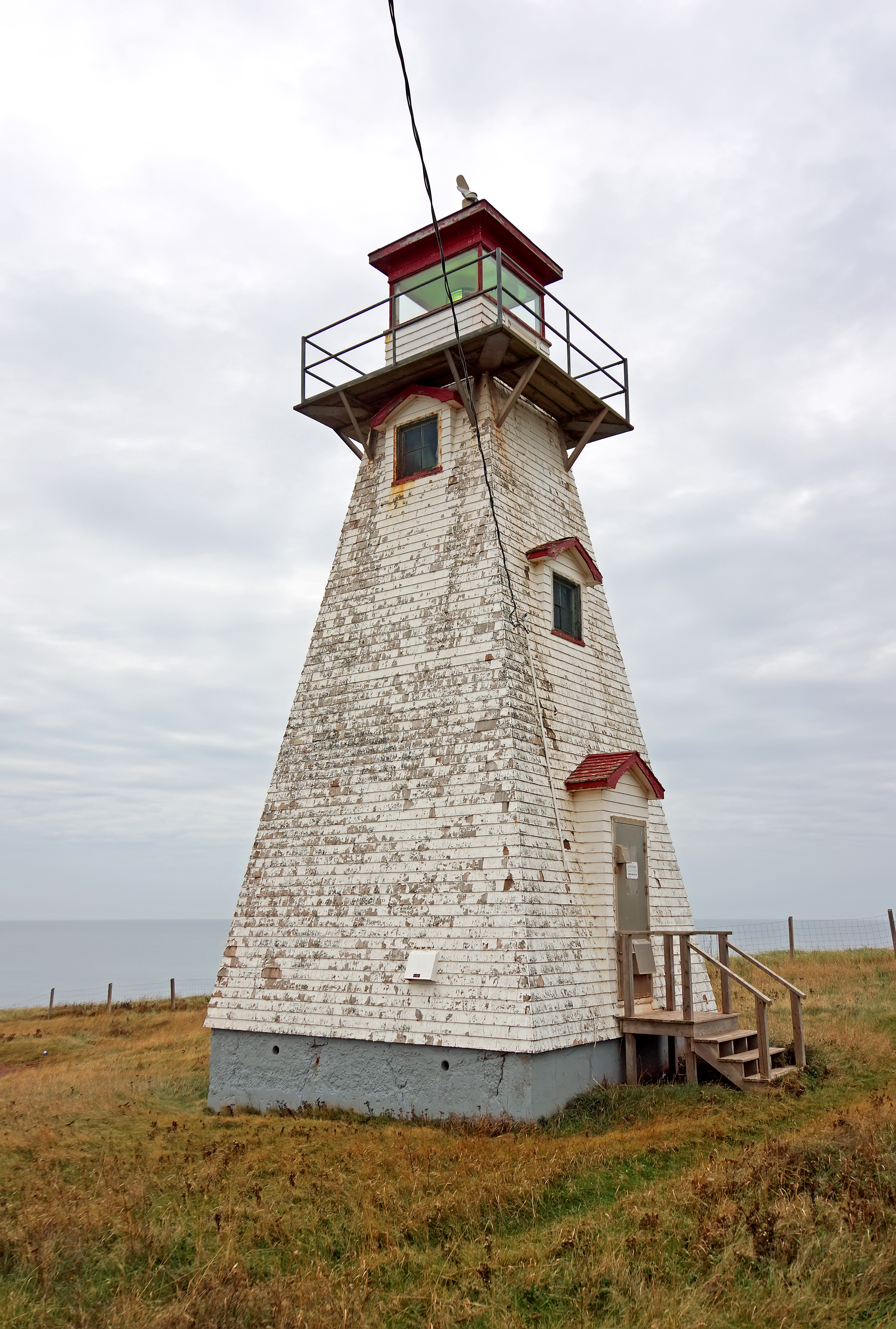
- Location: Cape Tryon; Prince Edward Island; Canada
- Coordinates: 46°32′02.5″N 63°30′21.9″W

Tower
- Constructed: 1905 (first)
- Construction: wooden tower (both)
- Height: 12.4 metres (41 ft)
- Shape: square pyramidal tower (current)
- Markings: white tower, red lantern
- Operator: Canadian Coast Guard
- Heritage: heritage lighthouse, Registered Heritage Place

Light
- First lit: 1965 (current)
- Deactivated: 1965
- Focal height: 33.4 metres (110 ft)
- Range: 8 nautical miles (15 km; 9.2 mi)
- Characteristic: L Fl W 4s.

The Cape Tryon Light is a lighthouse on the western north coast of Prince Edward Island, Canada, located on Cousins Shore about 4 km (2.5 mi) west of the cape. The station was built in 1905 and it characterised as a white building with red trim; with the lantern painted red.

The original Cape Tryon lighthouse was deactivated in 1969. A second lighthouse was built on Cape Tryon itself, opened in 1969, and is still active. It is located a few kilometres north of the village of French River.

== See also ==
- List of lighthouses in Prince Edward Island
- List of lighthouses in Canada
