= Wood Islands Lighthouse =

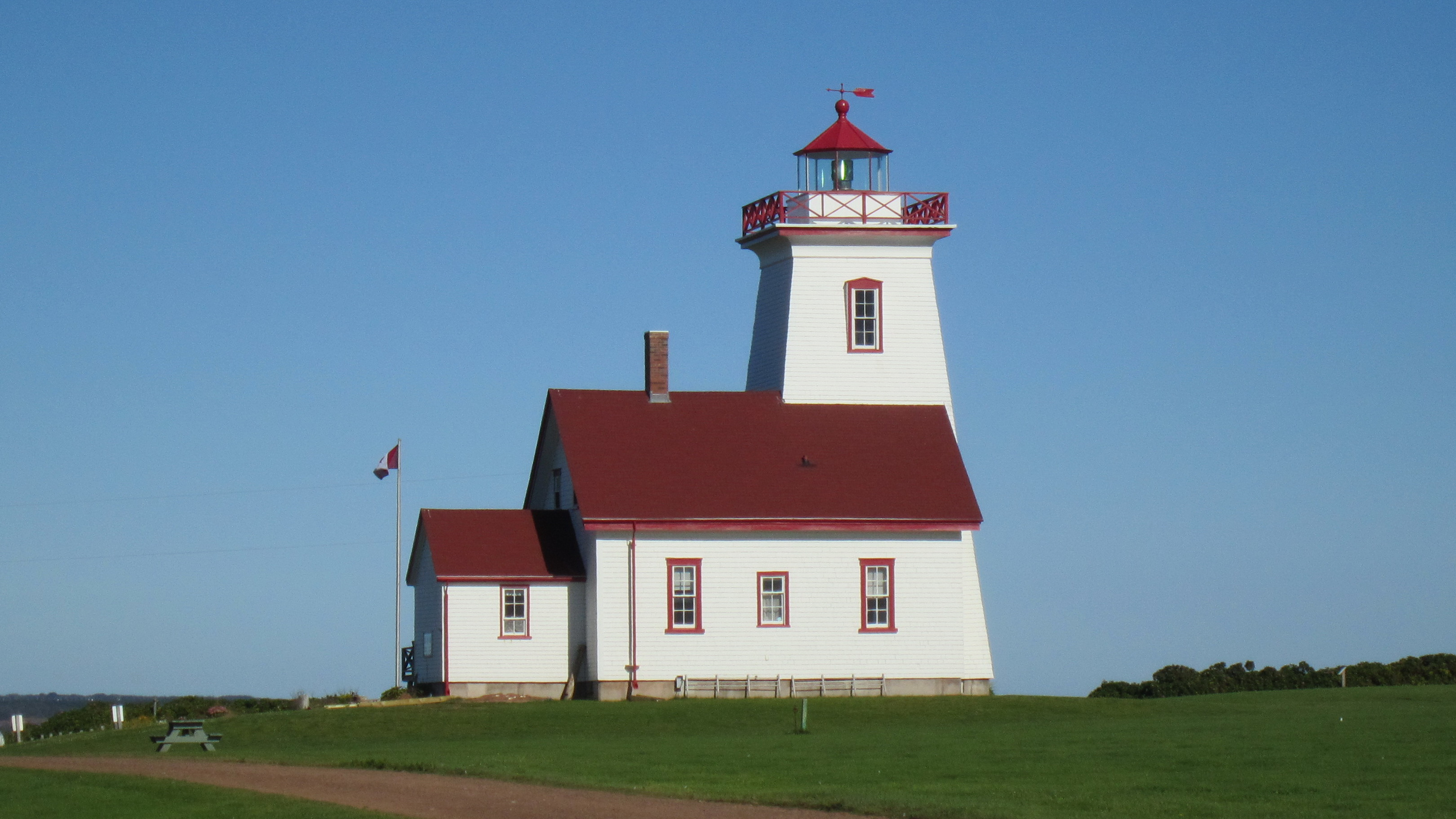
- Wood Islands Lighthouse
- Location: Wood Islands; Prince Edward Island; Canada
- Coordinates: 45°57′00″N 62°44′46″W

Tower
- Constructed: 1875 for 1876
- Foundation: stone basement
- Construction: Wooded Tower
- Automated: Electrification 1958
- Height: 16.5 metres (54 ft)
- Shape: square tower with balcony and lantern
- Markings: white tower, red lantern and balcony
- Operator: Wood Islands and Area Development Corporation
- Heritage: designated heritage place, recognized federal heritage building of Canada
- Fog signal: 1941 - 1998

Light
- First lit: 1876
- Deactivated: Destaffing 1990
- Focal height: 21.8 metres (72 ft)
- Range: Nominal 12 nautical miles
- Characteristic: Iso W 10s.

The Wood Islands Lighthouse is a historic lighthouse built by Donald MacMillan situated on the southeastern shore of Prince Edward Island, located in the community of Wood Islands. The lighthouse is a well-preserved three storey tower with an adjoining 1 1/2-storey keeper's residence. The white shingled tower is topped by a red iron lantern, which is enclosed by a white railing on the observation deck. The red roof of the dwelling provides a striking contrast to the white shingled exterior of the dwelling.

It was one of the last three lights on Prince Edward Island to be fully automated, and the last where the keeper and his family lived. The lighthouse and residence are now open as a museum, with exhibits about the history of lighthouses, ferry service and fishing on the island, and includes a 1950s period kitchen and keeper's quarters.

== History ==
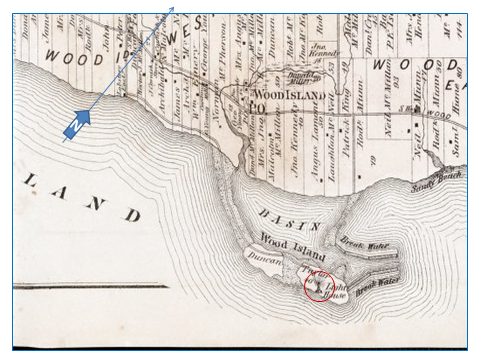
Wood Island Lighthouse: Meacham 1880

During its session of 1874, the Canadian Parliament appropriated $6,000 for the construction of a lighthouse at Wood Island, on a site purchased from Thomas McMahon in June 1875, being finished in the autumn of 1876, it was put into operation on 1 November 1876. Archibald MacKay of New Brunswick first signed the contract to construct the lighthouse, making little progress into 1875 he abandoned his efforts and Donald MacMillan, a local master carpenter, was hired to complete the lighthouse.

Prior to the construction of the federal ferry wharf, that began in 1937; the light served as a navigation aid to marine traffic in the Northumberland Strait and fishing boats in and around Wood Islands Harbour. From 1940, Northumberland Ferries Limited began to use this coastal light for their seasonal ferry service operating between Wood Islands and Caribou, Nova Scotia. In 1950, the dwelling attached to the tower was renovated with a new kitchen built to accommodate the light keeper, and in 1958, the dwelling and lighthouse were wired for electricity. The light then operated on a 1000 watt airway beacon lamp and changed from a fixed light to a revolving flashing light, which is still in use.

In 1984 light tower was renovated when a generator and fog alarm equipment were installed, windows were changed to accommodate ventilators, a halon fire alarm system was installed and a balcony was built in 1984 to accommodate the fog alarm equipment. After 133 years on one spot, shoreline erosion forced the moving of the lighthouse, from just a few metres above the Northumberland Straight, back 70 metres back to more solid ground, on March 10, 2009. The move was made in winter so the ground would be solid enough to support the structure for the move.

== Keepers ==
Early light-keepers had a significant challenge in access, to their home and the light, as it could only be approached through dense woods and along the beach from well west of the lighthouse. The light was initially accessed from a track running south down now Pioneer Cemetery Road, to a land spit stretching south from 'Wood Island', over a sand bar, to its southeast island corner location. With time, this track was lost and a new land was access gained running south from now McLeod Road. The southeast island came to be attached to shore with changes in the harbour design, with the construction of the Wood Islands ferry terminal and its ferry berthing docks.

Keeper	Period of Service	Notes / Comments
James MacMillan	1876 – 1887	Assisted by Son Neil
William D. MacMillan	1887 – 1898	Dismissed for Political Activity
John Roderick W. McKay	1898 – 1912	Lived in Wood Islands
Levi Morrow	1912 – 1924	Lived in Iris, PE
Thomas Art Smith	1924 – 1949	From New Glasgow, NS
George Stewart	1949 – 1972	WW2 Medal of Bravery 1945
Manson E. Murchison	1972 – 1974	WW2 Veteran: Italy / France
Bernard Beaton	1975 – 1976	From Cape Breton, NS
Leon Patton	1977 – 1990	From Cape Breton, NS

Wood Islands Harbour Range Lights
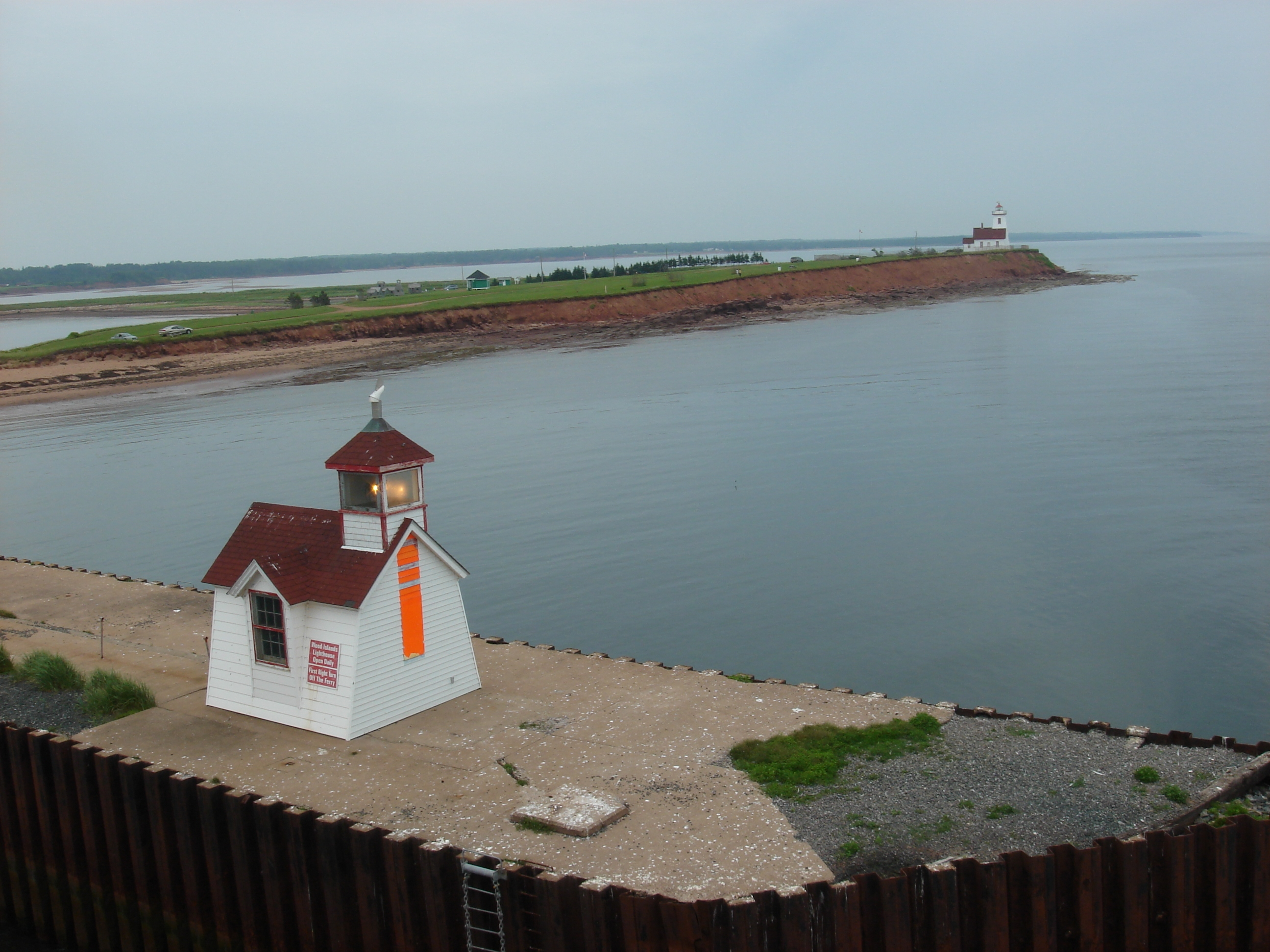
- Wood Islands Front Range
- Location: Wood Islands, PE
- Coordinates: 45°57′00″N 62°44′44″W (rear); 45°57′01″N 62°44′46″W (front)

Tower
- Constructed: 1902
- Construction: wooden tower
- Automated: 1990
- Height: 16.5 m (54 ft)
- Shape: square tower with lantern and gallery
- Markings: white tower, red vertical stripe on the range line
- Operator: Wood Islands Lighthouse
- Heritage: designated heritage place, recognized federal heritage building of Canada

Light
- Deactivated: 2007
- Focal height: 21.8 m (72 ft)
- Range: 12 nmi (22 km; 14 mi)
- Characteristic: Iso W 10s

== Harbour Range Lights ==
The Wood Islands Harbour Range Lights are a set of range lights at Wood Islands, Prince Edward Island, Canada, are now located by the Wood Islands Lighthouse, it built in 1876. The Wood Islands Harbour Front Range and Wood Islands Harbour Rear Range were built in September 1902, they were relocated to the southern pier at the harbour entrance in 1940, and no longer active.

Designed by the Department of Marine, and built by M. Walsh, the Front Range Light began as a square, wooden, tapered light covered with metal siding, standing 4.5 m (18.4 feet) in height from base to vane. It later gained its attached shed and a gable roof, over its door. The larger Back Range Light, of the same builder and designer, has retained its design with its most outstanding feature being the lantern deck's wooden railing and supporting wooden brackets.

Range (leading) lights, placed in line, are used as inbound aids to navigation, for a tight entry into dangerous narrow and/or shallow channels. Though they may be any two objects in line, typically they are distinctive lights operating as a pair, the front range beacon being lower than the rear, to form a range (leading line), when brought into transit. The one nearest to the observer is the front light and the one farthest from the observer is the rear light. When both ranges are aligned the vessel is on a correct bearing. If a ship veers too far to the right, the rear range appears to drift to the right of the front range; if the error is to the left, the rear drifts left.

Designation Source	Front Range Number	Rear Range Number
Admiralty	H0964	H0964.1
Canada F&O	CCG 973	CCG 974
NGA	8168	8172
ARLHS	CAN-536	CAN-537
Standing Height	6 m / 20 ft	10 m / 33 ft

== See also ==
- List of lighthouses in Prince Edward Island
- List of lighthouses in Canada
