= Murray Harbour Range Lights =

- Location: Beach Point; Prince Edward Island; Canada
- Coordinates: 46°01′N 62°29′W

Tower
- Constructed: 1869
- Murray Harbour Back Range Light
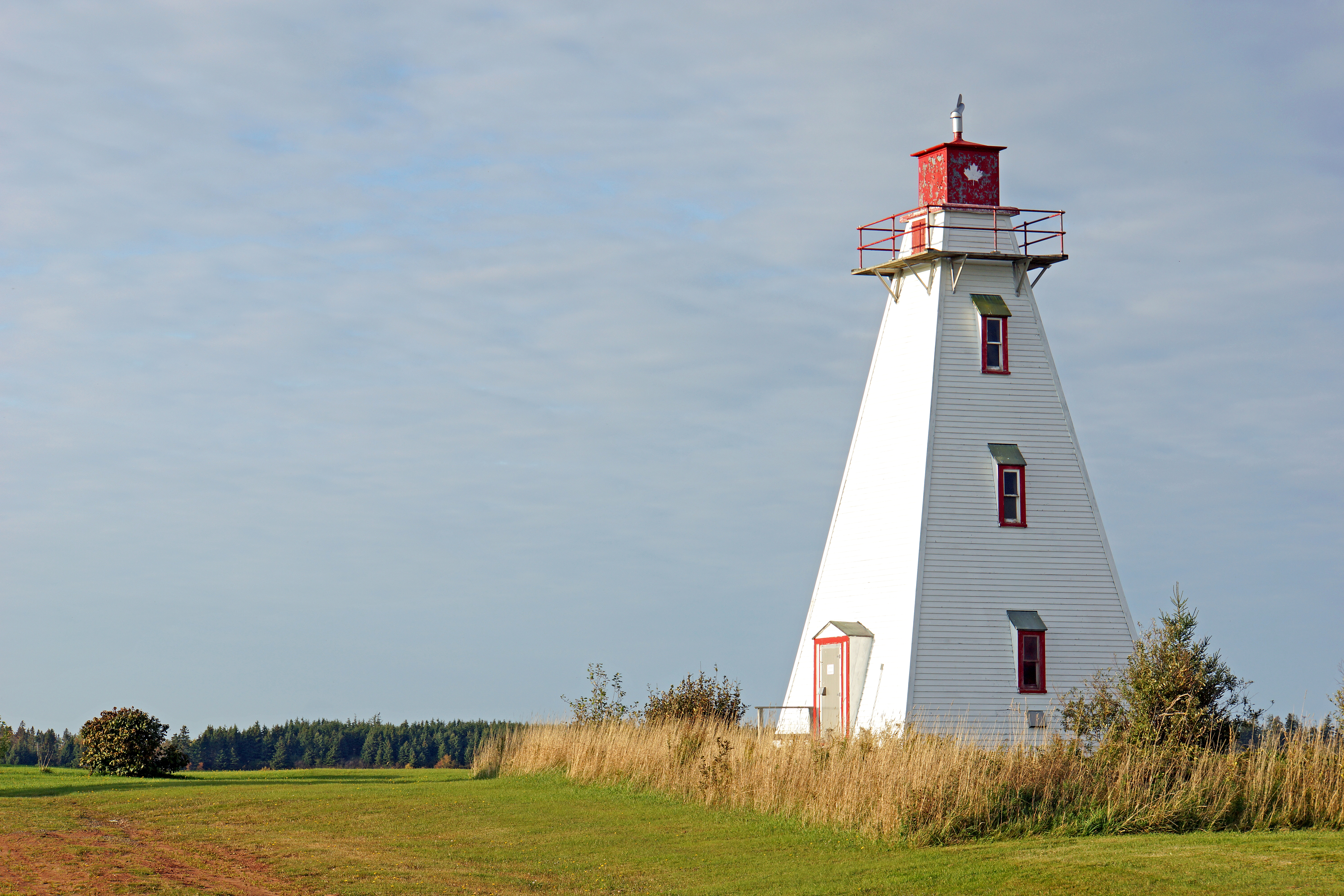
- Constructed: 1869 (first)
- Construction: wooden tower
- Height: 13 m (43 ft)
- Shape: square tower with balcony and lantern
- Markings: white tower with a red vertical range line, red lantern
- Operator: Canadian Coast Guard
- Heritage: Registered Heritage Place
- First lit: 1879 (current)
- Focal height: 17 m (56 ft)
- Range: 10 nmi (19 km; 12 mi)
- Characteristic: F R
- Murray Harbour Front Range Light
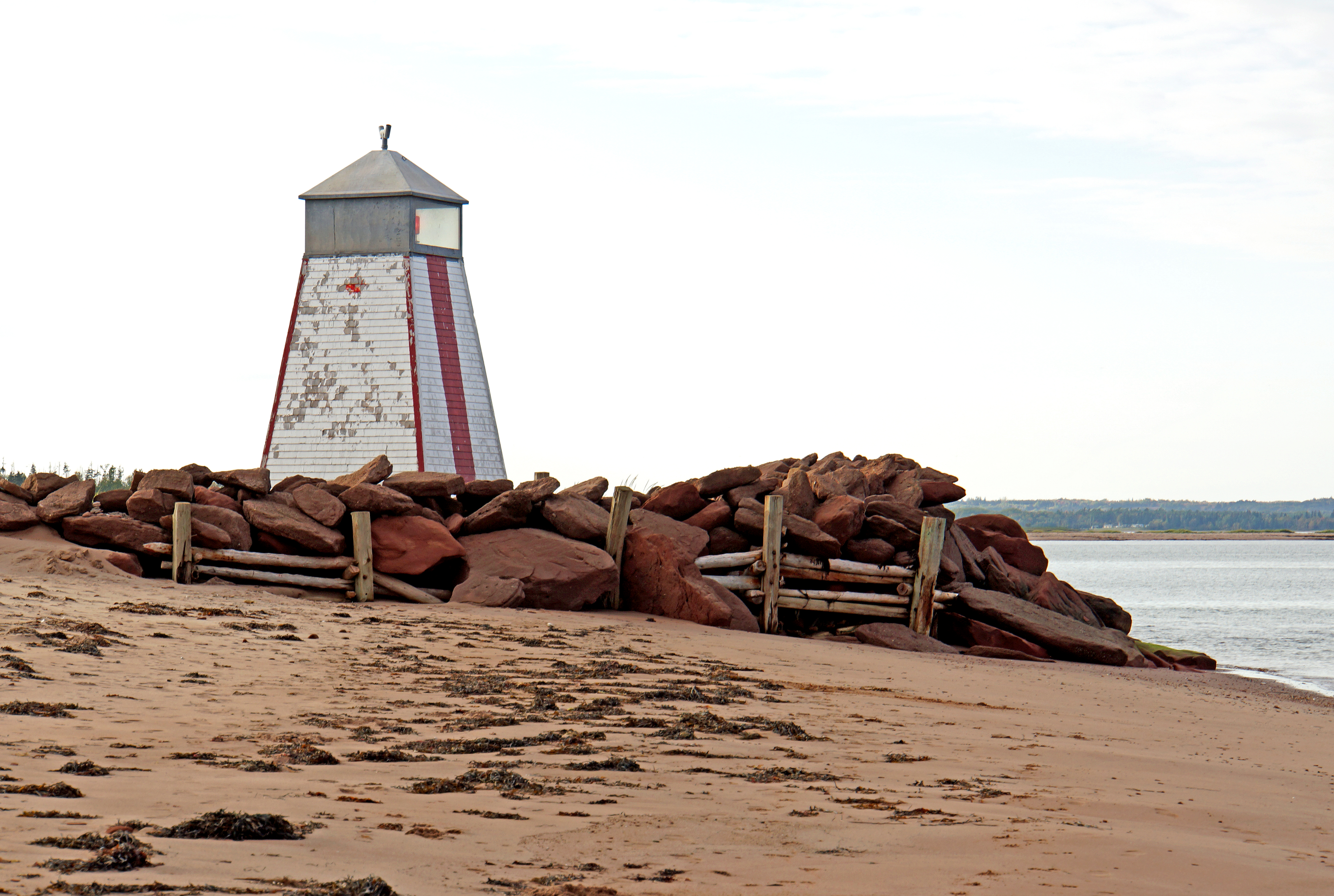
- Constructed: 1869 (first)
- Construction: wooden tower
- Height: 7 m (23 ft)
- Shape: square tower with lantern
- Markings: white tower with a red vertical range line, red trim
- Operator: Canadian Coast Guard
- Heritage: Registered Heritage Place
- First lit: 1879 (current)
- Deactivated: 2010-2011
- Focal height: 6 m (20 ft)
- Range: 10 nmi (19 km; 12 mi)
- Characteristic: F R

The Murray Harbour Range Lights are a set of range lights near Murray Harbour, Prince Edward Island, Canada. They were built in 1879, and are still active.

== See also ==
- List of lighthouses in Prince Edward Island
