= Miminegash Range Lights =

- Location: Miminegash; Prince Edward Island; Canada
- Coordinates: 46.880203°N 64.235049°W

Tower
- Constructed: 1886 (first)
- Construction: steel skeletal mast
- Height: 4 metres (13 ft)
- Shape: square prism skeletal mast with beacon
- Markings: white trapezoidal daymark with a red vertical stripe
- Operator: Canadian Coast Guard

Light
- Deactivated: 1972 (first)
- Focal height: 6 metres (20 ft)
- Range: 8 nautical miles (15 km; 9.2 mi)
- Characteristic: F R

The Miminegash Range Lights were a set of range lights on Prince Edward Island, Canada. They were built in 1886, and deactivated in 1972; only the rear tower has survived.

== See also ==
- List of lighthouses in Prince Edward Island
