= Northport Range Lights =

- Location: Northport, Canada
- Coordinates: 46°47′39″N 64°03′45″W

Tower
- Constructed: 1897
- Northport Rear Range Lighthouse
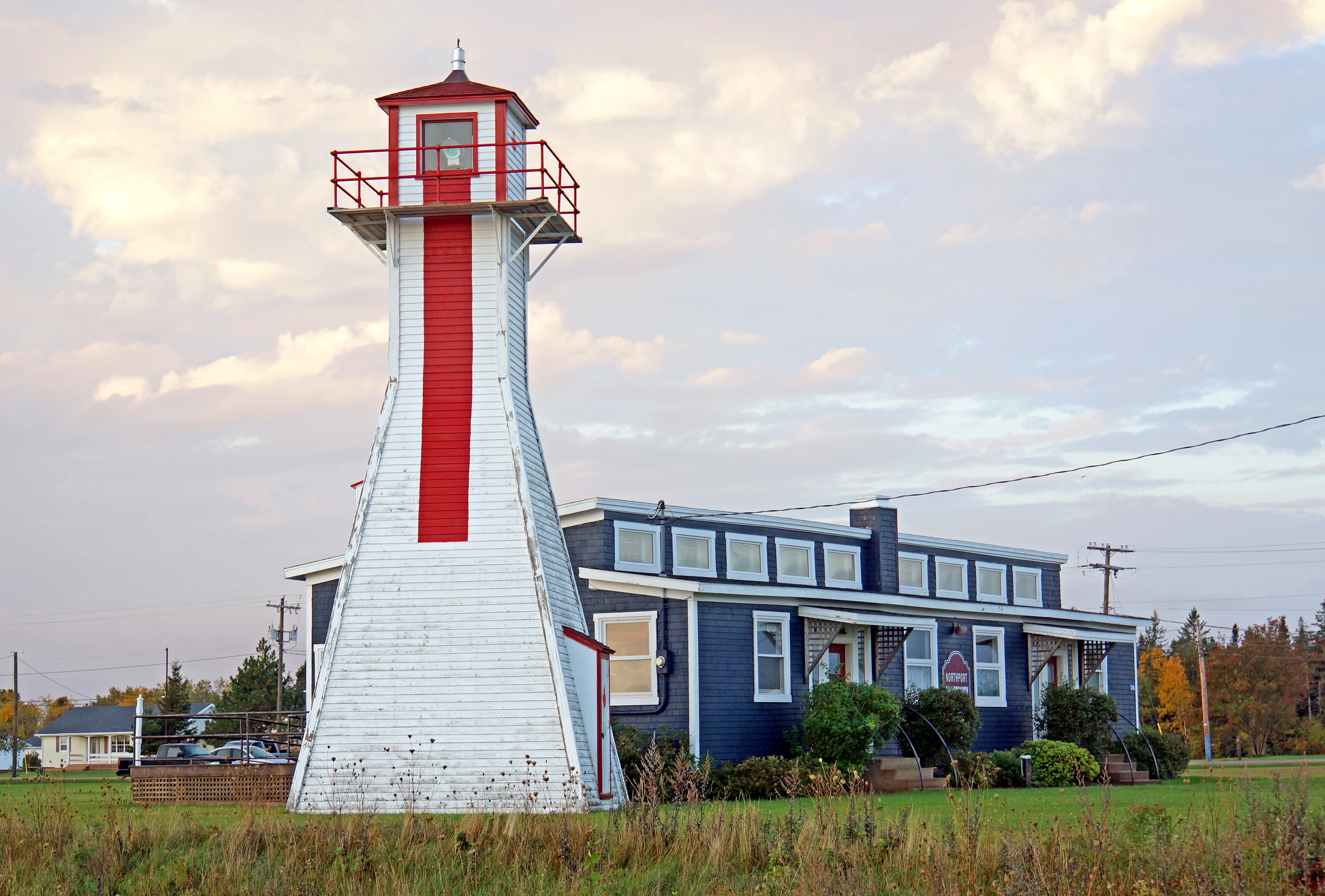
- Constructed: 1897
- Height: 12 m (39 ft)
- Markings: White (tower), red (trim), red (lantern)
- Operator: Canadian Coast Guard
- Heritage: heritage lighthouse, Registered Heritage Place
- First lit: 1962
- Focal height: 13 m (43 ft)
- Range: 15 nmi (28 km; 17 mi)
- Characteristic: Iso G 4s
- Northport Front Range Light
- Markings: Daymark (rectangle, white)
- Operator: Canadian Coast Guard
- Focal height: 9.2 m (30 ft)
- Range: 15 nmi (28 km; 17 mi)
- Characteristic: Iso G 1s
- Former Northport Back Range Light
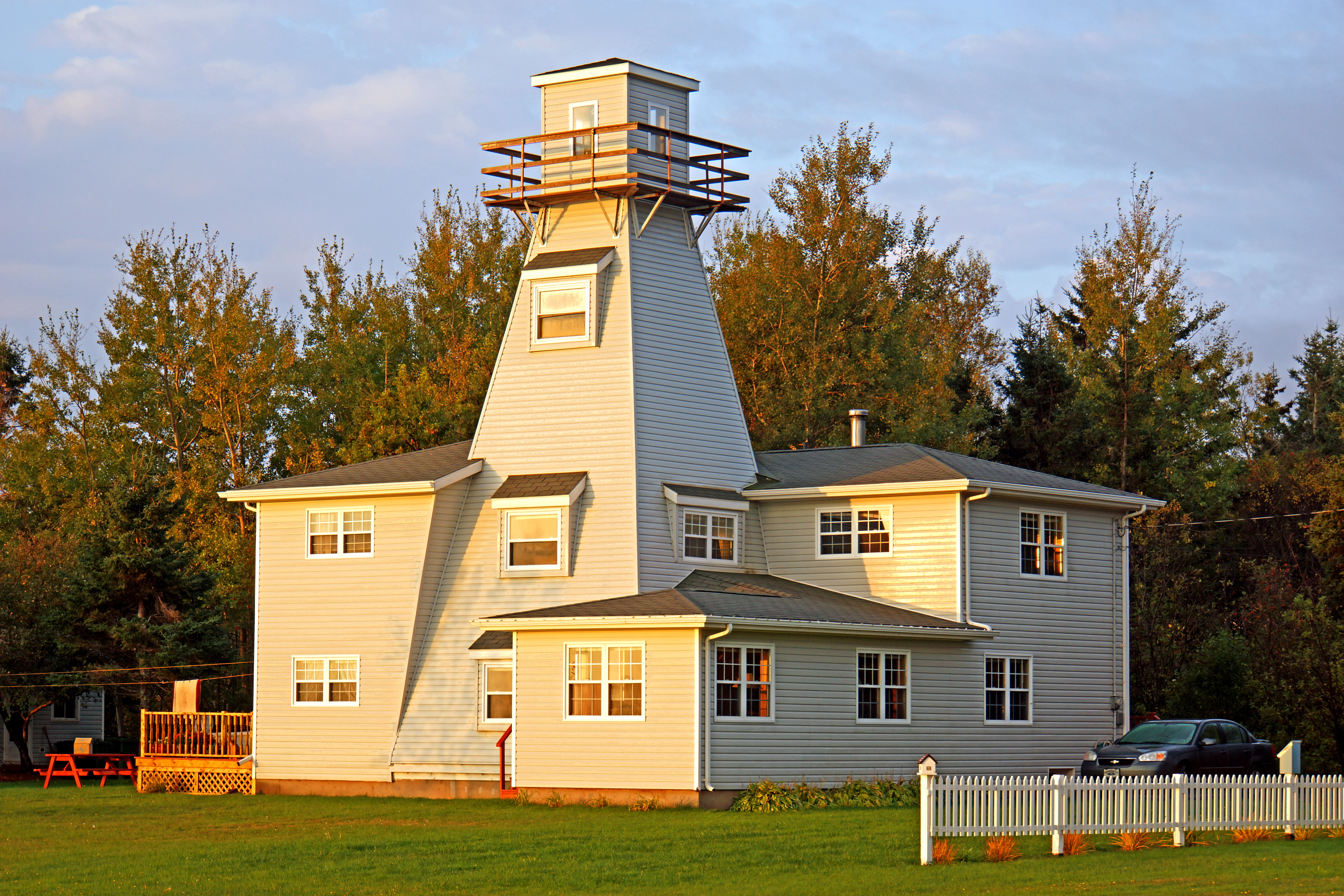
- Constructed: 1897
- Construction: structural wood
- Height: 13 m (43 ft)
- Shape: square pyramid
- Markings: White
- Deactivated: 1962

The Northport Range Lights were a set of range lights on Prince Edward Island, Canada. They were built in 1885, and the rear light was deactivated around 1970; the front light is still active as the rear light of the new range.

== See also ==
- List of lighthouses in Prince Edward Island
- List of lighthouses in Canada
