= Warren Cove Range Lights =

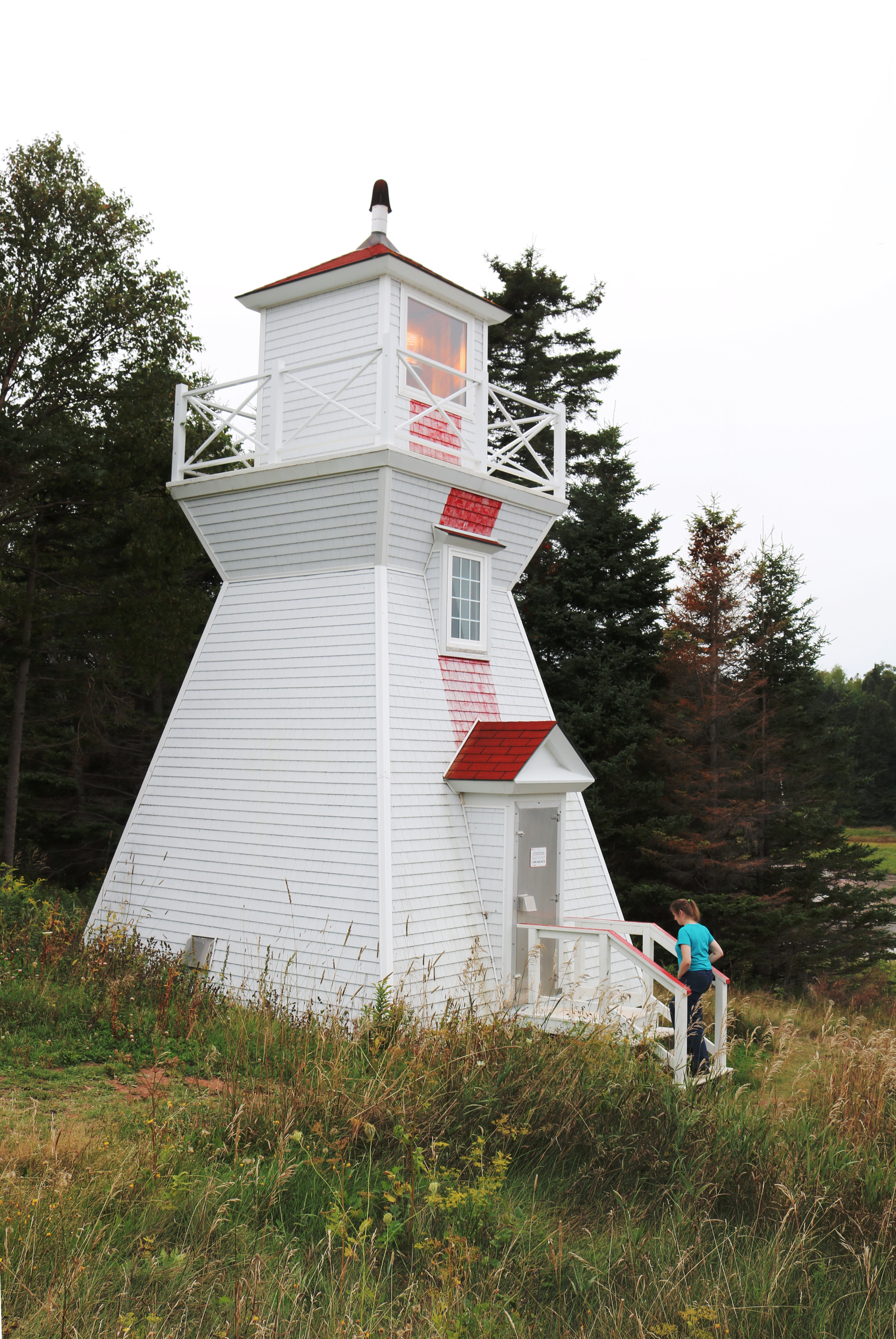
- Location: Prince Edward Island, Canada
- Coordinates: 46°12′N 63°08′W

Tower
- Constructed: 1907
- Warren Cove Range Front Lighthouse
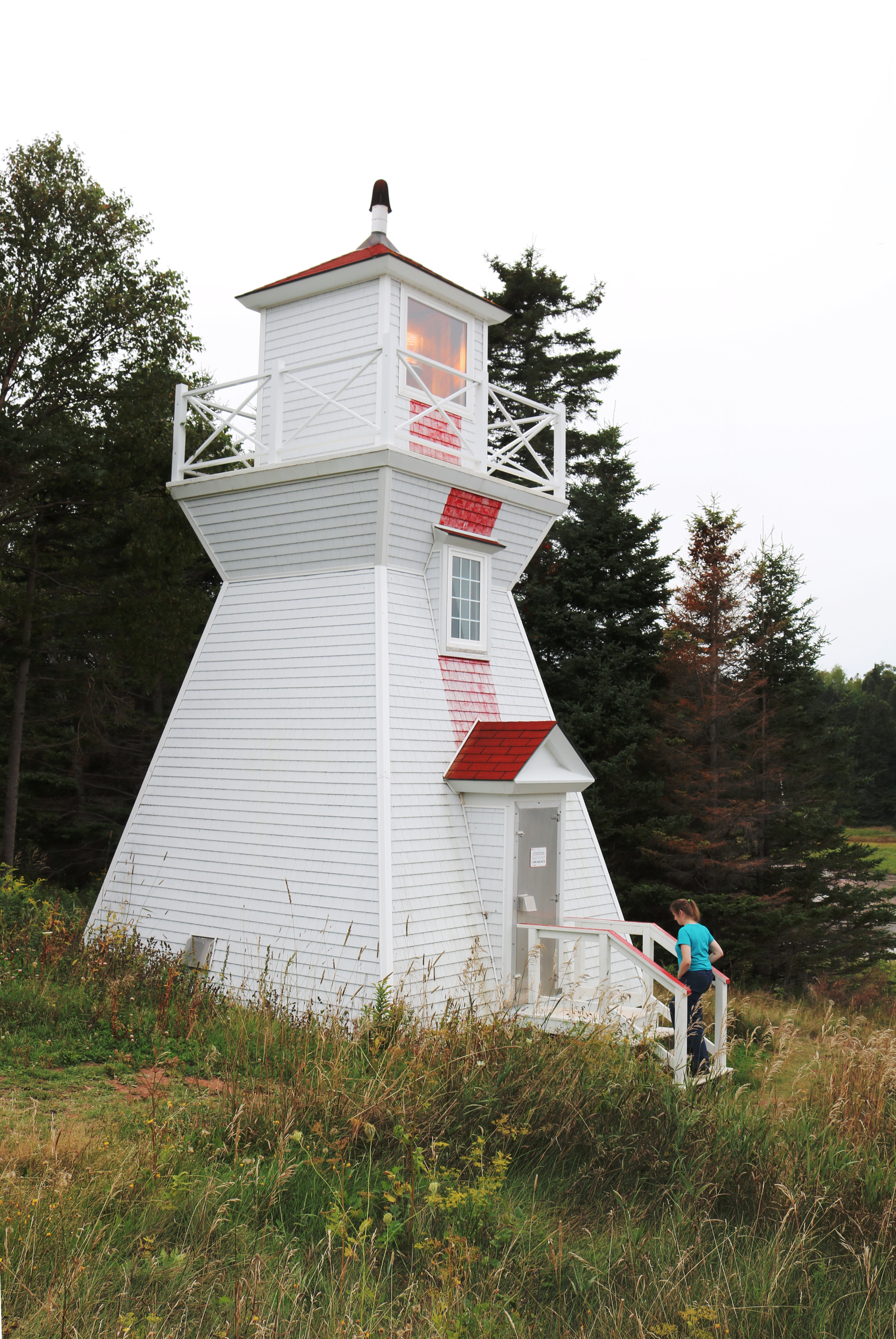
- Constructed: 1907
- Construction: wooden tower
- Height: 11 m (36 ft)
- Shape: square tower with gallery and square lantern
- Markings: white tower, red trim and vertical stripe on the range
- Operator: Parks Canada
- Focal height: 17 m (56 ft)
- Range: 12 nmi (22 km; 14 mi)
- Characteristic: F Y
- Warren Cove Range Rear Lighthouse
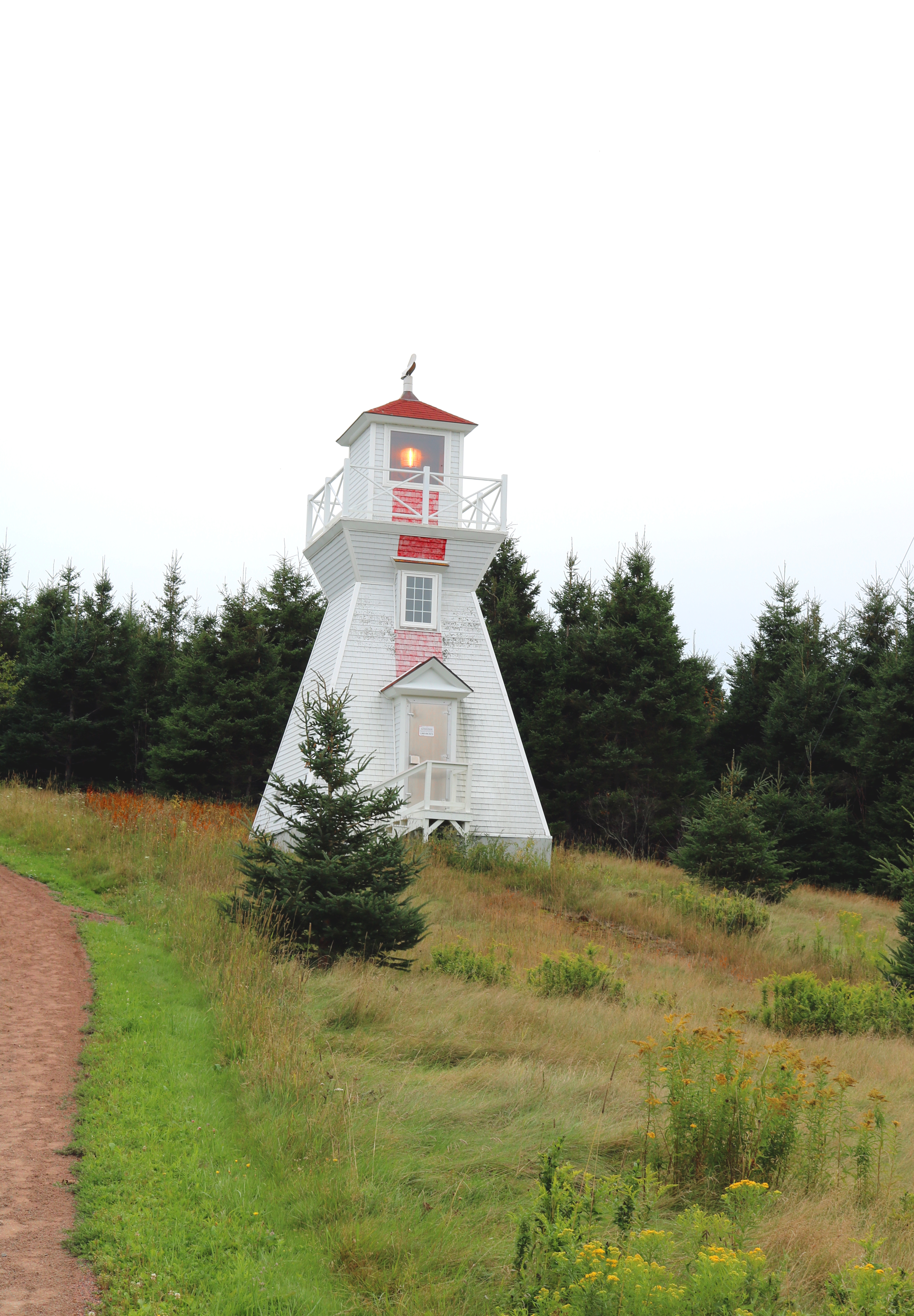
- Constructed: 1907
- Construction: wooden tower
- Height: 7.7 m (25 ft)
- Shape: square tower with gallery and square lantern
- Markings: white tower, red trim and vertical stripe on the range
- Operator: Parks Canada
- Focal height: 23 m (75 ft), 21.4 m (70 ft)
- Range: 12 nmi (22 km; 14 mi)
- Characteristic: F Y

The Warren Cove Range Lights are a set of range lights on Rocky Point, Prince Edward Island, Canada. They were built in 1907, and are still active.

== Keepers ==
- Alexander S. McNeil 1907–1912
- C. E. H. Newson 1912–1921
- J. L. Doiron 1921–1923
- James H. Feehan 1923–1931
- Herbert Grovette 1931–1936
- Maurice F. White 1936–1956
- Harold MacKinnon 1956–1957

== See also ==
- List of lighthouses in Prince Edward Island
- List of lighthouses in Canada
