= North Rustico Harbour Light =

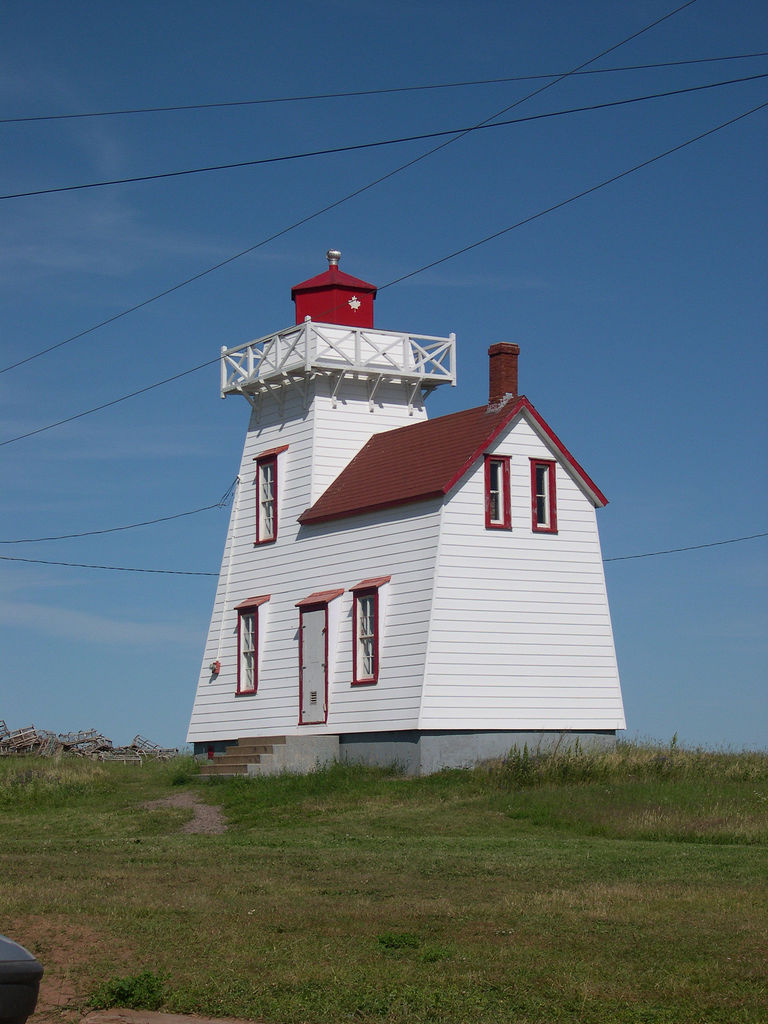
- Location: North Rustico; Prince Edward Island; Canada
- Coordinates: 46°27′19″N 63°17′31″W

Tower
- Constructed: 1876 (first)
- Construction: wooden tower
- Automated: 1960
- Height: 10 metres (33 ft)
- Shape: square tower with lantern and gallery attached to keeper's house
- Operator: North Rustico Lighthouse
- Heritage: recognized federal heritage building of Canada, designated heritage place

Light
- First lit: 1899 (current)
- Focal height: 12.5 metres (41 ft)
- Range: 13 nmi (24 km; 15 mi)
- Characteristic: Iso Y 10s.

The North Rustico Harbour Light is an active lighthouse on the central north coast of Prince Edward Island, Canada. The station was established in 1876 and the lighthouse itself was built in 1899. It is still active, and has a focal plane of 12.5 m (41 ft); and a yellow light, 5 seconds on, 5 seconds off. The tower itself is 10 m (34 ft) high with a square pyramidal wood tower with lantern and gallery.

== See also ==
- List of lighthouses in Prince Edward Island
- List of lighthouses in Canada
