= Brighton Beach Range Lights =

- Location: Prince Edward Island, Canada
- Coordinates: 46°13′50″N 63°08′51″W

Tower
- Constructed: 1890
- Brighton Beach Range Front Light
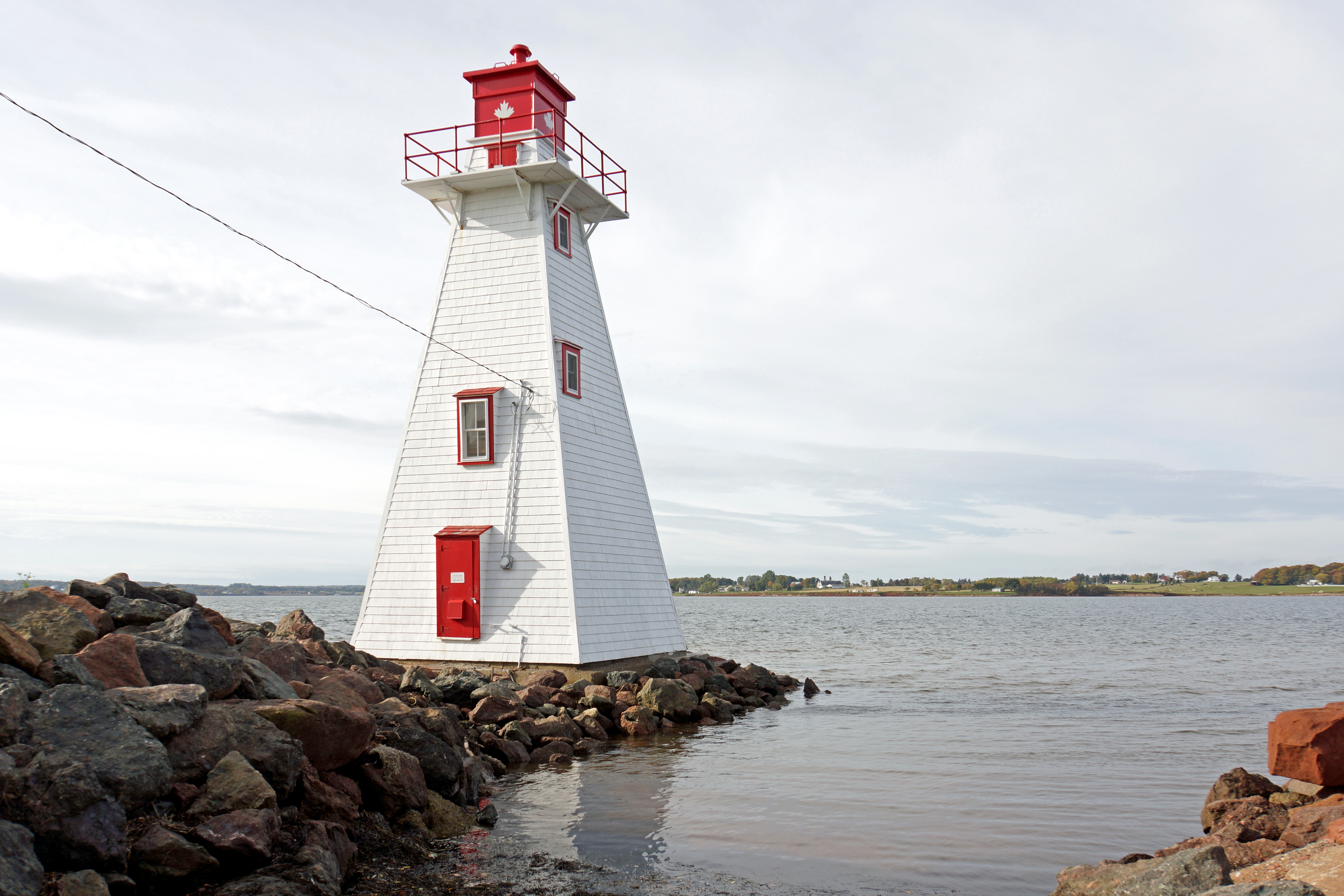
- Construction: wooden tower
- Height: 11 m (36 ft)
- Shape: square pyramidal tower with balcony and lantern
- Markings: white tower with a red vertical stripe on the range line, red lantern and trim
- Operator: Charlottetown City Council
- Heritage: heritage lighthouse
- First lit: 1892
- Focal height: 12.4 m (41 ft)
- Range: 19 nmi (35 km; 22 mi)
- Characteristic: F Y
- Brighton Beach Range Rear Light
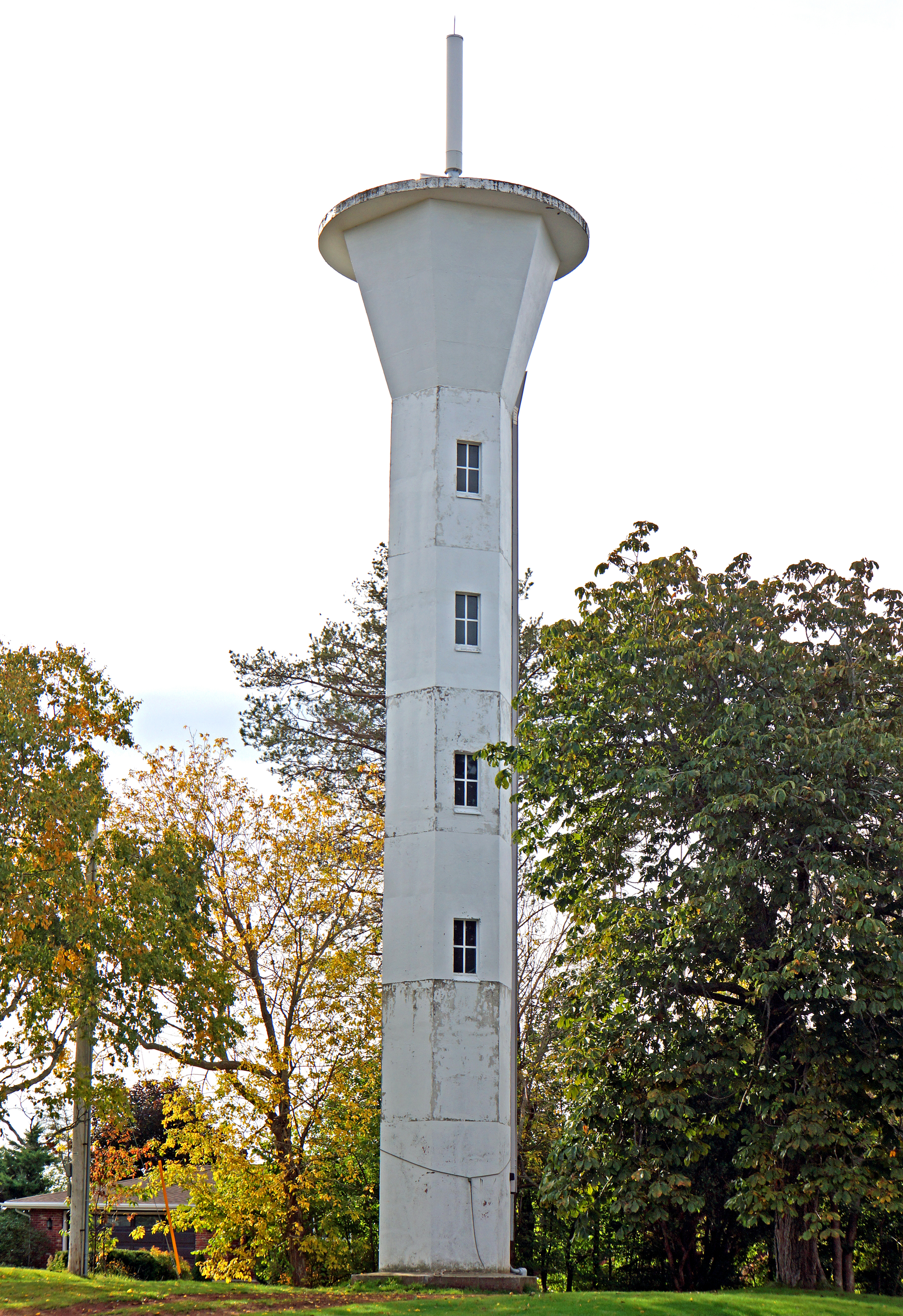
- Constructed: 1890 (first)
- Construction: concrete tower (current) wooden tower (first)
- Height: 18.4 metres (60 ft) (current); 12.8 metres (42 ft) (first)
- Shape: hexagonal tower flaring outward (current) square pyramidal tower with balcony and lantern (first)
- Markings: white tower with a red vertical stripe on the range line
- Operator: Charlottetown City Council
- First lit: 1969 (current)
- Focal height: 26.5 metres (87 ft) (current)
- Range: 19 nautical miles (35 km; 22 mi)
- Characteristic: F Y

The Brighton Beach Range Lights are a set of range lights in Charlottetown, Prince Edward Island, Canada. They were built in 1890, and are still active.

== See also ==
- List of lighthouses in Prince Edward Island
- List of lighthouses in Canada
