= East Point Lighthouse =

Lighthouse at the eastern tip of Prince Edward Island, Canada

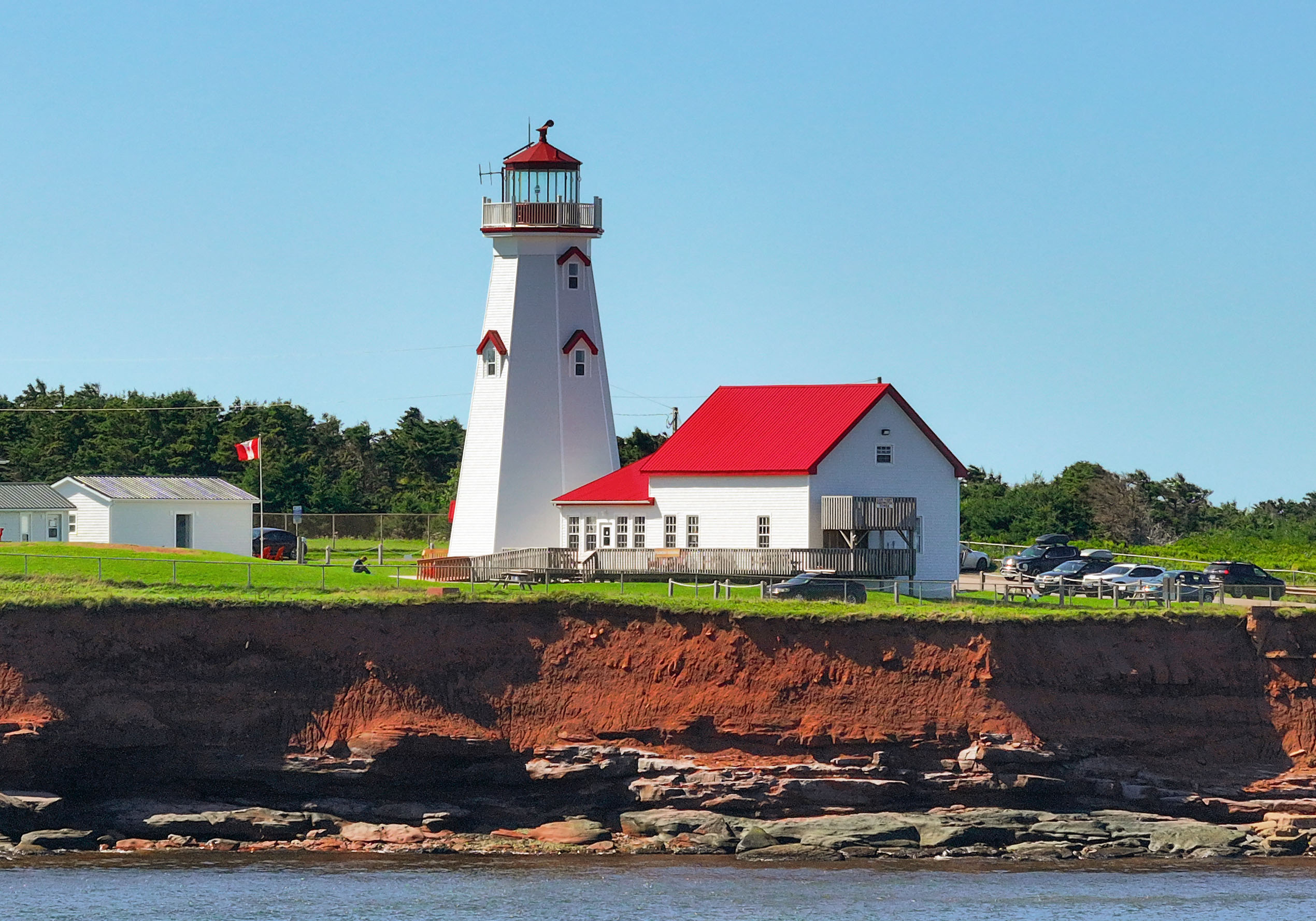
- Location: East Point, Prince Edward Island, Canada
- Coordinates: 46°27′9.1″N 61°58′18.6″W

Tower
- Constructed: 1867
- Construction: Wooden, shingled tower
- Automated: 1989
- Height: 19.5 m (64 ft)
- Shape: Octagonal tower with gallery and lantern
- Markings: White tower, red lantern and trim
- Heritage: designated heritage place, recognized federal heritage building of Canada

Light
- First lit: 1867
- Focal height: 27.1 m (89 ft)
- Range: 11 nmi
- Characteristic: Fl W 5s

The East Point Lighthouse is a lighthouse on Prince Edward Island, Canada. Built in 1867, it remains active and is nicknamed Canada’s Confederation Lighthouse. The 19.5 m octagonal wooden tower stands at the province's eastern tip and was automated in 1989.

== Keepers ==
- Alexander R. Beaton (1867–1871)
- Angus MacDonald (1871–1872)
- Alexander R. Beaton (1872–1897)
- Lauchlin MacDonald (1897–1908)
- Ronald J. MacDonald (1908–1912)
- Angus C. MacIntyre (1912–1926)
- Wilbert Stewart MacIntyre (1926–1957)
- Harry James Harris (1957–1989)

== See also ==
- List of lighthouses in Prince Edward Island
- List of lighthouses in Canada
