= St. Peters Harbour Light =

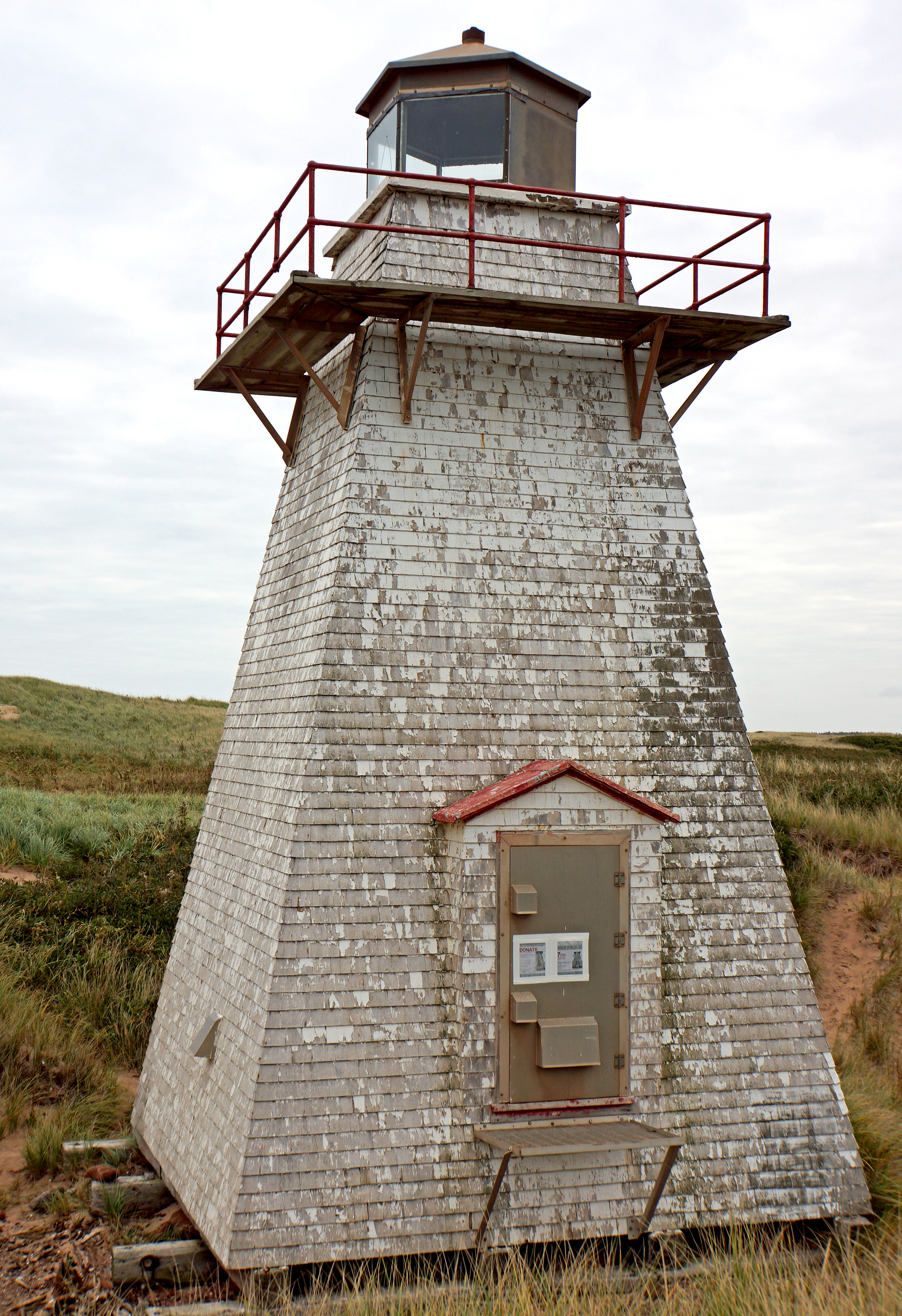
- Location: St. Peters Bay, Prince Edward Island; Canada
- Coordinates: 46°26′31.6″N 62°44′51.0″W

Tower
- Constructed: 1865 (first)
- Construction: wooden tower
- Height: 10.4 metres (34 ft)
- Shape: square tower with lantern and gallery
- Markings: white tower, black lantern, red trim
- Operator: Canadian Coast Guard
- Heritage: heritage lighthouse, Registered Heritage Place

Light
- First lit: 1881 (second)
- Deactivated: 2008
- Focal height: 10 m (33 ft)
- Range: 18 nmi (33 km; 21 mi)
- Characteristic: Fl W 6s

The St. Peters Harbour Light is a lighthouse on St. Peter's Bay, Prince Edward Island, Canada. The station was established in 1865 and the lighthouse itself was built in 1881. It has been inactive since spring 2008.

== Keepers ==
- Martin McInnis 1868 – 1869
- William McGrath 1874 – 1900
- Albert Anderson 1900 – 1912
- James McGrath 1912 – ?

== See also ==
- List of lighthouses in Prince Edward Island
- List of lighthouses in Canada
