= Point Prim Light Station =

Lighthouse on Prince Edward Island, Canada.

Point Prim Lighthouse
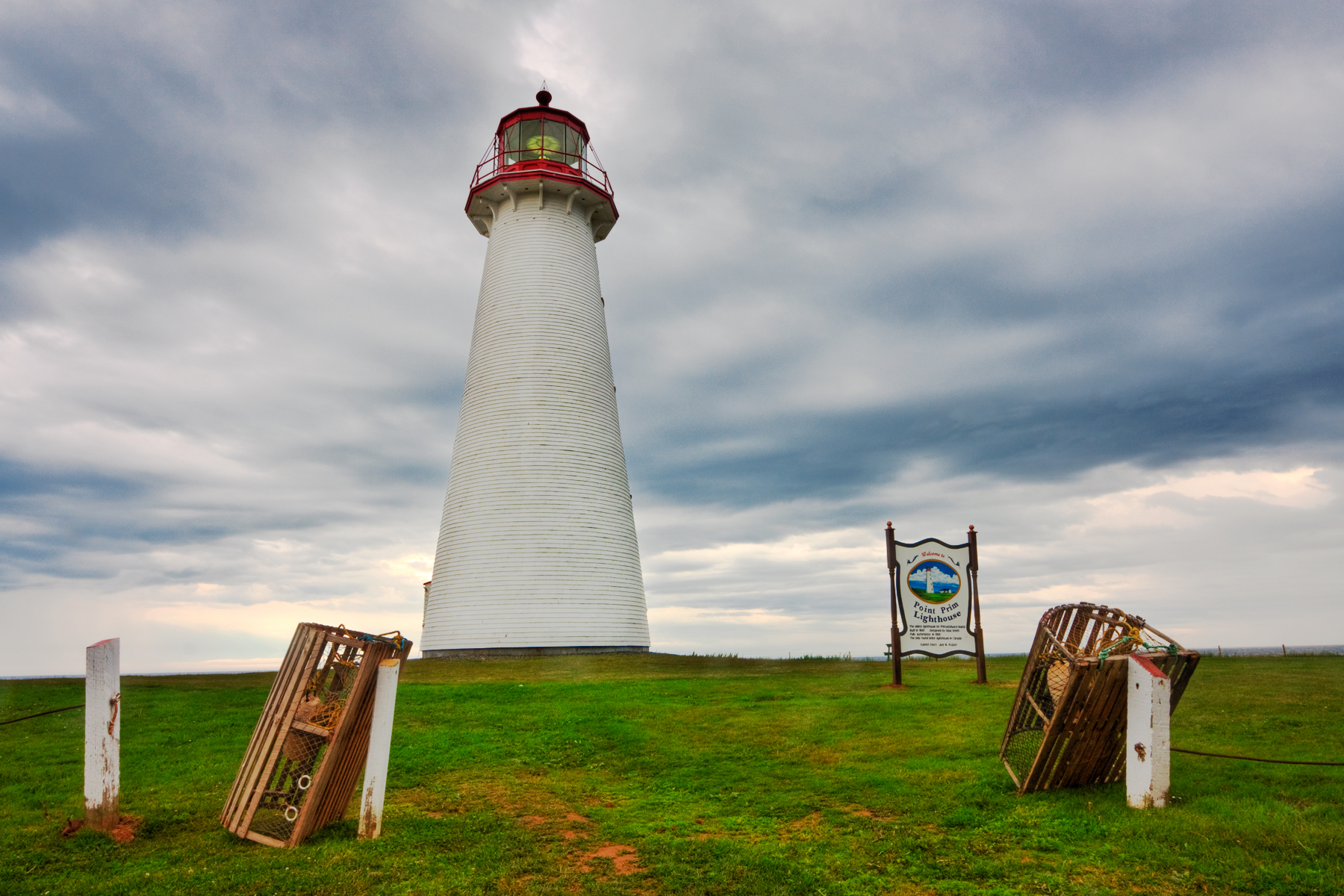
- Location: Point Prim; Prince Edward Island; Canada
- Coordinates: 46°03′00.8″N 63°02′20.6″W

Tower
- Constructed: 1845
- Construction: brick tower
- Automated: 1969
- Height: 18.5 metres (61 ft)
- Shape: cyilindrical tower with balcony and lantern
- Markings: white tower, red lantern and balcony
- Operator: Point Prim Lighthouse
- Heritage: classified federal heritage building of Canada, designated heritage place, heritage lighthouse

Light
- Focal height: 21 metres (69 ft)
- Range: 18 nmi (33 km; 21 mi)
- Characteristic: Fl W 5s

Prince Edward Island Heritage Place
- Type: Designated Heritage Place
- Designated: 2012-10-03
- Reference no.: 7840

The Point Prim Lighthouse is a lighthouse on Prince Edward Island, Canada. It is located at the end of Point Prim Road, also known as Route 209.

The lighthouse itself is 18.5 metres (60.7 feet) tall when measured from its foundation to the weathervane. It is made of brick and is circular—one of only two so constructed in Canada. The other is called Fisgard Lighthouse and is located in British Columbia.

There is a keeper's cottage situated to the southeast of the tower. It measures 19.5 metres (34 feet) by 4 metres (14 feet). Due to the small size of the cottage, the keeper normally lived in it alone. In the summer, however, his family would often come and stay with him.

== Keepers ==
There have been 13 keepers since it was lit.

- John Ings (1841–1854)
- Ewen McLeod (1854–1857)
- Finlay McDonald (1857–1867)
- Simon Murchinson (1867–1870)
- Finlay MacDonald (1870–1872)
- Alex John MacRae (1872–1873)
- Michael McLeod (1873–1897)
- Donald Gillis (1897–1909)
- Alex John McRae (1909–1912)
- Simon A. McLean (1912–1920)
- Angus Alexander Murchison (1920–1955)
- Norman Ross Gillis (1955–1956)
- Manson D. Murchison (1956–1969)

== Management ==
The Point Prim Lighthouse is owned and operated by the Point Prim Lighthouse Society, a non profit community organization run by a group of dedicated volunteers of the Point Prim area. All admissions and sales are used solely for the maintenance and upkeep of the Lighthouse and the site.

== Visitor access ==
Point Prim Light Station is open every day (10am-6pm) from late June to early September. The grounds are always open. Visitors can access the tower in season, by paying admission.

== See also ==
- List of lighthouses in Prince Edward Island
- List of lighthouses in Canada
