= Cascumpeque Light =

Lighthouse in Prince Edward Island, Canada

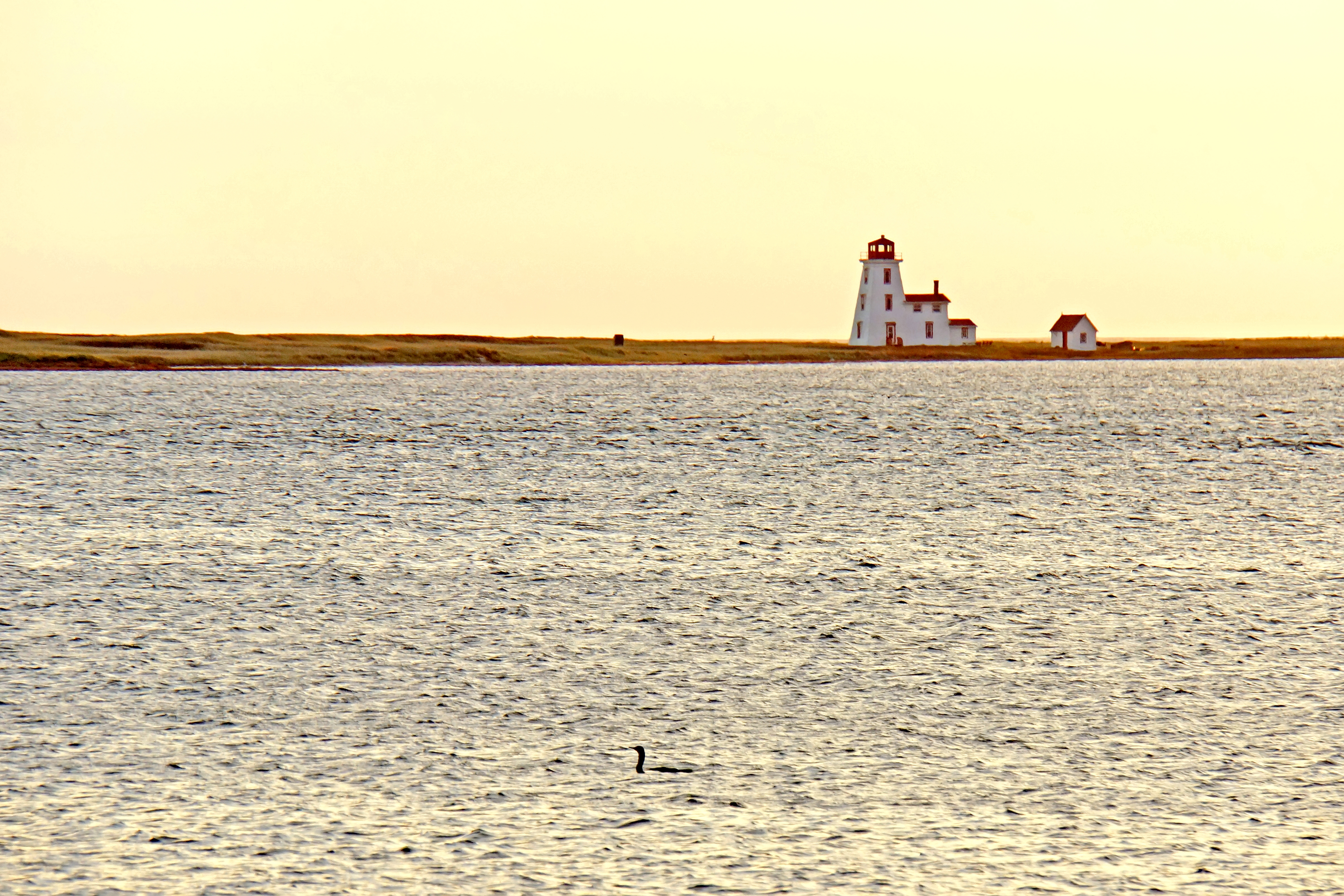
- Location: Northport, Prince Edward Island, Canada
- Coordinates: 46°47′56″N 64°02′13″W

Tower
- Constructed: 1854
- 1876 lighthouse
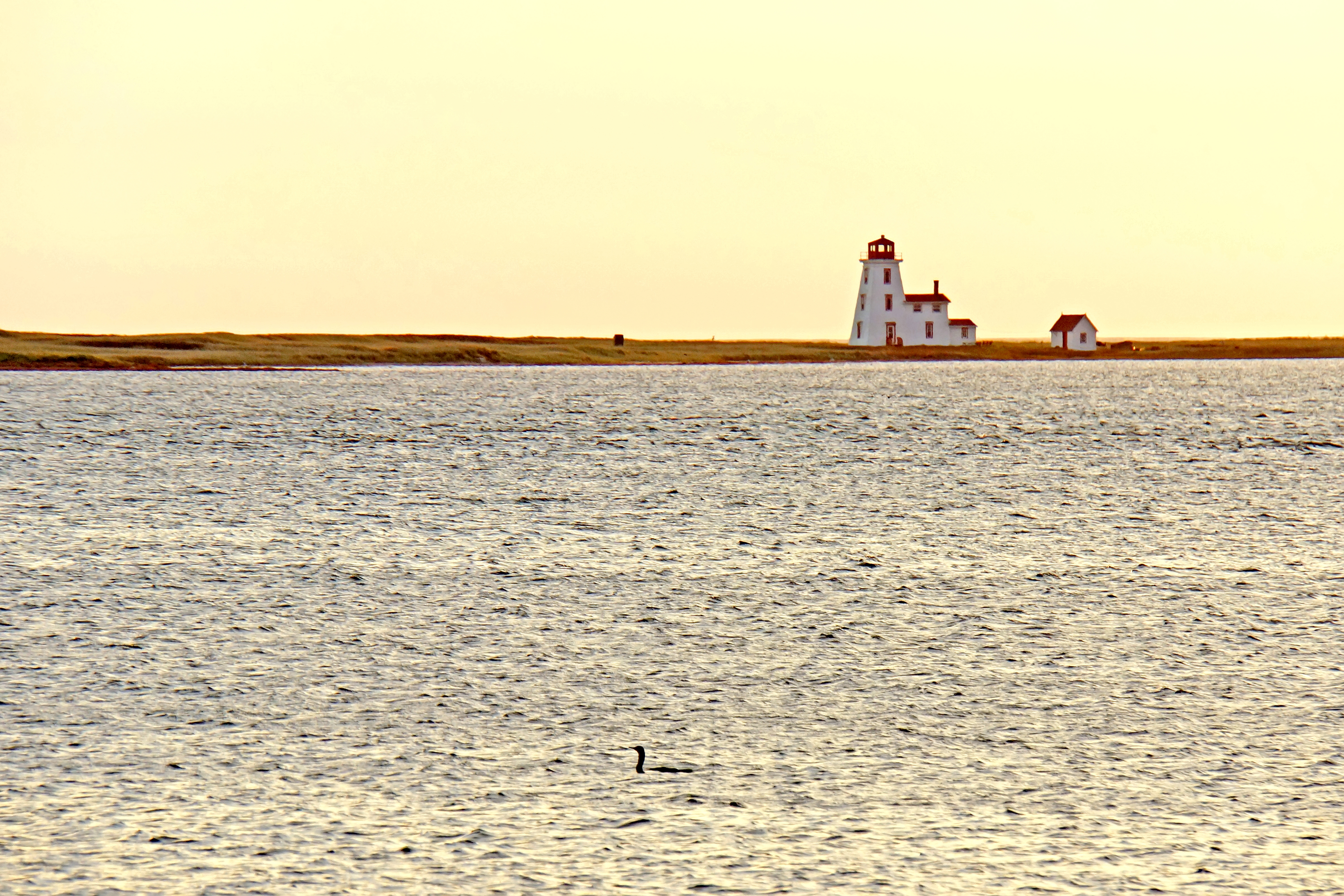
- Constructed: 1876
- Height: 15 m (49 ft)
- Shape: square tower with balcony and lantern attached to a two-story keeper's house
- Markings: white tower, red lantern and trim
- Deactivated: 1968
- 1968 lighthouse
- Constructed: 1968
- Height: 17 m (56 ft)
- Shape: skeletal tower with central wooden covered staircase
- Markings: white tower with horizontal red bands, red lantern
- Deactivated: 2004

The Cascumpeque Light is a deactivated lighthouse on the western north coast of Prince Edward Island, Canada. The station was established in 1856 and the lighthouse itself was built in 1899.

== History ==
A petition to the General Assembly of Prince Edward Island was presented in order to build a lighthouse at Cascumpec Harbour in 1848 followed by another in 1853. The lighthouse was built on Sandy Island, at the entrance of the harbour, and became active the following year. In 1876 was built a new lighthouse because the previous was decayed by age; the white tower was 12.5 metres (41 ft) high and a front range tower was built no far toward the shore in order to indicate the channel. In October 1879 a gale damaged heavily the tower particularly at the foundation.

The area underwent to various works to fight the shore erosion and in 1899 the lighthouse was relocated toward south in a protected place. In 1901 two open towers, with enclosed lantern, replaced the lighthouse. A new light was built in October 1968, it was a skeletal tower with balcony, lantern and a central staircase covered by a wooden structure painted with white and red stripes. In 1999 the lighthouse was degraded and in 2004 the winter storms damaged the place so that the Canadian Coast Guard decided to deactivate the light and to dismantle the tower.

== Keepers ==
- Prospere Gallant 1853–1863
- William Hubbard 1864–1867
- Asa McCabe 1867–1879
- Mrs. Asa McCabe 1879–1880
- John McCabe 1880–1894
- F. J. Cahill 1894–1897
- James C. Tuplin 1897–1912
- D. Fraser 1912–1913
- William H. Mallet 1913–1944
- Justin F. Mallett 1943–1944
- Maurice Perry (1944),
- Wilfred Richard Gaudin 1944–1967

== See also ==
- List of lighthouses in Prince Edward Island
- List of lighthouses in Canada
