= List of lighthouses in Prince Edward Island =

This is a list of lighthouses in the province of Prince Edward Island, Canada.

Name	Image	Water body	Region	Location	Built	Notes
Annandale Range Lights		Boughton River, Boughton Bay	Kings County	46.2663115, -62.4368064 and 46.2591938, -62.4221566		
Belle Creek Light						No longer standing
Big Tignish Light		Gulf of St. Lawrence	Prince County	46.946591113709395, -63.99468833223997	1880	Relocated to Fishermen's Haven Park in 2009. Also known as Tignish Run Lighthouse or Jude's Point Lighthouse. Decommissioned.
Blockhouse Point Light	Blockhouse Point Lighthouse on Prince Edward Island	Entrance to Charlottetown Harbour	Queens County	46.19115664726282, -63.129220378021124	1876	Ownership transferred to the Abegweit First Nation in 2024.
Brighton Beach Range Lights	Brighton Lighthouse on Prince Edward Island					
Brush Point Range Lights						
Brush Wharf Range Lights						
Cape Bear Light						
Cape Egmont Light						
Cape Tryon Light	Cape Tryon Lighthouse on Prince Edward Island					
Cardigan River Light						No longer standing
Cascumpeque Light						
Covehead Harbour Light						
Douse Point Range Lights						
East Point Light						
Fish Island Light						
Georgetown Range Lights						
Haszard Point Range Lights						
Howards Cove Light						
Indian Head Light		Summerside Harbor	Prince County	46.379728, -63.817055		
Leards Range Lights						
Little Channel Range Lights						
Malpeque Harbour Approach Range Lights						
Malpeque Outer Range Lights						
Miminegash Range Lights						
Murray Harbour Range Lights						
New London Range Lights	New London Lighthouse on Prince Edward Island					
North Cape Light						
North Rustico Harbour Light						
Northport Range Lights						
Palmer Range Lights						
Panmure Head Light						
Point Prim Light Station						
Port Borden Pier Light	Port Borden Pier Lighthouse on Prince Edward Island					
Port Borden Range Lights	Port Borden Back Range Lighthouse on Prince Edward Island Port Borden Front Range Lighthouse on Prince Edward Island					
Sandy Island Range Lights						No longer standing
Seacow Head Light	Seacow Head Lighthouse on Prince Edward Island					
Shipwreck Point Light						
Souris East Breakwater Light						No longer standing
St. Peter's Island Light						
St. Peters Harbour Light						
Summerside Outer Range Lights						
Summerside Range Lights						
Tracadie Range Lights						No longer standing
Warren Cove Range Lights	Warren Cove Front Range Lighthouse on Prince Edward Island Warren Cove Back Range Lighthouse on Prince Edward Island					
West Point Light						
Wood Islands Lighthouse		Northumberland Strait	Southeast Queens County	Wood Islands	1876	Deactivated as a Fisheries and Oceans Canada Navigation Aid
Wrights Range Lights						

== See also ==
- List of lighthouses in Canada
