= Big Tignish Light =

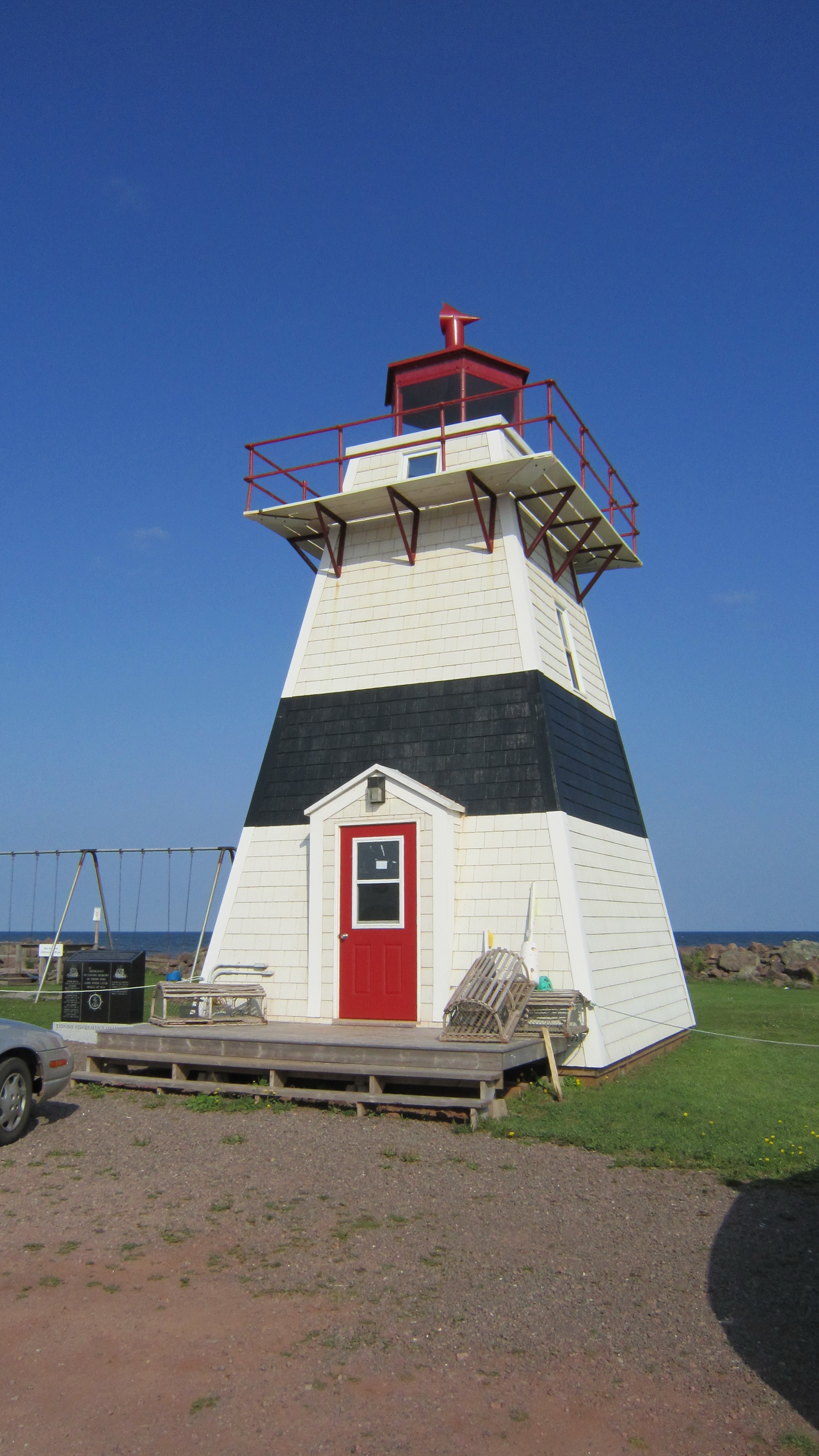
- The lighthouse in 2011
- Location: Prince Edward Island; Canada
- Coordinates: 46°56′45.9″N 63°59′39.6″W

Tower
- Constructed: 1877 (first)
- Construction: wooden tower
- Height: 8.2 metres (27 ft)
- Shape: square truncated tower with balcony and lantern
- Markings: white tower with black horizontal band, red lantern and trim
- Operator: Tignish Shore Community Council.

Light
- First lit: 1881 (current)
- Deactivated: 1997
- Focal height: 10.7 metres (35 ft)

The Big Tignish Light is a lighthouse on Prince Edward Island, Canada. It was built in 1881 but then deactivated in 1997. The unused lighthouse began to fall into disrepair, until it was relocated to the Fisherman's Haven Community Park in 2009, where it was renovated and repainted.

== Keepers ==
- Isidore Chasson 1877–1881
- Isidore Gaudet 1881–1894
- J.S Richard 1894–1895
- Fidele J. Gaudet 1895–1897
- Agate Gaudet 1897–1912
- D. Handrahan 1912–?
- Jerome J. Perry 1923–1956
- Alphonse Gaudet 1956–1962

== See also ==
- List of lighthouses in Prince Edward Island
- List of lighthouses in Canada
