= Annandale Range Lights =

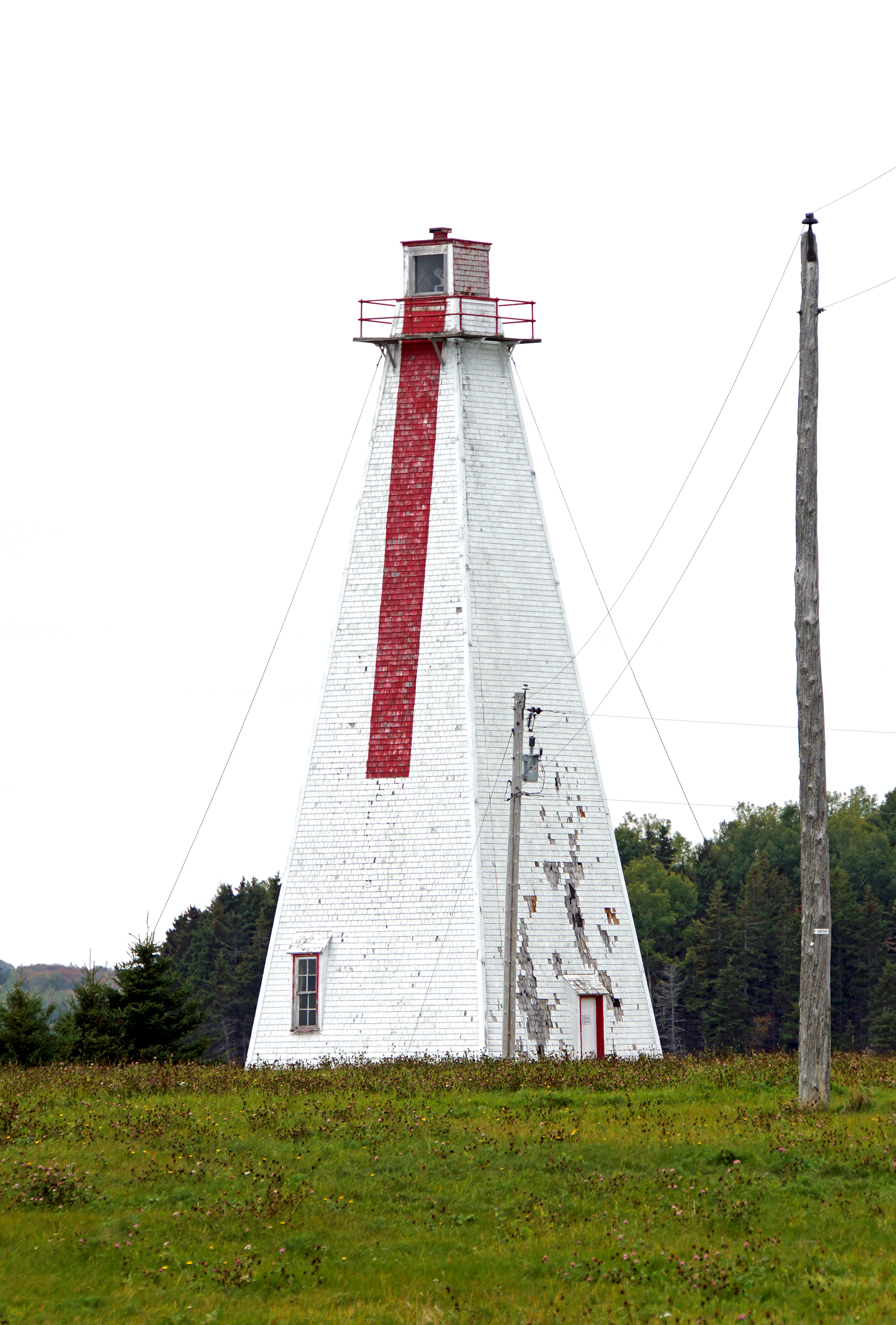
- Annandale Rear Range
- Location: Prince Edward Island; Canada
- Coordinates: 46°15′33.1″N 62°25′19.9″W

Tower
- Constructed: 1898
- Shape: square pyramidal tower
- Markings: white tower with red vertical stripes

Light
- Deactivated: 1925
- Range: 400 metres

The Annandale Range Lights are a set of range lights on the east coast of Prince Edward Island, Canada. The range was established in 1898 but is now inactive. The original front range light was relocated in 1990 and was replaced by a new building of a similar design that now operates as a sector light. The lights are white pyramid-shaped structures of different heights, each with a red vertical stripe.

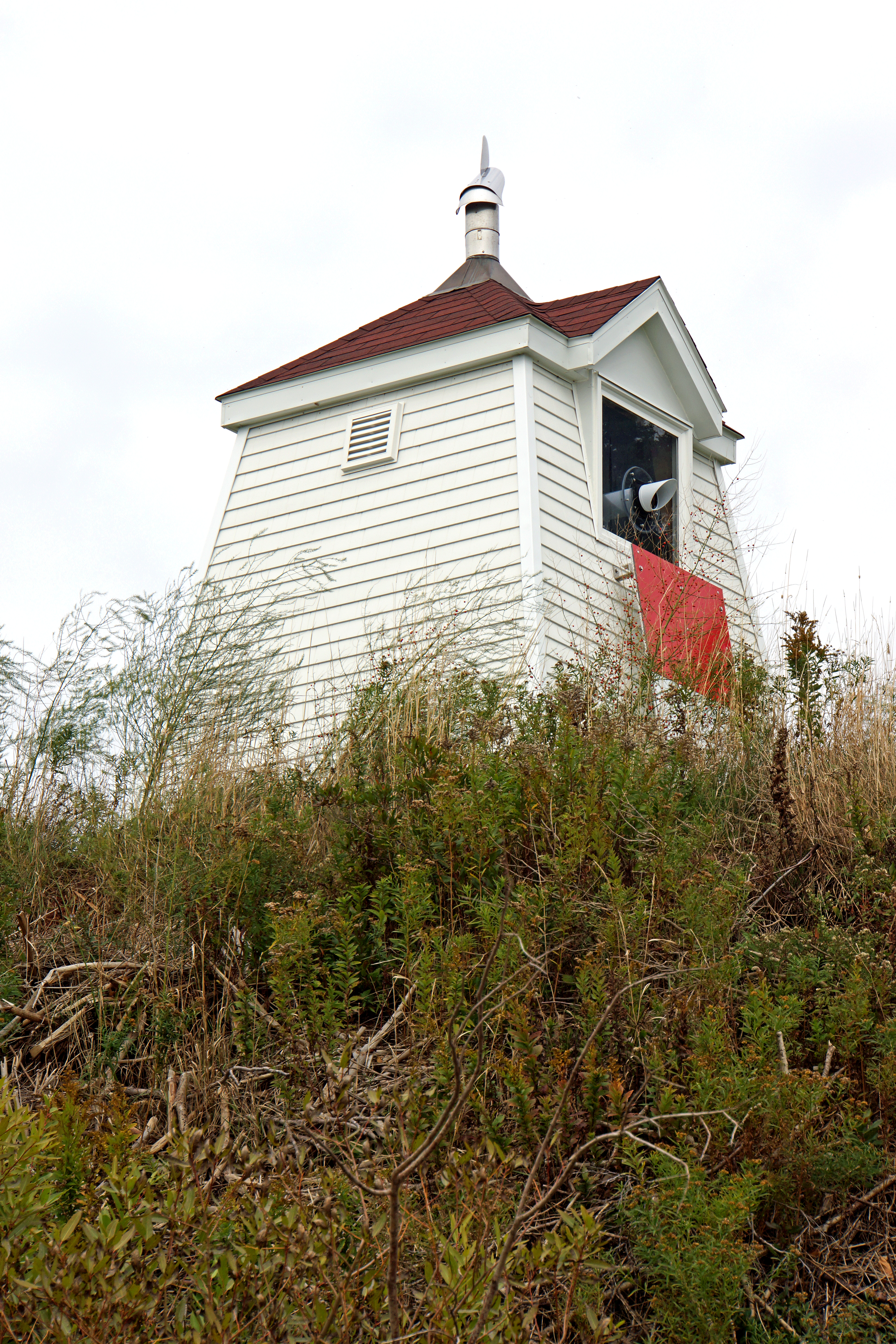
Annandale Front Range

== See also ==
- List of lighthouses in Prince Edward Island
