= Little Channel Range Lights =

Little Channel Range Rear Light
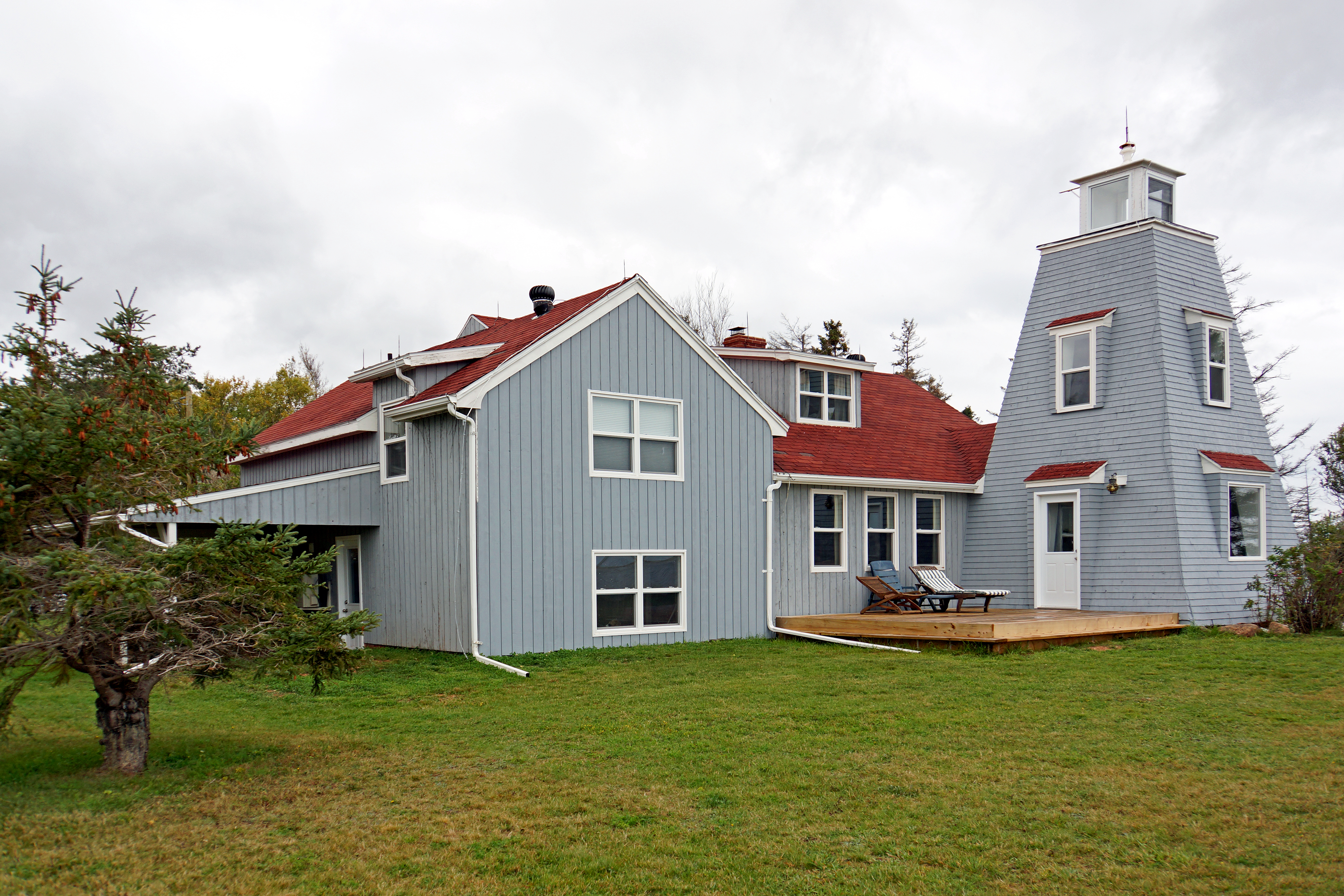
- Little Channel Lighthouse in 2015; the rear light attached to a dwelling
- Location: Conway Inlet, Prince Edward Island; Canada
- Coordinates: 46°41′15″N 63°56′32″W

Tower
- Constructed: 1872 (first)
- Construction: wooden tower
- Automated: 1947
- Height: 9.1 metres (30 ft)
- Shape: square tower with balcony and lantern attached to the keeper’s cottage
- Markings: lightblue-grey tower and lantern, red trim
- Operator: private since 2014

Light
- First lit: 1877 (second)
- Deactivated: 1969

The Little Channel Range Lights were a set of range lights on Prince Edward Island, Canada. They were built in 1873, and deactivated in 1969; only the rear tower has survived.

== See also ==
- List of lighthouses in Prince Edward Island
- List of lighthouses in Canada
