= Malpeque Outer Range Lights =

Malpeque Outer Range Front Light
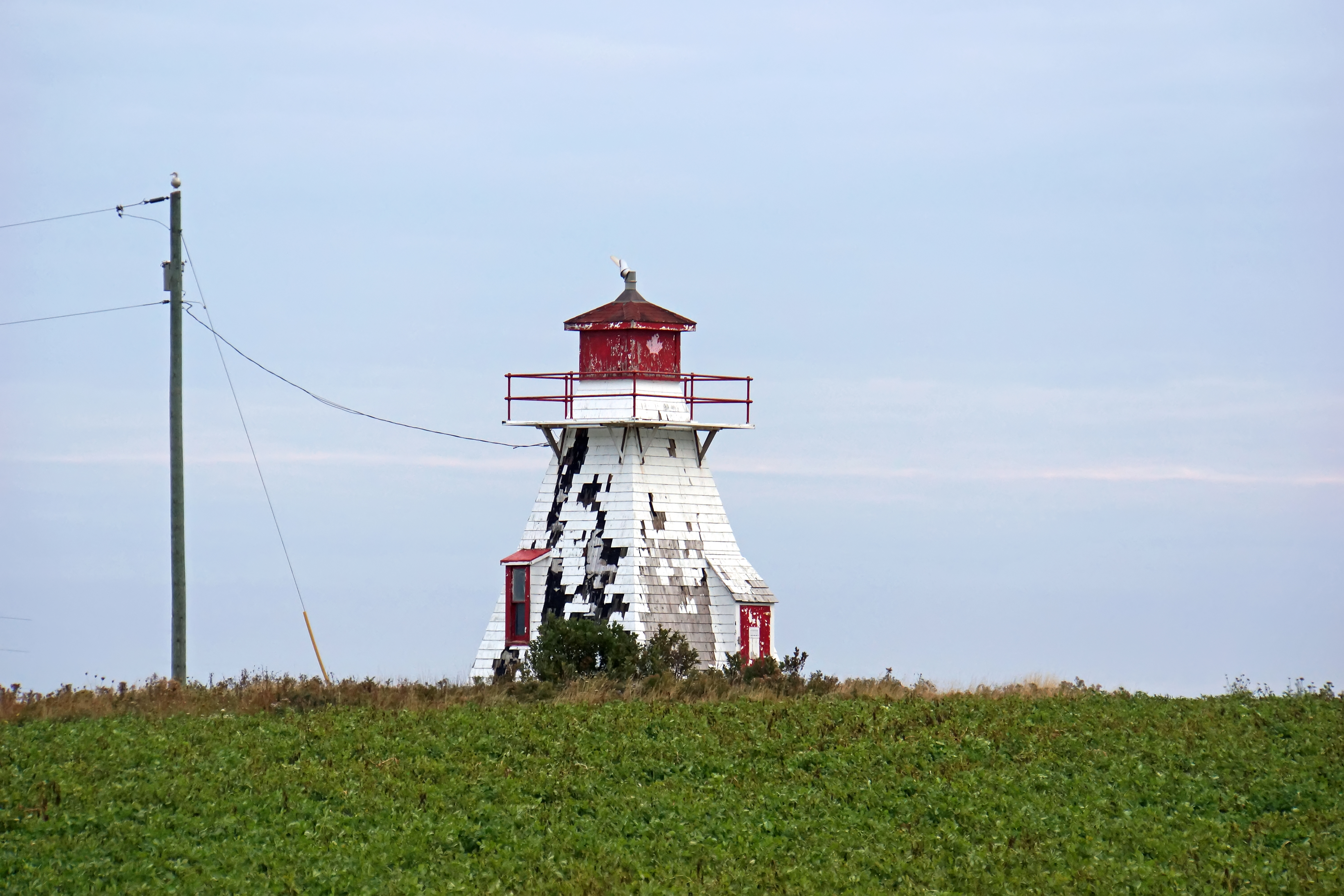
- Location: Fish Island; Prince Edward Island; Canada
- Coordinates: 46.559157°N 63.702667°W

Tower
- Constructed: 1876 (first)
- Construction: wooden tower
- Height: 14 metres (46 ft)
- Shape: square tower with lantern
- Markings: white tower, red trim
- Operator: Cabot Beach Provincial Park

Light
- First lit: 1961 (last)
- Deactivated: 1980s

The Malpeque Outer Range Lights are a set of range lights on Prince Edward Island, Canada. They were built in 1922, and are still active.

== See also ==
- List of lighthouses in Prince Edward Island
- List of lighthouses in Canada
