= Malpeque Harbour Approach Range Lights =

Malpeque Harbour Approach Range Rear Light
- Location: Hog Island; Prince Edward Island; Canada
- Coordinates: 46°34′40″N 63°43′11″W

Tower
- Constructed: 1961
- Construction: steel skeletal tower and wooden upper covered section
- Height: 15.2 metres (50 ft)
- Shape: square tower with balcony and lantern
- Markings: red skeletal tower, white upper section
- Operator: Canadian Coast Guard

Light
- First lit: 1961
- Deactivated: 2011
- Focal height: 16.8 metres (55 ft)
- Range: 10 nautical miles (19 km; 12 mi)
- Characteristic: Iso W 4s

The Malpeque Harbour Approach Range Lights are a set of range lights on Prince Edward Island, Canada. The current rear tower was built in 1961.

== See also ==
- List of lighthouses in Prince Edward Island
- List of lighthouses in Canada
