= William P. Anderson =

Canadian civil engineer

William Patrick Anderson CMG
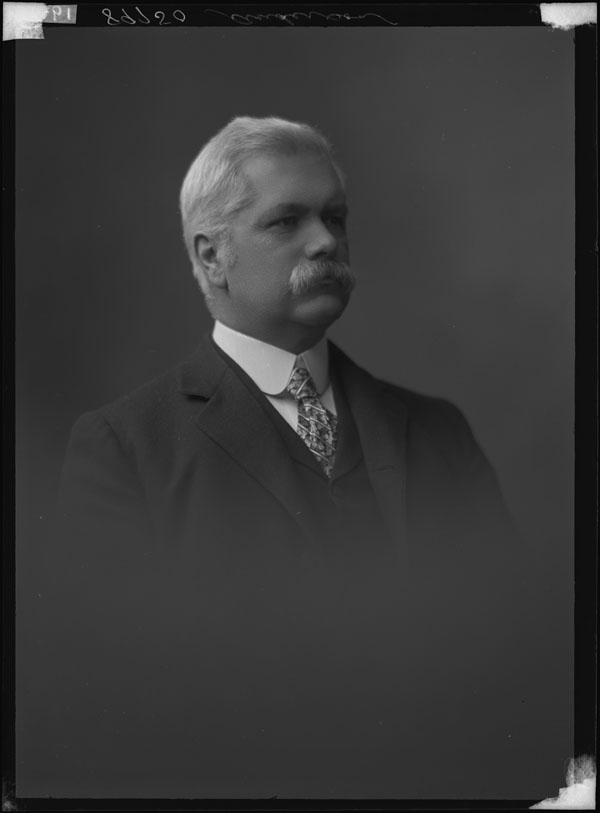
- William Patrick Anderson in 1904
- Born: September 4, 1851; Levis, Canada East
- Died: February 1, 1927 (aged 75); Ottawa, Canada
- Education: Bishop's University; Manitoba College
- Occupations: Civil engineer, surveyor, marksman
- Spouse: Dorothea Susannah Small (m. 1876)

William Patrick Anderson CMG (1851–1927) was a Canadian civil engineer. He was Superintendent of Lighthouses for almost 40 years, and was responsible for many of the more notable lighthouses in Canada.

== Early life and career ==
He was born September 4, 1851, at Levis, Canada East, and educated at what is now Bishop's University. After studying for a year at Manitoba College, he began work as a railway and township surveyor. In 1874, he began work as a draftsman at the Department of Marine and Fisheries in Ottawa, working on the design of lighthouses. In 1876 he married Dorothea Susannah Small.

== Later career ==
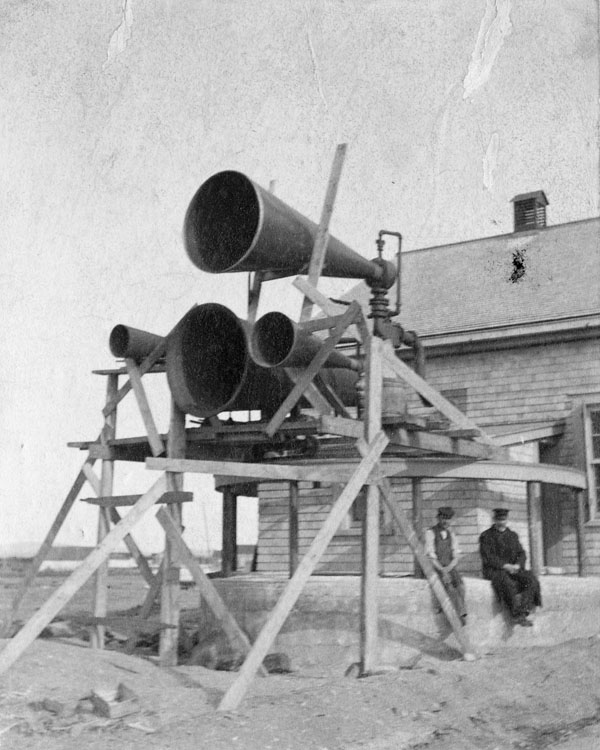
Foghorn with experimental trumpets tested near Pointe-au-Père Light, 1903

Anderson became Chief Engineer of the department in 1880, and served continuously until his retirement in 1919. During his career, he designed and built more than 500 lighthouses and fifty fog-alarm stations across Canada. Among the more important works may be mentioned the Colchester Reef lighthouse (1885) on a caisson in Lake Erie, the construction and installation in 1898 of the first-order fog siren station on Belle Isle (Newfoundland and Labrador), and the nine flying buttress lighthouses at Pointe-au-Pere, Escarpment Bagot, Estevan Point, Michipicoten Island, Caribou Island, Belle Isle Northeast, Cape Bauld, Cape Norman, and Cape Anguille. Near the end of his career, Anderson designed the visually appealing Point Abino Lighthouse near Fort Erie, Ontario.

Anderson had an active interest in military matters. He joined the Canadian Militia in 1864, when he was 14 years old, saw active service during the First and Second Fenian Raids, and later commanded the Ottawa and Carleton Rifles regiment in the militia. He was made a companion of the Order of St. Michael and St. George in 1913.

He was a crack marksman, winning ten Dominion and Provincial Rifle medals, the McDougall Cup in 1879, and winning a place in the Governor General's Cup in 1879, 1880, 1885 and 1887 as well as being a member and commandant on two Canadian Bisley teams. He was Chair of the Small Arms Committee of Canada, as well as a Member of Council and Life Governor of the Dominion Rifle Association.

He was founder and editor of the Canadian Militia Gazette, and Chairman of the Geographic Board of Canada, 1911-1913 and 1925–26, being a member from 1898 to 1926. Also a charter member of the Canadian Society of Civil Engineers and the Engineering Institute of Canada. He was Chair of the Ottawa Public School Board, as well as contributing many articles to Encyclopædia Britannica.

Colonel William P. Anderson died at home in Ottawa on February 1, 1927, and was survived by his wife, a daughter, and four sons. His grave is in Beechwood Cemetery.

== See also ==
- Henri de Miffonis
- History of Lighthouses in Canada
