= History of lighthouses in Canada =

The history of lighthouses in Canada dates to 1734.

== The 18th century ==
The Louisbourg Lighthouse was the first lighthouse in what was to become Canada (and the second in North America after the 1716 Boston Light). It was constructed at the French fortress of Louisbourg on Cape Breton Island in 1734, patterned after the 1682 Phare des Baleines at Saint-Clément-des-Baleines. The Louisbourg Lighthouse was destroyed by British troops during the siege of 1758, and rebuilt in 1842; the rubble of the original tower is visible at the base of the current lighthouse, which dates from 1923.

Next came the Sambro Island Light in 1760. Located at the entrance to Halifax harbor, it has been upgraded over the years but remains the oldest continuously operating lighthouse in North America, predating New Jersey's Sandy Hook Light by four years, and such venerable lighthouses as Virginia's Cape Henry Light, Maine's Portland Head Light, and Long Island's Montauk Point Light by three decades.

Another early lighthouse in the Maritime provinces, at Cape Roseway dates from 1788 when Shelburne was booming as the largest settlement of United Empire Loyalists on the continent. The 92-foot (28 m) octagonal masonry tower on McNutts Island, Nova Scotia, was braced with wooden timbers and had a clapboard exterior. It was damaged beyond repair by fire after being hit by lightning in 1959.

In 1791 the first lighthouse was built at the entrance to Saint John on Partridge Island, New Brunswick. Six years earlier, the first immigration quarantine station in Canada had been established there. The other major quarantine station, at Grosse Ile, Quebec, was built as a hasty response to the cholera epidemic of 1832. In that same year, the original lighthouse at Partridge Island was destroyed by fire. In 1859 the second lighthouse was equipped with the first steam-powered fog whistle, an invention of Robert Foulis. The third Partridge Island lighthouse was operational from 1880 until it was replaced by a concrete octagonal tower in 1959.

== Early 19th century ==
John Ford designed Gibraltar Point Lighthouse on what is now known as the Toronto Islands in 1829. It was decommissioned in 1907, but remains as the oldest existing lighthouse on the Great Lakes, since the one built in 1804 at the mouth of the Niagara River was demolished to make room for Fort Mississauga during the War of 1812.

Other early lighthouses on Lake Ontario included False Ducks Island in 1828, Point Petre in 1831, Nine Mile Point in 1833, and Presqu'ile in 1840. The latter two are still standing, although Presqu'ile had its lantern removed in 1965. In that same year, False Duck was demolished and its lantern eventually became the centrepiece of Mariner's Memorial Lighthouse Park and Museum near Milford, Ontario.

Meanwhile, in Lower Canada (i.e. Quebec), an organisation named after the British Trinity House was established in 1805. One of their first projects was to have Edward Cannon erect a circular build a lighthouse on Ile Verte at the treacherous junction of the Saguenay and Saint Lawrence rivers. The 40-foot (12 m) masonry tower of 1809 vintage is the third-oldest Canadian lighthouse, and served as a model for those built downstream at Pointe des Monts Le phare in 1830, at Southwest Point and Heath Point (the eastern tip) on shipwreck haven Anticosti Island in 1835, at South Pillar and Ile Bicquette Île Bicquette in 1843, and at Ile Rouge in 1848.

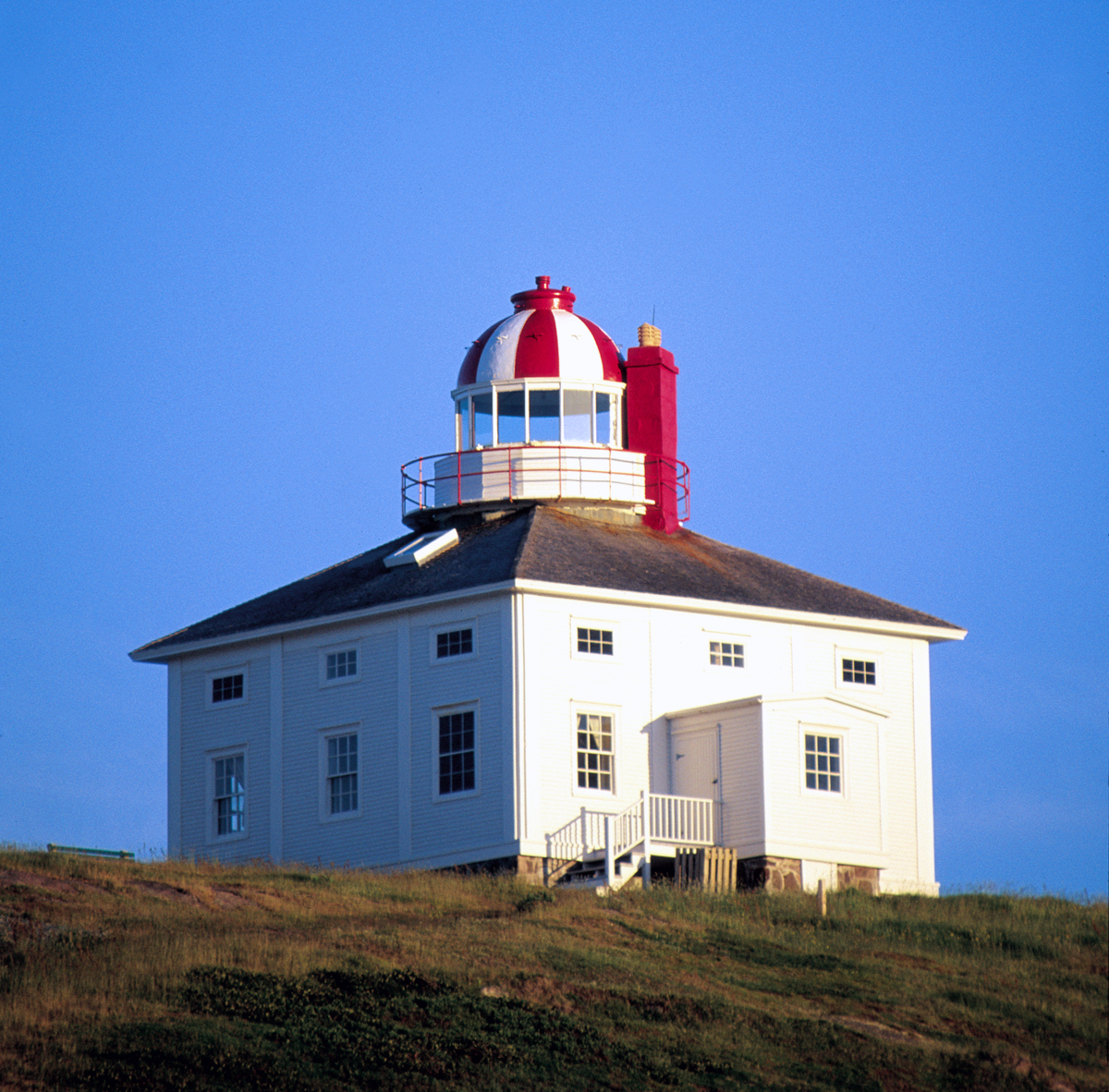
Cape Spear lightbouse

In 1813 the earliest lighthouse on Newfoundland was built at Fort Amherst to mark "The Narrows" of St. John's harbor. Cape Spear and Cape Bonavista were built by Britain's Trinity House in 1836 and 1843, receiving the old reflector lamp apparatus from Scotland's famous Inchkeith and Bell Rock lighthouses, respectively.

The shipbuilding boom in Canada's Atlantic Provinces prompted a flurry of lighthouse construction, starting in 1829 with Head Harbour Lighthouse on Franklin D. Roosevelt's beloved Campobello Island (New Brunswick) in the Bay of Fundy. In 1832 the original 1809 lighthouse on Brier Island at the tip of Digby Neck in Nova Scotia was replaced; the current lighthouse dates from 1944. An important beacon was built in 1830 on desolate Seal Island, Nova Scotia, 18 miles (29 km) offshore and at the gateway to the Bay of Fundy. The timbers of its 67-foot (20 m) octagonal tower have proven to be amazingly durable, although the 1903-vintage lantern and its 1st-order Fresnel lens were replaced (and moved to a replica lighthouse museum in Barrington Passage) in 1979. In fact the eight-sided wooden pattern was used in many subsequent Canadian lighthouses, notably by John Cunningham, in 1845 at wave-washed Gannet Rocks in the Bay of Fundy. The eight-sided wooden pattern was used at Port Burwell on Lake Erie, and in 1840 at Cape Forchu marking the entrance to Yarmouth harbor. In 1962 the original Yarmouth light was replaced by a distinctive concrete tower known locally as "the applecore".

On Cape Breton Island after 1826, the General Mining Association consolidated the mines around Sydney Harbour and greatly increased the shipping of coal to ports on the Atlantic coast. In support of this effort, a lighthouse was built at Low Point in 1832 to aid vessels entering Sydney Harbour. This first lighthouse was an octagonal wood tower, 69 feet high, with red and white stripes and a red round iron lantern containing a third-order double bullseye lens manufactured in France by Barbier, Benard, et Turenne. This first Low Point Lighthouse was replaced in 1932 with an octagonal concrete lighthouse, surmounted by a rare circular iron lantern housing, painted red, the only remaining circular lantern in Nova Scotia; built by Chance Brothers, England's famous builders of lenses and lanterns, currently housing a rotating DCB-36 (36 inch diameter) aerobeacon.

Numerous shipwrecks led to the construction in 1839 of lighthouses at Scatari Island and at both ends of St. Paul Island, Nova Scotia. The original towers were of traditional wood construction, but when the south light burned down in 1914 it was replaced by a cast-iron cylindrical tower; the north tower was replaced c. 1970.

The 60-foot (18 m) conical brick tower built during 1845–7 at Point Prim is the oldest lighthouse on Prince Edward Island. It was designed and built by Isaac Smith, the same eminent architect who designed Province House in Charlottetown.

Around mid-century, the use of whale or seal oil as lantern fuel was alleviated by the development of kerosene by Dr. Abraham Pineo Gesner.

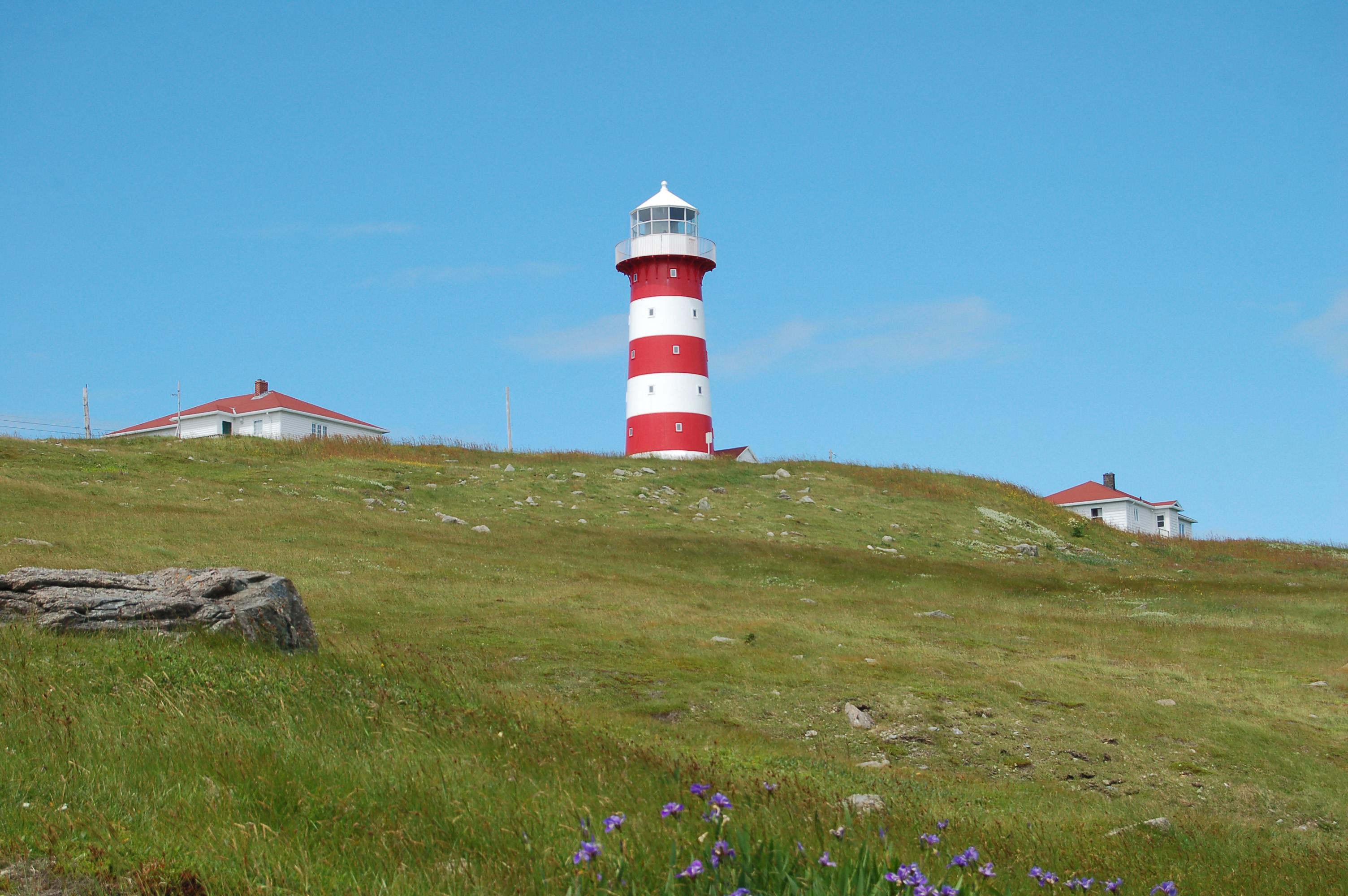
Cape Pine lighthouse

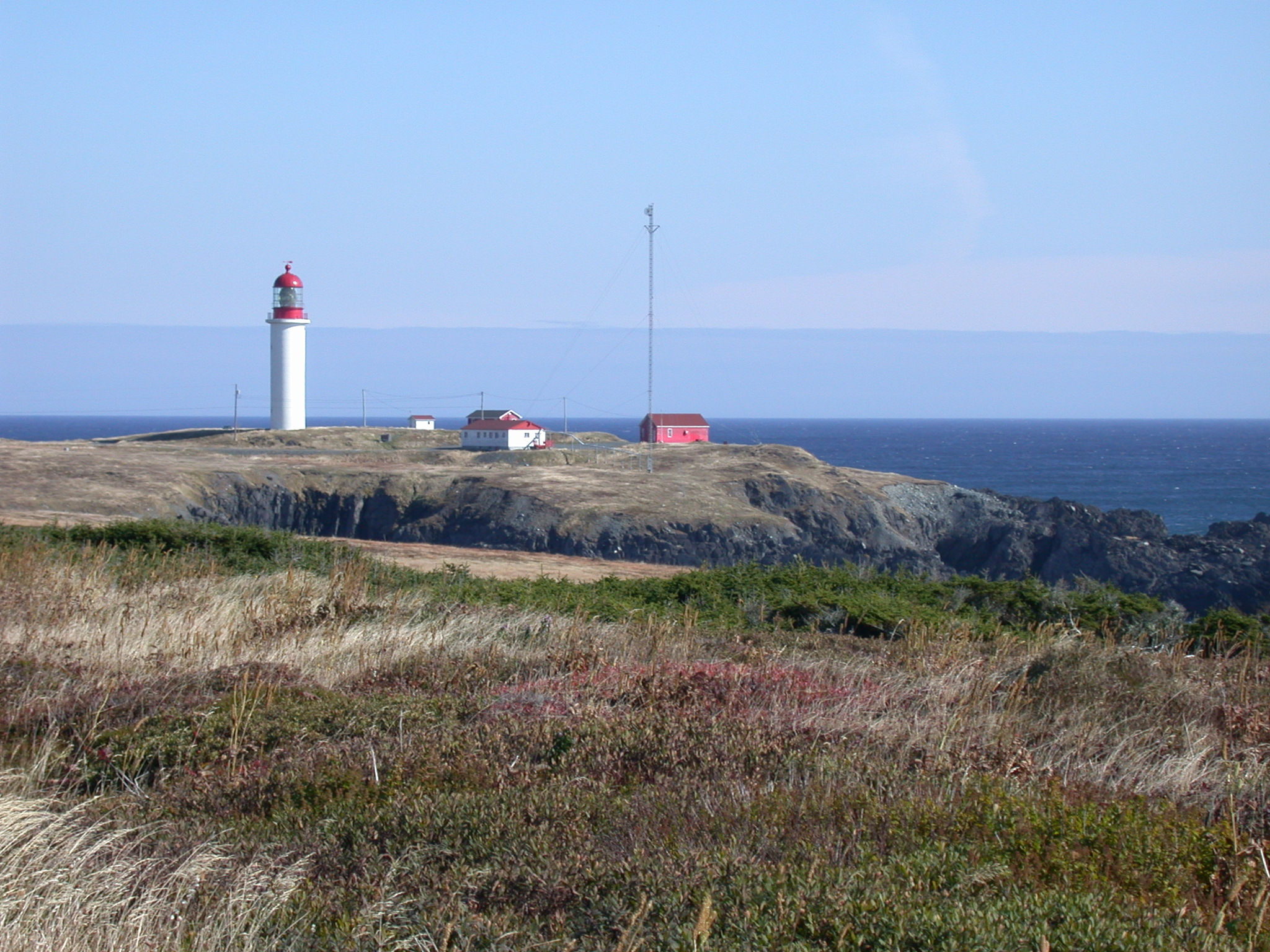
Cape Race lighthouse

In 1851, a 40-year-old mechanism from the Isle of May in Scotland was installed atop Newfoundland's new Cape Pine lighthouse. The tower was designed by the firm Alexander S. Gordon using the same prefabricated cast-iron approach as Gibbs Hill Lighthouse and other outposts of the British Empire. Subsequently, despite being unsuitable for the damp and cold winters, many cast-iron lighthouses were built in Newfoundland, including Channel-Port aux Basques in 1875, Lobster Cove Head in 1892, and the lighthouse which now guards the National Museum of Science & Technology which, after 50 years of service at Cape Race, was dismantled and re-erected with a new lantern at Cape North (NS) in 1906. Then in 1980, after a local outcry had kept the Seal Island lantern from being taken away, the historic lighthouse at the northern tip of Cape Breton was instead targeted for relocation to Ottawa.

In 1884, public clamour following the 1867 Queen of Swansea tragedy led to a cast-iron lighthouse being erected at the summit of Gull Island, off Newfoundland's Bay de Verde peninsula. At an elevation of 525 feet (160 m), it is the highest light on the eastern seaboard.

== The Imperial Lights, 1857-60 ==
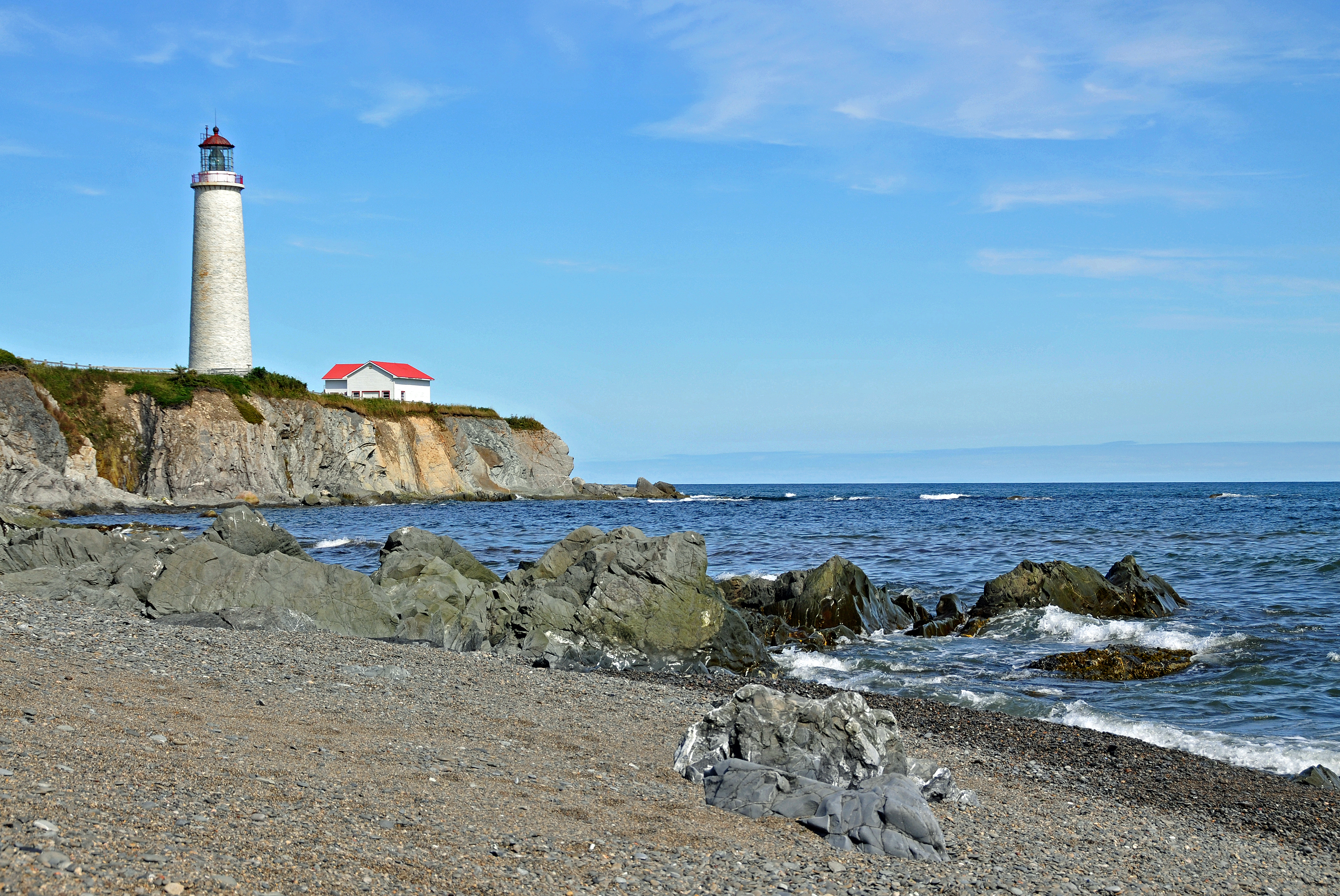
Cap-des-Rosiers Lighthouse, Quebec, built in 1858. A National Historic Site of Canada.

By the mid 19th century it was apparent that the economic development of British North America was being hampered by obsolete navigational aids. Lobbying by the Admiralty and by Canadian shipping magnates such as Montreal's Hugh Allan resulted in an ambitious three-year building program, where all material and construction costs would be borne by Great Britain. The so-called Imperial Towers were tall conical towers of brick or masonry construction where, in some cases, the granite was quarried and prepared by Scottish stonemasons, and shipped to the colony as ballast. By 1850s standards they must have seemed imperial, i.e. built to withstand the ages.

Henri Maurice Perrault designed lighthouses in Lotbinière, Quebec (1860); Pointe-aux-Trembles, Quebec (1862); L'Islet, Quebec (1865); Port St. Francis, Quebec on Lake St. Peter (1865); Isle aux Prunes opposite Verchères, Quebec (1866); and a movable lighthouse at Isle aux Raisins, Quebec (1867).

Four towers were built along the approaches to the Saint Lawrence: at Cap-des-Rosiers on the Gaspe peninsula; in the Strait of Belle Isle; at Pointe Amour near L'Anse Amour on the Labrador coast; and at West Point on Anticosti Island. At 112 feet (34 m), the latter rivalled Cap des Rosiers as the tallest lighthouse in Canada until its replacement by an airport-type beacon and demolition in 1967.

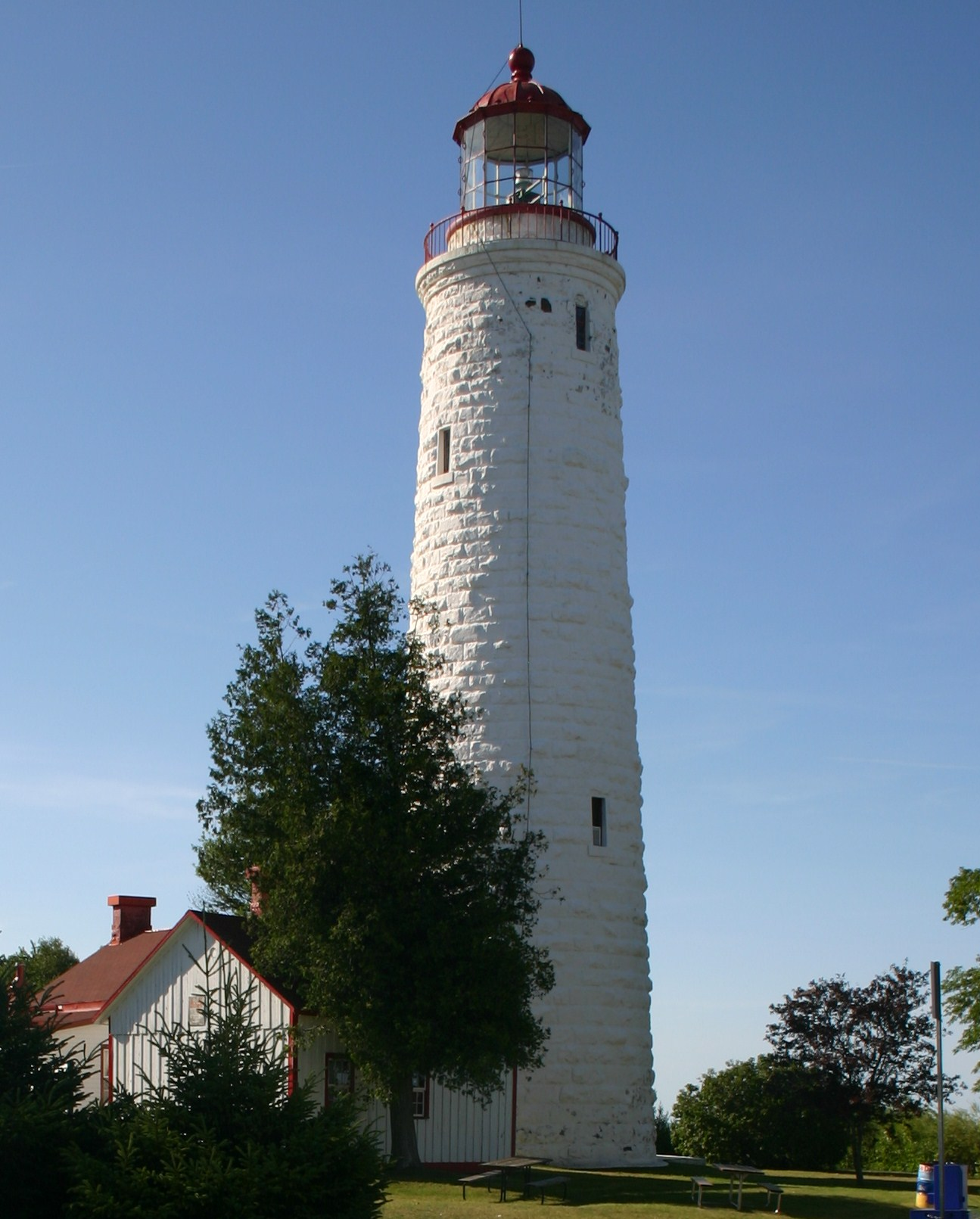
Point clark lighthouse

Six Imperial Towers were built on Lake Huron and Georgian Bay in Ontario, all first lit in 1858 or 1859, because commercial shipping traffic was increasing on the Great Lakes between Canada and the U.S. due to new trade agreements and the opening of the Sault Ste. Marie Canal locks in 1855. These are located at Point Clark, on Chantry Island, Ontario and on islands named Nottawasaga, Christian, Griffith, and Cove. Construction of these limestone towers was entrusted to John Brown (1808–76). They were all 80 feet (24 m) tall, with the exception of Christian Island, a 55-foot (17 m) tower comparable to Brown's 1858 lighthouse at Burlington, Ontario. The lighthouses at Point Clark, Chantry Island and Cove Island have been renovated and all six are currently automated lights. The other three vary in terms of the current condition; Griffith (on a private island), and especially Nottawasaga, are in greatest need of restoration. The Point Clark tower was formally registered as one of the National Historic Sites of Canada, the only lighthouse on the Great Lakes or Georgian Bay to receive this highest-level designation.

Construction of the 60-foot (18 m) wooden lighthouse built on a caisson offshore from Point Pelee in Lake Erie was also undertaken in 1859; it was replaced in 1902 by a lighthouse built of steel plates, which can be seen today at Lakeview Park in Windsor. The Fleet Street Lighthouse in Toronto harbour was built in the 1860s and in 1913 was moved to the corner of Lake Shore Boulevard and Fleet Street, where it can be seen today. The recently restored lighthouse at Brandy Pot Island near Riviere du Loup (PQ) dates from 1862, the same year a wooden lighthouse was built on Bellechasse Island.

Kivas Tully designed a Lighthouse and Keeper's House, at Queen's Wharf, Tonronto, Ontario, in 1861. The lighthouse was relocated in 1929 at Lake Shore Boulevard West and Fleet Street.

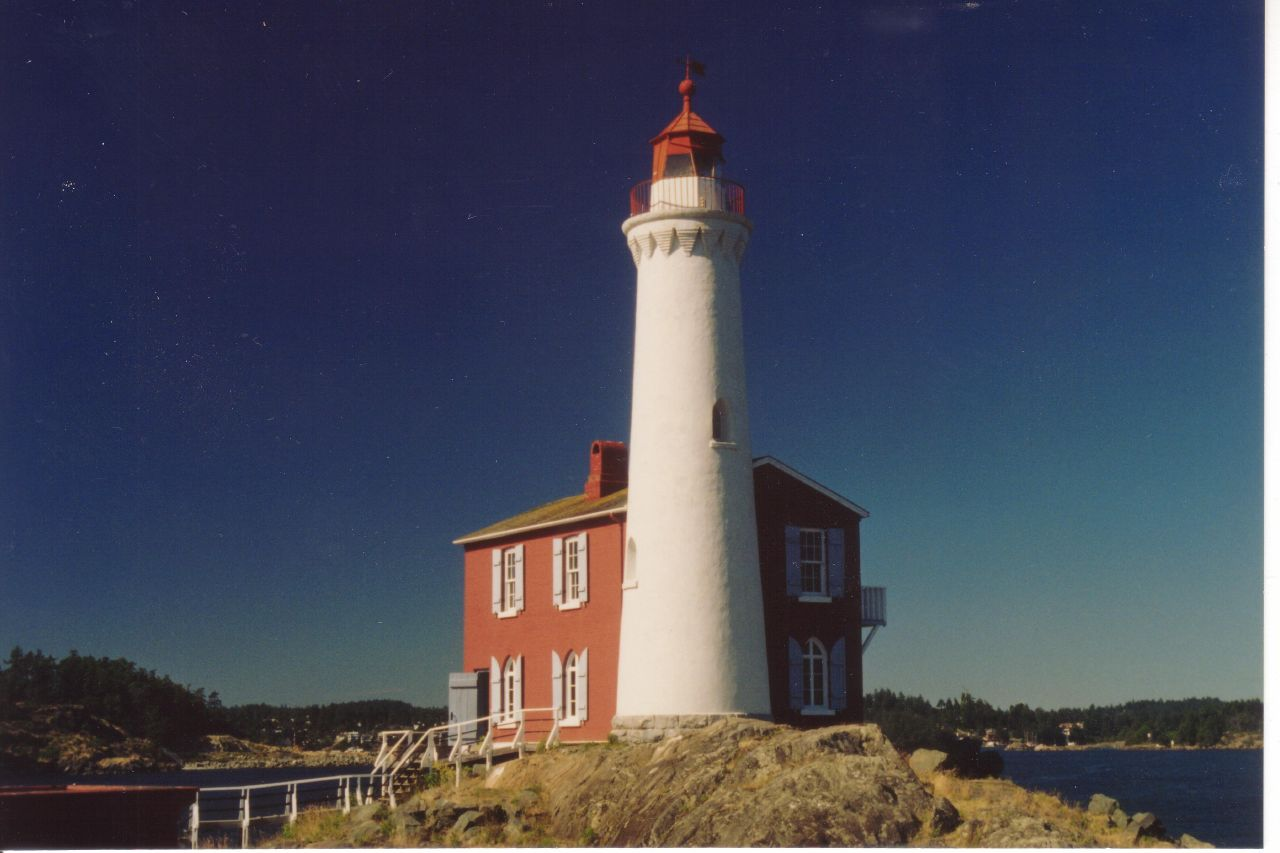
Fisgard Lighthouse, Vancouver Island, BC

Offshore from Vancouver Island on Canada's Pacific coast, the Imperial lighthouses at Race Rocks and what is now Fisgard Lighthouse National Historic Site were built by Herman Otto Tiedemann in 1860 to safeguard the approaches to the Royal Navy base at Esquimalt.

An interesting screw-pile lighthouse was built at Sandheads off the mouth of the Fraser river in 1880; it was demolished in 1913 and replaced by a lightship. After building a long jetty to stabilize the channel location, in 1960 a new lighthouse was built at Sandheads.

== Latter 19th century ==
The new Dominion of Canada undertook another round of lighthouse building following Confederation. The 1870s saw well over 100 new lighthouses go into operation; during this period Sable Island, "the graveyard of the Atlantic", and Bird Rock, an outcrop of the Magdalen Islands archipelago, were finally lit.

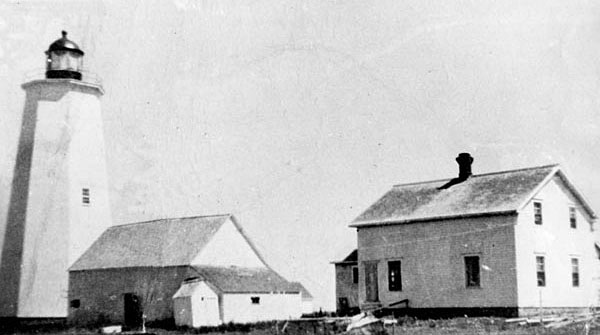
Miscou lighthouse 1930

A great number of lighthouses built during the 19th century were tapering wooden towers, usually four or eight-sided. They had the advantage of being cheap to build, and in some cases could be relocated if the site was threatened by erosion. Surviving examples include Miscou Island and Mulholland Point (on Campobello Island) in New Brunswick, Margaretsville (NS), and Panmure Island, East Point, North Cape, West Point, Cape Bear, and Woods Island on Prince Edward Island.

Many of the towers from the 1870-1900 period were attached to the dwelling, for example Peases Island and East Ironbound Island in Nova Scotia, Hope Island in Georgian Bay, or the second lighthouse at Cap Gaspe in Quebec. Their ranks include a number of picturesque harbour or range lights such as Grande Anse in NB and New London rear range light in PEI.

John Corbett moved to Ottawa, Ontario in 1880 after receiving the appointment of superintendent of lighthouse construction in the Marine Department. He died in 1887.

Unfortunately, there is a long list of wooden lighthouses which burned down, including the second one at Cape Ray in Newfoundland, the one on Ile Haute in the Bay of Fundy, Holland Rock in BC, and the one on remote Greenly Island, south of Labrador. The latter made headlines in 1928 when the German aircraft Bremen crash-landed thereafter making the first successful east–west transatlantic flight.

== Colonel Anderson's Tenure, 1900–1914 ==
In the 1870s responsibility for navigational aids was transferred from the Department of Public Works to the Department of Marine and Fisheries. In 1904 the department's Lighthouse Board was given a broader mission, and its dynamic chairman Colonel William P. Anderson planned an ambitious construction program. Various coastal beacons were upgraded from reflector-type to state-of-the-art Fresnel lenses, manufactured by Barbier, Benard, et Turenne (BBT) of Paris, or Chance Brothers of Birmingham (UK). In order to lessen the dependence on such foreign suppliers, the Dominion Lighthouse Depot was established in a former starch factory at Prescott, Ontario in 1903. Numerous old wooden towers were replaced by reinforced concrete or prefabricated cast-iron towers, examples being Metis, Cap de la Madeleine, Cap Chat and Matane on the Gaspe peninsula, Cape Croker on Georgian Bay, and Cape Race in Newfoundland. The latter was perhaps the most important landfall beacon for North Atlantic traffic, and remains one of a handful of lighthouses in the world equipped with a giant hyperradiant Fresnel lens. It also boasted a new diaphone or compressed-air fog horn, a 1902 invention of Toronto's J.P. Northery Ltd.

In 1904, the pre-fabricated cast-iron lighthouse at Fame Point, near Anse-a-Valleau on the Gaspe coast, became the first maritime wireless (Marconi) station in North America. In 1977, this lighthouse was dismantled and became a tourist attraction in Quebec City, but it was returned to its original site in 1997 and the whole light station, known today as Pointe-à-la-Renommée, has been restored.

To support the higher-order lenses (which floated in a bath of mercury), exposed ferro-concrete towers were sometimes buttressed, such as at Point Atkinson in Lighthouse Park near Vancouver BC, Natashquan Point in Quebec, Ile Parisienne in Lake Superior, or at Langara and Sheringham Point on Vancouver Island. In 1910 one of these towers was built at the windswept summit of Triangle Island, 25 miles (40 km) off the northern tip of Vancouver Island. However, this turned out to be a costly blunder; at an elevation of 650 feet (200 m), the light was far too high to be visible in bad weather. After 10 years, the lantern was dismantled and brought back to the Coast Guard base in Victoria while the original plan of building a lighthouse at Cape Scott was carried out in 1927.

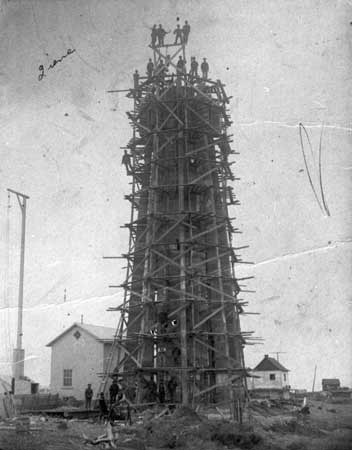
Construction of Pointe-au-Père lighthouse

The art of building tall lighthouses using reinforced concrete reached its ultimate expression in the flying buttresses of Estevan Point on the Pacific Coast, at Michipicoten Island and remote Caribou Island in Lake Superior, at Northeast Belle Isle in the Strait of Belle Isle, at Bagot Bluff on Anticosti Island, and at Pointe-au-Pere near Rimouski, Quebec. At 109 feet (33 m) the latter ranks with Point Amour Lighthouse as Canada's second-tallest lighthouse.

Some lighthouses from the early 1900s were of traditional 8-sided timber construction, such as at Point Riche near Port au Choix, Newfoundland, Henry Island in Cape Breton (NS), at La Martre, Quebec (site of a museum) on the Gulf of Saint Lawrence, Lonely Island in Lake Huron, or at Pachena Point on Vancouver Island, site of the terrible 1906 shipwreck of the SS Valencia. However, the vast majority of post-1910 lighthouses replicated the octagonal pattern using the new ferro-concrete construction technique. Examples are Peggy's Cove and Western Island (NS), Cap Gaspe File:Forillon National Park of Canada 4.jpg and Cap au Saumon (PQ), and Machias Seal Island (NB). This style was carried to impressive height (102 feet) at Cape Sable Island (NS), Long Point in Lake Erie, and Great Duck Island in Lake Huron.

The ornate Point Abino Light Tower near Fort Erie, Ontario dates from 1917. It was built as a memorial to the crew of the Buffalo-based US Lightship #82 which went down with all hands during the infamous Great Lakes Storm of 1913, which claimed a total of twelve ships and 235 lives.

== See also ==
- Henri de Miffonis
