= Lambton (lighthouse tender) =

Canadian lighthouse tender lost in Lake Superior

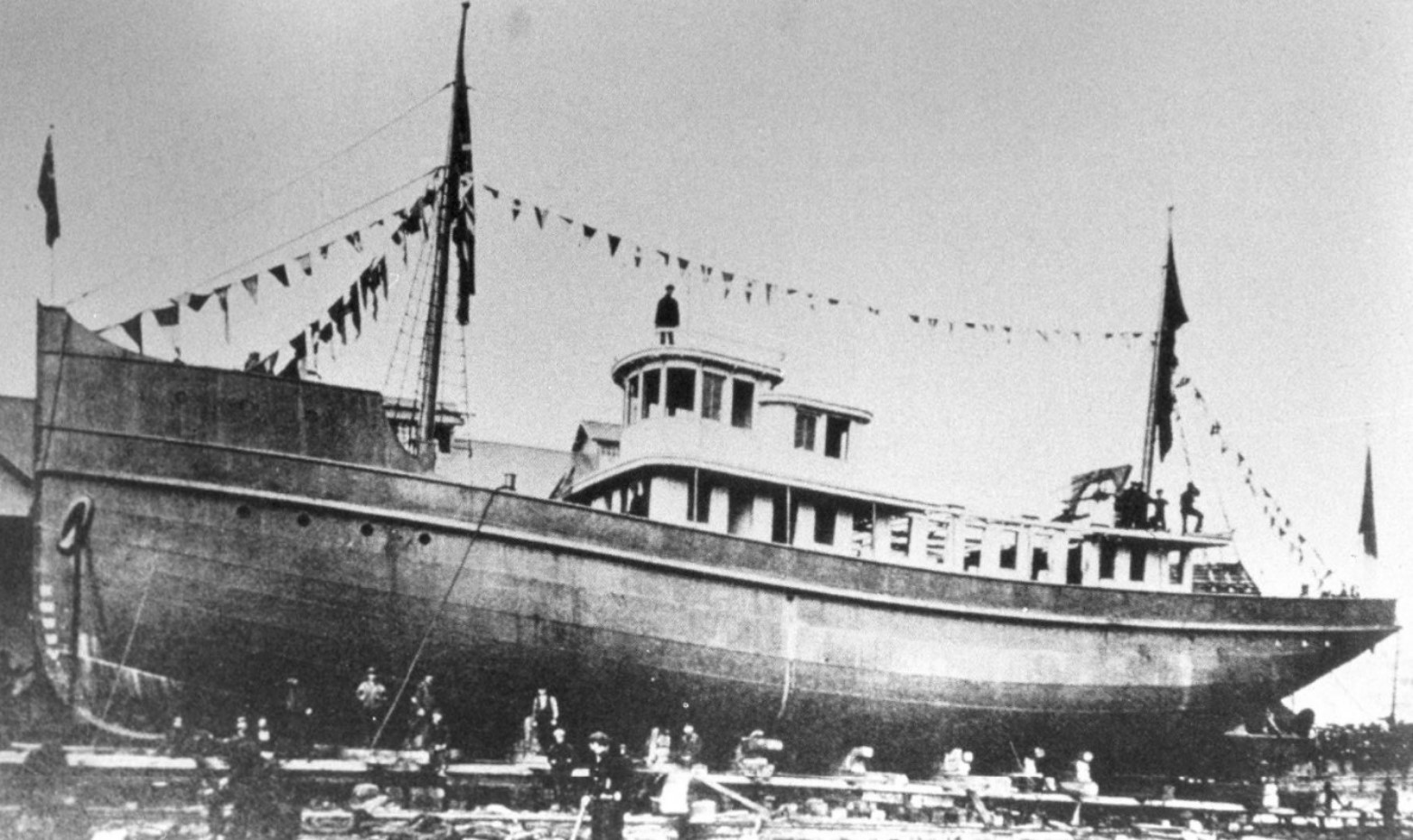

History

Canada
- Name: CGS Lambton
- Operator: Department of Marine and Fisheries
- Builder: Sorel
- Completed: 1909
- Fate: Foundered on 19 April 1922

General characteristics
- Tonnage: 323 (gross)
- Length: 108 ft (33 m)
- Beam: 25 ft (7.6 m)
- Draught: 13 ft (4.0 m)

CGS Lambton was a lighthouse tender that operated for the Canadian government on the Great Lakes in the early 20th century.

Lambton was constructed in 1909 in Sorel, Quebec, and served for the Department of Marine and Fisheries. She was 108 feet (33 m) long, with a beam of 25 feet (7.6 m) and a draft of 13 feet (4.0 m), and measured 323 gross tons.

On April 18, 1922, she departed Sault Ste. Marie, Ontario with keepers for the lighthouses at Ile Parisienne, Caribou Island, and Michipicoten Harbour. She traveled through Whitefish Bay in the company of two other vessels, Glennfinnan and Glenlivet, and sometime during the day Lambton and Glennfinnan collided. Lambton also broke her steering gear, and was forced to proceed with improvised repairs. On the following day, after Lambton had turned north away from the other two ships, a storm blew into the area, with winds as high as 60 miles per hour (97 km/h). Following the storm, it was reported that the lighthouses Lambton had been scheduled to visit were not lit, and a tugboat was dispatched to follow her route to attempt to determine her fate. After almost a week of searching passed with no sign of the ship, Lambton was declared lost.

== See also ==
- Graveyard of the Great Lakes
