= Henri de Miffonis =

French-Canadian civil engineer (1882–1955)

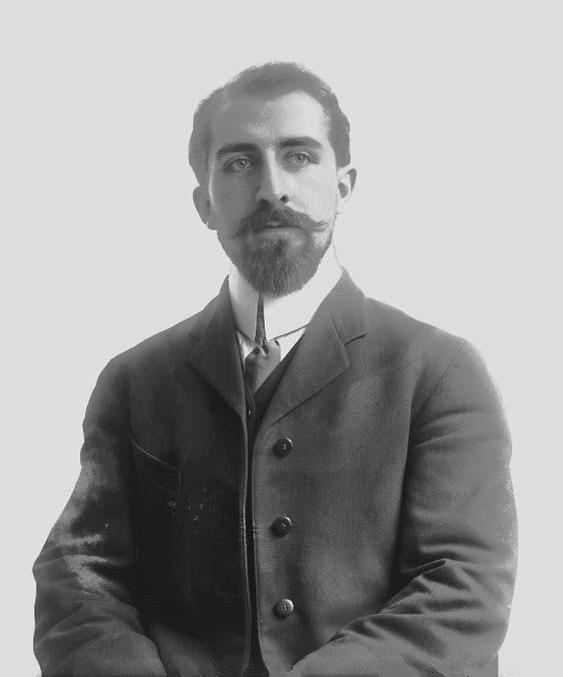
- Miffonis in 1908
- Born: 24 May 1882; Boulogne-Billancourt, France
- Died: 1955 (aged 72–73); Canada
- Education: Université de Paris
- Occupation: Civil engineer
- Known for: Plans and drawings for the Commission of Lighthouses

Henri de Miffonis (born Louis Fernand Henri de Miffonis; May 24, 1882 – 1955) was a French-Canadian civil engineer. He specialized in the construction of lighthouses, and studied civil engineering at the University of Paris. In 1905, after obtaining his diploma, he accepted an offer of employment with the Department of Fisheries and Oceans in Canada for work with the Commission des phares (Commission of Lighthouses), newly created. Miffonis' work was supervised by the Chief Engineer of the commission, William Patrick Anderson, a fervent promoter of reinforced concrete in the construction of lighthouses.

The recruitment of Miffonis, for his competence in the use of concrete, corresponded with an intense period of maritime infrastructure construction in Canada, and in particular, the construction of lighthouses. During the first three years of the commission, Miffonis developed and patented in 1908 plans for the design of tapered reinforced concrete lighthouses with flying buttresses.

The importance of Miffonis' role in the construction of Canadian lighthouses between 1908 and 1913 was underestimated until the rediscovery of his correspondence with Anderson. In 1913, Miffonis published a work presenting calculations showing the use of reinforced concrete and its advantages in the construction of lighthouses.

At the end of World War I, there was little construction of new lighthouses and Miffonis ended his career with Fisheries and Oceans Canada.

== Biography ==
=== Education and arrival in Canada ===
Miffonis was born in Boulogne-Billancourt, on 24 May 1882. He received his education at the University of Paris during a time when reinforced concrete was revolutionizing the building industry in France and was considered the leading edge in its use as a new material. Miffonis was profoundly influenced by this assessment and the use of reinforced concrete was a key element of his career.

In 1905, Miffonis joined the Canadian Department of Fisheries and Oceans as an engineer for the Commission des phares (Commission of Lighthouses). This commission was created in February 1904 to respond to pressure from shipowners asking the Canadian authorities to aid in navigation along the Canadian coasts. The Chief Engineer of the commission, William Patrick Anderson, was persuaded that reinforced concrete was the best choice for construction of future lighthouses in terms of solidity and costs.

The construction of the new lighthouses using reinforced concrete begins after the recruitment of Miffonis. The Assistant Chief Engineer, B. H. Fraser, mentioned that Miffonis was an educated man, possessing a grand culture and a great knowledge of mathematics and mechanics and one of the best theorists of the department. All of these qualities, as well as the needs of the Commission des phares, result in Miffonis being assigned to the head office of the commission in Ottawa rather than one of the regional offices. The hiring of the French engineer reassured the Department of Fisheries and Oceans about the use of reinforced concrete as a material for the construction of the new lighthouses erected at the beginning of the 20th century.

=== Career at the Commission de phares ===
The arrival of Miffonis corresponded to a prosperous period of construction of reinforced concrete lighthouses in Canada.

The initial forecast of the Commission de phares noted that fourteen towers had been constructed of reinforced concrete, but in the end, more than twenty-five lighthouses were constructed with the material between 1906 and 1914. The first five reinforced concrete lighthouses were built by the Steel Concrete Company of Montréal between 1906 and 1908, the company chosen because they possessed a great deal of expertise using concrete. The Department of Fisheries and Oceans was dependent on this firm to complete the towers in a reasonable timeframe.

The five reinforced concrete lighthouses constructed by the Steel Concrete Co. used plans from the Chief Engineer of the company, Emil Andrew Wallberg. Wallberg's plans called for round towers without buttresses. Their construction, along with Wallberg's plans, were a source of conflict with the Department of Fisheries and Oceans because the department preferred the lighthouses to be built using their own plans. The conflict escalated when Wallberg asked for a patent in May 1907 for the reinforced concrete round tower design, a request which the department contested in August on the basis of the refusal of Wallberg to use the plans furnished by the department. All the same, Wallberg obtained his patent in 1908. The department, however, obtained success in regard to the choice of the plans, as lighthouses being built from the end of 1908 were required to be constructed according to the department's directives using a mainly tapered form.

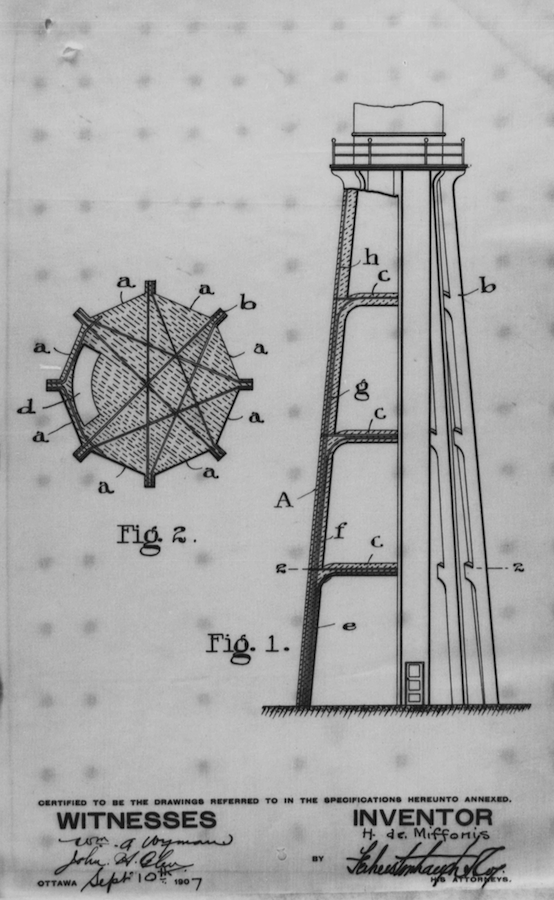
Plan of a reinforced concrete tower, patent application filed in 1907 by Miffonis.

Meanwhile, Miffonis applied for a patent for his plans of reinforced concrete lighthouses with flying buttresses in June 1907, about a month after the patent application of Wallberg. Miffonis' request described the physical characteristics of his model of a concrete tower and the differences between his plan and the models of concrete towers already patented; i.e., the presence of the flying buttresses placed at the ends of the prismatic tower and the presence of floors at the junction of the buttresses and the walls of the tower. There was also a description of the advantages of his model, i.e., a great solidity of the tower and a great resistance to lateral wind forces due to the flying buttresses as well as a reduction of the quantity of concrete needed for construction.

Miffonis' patent application was contested by Wallberg who accused the patent of using Wallberg's plans. However, Wallberg's claims were rejected by Miffonis and the Department of Fisheries and Oceans because Wallberg's plans never included flying buttresses. Miffonis obtained his Canadian patent on June 2, 1908. He also obtained a patent in the United States in 1910 for the same kind of reinforce concrete lighthouse with flying buttresses.

During the same period, a correspondence between Miffonis and William Patrick Anderson, Chief Engineer of the Department of Fisheries and Oceans, dated February 21, 1908, indicated that the French engineer was ready to renounce his rights in favor of the department to use his plans. This practice, then widespread, was used by government agencies to prevent companies from charging fees during construction. Two other correspondences, dated February 25, 1908 and March 20, 1908, between Miffonis and Anderson also demonstrate that the latter was irritated by the patent request of his subordinate, whom Anderson reminds that the plans of the towers would not have been possible without the advice Anderson had given Miffonis for the addition of floors and buttresses. But, it is also recognized in the two letters that the father of the concept was the French engineer.

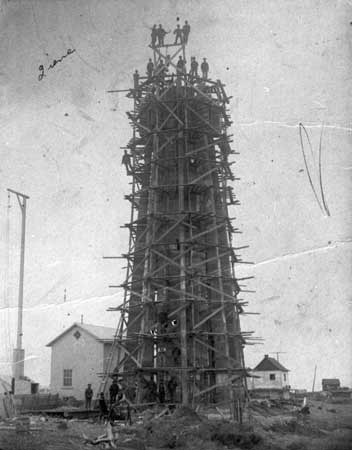
The construction of the lighthouse of Pointe-au-Père en 1909.

Between 1909 and 1911, Miffonis produced plans and supervised the construction of three of the tallest lighthouses with flying buttresses, i.e., in Pointe-au-Père, in île Caribou, and in Estevan Point. A total of nine lighthouses of this type were built under the auspices of Anderson. The expertise of Miffonis in the use of reinforced concrete was not limited to lighthouses. He also participated in the construction of a quay with this material at Pointe-du-Lac in 1909–1910, which is mentioned in an annual report of Anderson's in 1911.

In 1913, Miffonis published a work of three hundred pages with the title Béton et béton armé, aide-mémoire pratique à l'usage des ingénieurs, architectes, entrepreneurs et surveillants de travaux (Concrete and reinforced concrete, a practical checklist for engineers, architects, contractors, and supervisors). This treatice reports on Miffonis' work on the use of reinforced concrete as a building material and describes the characteristics of the concrete components as well as the properties of mortar. The book also addresses the subject of patented systems for the use of concrete and presents calculations and diagrams relating to its use. In a section specifically addressing lighthouses, Miffonis mentions the advantages using of concrete, a material resistant to vibration and easy to form to a desired shape. Miffonis' work made the use of concrete in France less empirical thanks to the introduction of more rigorous calculation standards.

Following Anderson's retirement in 1919, the economic downturn linked to the end of the First World War and the fact that the Canadian network of aids to navigation is now more complete, the functions of Miffonis were modified and few new lighthouses were built. Also in 1919, Miffonis applied for and obtained Canadian citizenship. Between 1921 and 1922, Miffonis, who then worked in the physics laboratories of Queen's University, carried out research on the optical qualities of various sources of lighting as well as on the reflective properties of certain materials likely to be used in lighthouses.

During this period, he published some scientific articles on his research in optics. In 1923, he published an article in the journal of the Franklin Institute titled The sense of verticality and its application to lighthouse work that dealt with construction of tall structures, their resistance to wind, as well as the level of visibility of such buildings for those who look for them, especially according to distance. The next year, he published an article in The Astrophysical Journal about the construction of a device called a periodoscope, which is used to measure the period of a repetition of an event in astronomy when there is a limited number of observations.

In 1925, he was assigned to the Dominion Lighthouse Depot, an organization responsible for the maintenance of lighthouses and marine infrastructure in Canada. Miffonis' work there was much more routine, and he no longer had to design plans for new lighthouse towers. Mifonis died in Canada in 1955.

== Legacy ==
=== Authorship of reinforced concrete lighthouse plans ===
According to historian Brigitte Violette, the authorship of reinforced concrete lighthouse plans constructed in Canada between 1908 and 1914 has been subject to different interpretations. Violette also mentions that the authors of the history of lighthouses of Canada have often attributed the concept of lighthouses with flying buttresses to Anderson. The confusion regarding the authorship of these plans may be attributed to the publication in 1913 of a work by Frederick A. Talbot, Lightships and Lighthouses, which was written with information provided by William Patrick Anderson and to whom was attributed the building of the reinforced concrete lighthouses. However, the patent application filed by Miffonis in 1907 for this type of tower was granted in 1908, and questions the authorship of Anderson concerning the reinforced concrete tower plans. Furthermore, the description provided by Talbot in 1913 of the advantages of this method of construction regarding resistance to lateral wind forces and the solidity of the tower makes up the explanatory text that Miffonis wrote in his patent application in 1907.

Historians that have written about Canadian lighthouses have limited the importance of Miffonis' role in the conception of lighthouses of the early 20th century to that of a "simple designer" by attributing their authorship to " inventive genius "of Anderson. However, historian Brigitte Violette indicates in her work published in 2009 for the 100th anniversiry of the lighthouse of Pointe-au-Père, that the correspondence exchanged between Anderson and Miffonis beginning in 1908, and in particular the two letters written by Anderson in February and March 1908, leaves little doubt that the authorship of the plans is that of the French engineer. Despite the irritation manifested by Anderson in these letters towards Miffonis, he nevertheless recognizes that the authorship of the concept is due to the latter. According to the historian Donald Graham, the irritation of Anderson may be related to "Anderson's bossy character and the iron fist with which he leads his team", as well as his desire to leave "a monument enabling himself to achieve international renown".

A better knowledge of the context and the documentation of the time makes it possible to say that the participation of Anderson in the plans of the reinforced concrete lighthouses at the beginning of the 20th century is rather related to the comments and proposals of modification he made to Miffonis and Wallberg's plans. Miffonis' theoretical knowledge of the use of reinforced concrete leaves little doubt as to the importance of his participation in the erection of lighthouses at the beginning of the 20th century in Canada and to the fact that he is much more than a simple designer working for the Department of Fisheries and Oceans.

=== Lighthouses constructed according to the plans of Miffonis ===
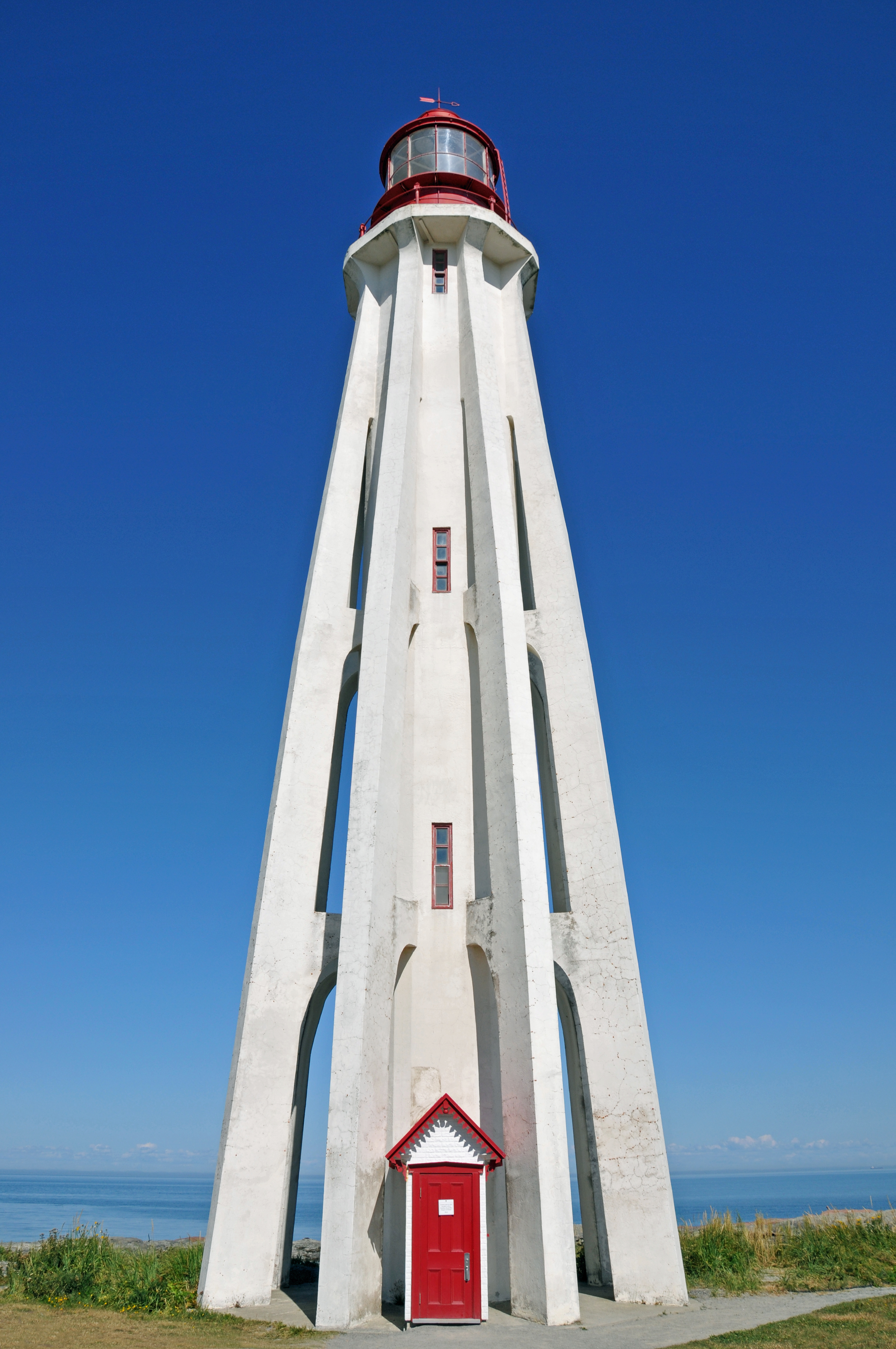
The octagonal reinforced concrete tower of the Pointe-au-Père Lighthouse with flying buttresses

Along with the lighthouses of Pointe-au-Père, île Caribou, and Estevan Point, nine of the lighthouses constructed between 1906 and 1914 were constructed with the patented design of Miffonis, i.e., a prismatic form and a tower that is hexagonal or octagonal featuring flying buttresses. This architecture seems to have been reserved for the tallest constructions, all carried out between 1906 and 1912. It was not used thereafter although Anderson considered the concrete achievements to be "the ultimate completion in the art of building lighthouses".

Other types of lighthouses were constructed by the Commission des phares according to the plans of Miffonis. The ten towers of less than 18.5 meters, built between 1908 and 1914, are of a "more sober" form, without buttress, providing a prismatic form over the entire length of the barrel: the lighthouses of Flint Island in Nova Sotia (1908–1910), of the île Parisienne in Ontario (1912), of Point Atkinson, Sheringham and Langara Point in British Columbia (1912–1913), of New Ferolle in Newfoundland (1913), and of Natashquan and île Sainte-Marie in Québec (1913–1914).

In his 1913 book, Miffonis states that these lighthouses, although less spectacular than those with flying buttresses, are much easier to build. The "less spectacular" aspect of these lighthouse towers explains the "little controversy as to their design" as noted by historian Brigitte Violette.

In addition, Miffonis drew more conventional lighthouse plans, in particular that of Cap-Chat built in 1909. The quadrangular structure is framed by four concrete pillars connected by wooden walls bent at the top by steel beams. The plaster which was originally intended to cover the walls was instead covered with a facing of clapboard.

Canadian lighthouses constructed with reinforced concrete and flying buttresses
| Location | Year of Construction | Shape and buttress | Height (meters) | Condition and status |
|---|---|---|---|---|
| Point northwest of Belle Isle in Newfoundland | 1908 | Hexagonal with 6 flying buttresses | 12 | Still existing. Recognized by the Federal Heritage Buildings Review Office (FHBRO) in 1989. |
| Cape Anguille in Newfoundland | 1907-10 | Hexagonal with 6 flying buttresses | 28.5 | Demolished in 1980. |
| Pointe-au-Père in Québec | 1909 | Octagonal with 8 flying buttresses | 31.8 | Still existing. Classified by the FHBRO in 1990. Recognized national historic site of Canada in 1974. |
| Estevan Point in British Columbia | 1909 | Octagonal with 8 flying buttresses | 29.3 | Still existing. Classified by the FHBRO in 1991. |
| Cape Norman in Newfoundland | 1910 | Hexagonal with 6 flying buttresses | 16 | Demolished in 1963. |
| Cape Bauld in Newfoundland | 1910 | Hexagonal with 6 flying buttresses | 24.4 | Demolished near 1960. |
| Île Caribou, Lake Superior in Ontario | 1910 | Hexagonal with 6 flying buttresses | 30.5 | Still existing. Classified by the FHBRO in 1990. |
| Michipicoten Island, Lake Superior in Ontario | 1911 | Hexagonal with 6 flying buttresses | 20.8 | Still existing. Classified by the FHBRO in 1990. |
| Escarpement Bagot, Anticosti Island in Québec | 1912 | Hexagonal with 6 flying buttresses | 23.5 | Still existing. Classified by the FHBRO in 1990. |

== Publications ==
- Béton et béton armé, aide-mémoire pratique à l'usage des ingénieurs, architectes, entrepreneurs et surveillants de travaux published in Paris by H. Ferreyrol, 1913

== See also ==
- List of lighthouses in Canada
- History of lighthouses in Canada

== Bibliography ==
- Violette, Brigitte; Godbout, Léïc (2009). La station d'aide à la navigation de Pointe-au-Père et son phare de béton armé : centenaire d'une construction audacieuse, 1909-2009. Québec: Parcs Canada. ISBN 9781100920429.
