= Ile Parisienne Light =

Lighthouse in Ile Parisienne, Ontario, Canada

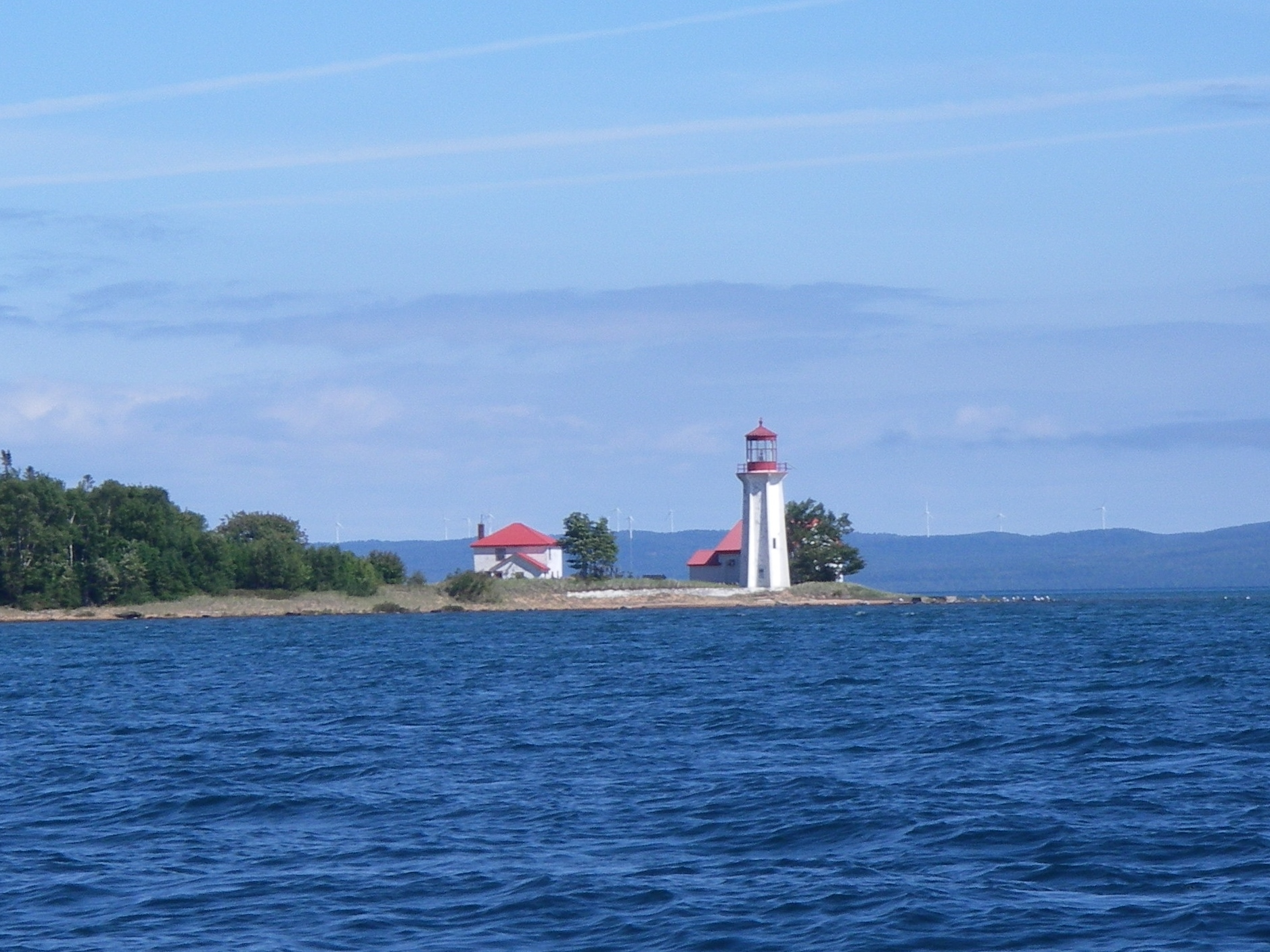
- Ile Parisienne Light - Northern side
- Location: Ile Parisienne; Ontario; Canada
- Coordinates: 46°38′43″N 84°43′26.4″W

Tower
- Constructed: 1911
- Construction: concrete tower
- Height: 16.6 metres (54 ft)
- Shape: hexagonal tower with balcony and lantern
- Markings: white tower, red lantern
- Power source: solar power
- Heritage: recognized federal heritage building of Canada

Light
- Focal height: 16.1 metres (53 ft)
- Lens: modern optic, emergency, seasonal
- Range: 25.75 kilometres (16.00 mi)
- Characteristic: Fl W 10s.

The Ile Parisienne Light was built in 1911 on the southern tip of remote Ile Parisienne in the middle of Whitefish Bay on Lake Superior on a major shipping lane for ingress/egress to the Soo Locks. It is now a well-known landmark to shipping traffic and pleasure craft. The light is automated and remains seasonally active.

== Construction ==
The Ile Parisienne Light Station was established on the southern tip of the Ile Parisienne in 1911 after construction of the Soo Locks increased upper Great Lakes shipping traffic and the need for navigational aids. The white tower is a well-known landmark to lake traffic and pleasure craft. The tower's cast-in place concrete, hexagonal structure was built with 6 tapered exterior wall buttresses, flared ribs at the platform, a gable roofed entrance, small windows, and a prominent, 10-sided, red lantern topped with a beaver weathervane. It is considered a good example of early modern, functional design.

== History ==
The first recorded shipwreck on Lake Superior was off Ile Parisienne. During a fur trading feud in August 1816, Lord Selkirk ordered the arrest of key Northwest Company leaders at Fort William. Selkirk sent the arrested Northwesters by Montreal canoe to eastern Canada for trial. The canoe commanded by Lieutenant Fauche capsized off Ile Parisienne drowning, by varying reports, 9 or ll people.

At least one shipwreck and the rescue of one castaway near the island shores is owed to the light station's location in the middle of Whitefish Bay on the major shipping lane upbound and downbound from the Soo Locks. The steamship Panther sank 26 June 1916, following a collision during fog with the James H. Hill, off Parisienne Island in Whitefish Bay, with no loss of life. When the steamship Myron sank 23 November 1919, the Vermilion lifesaving crew searched Lake Superior in a raging gale for survivors all the way from their station to Ile Parisienne, but found nothing. The captain of the Myron was rescued 20 hours afterward, found near death drifting on wreckage near Ile Parisienne, his clothes frozen to his body. In July 1920, three bodies washed ashore Ile Parisienne from the shipwreck John Owen that foundered off Stannard Rock on 12 November 1919. The bodies were buried on Ile Parisienne.

Life at the Ile Parisienne Light Station was lonely and perilous. On April 18, 1922, the small Canadian buoy tender Lambton set out to deliver the lighthouse keepers for the upcoming shipping season to Caribou Island, Michipicoten Island, and Ile Parisienne in Lake Superior. The Lambton disappeared during a heavy northeast gale on Whitefish Bay on April 19, 1922, taking the lives of all 16 hands and 5 lighthouse keepers, including John Douglas, Ile Parisienne lighthouse keeper, and his assistant keeper, John Kay.

== Heritage site ==
The Ile Parisienne light tower was listed on the Canadian Register of Historic Places in 1991 as "a Recognized Federal Heritage building because of its historical associations, and its architectural and environmental values." The light station is owned by the Canadian Coast Guard. The light is now a seasonal, automated, solar powered modern optic. The light is not open to the public because it is located in an area of very high volume shipping traffic and it is considered a critical aid to navigation. The light can be viewed by boat or plane tours.

The light tower of Ile Parisienne was petitioned for designation as a Heritage Lighthouse of Canada on or before 29 May 2015.

== See also ==
- Henri de Miffonis
- List of lighthouses in Ontario
- List of lighthouses in Canada
