= Cape Bauld =

Headland on Quirpon Island, Canada

Location of Cape Bauld in Newfoundland

Cape Bauld is a headland located at the northernmost point of Quirpon Island, an island just northeast of the Great Northern Peninsula of Newfoundland in the Canadian province of Newfoundland and Labrador.

Cape Bauld, slightly north and east of Cape Norman, delineates the eastern end of the Strait of Belle Isle.

The English explorer John Cabot may have landed at Cape Bauld on June 24, 1497, though Cape Bonavista is also mentioned as a potential landing point. Cape Bauld is only some nine kilometers (5.6 miles) northeast of the verified Viking archeological site, the L'Anse aux Meadows coastal location, dating to five centuries earlier than Cabot's date of achievement.

== Lighthouse ==
Cape Bauld Lighthouse
- Location: Cape Bauld; Quirpon Island; Newfoundland; Canada
- Coordinates: 51°36′24.4″N 55°25′38.4″W

Tower
- Constructed: 1884 (first)
- Foundation: concrete base
- Construction: wooden tower (first) concrete tower (current)
- Height: 14.6 metres (48 ft)
- Shape: quadrangular tower (first) octagonal truncated tower with balcony and lantern (current)
- Markings: with tower, red lantern
- Operator: Canadian Coast Guard
- Heritage: recognized federal heritage building of Canada

Light
- First lit: 1962 (current)
- Deactivated: 1962 (first)
- Focal height: 54 metres (177 ft)
- Range: 17 nautical miles (31 km; 20 mi)
- Characteristic: Fl W 15s.

A lighthouse was constructed at the cape in 1884. The current lighthouse is the second replacement structure, constructed 1960–1961. The lightkeeper's residence is from 1920.

== See also ==
- List of lighthouses in Canada
- Henri de Miffonis
