= Caribou Island Lighthouse =

Lighthouse on Lake Superior, Canada

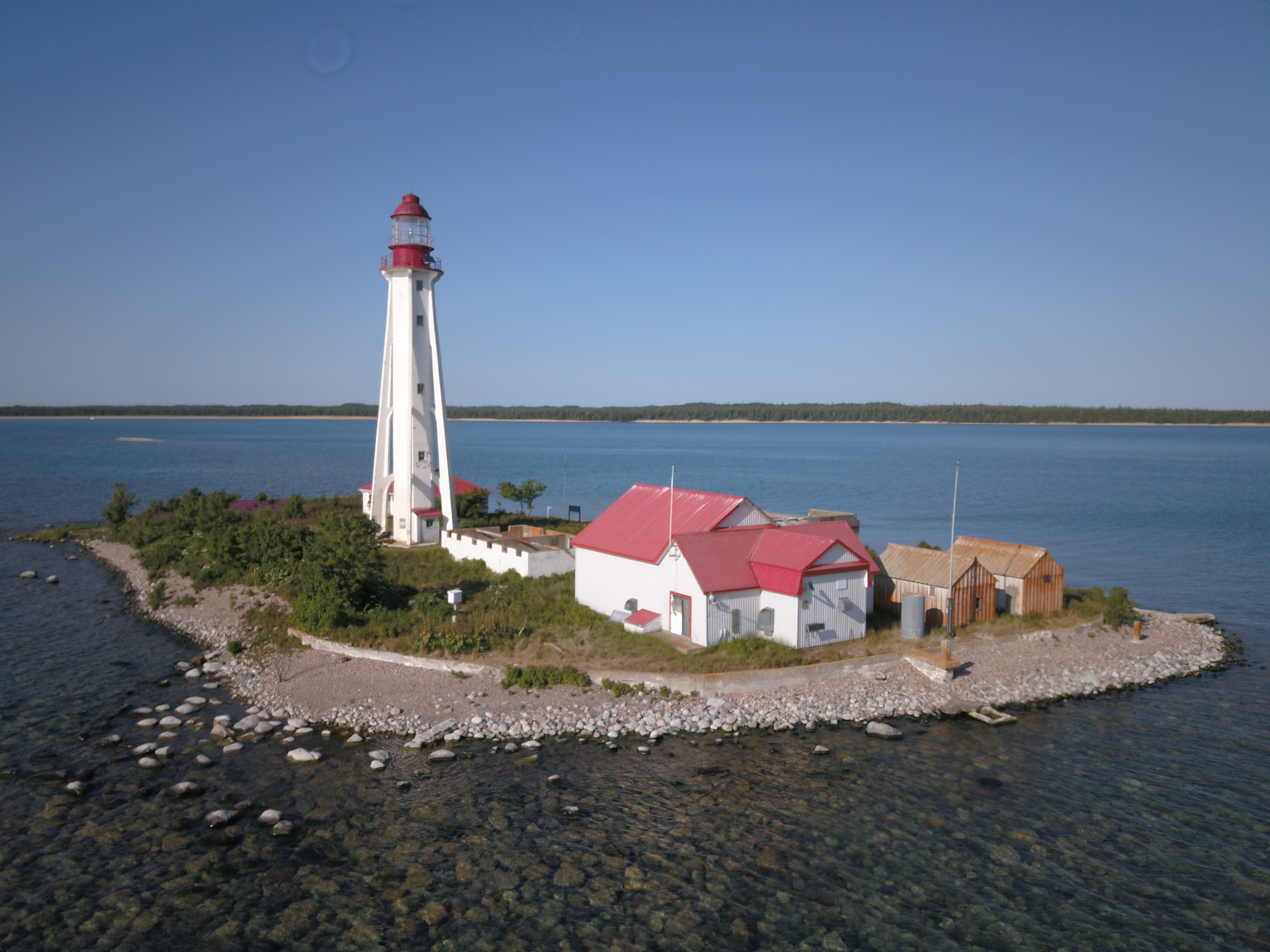
- Caribou Island Lighthouse, August 2019
- Location: Caribou Island; Lake Superior; Ontario; Canada
- Coordinates: 47°20′23.1″N 85°49′33.1″W

Tower
- Constructed: 1886 (first)
- Construction: concrete tower
- Automated: mid-1970
- Height: 31.5 metres (103 ft)
- Shape: hexagonal tapered tower with six flying buttresses, balcony and lantern
- Markings: white tower, red balcony and lantern
- Power source: solar power
- Operator: Canadian Coast Guard
- Heritage: classified federal heritage building of Canada

Light
- First lit: 1912 (current)
- Focal height: 30 metres (98 ft)
- Lens: second order Fresnel lens by Chance Brothers
- Characteristic: Fl W 15s.

Caribou Island Lighthouse sits on the uninhabited Caribou Island in the eastern end of Lake Superior, 22 miles (35 km) south of Michipicoten Island. It lies entirely within the territorial waters of Canada although only about three miles from the international border between Canada and the United States. It is approximately 3 miles (4.8 km) long and approximately 1 mile (1.6 km) wide.

A dangerous reef stretches 1 mile (1.6 km) along the north and west shores of Caribou Island, and a shallow reef 2.5 miles (4.0 km) stretches beyond to the southwest to Caribou Island, lying only 11 feet (3.4 m) below the lake's surface. The unmanned lighthouse, which is owned by the Canadian Coast Guard, is located on a tiny adjacent island called Lighthouse Island a few hundred feet across and positioned 1 mile (1.6 km) west of the southern tip of the main island. When originally built, it was visible for 16 miles (26 km) and operated on a 30-second revolving cycle. Caribou Island is about 55 km (34 mi) off Agawa Bay on the east shore of the lake.

== History ==
The present light was built in 1912 (station established 1886), flashes white every 15 seconds and is 31.5 meters (103 feet) tall. It is a hexagonal concrete tower with six flying buttresses. The structure is painted white, while the lantern, gallery and watch room are red. The lighthouse is located on a small island southwest of Caribou Island itself and about 5 km (3.1 mi) north of the international border. It is only accessible by boat or floatplane via a shallow, rocky harbour on the east side, or by helicopter via a landing area on the north side.

== Keepers ==
- R. May 1886 – 1887
- Charles James Pim 1887–1898
- Wilbrod O. Demers 1899–1906
- Antoine Boucher 1907–1912
- George W. Johnston 1912–1921
- J. George Penfold 1921–1922
- John W. Kennedy 1922–1928
- Charles N. McDonald 1928–1935
- Arthur W. Hurley 1935–1962
- Alfred Thibeault 1962–1964
- George Rutherford 1964–?
- Reg Dawson (at least 1968)
- Bert Hopkins

== See also ==
- List of lighthouses in Ontario
- List of lighthouses in Canada
- Henri de Miffonis
