= Ile Parisienne =

Island in Ontario, Canada

Coordinates: 46.68594°N 84.72986°W

Ile Parisienne is an uninhabited island in the province of Ontario in Canada. It is located in Whitefish Bay in Lake Superior. Its name is derived from French and means "Parisian island". The Ile Parisienne Light located on the southern tip of the island is a critical aid to navigation on a major shipping lane in Lake Superior. The lighthouse was designated a Recognized Federal Heritage Building in 1991 and it is on the petitioned list for designation as a Heritage Lighthouse of Canada. The Ile Parisienne Conservation Reserve was created in 2001 to protect the island's pristine geology, habitat, and wildlife.

== Ile Parisienne Conservation Reserve ==
Ile Parisienne Conservation Reserve
- IUCN category II (national park)
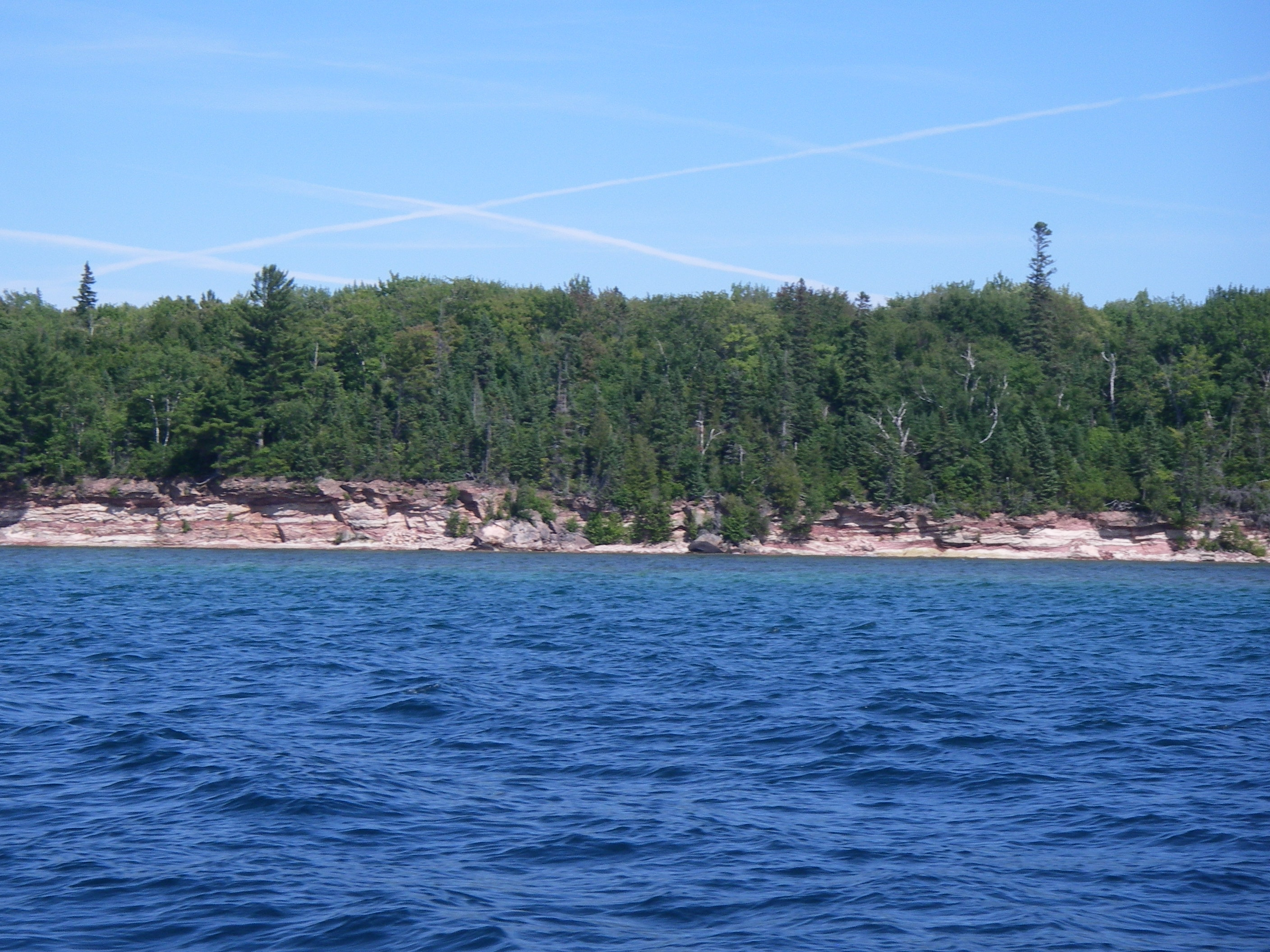
- Ile Parisienne sandstone cliffs on western side
- Interactive map of Ile Parisienne Conservation Reserve
- Location: Whitefish Bay, Ontario, Canada
- Nearest city: Sault Ste. Marie, Ontario
- Area: 911 ha (2,250 acres)
- Established: 2001
- Governing body: Ministry of Natural Resources

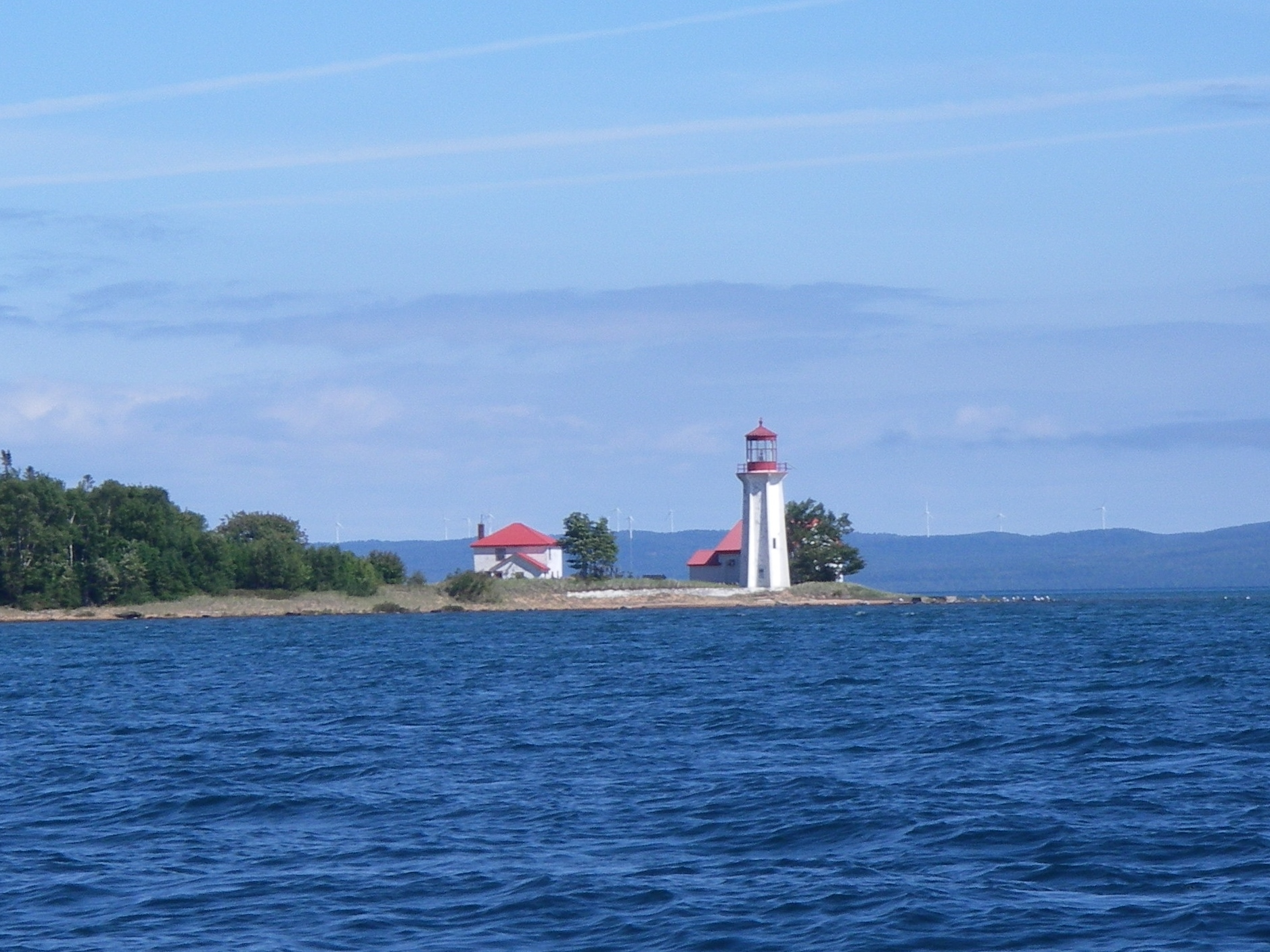
Ile Parisienne Light - northern side

Ile Parisienne is located at the eastern end of Lake Superior in the middle of Whitefish Bay about 25 km (16 mi) northwest of Sault Ste. Marie, Ontario. The island is 911 hectares (2,250 acres) in area, 8 km (5.0 mi) long from north to south and 1.6 km (0.99 mi) at its widest point.

The Ile Parisienne Conservation Reserve was created by the Ontario Public Lands Act of 2001 to protect Ile Parisienne. The reserve encompasses the entire pristine island except a privately owned 46 ha (110 acres) tract at the southeast end and the southwest end where the lighthouse is located. The reserve includes a 1.6 km (0.99 mi) marine zone extending from the shore into Whitefish Bay.

The reserve's geology comprises Pre-Cambrian age Jacobsville Sandstone bedrock outcrops, postglacial raised beaches of sand and cobble, vegetated sand dunes, and unique boulder lags. The reserve protects spawning areas for lake trout and whitefish, feeding, nesting, and breeding habitat for waterfowl, raptors, and migrating birds. It also protects various wetland complexes and a super-canopy approaching old-growth status of white pine, black spruce, balsam fir, and white birch.

The reserve is managed by the Ontario Ministry of Natural Resources. There are no resource access roads. Private and commercial use is prohibited and no land permits have been issued. Scientific research is encouraged if it is conducted by qualified individuals or institutions. Any change in the reserve's land use is subject to a "Test of Compatibility" with Crown Land Use Policy.

In 2010, Fisheries and Oceans Canada declared almost 1000 Canadian lighthouses as surplus under the new Heritage Lighthouse Protection Act. The Ile Parisienne Light was petitioned for designation as a Heritage Lighthouse of Canada on or before 29 May 2015.
