= Belle Isle Northeast Light =

- Location: Belle Isle between Newfoundland and Labrador; Canada
- Coordinates: 52°00′50.2″N 55°16′50.2″W

Tower
- Constructed: 1905
- Construction: concrete tower
- Height: 27 metres (89 ft)
- Shape: dodecagonal tower with six flying buttress
- Markings: white tower, red lantern
- Power source: solar power
- Operator: Canadian Coast Guard
- Heritage: recognized federal heritage building of Canada
- Fog signal: Horn(1) 30s

Light
- Focal height: 42 metres (138 ft)
- Range: 17 nmi (31 km; 20 mi)
- Characteristic: Fl W 11s.

Belle Isle Northeast Light is a 27-metre (89 ft) tall, 12-sided flying buttress lighthouse located on Belle Isle, Newfoundland, which was built in 1905. It is one of three lighthouses on the island and was maintained by the Canadian Government despite the fact that Newfoundland did not join Confederation until 1949. It was designed by William P. Anderson as one in a series of nine buttressed lighthouses built in Canada around 1910.

Its light characteristic is a white flash occurring every eleven seconds. The lightsource is placed at a focal plane of 42 metres (138 ft) above sea level. A fog signal consisting of a single blast may be sounded every 30 seconds if needed.

== See also ==
- List of lighthouses in Newfoundland and Labrador
- List of lighthouses in Canada
