= Quirpon Island =

Island in Newfoundland and Labrador, Canada

Coordinates: 51°36′36″N 55°26′08″W

Quirpon Island is an island off the northeastern tip of Newfoundland's Great Northern Peninsula in the province of Newfoundland and Labrador, Canada. The island is 6.5 km long from north to south and has a maximum width of 3 km.

It is located at the southeastern edge of the Strait of Belle Isle, south of Belle Isle. Cape Bauld is located at its northeastern point. The haunting Isle of Demons legend originates from here.

== Lighthouse Inn ==
Quirpon Island is currently a tourist attraction, that is privately owned and serves as an inn (the lighthouse is owned by the Government of Canada). The inn has two buildings that can accommodate tourists, as well as a lighthouse and a few other buildings.
