= Caribou Island (near Michipicoten Island) =

Island in Canada

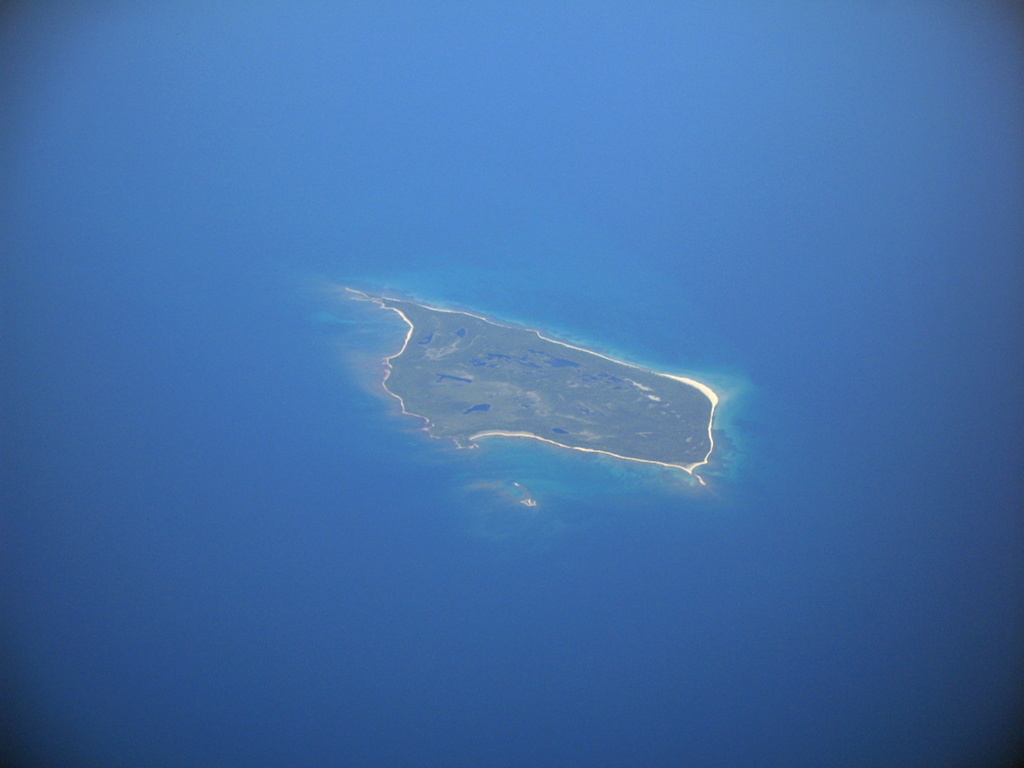
- Interactive map of Caribou Island

Geography
- Location: Lake Superior
- Coordinates: 47°21′33″N 85°48′36″W

Administration
- Canada
- Territory: Ontario

Demographics
- Population: 0

Caribou Island is an uninhabited island in the eastern end of Lake Superior, 40 kilometres (25 mi) south of Michipicoten Island. It lies entirely within the territorial waters of Canada although only about five kilometres from the international border between Canada and the United States. It is approximately 5.6 kilometres (3.5 mi) long and 2.4 kilometres (1.5 mi) wide, and 1,600 acres (647 ha) in area. The interior is low scrub and bog with small lakes, including Little Italy, Hambone, and Deer Lake among many unnamed ones. Several of the lakes are maintained by beavers and all are several feet above Lake Superior.

== History ==
Canadians first went to Caribou Island around 1820 when nearly 400 acres of the islands 1,600 acres were found to have large deposits of bird guano. At the time this was an important part in making gunpowder and would be for nearly five years a primary source of saltpeter for the Ontario powder works in 1852.The reef around Caribou island made travel difficult for many merchants and harvesters moving from Michipicoten Island.

Caribou Island was considered for an emergency landing airport (YCI) during World War II but it was never built because of the proximity of the twin cities of Sault Ste. Marie, Michigan, and Sault Ste. Marie, Ontario, only about 80–90 miles SE. However an interior lake, Deer Lake on the center East side of the island, was used as an Amphibian base with a dock and ramp built by the last private owners of the island because of the unpredictable water/wave condition of Lake Superior. A small three room cabin was built on the east shore of Lake Superior adjacent to Deer Lake and the Amphibian base.

The island was privately held by a group of hunters and stocked with caribou in the late 1800s. It was considered a private hunting preserve through the early 1900s. The caribou were very aggressive, treeing the lighthouse keeper for hours on several occasions. It is rumored that the light house keepers poached caribou and beaver. One winter, in the 1920s, the caribou walked off the island when the lake froze over. Because of the Great Depression, the island was not restocked and the island was more or less abandoned by the approximately 15 owners-in-common. The island was acquired completely by the Roys A. Ellis family in the 1960s and was transferred to the Mellon Conservancy Trust of the Andrew W. Mellon Foundation in the early 1980s to never be developed. In 2018 six caribou were moved to Caribou Island from Michipicoten Island to the north, due to pressure from Michipicoten First Nation.

== Geology ==
According to the available information, Caribou Island consists of a mixture of glacial sediments and Precambrian sandstone. Caribou Island is part of a large glacial moraine that accumulated south of Michipicoten Island. In addition, exposures of gently dipping, friable Jacobsville Sandstone, have been reported from Caribou Island. The Jacobsville Sandstone is the uppermost and youngest layer comprising about 8 kilometers (5.0 mi) of sandstone and conglomerate that underlies Lake Superior and fills the upper part of the Lake Superior segment of the Midcontinent Rift. These sedimentary strata overlie an additional 22 kilometers (14 mi) of basaltic volcanic strata and mafic intrusions that fill the remainder of the Midcontinental Rift.

== Navigation hazards ==
A dangerous reef known as "Six Fathom Shoal" stretches more than 1 mile (1.6 km) north of the north point of the island, and is rumored to be the one the SS Edmund Fitzgerald shoaled on prior to sinking. A shallow reef 2.5 miles (4.0 km) to the southwest of Caribou Island Lighthouse lies only 11 feet (3.4 m) below the lake's surface. The now unmanned lighthouse which is owned by the Canadian Coast Guard is located on a tiny adjacent island called Lighthouse Island a few hundred feet across and positioned 1 mile (1.6 km) west of the southern tip of the island. When originally built, it was visible for 16 miles (26 km) and operated on a 30-second revolving cycle.

These reefs are not coral reefs. Instead they consist of bedrock ridges and interfluves that lie between northerly trending bedrock valleys, which are known as tunnel valleys. These tunnel valleys were excavated by subglacial meltwater at the base of the Laurentide Ice Sheet along pre-existing fractures and joints that exist within the bedrock floor of Lake Superior. Samples dredged from a shoal northwest of Caribou Island and close to one of these valleys resemble Jacobsville Sandstone. The lateral continuity and consistent and parallel direction of the tunnel valleys indicated that they are carved from friable sandstones that underlies the floor of most of eastern Lake Superior.
