= Pointe-au-Père Lighthouse =

Lighthouse in Quebec, Canada

Pointe-au-Père
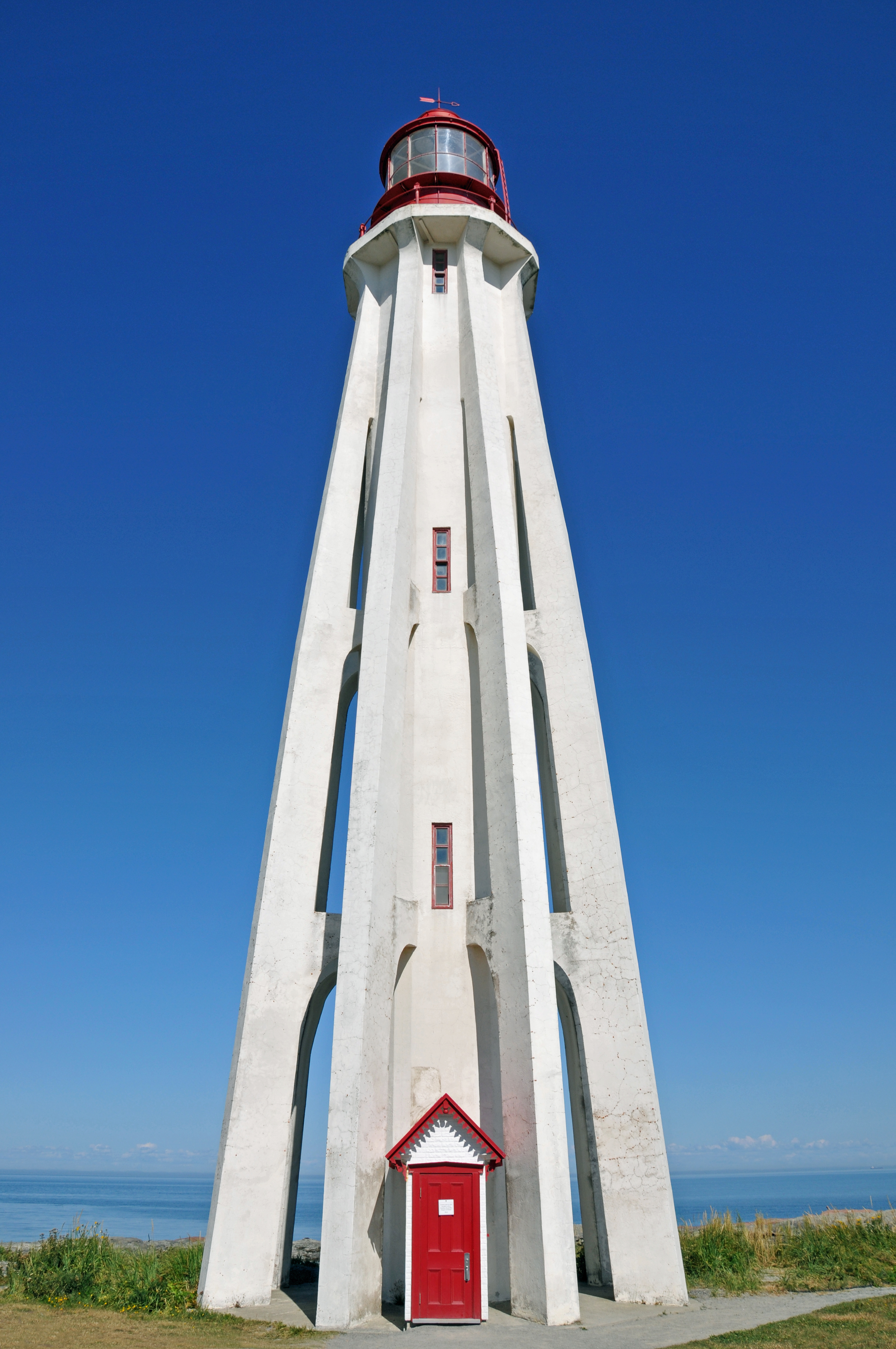
- Pointe-au-Père Lighthouse
- Location: Rimouski; Quebec; Canada
- Coordinates: 48°31′03″N 68°28′07″W

Tower
- Constructed: 1859 (first)
- Construction: concrete tower
- Automated: 1975
- Height: 108 feet (33 m)
- Shape: sixteen-sided cylinder with eight buttresses tower
- Markings: white tower, red lantern and balcony
- Heritage: classified federal heritage building of Canada

Light
- First lit: 1909 (current)
- Deactivated: 1975
- Lens: Third order Fresnel
- Range: 22 nmi (41 km; 25 mi)

National Historic Site of Canada
- Official name: Pointe-au-Père Lighthouse National Historic Site of Canada
- Designated: 1974

The 3rd Pointe-Au-Père Lighthouse was built in 1909 in the city of Pointe-au-Père, near Rimouski, Quebec, Canada. This city was well known in naval circles as the location of the pilot station for the Bas-Saint-Laurent (lower St. Lawrence) zone. Pointe-au-Père has since been amalgamated into the larger city of Rimouski (2002).

The first lighthouse on the site, a wooden octagonal tower, was built in 1859 to guide boats through the difficult St. Lawrence River at a cost of $1,453.61. The Government of Canada purchased the lighthouse in 1861. The first lighthouse burnt down in a fire 13 April, 1867, and was replaced by a newer lighthouse the same year. The second lighthouse would remain as a residence and office on the site until being demolished in 1966.

The third lighthouse is 108 feet (33 m) tall, which makes it the second tallest in Canada. It is built in a characteristic shape, employing eight concrete buttresses to support a slender central cylinder. Ownership of the lighthouse was transferred to Parks Canada in 1977. Improvements for the sake of conservation were made in 1979.

An automated skeleton tower was constructed nearby in 1975 and remained in operation until the station was closed in 1997. The site is now open for visitors as part of the Site historique maritime de la Pointe-au-Père. The RMS Empress of Ireland shipwrecking, which sunk off the coast of Pointe-au-Père in 1914, is documented in the adjacent Empress of Ireland museum. Visitors can also see the first submarine open to the public in Canada, HMCS Onondaga (S73) at the same location.

The site was designated a National Historic Site in 1974, and is considered a unit of the national park system. However, visitor services are provided by the non-profit Point-au-Père Maritime Historic Site.

== Keepers ==
- David Lawson 1859-1876
- John McWilliams 1876-1893
- John McWilliams 1893-1911
- John Cahill 1912-1920
- Thomas Matthew Wyatt 1920-1936
- Charles Augustus Lavoie 1936-1964
- Roger St. Pierre Lavoie 1964-1972
- Armand Lafrance 1972-?

== See also ==
- List of lighthouses in Canada
- Henri de Miffonis
