= Estevan Point Lighthouse =

Lighthouse on the west coast of Vancouver Island, Canada

Estevan Point lighthouse
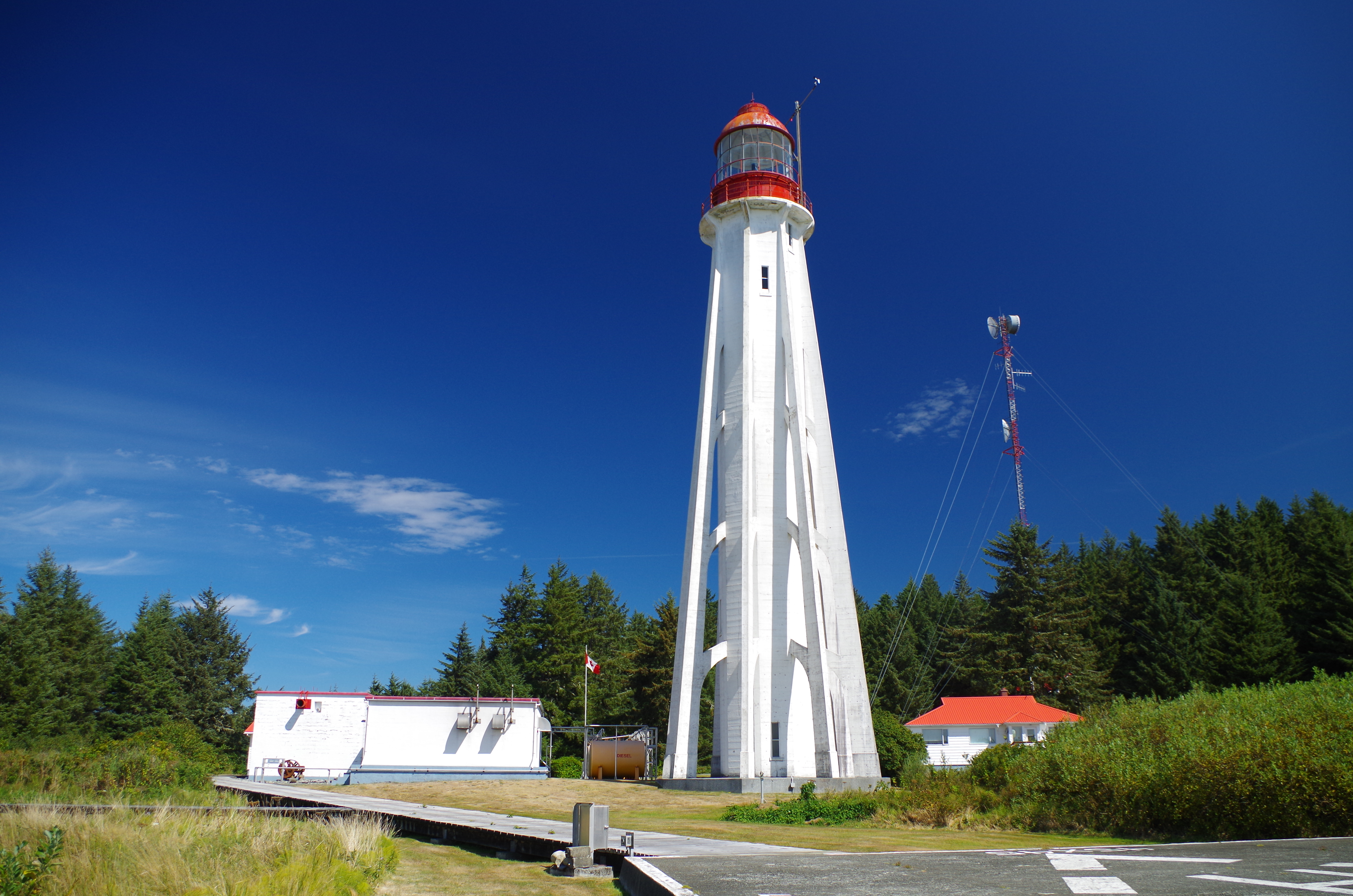
- Location: Vancouver Island, Hesquiat Peninsula, Estevan Point, Alberni–Clayoquot Regional District, Canada
- Coordinates: 49°22′59″N 126°32′39″W

Tower
- Construction: concrete (tower)
- Height: 30 m (98 ft)
- Shape: octagonal tower with buttresses
- Markings: White (tower), red (lantern)
- Operator: Canadian Coast Guard
- Heritage: classified federal heritage building of Canada, heritage lighthouse

Light
- First lit: 1909
- Focal height: 37 m (121 ft)
- Lens: First order Fresnel by Chance Brothers (original), modern optic (current)
- Range: 17 nmi (31 km; 20 mi)
- Characteristic: Fl(2) W 15s

Estevan Point Lighthouse is on the headland of the same name in the Hesquiat Peninsula Provincial Park on the west coast of Vancouver Island, Canada.

During the Second World War, in 1942, the Estevan Point Lighthouse was fired upon by the Japanese submarine I-26, marking the first enemy attack on Canadian soil since the Fenian raids of 1866 and 1871.

The Canadian Coast Guard still maintains Estevan Point, with the light still active as of 2022. The light emits a double flash every 15 seconds with the focal plane at 37.5 m (123 ft) above sea level.

== History ==
The Spanish explorer Juan José Pérez Hernández, a native of Mallorca, traded with the natives of the region (the Nuu-chah-nulth) when he explored the area in 1774 and named the headland "Punta San Esteban". Four years later, James Cook's expedition arrived in the Nootka Sound and made contact with the local population.

The lighthouse was established in 1909 as one in a series of buttressed lighthouses designed by engineer William P. Anderson. The lighthouse was constructed in concrete as a 30.5 m (100 ft) tall octagonal tower supported by buttresses. Originally, a first-order Fresnel lens made by Chance Brothers of England was used. It, along with the lantern, was dismantled during the 1980s and was then donated to a regional museum in 2004.

=== Estevan Point Lighthouse attack ===
During the Second World War, the Estevan Point Lighthouse was attacked by the Japanese submarine I-26. On June 20, 1942, I-26, under the command of Yokota Minoru, surfaced and shelled the lighthouse, while the Japanese submarine I-25 made a similar attack at the mouth of the Columbia River, Oregon, shelling Fort Stevens.

I-26 fired 25–30 rounds of 5.5 in (140 mm) shells at the Estevan Point Lighthouse and radio-direction-finding station, but failed to hit its target and the lighthouse station remained undamaged. Five Royal Canadian Navy patrol vessels and a Supermarine Stranraer, a flying boat of the Royal Canadian Air Force, were dispatched to search for the submarine but failed to locate I-26 which fled north and then returned to Japan. One of the 5.5-inch shells was recovered by a naval shore patrol after the attack while additional shell fragments were found in 1973. An explosive demolition team from CFB Comox destroyed one explosive fragment while an inert fragment was presented to the Maritime Museum of British Columbia. Although the attack resulted in no damage or casualties, the subsequent decision to turn off the lights of outer stations caused difficulties for coastal shipping.

A 1995 episode of the CBC Television newsmagazine program The Fifth Estate reported contradictions in eyewitness descriptions of the attacking vessel and speculated that the attack may have been a false flag conducted by Allied surface vessels with the intent of increasing domestic support for Prime Minister Mackenzie King and his wartime policies related to conscription.

== Climate ==
Estevan Point has an oceanic climate (Köppen Cfb). The average annual temperature in Estevan Point is 9.9 °C (49.8 °F). The average annual rainfall is 3,097.0 mm (121.93 in) with November as the wettest month. The temperatures are highest on average in August, at around 14.9 °C (58.8 °F), and lowest in December / January, at around 5.9 °C (42.6 °F). The highest temperature ever recorded in Estevan Point was 30.5 °C (86.9 °F) on June 28, 2021, during the Western North America heat wave; the coldest temperature ever recorded was −13.9 °C (7.0 °F) on January 14, 1950.

Climate data for Estevan Point WMO ID: 71894; coordinates 49°23′00″N 126°32′35″W; elevation: 5.8 m (19 ft); 1991–2020 normals, extremes 1908–present
Month	Jan	Feb	Mar	Apr	May	Jun	Jul	Aug	Sep	Oct	Nov	Dec	Year
Record high humidex	14.2	16.1	18.8	22.5	24.2	29.6	31.0	28.1	32.4	24.1	18.1	14.9	32.4
Record high °C (°F)	17.2 (63.0)	17.2 (63.0)	21.0 (69.8)	22.0 (71.6)	26.0 (78.8)	30.5 (86.9)	28.9 (84.0)	27.5 (81.5)	26.5 (79.7)	21.1 (70.0)	22.0 (71.6)	15.0 (59.0)	30.5 (86.9)
Mean daily maximum °C (°F)	8.2 (46.8)	8.6 (47.5)	9.5 (49.1)	11.4 (52.5)	14.0 (57.2)	15.8 (60.4)	17.4 (63.3)	17.8 (64.0)	16.7 (62.1)	13.2 (55.8)	10.2 (50.4)	8.2 (46.8)	12.6 (54.7)
Daily mean °C (°F)	5.9 (42.6)	6.0 (42.8)	6.7 (44.1)	8.4 (47.1)	11.1 (52.0)	13.1 (55.6)	14.6 (58.3)	14.9 (58.8)	13.7 (56.7)	10.6 (51.1)	7.6 (45.7)	5.9 (42.6)	9.9 (49.8)
Mean daily minimum °C (°F)	3.6 (38.5)	3.2 (37.8)	3.7 (38.7)	5.3 (41.5)	8.1 (46.6)	10.3 (50.5)	11.8 (53.2)	12.1 (53.8)	10.8 (51.4)	7.9 (46.2)	5.0 (41.0)	3.4 (38.1)	7.1 (44.8)
Record low °C (°F)	−13.9 (7.0)	−10.6 (12.9)	−7.8 (18.0)	−3.3 (26.1)	0.0 (32.0)	2.8 (37.0)	4.4 (39.9)	5.0 (41.0)	−1.1 (30.0)	−4.4 (24.1)	−9.5 (14.9)	−11.7 (10.9)	−13.9 (7.0)
Record low wind chill	−16.3	−11.5	−12.2	−5.7	0.0	0.0	0.0	0.0	0.0	−5.3	−14.4	−18.4	−18.4
Average precipitation mm (inches)	445.3 (17.53)	288.4 (11.35)	299.1 (11.78)	256.8 (10.11)	133.7 (5.26)	119.0 (4.69)	74.3 (2.93)	112.2 (4.42)	161.6 (6.36)	335.1 (13.19)	454.4 (17.89)	430.7 (16.96)	3,110.5 (122.46)
Average rainfall mm (inches)	443.0 (17.44)	284.2 (11.19)	295.4 (11.63)	255.9 (10.07)	133.7 (5.26)	119.0 (4.69)	74.3 (2.93)	112.2 (4.42)	161.6 (6.36)	335.1 (13.19)	453.3 (17.85)	429.2 (16.90)	3,097 (121.93)
Average snowfall cm (inches)	2.3 (0.9)	4.2 (1.7)	3.7 (1.5)	0.8 (0.3)	0.0 (0.0)	0.0 (0.0)	0.0 (0.0)	0.0 (0.0)	0.0 (0.0)	0.0 (0.0)	1.0 (0.4)	1.5 (0.6)	13.5 (5.3)
Average precipitation days (≥ 0.2 mm)	23.5	19.8	22.2	20.5	15.1	15.2	10.9	12.4	14.4	21.3	23.5	24.2	222.9
Average rainy days (≥ 0.2 mm)	23.1	19.4	22.0	20.4	15.1	15.2	10.9	12.4	14.4	21.3	23.4	24.0	221.7
Average snowy days (≥ 0.2 cm)	0.93	1.3	1.1	0.39	0.04	0.0	0.0	0.0	0.0	0.0	0.36	0.62	4.7
Average relative humidity (%) (at 1500 LST)	87.8	80.6	80.0	79.3	77.8	80.3	81.9	84.1	84.6	86.0	85.9	88.2	83.0
Mean monthly sunshine hours	61.9	83.1	115.7	158.3	206.2	205.6	232.9	200.5	170.5	114.8	62.1	57.6	1,669.2
Percentage possible sunshine	23.0	29.1	31.5	38.5	43.4	42.3	47.6	44.9	45.0	34.2	22.6	22.5	35.4
Source: Environment and Climate Change Canada (June maximum) (sun 1981–2010)

== See also ==
- List of lighthouses in British Columbia
- List of lighthouses in Canada
- Henri de Miffonis (1882–1955), French-Canadian civil engineer
