= Cape Norman =

Lighthouse on Newfoundland, Canada

Cape Norman Lighthouse
- Location: Cape Norman, Newfoundland and Labrador, Canada
- Coordinates: 51°37′42″N 55°54′21″W

Tower
- Constructed: 1871 (first)
- Foundation: concrete base
- Construction: concrete tower
- Height: 15 m (49 ft)
- Shape: octagonal tower with balcony and lantern
- Markings: white tower, red lantern
- Operator: Canadian Coast Guard

Light
- First lit: 1964 (current)
- Focal height: 35 m (115 ft)
- Lens: 3rd order fresnel lens
- Range: 21 nmi (39 km; 24 mi)
- Characteristic: Fl(3) W 30s

Cape Norman is a barren, limestone headland located at the northernmost point of insular Newfoundland in the Canadian province of Newfoundland and Labrador.

Cape Norman first appeared on French maps as Cap Dordois, in 1713, and then as Cap Normand in 1744. Eventually, the name became anglicised to Cape Norman.

== Cape Norman Lighthouse ==
The Canadian government built a wooden, hexagonal lighthouse at Cape Norman during the summer construction seasons of 1870 and 1871, and the lighthouse was lit for the first time on 1 October 1871. A local man, Henry Locke, was hired as lightkeeper. In 1890, following a shipwreck at Belle Isle the previous summer, a steam-operated fog alarm was installed at the Cape Norman. John Warren Campbell, a steam engineer from Pictou, Nova Scotia, was hired as lightkeeper and fog alarm engineer, replacing Henry Locke, who was superannuated at that point. John Warren Campbell arrived at Cape Norman on board the SS Montreal in July 1890, beginning a family tenure which lasted until the station was automated in 1992;Alvin Campbell, great-grandson of John Warren Campbell. Alvin Campbell son Warren Campbell took over as lighthouse keeper in 2002 to Present day 2025 at Cape Norman.

== See also ==
- List of lighthouses in Canada
- Henri de Miffonis
