= Michipicoten Island =

Canadian island in Lake Superior

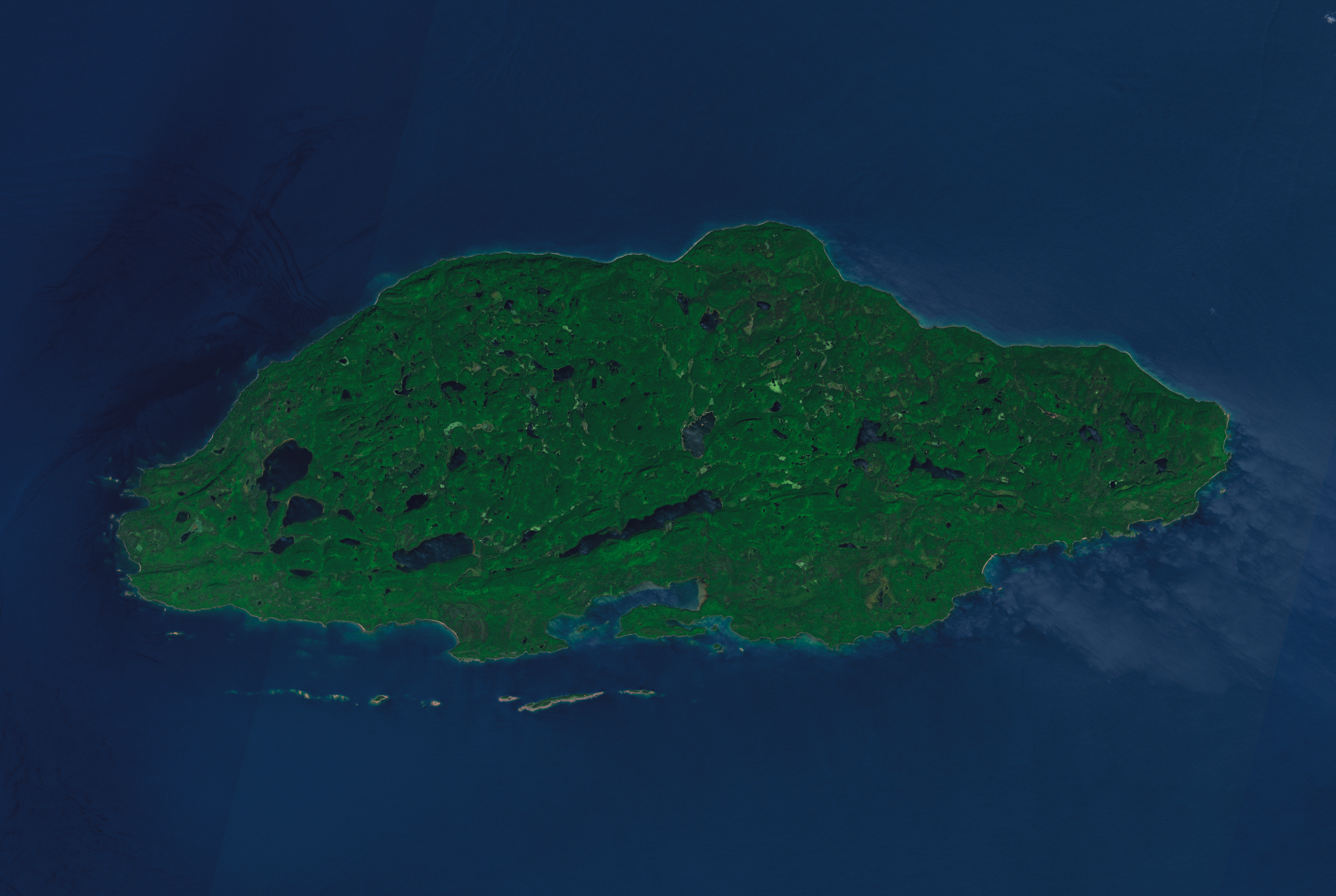
- Sentinel-2 view of the island.

- Location within Ontario

Geography
- Location: Lake Superior
- Coordinates: 47°45′N 85°45′W
- Area: 184 km^{2} (71 sq mi)

Administration
- Canada
- Province: Ontario
- District: Thunder Bay District

Demographics
- Population: Seasonally variable

Michipicoten Island Provincial Park
- IUCN category II (national park)
- Area: 36,740.00 ha (141.8539 sq mi)
- Designation: Natural Environment
- Established: 1985
- Governing body: Ontario Parks
- Website: www.ontarioparks.com/park/michipicotenisland

Michipicoten Island (/ˌmɪtʃɪpɪˈkɒtən/ MITCH-ip-i-KAH-tin) in Ontario, Canada, is in the northeastern part of Lake Superior, about 175 kilometres (109 mi) northwest of Sault Ste. Marie and 65 kilometres (40 mi) southwest of Wawa, Ontario. At its closest point to mainland Ontario, the island is about 16 kilometres (9.9 mi) from the mainland. It falls within the boundaries of Thunder Bay District. The third largest island in Lake Superior, after Isle Royale and St. Ignace Island, Michipicoten Island is 27 kilometres (17 mi) long and 10 kilometres (6.2 mi) wide at its widest point.

Most of the lands of Michipicoten Island, as well as smaller islands, shoals, and waters which surround it to within 2,500 metres (1.6 mi), were regulated as Michipicoten Island Provincial Park in 1985. Despite attempts to develop a comprehensive park management plan in the early- to mid-2000s, it continues to be administered by Ontario Parks under an interim management statement developed in 1986.

During the spring, summer, and fall, the island is inhabited or regularly visited by the owners of camps located on a small number of private inholdings, commercial fishers, and clients of a commercial outpost camp. It has become a destination for some adventurous kayakers. In the winter, due mainly to reasons of remoteness and difficulty of access, the island is usually uninhabited.

Michipicoten Island has plentiful wildlife (notably beaver, woodland caribou, and birds). It is located in the Great Lakes-St. Lawrence Forest region.

The island is made up of ancient lava bedrock related to volcanism of the Midcontinent Rift System and is heavily forested, with over 20 inland lakes. It has a rugged interior, containing east-west aligned ridges with gentle southern slopes and steep northern slopes. The highest point is 298 m (978 ft) above Lake Superior.

A lighthouse was established in 1912 on the eastern end of the island. It was staffed until 1988.

On some old maps, Michipicoten Island is shown as Isle Maurepas, after the French minister of Marine Jean-Frédéric Phélypeaux, Count of Maurepas. The word Michipicoten is an Anglicization of the original Ojibwe word Mishipikwadina, meaning "big bluffs" in Ojibwe, and is a reference to the geography of the nearby Michipicoten River.

Mishipeshu, a powerful creature in the traditional beliefs of some Native American tribes―particularly Anishinaabe tribes, the Odawa, Ojibwe, and Potawatomi, of the Great Lakes region of Canada and the United States―is traditionally said to make his home on Michipicoten Island.

== Fisheries ==
Virtually landlocked, Quebec Harbour on the south shore of the island became a strategic base of operations for regional fisheries. Men from the Hudson's Bay Company post at Michipicoten River were dispatched here for the fall fishing. In 1871 permanent buildings were erected by T. Griffiths and Co. and fishermen overwintered to take advantage of the late fall and early spring seasons. The site may have been operated by Chicago-based A. Booth Packing Company (later Booth Fisheries Co.). Established in 1848 by Alfred Booth, it acquired a lease to Crown Land on the south side of Quebec Harbour around 1860 but due to a title dispute moved to the north side in 1905.

The Ganley brothers. managers of the Dominion Transportation Line, ran a passenger boat between Sault Ste. Marie and Quebec Harbour. In the 1920s, the Booth Fisheries enterprise began to decline, reportedly due to poor management, and in 1934 its eastern Lake Superior interests and two tugs were sold to James Purvis and Son, Ltd. of Gore Bay, Manitoulin Island. A successful business was built by son Ivan through exploitation of new grounds, such as Superior Shoal, and opening of diverse markets. At its peak, 40 employees and families were stationed at the island, and the company held four tug licenses for a total of 220,000 m of gill net. It was sold in 1959 to Ferroclad Fisheries of Mamainse on Lake Superior's eastern shore.

== Woodland caribou ==
Michipicoten Island played host to an indigenous caribou population until the herd's extirpation, as a result of overhunting, in the mid-1800s. In 1981, a lone male caribou was observed on the island; how it arrived there remains unknown. In 1982, additional caribou - one male, three adult females and three female calves - were moved to the island from the Slate Islands by the Ministry of Natural Resources. An additional male was translocated in 1989. From the time of these relocations to 2001, the herd population increased at $\lambda=1.18$ to arrive at approximately 160 animals in 2001. A population determination performed in 2011 concluded that the herd had grown to 680 animals. At times, the rate of population growth was among the fastest ever recorded for caribou.

In the winter of 2014, four wolves transited to Michipicoten Island. This was facilitated by an ice bridge which had formed between the island and the mainland. The wolf population had more than tripled by the winter of 2016/2017. The 2017/2018 wolf population count was anticipated to reveal approximately 20 wolves present on the island. The decline in the caribou population as resulting from the presence of the wolves has raised the concern that the caribou population is in danger of extirpation as soon as the winter of 2017/2018.

The caribou population of Michipicoten Island is scientifically significant because it manifests an opportunity to apply A. T. Bergerud's proposed test to assess the viability of the range hypothesis versus the predation hypothesis for providing a credible explanation for caribou population decline. Adapted to Michipicoten Island, Bergerud's proposed test was two-part: First, the caribou population on Michipicoten Island should increase despite the lack of lichen in the island's Great Lakes/St. Lawrence Forest. This happened, and it indicated that lichen was not a critical requirement in the diet of caribou. Second, after the appearance of wolves, the population of caribou should decline. Should these population trends emerge, it would indicate conclusively that wolf predation, and not a lack of lichen as forwarded by the range hypothesis, was a key factor in the decline of caribou throughout North America.

The caribou population of Michipicoten Island is ecologically significant because it and the Slate Islands caribou population are all that conclusively and verifiably remain of a caribou population which was once found throughout the federally recognized ON6 Lake Superior caribou range. Ontario Ministry of Natural Resources and Forestry/Parks Canada 2016 caribou populations surveys failed to conclusively observe any caribou remaining in the lands along the north shore of Lake Superior.

As of March 2019 all of the remaining caribou and wolves had been moved off the island due to the low remaining population of caribou. A pack of eight of the wolves were translocated to Isle Royale in 2018.

== See also ==
- Henri de Miffonis
