= Nottawasaga Lighthouse =

Lighthouse in Ontario, Canada

Nottawasaga Lighthouse is a historic lighthouse on Nottawasaga Island in Nottawasaga Bay, a part of Georgian Bay, near Collingwood, Ontario, Canada. Constructed between 1857 and 1858, it was one of six Imperial Towers built on the shores of Lake Huron and Georgian Bay to improve navigation. The lighthouse is an 85-foot (26 m) stone tower built by John Brown and was designated a Classified Federal Heritage Building in 1999.

== History ==
The Nottawasaga Lighthouse was constructed in 1857 and 1858 on Nottawasaga Island as part of a federal effort to establish safer navigation routes along Lake Huron and Georgian Bay. The tower was one of six Imperial Towers built during the 1850s, alongside at Point Clark Lighthouse, Chantry Island Lighthouse, Cove Island Lighthouse, Griffith Island Lighthouse, and Christian Island Lighthouse, each constructed by Scottish stonemason John Brown. Its construction coincided with the development of Collingwood as a major port on Georgian Bay.

The lighthouse began operating on November 30, 1858. Its lighting apparatus was manufactured in Paris and transported to Collingwood before being installed at the lighthouse. The original lighting system used whale oil before being converted to petroleum in 1868. The light was operated from sunset to sunrise and was visible for approximately 17 miles (27 km).

The lighthouse was staffed by lightkeepers and their families. Among the longest-serving keepers was George Collins, who served at Nottawasaga Lighthouse for more than three decades. In 1872, Collins was involved in the rescue of passengers following the sinking of the steamer Mary Ward on a shoal in Georgian Bay. Collins assisted in rescuing 24 people and had saved 52 lives over 32 years of service.

A fire severely damaged the lightkeeper's residence in 1958. The light was automated in 1959, after which the lighthouse was maintained by personnel based on the mainland. The lightkeeper's residence was partially demolished in 1971.

The lighthouse was decommissioned in 2003. In 2004, a lightning strike damaged the tower's exterior masonry, causing portions of the limestone facing to fall away. The Canadian Coast Guard installed metal bands around the tower in 2006 as a temporary measure to stabilize the exterior.

== Architecture ==
The Nottawasaga Lighthouse is an 85-foot (26 m) tapered stone tower with a slightly projecting corbelled gallery and a twelve-sided cast-iron lantern. The lantern is topped by a domed copper roof with a ball-pinnacle ventilator. The tower's exterior is constructed of limestone and has a whitewashed, rusticated surface.

The tower's walls are approximately seven feet (2 m) thick at the base and become narrower toward the top. Its structural design uses heavy timber for lateral stability, with inner and outer masonry walls and rubble infill.

The Nottawasaga Lighthouse is the only intact historic structure remaining on Nottawasaga Island. Its position on the island made it a prominent navigational landmark for vessels approaching Collingwood Harbour.

== Preservation ==
Following its decommissioning, the lighthouse's exterior masonry deteriorated after a lightning strike in 2004 and was considered at risk of collapse. The Nottawasaga Lighthouse was included on the National Trust for Canada's Top 10 Endangered Places List in 2016 because of deterioration to its exterior masonry and the risk of further damage from water infiltration.

The Nottawasaga Lighthouse Preservation Society (NLPS), established in 2015, began efforts to protect and restore the lighthouse. In 2016, the society wrapped the tower in weather-resistant material supported by a wooden framework to reduce moisture penetration. The society has worked with Fisheries and Oceans Canada on the preservation and potential transfer of the property.

== Heritage designation ==
The Nottawasaga Lighthouse was formally recognized as a Classified Federal Heritage Building on March 18, 1999. It was added to the Canadian Register of Historic Places in 2006. Its heritage value is based on its historical associations, architectural characteristics, and relationship to its maritime setting.

== Lighthouse keepers ==
The following is a list of lightkeepers associated with the Nottawasaga Lighthouse:

- Archibald McDougall (1857)
- Robert Mills (1858)
- David McBeath (1858–1859)
- George F. Collins (1859–1890)
- Arthur George Clark (1890–1903)
- Sarah Clark (1903–1904)
- John F. Burmister (1904–1911)
- James McNabb (1912–1913)
- Anne McNabb (1913–1915)
- Thomas W. Bowie (1915–1924)
- Thomas Edward Foley (1924–1932)
- Samuel Neally Hillen (1933–1942)
- William "Scotty" Hogg (1943–1952)
- James A. Keith (1953–1956)
- James F. Dineen (1957–1959)
- Ross White (1960–1961)
- Harry Ward (1962–1963)
- Wilfred Neil Johnston (1964–1983)

== See also ==
- List of lighthouses in Ontario
- List of lighthouses in Canada
