= Cove Island Light =

Lighthouse in Ontario, Canada

Cove Island Lighthouse
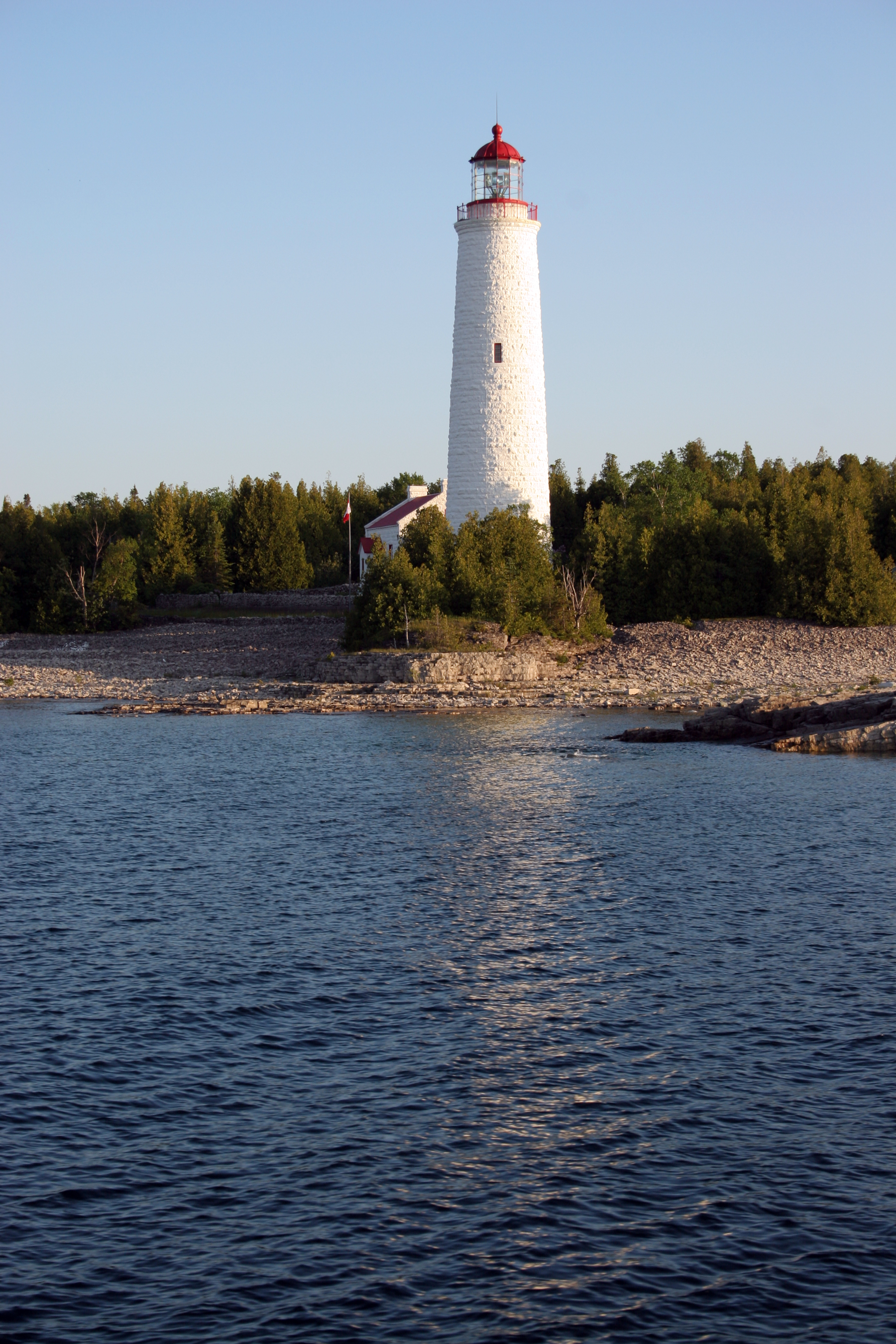
- Cove Island Lighthouse, June 2008
- Location: Cove Island at Gig Point; Bruce Peninsula; Tobermory; Ontario
- Coordinates: 45°19′37″N 81°44′07″W

Tower
- Constructed: 1855
- Construction: limestone tower
- Automated: 1991
- Height: 24 metres (79 ft)
- Shape: tapered cylindrical tower with balcony and lantern
- Markings: white tower, red lantern
- Operator: Fathom Five National Marine Park
- Heritage: classified federal heritage building of Canada

Light
- First lit: 1858
- Focal height: 31 metres (102 ft)
- Characteristic: Fl W 5s.

The Cove Island Light, at Gig Point on the island, is located in Fathom Five National Marine Park, but is not part of the Park. It is situated on the Bruce Peninsula, Ontario, Canada. It has been a navigational aid in the narrow channel between Lake Huron and Georgian Bay since 30 October 1858. It was the first of six stone Imperial Towers to be completed; all were illuminated by 1859. Most other lighthouses of the era were built of brick, wood, iron or concrete.

The six were built at a time when commercial shipping traffic was increasing on the Great Lakes between Canada and the U.S. because of new trade agreements and the opening of the Sault Ste. Marie Canal locks in 1855. The settlement of the Bruce Peninsula was also well underway by then, making the lighthouses even more useful. They acted as navigational aids for the boats and ships on Lake Huron and Georgian Bay. All are currently operating as automated lights.

The Tower, Cove Island, Ontario, was formally registered on the Canadian Register of Historic Places on 14 November 2014. The federal government restored the site in 2015–2016.

== History ==
The origin of the Imperial designation is not certain, but some historians speculate that because the towers were public construction built under the colonial administration while Canada was a self-governing colony of Britain, the name would assure at least some funding from the British Empire's Board of Trade. All six Imperial towers, along with a limestone lightkeeper's dwelling, were constructed by John Brown (builder) from Thorold, Ontario, a contractor and stonemason.

The design aspects of the tower are virtually identical to those of the Point Clark Lighthouse, well described in a Government of Canada document.

The lamp itself underwent several transformations starting with an Argand lamp fueled with sperm whale oil, then a flat wick coal oil lamp, replaced with an oil vapour light about 1900. Vapourized kerosene was burned to keep the beacon aglow. An on-site generator provided electricity during the 1950s and in 1971, an underwater power cable was laid from Tobermory to the island.

The powerful "second order" Fresnel lens was manufactured by the Louis Saulter Company in Paris and installed by workmen from France inside the polygonal lantern with its three rows of rectangular glass panes.

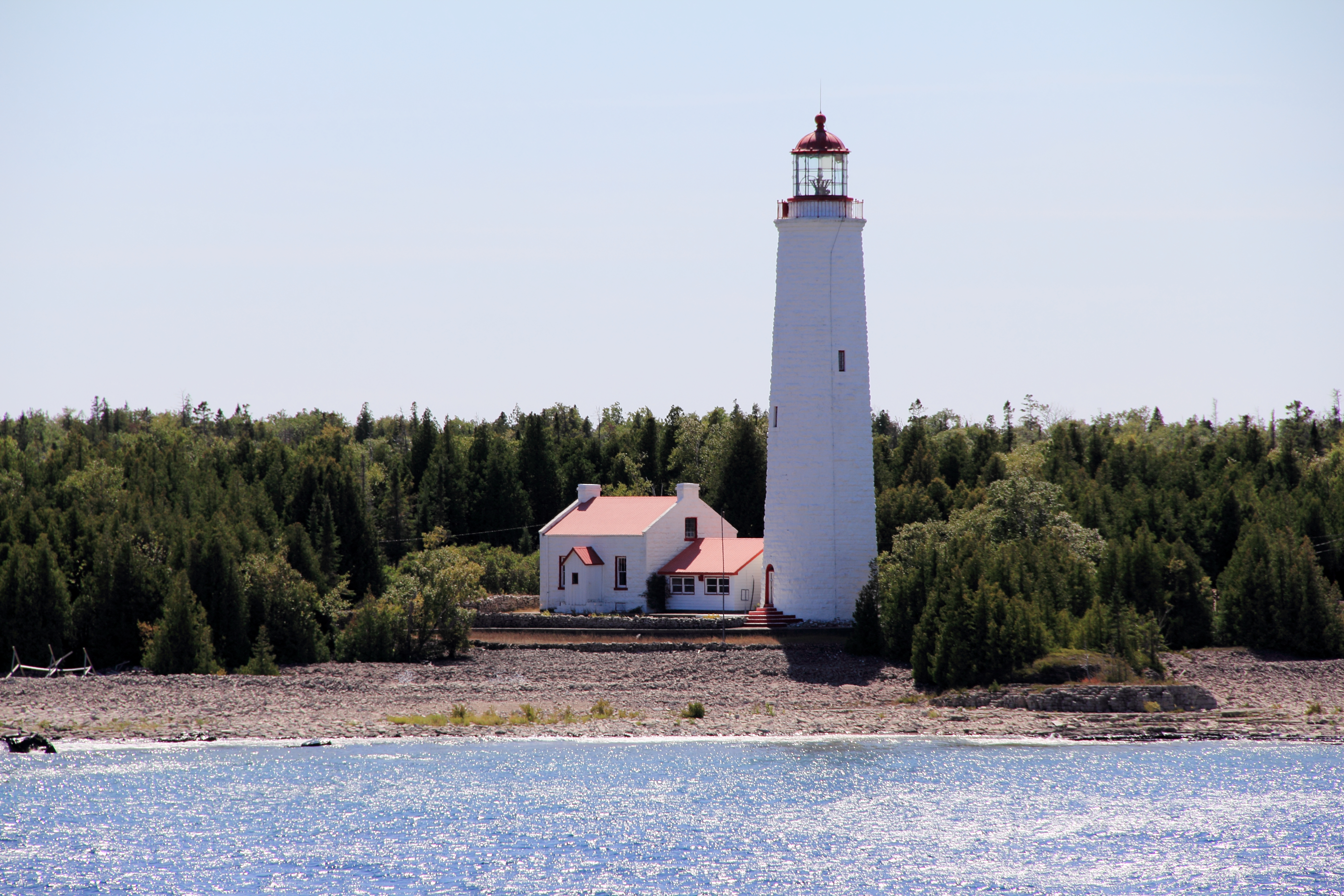
Lightstation on Cove Island

Similar in style to the other Imperial Towers lighthouses on Chantry Island, at Point Clark and on Griffith Island, Georgian Bay, the Cove Island lighthouse has five sets of stairs with 15 steps each, one set with 11 steps and the final curved iron stairway to the lamp room has nine steps (total: 95 steps). An iron door leads into the lamp room. The stone lightkeeper's cottage adjacent to the tower was built at the same time. The "new" lightkeepers house was built in 1970 a short distance from the tower.

This lightstation was continuously staffed from 1858 to 1991, making it the longest keeper-occupied light in Ontario.

The lighthouse tower, the original house and fog plant, a workshop, the assistant keeper's house and the modern lightkeeper's house make up the lightstation today. The light is currently a valuable aid to navigation operated by the Canadian Coast Guard; it is the only Imperial Tower that is still using the original Fresnel lens. Although the facility has been renovated, access to the island is restricted so tours are not available. Views from the ferry or a private boat are excellent.

== Lightkeepers ==
George F. Collins (1858–1860) was the first person to serve as light keeper at the Isle of Coves. Born in England, in 1817, George Collins went to sea at the young age of 12 where he traveled the world becoming a captain by his early 20s. In 1851, Collins immigrated to Canada to live in Kingston before moving to Collingwood in 1855.

When the Imperial Towers were being built, applications for positions as light keepers came in from all over the country. With his maritime experience, George Collins applied for the Nottawasaga Lighthouse near his home at Collingwood. Surprisingly, he was instead appointed keeper at the Isle of Coves. Collins' salary was $435 per year.

Like the keeper at Point Clark, Collins was required to clean and whitewash the tower as required, to fuel the light and, twice a day, to wind up the clockwork-like mechanism—with weights and pulleys—that enabled the weights to rotate the lens.

David McBeath, on the other hand, applied for the light keeper's position at Isle of Coves, and was initially given the job at Nottawasaga instead. Eventually, in 1860, the two were able to switch jobs.

David McBeath (1860 - 1872): Of all the stories the Isle of Coves Light station has to tell, nothing compares with the drama of David McBeath and his family running out of food with the lake already freezing. Provisions finally arrived on a steamship before they starved.

William McBeath (1872 - 1876)

Bryce Millar, (1876 – 1878)

George Currie (1878–1902) is remembered for his part in the aftermath of the sinking of the schooner 'Regina' off Gat Point, Cove Island, on 10 September 1866. The ship sank and the captain, Amos Tripp, a "mysterious character" according to some reports drowned during the storm. His body was found on Cove Island by George Currie. The body was returned to the family two weeks later.

William Collier (1902 - 1903)

Kenneth McLeod (1903 - 1912)

William Simpson (1912 - 1915)

Jack Leslie (1915 - 1945)

Harold ("Hal") Banas (1945-1946) lived on the island with his wife Iris and his brother, assistant keeper Earl Banas. Hal and Iris had married in a ceremony on the island.

Russell Botham, (1947–1948)

William (Bill) Spears (1949–1976) knew that his work must continue, transmitting information to Wiarton in addition to operating the light. Even when he was seriously ill with mumps in 1954, he had to continue radio reports while spending long days between the generator engines.

Robert (Bob) Nelder (1977 – 1981)

Jack Vaughn was the last light keeper at Cove Island (1982-1991). Because of automation, his role was virtually one of caretaker, particularly in the last few years.

== See also ==
- List of lighthouses in Ontario
- List of lighthouses in Canada
- Great Lakes Storm of 1913
