= John Brown (builder) =

John Brown (c. 1809–1876) was a Canadian builder of Scottish origin.

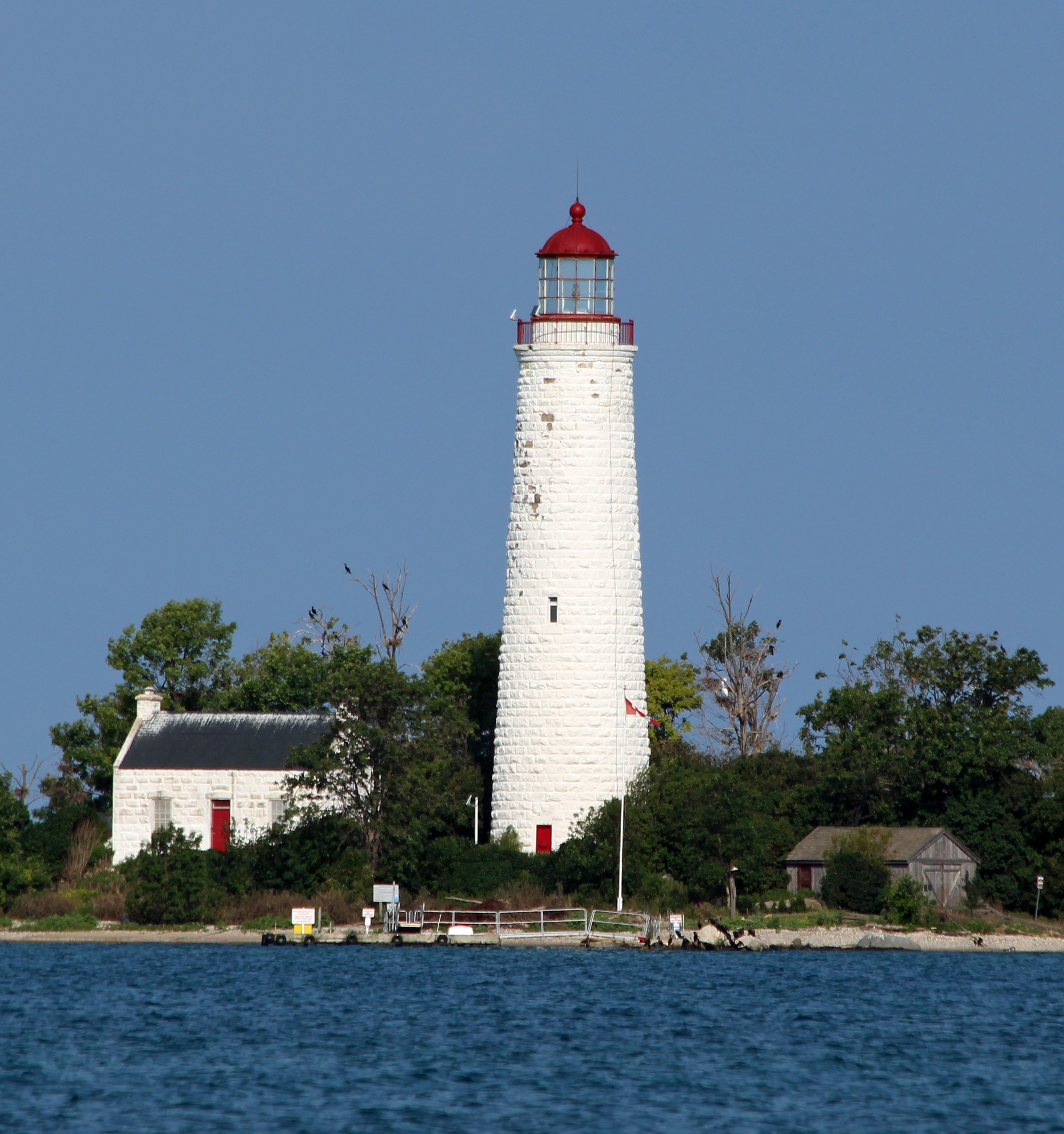
Chantry Island lighthouse, one of six nearly identical Imperial Towers built by Brown

Brown began his career as a stonemason's apprentice in Glasgow. At 23 he emigrated to the United States, to upstate New York. By 1838 he had moved again, this time to Thorold, Ontario, where he was to spend the remainder of his career.

Brown's first government project was the construction of the Gull Island Lighthouse in Lake Erie between 1846 and 1848. Subsequently, he was retained to build seven additional lightstations in Ontario, including one in Burlington, Ontario.

Brown is best remembered for building Ontario's Imperial Towers, six nearly identical light stations (tower and keeper's dwelling) made of cut stone, and not brick, metal, wood or concrete that was common in the 1850s. All were on Lake Huron or Georgian Bay. Initially, eleven were planned but only six were built, between 1855 and 1859. (The projects cancelled were to be at White Fish Island, Mississagi Strait, Isle St. Joseph, Clapperton Island and Badgley Island.)

The origin of the designation Imperial is not certain, but some historians speculate that because the towers were public construction built under the colonial administration while Canada was a self-governing colony of Britain, the name would assure at least some funding from the British Empire's Board of Trade. According to the Heritage Character Statement from the Government of Canada (for the Chantry Island lighthouse (typical of the six), the design is very strong and somewhat ornate.

All were built at a time when commercial shipping traffic was increasing on the Great Lakes between Canada and the U.S. because of new trade agreements and the opening of the Sault Ste. Marie Canal locks in 1855. The settlement of the Bruce Peninsula was already well underway at the time, also making the lighthouses timely as navigational aids for the boats and ships.

== The six Imperial Towers ==
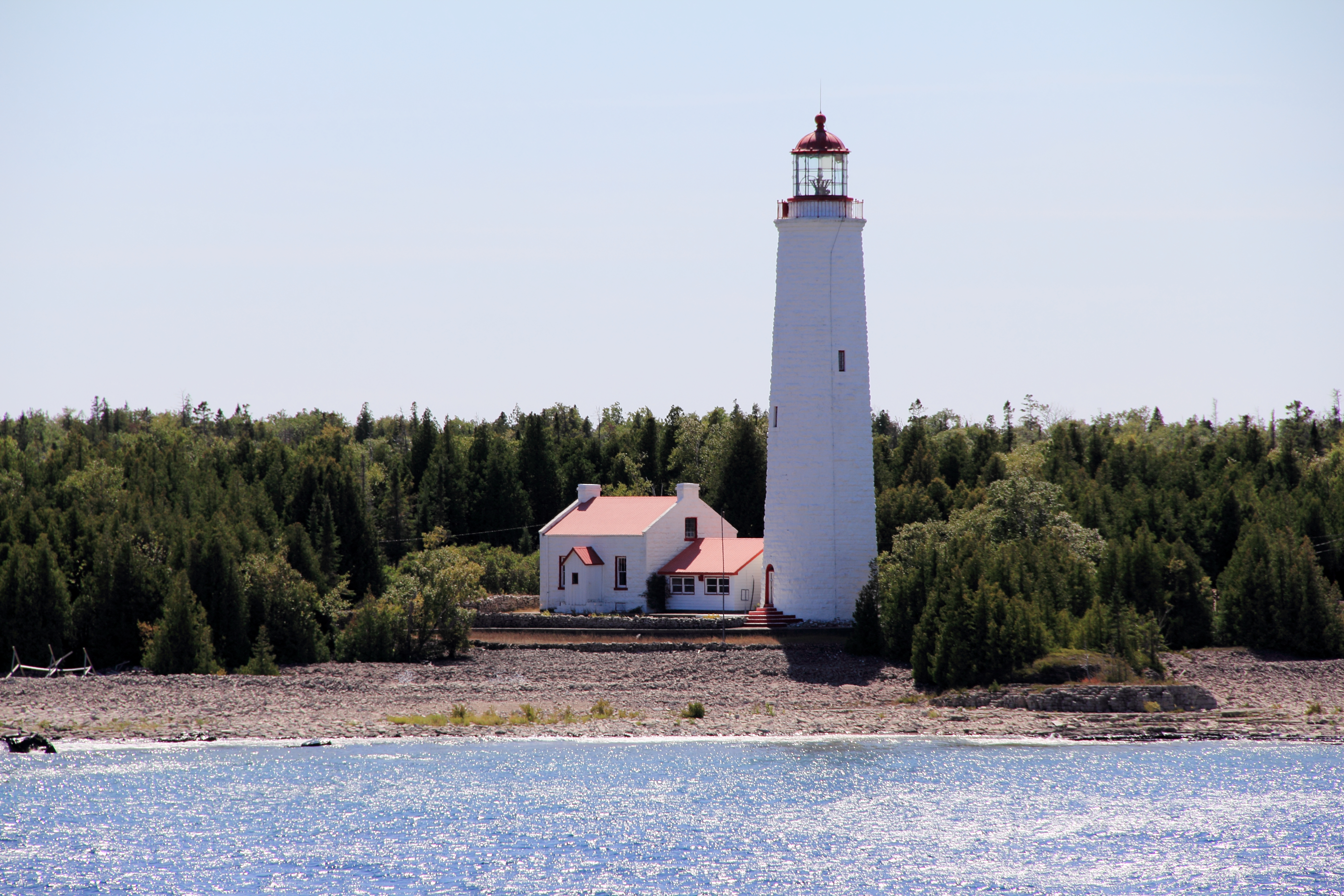
Cove Island tower and keeper's dwelling

All six of the following are still standing and operating as automated lights. The lighthouses at Cove Island, Point Clark and Chantry Island are the most significant today since they have been restored and designated as Historic Places or Historic Sites by the Government of Canada. (The light stations at Point Clark and Chantry Island are open for tours.)

- Point Clark Lighthouse 44.07281°N 81.75731°W
- Chantry Island Lightstation Tower 44.48938°N 81.40194°W
- Cove Island Light 45.32699°N 81.73505°W
- Nottawasaga Island Lighthouse 44.53656°N 80.25702°W
- Griffith Island Light 44.85058°N 80.89137°W
- Christian Island Light 44.78664°N 80.15607°W

== Construction ==
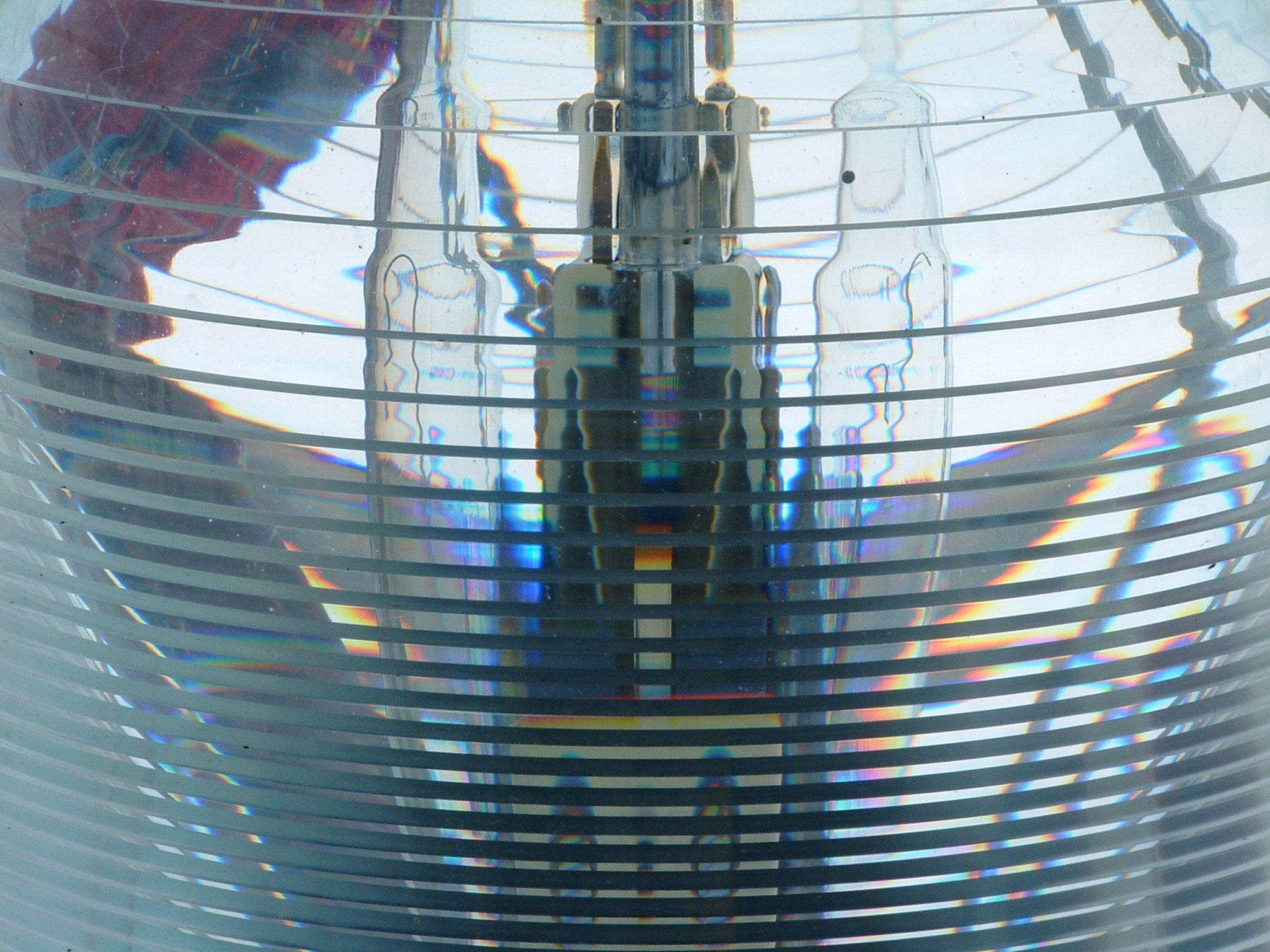
Chantry Fresnel Lens

Construction of the lights was plagued by difficulties. Brown lost four full supply boats, all of which sank before reaching their destinations and unloading. More supplies were lost from being swept overboard during storms and rough seas. Furthermore, delivery of the lighting apparatus for each tower was delayed by competing demand from lighthouse expansion in the United States and a bottleneck in the delivery of the lenses. The Fresnel lenses were made by the Louis Sautter Company of Paris and installed by specialist workmen from France. The most powerful (second-order) lenses were used at Point Clark, Chantry, Cove and Nottawasaga Island.

Due to the high costs and delays, Brown was facing bankruptcy by 1857, and petitioned the provincial government for assistance. Presumably, the government responded favourably, since Brown remained in business until his death. By 1859 all six Imperial Towers were lit. The final cost was approximately $223,000, a massive sum in that era.

== Description ==
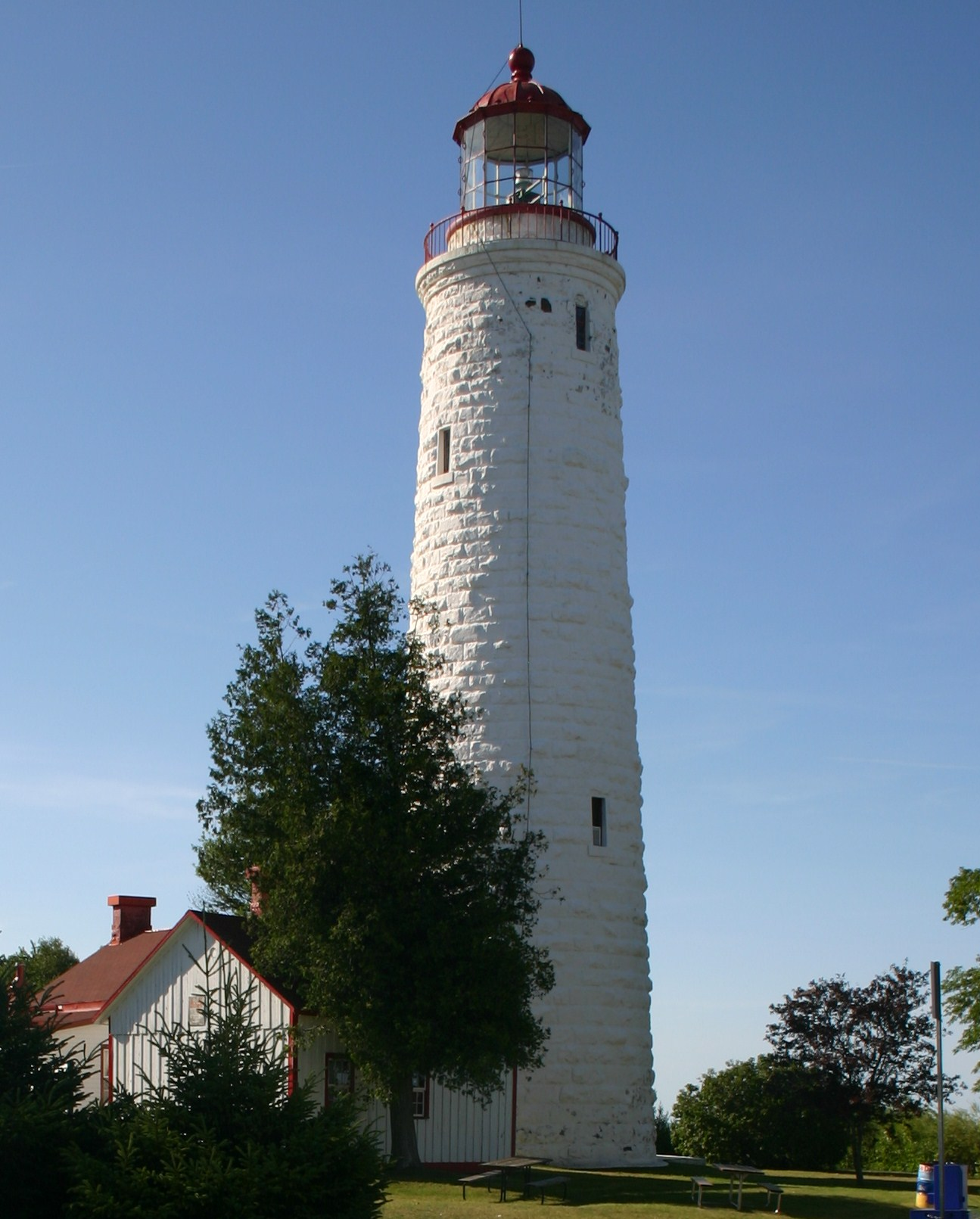
Point Clark Lighthouse

Only minor variations exist in the design of the six towers, as was required for the different building sites. They are all around 80 feet (24 m) tall, with the exception of Christian Island, a 55-foot (17 m) tower. The rock courses at the bottom of the towers reach some seven feet thick, and the walls at ground level are six feet thick, tapering towards two feet thickness at the top. Though the lighthouses are conical, their interior diameter is 10 feet 6 inches (3.20 m) throughout.

The towers and dwellings are constructed of limestone, with a granite section near the top of the tower for extra rigidity to support the lantern rooms. The lanterns are made of copper alloys, glass, and cast iron.

The towers are whitewashed and painted with red trim. Each was initially equipped with a Fresnel lens; they were the first Canadian lighthouses so equipped.

== See also ==
- History of Lighthouses in Canada
- List of lighthouses in Ontario
- List of lighthouses in Canada
- Heritage Lighthouse Protection Act
