= Point Clark =

Community in Ontario, Canada

Coordinates: 44.070°N 81.749°W

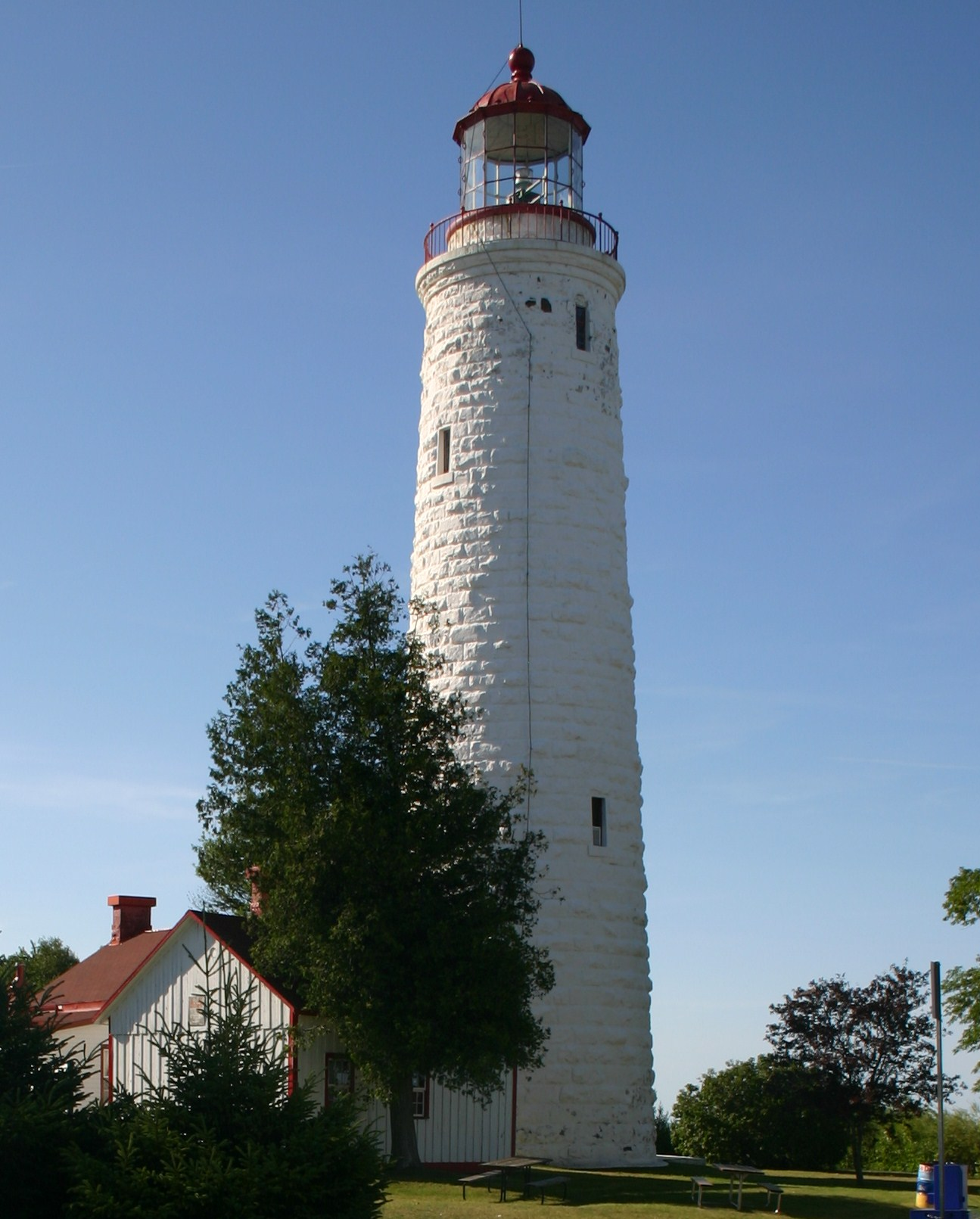
The lighthouse in Point Clark

Point Clark is a lakefront cottage community on Lake Huron, in the municipality of Huron-Kinloss, Ontario, Canada. It is approximately 15 kilometres south of Kincardine and 40 kilometres north of Goderich. Main streets include Huron Road and Lake Range Road. Point Clark is served by Highway 21 (Ontario). It is a cottage town, and has a rare Imperial Tower style lighthouse. There is a sandy beach and a small harbour with a boat ramp. There are two streams or rivers that run into Lake Huron around Point Clark: Clark Creek and Pine River. There is a separate harbour in the mouth of the Pine River. The lighthouse boat harbour gets dredged every year while the Pine River is only dredged when needed, and the corn roast held in every august is held in the Pine River boat club. Amberley is just outside and to the south of Point Clark and Lucknow is to the south-east of Point Clark.

The community center is located on Lake Range Drive. It hosts community events and includes a baseball diamond. There is also St. Luke's Church and cemetery along the Pine River bed. Several parks are in Point Clark as well. There is the Lion's Park and tennis court located on Alfred Street, There is the Blue Park located on Conession Road 2. Attawandaron Park is located on Attawandron Road and features a tennis court. The lighthouse also has a park and bathrooms. The lighthouse playground was recently taken down and replaced with a newer structure as of June 2025. Car and firework shows are also hosted at the lighthouse.

This lighthouse of one of six Imperial Towers built in the 1850s on Lake Huron and Georgian Bay. They were built at a time when commercial shipping traffic was increasing on the Great Lakes between Canada and the U.S. because of new trade agreements and the opening of the Sault Ste. Marie Canal locks in 1855. The Bruce Peninsula was also open to settlement by 1850, making the lighthouses timely. All were made of cut limestone and granite, not of brick, metal, wood or concrete as most others were on the Great Lakes.

The Point Clark Lighthouse was formally registered as one of the National Historic Sites of Canada on 25 May 1966. It is the only lighthouse on the Great Lakes and Georgian Bay to receive that highest level of merit. The light keeper's house is a Recognized Federal Heritage Building, a place of historic interest (14 July 1994). Both can be toured by the public.

== History ==
In 1850, Point Clark was originally called The Point and the Post Office was called Pine River. Later, the area was known as Pine Point as a lantern was hung from a pine tree to warn sailors of the shoal off the point, prior to the building of the lighthouse. After settlers moved in from Clark Township, Huron County, the area was known as "Clark's Point". Later, the town received the name it bears today—Point Clark.'

At the end of 1853, six municipalities were formed in the new township of Huron. Capt. Henry C. Gamble, an Irish man arrived in 1856 to visit to his brother, J. W. Gamble. He decided to remain and to develop the area into a business centre. He bought land near the mouth of the river and built a saw and grist mill. At the time, the neighbourhood was called "The Point." Capt. Gamble did not succeed with his plan to develop the area and returned to Ireland.

The government arranged for the building of the Point Clark Lighthouse between 1855 and 1859, during the building of the Imperial Towers; many referred to it as the Pine Point light. The tower and keeper's home were extensively restored between 2011 and 2014 and reopened to the public in 2015. The museum in the keeper's home and an outbuilding provides a glimpse into the life of light keepers of the past. Since the lighthouse is on the mainland (not on an island) it can easily reached by vehicle. The entire facility including the tower, operated by the Township of Huron-Kinloss, can be toured from mid June to Labour Day for a fee.

== Media ==
- The Kincardine Record - The Kincardine area's (including Point Clark & Ripley) local newspaper.
- Cable television is provided by Rogers TV and HuronTel
- CIYN-FM 95.5 "Shoreline Classics" - Kincardine and area's classic rock station
- CHWC-FM 104.9 "Country 104.9" - local country music station broadcasting from Goderich, Ontario
- CKNX-FM 101.7 "The One" - local, regional and national news and adult contemporary music
- CIBU-FM 94.5 "The Bull" - local, regional and national news and classic rock music
- CKNX (AM) 920 - country music

== Bus Transportation ==
- First Student Canada (buses from Kincardine, Ontario) (for students bused to schools in Kincardine)
- Ross Young Bus Lines (buses from Tiverton, Ontario) (serving the Bruce County area, for school students bused to Kincardine)
- Montgomery Bus Lines (buses from Wingham, Ontario) (also serving the Huron-Kinloss area) (also for students bused to Ripley-Huron Community School)
