= Huron-Kinloss =

- Township (lower-tier)
- Township of Huron-Kinloss
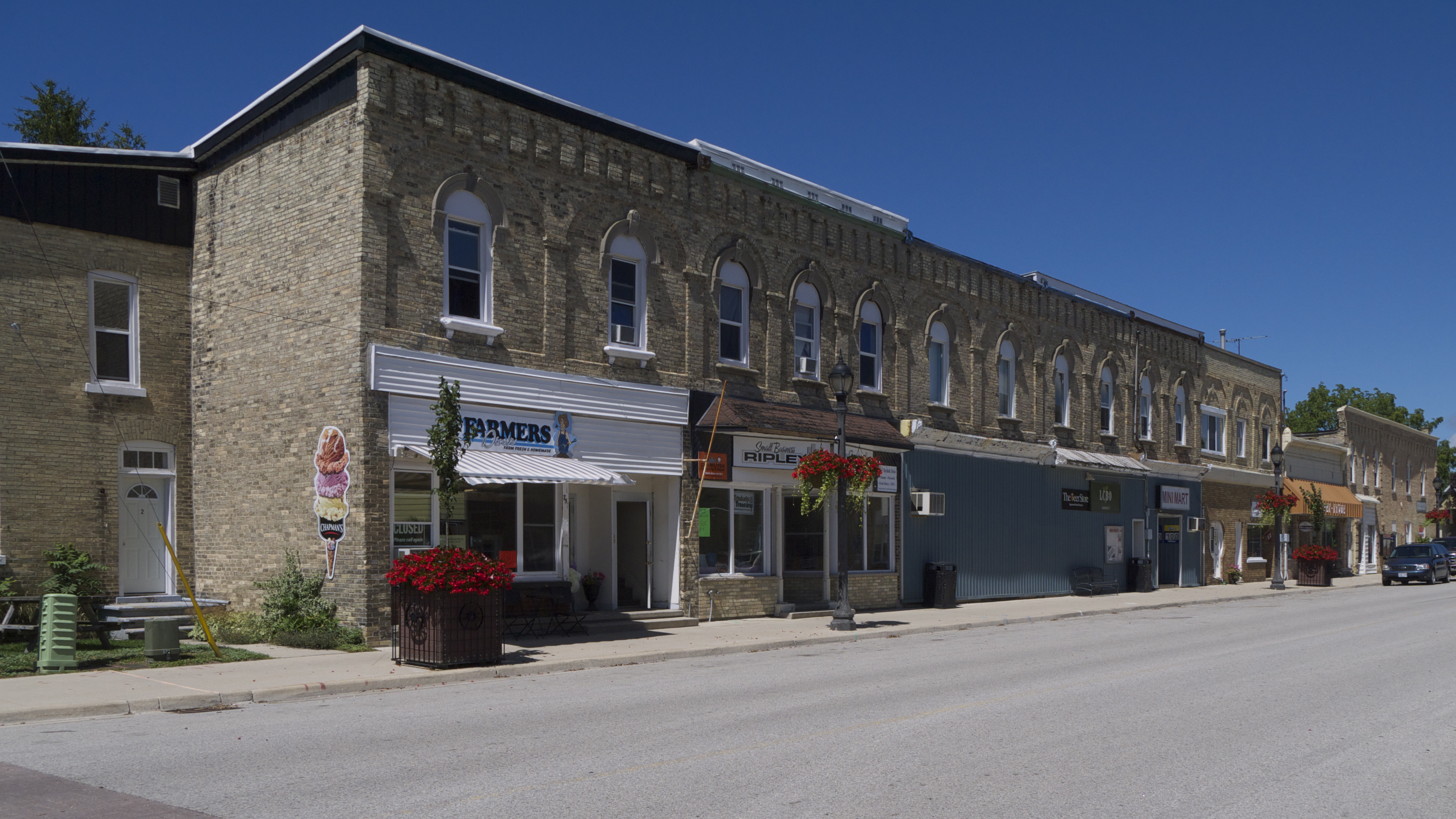
- Huron Street, Ripley

- Location within Bruce County Location within Southern Ontario
- Coordinates: 44°03′N 81°32′W
- Country: Canada
- Province: Ontario
- County: Bruce
- Settled: 1850s
- Formed: January 1, 1999

Government
  - Mayor: Don Murray
  - Fed. riding: Huron—Bruce
  - Prov. riding: Huron—Bruce

Area
  - Land: 440.73 km^{2} (170.17 sq mi)

Population (2021)
  - Total: 7,723
  - Density: 167.5/km^{2} (434/sq mi)
- Time zone: UTC-5 (EST)
  - Summer (DST): UTC-4 (EDT)
- Postal Code: N0G
- Area codes: 519, 226, 548
- Website: www.huronkinloss.com

Huron-Kinloss is a township in the Canadian province of Ontario, located within Bruce County. The township had a population of 7,723 in the 2021 Canadian census.

Economically, the township depends heavily on agriculture, agricultural services and tourism. A number of residents work in Kincardine or Goderich, with the Bruce Nuclear Generating Station being the largest employer in the area. With tourism and the Bruce Nuclear Generating Station, the local economy is more prosperous than many similar regions.

The Town of Ripley, in Huron-Kinloss is home to the Bruce Botanical Food Gardens. This public garden is the first of its kind in Canada using tourism to address the issues of food insecurity, sustainable agriculture and the plight of the small family farm. The non-profit organization is focused on rare, endangered, heirloom, and ethnocultural food plants and showcases over 250 varieties with over 10,000 plants overall in the Phase One development.

The region is popular with retirees, with a lake-moderated mild climate and a reputation for a relaxed, friendly lifestyle.

The boiler from the Erie Belle explosion lies on Boiler Beach at the northern end of the township.

== Geography ==
Huron-Kinloss is located in Western Ontario, on Lake Huron. It is relatively remote, particularly by the standards of densely populated Southern Ontario and remains a primarily rural region of farmland and woodlots. The lake shore is sparsely populated with the village of Point Clark at the south end and Boiler Beach at the north end, with a mixture of seasonal and permanent cottages along the shore in between. Lucknow and Ripley are the largest towns inland.

=== Communities ===
The township comprises the communities of:

- Amberley
- Bruce Beach
- Blair's Grove
- Clarks Church
- Clover Valley
- Holyrood
- Kinloss
- Kinlough
- Langside
- Lower Langside
- Lucknow
- Lurgan Beach
- Pine River
- Point Clark
- Purple Grove
- Reid's Corners
- Ripley
- Verdun
- Whitechurch

The communities can be separated into two groups - inland communities in the rural agricultural area of the township, and lakefront communities with seasonal and full-time residents.

==== Inland communities ====
Amberley
Amberley is along the Highway 21 with several houses and the Amberley General Store. One of the founders of Research in Motion (RIM) is building a summer home/mansion to the south, in ACW Township, just south of the Amberley Beach.

Holyrood
This hamlet lies beyond Ripley on the outskirts of the township, and community centre.

Pine River
Just minutes from Bruce Beach, Pine River is inland, and is settled around Highway 21. The Pine River Cheese Factory is located here, and makes many types of cheeses. A fire in 2010 put work to a standstill. It has started functioning once again producing their high quality cheese and butter.

Ripley
One of the larger hamlets in the township, it can be considered a large village. It boasts boutiques, two variety stores, and the public school; Ripley Huron Community Public School. The annual fair is held at the arena on the last weekend of September. Every ten years, the Ripley Reunion is held on the August Civic holiday weekend. The next Reunion will be in 2025.

==== Lakefront communities ====
Point Clark
At the southern end of Huron Kinloss is the cottage settlement of Point Clark. It stretches from the southern edge of Huron-Kinloss to the mouth of the Pine River and Concession 4. Although many cottages are used seasonally, about one third are full-time homes.

Lurgan Beach
Between Bruce Beach and Point Clark is Lurgan Beach. There are many year round residents, as well as cottages. The earth is very sandy, and sand dunes are widespread. The Boat Club is in Lurgan Beach, at the mouth of the Pine River.

Blair's Grove
North of Lurgan Beach is Blair's Grove, named after the Blair family who originally settled in this area. It is home to many cottages and full-time residents, and is characterized by large estate-sized lots. It is also home to the Blair's Grove Nature Trail, which is a loop trail through the unsettled centre of Blair's Grove. There is a public lake/beach access point at the end of Greenbrae Cres / Oak St.

Emmerton Beach
North of Blair's Grove is Emmerton Beach, named after the Emmerton family who originally settled this area. There is a public lake/beach access point at the end of Hill St.

South Bruce Beach
This is the area of Bruce Beach at the end of Concession 6, separated from Bruce Beach by Tout's Grove. There is a public lake/beach access point at the end of Concession 6, as well as grassy field used as a baseball diamond, and a private tennis court and a private nature trail.

Tout's Grove
More information needed!

Bruce Beach
North of Lurgan Beach, Blair's Grove and Emmerton Beach is Bruce Beach, a cluster of cottages and a nice, sandy public beach. Bruce Beach stretches from Concession 8 to Concession 10.

Boiler Beach
North of Bruce Beach lies Boiler Beach - so named because the boiler from the Erie Belle is lodged in the beach. Boiler Beach stretches from Concession 10 to the southern boundary of Kincardine.

== History ==
The area was founded as a Scottish settlement in the mid-19th century by 109 families forced to leave the Isle Of Lewis during the Highland Clearances. The first post office at Ripley opened in 1857, and many of its original settlers are buried in the local Lewis Gaelic cemetery.

The Township of Huron-Kinloss was formed on January 1, 1999, through the amalgamation of the townships of Huron and Kinloss and the towns of Ripley and Lucknow.

== Demographics ==
In the 2021 Census of Population conducted by Statistics Canada, Huron-Kinloss had a population of 7,723 living in 3,026 of its 4,107 total private dwellings, a change of 9.3% from its 2016 population of 7,069. With a land area of 440.73 km^{2} (170.17 sq mi), it had a population density of 17.5/km^{2} (45.4/sq mi) in 2021.

Historical census populations – Huron-Kinloss
Year	Pop.	±%
2001	6,224	—
2006	6,515	+4.7%
2011	6,790	+4.2%
2016	7,069	+4.1%
2021	7,723	+9.3%
Source: Statistics Canada

- Population total in 1996: 6,284
  - Huron (township): 3,792
  - Kinloss (township): 1,277
  - Lucknow (village): 1,215
- Population in 1991: 6,149
  - Huron (township): 3,755
  - Kinloss (township): 1,265
  - Lucknow (village): 1,129

== Notable people ==
- Lloyd Pollock (born in Pine River), president of the Canadian Amateur Hockey Association.

== See also ==
- List of townships in Ontario
