= Chantry Island (Ontario) =

Canadian island in Lake Huron

Coordinates: 44.4898°N 81.4039°W

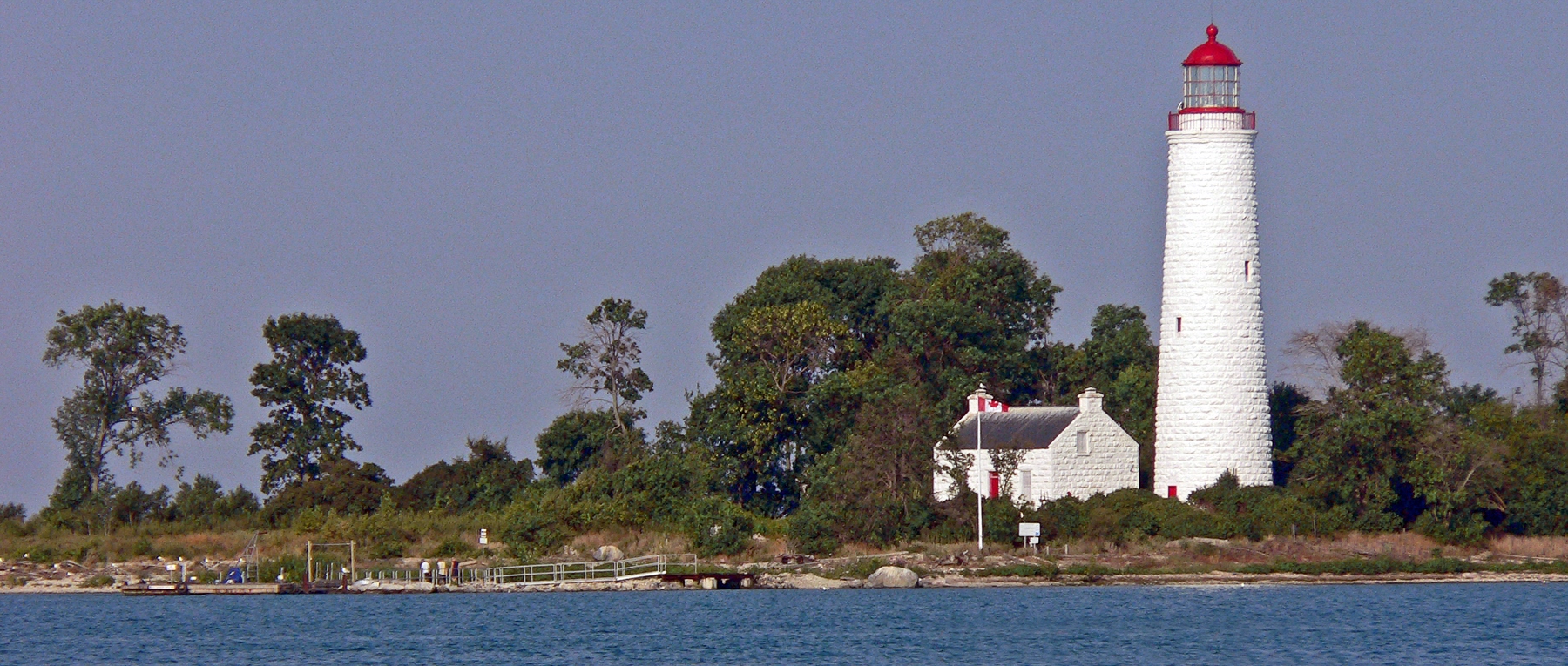
Chantry Island from the licensed tour boat

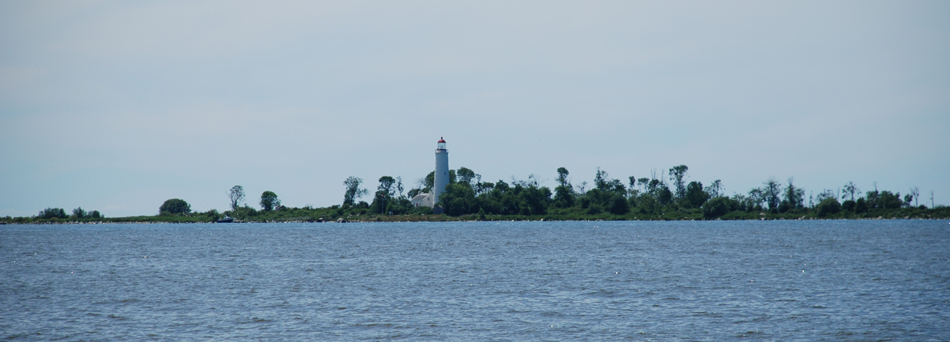
Chantry Island from the Southampton, Ontario shore

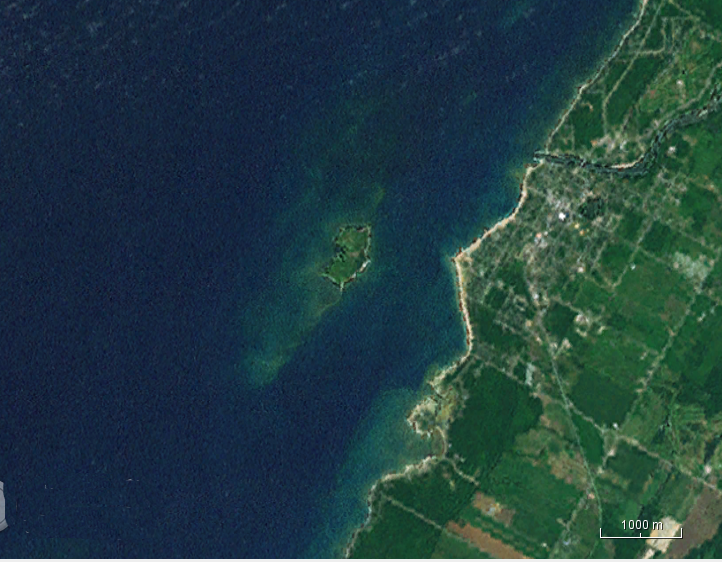
Landsat view of the island

Chantry Island is a small island in Lake Huron, south of the mouth of the Saugeen River and approximately a kilometre off the shores of the town of Southampton, Ontario. It is approximately 19 hectares (47 acres) in size and is a migratory bird sanctuary. Since the sanctuary territory extends 183 metres into the water surrounding the island, the total official area is listed as 63 hectares (160 acres).

British naval officer and surveyor Henry Wolsey Bayfield named the island in 1822 after the British sculptor Francis Leggatt Chantrey. The island was designated as one of the Canadian Wildlife Service's migratory bird sanctuaries in 1957 because it is an important migratory stop for birds traveling to northern nesting sites. At certain times of year, it is home for many mating birds including, double crested cormorant, seagulls, herring gull, ring billed gull, black-crowned night herons, great blue herons and great egrets.

Fisheries and Oceans Canada owns the island (and some of the surrounding water) and leases it to the Municipality of Saugeen Shores, Ontario. The Ontario region of the Canadian Wildlife Service manages the sanctuary.

The island is the location of one of the six Imperial Towers, the Chantry Island Lighthouse, which was constructed in 1859; the keeper's dwelling was built at the same time. Fully restored, both are listed on the Canadian Register of Historic Places.

Because the island is a bird sanctuary, only a single company, the Marine Heritage Society, has a permit to take visitors for a tour of the lightstation, several times a week from late May to mid-September; the rest of the island is off limits to such visitors.
