= Craigleith Provincial Park =

Provincial park in Ontario, Canada

- IUCN category II (national park)
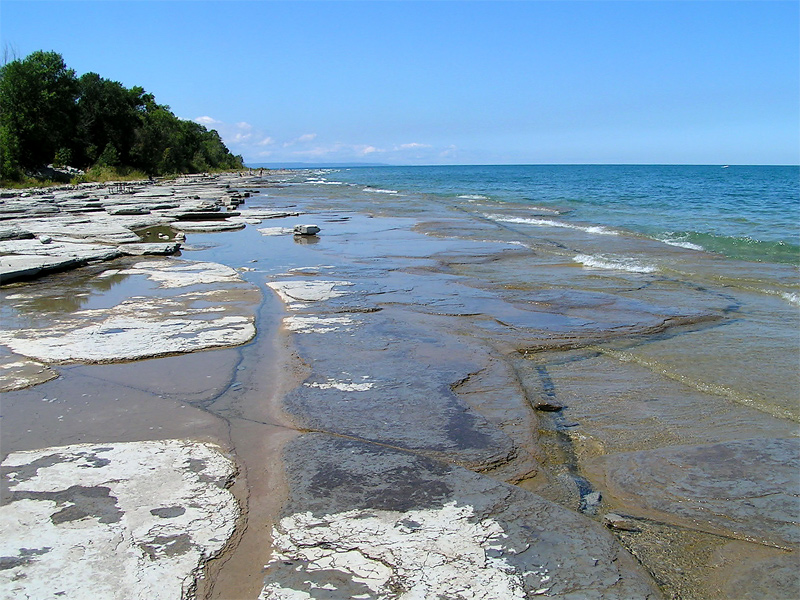
- Shore of Georgian Bay in the park

- Location within Southern Ontario
- Interactive map of Craigleith Provincial Park
- Location: Grey County, Ontario, Canada
- Nearest city: Collingwood
- Coordinates: 44°32′12″N 80°20′55″W
- Area: 00.66 km^{2} (0.25 sq mi)
- Established: 1967
- Visitors: 89,279 (in 2022)
- Governing body: Ontario Parks
- Website: www.ontarioparks.ca/park/craigleith

Craigleith Provincial Park was established in 1967 by Ontario Parks. It is a recreation-class provincial park created to help preserve historic oil shale beach. Craigleith Provincial Park is a small park located between Collingwood and Thornbury (10 kilometres (6.2 mi) west of Collingwood) on the southern shores of Georgian Bay.

== History ==
The park was created by Regulation 245/67, Schedule 59 of the Provincial Parks Act in 1967. The province acquired two parcels of land along Highway 26 as well as lands along former railway line. Only lands north of Highway 26 became an active park.

The park helps preserve a rare part of the Georgian Bay shoreline that is made-up of fractured plates of shale, containing 450 million year old fossils. There was a failed attempt in the mid 1800s to extract oil from the shale. This is commemorated by the Craigleith Shale Oil Works Historical Plaques in the park.

== Facilities ==
=== Park Office ===
The Park Office is located on Ontario Highway 26 near Blue Mountain ski resort. The park is open during the months of May to October.

=== Campgrounds ===
==== Main campground ====
The campground has 172 campsites of which 66 have electric service. There is a comfort station and shower building including laundry facilities and flush toilets. Potable water taps are also found at various locations outside the Day Use area. All the campsites in the camping area are within easy walking distance of the beach. A children's adventure playground is located next to the shower building. Firewood is available for purchase at the gatehouse next to the Park Store.

==== Day use ====
The park is open to day use and closed after 10pm daily after which only registered campers can remain overnight.

== Ecology ==
Fractured oil shale plates on the shore contain invertebrate fossils 455 million years old.

From 1859 to 1863 the Craigleith Shale Oil Works plant was opened by William Darley Pollard to the east of the park extracted bituminous oil shale. The process failed due inefficiency and the production closed shortly after 1863. The Craigleith Shale Oil Works Historical Plaques is located at the site.

Reminders in the park brochures remind visitors not to take any shale as souvenirs as the act of doing so is illegal.

== Shipwreck ==
The steamer Mary Ward, carrying coal oil, salt, and passengers from Sarnia to Collingwood, grounded off the shores of the park in 1872 after the captain mistook a tavern light for Collingwood harbour light. Eight people died and parts of the steamer are found near the site where it sank. Barrels of oil and pieces of furniture drifted to the Craigleith shore. In the winter when the bay froze over, men with horses salvaged what they could.

== See also ==
- List of Ontario provincial parks
