= Point Clark Lighthouse =

Lighthouse in Ontario, Canada

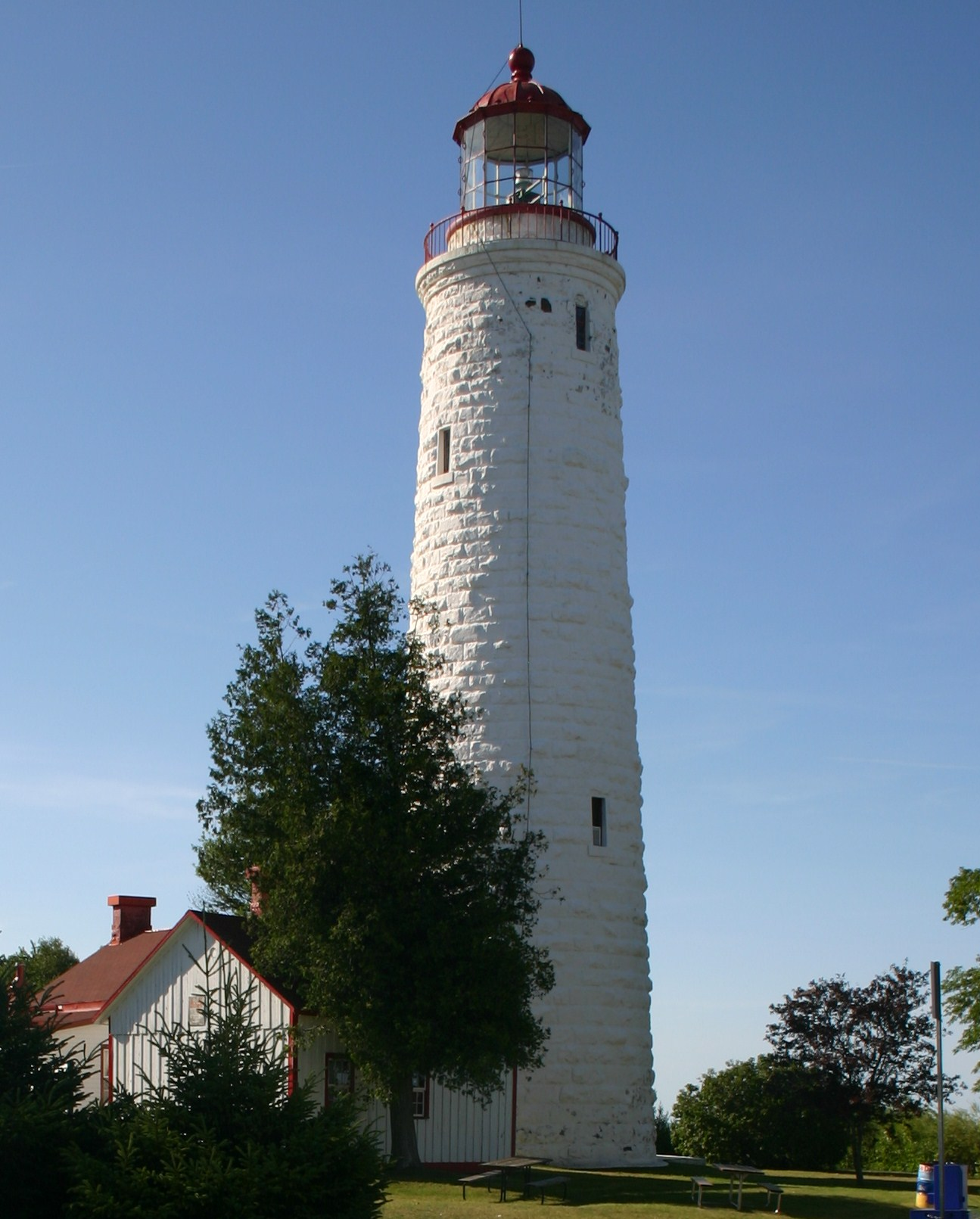
- The lighthouse in Point Clark
- Location: Huron-Kinloss, Canada
- Coordinates: 44.072854°N 81.757217°W

Tower
- Constructed: 1859
- Construction: limestone tower
- Automated: 1924
- Height: 26.5 metres (87 ft)
- Shape: cylindrical tower with balcony and lantern
- Markings: white tower, red lantern
- Operator: Township of Huron-Kinloss
- Heritage: national Historic Sites of Canada, classified federal heritage building of Canada, heritage lighthouse

Light
- Focal height: 28.3 metres (93 ft)
- Characteristic: Fl W 10s.

Point Clark Lighthouse is located in a beach community, Point Clark, Ontario, near a point that protrudes into Lake Huron. Built between 1855 and 1859 under the instructions of the Board of Works, Canada West, it is one of the few lighthouses on the Great Lakes to be made primarily from stone. It is one of the Imperial Towers, a group of six nearly identical towers built by contractor John Brown for the "Province of Canada" (Canadian government) on Lake Huron and Georgian Bay, all completed by 1859. The location for the Point Clark lighthouse was selected to warn sailors of the shoals (sandbars) 2 miles (3.2 km) off the Lake Huron coast. It is still functioning as an automated light. A restoration that eventually exceeded $2.3 million started in 2011 and the facility reopened for tourism in June 2015.

The origin of the designation Imperial is not certain, but some historians speculate that because the towers were public construction built under the colonial administration while Canada was a self-governing colony of Britain, the name would assure at least some funding from the British Empire's Board of Trade.

Since the lighthouse is on the mainland (not on an island) it can easily reached by bicycle or a vehicle. The original wooden storage building and keeper's house are a Township of Huron-Kinloss museum. The lightkeeper's home and the lighthouse can be toured from mid June to Labour Day for a fee.

The Point Clark tower was formally registered as one of the National Historic Sites of Canada, the only lighthouse on the Great Lakes or Georgian Bay to receive this highest-level designation. It has also been designated under the Heritage Lighthouse Protection Act. The keeper's cottage is a designated place of historic interest, and has been listed on the Canadian Register of Historic Places since 2008.

== History ==
Before the lighthouse was built, a lantern had been hung on a branch of a pine tree near the beach; this led to the settlement being called Pine Point. Like the nearby Chantry Island Lightstation Tower this one was built at a time when commercial shipping traffic was increasing on the Great Lakes between Canada and the U.S. because of new trade agreements and the opening of the Sault Ste. Marie Canal locks in 1855. Other towers were also built on Lake Huron and Georgian Bay between 1855 and 1859 to act as navigational aids for the ships.

Intended to warn ships about the point and about dangerous shoals in the area, construction started in 1857. The "second order" Fresnel lens was manufactured in Paris and installed by workmen from France. Much of the tower, and the keeper's house, was made of Dolomite limestone, much of it from a quarry about 60 kilometers from Point Clark. The walls are five feet thick at the base but only two feet near the top of the tower.

The light was first illuminated on 1 April 1859. In the early years, it was fueled with sperm oil as fuel but in 1860, that changed to colza oil; the latter was less expensive and allowed for the light to burn even on the coldest winter nights. The keeper was required to carry the fuel up the stairs in buckets. Electricity was used since 1863.

The first attempt in automating the light started in 1924. The new system was not considered adequately effective or reliable, so in 1926, it was removed and the original Fresnel lens was again used. The early revolving light mechanism was replaced with an electric motor in 1953. A light keeper was no longer required after 1963 when the light was fully automated. Its light characteristic is a single white flash every ten seconds, emitted at a focal plane height of 93 feet (28 m). The tower is owned by Parks Canada but the site is operated as a tourist attraction by the Township of Huron-Kinloss. The light operates under the control of the Canadian Coast Guard.

Like the other Imperial Towers on Lake Huron and Georgian Bay, it is among the few on the Great Lakes made of cut limestone and granite (not brick, wood, metal or concrete), with a functional design that is simple but elegant and pleasing to the eye.

After a $3.7 million reconstruction that lasted four years, the lighthouse and museum reopened for tours in June 2015. An announcement at the reopening ceremony indicated that the Point Clark lighthouse had been designated under the Heritage Lighthouse Protection Act because of its "significant heritage value".

== Lighthouse design ==
The tower is 110 feet (34 m) tall, made primarily of cut limestone brought from Inverhuron by barge, but a section near the top is made of granite for extra rigidity. There are 114 steps from the bottom to the lantern room. The 12 sided cast iron lantern was first lit on April 1, 1859 and is 87 feet (27 m) from the base of the tower.

The light keeper's house, resembling a British stone cottage, is a Recognized Federal Heritage Building, a place of historic interest. The July 14, 1994 summary praises its symmetry, excellent build quality, pleasing appearance and practical design.

== The Lightkeepers ==
The job of light keeper was an attractive one and positions were often filled on the basis of affiliation with the current political party in power. After WWI and WWII however, preference was given to war veterans. The keeper was required to maintain the property, clean and whitewash the tower as required, and maintain the light. In the years before electricity and automation, he was also required to carry the fuel up the stairs in buckets, and, twice a day, to wind up the clockwork-like mechanism—with weights and pulleys—that enabled the weights to rotate the lens.

The following individuals were responsible for the lighthouse and its property over the years:

- John Young 1859–1882
- David Small 1883
- John Rae 1883–1896
- Murdock McDonald 1897–1914
- George H. Ray 1914–1924
- John E. Ruttle 1926–1938
- John A. Campbell 1938–1946
- John C. Campbell 1947–1962

In 1875, John Young's salary would have been approximately $400 per annum, based on published data for the salary at the Chantry Island Lightstation that year. (Another report indicates $435 per annum but does not state the year; that amount may have been paid in a later year.) On retirement after 20 years, Young's pension was $19.25.

After the light was automated, Elmer MacKenzie was retained as a part-time caretaker for the property (1963-1964) at a salary of $75 per year. Some sources discuss subsequent caretakers Elden Lowry (1964-1967) and Joe Burke. Currently, the light produces a white flash every 10 seconds.

== See also ==
- List of lighthouses in Ontario
- List of lighthouses in Canada
- Category:Lighthouses on the National Historic Sites of Canada register
- History of Lighthouses in Canada
- Heritage Lighthouse Protection Act
