= Erie Belle =

19th century steamship

Coordinates: 44.156741°N 81.658997°W

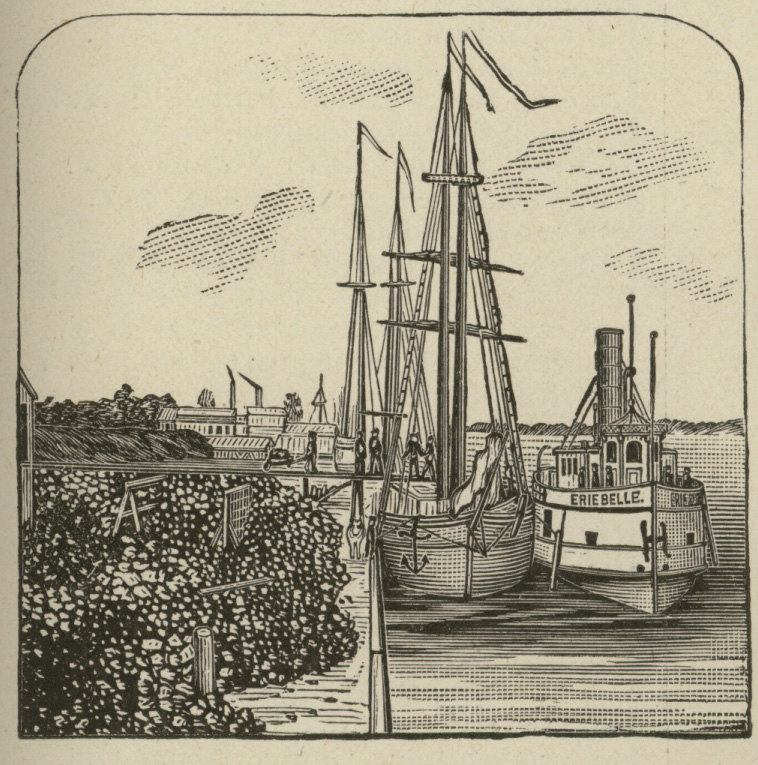
- An engraving of the Erie Belle (right) alongside a schooner at a coal yard, published after the ship's loss.

History
- Name: Hector (1862–1879); Erie Belle (1879–1883)
- Owner: Daniel B. Odette (1879–1883)
- Builder: Peck & Masters, Cleveland, Ohio
- Launched: 1862
- Fate: Boiler exploded, November 21, 1883

General characteristics
- Type: Tug
- Length: 117 ft (36 m)
- Beam: 20 ft (6.1 m)
- Propulsion: 150 hp steam engine
- Crew: 12

The Erie Belle was a Great Lakes steam ship that exploded along the eastern shore of Lake Huron in 1883. The rusting remains of the ship's boiler lie on a beach south of Kincardine, Ontario.

== Service history ==
Originally known as the Hector, the Erie Belle was built in 1862 in Cleveland, Ohio by Peck & Masters, to serve as a wrecking tug on Lake Ontario. In 1873 the tug sank in the Detroit River and was raised and returned to service. In 1879 Hector was sold to Daniel B. Odette of Windsor, registered as a Canadian ship, renamed Erie Belle, and reconfigured or housed in as a passenger and package freight steamer. As Erie Belle the ship served ports on the Canadian side of the western end of Lake Erie. Within a short time she sank again near Kingsville, Ontario after striking the fluke of another ship's anchor. She was raised and once again rebuilt as a tug.

== Demise ==
A two-week period beginning on 11 November 1883, saw several powerful storms hit the east shore of Lake Huron. The schooner J. N. Carter was southward bound with a load of timber on November 15 when it overshot Kincardine harbour, and then grounded off shore two miles south of Kincardine as it attempted to turn and head north. The Erie Belle was sent to salvage the J. N. Carter and arrived on the morning of 21 November. Tow ropes were attached, but the Erie Belle was initially was unable to move the stranded schooner. During this operation, the Erie Belle's boiler exploded. While there are no reliable accounts of what caused the boiler to explode, a common theory is that the relief valve was wired shut in order to produce more steam, and as the engine over-heated and began to seize — further impeding the release of steam — the pressure reached the bursting point. Four crewmen died in the ensuing explosion and two died days later of injuries, while the remaining crew were blown overboard and rescued by the crew of the J. N. Carter. The J. N. Carter was left to sit out the remainder of the winter, frozen in place. Its cargo of lumber was unloaded over the ice and the ship was freed the following spring. She continued service on the Great Lakes until eventually foundering in the Mississagi Strait in the late 1890s.

== The boiler ==
Following the explosion, the remains of the ship were dragged closer to shore and disassembled, leaving the boiler about 20 metres offshore. An illegal attempt to salvage the boiler then pulled it to its current position close to the shoreline. Depending on the level of the lake from year to year, the boiler can be completely out of the water, or in shallow water within a metre of shore. The beach where the boiler now rests partly buried in sand, about 2 kilometres (1.2 mi) south of Kincardine's harbour, is named Boiler Beach.

The largest visible part of the boiler is the outer casing of the fire box, the lower end of the boiler, which is oriented toward the south. The boiler is resting on what was originally the side through which fuel would have been stoked into the firebox, buried in the sand up to 1 m deep. The base of the flue, which would have carried smoke and exhaust gasses to the ship's funnel, is now nearly buried in the sand and points to the north. Between the flue and the firebox is a tangled, broken area that would have originally held the flue end of fire tubes. The shell, a large portion of the boiler containing the fire tubes, is missing, believed destroyed in the explosion.
