= Mary Ward (ship) =

History
- Name: Mary Rose
- Fate: Wrecked near Craigleith on November 24, 1872.

General characteristics
- Class & type: Steamboat
- Length: 120 ft
- Beam: 18 ft

The Mary Ward was a passenger and cargo steamer built in Montreal in 1865. She ran aground on a reef in November 1872, and was subsequently wrecked in a storm.

== History ==
The Mary Ward was built in 1865 for service on the Great Lakes, carrying goods and passengers between Montreal and Chicago. The ship caught fire on Lake St. Clair and had to be repaired. She soon returned to active service and continued to ply the Lakes for a few more years without incident.

In 1872, the Mary Ward was purchased by businessmen in Owen Sound for a sum of around $18,000. On November 22 of that year, the ship left Sarnia for Collingwood, her new home port, with a cargo of coal, oil, and salt. At a stop-off in Tobermory, passengers were picked up from the Cumberland, whose captain had decided it was too late to brave the waters of Lake Superior as originally planned.

At around 9 p.m. on November 24, for reasons that were never established, the captain of the Mary Ward erred from the correct course, and the ship ran aground on Milligan's Reef, four kilometres off Northwinds Beach in Craigleith. Since the damage was not substantial, and the waters were calm, the passengers and crew decided to remain aboard and wait for help to arrive. Shortly after midnight, however, the weather began to turn, and by morning a fierce storm was blowing. Increasingly desperate, eight men made for shore in a lifeboat, but were quickly engulfed by the waves.

The direction of the wind was deterring any rescue attempts from Collingwood, but eventually three fishing boats from nearby Thornbury were able to reach the stranded vessel. The surviving 19 people were rescued, with the only further casualty being the ship's dog. The Mary Ward eventually broke up and sank.

The rescuers were rewarded for their efforts by the Canadian government. On the 100th anniversary of the disaster, a plaque commemorating the Mary Ward was unveiled in Craigleith Provincial Park.
