= Imperial Towers =

Group of lighthouses on Lake Huron, Canada

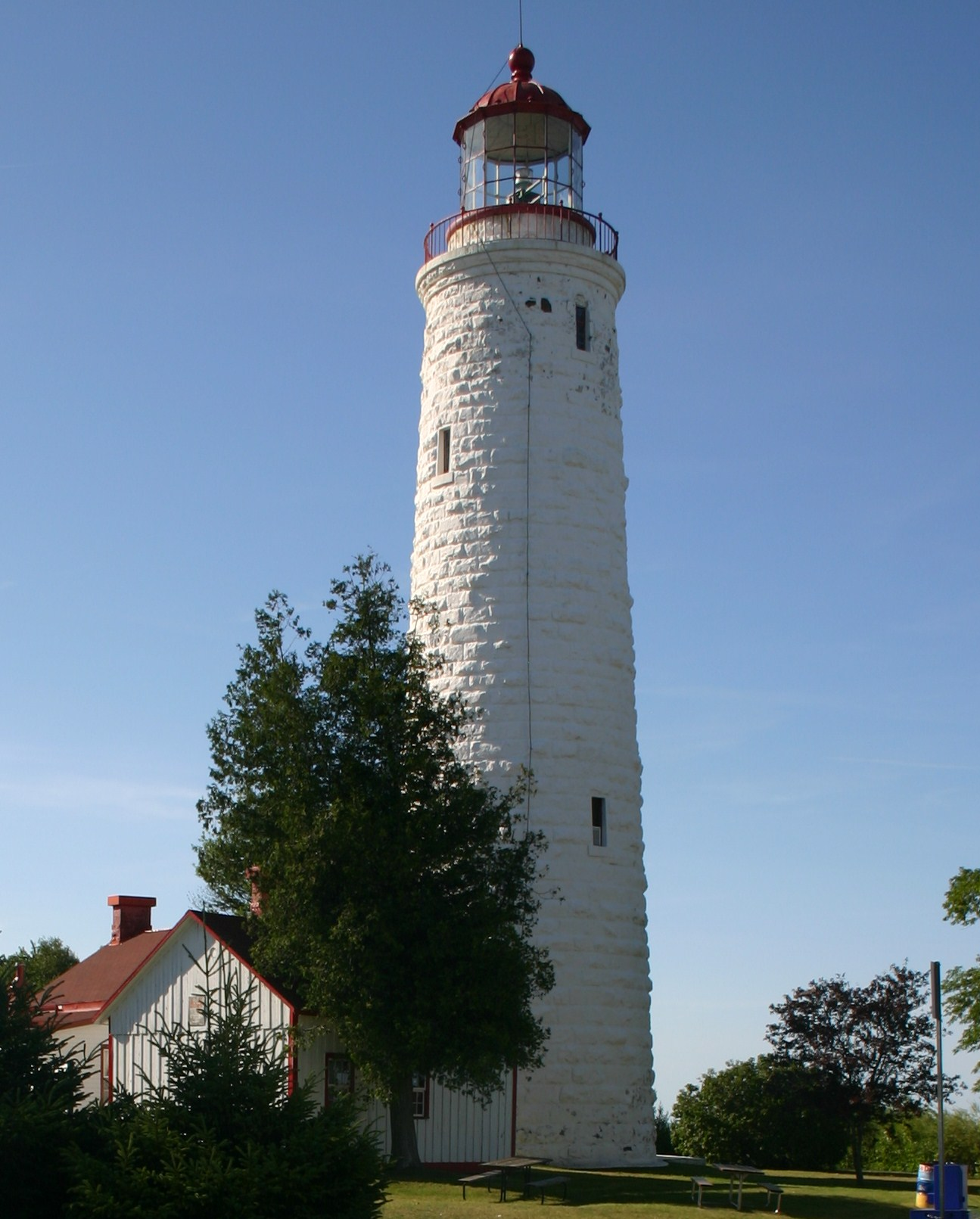
Point Clark Lighthouse

The Imperial Towers of Ontario were six of the earliest lighthouses built on Lake Huron and Georgian Bay, all constructed primarily of stone, by the Province of Canada. The origin of the designation Imperial is not certain, but some historians speculate that because the towers were public construction built under the colonial administration while Canada was a self-governing colony of Britain, the name would assure at least some funding from the British Empire's Board of Trade.

All were built at a time when commercial shipping traffic was increasing on the Great Lakes between Canada and the U.S. because of new trade agreements and the opening of the Sault Ste. Marie Canal locks in 1855. The settlement of the Bruce Peninsula was already well underway at the time, also making the lighthouses timely as navigational aids for the boats and ships. All are currently operating as automated lights.

== History ==
In 1855, John Brown, a builder from Thorold, Ontario, was contracted to build eleven lighthouses and keepers' dwellings on Lake Huron and Georgian Bay between Point Clark and Christian Bay.

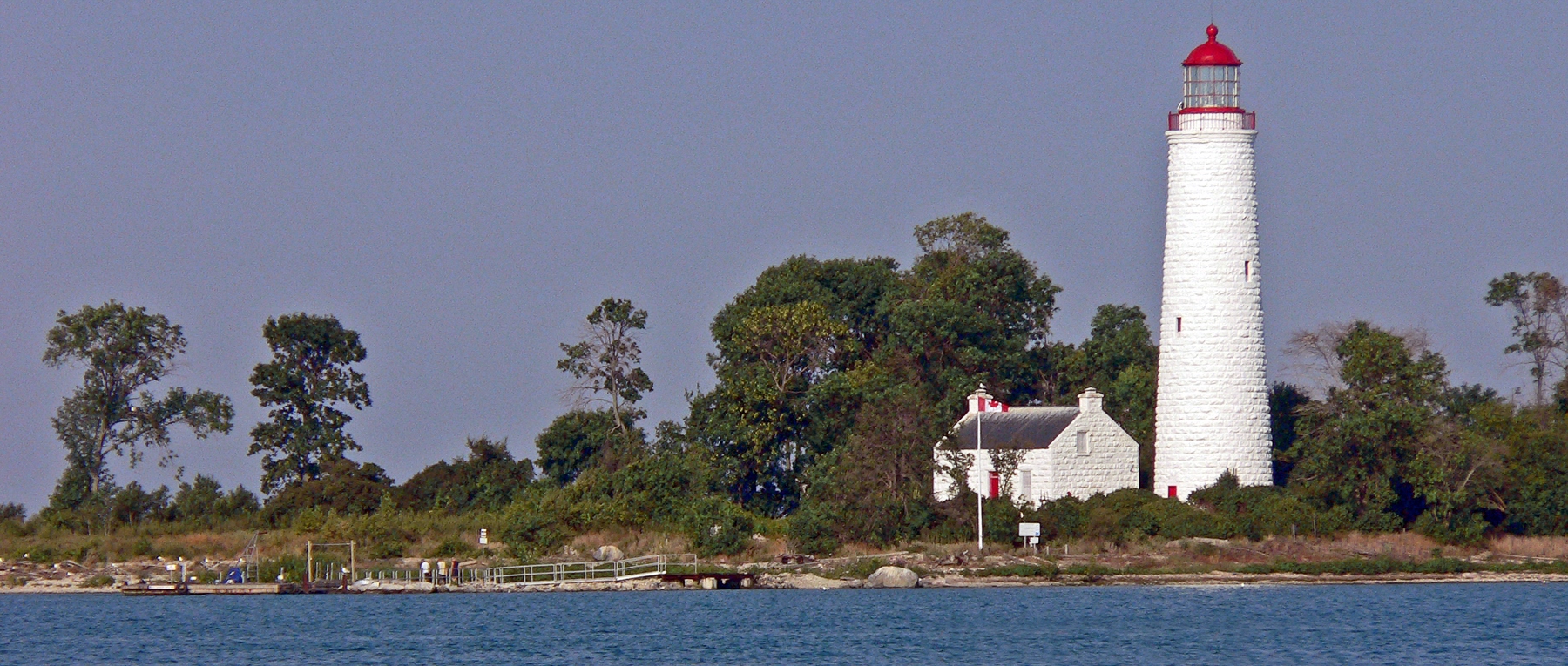
Chantry Island Lighthouse

Eventually, only six of the towers were completed. These were:

- Point Clark Lighthouse 44.07281°N 81.75731°W
- Chantry Island Lightstation Tower 44.48938°N 81.40194°W
- Cove Island Light 45.32699°N 81.73505°W
- Nottawasaga Island Light 44.53656°N 80.25702°W
- Griffith Island Light 44.85058°N 80.89137°W This light was originally contracted to be built on Point William 10 nautical miles SE of Griffiths Island.
- Christian Island Light 44.78664°N 80.15607°W

All six were built between 1855 and 1859 and all were lit by 1859; for the most part, their construction was simultaneous and the design virtually identical, although the Christian Island Light is not as tall as the others. Cove Island was the first to be lit, on October 30, 1858; construction on Christian Island was the first to be started but this Light was the last to be lit, on May 1, 1859. (The projects cancelled were to be at White Fish Island, Mississagi Strait, Isle St. Joseph, Clapperton Island and Badgley Island.)

The locations of the towers were chosen based on known traffic patterns; each tower marked a prominent navigational hazard which was already well-recognized. Sites were also chosen based on their proximity to good anchorages. The projects cancelled were to be at White Fish Island, Mississagi Strait, Isle St. Joseph, Clapperton Island and Badgley Island.

== Construction ==
Construction of the lights was plagued by difficulties. Brown lost four full supply boats, all of which sank before reaching their destinations and unloading. More supplies were lost from being swept overboard during storms and rough seas. Furthermore, delivery of the lighting apparatus for each tower was delayed by competing demand from lighthouse expansion in the United States and a bottleneck in the delivery of the lenses. The Fresnel lenses were made by the Louis Sautter Company of Paris and installed by specialist workmen from France. The most powerful (second-order) lenses were used at Point Clark, Chantry, Cove and Nottawasaga Island.

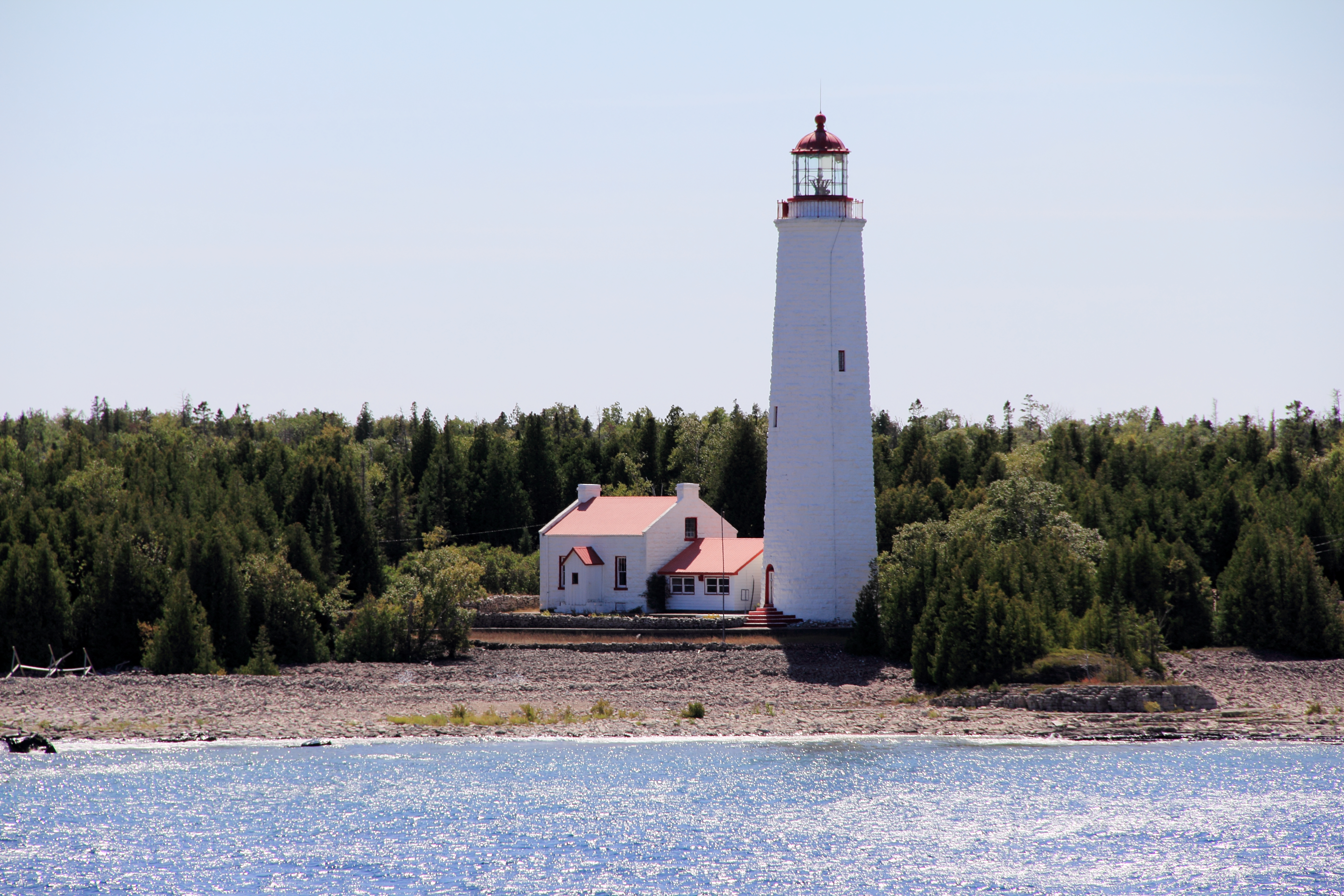
Cove Island tower and keeper's dwelling

Consequently, Brown was facing bankruptcy by 1857, and petitioned the provincial government for assistance. Presumably, the government responded favorably since he completed all six and remained in business until his death. By 1859 all six towers were lit. The final cost was approximately $223,000, a massive sum in that era.

== Description ==
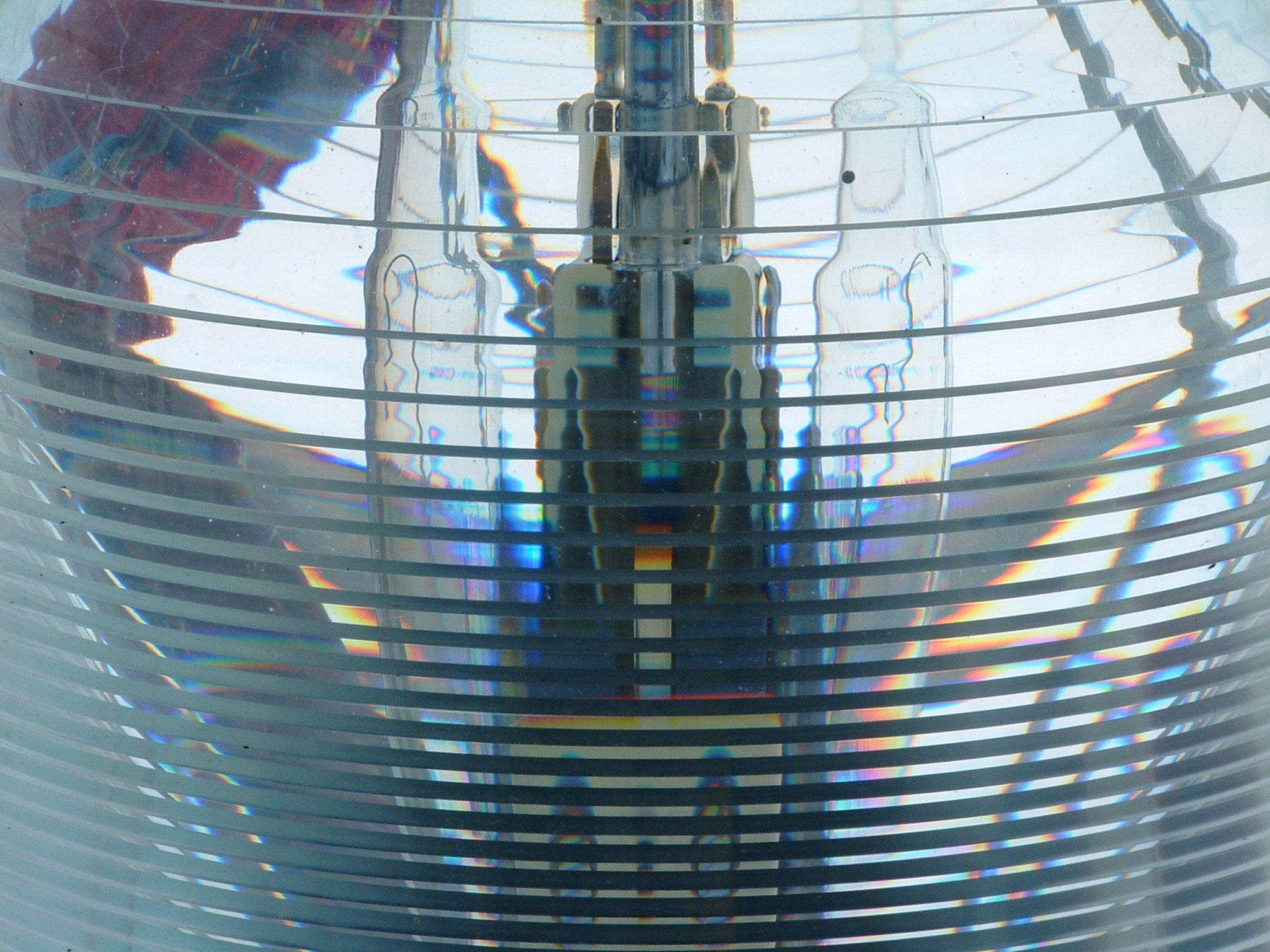
Chantry Fresnel Lens

Only minor variations exist in the design of the six towers, as was required for the different building sites. They are all 80 feet (24 m) tall, with the exception of Christian Island, a 55-foot (17 m) tower. The rock courses at the bottom of the towers reach some seven feet thick, and the walls at ground level are six feet thick, tapering towards two feet thickness at the top. Though the lighthouses are conical, their interior diameter is 10'6'' throughout.

The towers and dwellings are constructed of limestone, with a granite section near the top of the tower for extra rigidity to support the lantern rooms. Most other lighthouses of the era were built of brick, wood, iron or concrete. The lanterns are made of copper alloys, glass, and cast iron.

The towers are whitewashed and painted with red trim. Each was initially equipped with a Fresnel lens; they were the first Canadian lighthouses so equipped.

According to the Heritage Character Statement from the Government of Canada (for the nearly identical Chantry Island light), the design is very strong and somewhat ornate.

As of 2017, all six towers are still standing and are functioning as automated lights. Three have been extensively restored. Griffith (on a private island) and especially Nottawasaga are deteriorating due to lack of maintenance. A fundraising effort is underway to restore the Nottawasaga light. The Christian Island light, located on Beausoleil First Nation lands, also requires restoration.

== Other Imperial lighthouses in Canada ==
Other Imperial Lights were built in the 1860s usually of rock shipped from Scotland, at Lotbinière, Quebec (1860); Pointe-aux-Trembles, Quebec (1862); L'Islet, Quebec (1865); Port St. Francis, Quebec on Lake St. Peter (1865); Isle aux Prunes opposite Verchères, Quebec (1866); and a movable lighthouse at Isle aux Raisins, Quebec (1867). Four towers were built along the approaches to the Saint Lawrence: at fr:Cap-des-Rosiers on the Gaspe peninsula; in the Strait of Belle Isle; at Pointe Amour near L'Anse Amour on the Labrador coast; and at West Point on Anticosti Island. Other imperial towers are Mohawk Island (Gull Island), Lake Erie, built in 1848 by John Brown and Government historians list Bois Blanc near Amherstburg Ont built before that as also being an imperial tower.

The imperial towers were originally spelt with a small "i" and this is the definition of an imperial tower - Webster's Dictionary 1904-1951. imperial : In architecture, designating a form of dome or roof, as used in a Moorish buildings. imperial: In architecture, a kind of dome which viewed in profile, pointed toward the top and widens as it descends, as in Moorish buildings; an imperial dome.

== Sources ==
- Sapulski, Wayne; |The Imperial Towers of Lake Huron and Georgian Bay, 1996
- Berger, T. & Dempster, D.; Lighthouses of the Great Lakes; Voyageur 2002
- Crompton, W. & Rhein, M. The Ultimate Book of Lighthouses; Thunder Bay 2003
- Weaver, H.; John Brown's Imperial Towers: End of an Era; Inland Sea; 1992
- Wright, Larry Articles and Great Lakes Lighthouse Encyclopedia -

== See also ==
- History of Lighthouses in Canada
- List of lighthouses in Ontario
- List of lighthouses in Canada
- Heritage Lighthouse Protection Act
