= Chantry Island Lighthouse =

Lighthouse in Ontario, Canada

Chantry Island Lightstation Tower
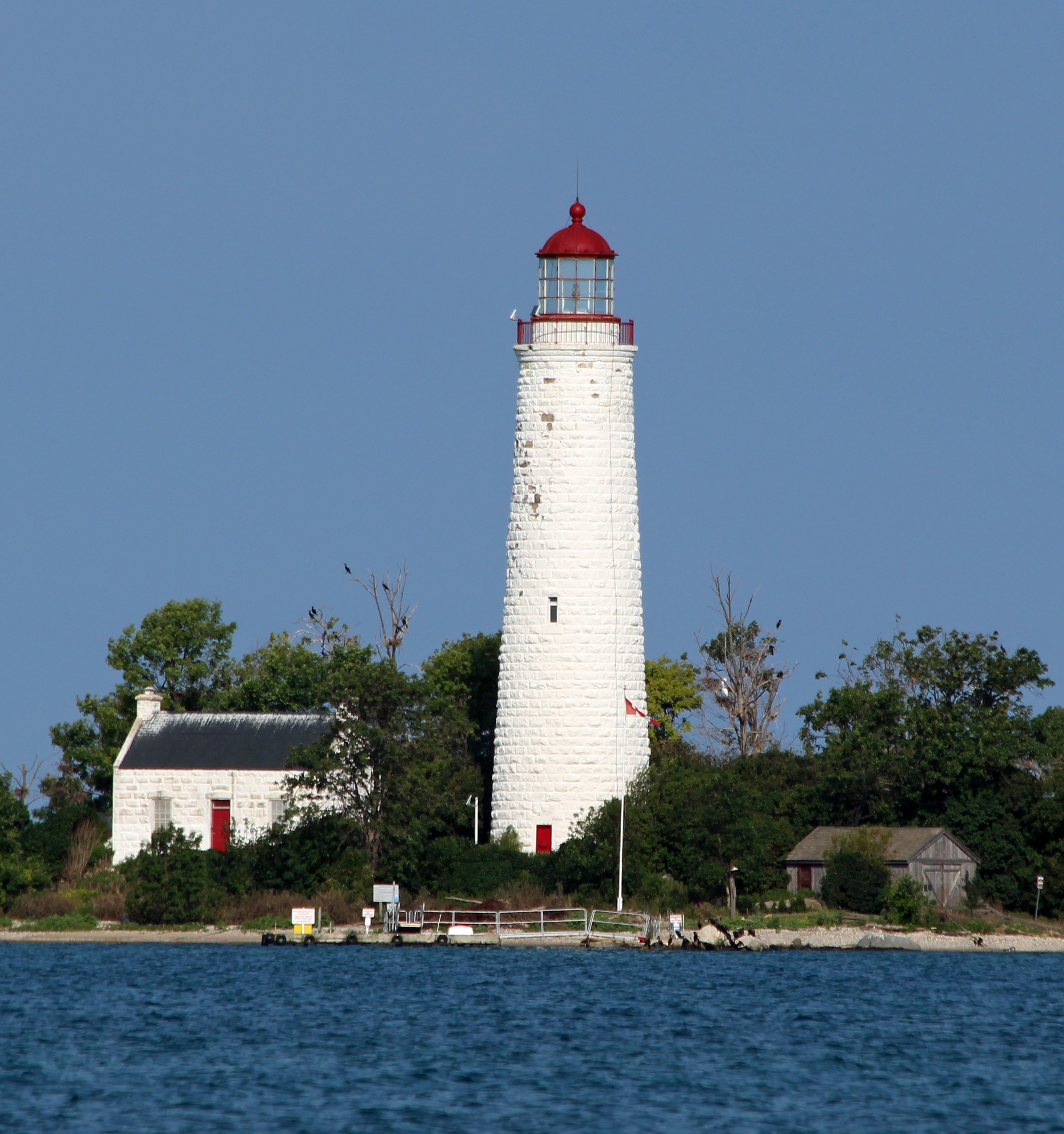
- Keepers dwelling, lighthouse and shed
- Location: Chantry Island; Ontario; Canada
- Coordinates: 44°29′22″N 81°24′07″W

Tower
- Constructed: 1859
- Construction: limestone tower
- Automated: 1954
- Height: 26 metres (85 ft)
- Shape: cylindrical tower with balcony and lantern
- Markings: white tower, red lantern
- Power source: solar power
- Operator: Canadian Wildlife Service (Ontario Region); Marine Heritage Society
- Heritage: classified federal heritage building of Canada

Light
- First lit: 1857
- Focal height: 31 metres (102 ft)
- Lens: Fresnel lens
- Range: 6 nautical miles (11 km; 6.9 mi)
- Characteristic: Fl W 4s.

The Chantry Island Lighthouse, officially known as Chantry Island Lightstation Tower, is a lightstation on Chantry Island, off the coast of Southampton, Ontario, in Lake Huron. It was constructed in the years 1855 through to 1859, by John Brown of Thorold, Ontario, under the authority of the Province of Canada and is recognized as one of the six Imperial Towers. Virtually identical, they were completed in 1858–1859 on Lake Huron and Georgian Bay and are among the few lighthouses on the Great Lakes made of cut limestone and granite (not brick, metal, wood or concrete).

This lighthouse was planned in about 1850 because underwater shoals of massive granite boulders made navigation in the area dangerous. There are many accounts from the 1800s on of disasters and lost lives in this area of Lake Huron. The first beacon on the island (1857) was provided by a temporary fixed light which was replaced by the tower. The actual lighthouse was first lit on 1 April 1859. Valuable in its day, it still emits a bright beam, but now, buoys and modern navigational tools are more important for safe navigation.

The tower and the keeper's dwelling have been extensively restored. The dwelling is listed on the Canadian Register of Historic Places while the Lightstation Tower is listed on the National Historic Sites of Canada. However, because the island is a bird sanctuary, only one company has a license to offer tours of the property and only on a limited basis. All other access to the island is prohibited.

== History and design ==
The origin of the Imperial designation is not certain, but some historians speculate that because the towers were public construction built under the colonial administration while Canada was a self-governing colony of Britain, the name would assure at least some funding from the British Empire's Board of Trade. All six Imperial towers on Lake Huron and Georgian Bay, along with a limestone lightkeeper's dwelling, were constructed by John Brown, a contractor and stonemason from Thorold, Ontario.

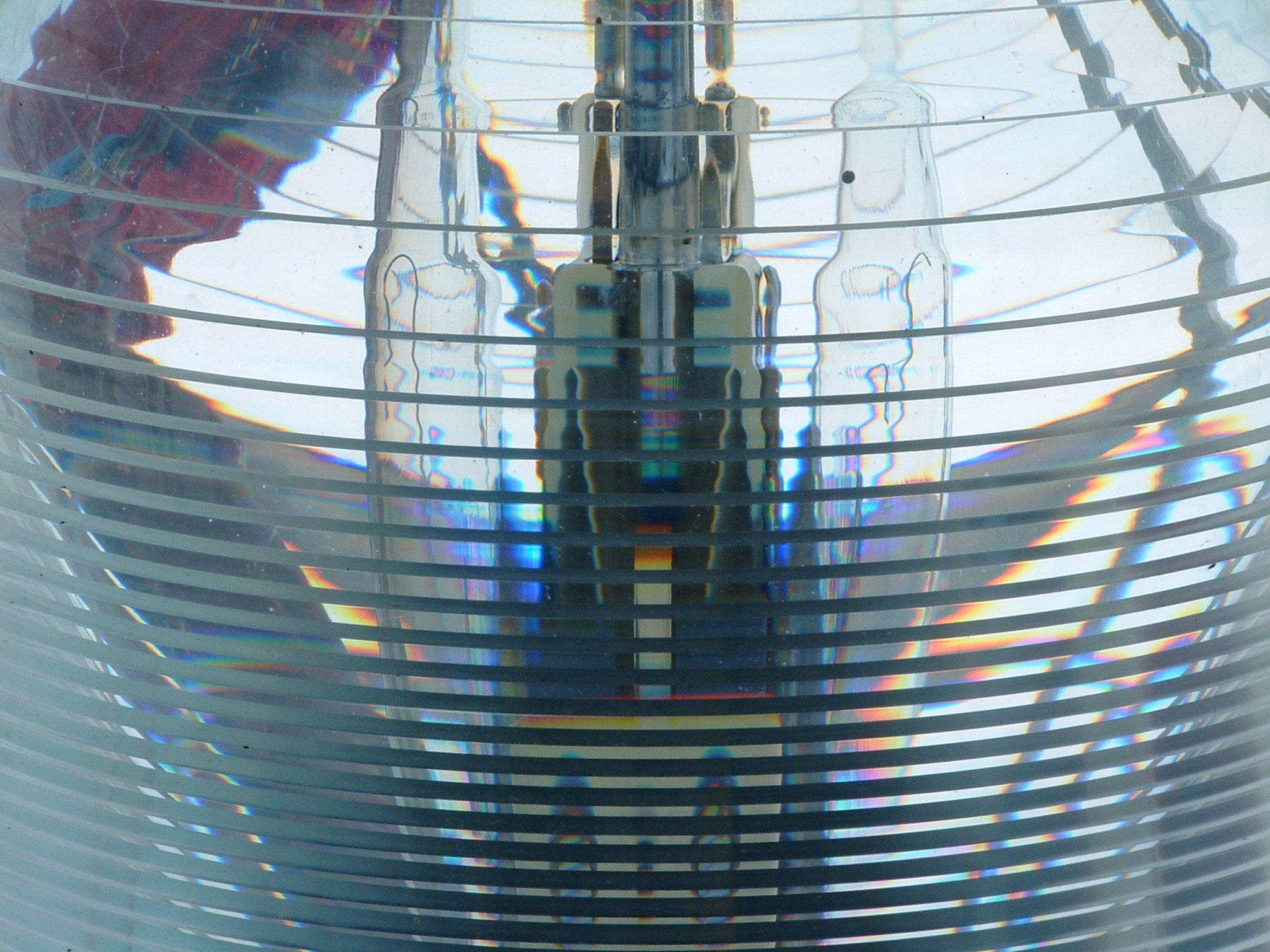
The Chantry tower's Fresnel lens

The tower on Chantry Island is 85 feet (26 m) tall, with a focal plane height of 102 feet (31 m). It is made of limestone reinforced with lumber, and the top section is made of granite for extra rigidity. There are 115 steps from the bottom to the lantern room. According to the Heritage Character Statement from the Government of Canada, the tower's design is very strong. The report discusses the "magnificent twelve-sided polygonal lantern" and the various ornate features. The gallery at the top is a round tapered and corbelled base that houses the 12-sided polygonal Fresnel lantern, which includes three rows of rectangular glass panes. The Fresnel lens was originally developed for lighthouses by French physicist Augustin-Jean Fresnel. All of the lenses for the Imperial Towers were manufactured by the Louis Sautter Company of Paris. The powerful (second-order) lens was installed by specialist workmen from France. In 1859, Sperm oil was burned to illuminate the lamps but in 1860, a switch was made to colza oil since it was less expensive and more reliable in the coldest weather.

The light was fully automated in 1954; the second-order Fresnel lens remained in use and emits a single white flash every four seconds. Currently, the light is solar powered and operates under the control of the Canadian Coast Guard. The Government of Canada is the owner of the light station.

== The lightkeepers ==
The keeper was required to maintain the property, clean and whitewash the tower as required, and maintain the light. In the years before electricity and automation, he was also required to carry the fuel up the stairs in buckets, and, twice a day, to wind up the clockwork-like mechanism—with weights and pulleys—that enabled the weights to rotate the lens. In 1875, the Chantry station's keeper was paid a salary of $400, according to House of Commons records.

The following individuals were the keepers of the lightstation over the years:

- Duncan McGregor Lambert, 1858–1880
- William McGregor Lambert, 1880–1907
- Malcolm McIver, 1908–1916
- John Klippert, 1917–1937
- Clayton Knetchel, 1937–1941
- Alfred Huber, 1941
- Cameron Spencer, 1942–1954

Before the lightstation's completion and opening, Robert Mills cared for the temporary fixed light for the previous season.

In August 1892, William McGregor Lambert, the son of the first lightkeeper, was recognized by the Canadian Government for his lifesaving efforts after the schooner Nettie Woodward capsized. He was credited with the rescue of 20 people, was awarded a gold watch and a bronze medal for his heroic efforts. After he became the keeper, Lambert developed Chantry Island Lightstation Tower and the island as a visitor showplace with one of the first marine museums on the Great Lakes. On retiring, he received the Imperial Service Medal.

== Historic designation ==
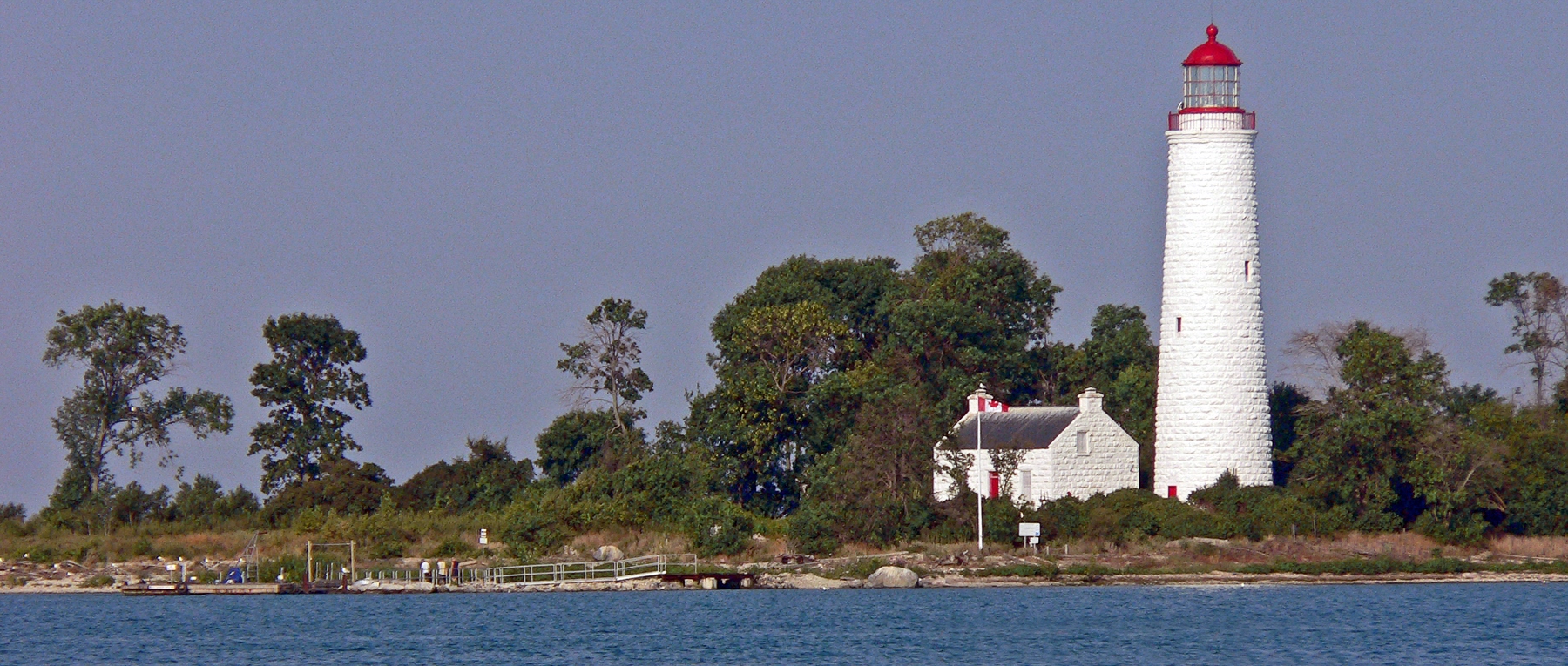
Chantry Island lighthouse and keeper's cottage, after the renovations, from the licensed tour boat

The Chantry lighthouse is a significant landmark. It was built at a time when commercial shipping traffic was increasing on the Great Lakes between Canada and the U.S. because of new trade agreements and the opening of the Sault Ste. Marie Canal locks in 1855. The Bruce Peninsula was also open to settlement by 1850, making the lighthouses timely. The other Imperial Towers were also built in the same era, including the nearby Point Clark Lighthouse, to act as navigational aids for the ships. Like those, the Chantry tower was made primarily of cut stone with a functional design that is simple but elegant and pleasing to the eye.

The tower first became one of the National Historic Sites of Canada on 14 November 1991, when it was designated as a Classified Federal Heritage Building in the Directory of Federal Heritage Designations. The relevant documents discuss its historical, architectural and environmental value. It was formally listed on the Canadian Register of Historic Places (reference # 4463) on 22 July 2005.

The restored lightkeeper's dwelling, resembling a traditional Scottish stone cottage, was recognized as historic in 2009 and formally listed on the Canadian Register of Historic Places on 12 February 2014.

Like the three other lighthouses in Saugeen Shores, Ontario, this station was nominated under the Heritage Lighthouse Protection Act. The other three were subsequently designated as protected under the Act in 2012. The Chantry Island site has yet to be designated. The Act requires ownership of a light station to be first transferred from the federal government to another entity, such as the Town, which did take over ownership of the other lighthouses. That transfer has not occurred because of the uncertainty created by First Nations land claims to islands in the Lake Huron basin. In the meantime, the Chantry Island light station is leased to the Town and sublet to the Marine Heritage Society.

== The lightkeeper's cottage ==
The lightkeeper's dwelling is considered a familiar landmark on its own merits, while being a supportive functional role to the lighthouse tower. The 1 1/2-storey 19th-century residence has a slate-clad gable roof, stone walls, parapet roof ends and stout chimneys and stands adjacent to the tower. The building had a simple interior design featuring a symmetrical three-bay facade, with a central door, flanking windows with two smaller gable end windows, a small vestibule, with interior doors to both the left and right, a wooden staircase that leads directly upstairs to two loft bedrooms positioned on the right, with a single large room with living area and kitchen, to the left a parlour with a small bedroom which reflected the Classic British influence. This design was more spacious than most frontier homes, which showed the importance of the occupants; the dwelling provided a good example of the traditional Scottish cottage of the 18th and early 19th century. After automation of the lighthouse in 1954, the keeper's dwelling collapsed.

Between 1997 and 2001 the dwelling was restored by the Marine Heritage Society; the craftsmanship and materials for the restoration are considered very good. To complete restorations, 31 giant hemlock trees were harvested, milled and transported to the island as commercial wood was not available. The walls of the dwelling were rebuilt by mason Bill Robinson, hemlock lumber was used to construct new floors, the loft and the roof. Included in the restoration was the rebuilding of the boat house, restored privy and the planting of historic gardens. The site has evolved from a keeper's home to a farmstead to a tourist attraction; the dwelling changed through restoration and construction with the removal of building additions. In August 2001, a grand opening for the restored lightkeeper's dwelling was held on the island recognizing over 300,000 hours of labour and over 250 volunteers for their dedication and work. Associated with the establishment of the Southampton village in Ontario, the lightstation played a key role in the growth of the port, with the keeper's dwelling recognized as a heritage asset by the municipality of Saugeen Shores.

In the years after work on the cottage was completed (2001), subsequent restoration work was done on the property. Volunteers restored the stairs inside the lighthouse tower as well as the keeper's privy and have added a boathouse and a replica boat.

== Tourism ==
Because Chantry Island is a Federal Migratory Bird Sanctuary, only a single company, the Marine Heritage Society, has a permit to operate tours of the lighthouse and the keeper's dwelling; such visitors must not leave the lightstation property. The tours run several times a week (using a small boat) from late-May to mid-September, leaving from the ticket office by the fishing boat docks. Otherwise, no access to the island is permitted.

The Bruce County Museum and Cultural Centre in Southampton, Ontario, has some artifacts and archival material about the Chantry lightstation in its collection. Some of it is included in a permanent exhibit, Captivating Coastline.

== See also ==
- List of lighthouses in Ontario
- List of lighthouses in Canada
- Great Lakes Storm of 1913
- Heritage Lighthouse Protection Act
