= Heritage Lighthouse Protection Act =

Canadian act

Senate of Canada
- Long title: An Act to protect heritage lighthouses
- Citation: S.C. 2008, c. 16
- Considered by: Senate of Canada
- Considered by: House of Commons of Canada
- Royal assent: May 29, 2008
- Commenced: May 29, 2010

Legislative history

Initiating chamber: Senate of Canada
- Bill citation: Bill S-215
- Introduced by: Patricia Carney
- First reading: October 30, 2007
- Second reading: December 6, 2007
- Third reading: December 13, 2007

Revising chamber: House of Commons of Canada
- Member(s) in charge: Larry Miller
- First reading: January 31, 2008
- Second reading: March 11, 2008
- Third reading: May 1, 2008
- Status: Current legislation

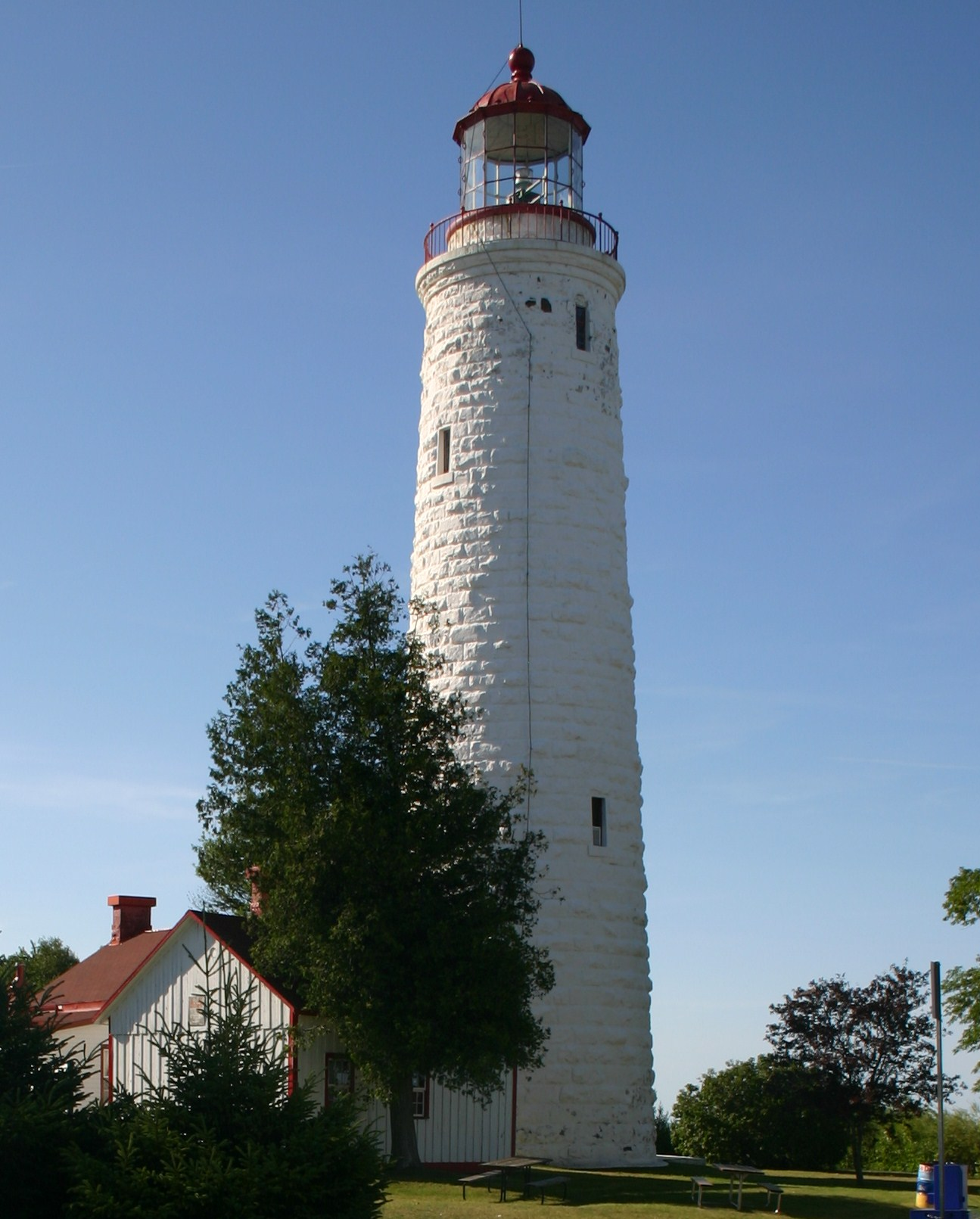
Point Clark Lighthouse, Ontario, designated in 2015

The Heritage Lighthouse Protection Act (French: Loi sur la protection des phares patrimoniaux) is an Act of the Parliament of Canada (designated Bill S-215) for the designation and preservation of historically significant Canadian lighthouses. It was passed by the Canadian Parliament in May 2008. The act set up a public nomination process and sets heritage building conservation standards for lighthouses which are officially designated. First introduced in 2000 as Bill S-21 in the Senate of Canada the bill enjoyed consistent multi-party support despite the unpredictable legislative agendas of minority Parliaments and was repeatedly re-introduced. The final vote of approval was made by the Canadian Senate in 2008 and the bill received Royal Assent on May 29, 2008.

The Heritage Lighthouse Protection Act (S.C. 2008, c. 16) came into effect on May 29, 2010, and established a deadline of May 29, 2012 to nominate lighthouses for heritage designation. However an announcement in June 2010 to declare almost all Canadian lighthouses as surplus caused critics to accuse the Canadian Coast Guard of emasculating the bill.

The first designations under the Act were announced on 3 August 2012: the St. Paul Island (Nova Scotia) in Dingwall, and three in Saugeen Shores, Ontario, McNab Point and both the Front and Rear Range lights at the Saugeen River Front. As of February 2017, a total of 92 lighthouses had been designated.

== Origins ==
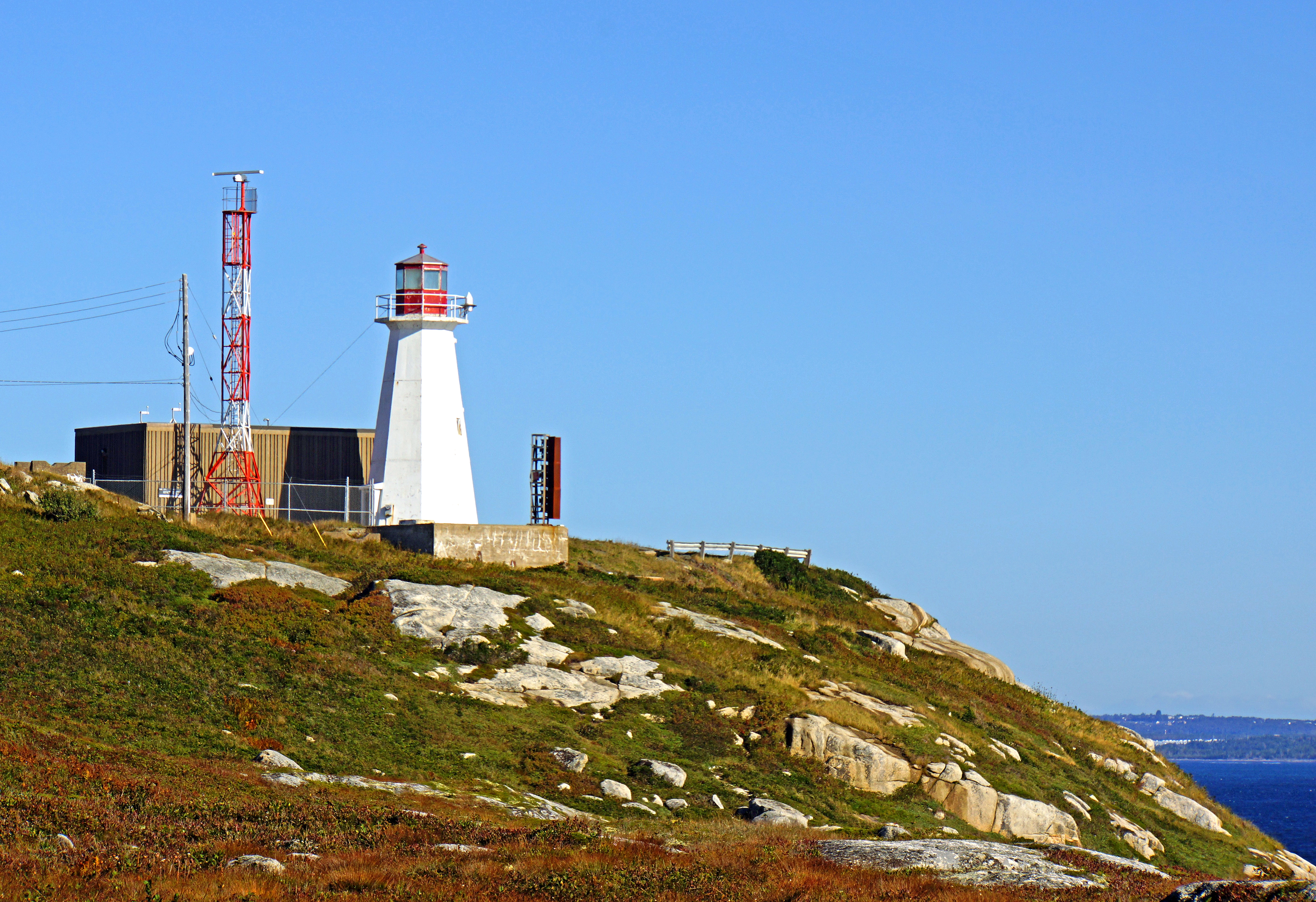
Chebucto Head Lighthouse, at left where the Lighthouse Protection act campaign was launched

With the world's largest coastline, Canada built a large network of lighthouses and developed a uniquely Canadian style of lighthouses following Confederation in 1867. Advances in navigational technology have lessened the critical navigational role of lighthouses while at the same time their cultural role and potential for tourism development has grown. Lighthouse groups seeking to preserve lighthouses soon found that in Canada, the landmark buildings fell into a heritage Catch-22. As federal buildings, they are exempt from municipal or provincial laws, but they are not protected by any federal heritage laws. Lighthouses are instead merely subject to a property management program called the Federal Heritage Building Review Office (FHBRO). A survey of lighthouses across Canada in 1998 by the Nova Scotia Lighthouse Preservation Society showed that fewer than four per cent of Canadian lighthouses have been protected from demolition under FHBRO, while in the United States, 70 per cent of lighthouses over 50 years old have heritage protection by the National Register of Historic Places. The FHBRO process has also been criticized for lack of public consultation with most communities having no idea when local lighthouses were evaluated and for the fact that when lighthouses are sold privately or transferred to other levels of government, even the minimal FHBRO protection evaporates.

This lack of protection for heritage lighthouses was first felt in Nova Scotia, the Canadian province with the largest number of lighthouses. So many were facing demolition and neglect, that a campaign for federal legislation to protect lighthouses was launched by the Nova Scotia Lighthouse Preservation Society at the Chebucto Head lighthouse near Halifax on March 11, 1999. A committee of the society soon networked with other lighthouse groups in Atlantic Canada, Quebec, Ontario and British Columbia, organizing a letter campaign to the Canadian Heritage Minister and every Member of Parliament and Senator to ask for legislation creating a "Lighthouse Protection Act". Many politicians responded positively but the leadership for the bill emerged from a fitting East Coast/West Coast partnership of two Canadian Senators, Mike Forrestall from Nova Scotia and Pat Carney from British Columbia. Forrestall first introduced the Bill in 2000, noting that lighthouses were neglected national symbols, "The government was hell-bent on tearing them down or abandoning them."

== Content ==
A plaque designating the Long Eddy Point Lighthouse as a heritage lighthouse under the provisions of the act

The bill is modelled on the successful Heritage Railway Stations Protection Act passed by Parliament in 1988 which has proven a success in preserving railway heritage buildings.

=== Designation process ===
Under the Act, the Minister responsible for the Parks Canada Agency sets criteria to designate a heritage lighthouse, based on historical, architectural, and community values. The Minister is guided by specific criteria and the advice of an advisory committee. Before a lighthouse that has been declared surplus by the government can be designated, a group must provide a written commitment to Fisheries and Oceans Canada to acquire it, protect is heritage characteristics and to make use of it in a manner that will be financially viable. Parks Canada published full specifics about the program on its Web site.

=== Protection ===
Renovations at a designated lighthouse must meet heritage building criteria established by the minister based on national and international standards for the conservation of heritage properties. An exception is made for renovations in an emergency circumstance or for urgent operational requirements for the lighthouse's navigational role. The heritage character of the lighthouse must still be protected even if a lighthouse is sold or transferred to another level of government. A heritage lighthouse may not be demolished unless "there is no reasonable alternative". An exception is made for demolitions in an emergency circumstance or for urgent operational requirements. Both the sale and demolition of a designated lighthouse would require public consultation.

== History of the Bill in Parliament ==
The Act was first introduced by the late Senator Mike Forrestall of Nova Scotia as a Private Member's Bill (S-21) in 2000. It was brought it forward three more times, as S-7, then as S-14, then as S-41 which was given Third Reading by the Senate on March 23, 2005. The House of Commons debated the bill in June 2005 in Second Reading and referred it to the Standing Committee on the Environment and Sustainable Development for clause-by-clause review. The bill died on the Order Paper when the federal election of January 2006 was called. Following the death of Senator Forrestall in June 2006, the bill was re-introduced as Bill-S220 in October 2006 by Senator Pat Carney of British Columbia. The Bill was given Third Reading and passed by the Senate on December 14, 2006.

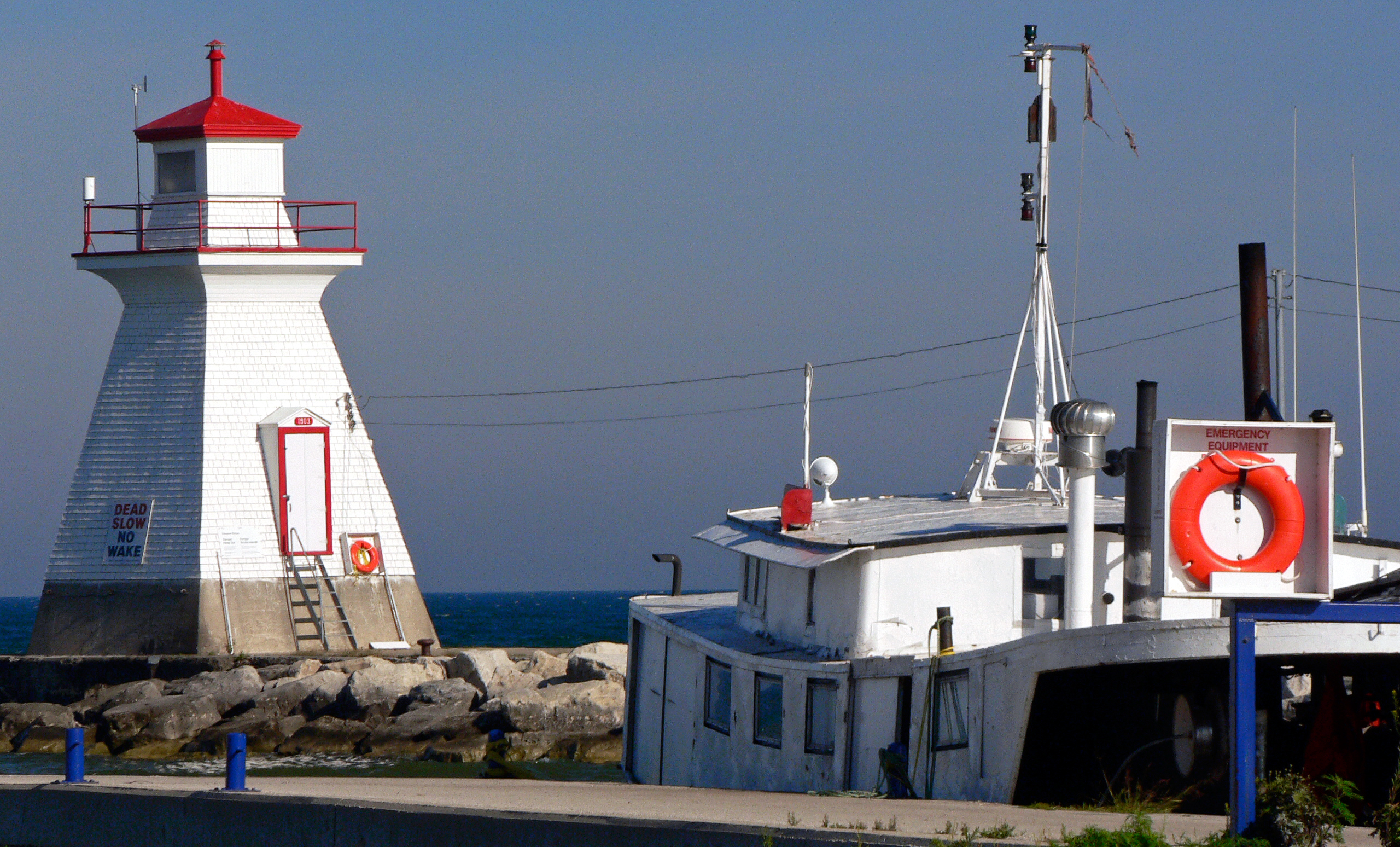
Harbour Range lighthouse, Saugeen Shores, Ontario, one of the first four designated under the Act (2012)

The bill was first sponsored in the House of Commons by Conservative Member of Parliament Gerald Keddy. It passed Second Reading on June 13, 2007, and was scheduled to be reviewed by the House of Commons Fisheries Committee in October 2007 before Third and Final Reading. However, the announcement on September 4 that Parliament would be prorogued in October put the bill back to the Senate where on October 30 Pat Carney re-introduced it as Bill S-215. The Bill passed Third Reading in the Senate on December 13, 2007, and was re-introduced in the House of Commons by Conservative Member of Parliament Larry Miller where it passed 2nd Reading on March 11, 2008. The bill was referred to committee where an amendment were made to define lighthouse structures and limit the act to federally owned lighthouses. The Third and final Commons vote was made on May 1, 2008, followed by a Senate vote to approve the amendment which the bill passed on May 8. Royal Assent was given on May 29, 2008.

The Act came into effect on May 29, 2010, two years after Royal Assent.

=== Debate ===
The bill enjoyed consistent multi-party support from its Conservative sponsors but also Liberals such as Newfoundland MP Scott Simms and New Democratic Party MP Peter Stoffer who withdrew his own private member's bill to protect lighthouses in support of S-220. Other MPs such as Catherine Bell from British Columbia welcomed an initiative to preserving a national landmark as a healthy alternative to contentious partisan issues of a minority Parliament. The only formal opposition was voiced by a Bloc Quebecois MP Raynald Blais who said he could not support the bill because it might mask federal neglect of other DFO responsibilities. In addition to regional lighthouse advocates such as the Nova Scotia Lighthouse Preservation Society, the Heritage Canada Foundation was a consistent supporter noting that lighthouses need special protection because of the lack of federal legislation for any federal buildings.

Despite the broad public support for the bill, some federal departmental staff initially opposed the bill suggesting it could cost up to $384 million to upgrade all of Canada's lighthouses to heritage standards. Supporters of the bill called these numbers inflated, pointing out that it assumes that every piece of navigational equipment in the country, including hundreds of steel towers and floating buoys, would be designated whereas even the strongest proponents only anticipate the nomination of a select number of landmark lighthouses. They also noted that the bill leaves control of the number of designations, and any associated, costs, with the minister.

== Implementation and controversy ==
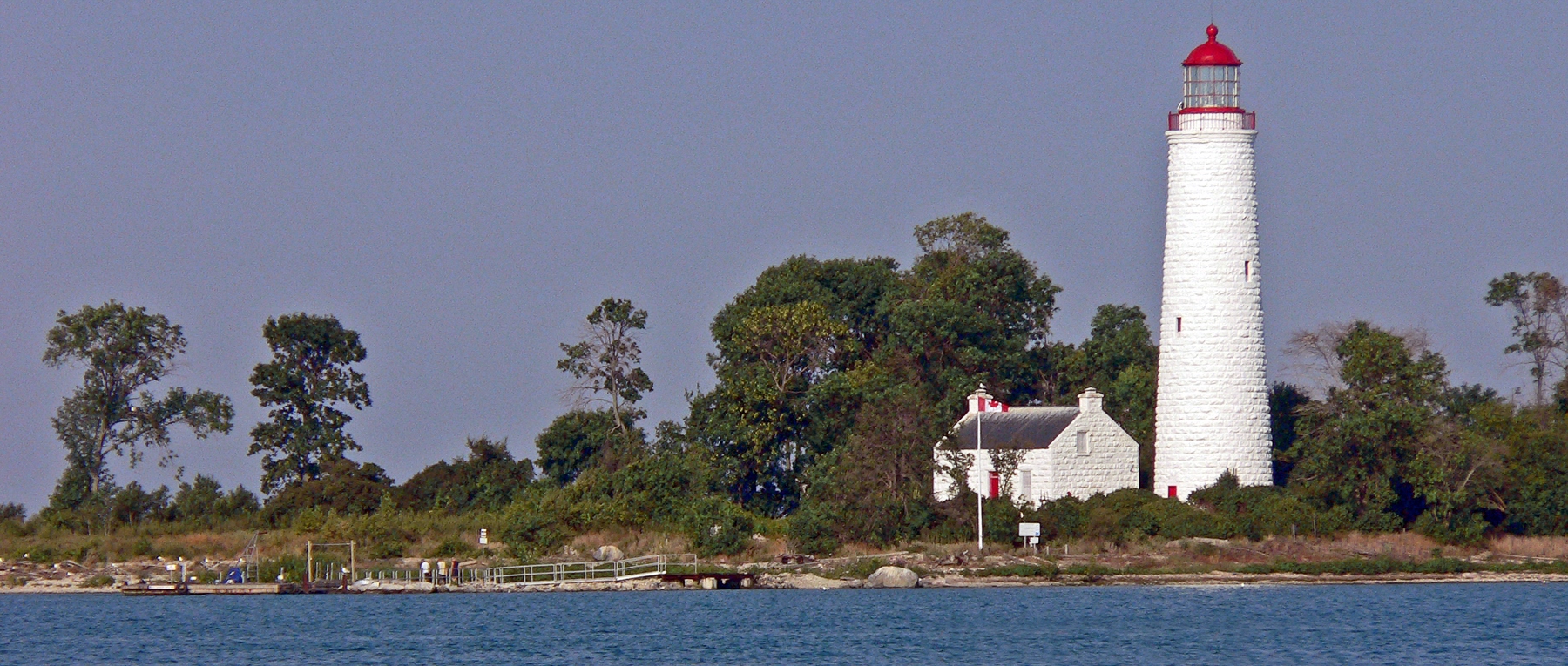
Chantry Island Lighthouse, Ontario, one of the first lights to be nominated under the Act is not yet designated

Parks Canada assigned staff and set up a program for heritage lighthouses following the passage of the act. Beginning in May 2010 communities became eligible to nominate lighthouses for designation. Communities had two years to nominate lighthouses as nominations closed on June 29, 2012. By the fall of 2010, 22 lighthouses had been nominated, mostly in Ontario including Chantry Island Lightstation Tower, one of the first to be nominated. It has yet to be designated because ownership cannot be transferred from the federal government to the Town of Saugeen Shores due to the uncertainty created by First Nations land claims to islands in the Lake Huron basin.

The move in June 2010 to dispose of almost all lighthouses in Canada, even operational lighthouses, caused controversy. Critics noted that as non-federal lighthouse are not covered by the Act, the move to disposal proposal essentially "emasculates" the Act. Other groups have pointed out that the Act is being used as a disposal mechanism for lighthouses contrary to its original intent. Critics included the Senate Committee on Fisheries and Oceans. In late 2010, Committee chair Bill Rompkey of Newfoundland and Labrador said the sell-off defeats the purpose of the act and called for the nomination process to be extended. As of May 2015, 970 had been declared surplus; 348 of those were the subject of public petitions for preservation under the Act. The announcement required that any group that nominates a lighthouses must buy or take ownership of it. In other words, according to the Chronicle Herald, the Heritage Lighthouse Protection Act "seeks to divest the structures to new owners".

Of the 90 lighthouses that had been designated under the Act as of September 2016, 42 were still being managed by the federal government and 48 were being managed by other owners, such as community groups.

== Heritage designation status ==
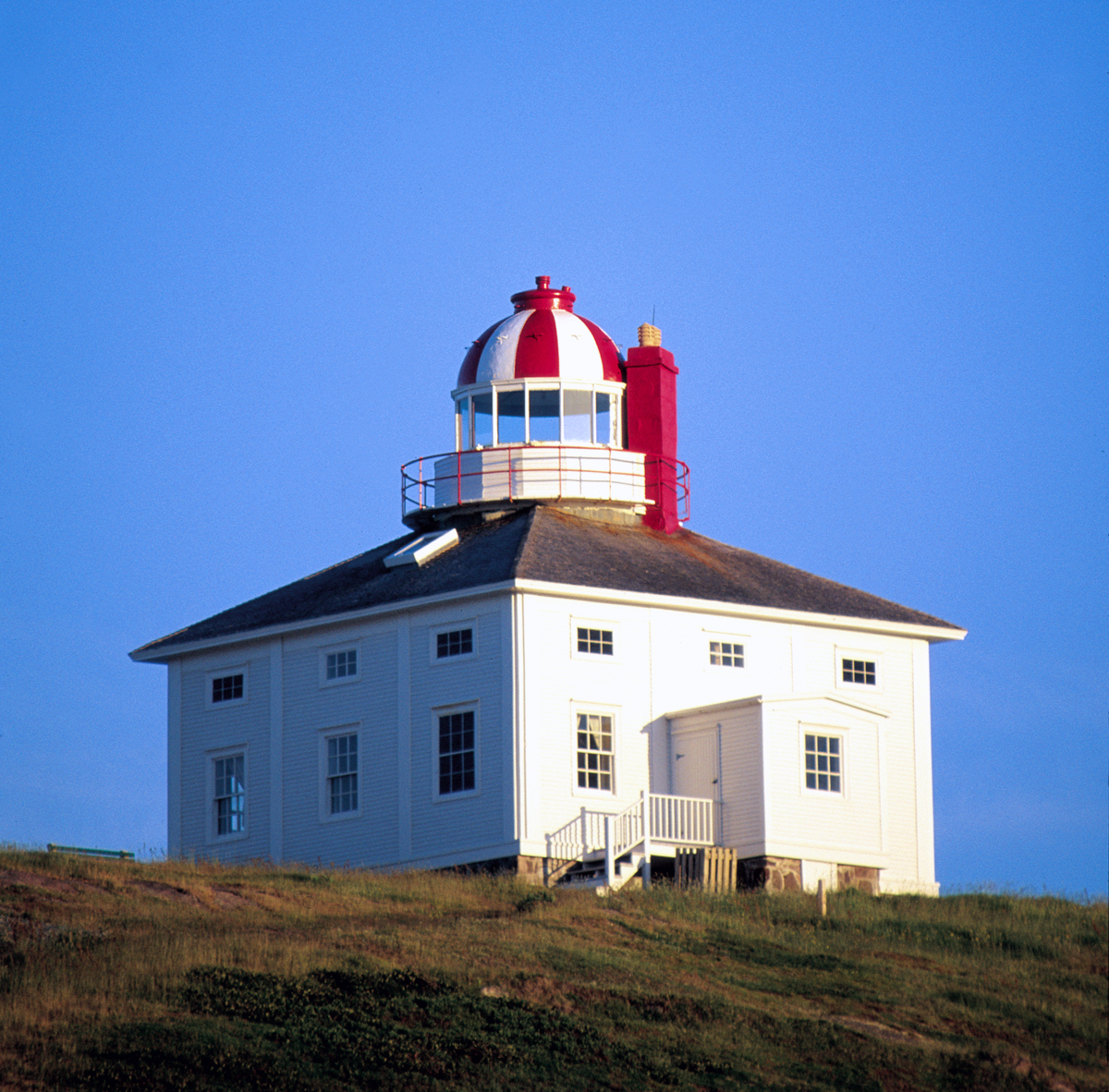
Cape Spear Lighthouse, St. John's, Newfoundland and Labrador, designated 30 June 2016

The designation process has continued well beyond 2015. For example, a full 13 were protected in July 2016 under the Heritage Lighthouse Protection Act. Subsequently, Marc Seguin of the non-profit group Save Our Lighthouses told Radio Canada that there were over 500 others that could be designated. An additional two were protected in February 2017 for a total of 92, in eight provinces, as of that date. A full list of lighthouses protected to date is published (and updated as required) on the Parks Canada web site.

== See also ==
- Lighthouses in Canada
- List of lighthouses in Ontario
- Canadian architecture
- Canadian culture
