= Long Point Region Conservation Authority =

Conservation authority in Ontario, Canada

The Long Point Region Conservation Authority is a conservation authority which oversees the watersheds in the Long Point Region of Ontario, Canada. The Long Point Region watershed encompasses over 30 creeks and tributaries that flow into Lake Erie, near Long Point.

Watercourses that flow through the region include Big Otter Creek, Big Creek, Lynn River and Nanticoke Creek.

The region includes remnants of the Carolinian forest that once covered much of southern Ontario.

== Conservation areas ==
- Backus Heritage Conservation Area
- Deer Creek Conservation Area
- Haldimand Conservation Area
- Norfolk Conservation Area
- Waterford North Conservation Area
