= Venison Creek =

Venison Creek may refer to:

- Venison Creek (Ontario), a tributary to Big Creek, which flows into Lake Erie
- Venison Creek (Michigan), in Gladwin County, 43.87586°N 84.44167°W
- Venison Creek (Wisconsin), in Sawyer County, 45.96496°N 91.0799°W
