= Gibraltar Point Lighthouse =

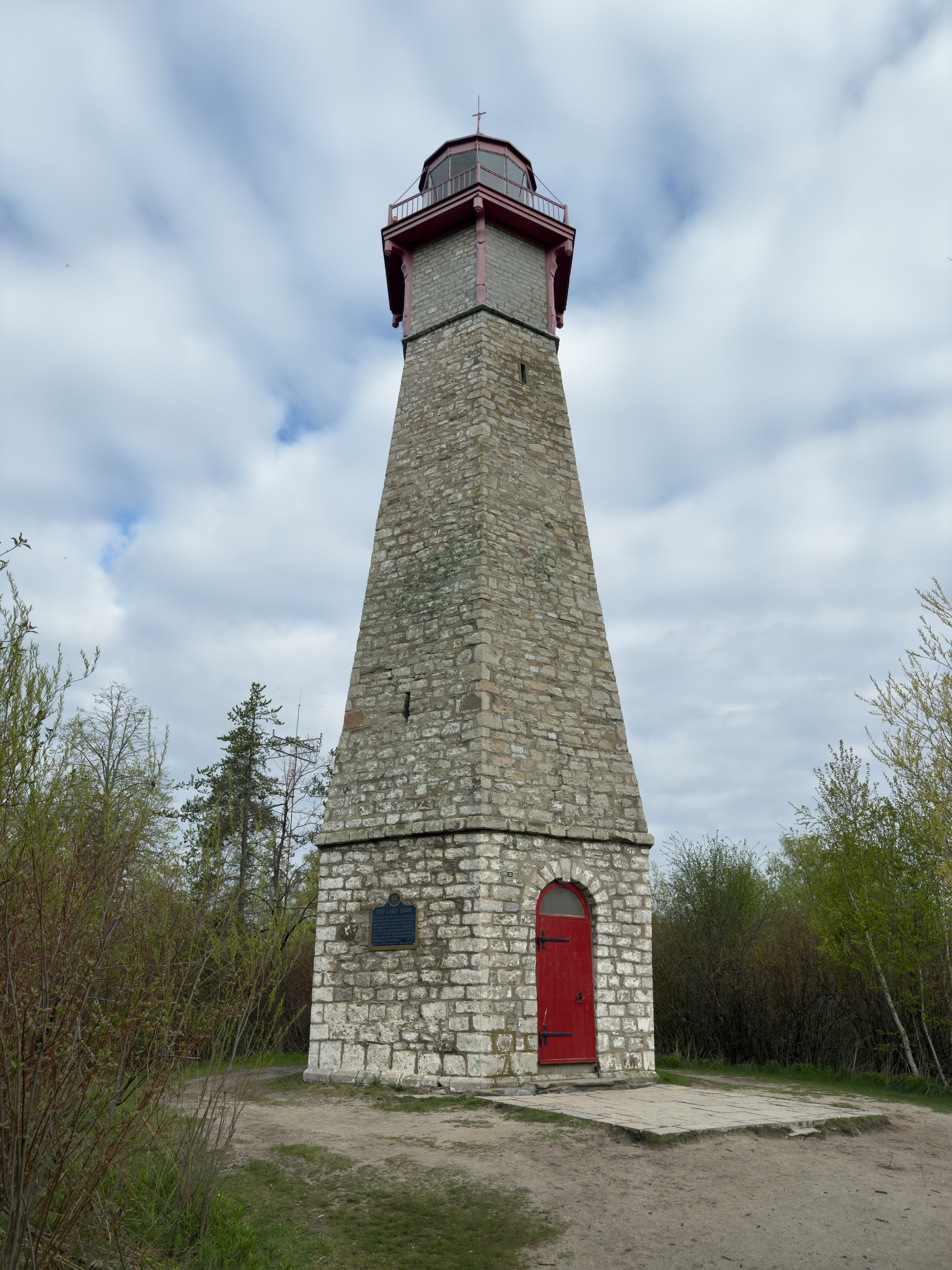
- Location: Toronto Islands
- Coordinates: 43°36′49.2″N 79°23′07″W

Tower
- Constructed: 1808
- Construction: stone tower
- Height: 25 metres (82 ft)
- Shape: hexagonal tower with balcony and lantern
- Markings: unpainted gray stone tower, red lantern
- Operator: City of Toronto

Light
- First lit: 1809
- Deactivated: 1956

The Gibraltar Point Lighthouse is a lighthouse located on Hanlan's Point, the most westerly of the Toronto Islands in Toronto, Ontario, Canada. Begun in 1808, it is the oldest existing lighthouse on the Great Lakes, and one of Toronto's oldest buildings. The lighthouse is perhaps best known for the demise of its first keeper, German-born John Paul Radelmüller, whose 1815 murder forms the basis of Toronto's most enduring ghost story. Recent research has verified many aspects of the traditional tale of his death and identified the soldiers charged with but ultimately acquitted of the crime.

== History ==
Authorized in 1803 with two other lighthouses by an Act of the Legislative Assembly of Upper Canada, construction of the Gibraltar Point lighthouse did not begin until 1808. It was built to a height of 52 feet (16 m) and extended to 82 feet (25 m) in 1832. The diameter ranges from about 7 metres (23 ft) at the base to about 2.1 metres (6.9 ft) at the top. The base is made from stone quarried in Queenston and the extension from Kingston stone. The lighthouse construction and maintenance was paid for through a harbour fee levied upon all boats entering the harbour. When completed in August 1809, the lighthouse was located 25 feet (7.6 m) from the shore. Since then, sand has built up over time so that it now stands about 100 metres (110 yd) inland.

When opened, the lighthouse was accompanied by the lighthouse keeper's cottage. It was a squared-log house clad in clapboard. It was two-stories, having two rooms on the first floor and sleeping space in the attic above. When ships approached, the lighthouse keeper would run up a flag to notify the Toronto harbour master. The cottage no longer exists, demolished in 1950.

The tower light was initially an oak and glass cage, illuminated by candles. The tower switched to sperm oil from 1832 and switched to coal in 1863. The original lamp structure was wood and replaced with steel in 1878. An electric light was installed in 1916–17 and updated in 1945. In 1958, Metro Parks took over operations and made renovations in 1961–62. Currently unused, the lighthouse is occasionally open for public tours, including on the annual Doors Open Toronto weekend.

Since the decommissioning of the lighthouse, smaller automated lighthouses (two located at Humber Bay Park in the west and Bluffer's Park to the east), Toronto Harbour Light, as well as floating bell or light buoys, navigational masts have been used to replace the lighthouse to provide navigational aid along Toronto's waterfront and Toronto Harbour.

== John Paul Radelmüller ==
A local legend is that the lighthouse is haunted by its first keeper John Paul Radelmüller (often rendered incorrectly as Rademiller, Radenmuller, Radan Muller etc.), who was murdered in 1815.

According to local lore, soldiers from Fort York visited Radelmüller on the evening of January 2, 1815, in search of his bootlegged beer. But they had too much to drink and a dispute broke out, culminating in the keeper's murder. The dispute may have been about the keeper's bootleg being watered down.The inebriated soldiers, so it is claimed, tried to conceal their crime by chopping apart the corpse and hiding the remains. In 1893, then-keeper George Durnan searched for the corpse and found part of a jawbone and coffin fragments near the lighthouse, though it was impossible to definitively prove they were linked to Radelmüller. The veracity of the legend of the murder has long been questioned. As prominent Toronto historian Mike Filey wrote, when it came to the truth of the story of the keeper's demise, "Your guess is as good as mine."

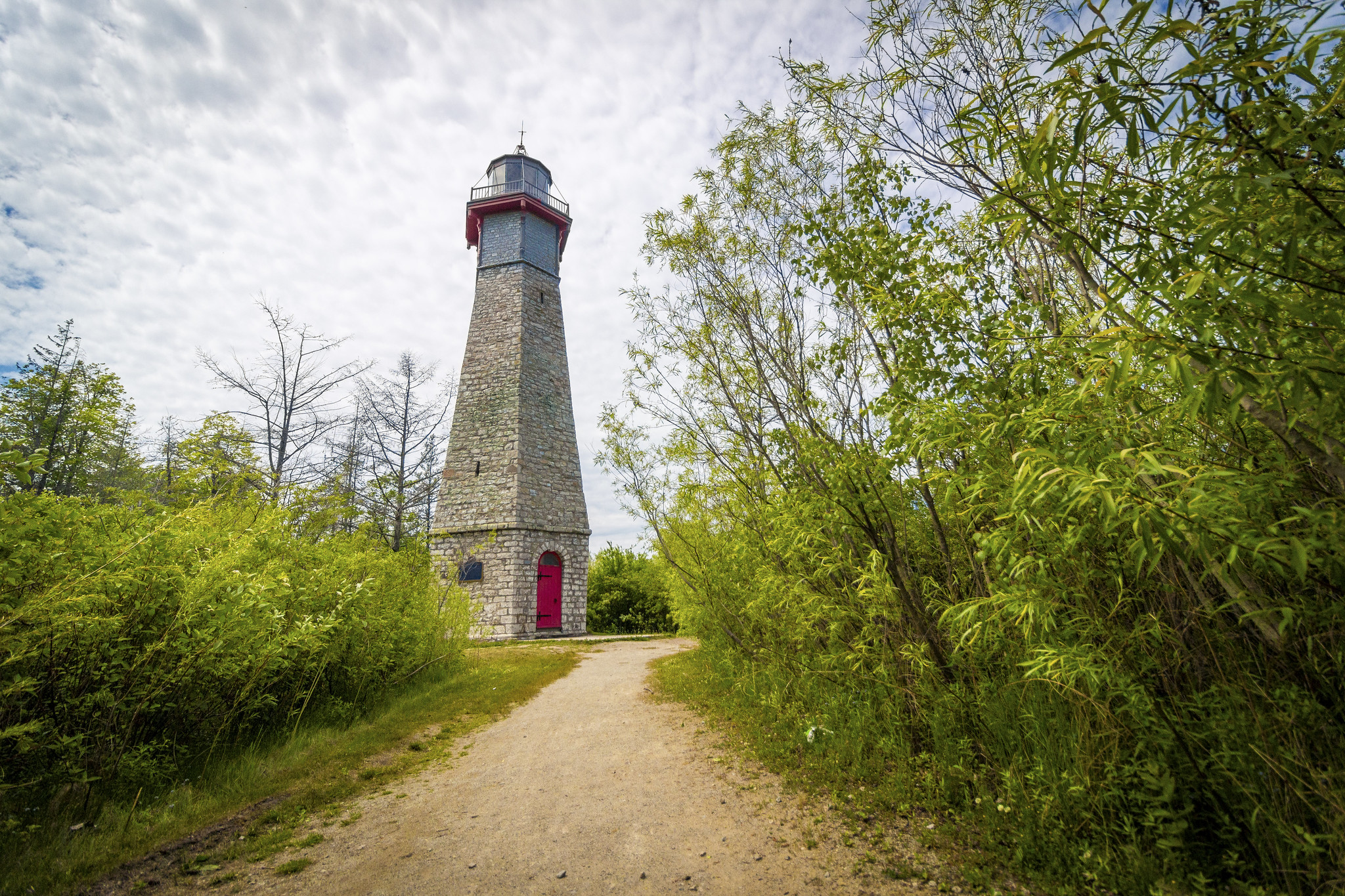
Gibraltar Point Lighthouse on the Toronto Islands

Recent scholarship has revealed more about Radelmüller's life and death. Born circa 1763 in Anspach, Germany, Radelmüller worked as a servant of royalty for twenty years, in the households of the Duke of Gloucester and the Duke of Kent, accompanying the latter to Halifax, Nova Scotia in 1799. Arriving at York in 1804, Radelmüller was appointed as keeper of the Gibraltar Point Lighthouse on July 24, 1809.

Radelmüller indeed suffered a violent death on January 2, 1815, aged approximately fifty-two, according to the most recent and definitive study of his murder, which confirmed the basic truth of many aspects of the popular legend. Eamonn O'Keeffe also identified the two soldiers charged with (but acquitted of) Radelmüller's murder as John Henry and John Blueman, both Irishmen of the Glengarry Light Infantry, a regiment that saw heavy action in the War of 1812.

While research has verified much of the traditional tale, O'Keeffe cast doubt on some of the more dramatic elements of the story. Contrary to claims that the keeper's corpse was hacked to pieces and hidden, contemporary evidence suggests that Radelmüller's body was not mutilated, but was found after his death by the lighthouse's fourth keeper George Durnan and his Uncle Joe while he was a young man, and his father was the keeper. He related to John Robertson that he and his uncle had discovered bone fragments, most notably a jawbone, and fragments of a coffin 500 ft (150 m) west of the lighthouse, he believed they belonged to the late Radelmüller.

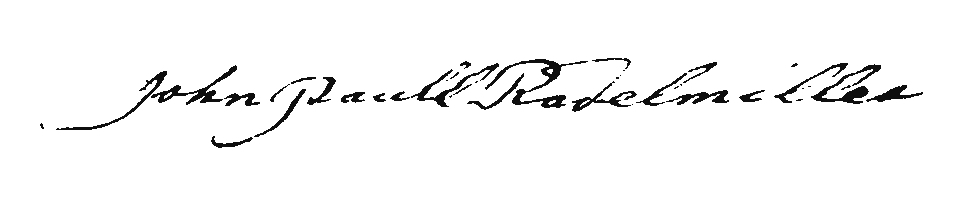
Signature of John Paul Radelmüller (Written here as Radelmiller)

== Lighthouse keepers ==
- John Paul Radelmüller 1809–1815
- William Halloway 1816–1831
- James Durnan 1832–1854
- George Durnan 1854–1908
- Captain Patrick J. McSherry 1905–1912
- Blake Matthews 1912–1917
- G.F. Eaton 1917–1918
- F.C. Allan 1918–1944
- Mrs. Ladder 1944–1955
- Mrs. Dedie Dodds 1955–1958
- Mr. Terry Jesty 1958–1998
- Mr. Manuel Cappel 1999 – today

== See also ==
- List of lighthouses in Canada
- List of lighthouses in Ontario
- List of oldest buildings and structures in Toronto
- Queen's Wharf Lighthouse
