= Duma (disambiguation) =

A duma is a Russian assembly.

Duma may also refer to:

== Arts ==
- Duma (2005 film), an American-South African adventure film
- Duma (2011 film), an Israeli documentary
- Duma (band), a Kenyan-Ugandan industrial grindcore band
- Duma (DC Comics), a character in The Sandman comic book series
- Duma (epic), epic poetry of Ukraine
- Dumka (musical genre), an instrumental musical genre inspired by the Duma epic

== People ==
- Duma people (or Adouma), an ethnic group of Gabon
- Christian Duma (born 1982), German athlete
- Ndleleni Duma (1958–2018), South African politician
- Ntando Duma (born 1995), South African actress and television personality
- Siboniso Duma, South African politician
- Sibusiso Duma (born 1984), South African serial killer
- Duma Boko, Botswana politician and lawyer
- Duma Kumalo (died 2006), South African human rights activist and one of the Sharpeville Six
- Duma Mdutyana (1960–2016), South African Army officer and Chief of Joint Operations
- Duma Ndlovu (born 1954), South African poet, filmmaker, producer, journalist and playwright
- Duma Nkosi (1957–2021), South African politician
- Duma Nokwe (1927–1978), South African anti-apartheid activist and legislator
- Duma Riris Silalahi (born 1983), Indonesian actress, singer, fashion model, and beauty pageant titleholder

== Places ==
- Duma, Hama, a village in the Hama district, Syria
- Duma, Nablus, a Palestinian town in the West Bank
- Duma, Syria, a city in Syria
- Duma, a village in Dereneu Commune, Călăraşi district, Moldova
- Duma al-Jandal, ancient city in Saudi Arabia
- "Duma," short for Dumaguete, a city in the Philippines

== Politics ==
- City Duma, a city-level Russian representative assembly
- State Duma, the lower house of parliament of the Russian Federation
- State Duma (Russian Empire), the legislative assembly in the Russian Empire

== Other ==
- Duma (plant), a genus of plants in the family Polygonaceae
- Duma language, a Bantu language spoken in Gabon

== See also ==
- Douma (disambiguation)
- Dumah (disambiguation)
- Dumas (disambiguation)
