= St. Thomas Moraine =

The St. Thomas Moraine is an east-west glacial moraine considered one of the Horseshoe Moraines. It formed at the time of Lake Maumee II filled part of the basin of what is now Lake Erie. Other portions of the basin were filled by a lobe of the Laurentian icesheet, known as the Erie Lobe. The moraine is approximately 30 kilometres (19 mi) long, and 5 kilometres (3.1 mi) wide, running parallel to the shore of Lake Erie, about 15 kilometres (9.3 mi) inshore.
