= List of lighthouses in Ontario =

This is a list of lighthouses in the province of Ontario, Canada.

== Lighthouses ==
Name	Image	Water body	Region	Location	Built	Notes
Battle Island Light		Lake Superior	Northwestern Ontario	Battle Island 48°45′06.5″N 87°33′26.4″W	1911	
Big Tub Lighthouse		Lake Huron	Southwestern Ontario	Tobermory 45°15′27″N 81°40′22″W	1885	
Bois Blanc Island Lighthouse		Detroit River	Southwestern Ontario	Bois Blanc Island 42°05′13″N 83°7′10″W	1836	
Burlington Canal Main Lighthouse		Lake Ontario	Southwestern Ontario	Hamilton Harbour 43.29848°N 79.79522°W	1858	
Caribou Island Light		Lake Superior	Northwestern Ontario	Caribou Island 47°20′23.1″N 85°49′33.1″W	1912	
Chantry Island Lighthouse		Lake Huron	Southwestern Ontario	Chantry Island 44.48938°N 81.40194°W	1859	
Christian Island Lighthouse		Lake Huron	Central Ontario	Christian Island 44.786639°N 80.156056°W	1859	
Colchester Reef Light (Lake Erie, West)		Lake Erie	Southwestern Ontario	Colchester Reef 41°55′55.9″N 82°53′27.6″W	1885	
Cove Island Lighthouse		Lake Huron	Southwestern Ontario	Cove Island 45.327080°N 81.735411°W	1855	
Gereaux Island Lightstation		Georgian Bay	Central Ontario	Parry Sound 45.744497°N 80.659015°W	1870	
Gibraltar Point Lighthouse		Lake Ontario	Golden Horseshoe	Toronto Islands 43.613667°N 79.385278°W	1808	
Goderich Lighthouse		Lake Huron	Southwestern Ontario	Goderich 43.742179°N 81.724564°W	1850	
Grand Bend Lighthouse		Lake Huron	Southwestern Ontario	Lambton Shores 43.313820°N 81.768029°W		
Griffith Island Lighthouse		Georgian Bay	Southwestern Ontario	Griffith Island 44.850568°N 80.891397°W	1859	
Gros Cap Reefs Light		Lake Superior	Northeastern Ontario	Sault Ste. Marie 46.51213°N 84.61524°W	1953	
Mimico Cruising Club Lighthouses		Lake Ontario	Golden Horseshoe	Toronto 43.618126°N 79.481455°W	1981	
Ile Parisienne Light		Lake Superior	Northeastern Ontario	Ile Parisienne 46.645278°N 84.724°W	1911	
Killarney East Lighthouse		Georgian Bay	Northeastern Ontario	Greater Sudbury 45.96819°N 81.48892°W	1866	
Kincardine Lighthouse		Lake Huron	Southwestern Ontario	Kincardine 44.17708°N 81.63809°W	1881	
Lion's Head Light		Georgian Bay	Southeastern Ontario	Lion's Head 44.99058°N 81.24808°W	1903 (original) 1983 (current)	
Mississagi Strait Lighthouse		Lake Huron (Mississagi Strait)	Northeastern Ontario	Manitoulin Island 45.891539°N 83.225695°W	1873	
Mohawk Island Lighthouse		Lake Erie	Golden Horseshoe	Dunnville 42.834055°N 79.522820°W	1848	
Nottawasaga Lighthouse		Georgian Bay	Southwestern Ontario	Collingwood 44.53857°N 80.25869°W	1858	
Point Abino Light Tower		Lake Erie	Golden Horseshoe	Crystal Beach 42.8361°N 79.0952°W	1917	
Point Clark Lighthouse		Lake Huron	Southwestern Ontario	Point Clark 44.072854°N 81.757217°W	1859	
Pointe au Baril Lighthouse		Georgian Bay	Central Ontario	Pointe au Baril 45.559136°N 80.503532°W	1889	
Port Burwell Marine Museum and Historic Lighthouse		Lake Erie	Southwestern Ontario	Port Burwell 42.644722°N 80.805833°W	1840	
Port Dalhousie Lighthouse		Lake Ontario	Golden Horseshoe	St. Catharines 43.2078°N 79.2633°W	1833	
Port Dover Lighthouse		Lake Erie	Golden Horseshoe	Port Dover 42.78111°N 80.20183°W	1845	
Presqu'île Point Lighthouse		Lake Ontario	Eastern Ontario	Presqu'ile Provincial Park 43.997867°N 77.675647°W	1840	
Queen's Wharf Lighthouse		Lake Ontario	Golden Horseshoe	Toronto 43.635889°N 79.404972°W	1838	
Strawberry Island Lighthouse		Lake Huron	Northeastern Ontario	Strawberry Island 45.973440°N 81.854124°W	1881	
Thames River Light		Lake St. Clair	Southwestern Ontario	Lakeshore, Ontario 42.317514°N 82.453297°W	1818	
Toronto Harbour Light		Lake Ontario	Golden Horseshoe	Toronto 43.613545°N 79.34339°W	1974	
Windmill Point Light		Saint Lawrence River	Eastern Ontario	Prescott 44.72091°N 75.48714°W	1830	

== See also ==
- List of lighthouses in Canada
- Imperial Towers (a group of lighthouses in the list)
