= Douma =

Douma may refer to:

== Places ==
- Douma, Burkina Faso
- Douma, Lebanon
- Duma, Nablus, also spelled Douma, a Palestinian town
- Douma District, Syria
- Douma, Syria, the capital of Douma District

== People ==
- Barthold Douma van Burmania (1695–1766), Dutch statesman and ambassador
- Carmen Douma-Hussar (born 1977), Canadian middle-distance runner
- Cees Douma (born 1933), Dutch architect, see Leerdam railway station
- Danny Douma (born 1950s), American singer-songwriter and guitarist
- Felix Douma (1941–2008), Dutch-born Canadian scholar, writer, teacher, cellist, and translator
- Jeffrey Douma, American choral conductor
- Sytse Douma (born 1942), Dutch organizational theorist
- Yacine Douma (born 1973), French judoka
- Ennik Douma (born 2001), birth name of Canadian-Korean singer Jeon So-mi

== Other ==
- A synonym for the plant genus Hyphaene
- An alternative spelling of Duma, a Russian assembly with advisory or legislative functions
- Douma chemical attack

== See also ==
- Christos G. Doumas (born 1933), Greek archaeology professor
- Duma (disambiguation)
