= Gros Cap Reefs Light =

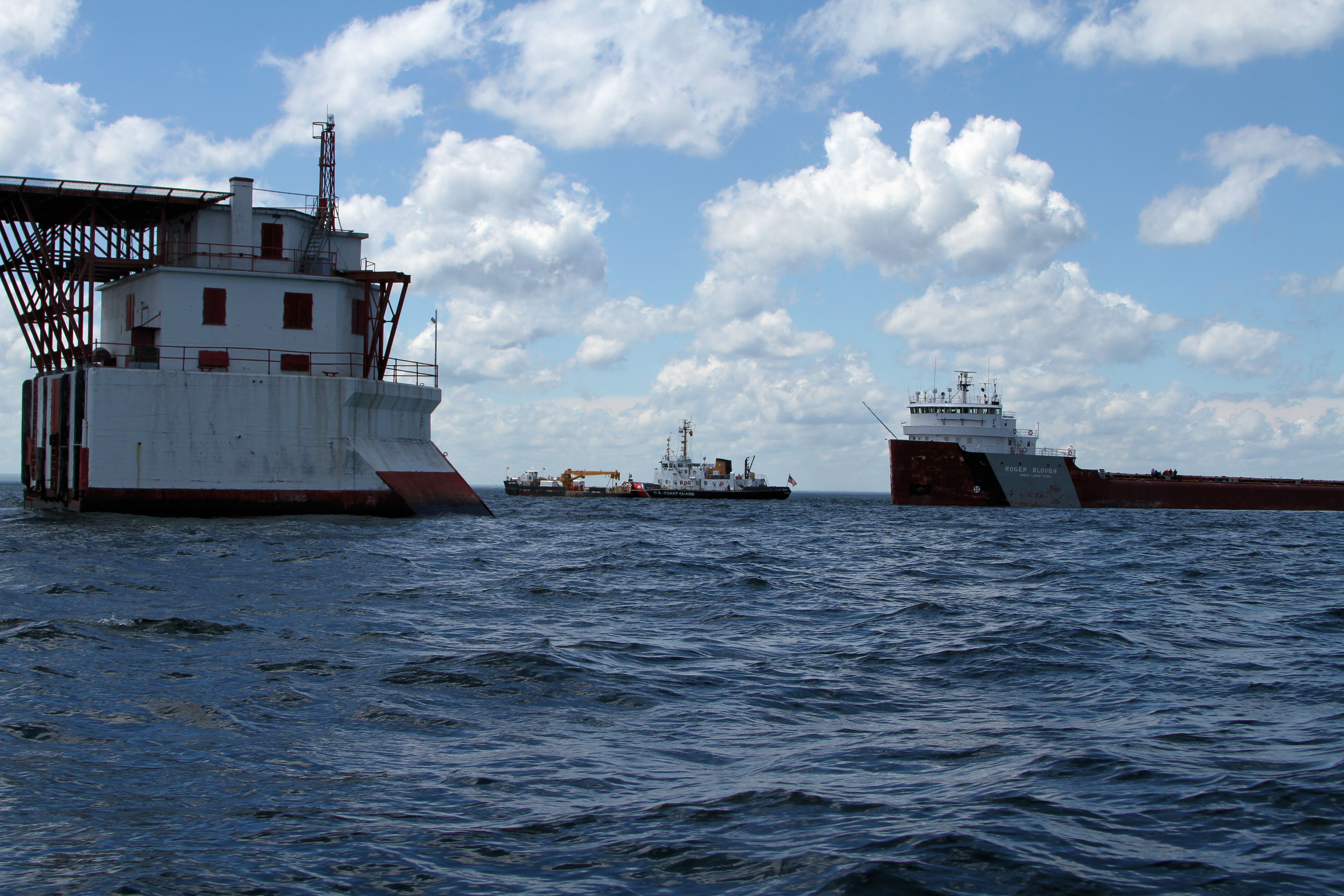
- Location: Sault Ste. Marie; Ontario; Canada
- Coordinates: 46°30′42″N 84°36′53″W

Tower
- Construction: skeletal tower
- Height: 18 metres (59 ft)
- Shape: skeletal mast on a three-story keeper's quarters
- Markings: white tower with red trim
- Operator: Canadian Coast Guard

Light
- First lit: 1953
- Focal height: 18 metres (59 ft)
- Range: 12 nautical miles (22 km; 14 mi)
- Characteristic: Fl R 5s.

The Gros Cap Reefs Light is a lighthouse located at the entrance to St. Mary's River from Whitefish Bay of Lake Superior. The light was completed in 1953 and replaced a lightship stationed there since 1923. The lighthouse, owned by the Canadian Coast Guard, is located on the southwest edge of the Gros Cap Reef.

Light characteristic is a flashing red light, every 5 seconds, visible for 12 miles. Its tower has been removed, the structure is merely a 3-story base which houses the keeper's quarters, with the light mounted on a skeletal mast. The lighthouse also has a helipad. It formerly housed a non-directional beacon as part of the precision approach at Sault Ste. Marie Airport but has since been decommissioned and the antenna taken down due to high maintenance costs.

The opening of this aid to navigation resulted in the deactivation of the Point Iroquois Light in 1962.

== See also ==
- List of lighthouses in Ontario
- List of lighthouses in Canada
