= Port Burwell, Ontario =

Community in Elgin County, Ontario, Canada

Coordinates: 42°38′48″N 80°48′10″W

Location of Port Burwell in Southern Ontario

Port Burwell is a community on the north shore of Lake Erie, in the Municipality of Bayham in Elgin County, Ontario, Canada. It is situated at the mouth of Big Otter Creek, which stretches more than forty miles north through Bayham to Tillsonburg and Otterville, and the harbour at Port Burwell was of historic importance in the development of landlocked Oxford County.

== History ==
Drawing of Port Burwell harbour by Mahlon Burwell, 1840

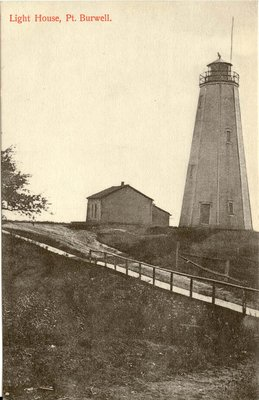
1840 Light House, circa 1910

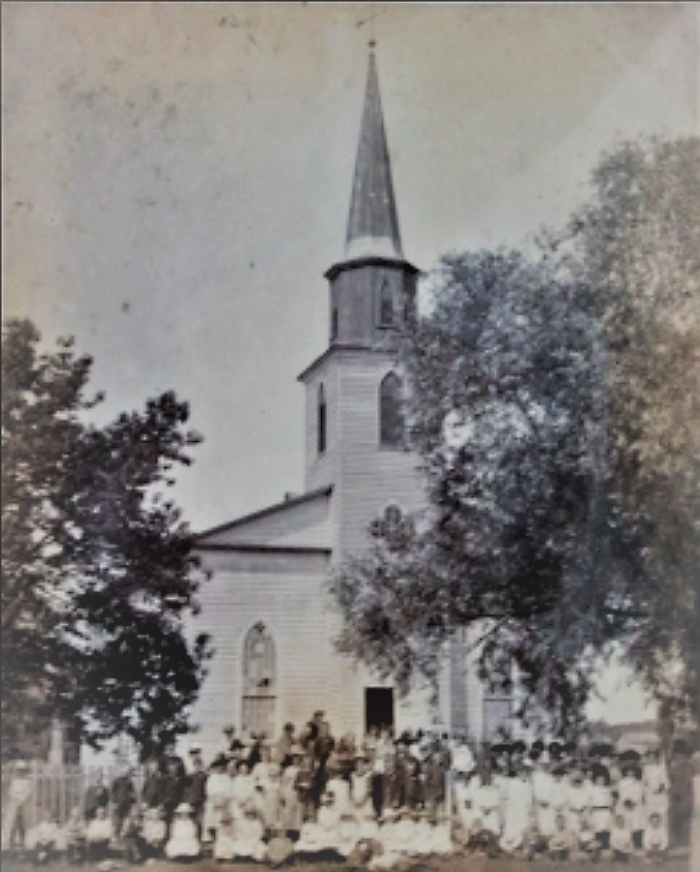
Trinity Church with congregation, Port Burwell, Ontario, circa 1890

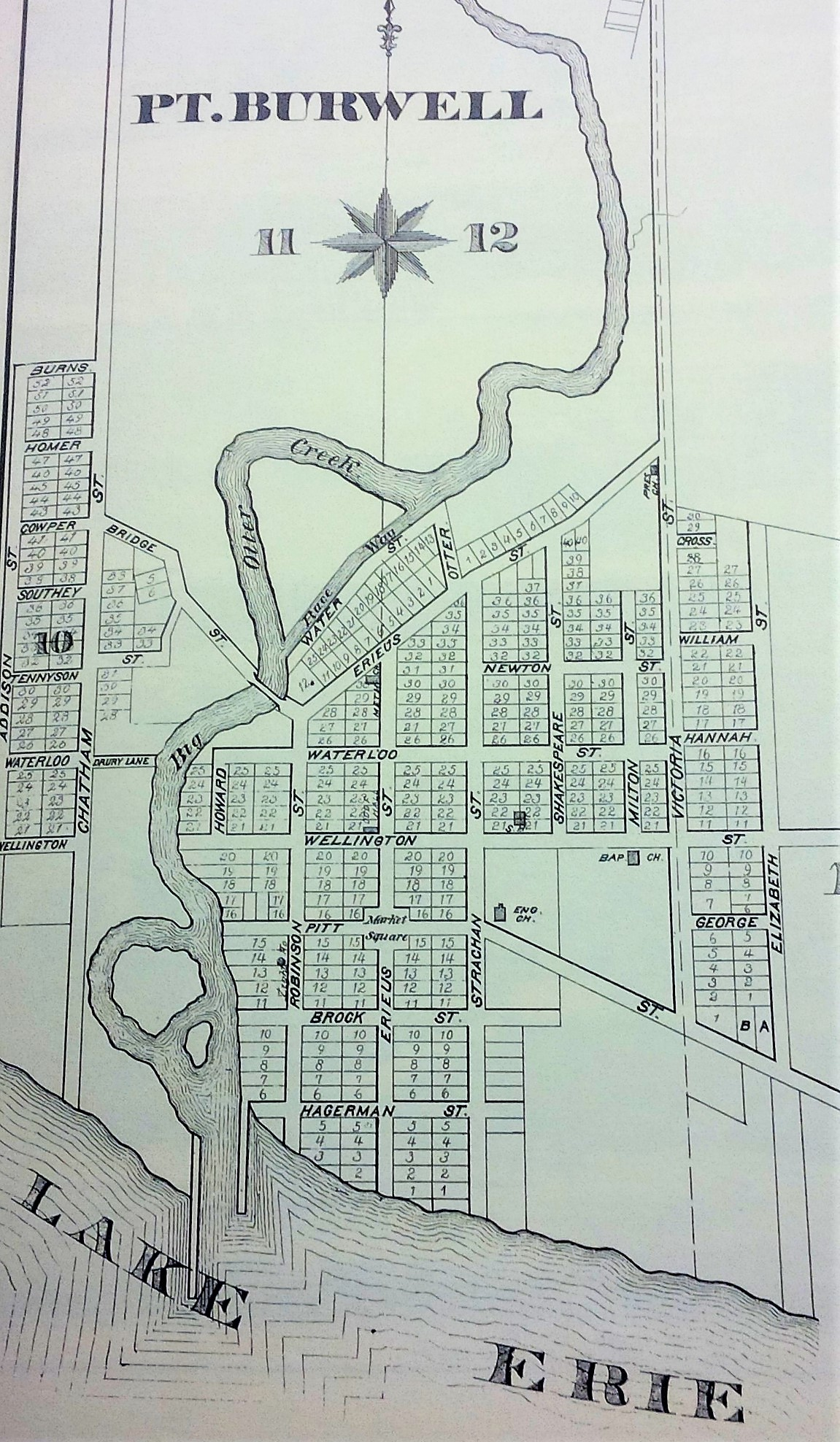
Port Burwell, lots 10, 11 and 12, Concession 1, Bayham Township. 1877 map, showing locations of Market Square, Lighthouse, School House, Odd Fellows' Hall, raceway for sawmills on island in Otter Creek, and English (Anglican), Methodist, Baptist and Presbyterian churches in village

In 1810, besides finishing a government contract for the survey of a large part of what became known as the Talbot Road in response to petitions from land grant recipient Colonel Thomas Talbot, Mahlon Burwell (1783–1846) received instructions to survey the vacant land between Houghton and Yarmouth townships, and to divide it into two townships, under the names of Malahide and Bayham. The work was done and in 1811, Malahide and Bayham were made part of the county of Middlesex. In making this survey, Burwell selected for himself a block of land in Bayham at the mouth of Big Otter Creek, the site of what became Port Burwell.

Writing of that region to the Surveyor General in June 1815, he said "Otter creek discharges more Water than all the small Rivers which disembogue themselves into the North side of lake Erie excepting the Grand River. When a few drifts are cleared out of it, Boats may descend from the Mills in Norwich [at what is now Otterville, in Oxford County] to its mouth, at almost any Season of the year. There are beautiful Groves of White Pine Timber, on each side of the Creek, interspersed with Groves of other Timber, alternately; there is therefore no doubt, but what ere long considerable quantities of Lumber will be conveyed down that stream, from Norwich and other places to the Lake. It would appear as if Nature had intended the mouth of Big-Otter Creek for a place of greater importance than any other in the District of London. In my mind it is highly probable that such will be the case before many years. I am about to lay out what Land I own on the East side of the mouth in a Town Plot." He urged the government to use an adjacent lot held as a reserve for the same purpose, and "if it should meet with the approbation of His Excellency the Provisional Lieutenant Governor, it would much facilitate the future growth of that part of the Province, to have it laid out by the Government, for a Town at the mouth of Big Otter Creek."

Nothing was done by the government, but Burwell and his family kept up interest in the development opportunity at the mouth of Otter Creek and the potential water route north into Oxford County, particularly as Mahlon Burwell served as the elected representative for Oxford and Middlesex from 1812 to 1820. Although he had ownership of the township lots on both sides of the creek mouth – lots 10 and 11 in concession 1 of Bayham township – he needed lot 12 as well to form the village site, and it was a lot reserved by the government under the Clergy Reserve system. Burwell was able to lease the lot in 1818, but it was another twelve years before he could purchase it. He finally opened up a town plot on his land in 1830 that became known as Port Burwell. His brother John petitioned the government in 1848 to improve the harbour, and to add Bayham to Oxford County so it would have a waterfront port, and to build a road north into Oxford from Port Burwell. The government again did not agree, but the Legislative Assembly passed legislation giving special powers to a new harbour company in 1849, and a private company was formed to build the road. Known as the Ingersoll and Port Burwell Plank and Gravel Road, it was completed in 1852 and was the basis for what eventually became Ontario Highway 19, stretching from Port Burwell north through the length of Oxford County to St Marys at the south end of Perth County.

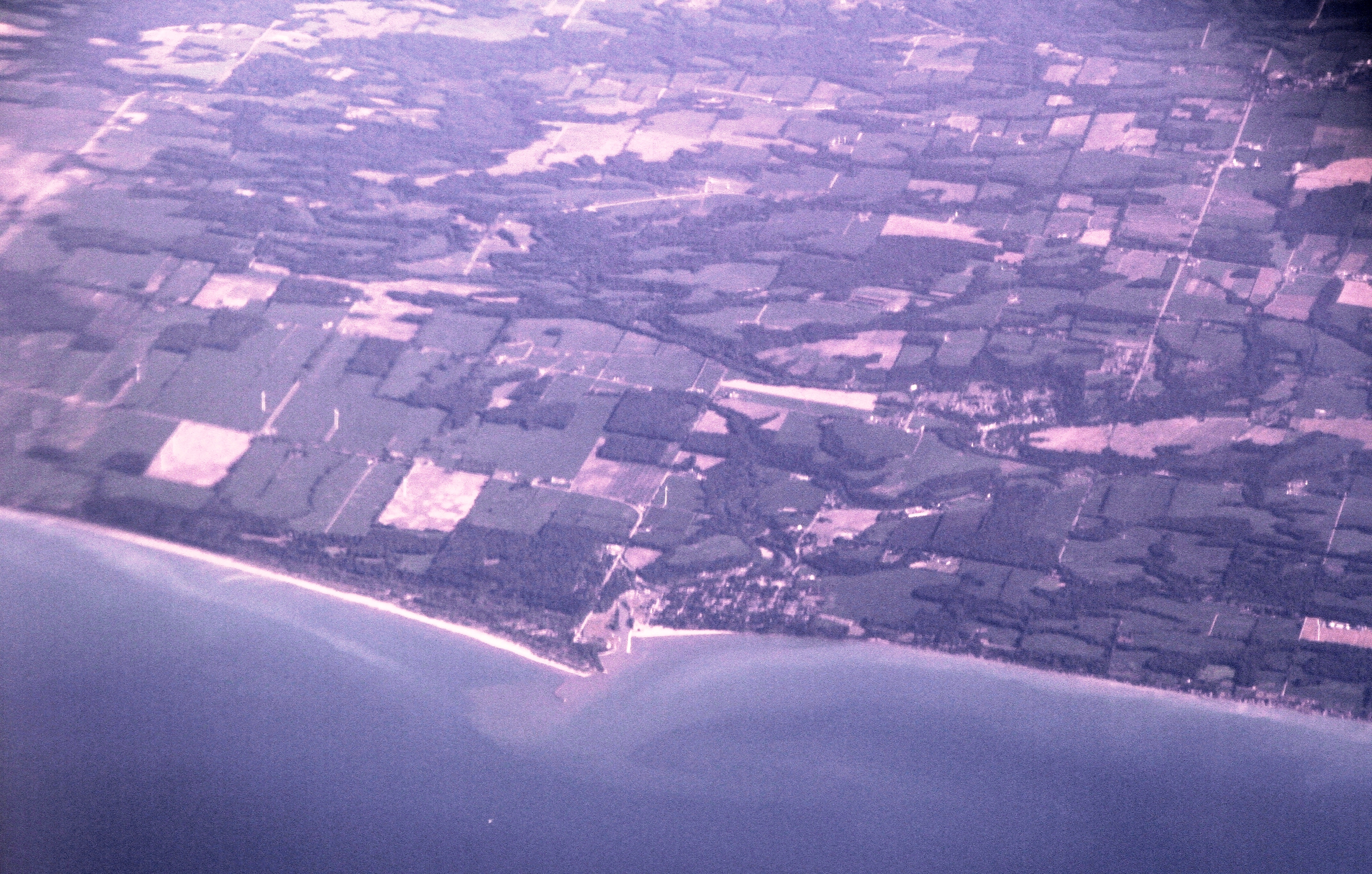
View of lakefront beaches at Port Burwell - the compact 'east beach' in front of the village is free; the miles-long 'west beach' seen to the left requires paid provincial park admission.

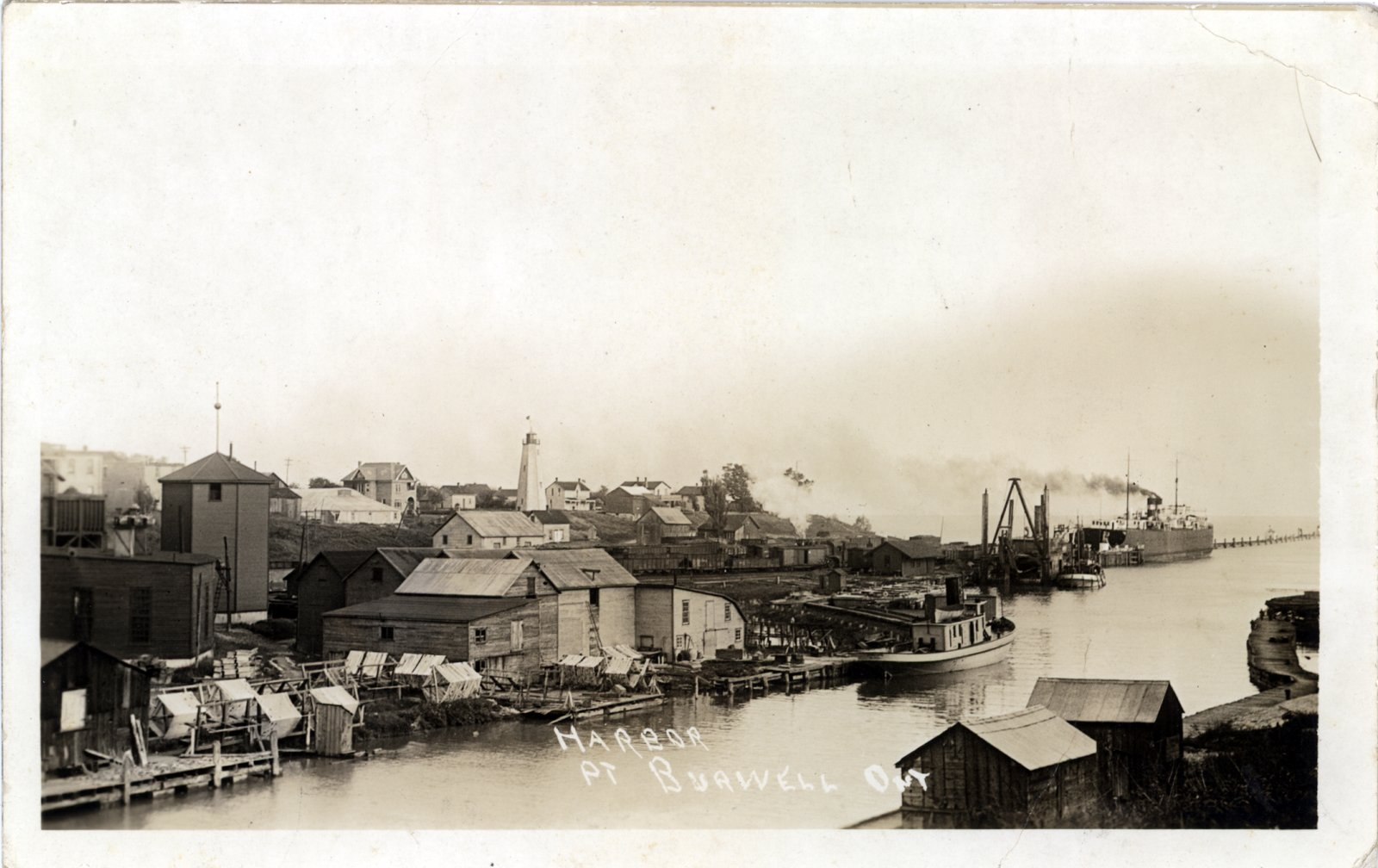
Port Burwell harbour circa 1920. Fishing nets drying on racks around fish packing sheds lining pier; railway yard behind them; steamer Ashtabula at end of pier delivering rail cars loaded with coal from Pennsylvania; 1840 lighthouse and village on tableland overlooking scene

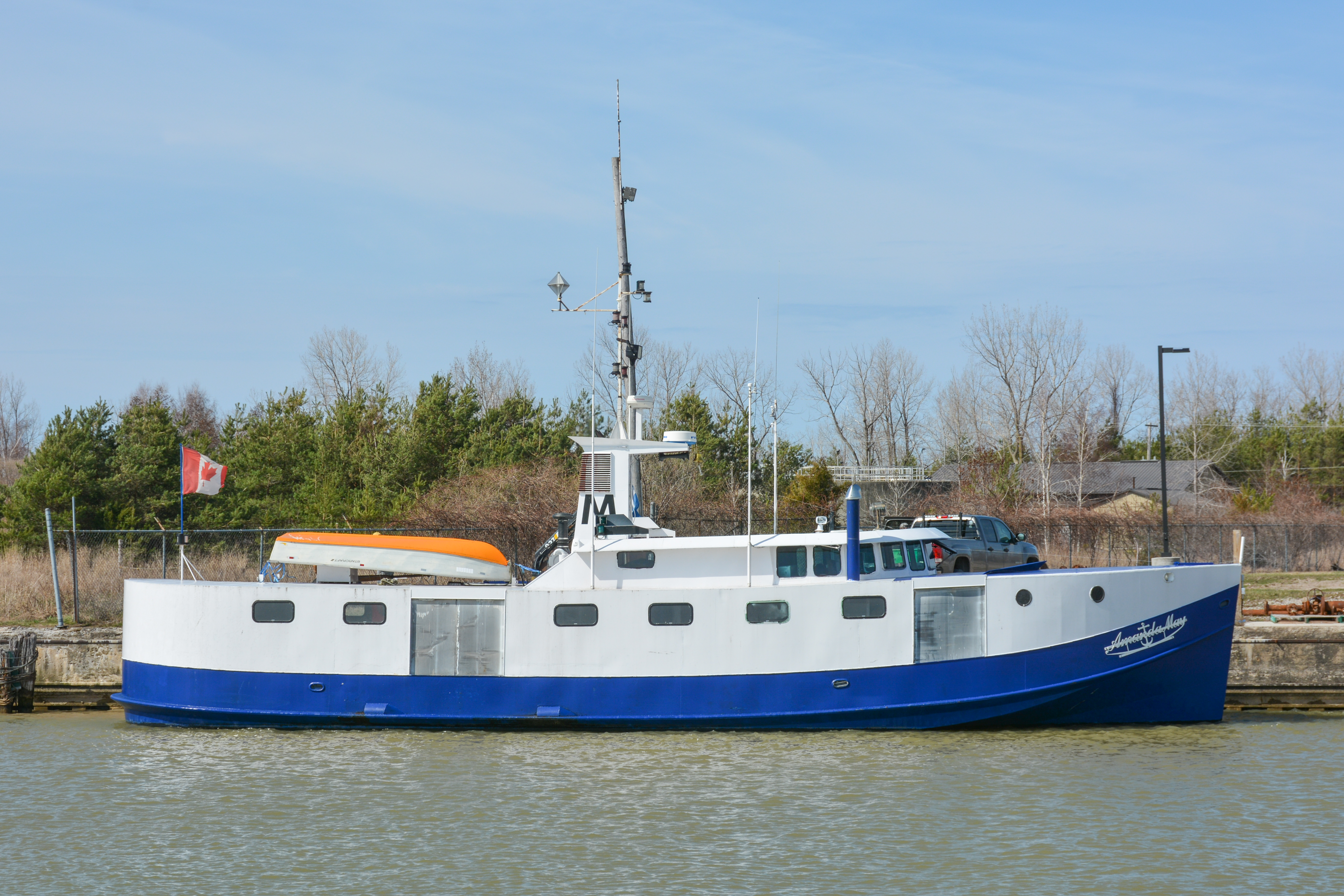
Typical modern fish tug at Port Burwell - enclosed design found to be safest and most efficient for Lake Erie fishery of walleye and yellow perch.

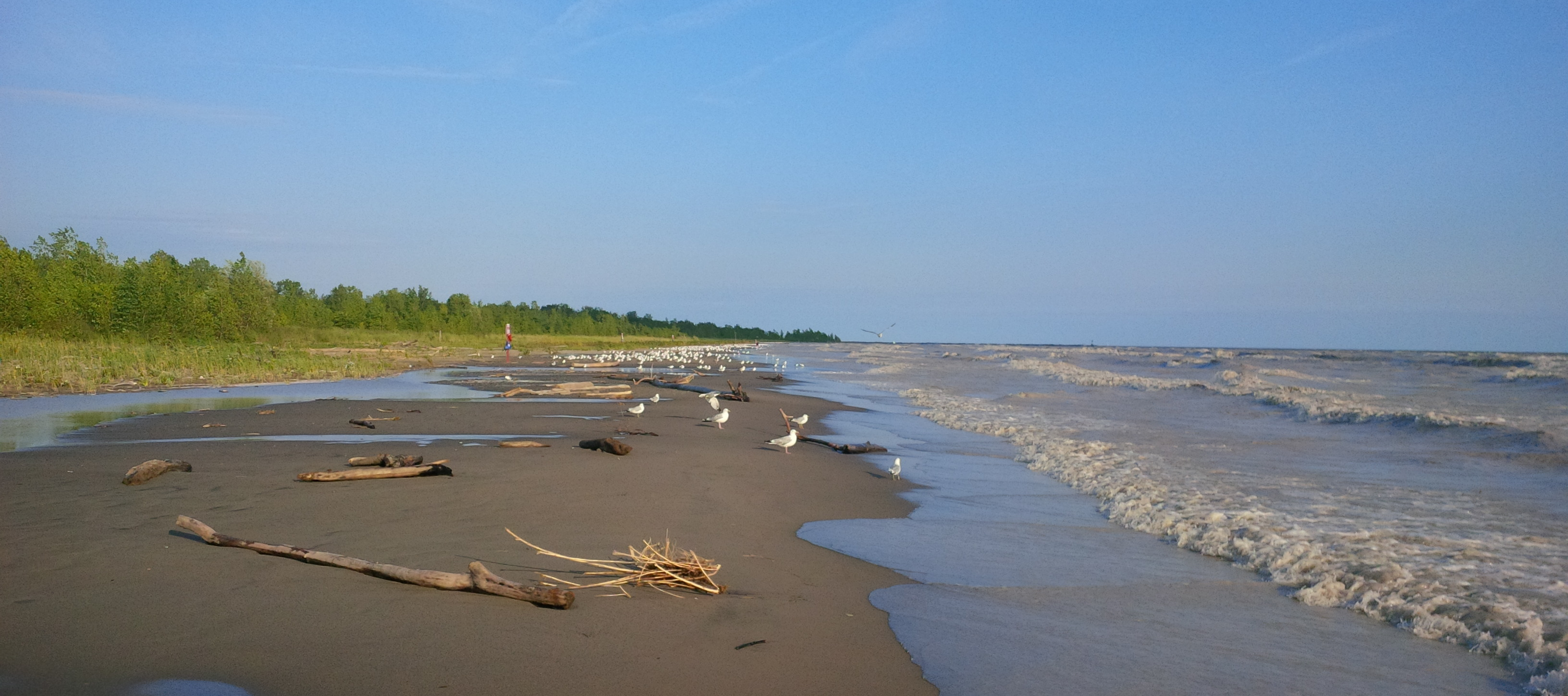
Long sandy shoreline at Port Burwell Provincial Park

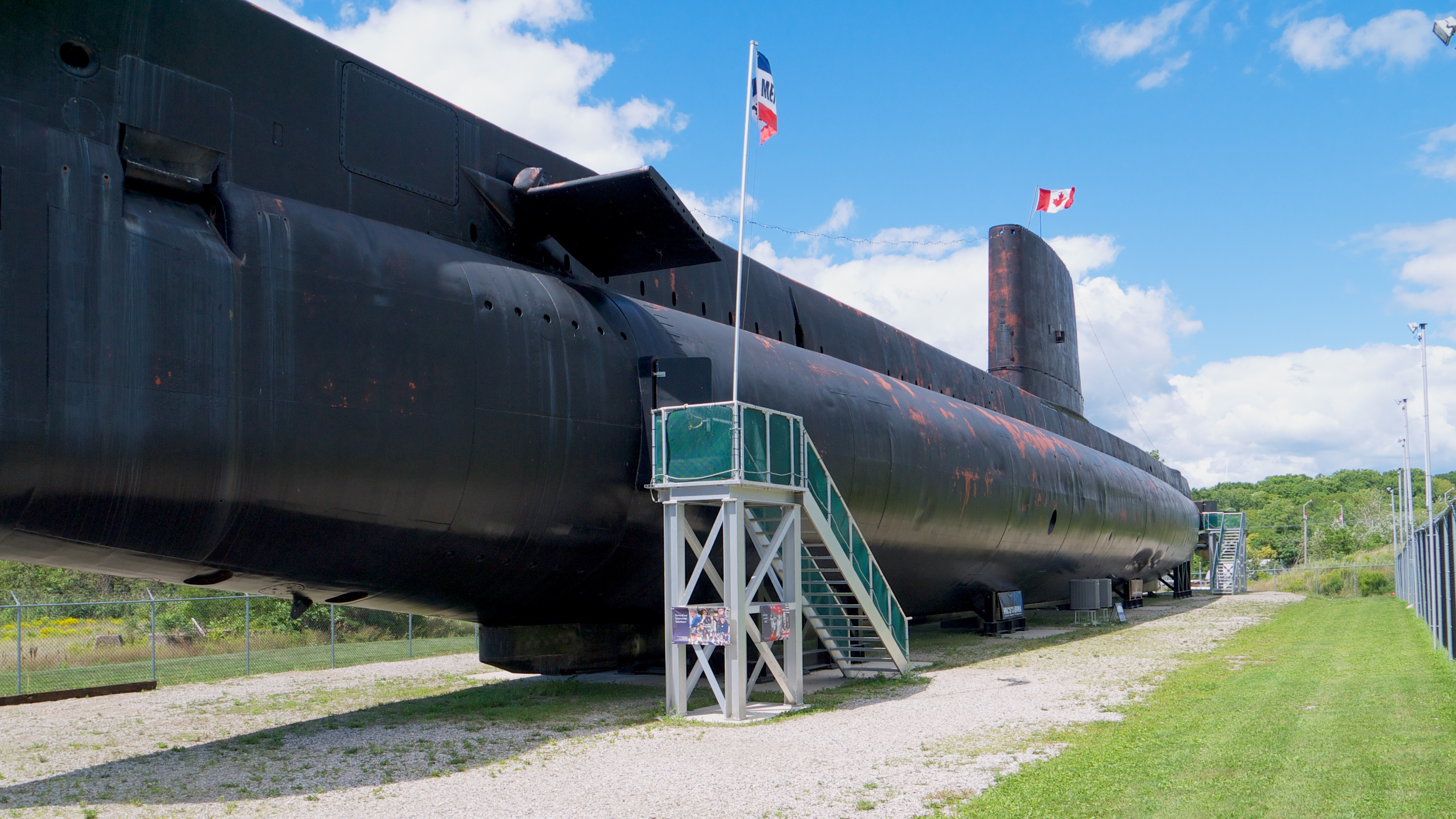
Retired Canadian Navy sub HMCS Ojibwa now part of the Museum of Naval History at Port Burwell

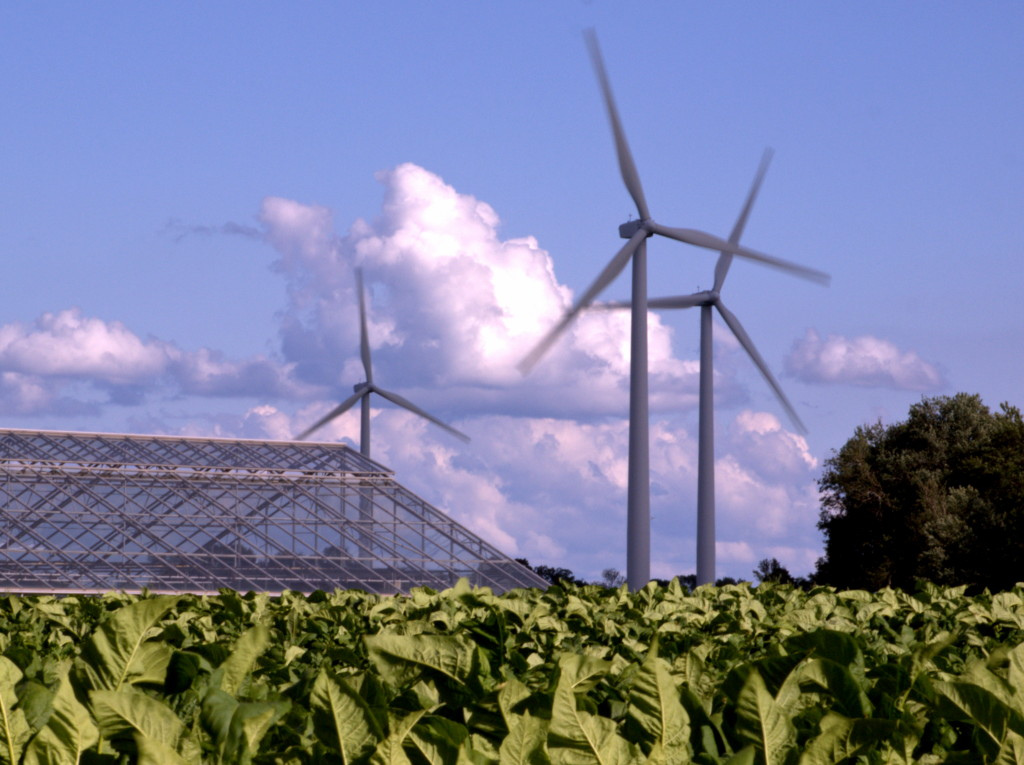
Wind farm turbines in tobacco fields around Port Burwell

In time Port Burwell became a shipbuilding and fishery harbour and the export point for lumber and farm produce from the surrounding townships and a large portion of Oxford County, boosted by construction of roads and railway lines. One of these, the Tillsonburg, Lake Erie & Pacific Railway, formed by a group of Tillsonburg businessmen, recognized the harbour's potential to receive coal from Pennsylvania for use in Oxford County and elsewhere, and pushed for a railway car ferry service across Lake Erie. Port Burwell's harbour was improved for this purpose in 1903, the Ashtabula railcar ferry began operating between Ashtabula, Ohio and Port Burwell to haul coal, and the rail line was built north through Vienna and Tillsonburg to Ingersoll by 1903, and to Embro by 1908 (plans to continue on to Stratford and Collingwood were scrapped). The line was eventually leased to the Canadian Pacific Railway to anchor the coal business, and the Ashtabula served Port Burwell bringing coal across the lake for half a century.

By the 1920s Port Burwell was becoming a summertime tourist destination famous for its sandy beaches, which had formed over the years as a natural result of wind and water currents interacting with the breakwaters extending out from the harbour mouth. This shoreline accumulation was a well-known phenomenon which also necessitated periodic dredging to keep the harbour clear. Port Burwell was also becoming a focus for natural gas drilling onshore as well as the collection point for pipelines from gas wells drilled offshore. It also gained fame as the home of McConnell Nurseries, which relied upon the sandy loam in nearby farmland and the reduced frost risk near the lakefront. It developed a nation-wide mail order business for seeds and plants and for many years was the largest employer in the area. The harbour's coal business changed when the Ashtabula was wrecked in a collision with a freighter in 1958, ending the railcar ferry's daily coal shipments. instead, the harbour became known for mountains of loose coal delivered by freighters for later pier-side loading into waiting railcars and transport trucks. All this was wound up after the federal government announced in 1970 it would no longer fund dredging of the harbour to support coal freighter traffic.

Most recently, Port Burwell has become the home of a windmill development feeding electricity into Ontario's power grid. In November 2012, HMCS Ojibwa—a retired Canadian Navy 'Cold War' submarine—was placed in a permanent site in Port Burwell as part of plans for a Museum of Naval History to complement the Port Burwell Marine Museum and Historic Lighthouse. A local theatre group was formed to cater to tourist business, inspired by the submarine project and by Theatre London, and now has its own Periscope Playhouse Cultural Centre in the village for theatrical and music performances.

Port Burwell was given separate status as a police village in 1900 and was incorporated as a village in 1949. It was reamalgamated with Bayham and the Village of Vienna to form an expanded Municipality of Bayham in 1998. Strong support is being given by the Municipality of Bayham to Port Burwell projects, including the financial burden that came with ensuring the Ojibwa project could continue while also making the Lighthouse museum a success and regularly improving the village's public beach and park facilities.

== Chronology ==
- 1812 – first settlers in what was originally known as Otter Creek
- 1829- The post office was established.
- 1830 – village plot surveyed by Mahlon Burwell on height of land above Lake Erie and east bank of Big Otter Creek; free village lots offered to settlers taking up residence; Customs tax officer appointed for harbour shipping
- 1832 – Port Burwell Harbour Company formed to improve and operate harbour, first tavern built, and construction of first church begun in village
- 1834 – first shipyard opened for schooner construction
- 1836 – population 200
- 1840 – lighthouse constructed on west edge of village land height (now part of Port Burwell Marine Museum and Historic Lighthouse)
- 1849 September – Ingersoll and Port Burwell Plank and Gravel Road Company formed to construct a toll road 31 miles in length, half in Oxford County (Ingersoll to Tillsonburg) and the remainder through Bayham township connecting Tillsonburg, Vienna and Port Burwell
- 1849 Dec 31 – export totals from area sawmills recorded for Port Burwell harbour: 8.4 million feet lumber, 3.1 million shingles, 119,155 staves, 193 vessels loaded
- 1851 – first steam-engine sawmill, with capacity to cut 1 million feet of lumber per annum
- 1852 – completion of final three-mile Port Burwell section of Ingersoll and Port Burwell Plank and Gravel Road
- 1877 – population 700
- 1895 – completion of railway line linking to Tillsonburg and Brantford
- 1899 May 12 – fire destroys entire business district on main street; rebuilt in the course of the following
- 1900 – organized under Ontario Municipal Act as a police village; harbour develops as major terminus for coal shipments into Ontario from Pennsylvania through harbour at Ashtabula, Ohio; sandy beaches running along lakeshore west of harbour for two miles increasingly drawing tourists for summer day visits
- 1949 – incorporated as a village under Ontario Municipal Act
- 1967 – Ontario government begins acquiring lakeshore property west of harbour for new provincial park
- 1971 – campground adjacent to beach area begins operation as Iroquois Beach Provincial Park
- 1983 – population 700
- 1986 – expanded lakeshore beach and parking areas and 230-site campground and nature trails on 243 hectares reopened as Port Burwell Provincial Park
- 1998 – merged with village of Vienna and Township of Bayham to form Municipality of Bayham as part of restructuring of Elgin County
- 2012 – retired cold war submarine HMCS Ojibwa installed as museum attraction
- 2016 – not-for-profit Periscope Playhouse Cultural Centre opened on Wellington Street opposite Royal Canadian Legion. Motto: Come for the beach, stay for the show!
- 2018 – wheelhouse from Great Lakes freighter installed as new attraction at Port Burwell Marine Museum and Historic Lighthouse

== Historic churches ==
Locations and histories of churches and cemeteries have been studied and documented extensively by the Elgin County branch of the Ontario Genealogical Society:

- Trinity Anglican Church – services continue in the picturesque 1836 edifice
- Baptist Church – the first congregation formed in 1819 north of the village site, built a church in 1835 that was taken apart and moved into the village in 1865 near the Anglican church; closed 1970, demolished 1986
- St Paul's United Church – first church (Methodist) completed 1852; new church on same site 1910, joined United Church movement in 1925; closed December 2014 when remaining congregation joined Straffordville church
- Free Methodist Church – the Methodists who chose not to join the United Church movement formed their own congregation using the old 1852 church, until it was closed in 1969
- Free Presbyterian Church – built 1867, closed in the 1870s, sold 1896
- St Joseph's Catholic Church – mission established 1937, first small church building 1941, new church 1966 closed 2004
- John Paul II Cultural Center – summer camp and retreat continues north of village
- Lighthouse Gospel Church – non-denominational services in the former St. Joseph's; separate services in German for local Mennonite congregation

== Notable people ==
- Leonidas Burwell (1818–1879), son of Mahlon, took over family's interests at Port Burwell in 1842 and made it his home
- Mary Ella Dignam (1857–1938) painter, teacher, and art organizer; born in Port Burwell
- Earl Hutchinson (1888–1976) railroad engineer, member of Legislative Assembly of Ontario; born in Port Burwell
- William James Hughes (1894–1979) Anglican bishop of British Honduras, first Bishop of Matabeleland, Archbishop of Central Africa; retired in 1970 to Canada, where he continued to minister at Holy Trinity, Port Burwell
- Charles Frederick (Fred) Bodsworth (1918–2012) writer, journalist and naturalist; born in Port Burwell

== See also ==
- Big Otter Creek
- Ontario Highway 19
- Port Burwell Marine Museum and Historic Lighthouse
- HMCS Ojibwa and Museum of Naval History
- Port Burwell Wind Farm
