= Dumas =

Dumas may refer to:

== Places ==
- Dumas, Arkansas, United States, a city
- Dumas, Mississippi, United States, a town
- Dumas, Missouri, United States, an unincorporated community
- Dumas, Texas, United States, a city
- Mount Dumas, a mountain on Campbell Island, New Zealand
- Dumas Beach, a beach southwest of Surat, Gujarat, India
- 9059 Dumas, an asteroid

== People ==
- Dumas (surname)
  - Most notably, Alexandre Dumas (1802–1870) French author and aristocrat
- Dumas (musician) (born 1979), Canadian singer born Steve Dumas
- Dumas Malone (1892–1986), Pulitzer Prize-winning American historian, biographer, and editor
- Dumas or Dumarsais Simeus (born 1939), Haitian-born American businessman who ran for president of Haiti

== Fictional characters ==
- Dumas (Kiba), a character in the Japanese anime Kiba
- Duke Dumas, ruler of the vampires in the video game Lunar Knights
- Dumas, a DC Comics character in the Manhunter comics

== Other uses ==
- Dumas High School, a high school in Arkansas
- Dumas Brothel, a bordello in Butte, Montana, United States
- Dumas House, an office building in Perth, Western Australia
- Dumas (film), a 2010 French film

== See also ==
- Dumas method
- Dumas method of molecular weight determination
- Duma (disambiguation)
