= Lion's Head Light =

- Lion's Head Lighthouse in the Bruce Peninsula
- Location: Georgian Bay; Ontario; Canada
- Coordinates: 44°59′26″N 81°14′53″W

Tower
- Constructed: 1903 (first); 1913 (second); 1969 (third)
- Construction: wooden tower (first, second and fourth) metal pole (third)
- Automated: 1969
- Height: 8 metres (26 ft)
- Shape: square tower with balcony and lantern
- Markings: white tower, red trim

Light
- First lit: 1983 (replica)
- Focal height: 8.5 metres (28 ft)
- Characteristic: red light, 2 s on, 2 s off

Lion's Head Lighthouse was a lighthouse on Georgian Bay, Ontario, Canada near the village of Lion's Head. A recent lighthouse was a replica built by local high school students. This was destroyed by several storms in the winter of 2019–2020.

== History ==
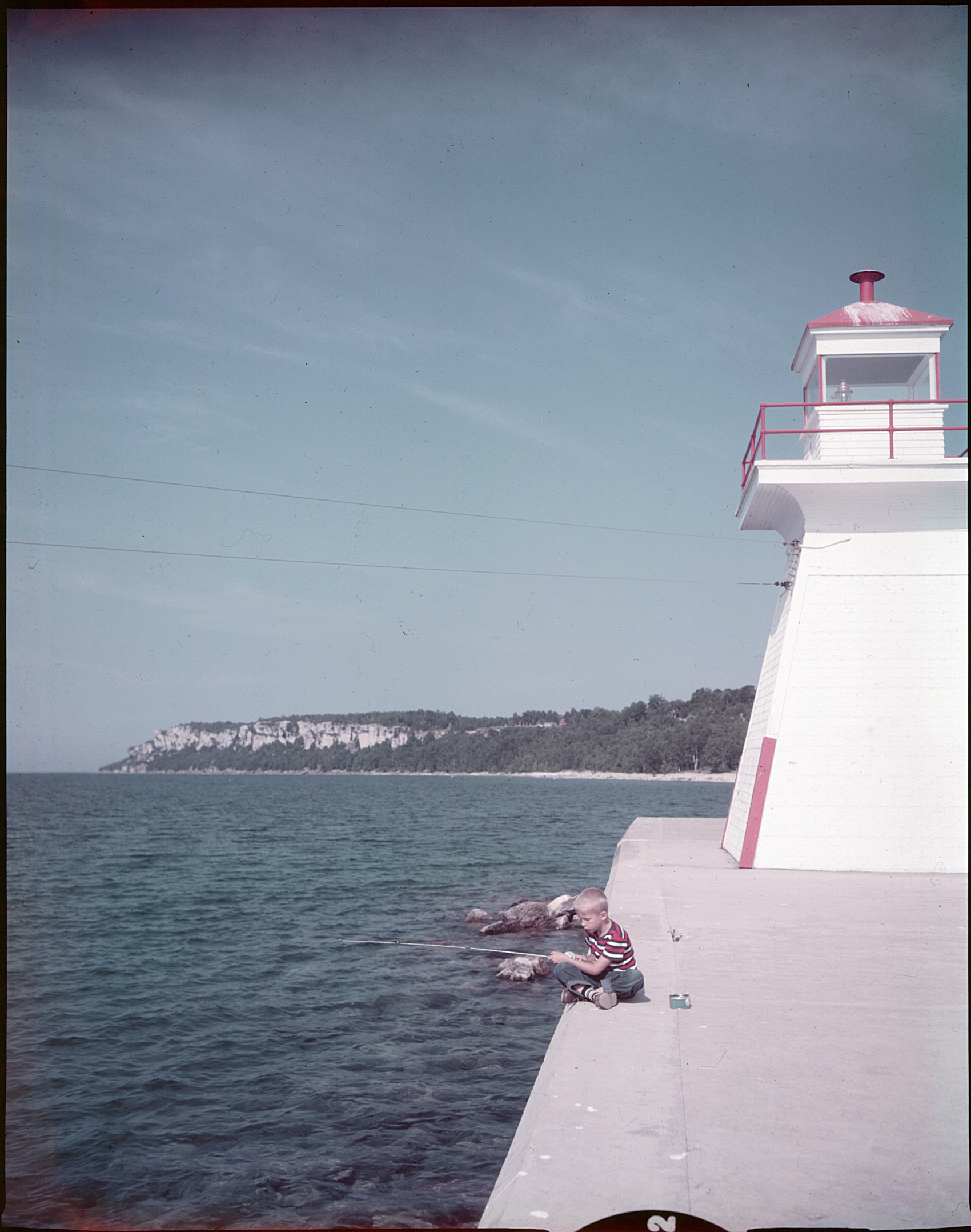
Boy fishing at Lion's Head Lighthouse, 1953

The first lighthouse was a lantern, which emitted a red light, erected atop a pole on the outer end of the breakwater in 1903. In 1913 a wooden square tower with a balcony and lantern was built on the breakwater, but it was severely damaged by the wind, though it was repaired. The lighthouse was then damaged by fire in 1933, and the Canadian Coast Guard dismantled it in 1969. It was replaced by a metal pole which emitted a flashing red light.

In 1983 the students of the Bruce Peninsula District School completed a replica of the old wooden lighthouse with funds from the Lion's Head Rotary Club; the lighthouse was placed on the shoreline. A violent storm damaged the operating light in the spring of 2000, and the Canadian Coast Guard decided to replace it with the students' replica, which was moved to the end of the pier and activated.

The replica lighthouse was damaged from time to time by storms due to its precarious position. Some damage occurred in October 2019. The lake-facing wall of the lighthouse had cedar shakes ripped off and a hole punched through it. The shoreline of the nearby stone beach was altered by severe wave action.

A storm on January 11, 2020, destroyed the lighthouse and reduced it to a pile of scattered lumber by the morning of January 12. The lighthouse has since been replaced by one that is in a slightly different location. The replacement has also been built to a sturdier standard.

== Keepers ==
- Charles Knapp 1903–1912
- Peter Webster Brady 1912–1924
- Ivan Butchart 1924–1956
- Ed Rouse 1956–1969

== See also ==
- List of lighthouses in Ontario
- List of lighthouses in Canada
