= Colchester Reef Light (Lake Erie, West) =

Lighthouse in Ontario, Canada

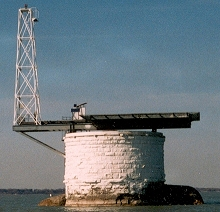
- 2003 Photograph of the south side of the Colchester Reef Lighthouse in Western Lake Erie. Original structure built in 1885 (white caisson pictured here) and existing helipad and tower were installed / updated in the early 1980s.
- Location: Western Lake Erie, Approx 4 Nautical Miles South of Colchester, Ontario, Canada
- Coordinates: 41°55′55.9″N 82°53′27.6″W (current)

Tower
- Constructed: 1885 (first)
- Foundation: stone caisson
- Construction: steel skeleton tower on cylindrical caisson
- Automated: 1936
- Height: 12 metres (39 ft)
- Shape: cylindrical stone caisson basement with white skeleton tower and helipad
- Markings: white / grey
- Operator: Canadian Coast Guard

Light
- Focal height: 21.6 metres (71 ft)
- Range: 5 nautical miles (9.3 km; 5.8 mi)
- Characteristic: Fl R 4s.

The Colchester Reef Light is an active lighthouse situated on Colchester Reef in the Western Basin of Lake Erie south of the town of Colchester, Ontario.

It was originally built in 1885 by Colonel William P. Anderson to replace a lightvessel that was previously stationed on that location. The original lighthouse tower was demolished in 1954 and the current structure is a white steel skeletal tower with a helicopter landing pad.

It is currently listed on the Canadian List of Lights as Light No. 620 and can be found on the Canadian Hydrographic Service Chart No. 2123.

== Architecture ==
This lighthouse was one of over 500 prominent lighthouses designed and built by William P. Anderson in the late 19th century and early 20th century.

Original architectural drawings from 1882 depict four floors and an attached fog bell tower accessible from the fourth floor. Two floors were designed to be finished living space for the light keeper with the lower (still existing) stone caisson used as a cellar.

== Current condition ==
The current skeletal tower and helicopter landing pad are often populated by cormorants and gulls. A noise making apparatus was installed in an attempt to scare away these birds. There is no longer a fog signal at this site.

The exposed location (particularly the south side) and northerly climate produced significant stresses on the original 1885 structure including fast moving ice during the winter months. The cement that surrounded the lighthouse's current stone caisson base has eroded on the south side revealing this ongoing damage. The mortar between the stone blocks has deteriorated and is in need of repair.

== See also ==
- List of lighthouses in Ontario
- List of lighthouses in Canada
- Colchester Reef Light – Same named lighthouse in Lake Champlain that was moved to the Shelburne Museum in Shelburne, Vermont in 1956
- Detroit River Light – Another lighthouse in the area also built in 1885.
