= Battle Island Light =

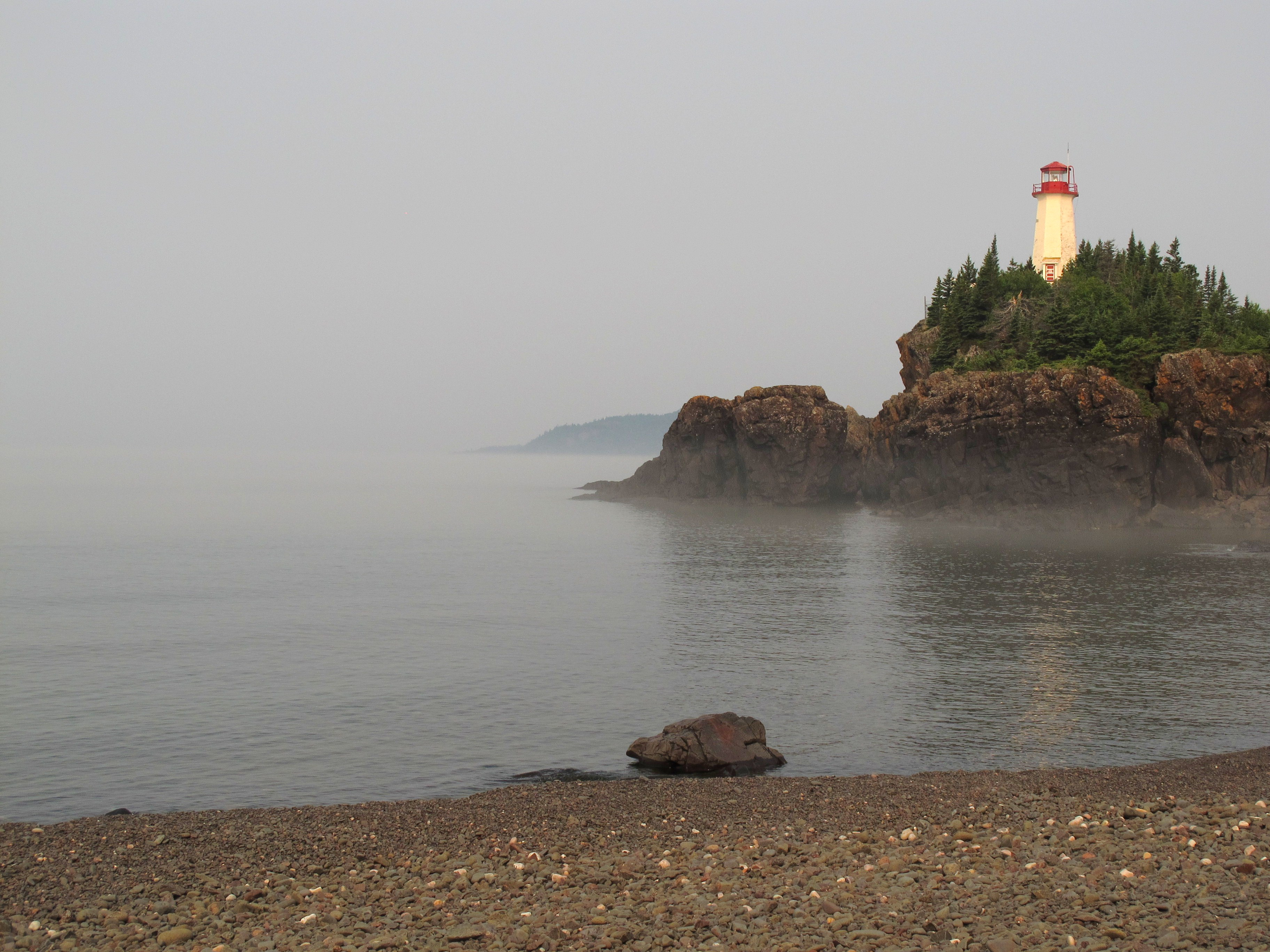
- Battle Island Lighthouse
- Location: Battle Island, Ontario
- Coordinates: 48°45′06.5″N 87°33′26.4″W

Tower
- Constructed: 1877 (first)
- Construction: wooden-frame (first) poured concrete tower (current)
- Automated: 1991
- Height: 43 feet (13 m)
- Shape: tapered octagonal tower with balcony and lantern
- Markings: white tower, red lantern
- Operator: Canadian Coast Guard

Light
- First lit: 1911 (current)
- Focal height: 117 feet (36 m)
- Range: 18 miles (29 km)
- Characteristic: Fl (3) W 24s.

Battle Island Light is a lighthouse on the Canadian shore of Lake Superior. It is located on the westerly point of Battle Island, 28.5 miles (45.9 km) east-northeast from Lamb Island Light.

It was built as a white light, visible for 18 miles (29 km) in clear weather. When built, it operated as a bright flash, four-second interval, bright flash, four-second interval, and then bright flash, 16-second interval, with a concurrent lower-strength light operating at 12-seconds constant/ 12 seconds eclipsed. Its fog horn (originally referred to as a "fog diaphone") blasted for 3½ seconds and was then silent for 26½ seconds. The lighthouse was rebuilt in 1915–16 in response to increased demand from local wood pulp carriers and commercial fishing boats.

== See also ==
- List of lighthouses in Ontario
- List of lighthouses in Canada
