= Port Burwell Marine Museum and Historic Lighthouse =

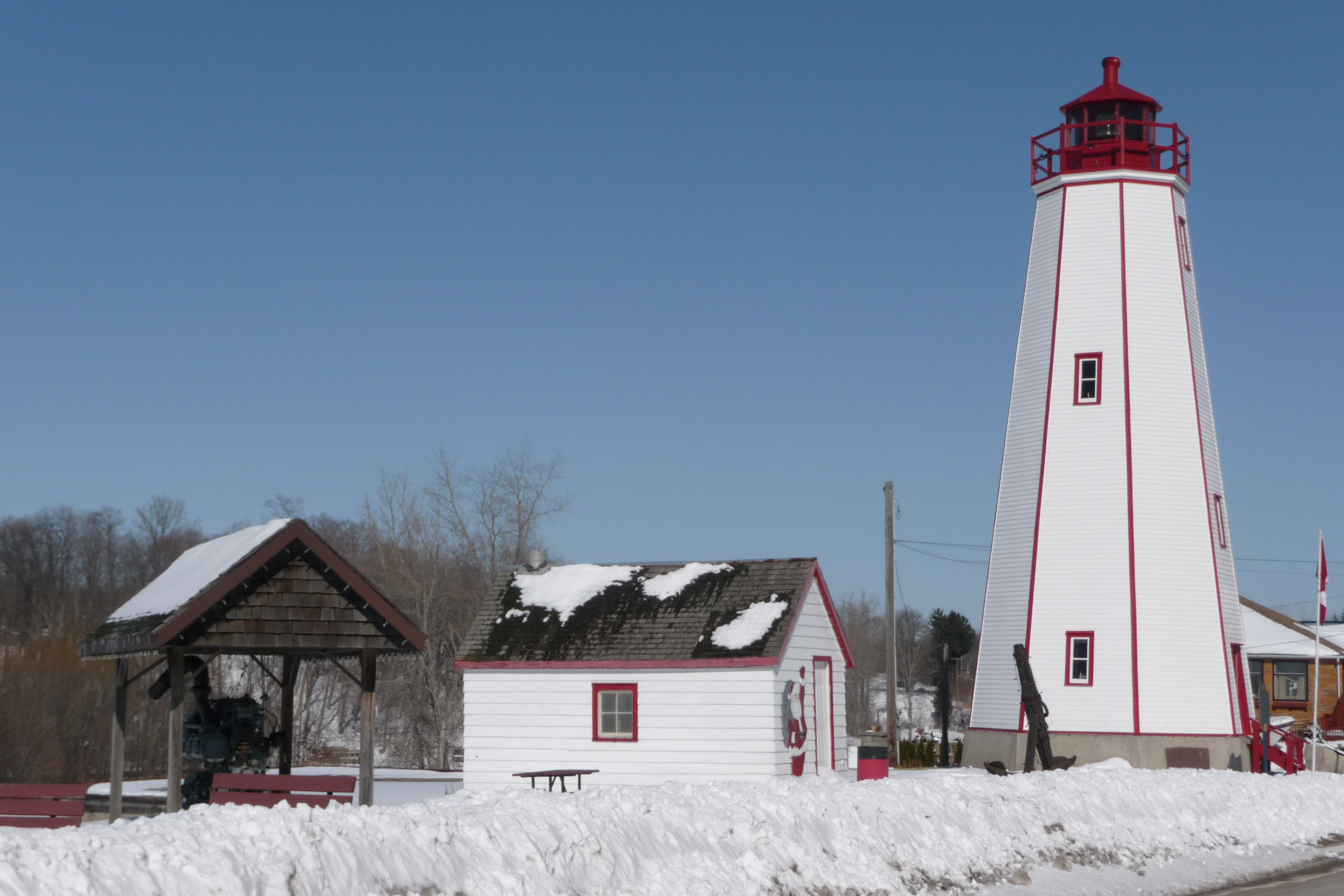
- Port Burwell Lighthouse in 2011
- Location: Port Burwell; Ontario; Canada
- Coordinates: 42°38′41″N 80°48′21″W

Tower
- Constructed: 1840
- Construction: structural wood
- Height: 13.7 metres (45 ft)
- Shape: octagonal tower
- Markings: white tower, red lantern
- Heritage: designated heritage property (part IV)

Light
- Deactivated: 1963
- Focal height: 29.3 metres (96 ft)
- Lens: third order Fresnel lens
- Range: 19 kilometres (12 mi)

Port Burwell Marine Museum and Historic Lighthouse is a historical museum in Port Burwell, Ontario, Canada. Located at the mouth of the Big Otter Creek on Lake Erie, the museum and lighthouse reflect upon when Port Burwell was at the height of its fame as a shipbuilding community.

== History ==
The lighthouse, completed in 1840 and renovated in the 1980s, remains one of Canada's oldest Lighthouses of a completely wooden construction. Present in the museum collection is the most accurate model ever built of the rail car ferry the Ashtabula, which made routine trips between Port Burwell and Ashtabula, Ohio for the purposes of transporting coal. This ship was a mainstay of the Port Burwell shipping experience until the 1950s and played an intricate role in the development of Southern Ontario through its supply of coal energy. The museum's collection includes original Fresnel lenses, finely detailed model ships and a vast assortment of tools, photographs, and artifacts dating from the 19th century.

== Affiliations ==
The Museum is affiliated with: CMA, CHIN, and Virtual Museum of Canada.

== See also ==
- List of lighthouses in Ontario
- List of lighthouses in Canada
