= Dumah =

Dumah can refer to

- Dumah (angel), an angel mentioned in rabbinical literature
- Dumah (Legacy of Kain), a character in the Legacy of Kain video game
- Dumah (son of Ishmael), the sixth son of Ishmael, thought to be the forefather of an Arab tribe named for him
- Dumat al-Jandal, an ancient city previously known as Dumah or Adummatu, associated with Dumah, the son of Ishmael
