= Otterville, Ontario =

Village in Norwich Township, Ontario, Canada

Coordinates: 42.926766°N 80.603342°W

Location of Otterville in Ontario

Otterville is a village in Norwich Township in Oxford County, Ontario, Canada. It is located on the Otter Creek with many historic features including Otterville Mill and Dam, Grand Trunk Station, African Methodist Episcopal Cemetery and a park.

== History ==
=== Early black settlement ===
Otterville was settled in 1807. Encouraged by local Quakers, free blacks and escaped slaves fled persecution in the United States and found homes in the Otterville area beginning in 1829. Otterville African Methodist Episcopal Church and Cemetery served the local black community until the late 1880s. The cemetery is one of the few preserved black pioneer burial grounds in the province and dates from 1856. In 1982 during the 175th anniversary celebrations of the community, a plaque was placed at the cemetery to commemorate the historical black settlement.

== Attractions ==
=== The Otterville Mill ===
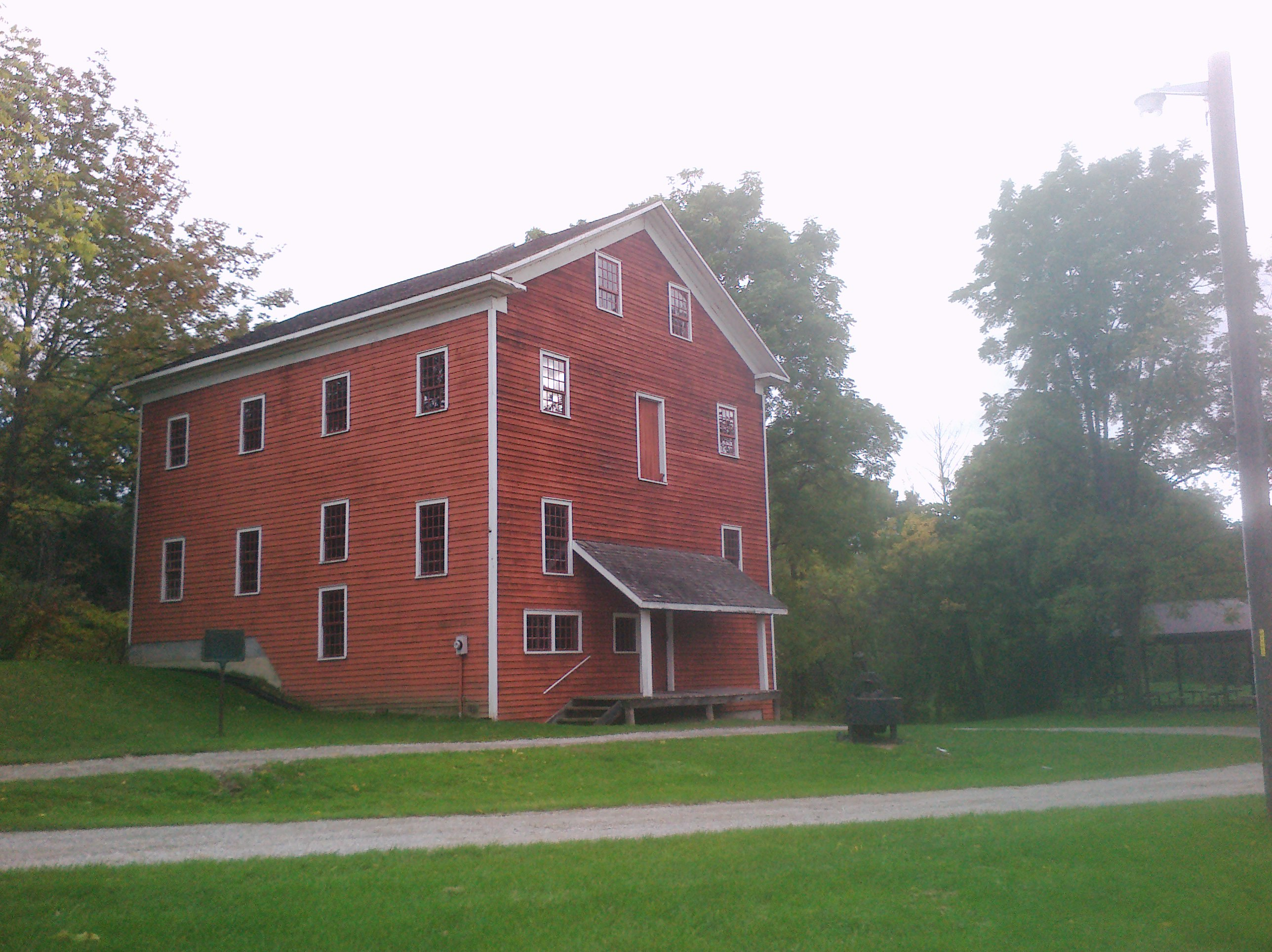
Otterville mill

Built in 1845 by Edward Bullock, the mill is run by water power supplied by a dam on the river. The first mill on the site was built, in 1807, by partners John Earle and Paul Averill Jr. The Averill family was from the Great Barrington area in Massachusetts, where Thomas Ingersoll had lived before coming to Oxford. Paul Averill, Sr. had developed mills in Townsend township in the 1790s. John Earle married Paul's daughter Mary and with Paul Averill Jr. managed the Townsend mills. In 1806, Earle purchased the land surrounding the mill site at Otterville and with his brother-in-law Paul (sometimes referred to as Paul Avery) built the first mill on the site. The South Norwich Historical Society, on a lease basis, maintains this historic site and offers tours on request. The mill and its surrounding meadow is the site of an annual barbecue.

=== G.T.R. Station Museum and Blacksmith Shop ===
The South Norwich Historical Society has restored this 1875 station to its condition as an 1881 Grand Trunk Railway station. The waiting room and office are restored authentically, the baggage room is an interpretation room for displays of the area's history. Permanent displays feature railway construction of the 1880s with many artifacts of all periods. The Underground Railroad and early Black settlement of the area is another highlight, as well as the story of early Quaker heritage in the area.

=== Otterville Park ===
Just north of the main corner, and through the stone gates, is 10 acres (40,000 m^{2}) of pine-forested parkland, with a swimming pool, baseball diamond, horseshoe pitch, tennis and basketball courts, and children's playground.

=== St. John's Anglican Church - 23 Dover Street ===
One of the first churches established in the township

== Education ==
Otterville had one school that was closed and sold in 2012, Otterville Public School, which was operated by the Thames Valley District School Board.

== Library ==
The Otterville Public Library is a branch of the Oxford County Library.

== Notable residents ==
- Felix Douma (scholar, writer, teacher, cellist, and translator) immigrated to Otterville at the age of 12.
- Harold Innis (professor of economics, historian, and writer) was born and raised in Otterville
