= Felix Douma =

Canadian scholar, writer, teacher, cellist, and translator (1941–2008)

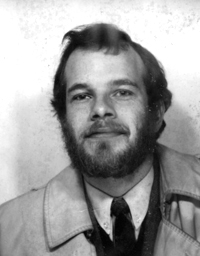
- Felix Douma c.1975
- Born: August 6, 1941; Heerenveen, Friesland, Netherlands
- Died: January 23, 2008 (aged 66); Port Rowan, Ontario, Canada
- Citizenship: Canadian
- Occupations: Writer, teacher, Cellist, translator, Diplomat, publisher, scholar
- Writing career
- Genre: Fiction
- Notable works: Moonyass, The Magic Fish

Felix Johan Douma (August 6, 1941 – January 23, 2008) was a Canadian scholar, writer, teacher, cellist, and translator who once served as Canada's Third Secretary and Vice-Consul to the Dominican Republic.

== Biography ==
Douma was born in Heerenveen, Friesland, Netherlands, to Sjoeke Tjerk (George) and Johanna (née Wijnja) Douma. After World War II, at the age of 12, Douma immigrated with his parents and two younger brothers, Alex and Ed, to Otterville, Ontario, Canada where he became a Canadian citizen. He attended South Norwich Public School, and later earned his high school diploma with honors as Valedictorian from Norwich District High School in nearby Norwich, Ontario.

After earning his Bachelor of Arts degree from the University of Western Ontario and his Master of Arts from the University of Toronto, Douma was hired as an officer with Canada's Department of External Affairs. He was posted to the Dominican Republic as Third Secretary and Vice-Consul from 1966 to 1968.

Douma earned the distinction of Canada Council doctoral fellow from 1968 to 1973.

Douma was frequent lecturer in English at Huron University College and the University of Western Ontario in 1973 and 1974.

In 1975, Douma began his teaching career at Big River Indian reserve (Cree), a primary school near Victoire Saskatchewan. This experience inspired Douma's first book, "MOONYASS", in which he describes what life was like in and around an Indian school during a year on the reserve. During this time, Douma earned a citation for bravery from the Canadian Red Cross Society in Regina, Saskatchewan for an incident in which he came to the aid of some children in peril at a nearby lake.

For most of the 1980s Douma taught English and French at Orchard Park Secondary School, Stoney Creek, Ontario, and Winona High School, Wentworth County, Ontario. During this time, he played third cello with the Mississauga Symphony Orchestra in Mississauga, Ontario.

In the mid-1990s Douma opened a cultural center for Port Rowan, which he affectionately named "The Hobby Palace". He would often host concerts, art exhibitions and other cultural pursuits. In addition, he ran a small publishing company named "Leeboard Press". The press published some of his own works, the final works of Robert Finch, and some postcards and other printed material.

Douma retired from teaching in 1990 after a twelve-year leg instructing English, and English as a Second Language at Valley Heights Secondary School in Norfolk County, Ontario.

In 1992, Douma wrote his second book "The Magic Fish". This book contains six stories for children, inspired by his time almost 20 years earlier at the Little Creek Indian reserve in northern Saskatchewan.

Douma continued to publish papers, articles and essays and was a frequent contributor to the "Port Rowan Good News" during his retirement.

On January 23, 2008, Douma died at his home in Port Rowan Ontario at 66 years of age.

== Education ==
Douma earned his first post secondary degree with a BA in English and Philosophy at the University of Western Ontario in 1960.

He attained a Master of Arts in Philosophy at the University of Toronto in 1964.

Douma returned to his birth country of the Netherlands, where he earned a Doctorandus in Letters, Comparative Literature and Translation Studies at the University of Amsterdam in 1972.

Douma returned to the University of Toronto for further qualifications for instructing English as a Second Language, French and Music. He earned the OSSTF Rating of IV, and a Bachelor of Education degree in 1979

== Distinctions ==
- Citation for Bravery, Canadian Red Cross Society Regina Saskatchewan, 1975
- Canada Council Doctoral Fellow 1968–73
- Massey College Junior Fellow 1965–66
- Gold Medal in English and philosophy, University of Western Ontario, 1964
- Ontario Scholarship, 1960

== Publications ==
- "Grammar in the Later Philosophy of Ludwig Wittgenstein", University of Toronto, 1965 (Thesis)
- "The Profile of Death: A Study in Contemporary Dutch Literature", University of Amsterdam, 1970 (Thesis)
- "F.Sparshott, The Concept of Criticism", Dutch Quarterly Review, Vol. 1, 1971 (Review)
- "On Reviewing a Translation: A Practical Problem in Literary Criticism". Meta Translators' Journal, Presses du l'Université de Montréal, Vol 17 No 2, Juin 1972 (Article)
- O.B. Hardison Jr. (ed.), "The Quest for Imagination", Dutch Quarterly Review, Vol. IV, 1972 (Review)
- "'Serpentina's Petticoat' by Jan Wolkers", The Malahat Review, University of Victoria, No. 27. July 1973 (Translation)
- "G.K. Van Het Reve's English Prose Style", Spektator, University of Amsterdam, Vol.III No. 1, November 1973 (Article)
- "An Afternoon with Dad" by Willy Lauwens, Delta, Amsterdam, Fall Issue, 1973 (Translation)
- "The Pointing Game", Query, Saskatchewan Reading Council, Vol. 6 No. 1 Summer 1975 (Article)
- "Young Bucks" by Nescio, The Malahat Review, University of Victoria, No. 40, October 1976
- "The House Without a Chimney" Inside Outside, ed. Jack Booth, Holt Rinehart & Winston, Toronto 1978 pp. 346–351 (Short Story)
- "A Lesson in English Pronunciation," Query, Saskatchewan Reading Council, Vol. 8, No. 4, December 1978, pp 9–11 (Article)
- "The Mooch" by Nescio, The Malahat Review, University of Victoria, No. 54, March 1980 (translation)
- "The Big Boulder", Time Enough... ed. Jack Booth, Holt Rinehart & Winston, Toronto 1979, pp 300–307 (Short Story)
- "Secrecy in the Schools", Comment on Education, Vol. 10, No. 2 (December 1979) pp. 15–15 (article)
- "Moonyass", Leeboard Press, 1990 (Novel)
- "The Magic Fish and Other Stories From the Little Creek Reserve", Leeboard Press, 1992 (Short Stories)

Several dozen book and concert reviews and articles by Felix Douma have appeared in The Simcoe Reformer and The Port Rowan Good News in the period 1988–2008. Douma read many stories such as "The White Woman," "The Terrible Stranger," "The Bear and the Raven," and "The Magic Fish" on CJRT-FM (Toronto's) programming "Stories and Music for Children."

Felix Douma has also prepared a translation of the second edition of G. Hulshoff, The Six Suites for Violoncello Solo by Johann Sebastian Bach: A Handbook on Bach's Music for Violoncello Solo, originally published by Van Loghum Slaterus, Arnhem, The Netherlands, in 1962. Translation published and available from Leeboard Press, Hockley Valley Ontario.
