= Venison Creek (Ontario) =

Stream in Norfolk County, Ontario, Canada

Coordinates: 42°39′09″N 80°32′38″W

Venison Creek

Venison Creek is the largest tributary to Big Creek, in the Long Point Region Conservation Area, on the north shore of Lake Erie, in Ontario, Canada.

The watershed was originally heavily wooded, until settlers of European descent cleared the land for farming.

Fish generally found in Venison Creek are northern pike, rainbow trout, brook trout, panfish, carp, smallmouth bass and brown trout. Catching a fish in this creek is generally the best between 6 AM and 12 PM and becoming sub-optimal between 6 PM and 6 AM.
