= Big Otter Creek =

Coordinates: 42°38′23″N 80°48′27″W

Big Otter Creek (alternately Otter River, Big Creek) is a waterway that empties into Lake Erie at Port Burwell, Ontario. It is 42 kilometres (26 mi) long, and the area of its drainage basin is 712 square kilometres (275 sq mi). The creek's headwaters are north of the Horseshoe Moraine, and its mouth is just west of the Long Point Conservation Area. Scenic bluffs line the valley as it passes through the moraine.

== Carolinian forest ==
Most of southern Ontario was covered by Carolinian forest, characterized by large, slow-growing hardwood trees, like Oak and Beech. Very few stands of old growth Carolinian forest remain. Between Delhi and Lynedoch, the creek passes through a 5 kilometres (3.1 mi) long incisized valley that has stands of old growth that add up to 259.37 hectares (1.0014 sq mi) in area.

== Communities ==
The creek passes through the communities of Norwich, Otterville, Tillsonburg, Vienna, and Port Burwell.

== See also ==
- List of rivers of Ontario
