= Horseshoe Moraine =

Coordinates: 43.4969°N 80.1914°W

The Horseshoe Moraine is the name for a series of moraines that cover much of southern Ontario, west of the Niagara Escarpment. A lobe of the horseshoe moraine abuts the well-known Oak Ridges Moraine in the extreme west of the headwaters of the Humber River.

The 150 kilometres (93 mi) long Paris-Galt Moraines are considered part of the Horseshoe Moraines.
