= Toronto Harbour Light =

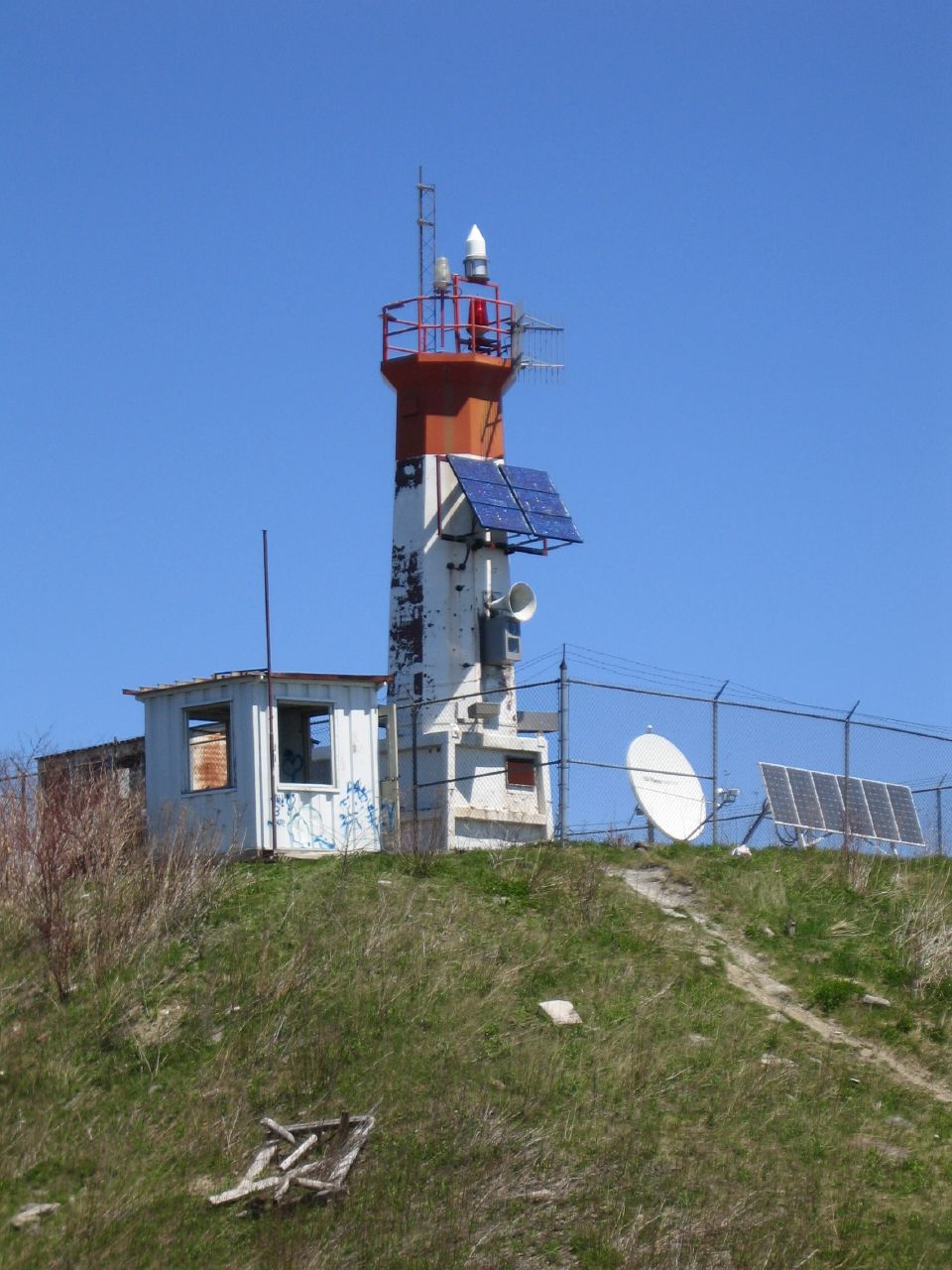
- The Toronto Harbour Light
- Location: Tommy Thompson Park, Toronto
- Coordinates: 43°36′49″N 79°20′36″W

Tower
- Constructed: 1974
- Construction: Concrete and steel
- Height: 12 metres (39 ft)
- Shape: Octagonal
- Markings: Bright white lower, dotted by graffiti, dull reddish-orange upper
- Operator: PortsToronto

Light
- Focal height: 22 metres (72 ft)
- Lens: Lexan circular lens
- Characteristic: Fl R 10s.

The Toronto Harbour Light is an automated lighthouse at Vicki Keith Point on the Leslie Street Spit in Toronto, Ontario, Canada.

== Construction ==
The concrete structure was completed in 1974 by the Toronto Harbour Commission. It is now operated by the Toronto Port Authority. The lighthouse is powered by a solar panel and directs shipping traffic along the Eastern Channel into the Toronto Inner Harbour. The light replaced the outer and inner pier lights on the east side of the Eastern Gap from 1906. The larger tower was relocated to Monica Cruising Club in 1981 and smaller one to Etobicoke Yacht Club.

Maintenance on the property is limited and methods of power have varied over the years. A generator is on site, but is not used and is in disrepair. The site is fenced off yet prone to vandalism and graffiti. Various structures sit idle at the site, such as a ground-mounted solar panel in disrepair, a satellite dish, an unoccupied hut, and a separate hut containing a visibly arson-damaged diesel generator, along with control equipment.

== See also ==
- List of lighthouses in Ontario
- List of lighthouses in Canada
