= Venison Creek (Wisconsin) =

- Location of mouth

Location
- Country: United States
- State: Wisconsin

Physical characteristics
- Mouth
  - coordinates: 45°57′54″N 91°04′48″W

Venison Creek is part of the Chequamegon-Nicolet National Forest.
