= Paris-Galt Moraine =

The Paris-Galt Moraine are a pair of glacial moraines left behind by the Laurentian glaciation, in southern Ontario. The moraines run parallel, and sometimes merge.

The Moraine system extends from the Caledon area to an area southwest of Port Rowan — a distance of approximately 150 kilometres (93 mi).

In 2007, Guelph city council requested the Province to assist in adding undeveloped portions of the moraines, within city limits, to the Province's greenbelt plan. But, by 2009, the city reversed its position, and develop its moraine lands, after all.
