= Big Creek (Lake Erie) =

Creek in Norfolk County, Ontario

Big Creek is a watercourse in Norfolk County, Ontario. It is approximately 60 kilometres (37 mi) long. It empties into Lake Erie, at Port Rowan, at Long Point. Its watershed covers 730 square kilometres (280 sq mi), alternately 750 square kilometres (290 sq mi).

The largest municipality it flows through is Delhi, Ontario. North Creek joins it there. Venison Creek joins downstream of Walsingham. The creek is the largest watershed in the Long Point Region. Small dams riddle the watershed. Three of the larger reservoirs are the Teeterville Reservoir on Big Creek, the Lehman Reservoir on North Creek, and the Deer Creek reservoir.

Eco-tourists visit the creek, including boating excursions, to sample its examples of Carolinian forest - rare for Ontario.

Canoeing down Big Creek is generally done between May 15 and September 15. It takes 6 hours to canoe from the Langton area to the Long Point area.

In 1986 the United Nations designated the Big Creek Marsh, at the mouth of Big Creek, forming the apex of Long Point, as forming the Long Point Biosphere Reserve. Lake Erie has a clockwise current. Long Point formed when that current carried suspended sediment, that formed the sand spit that forms the spine of the peninsula. The east side of the spit was a natural, marshy, wetland, until the construction of the Long Point Causeway in 1927.

== See also ==
- List of rivers of Ontario
