= Nanticoke Creek (Ontario) =

Watercourse in Ontario, Canada

Coordinates: 42°47′51″N 80°04′07″W

Nanticoke Creek is a watercourse in Haldimand County, Ontario. It is approximately 15 kilometres (9.3 mi) long, emptying into Lake Erie approximately 15 km west of the mouth of the Grand River. The creek drains approximately 180 square kilometres (69 sq mi).

The small village of Nanticoke, Ontario, was founded at its mouth between 1830 and 1850. The Nanticoke were a dependent nation of the Iroquois Confederacy.

== See also ==
- List of rivers of Ontario
