= Kincardine, Ontario (community) =

Kincardine
- Community
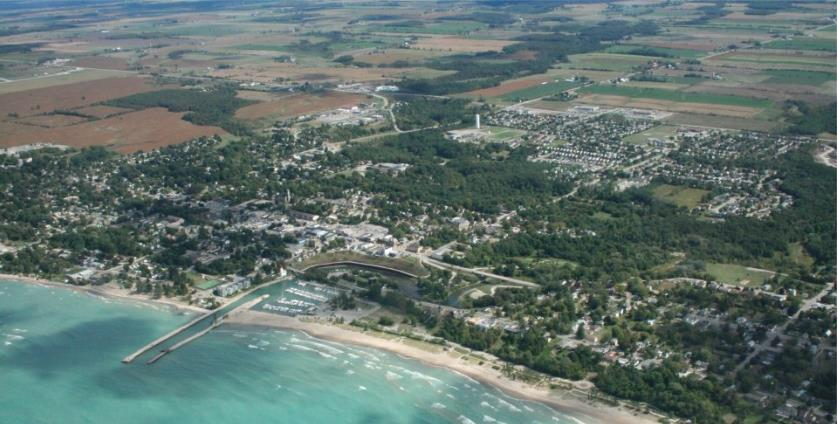
- Aerial view of Kincardine

- Location in southern Ontario
- Coordinates: 44°10′35″N 81°38′09″W
- Country: Canada
- Province: Ontario
- County: Bruce County
- Municipality: Kincardine
- Time zone: UTC-5 (EST)
  - Summer (DST): UTC-4 (EDT)

Kincardine is a community and former town, located in the municipality of Kincardine on the shores of Lake Huron in Bruce County in the province of Ontario, Canada. The namesake town is located at the mouth of the Penetangore River, and was founded in 1848 by the name of Penetangore. The current municipality was created in 1999 by the amalgamation of the Town of Kincardine, the Township of Kincardine, and the Township of Bruce. The former town is Ward 1 within the current municipal boundaries.

The locals of the area still use the former town's motto: "Where You're A Stranger Only Once".

== Tourist attractions ==
Kincardine is known for its sandy beaches including Station Beach, located at the mouth of the Penatangore River. Adjacent to the beach is Kincardine Harbour and Kincardine's lighthouse where the "Phantom Piper" pipes down the sun every evening (except Saturdays) in the summer through to Labour Day. On summer Saturday evenings Kincardine hosts a Pipe Band Parade where the Kincardine Scottish Pipe Band parades from Victoria Park down Queen Street. Once the band has passed, onlookers join in the parade and continue to march down Queen Street behind the band. Kincardine is also home to the Kincardine Theatre Guild.

== Census data ==
Kincardine is a municipality located on the shores of Lake Huron in Bruce County in the province of Ontario, Canada. The current municipality was created in 1999 by the amalgamation of the Town of Kincardine, the Township of Kincardine, and the Township of Bruce.

The full municipality had a population of 12,268 in the Canada 2021 Census.

In the Canada 2011 Census, the community of Kincardine was also counted as a population centre, with its own census data aggregated separately from that for the municipality as a whole. The population centre had a population of 6,725, representing 60 per cent of the population of the entire municipality of Kincardine.

== History ==
On March 5, 1848, Captain Alexander M. MacGregor sailed his little schooner "THE FLY" into the mouth of the Penetangore River. In Ojibwa, Penetangore means "river with sand on one side". This refers to the sand bar at the mouth of the river. Settlers Allan Cameron and William Withers landed their ship at the site of the modern-day town, in that part of Canada West known only as the Queen's Bush, and founded a community called Penetangore. Near where they landed they built a log cabin in which Cameron ran a hotel. Withers built a dam and a sawmill which was opened the following year (1849). By the winter of 1848/49 seven families inhabited the settlement.

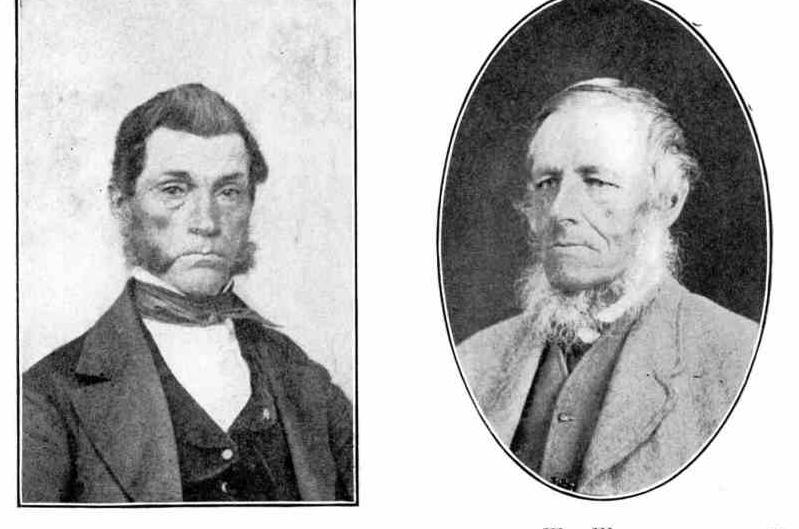
Kincardine Founders: Allan Cameron and William Withers

On January 1, 1850, the Queen's Bush was divided into counties, and the counties were divided into townships. Penetangore now found itself located within the Township of Kincardine in the County of Bruce. Both the township and the county were named after James Bruce, 8th Earl of Elgin and 12th Earl of Kincardine.

Francis 'Paddy' Walker arrived in Kincardine (then Penetangore) driving from Goderich on the ice along the Lake Shore, in a horse drawn cutter in the spring of 1850. He brought with him his wife, Jane, and their seven sons. The Walker House Hotel was built that same year, overlooking the Penetangore River.

The sand flats later became the harbour and the centre of intense commercial and industry activity.

An outstanding example of the pioneer entrepreneurs who helped create strong communities, Mr. Walker also operated a schooner, Mud Turtle, and was a contractor on the Durham Road as it was cut eastward through the bush from Kincardine.

In the summer of 1851, the Durham Road finally reached its terminus at Penetangore, and allowed access to the settlement by land. The road would be considered nearly impassable by today's standards, but at the time represented a significant improvement in communication and trade. A post office was established at Penetangore in the same year.

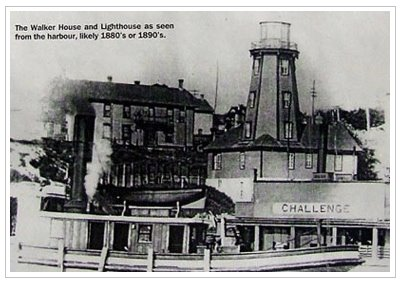
The Walker House and lighthouse as seen from the harbour, in the 1880s.

In the early years of Bruce County, Kincardine was the only township with any appreciable settlement, and served as the seat of local government for the entire county. Tensions eventually rose to the point where this arrangement could no longer be maintained, and on January 1, 1854, several new municipalities were formed, leaving only Kinloss Township and Bruce Township in union with Kincardine. Kinloss subsequently separated in 1855, and Bruce in 1856.

Over this time, the name Penetangore had gradually fallen out of favour, and was officially discontinued (except with regard to the river) when the Village of Kincardine was incorporated on January 1, 1858.

Kincardine's first school was opened in the summer of 1851. The building was situated on the flats near the mouth of the river. This was the school until 1855 when a permanent building was secured. During the years 1856 to 1866, a long, convoluted political battle was fought over the location of the county seat. Kincardine and Walkerton were the main contenders, and the latter finally emerged victorious. Kincardine would continue to dominate the county economically, but had clearly lost much of its early political primacy.

To help govern the growing town a Town Hall was erected in December 1872 at the cost of $8000. On the first floor of the building it had municipal rooms, a caretaker's apartment and a fire hall, while the basement was a detention room and had several storage areas. The 2nd floor was an auditorium for town speeches and community plays.

In 1874 James Watson and Andrew Malcolm opened Watson and Malcolm, a furniture company. After the death of its founders the company was renamed Andrew Malcolm Furniture Company.

With a new town council a law passed in 1874 stated that Kincardine was to be enforced by one constable. The first constable was Mr. William Purves. His office was in his home, identified by a large sign over his front door which read "POLICE." As the town constable he would have many responsibilities including: tavern inspector, street inspector, caretaker of the town hall, and ringer of the town bell (at the town hall) which rang 5 times a day.

On December 29, 1874, the last nail was driven on the new 67 miles of rail of the Wellington, Grey and Bruce Railway Company. The railway brought many new settlers into Kincardine which kickstarted a huge industrial expansion for the small village.

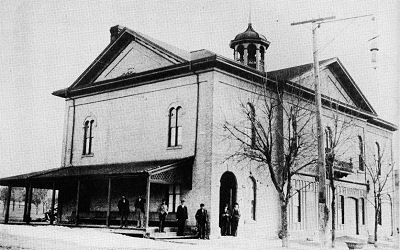
The Old Town Hall Circa 1900

The Village of Tiverton, located on the boundary between Kincardine Township and Bruce Township, was incorporated in 1879. To protect ships using the busy harbour, the Kincardine lighthouse was built in 1881.[2]

At some point during the late 1800s or early 1900s, the Village of Kincardine became the Town of Kincardine.

In 1902 F. E. Coombe and James Watson formed a partnership and began the operating the Coombe and Watson Furniture Company. In 1929 the company was renamed Coombe Furniture Co. Ltd. Coombe Furniture is recognized worldwide. When the Queen visited Charlottetown, Prince Edward Island, her suite was furnished with Coombe furniture. The company closed in 1973 when people started buying cheaper furniture, instead of the pricey but life-lasting Coombe furniture.

The Kincardine Public Library building at 727 Queen Street was constructed in 1908 with funding from a $5,000 Carnegie grant.

Kincardine and District General Hospital was first proposed in November, 1908, by Madame Josephine Gualco, a wealthy, widely travelled European lady who, between her many trips to Europe, made her home in Kincardine. She had purchased the Grant property on Queen Street North and proposed to donate it along with $2,500 annually for the creation of a hospital to serve Kincardine and surrounding district. The hospital was incorporated on December 17, 1908, under the Ontario Companies Act.

For a small, growing town, communication is a huge asset. However, the telephone had not reached Kincardine. Since Bell was not interested in supplying rural service, the people in the surrounding townships began to organize their own company. On July 11, 1912, the Bruce Municipal Telephone Company was born. The company is now called "Bruce Telecom." On January 23, 2014, Eastlink announced they had purchased Bruce Telecom for $26.5 million.

=== Amalgamation ===
In 1998, the Village of Tiverton lost its separate incorporation, and became part of the Township of Bruce.

The Town of Kincardine, the Township of Kincardine, and the Township of Bruce were then amalgamated to form the Township of Kincardine-Bruce-Tiverton on January 1, 1999, with boundaries identical to those of the municipality that had existed in 1855. After the first election of the new municipal council, a plebiscite was conducted, and the name changed to the Municipality of Kincardine. In an interesting twist, one of the defeated options on the plebiscite was the name Penetangore.

== Media ==
- The Kincardine Record - The Kincardine area's local newspaper.
- Cable television is provided by Rogers TV, HuronTel, and Bruce Telecom
- CIYN-FM 95.5 "Shoreline Classics" - Kincardine and area's classic rock station
- CFPS-FM 97.9 "The Bruce" - local rock station broadcasting from Port Elgin, Ontario
- CKNX-FM 101.7 "The One" - local, regional and national news and adult contemporary music
- CIBU-FM 94.5 "The Bull" - local, regional and national news and classic rock music
- CKNX (AM) 920 - country music

== Bus Transportation ==
- First Student Canada (buses from Kincardine/Port Elgin, Ontario)
- Montgomery Bus Lines (buses from Wingham, Ontario)
- Ross Young Bus Lines (buses from Tiverton, Ontario) (serving the Bruce County area)
