= William Withers (disambiguation) =

William Withers (c. 1654 – 1720) was an English politician in the House of Commons (1701–1715) and Lord Mayor of London (1707–1708).

William or Bill Withers may also refer to:

- William Withers (founder) (1802–1886), co-founder of Kincardine, Ontario
- William Withers (golfer) (1864-1933), American golfer
- William A. Withers (died 1887), former mayor of Cumberland, Maryland
- William Bramwell Withers (1823–1913), Anglo-Australian historian
- Bill Withers (politician) (born 1931), Australian politician
- Bill Withers (1938–2020), American singer-songwriter and musician
- Bill Withers (snooker player), Welsh player of English billiards and snooker
