= Craigmore =

Craigmore may refer to one of the following places:

- Craigmore (hill), in the Trossachs, Scotland
- Craigmore, part of Rothesay, Isle of Bute, Scotland
- Craigmore, Nova Scotia, Canada
- Craigmore, South Australia
  - Craigmore High School
  - Craigmore Christian School
- Craigmore, Zimbabwe
- Craigmore, County Antrim, a townland of County Antrim, Northern Ireland
- Craigmore, Aghadowey, a townland in County Londonderry, Northern Ireland
- Craigmore, Maghera civil parish, a townland in County Londonderry, Northern Ireland
- Affectionate name for a twelve room mansion in Bernardsville, New Jersey that was the childhood home of billionaire Charles W. Engelhard Jr. (1917-1971).
