= Bervie, Ontario =

Bervie
- Etymology: Named after Inverbervie, Scotland
- Location in Southern Ontario
- Coordinates: 44°07′56″N 81°30′15″W
- Country: Canada
- Province: Ontario
- County: Bruce County
- Municicpality: Kincardine
- Elevation: 265 m (869 ft)
- Time zone: UTC-5 (Eastern Time Zone)
  - Summer (DST): UTC-4 (Eastern Time Zone)
- Postal code: N0G 2R0
- Area codes: 519, 226, 548

Bervie is an unincorporated place and Compact Rural Community in the municipality of Kincardine, Bruce County in southwestern Ontario, Canada. It is located on Ontario Highway 9, and is on the Penetangore River, which flows to Lake Huron at the town centre of Kincardine.

Bervie is home to several mechanical trade shops, previously including a masonry training centre for the local high school (Kincardine & District Secondary School) that closed in 2014. It is surrounded in general by agricultural land.

== History ==
The construction of the Durham road (Highway 9, Kincardine to Durham) through 1851 led to more settlements being established along its route. In 1853, a post-office named Bervie (named after Inverbervie, Kincardineshire, Scotland) was opened in geographic Kincardine Township on lot 53, concession 1, which gave its name to the locality. A tavern was opened by John McKinney at the 60th Sideroad and near-by, through his efforts, a Presbyterian church was erected. A store and a sawmill were built at the 50th Sideroad, and gradually at this point the village of Bervie developed. Early public buildings were a school-house, an Anglican church, a Methodist church and an Orange Hall. At one time Bervie had two sawmills, a planing mill and a grist mill.
