= Madison House (Kincardine, Ontario) =

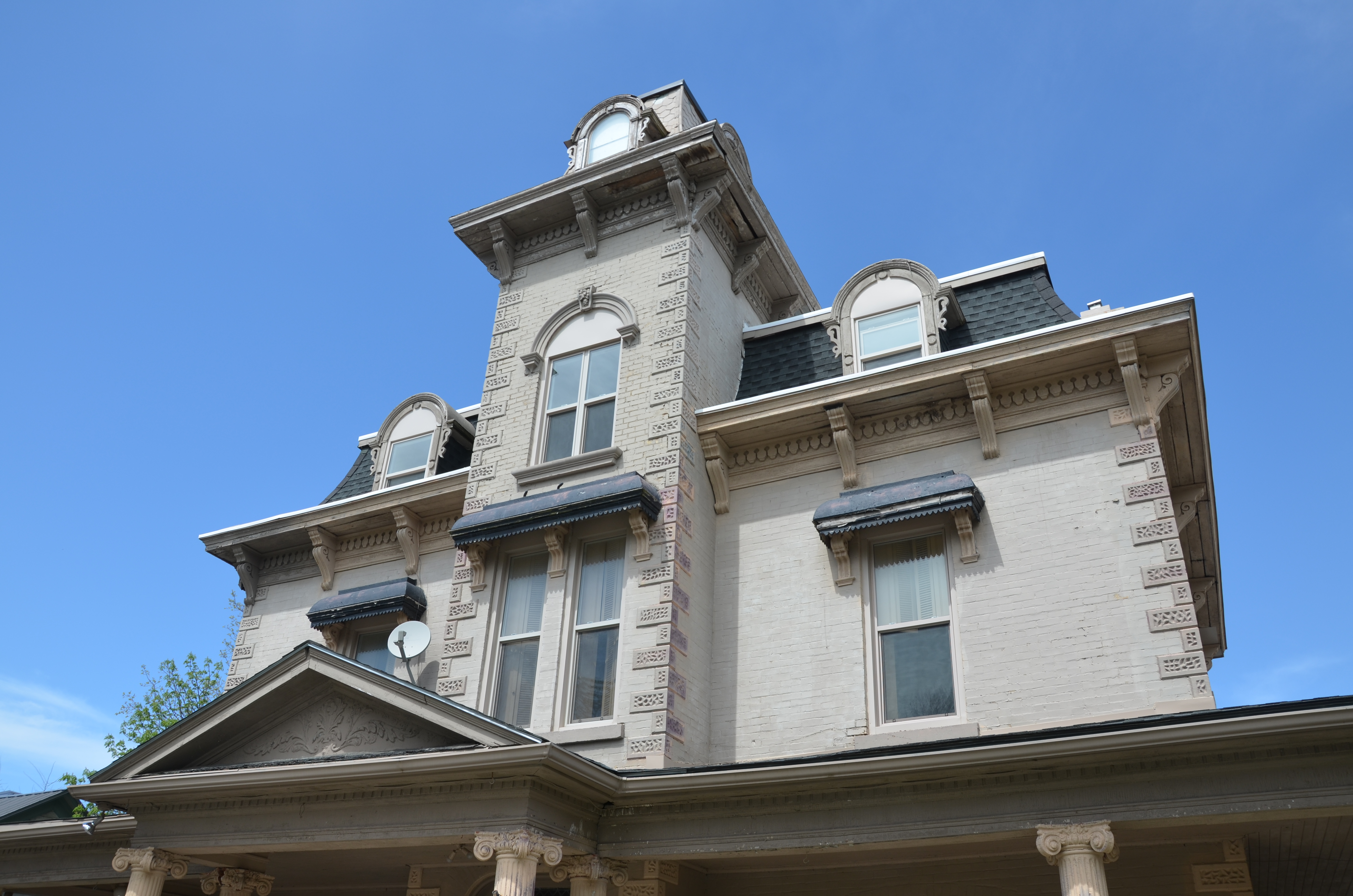
- Front of Madison House in Kincardine, ON

- Location of the house in southern Ontario
- Established: 1877
- Location: Kincardine, Ontario, Canada
- Coordinates: 44°10′39″N 81°38′16″W
- Type: Haunted House

The Madison House (or Madison's House) is a mansion located in Kincardine, Ontario.

The house, at 343 Durham Market Square, is Second Empire with elements of Italianate style, and was listed as a historic place in 1985 by the Kincardine government.

== History ==
The house is one of the oldest standing buildings in Kincardine (after Paddy Walker House). It was built in the 1870s by Thomas C. Rooklidge, and was bought in 1886 by John Gentles, a liveryman and horse dealer.

== Features ==
Built in 1877, the mansion is 9250 sq.ft. and three stories tall. The Madison House was originally constructed as a single family home but has been used for retail shops, restaurants, offices and a funeral home.

Today, the main floor consists of commercial space and the upper levels includes a 2 storey, 3 bedroom apartment and two 2 bedroom apartments.

== Haunting claims ==
There have been claims that the house is haunted, and it was featured on YTV's Ghost Trackers.
