= Madison Violet =

Canadian music duo

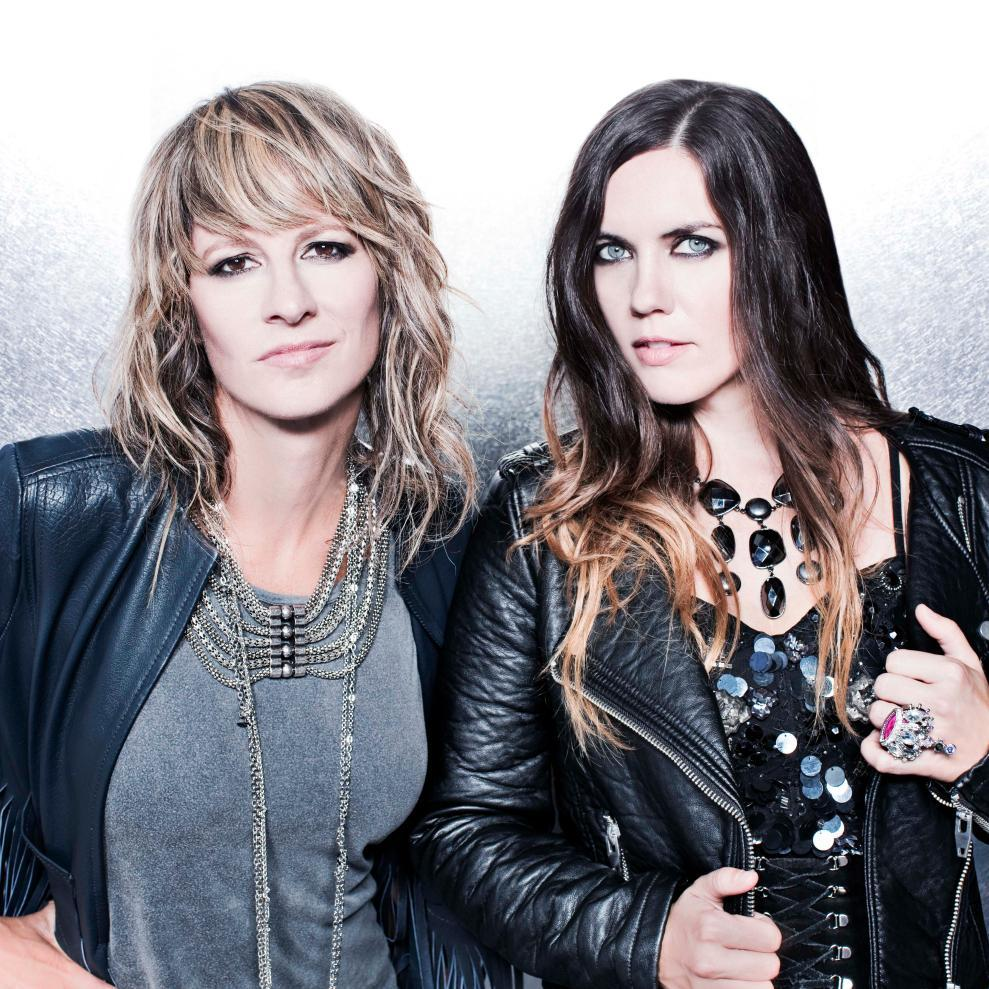

Background information
- Origin: Toronto, Ontario, Canada
- Genres: Folk, Pop
- Years active: 1999–present
- Labels: True North, Ultra Records
- Members: Brenley MacEachern; Lisa MacIsaac
- Website: madisonviolet.com

Madison Violet is a Juno-nominated Canadian music duo composed of singer-songwriters Brenley MacEachern and Lisa MacIsaac. The group has been notable for various folk and pop award nominations and wins.

== History ==
Lisa MacIsaac is a fiddler, vocalist and stepdancer originally from Creignish, Cape Breton Island. She began learning to dance at the age of seven and took up the fiddle a year later. MacIsaac plays a variety of musical styles and many instruments, including piano and mandolin. She is the sister of fiddler Ashley MacIsaac.

Brenley MacEachern, born in Montreal and raised in Kincardine, Ontario, also has Cape Breton roots. Her father is from Craigmore, Nova Scotia. Christy's Look Off in Craigmore is named after her grandmother, Christy MacEachern.

Despite both having family ties in Creignish, MacIsaac and MacEachern first met at an artists' hangout in Toronto in the late 1990s, when MacEachern was part of the band Zoebliss. MacIsaac briefly joined that band, and the pair continued collaborating as a duo after Zoebliss broke up in 1999. The duo were originally known as Madviolet, but later changed their name to Madison Violet.

They released three albums independently in Canada, and then signed a record deal with True North Records for their fourth album, No Fool for Trying, and its follow-up The Good in Goodbye. The duo have toured extensively across Canada, Europe, the UK and Australia, and in 2013 released the live concert Come As You Are: Live which was filmed at the Kulturkirche in Cologne, Germany.

In 2010, the band received a Juno nomination for Roots/Traditional album of the Year for No Fool For Trying. They were also awarded Song of the Year in the 2010 John Lennon Songwriting Contest for The Ransom, and in January 2011, Madison Violet was nominated for the 10th Annual Independent Music Awards in the Singer-Songwriter category for No Fool for Trying, and won in the category for Folk/Singer-Songwriter Song for "The Ransom and Small of My Heart".

After completing their contract with True North Records the band spent most of 2014 recording the followup to The Good in Goodbye. Experimenting with more pop, electronic and synth-based sounds the band signed a worldwide deal with Ultra Records to release the single "These Ships (Matt James Remix)" on 11 September. The new album, titled The Year of the Horse is slated for release in 2016.

In the summer of 2018, Madison Violet hired Mark Watson of Toronto-based Watson Entertainment as their music manager to further their musical career. Madison Violet also ended their relationship with booking agency Paquin Entertainment to work with Ryan Heerschap.

== Discography ==
=== Albums ===
- Mad Violet (2002)
- Worry the Jury (2004)
- Caravan (2006)
- No Fool for Trying (2009)
- The Good in Goodbye (2011)
- Come As You Are: Live (2013)
- The Year of the Horse (2016)
- Sleigh Bells in the Snow (2016 ?)
- The Knight Sessions (2017)
- Everything’s Shifting (2019)
- eleven (2022)

=== Singles ===
- "Light it Up" (2004)
- "Wake Up" (2005)
- "Crying" (2009)
- "These Ships (Matt James Remix)" (2015)
- "We Are Famous" (2017)

== Awards and nominations ==
- 2005 ECMA nomination (Best New Artist)
- 2005 ECMA nomination (Pop Recording of the Year / Worry The Jury)
- 2007 ECMA nomination (Group Recording of the Year / Caravan)
- 2008 ECMA nomination (Folk Recording of the Year / Caravan)
- 2008 Canadian Folk Music Award nomination (Best Vocal Group)
- 2009 Canadian Folk Award – (Best Vocal Group)
- 2009 John Lennon Songwriting Contest - Song of the Year & Grand Prize Winners Folk for "The Ransom"
- 2010 Juno Awards Nomination (Roots/Traditional Album of the Year)
- 2011 Independent Music Awards Folk/Singer-songwriter Song of the year for "The Random and Small of My Heart"
