= Hope Christian College =

- School Emblem

Location
- 213 Yorktown Road; Craigmore, South Australia, 5114; Australia
- Coordinates: 34°42′27.82″S 138°42′23.94″E

Information
- School type: Private, comprehensive, coeducational, joint campus primary school and secondary school
- Motto: Hope, Opportunity, Promise, Excellence
- Religious affiliation: Christian
- Established: 1980
- Principal: Michelle Eckert
- Head of school: Phil Tarrant (Deputy Principal of Senior School), Louise Basson (Deputy Principal of Primary School)
- Grades: R–12
- Enrollment: 920
- Houses: Fleming; Saint; Elliot
- Colours: Navy, teal and white
- Affiliation: Christian Community Ministries
- Website: www.hopecc.sa.edu.au

Hope Christian College (formerly Craigmore Christian School until October 2014) is Christian co-educational, independent private school in Craigmore, a northern suburb of Adelaide, South Australia in the Playford district. It teaches students from Reception to Year 12. The school now has about 920 students, with a capacity of up to 1000.

== History ==
The Craigmore Christian School was established in 1980 as an affiliation of the Craigmore Christian Church. It changed its name to Hope Christian College on 29 October 2014.

Principal George Sears served from 1981–2005. During this period, CCS was known to practise corporal punishment, and was one of the last schools in Australia to do so. Students were punished for incidents including swearing, fighting, vandalism, disrespect and cheating. The continuation of corporal punishment highlighted a loophole South Australian law, which inspired lobbying for legislation prohibiting the practice.

In October 2023, the Board of Hope Christian College entrusted ownership and control of the College to Christian Community Ministries (CCM), increasing the number of students under CCM to more than 7,500.

== Logo and motto ==
The new logo from October 2014 has a shield with four quadrants separated by a cross. The open Word of God represents the hope of the Gospel; the key represents the opportunity to open closed doors; the Southern Cross represents Australia; the mortar board represents academic excellence.

The old school motto was "Educating for Eternity" and now is "Hope Opportunity Promise Excellence" (HOPE). The old emblem comprised a rising sun (meaning a brighter future), the Word of God as an open book (relating to Christian education), Crux (Australian heritage and the cross), skeleton key (relating to teachers finding the key for each student) and mortar board (education and graduation) with the words in a banner below "Hope, Opportunity, Promise". A once-off school emblem was created in 2000 celebrating 20 years of the school and the old design was used up until 2014.

== Sport ==
There are three communities (houses) derived from the names of Christian missionaries involved in efforts known as Operation Auca; Fleming (blue), Saint (green) and Elliot (red).

== Academics ==
Curriculum includes Accelerated Christian Education (ACE) for primary and middle school students, and Vocational Educational Program (VET) for Senior Students along with the South Australian Certificate of Education (SACE). There has been involvement with various state and national competitions and initiatives such as Rostrum Voice of Youth, Tournament of Minds, Premier's Reading Challenge, Scholastic book club, and the South Australian Primary Schools Amateur Sports Association (SAPSASA) competition. The school won the Happy Little Vegemites Awards in 2000 as part of a Vegemite promotion, presented by James Blundell.

== See also ==
- List of schools in South Australia
- Craigmore (disambiguation)
