= Underwood, Bruce County, Ontario =

Coordinates: 44°18′25″N 81°29′02″W

Underwood is a village in the Municipality of Kincardine, Bruce County, Ontario, Canada, located just south of North Bruce on Highway 21.

== History ==
The hamlet of Underwood was founded in 1856, and among original industry included a shoe shop, harness shop, blacksmith shop, sawmill, grist mill, cheese factory, general store and a post office.

== Underwood today ==
With a population of less than 100, there are few stores in the community, antiques/gift shop, motorcycle shop, hunting/angling supply shop. Underwood also offers a satellite Municipal Administration Centre. Bruce Telecom, formerly Bruce Municipal Telephone System, has been in operation since 1910, offering local telephone, internet and digital cable service to the region, is located just outside Underwood.
