= Allan Cameron and William Withers =

Allan Cameron (1805–?) and William Withers (1802–1886) were the co-founders of Penetangore (Kincardine), Ontario.

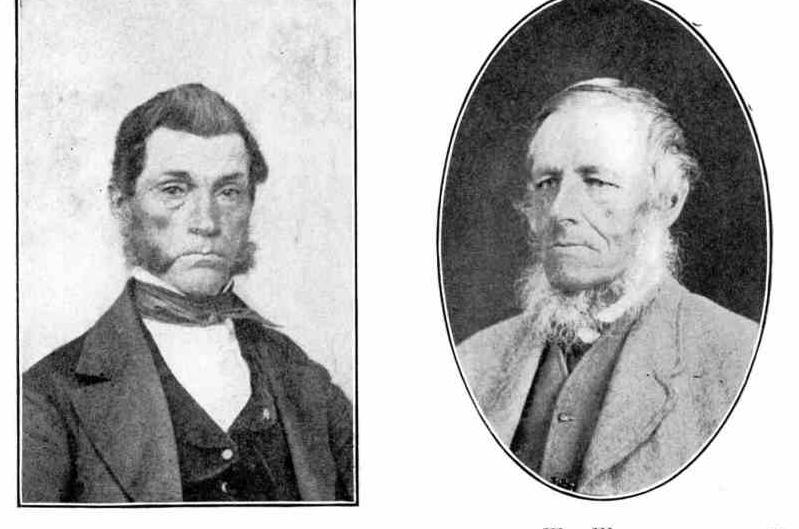
Allan Cameron and William Withers

== Allan Cameron ==
Allan Cameron was born November 16, 1805, in Cornwall, Ontario, to Scotsman Alexander Cameron and Sarah Parks. Allan was nicknamed 'black prince' due to his dark complexion.

== William Withers ==
William Withers was born September 21, 1802, in Portsmouth, England, to Ebenezer Withers and Sarah Warriker. On December 31, 1827, William Withers married Sophia Cameron, sister of Allan Cameron. On December 30, 1886, William Withers died near Portland, Oregon, USA.

== Founding a Town ==
The Brothers-in-law spent the winter of 1847/1848 in Oxford County gathering the equipment they knew necessary for a settlement in the wilderness of the Queen's Bush. Captain A. Murray MacGregor and others who plied the lake in all seasons, taking heavy catches from the fishing island to the Detroit and Buffalo markets knew that midway between Goderich and the mouth of the Saugeen River (Port Elgin), where Natives had lond traded, the waters of a stream of fair size merged with Lake Huron. This agreed with Withers and Cameron and offered promise of an ideal site for a settlement since it would provide water power, was not too far from Ashfield, Wawanosh and the northern fringe settlement in Huron and in the direct path of the anticipated northward course settlers who would flock in as soon as the land was offered.

Shortly after the breaking of the ice on the lake, Withers and Cameron headed into the Queen's Bush in the spring of 1848 [The exact date is said to have been March 5, 1848. ]. William Withers and his brother in law, Allan Cameron landed by ship ("The Fly", owned and sailed by Captain A. Murray MacGregor)on the shores of Lake Huron at the mouth of the Pentangore River. Close to the spot where they landed they built a log house, in which Allan Cameron kept hotel, William Withers built a dam and a sawmill. Cameron and Withers named this settlement Penetangore, in reference to the river. In the next couple of years more settlers saw the potential in the land that Withers and Cameron saw. By the winter of 1848/1849 seven families inhabited the settlement of Penetangore.
