= Penetangore River =

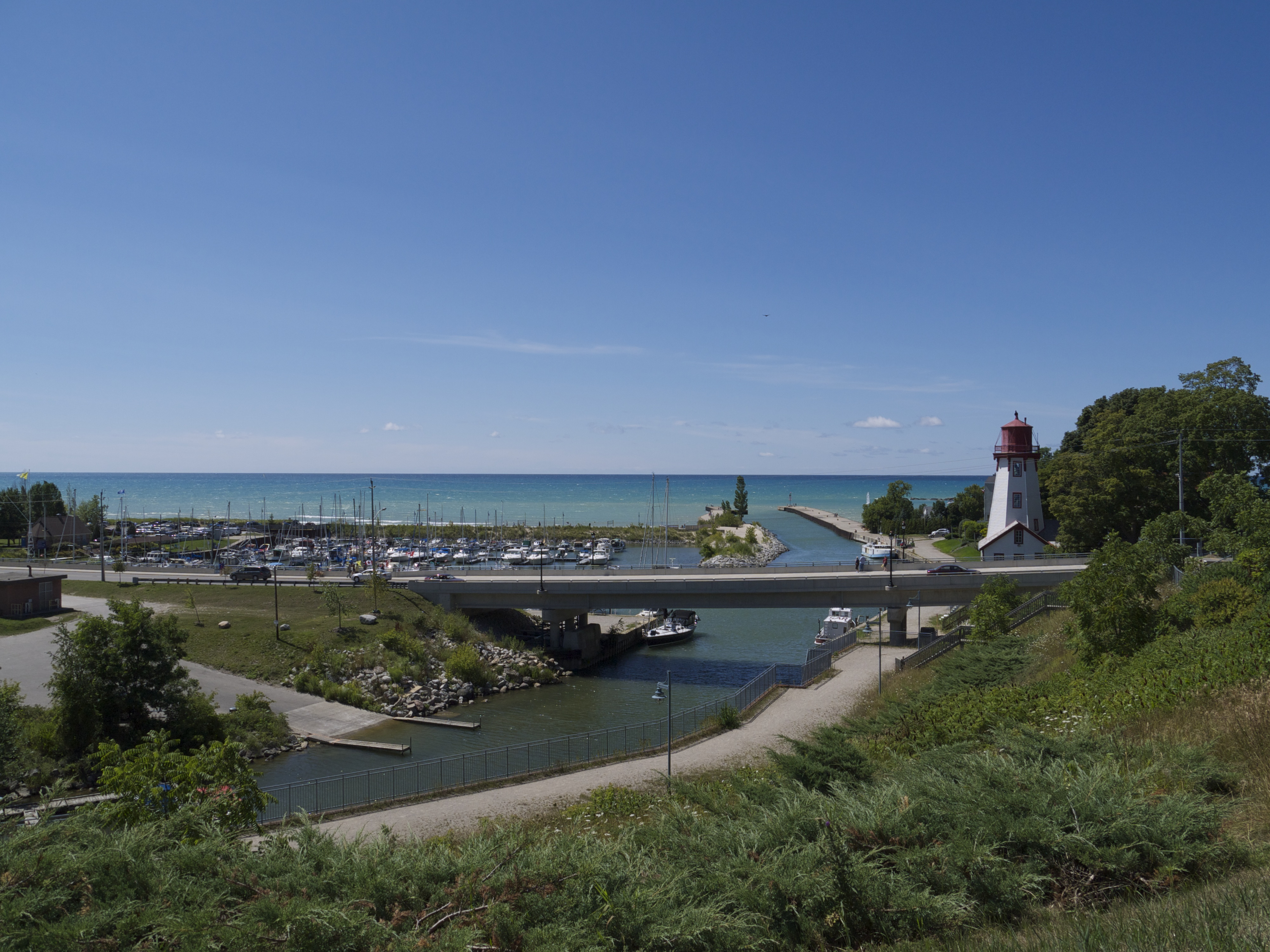
- mouth of the Penetangore River

- Location of the mouth of the river in southern Ontario
- Etymology: From an Ojibwa word meaning "river with sand on one side"

Location
- Country: Canada
- Province: Ontario
- Region: Southwestern Ontario
- County: Bruce
- Municipality: Kincardine

Physical characteristics
- Source: unnamed field
  - coordinates: 44°06′49″N 81°27′28″W
  - elevation: 285 m (935 ft)
- Mouth: Lake Huron
  - location: Kincardine harbour
  - coordinates: 44°10′37″N 81°38′18″W
  - elevation: 176 m (577 ft)

Basin features
- River system: Great Lakes Basin

The Penetangore River is a river in Kincardine, Bruce County in Southwestern Ontario, Canada. It is in the Great Lakes Basin and empties into Lake Huron. A boardwalk, a harbour, and the Kincardine lighthouse are located on the bank of this river near its mouth.

The name Penetangore is believed to come from an Ojibwa word meaning "river with sand on one side", referring to the sand bar at the river's mouth. Penetangore was also the original name of the settlement that became the town of Kincardine. The Saugeen Valley Conservation Authority has worked since the early 1970s to control erosion of steep banks within the town limit.

Every spring the river hosts an annual run of rainbow trout, as well as a few sucker species, lasting into May. In autumn, the river hosts a run of pacific salmon lasting well into October. Numbers of salmon travelling upriver, however, are particularly down from numbers anglers remember from the 1980s and 1990s, and thus anglers are strongly encouraged by the MNR to practice catch and release in an effort to increase natural reproduction.

Conservation efforts have been conducted since the early 2000s to restore the river. Important gravel spawning beds far upriver, enjoyed by the salmon and trout as recently as the 1990s, have become overgrown and many of the pools upriver once connected to prime gravel runs are now stagnant due to the reduced rapids connected to them. The Saugeen Valley Conservation Authority (SVCA) has reported that over 2002–06 the Penetangore River watershed had poor forest cover and wetland conditions and poor surface water quality. The report recommended allowing low-lying areas along the riverbanks to naturalize into wetlands and planting trees along the riverbanks and on property lines. The SVCA and the Lake Huron Fishing Club have been active in fencing off cattle and planting trees along the river, with the Penetangore Watershed Group also organizing tree-planting.

== See also ==
- List of rivers of Ontario
