= Kincardine Lighthouse =

Kincardine Lighthouse (Range rear)
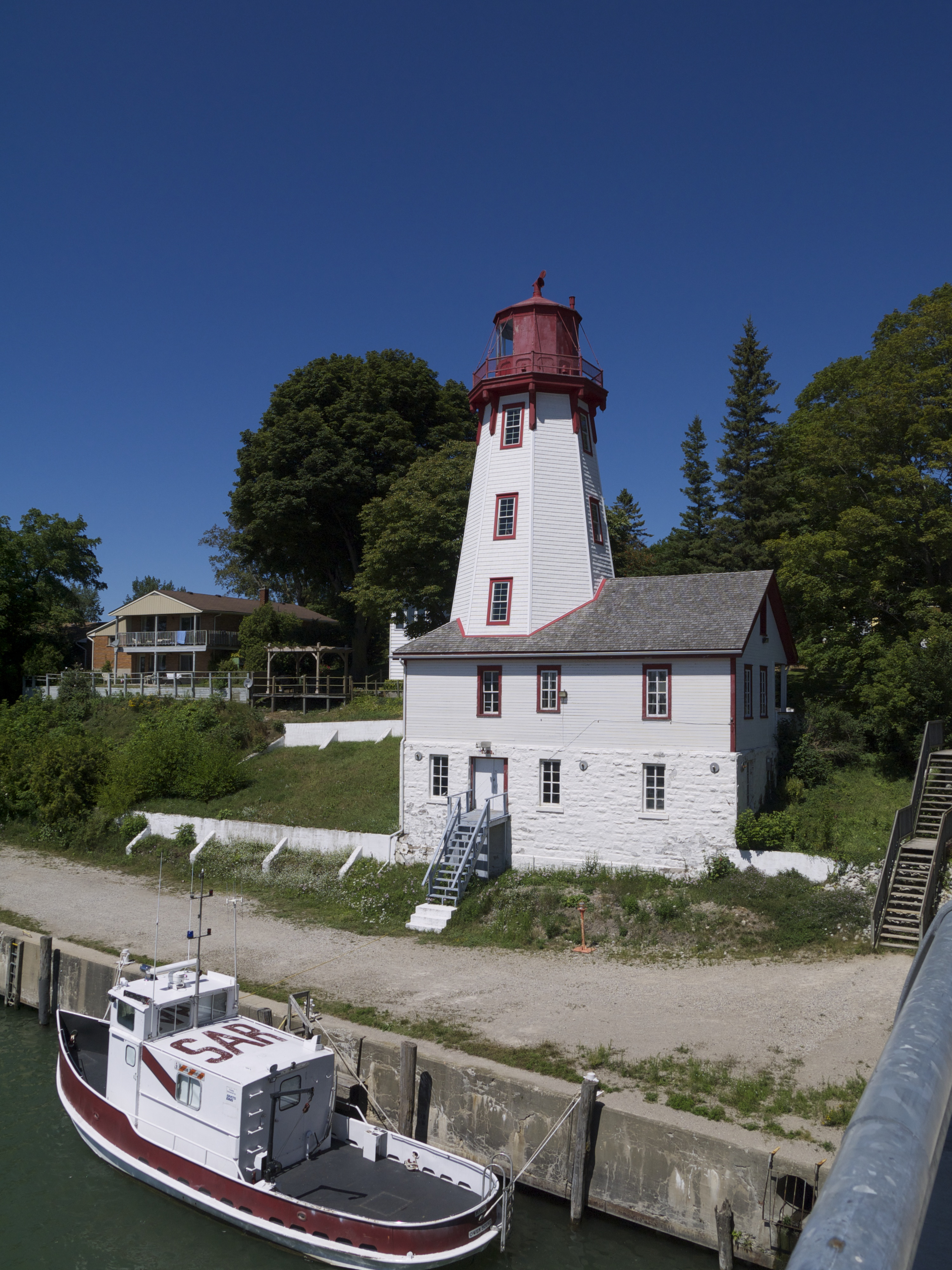
- Kincardine Lighthouse
- Location: Kincardine, Ontario.
- Coordinates: 44°10′37″N 81°38′17″W

Tower
- Foundation: stone
- Construction: stone tower
- Height: 19 metres (62 ft)
- Shape: octagonal tower with balcony and lantern rising from a two-story keeper's house
- Markings: white tower, red lantern and trim
- Operator: Kincardine Yacht Club
- Heritage: recognized federal heritage building of Canada, designated heritage property (part IV)

Light
- First lit: 1881
- Focal height: 24 metres (79 ft)
- Lens: 3rd order, bi-valve type Fresnel lens
- Range: 22 miles (35 km)
- Characteristic: Fl R 5s.

The Kincardine Lighthouse is a historic lighthouse located in Kincardine, Ontario, near the mouth of the Penetangore River. Built in 1881, it is 24.4 metres (74 feet) tall and was built above the light keeper's home. The tower is eight sided and sits on a stone foundation. The facility has been renovated and is now the Kincardine Yacht Club and a museum. It is open for tours from July 1 to Labour Day.

== History ==
The Kincardine lighthouse was built in 1881 to serve the harbour of Kincardine and its fishing and salt-shipping industries. Kincardine also had many lumber and furniture companies at the turn of the 20th century, with the Kincardine Lighthouse helping to keep the boats safe while they were coming into the harbour.

Contractor Joseph White started the project but his work was not satisfactory so he was replaced with another builder.

The tower illuminated the lake coast as well as the harbor entrance. Until 1922, the keeper was required to wind up the clockwork-like mechanism—with a system of weights and pulleys—that enabled the weights to rotate the lens.

The light was upgraded in 1910, with a fourth-order Fresnel lens. It was then modified to lighting by a kerosene lamp. In addition to winding the clockwork mechanism, the keeper was required to carry the fuel up the 69 steps in buckets, twice daily. In 1922, the light was converted to electricity, making the keeper's job less strenuous.

The first keeper after the official opening was William Kay. A number of other keepers followed but the light ceased operation in 1977 so there was no further need for staff. In 1980 the lighthouse was leased to the yacht club which opened a small museum. Guided tours were available in past years but the lighthouse is deteriorating. Repairs to the foundation were scheduled for 2013 but delayed to 2014. In June 2015 the municipality applied for federal grants to cover part of the cost of a complete restoration.

== Keepers ==
- William Robert Kay, 1874–1899
- Thomas McGaw, Jr., 1899–1913
- William G. Temple, 1913–1928
- Donald Martin, 1928–1929
- Oran Westell, 1929–1955
- Myron Hall, 1955–1956
- Alonzo Burley, 1956–1978

Earlier, before the full lighthouse was completed, Ross Robertson was the keeper of a fixed red light on the north pier; he started that job in April 1874 but died in November.

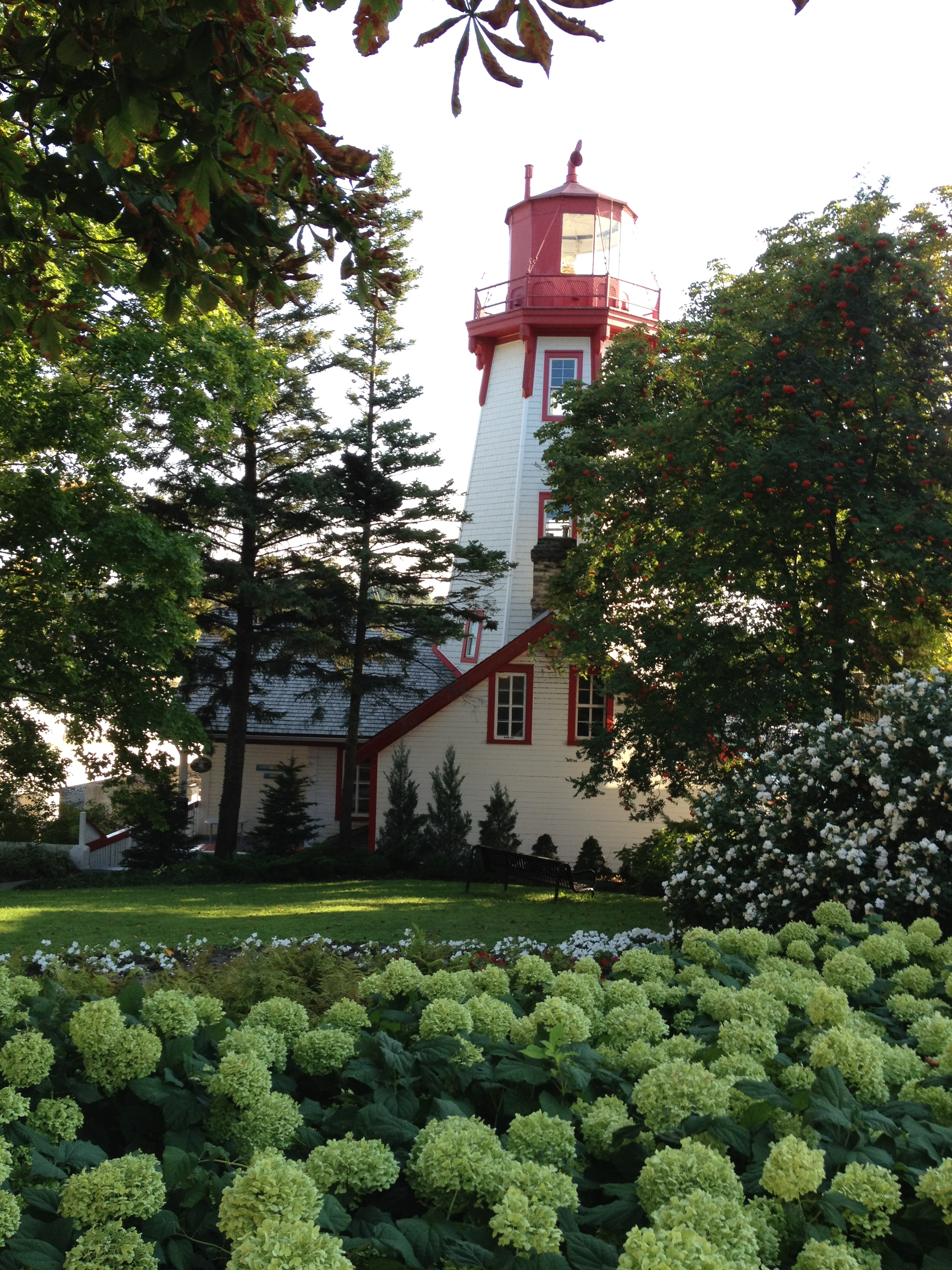

== Today ==
The Kincardine Lighthouse is now a marine museum for the Kincardine area.

== Local culture ==
The Lighthouse Blues Festival takes place near the lighthouse in July each year. The Kincardine water tower has the lighthouse painted on it, and the Kincardine Business Improvement Association features the lighthouse on its logo and is represented by the mascot Blinky the Lighthouse.

On summer evenings (July and August, excluding Saturdays) a bagpiper known as the Phantom Piper plays from the top of the lighthouse.

== See also ==
- List of lighthouses in Ontario
- List of lighthouses in Canada
