= Craigmore, Nova Scotia =

Community in Nova Scotia, Canada

Coordinates: 45°46′15.15″N 61°28′17.13″W

Craigmore in Nova Scotia

Craigmore (Scottish Gaelic: A' Chreag Mhòr) is a small community in the Canadian province of Nova Scotia, located in Inverness County on Cape Breton Island. Its name means "great rock", and was named after Craigmore, Perthshire, Scotland.
