= Kincardine, Ontario =

Kincardine
- Municipality (lower-tier)
- Municipality of Kincardine
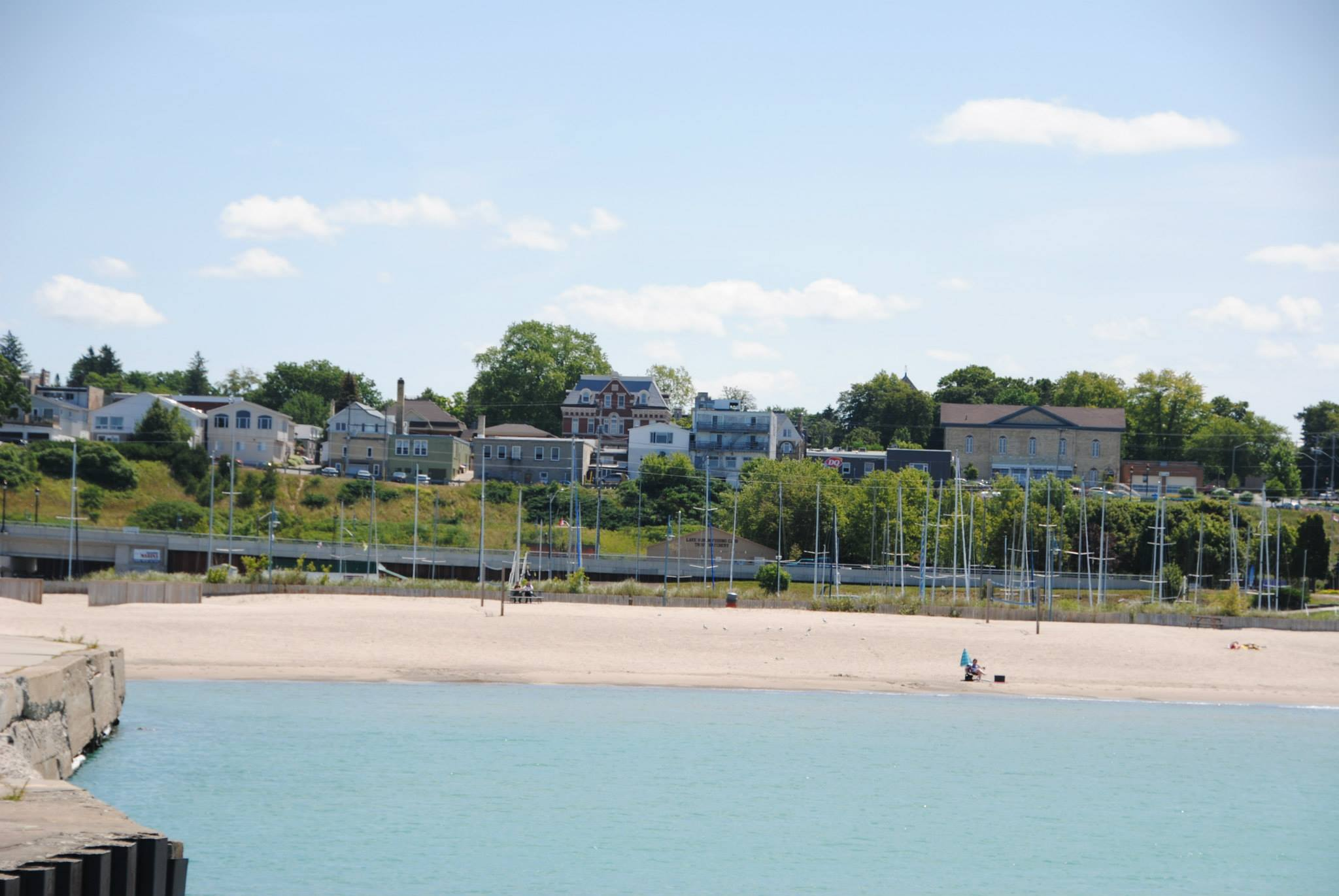
- Motto: "Great energy. Balanced life."
- Location within Bruce County Location within Southern Ontario
- Coordinates: 44°10′N 81°38′W
- Country: Canada
- Province: Ontario
- County: Bruce
- Settled: 1848
- Formed: January 1, 1999

Government
  - Mayor: Kenneth Craig
  - Fed. riding: Huron—Bruce
  - Prov. riding: Huron—Bruce

Area
  - Land: 537.80 km^{2} (207.65 sq mi)
  - Urban: 9.59 km^{2} (3.70 sq mi)

Population (2021)
  - Total: 12,268
  - Density: 22.8/km^{2} (59/sq mi)
  - Urban: 9,343
  - Urban density: 973.9/km^{2} (2,522/sq mi)
- Time zone: UTC−5 (EST)
  - Summer (DST): UTC−4 (EDT)
- Postal Code: N2Z
- Area codes: 519, 226
- Website: www.kincardine.net

Kincardine (/ˌkɪnˈkɑːrdən/ kin-KAR-dən) is a municipality located on the shores of Lake Huron in Bruce County in the province of Ontario, Canada. The current municipality was created on January 1, 1999, by the amalgamation of the Town of Kincardine, the Township of Kincardine, and the Township of Bruce.

The municipality had a population of 12,268 in the 2021 Canadian census.

== Geography ==
=== Communities ===
In addition to the main population centre of Kincardine itself (population 9,343), the municipality also contains the smaller communities of:

- Armow
- Baie du Dore
- Bervie
- Glammis
- Inverhuron
- Millarton
- North Bruce
- Tiverton
- Underwood

=== Climate ===
Kincardine has a humid continental climate (Köppen Dfb) with cold, snowy winters and warm summers.

Climate data for Kincardine, Ontario (1981−2010)
Month	Jan	Feb	Mar	Apr	May	Jun	Jul	Aug	Sep	Oct	Nov	Dec	Year
Record high °C (°F)	16.1 (61.0)	18.5 (65.3)	23.3 (73.9)	28.9 (84.0)	35.0 (95.0)	36.1 (97.0)	37.2 (99.0)	35.0 (95.0)	35.0 (95.0)	31.1 (88.0)	21.7 (71.1)	17.0 (62.6)	37.2 (99.0)
Mean daily maximum °C (°F)	−1.0 (30.2)	0.0 (32.0)	3.9 (39.0)	10.3 (50.5)	17.1 (62.8)	22.8 (73.0)	24.6 (76.3)	24.1 (75.4)	20.9 (69.6)	14.0 (57.2)	7.4 (45.3)	1.8 (35.2)	12.2 (54.0)
Daily mean °C (°F)	−4.4 (24.1)	−3.9 (25.0)	−0.3 (31.5)	5.5 (41.9)	11.9 (53.4)	17.6 (63.7)	19.8 (67.6)	19.3 (66.7)	16.0 (60.8)	10.0 (50.0)	4.2 (39.6)	−1.1 (30.0)	7.9 (46.2)
Mean daily minimum °C (°F)	−7.7 (18.1)	−7.7 (18.1)	−4.4 (24.1)	0.6 (33.1)	6.6 (43.9)	12.4 (54.3)	14.9 (58.8)	14.4 (57.9)	11.1 (52.0)	5.9 (42.6)	1.0 (33.8)	−4.0 (24.8)	3.6 (38.5)
Record low °C (°F)	−29.0 (−20.2)	−27.8 (−18.0)	−25.5 (−13.9)	−12.2 (10.0)	−3.9 (25.0)	0.0 (32.0)	3.3 (37.9)	3.9 (39.0)	−0.6 (30.9)	−6.1 (21.0)	−17.5 (0.5)	−25.0 (−13.0)	−29.0 (−20.2)
Average precipitation mm (inches)	118.6 (4.67)	79.8 (3.14)	67.9 (2.67)	62.9 (2.48)	87.4 (3.44)	69.6 (2.74)	67.8 (2.67)	71.5 (2.81)	101.3 (3.99)	88.5 (3.48)	106.7 (4.20)	110.1 (4.33)	1,031.8 (40.62)
Average rainfall mm (inches)	32.9 (1.30)	31.8 (1.25)	35.4 (1.39)	55.2 (2.17)	87.4 (3.44)	69.6 (2.74)	67.8 (2.67)	71.5 (2.81)	101.3 (3.99)	87.4 (3.44)	79.8 (3.14)	35.5 (1.40)	755.5 (29.74)
Average snowfall cm (inches)	85.6 (33.7)	48.0 (18.9)	32.4 (12.8)	7.8 (3.1)	0.0 (0.0)	0.0 (0.0)	0.0 (0.0)	0.0 (0.0)	0.0 (0.0)	1.1 (0.4)	26.9 (10.6)	74.6 (29.4)	276.4 (108.8)
Average precipitation days (≥ 0.2 mm)	20.4	16.5	13.2	13.2	13.8	11.9	11.3	10.6	13.9	16.6	19.9	18.9	180.3
Average rainy days (≥ 0.2 mm)	5.2	5.2	6.5	11.0	13.8	11.9	11.3	10.6	13.9	16.5	13.9	7.4	127.2
Average snowy days (≥ 0.2 cm)	16.4	12.7	8.1	3.2	0.0	0.0	0.0	0.0	0.0	0.38	7.5	13.4	61.6
Source: Environment Canada

== History ==
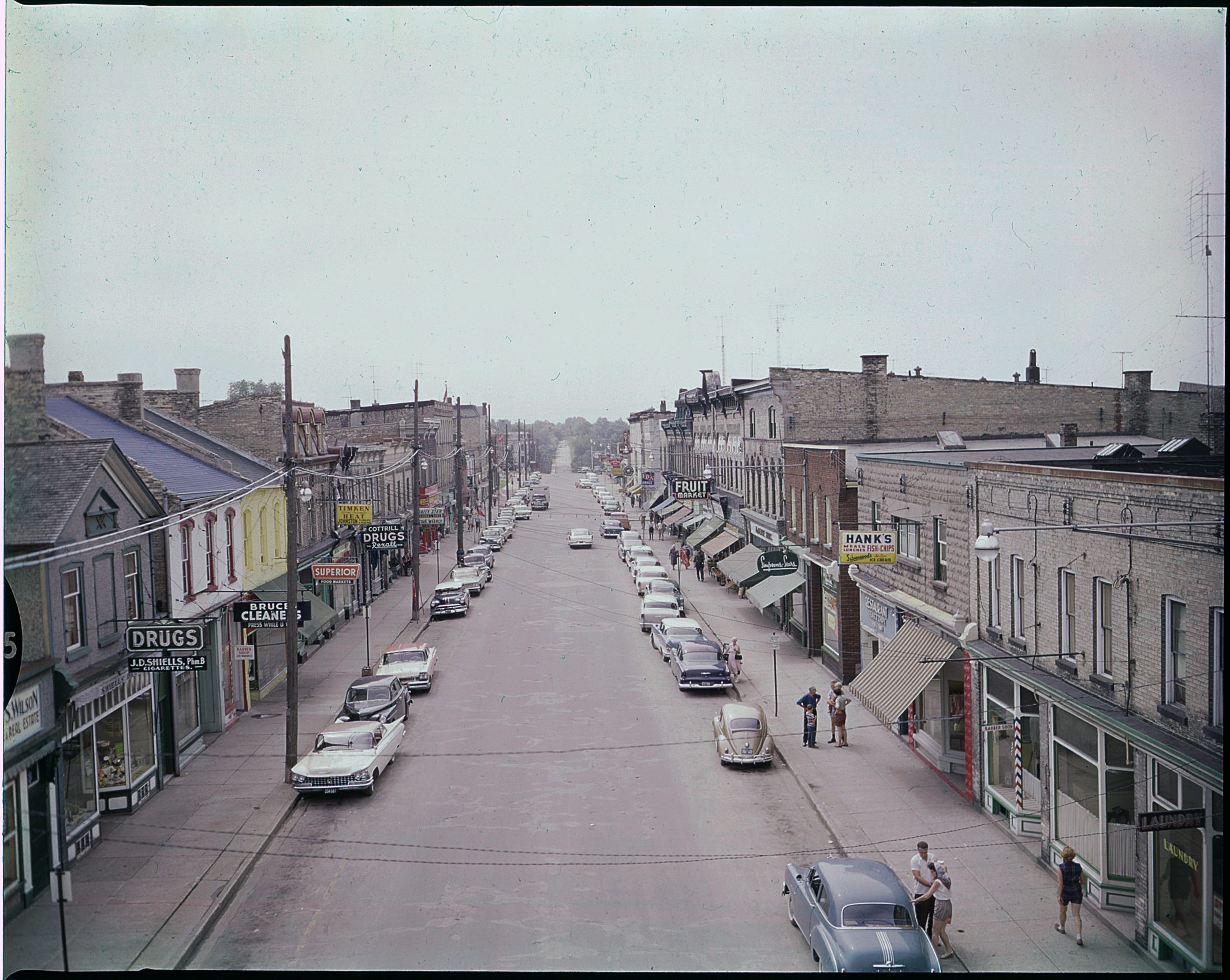
Kincardine, 1959

In 1998, the Village of Tiverton lost its separate incorporation, and became part of the Township of Bruce.

The Town of Kincardine, the Township of Kincardine, and the Township of Bruce were then amalgamated to form the Township of Kincardine-Bruce-Tiverton on January 1, 1999, with boundaries identical to those of the municipality that had existed in 1855. After the first election of the new municipal council, a plebiscite was conducted, and the name changed to the Municipality of Kincardine.

=== Historic sites ===
Kincardine has designated a number of historic sites, per the Ontario Heritage Act. These include (with local law numbers and listing dates):

- Madison House (#4641), also known as 343 Durham Market Square, designated in 1985, a Second Empire house with elements of Italianate style.
- 490 Broadway (#1988-56; August 18, 1988)
- 1558 Concession 12 (#2008-174; October 2008), stone house built in 1885
- 315 Durham Market Square (#4322; November 20, 1980), Italianate house built c.1860
- 335 Durham Market Square (#4748; July 17, 1986), mortise and tenon-jointed beamed house built in 1868
- 338 Durham Market Square (#2004-009; June 1, 2004), Victorian house with grey brick and pink mortar, with rose, shamrock and thistle pattern in windows
- (numerous more)
- 727 Queen Street (#4381; September 3, 1981), the Kincardine Library Building, built in 1908, stone and red brick, Romanesque Revival in style.
- 780 Queen Street (#4279; April 17, 1980), built in 1881
- 786 Queen Street (#4280; April 17, 1980), two-storey commercial block built in 1881
- 788 Queen Street (#4278; April 17, 1980)
- 789 Queen Street (#4667; May 16, 1985)
- 1083 Queen Street

== Demographics ==
In the 2021 Census of Population conducted by Statistics Canada, Kincardine had a population of 12,268 living in 5,160 of its 6,142 total private dwellings, a change of 7.7% from its 2016 population of 11,389. With a land area of 537.8 km^{2} (207.6 sq mi), it had a population density of 22.8/km^{2} (59.1/sq mi) in 2021.

Canada census – Kincardine community profile

	2021	2016	2011
Population	12,268 (+7.7% from 2016)	11,389 (+1.9% from 2011)	11,174 (0.0% from 2006)
Land area	537.80 km^{2} (207.65 sq mi)	537.94 km^{2} (207.70 sq mi)	538.02 km^{2} (207.73 sq mi)
Population density	22.8/km^{2} (59/sq mi)	21.2/km^{2} (55/sq mi)	20.8/km^{2} (54/sq mi)
Median age	44.4 (M: 43.2, F: 46.0)	46.5 (M: 45.9, F: 47.0)	46.9 (M: 46.4, F: 47.3)
Private dwellings	6,142 (total) 5,160 (occupied)	5,883 (total)	5,789 (total)
Median household income	$101,000	$86,363

References: 2021 2016 2011

Historical Census Data – Kincardine, ON
Year	Pop.	±%
2001	11,029	—
2006	11,173	+1.3%
2011	11,174	+0.0%
2016	11,389	+1.9%
2021	12,268	+7.7%
Source: Statistics Canada

Mother tongue (2021 census):

- English as first language: 89.3%
- French as first language: 1.4%
- English and French as first language: 0.3%
- Other as first language: 8.0%

== Economy ==
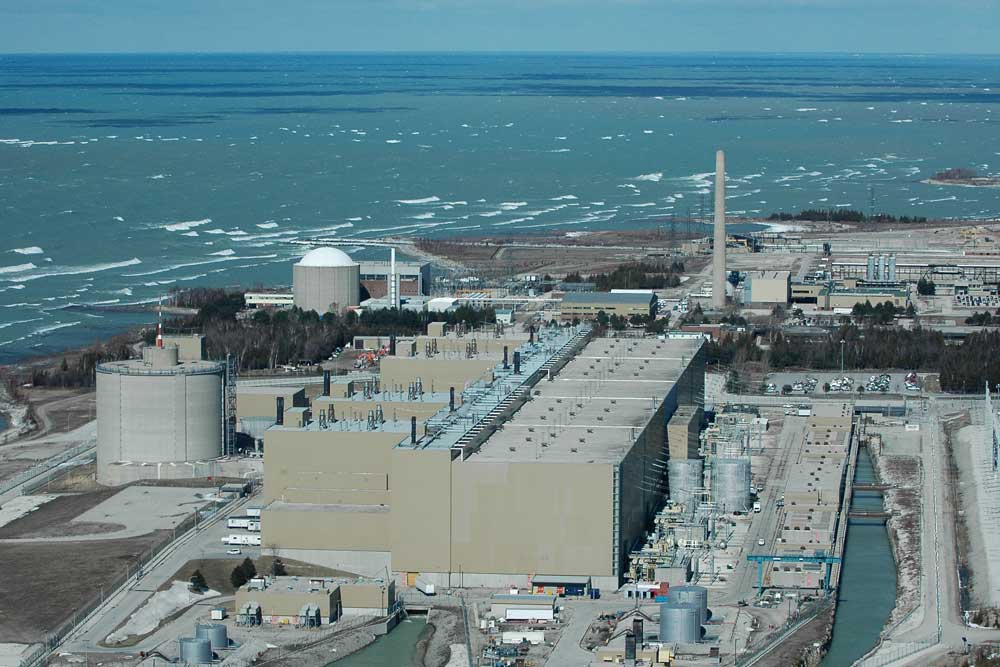
Bruce B Nuclear Generating Station

The economy of Kincardine is dominated by the Bruce Nuclear Power Development since the 1970s, which is currently operated by Bruce Power, a private company under lease from Ontario Power Generation.

Ontario Power Generation's Deep Geologic Repository for low and intermediate-level waste at the plant has been planned since 2001 and is awaiting federal approval.

Since 2016, 7ACRES has been expanding its employment numbers. It's estimated to have 300 employees by 2019.

There is also a thriving tourist industry, centred on its sandy beaches and Scottish cultural tradition.

== Government ==
=== Council ===
The municipal government is overseen by a council of nine. The council includes a mayor elected at large, a deputy mayor elected at large, two councillors elected from Ward 1 (the former Town of Kincardine), one from Ward 2 (the former Township of Kincardine), one from Ward 3 (the former Township of Bruce). Three additional councillors are elected at large.

The 2022–26 council consists of:

- Kenneth Craig, Mayor
- Andrea Clarke, Deputy Mayor
- Rory Cavanagh, Councillor At Large
- Mike Hinchberger, Councillor at Large
- Jennifer Prenger, Councillor at Large
- Beth Blackwell, Councillor Ward 1
- Stellina Williams, Councillor Ward 1
  - Stellina Williams replaced elected Councillor Ward 1, Doug Kennedy, after his passing on August 15, 2024.
- Bill Stewart, Councillor Ward 2
- Amanda Steinhoff-Gray, Councillor Ward 3

=== Municipal departments ===
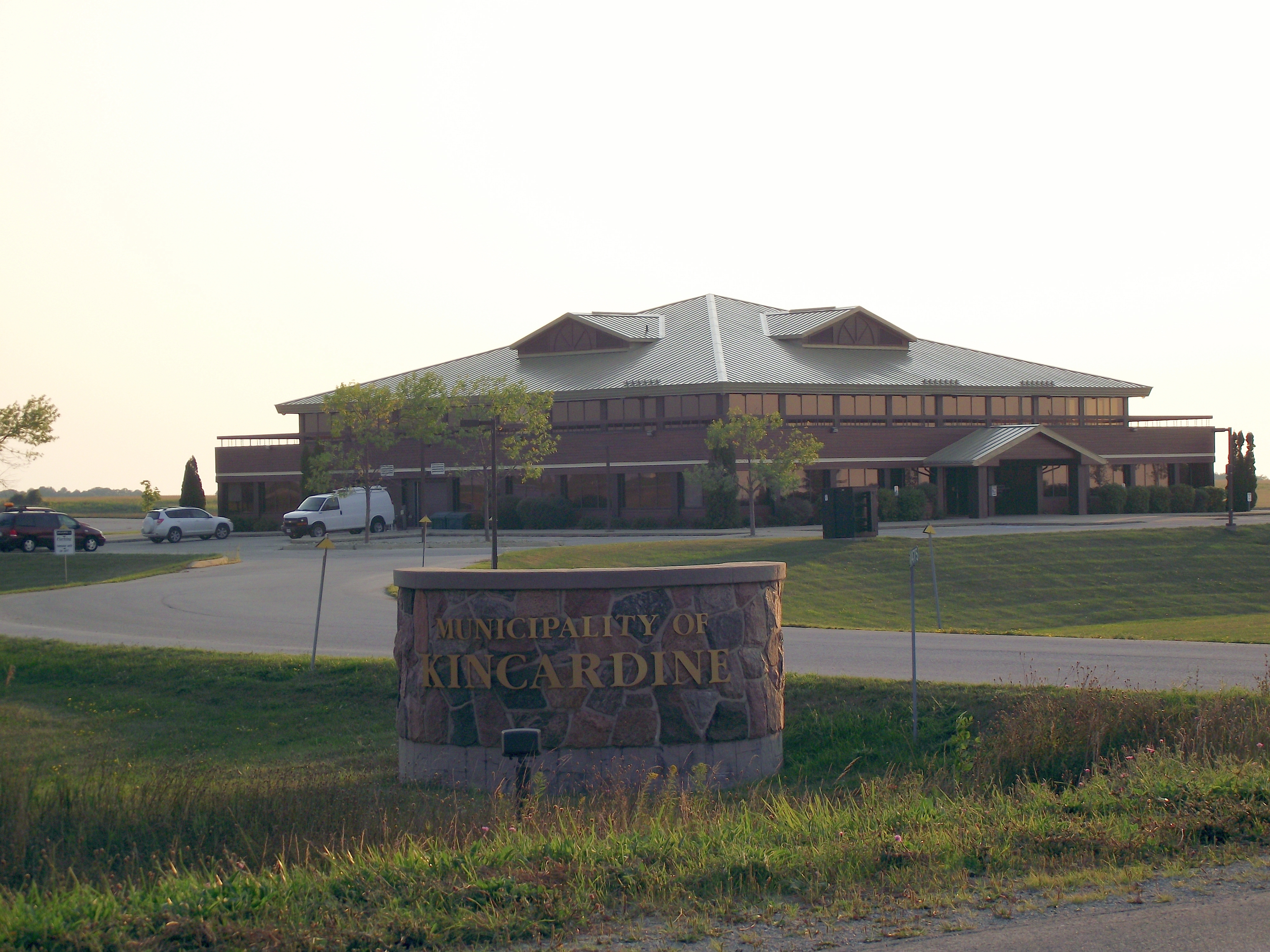
The Municipality Administration Office

- Building & Planning
- Bylaw Enforcement
- Clerks Department
- Chief Administration Office
- Emergency Management
- Fire Department
- Information Technologies
- Treasury Department
- Parks & Recreation
- Public Works
- Economic Development (Penetangore Regional Economic Development Corporation (PREDC))

== Recreation ==
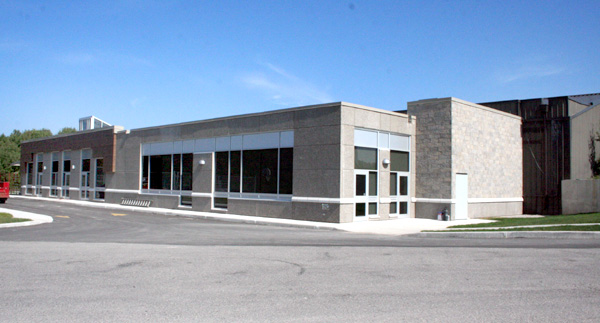

Kincardine is home to many parks and trails that run throughout the town of Kincardine.

The local community centre, The Davidson Centre is the central location for most recreation activities, as it has a park, skate park, soccer fields, track (indoor & outdoor), swimming pool, gym, basketball court and hockey rink. There is also the Tiverton Sports Arena. The original building was constructed back in 1975 and named after the Town of Kincardine's former recreation director, Keith Davidson.

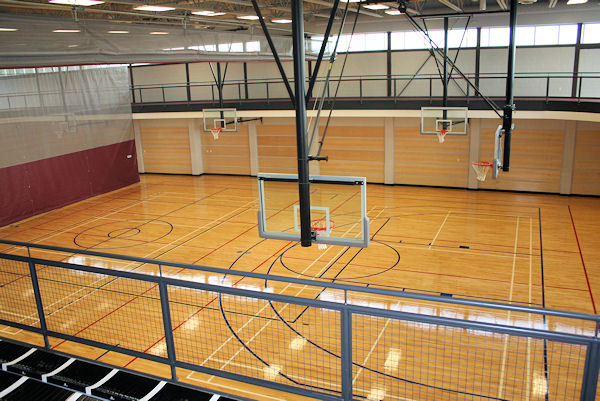
The New Gym

In late 2008, the Municipality of Kincardine approved the plans for a new addition to the Davidson Centre, which was officially opened September 2009. The new addition added on a new health club, seniors room with add joining kitchen, computer room, billiard room and 4 new bathrooms. The new addition costing $3 million includes a new gym for basketball, volleyball, indoor soccer, dodge ball and more. There are 2 curtains that can come down to divide the gym into 3 parts. Above the new gym there is an indoor running track as well as bleachers for the gym and a warm viewing area for the adjacent skating rink. The addition also includes bathrooms and new change rooms for the ice rink including the change rooms for the Kincardine Bulldogs.

=== Sports teams ===
The Kincardine Bulldogs is the local hockey team. They compete in the Western Junior C hockey league. In the 2006–2007 and the 2007–2008 seasons the Bulldogs finished 1st in the WJCHL.

All other hockey teams in town go under the name of "The Kincardine Kinucks".

== Culture and events ==
Kincardine has a strong Scottish culture. The Kincardine Scottish Pipe Band Parades happens every Saturday night during the summer months ending Labour Day weekend. Also every night in the summer (except for Saturdays) the Phantom Piper (a bag piper) plays his bagpipes on top of the light house at sunset. To continue the Scottish culture, every year Kincardine holds the Kincardine Scottish Festival & Highland Games.

Showcasing Kincardine's artistic side, Kincardine is also home to Sundown Theatre (Summer Performance Company), Bluewater Summer Playhouse (Drama Festival) and The Kincardine Summer Music Festival. Kincardine also takes part in Doors Open Kincardine showcasing Kincardine's heritage homes and buildings. Every Monday Starting on the May long weekend until the labour day weekend Kincardine has a "Market in the Square" a sort of flea market in the local park located beside the downtown.

== Attractions ==
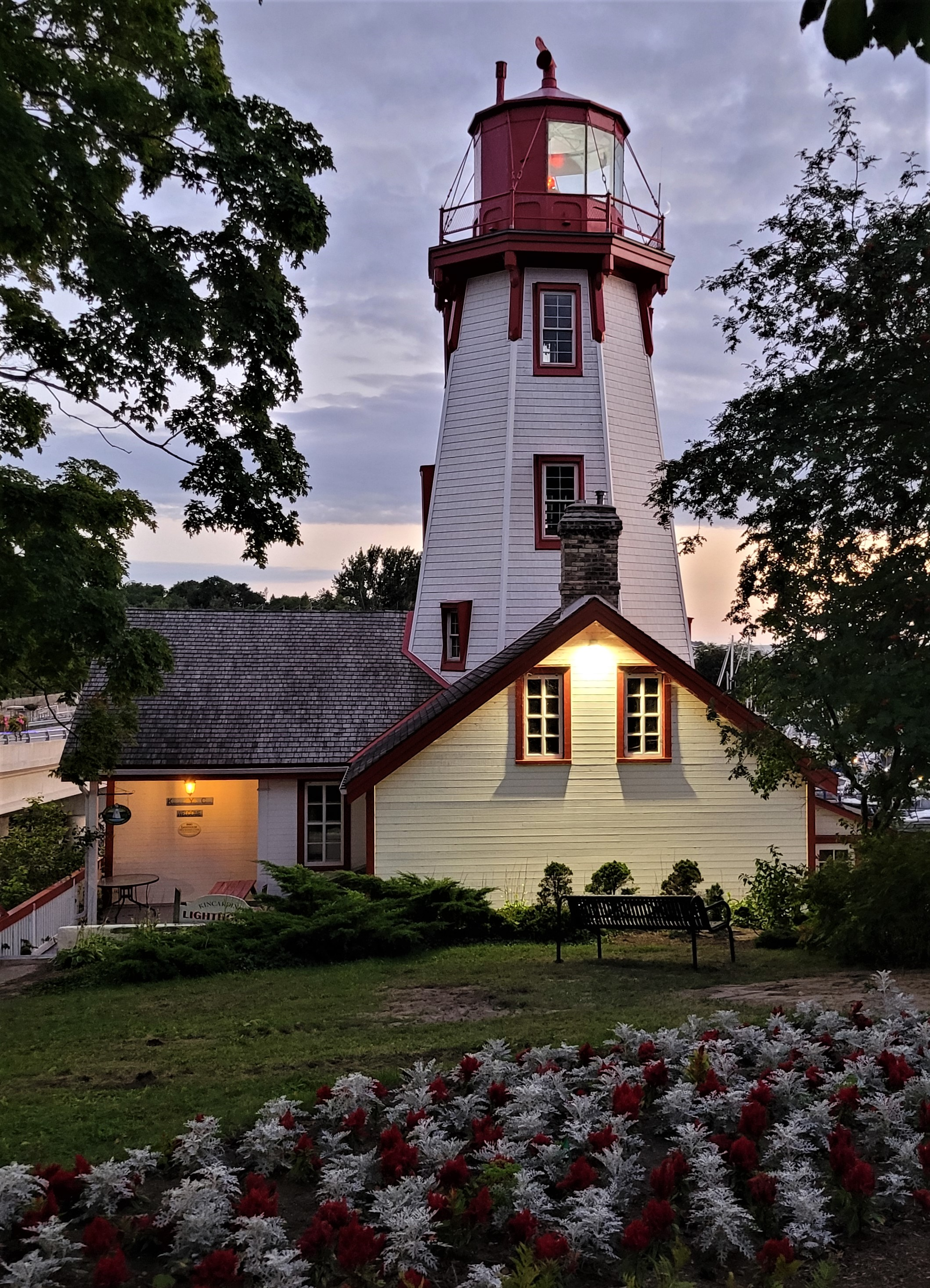
The Kincardine Lighthouse

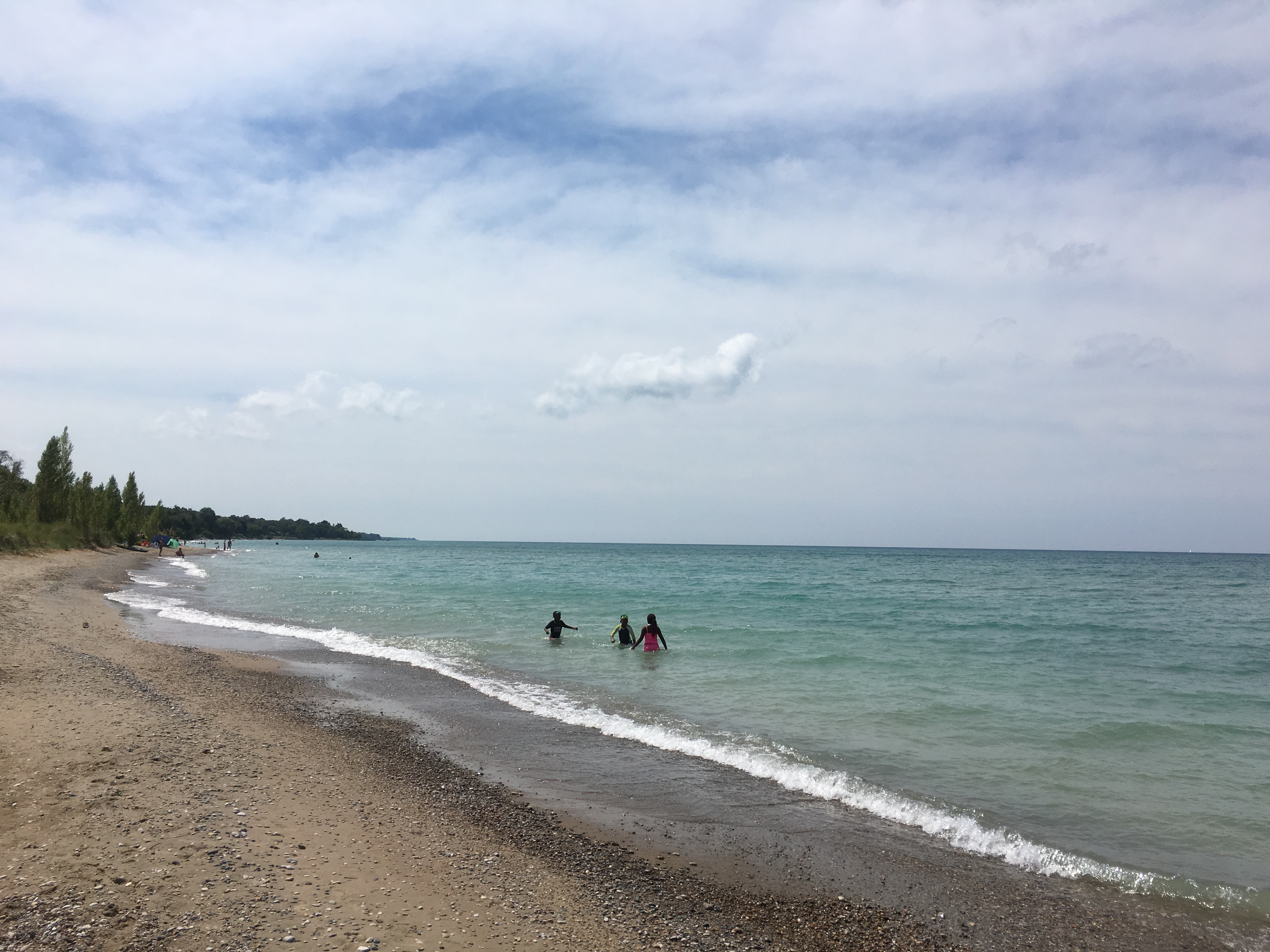
Beach in Kincardine

Kincardine Lighthouse and museum are located on Harbour Street, as well as a building constructed in 1877 which has served as a bank, a barristers and solicitors office, a newspaper office, a doctor's office, a private residence, and a restaurant. The building is architecturally significant for its intricate brick work design around the windows and parapet. Paddy Walker House, the oldest building in Kincardine, is now a museum. Beaches in Kincardine include Tiny Tot beach, Station Beach (Reunion Park), and Boiler Beach. There are two piers attached to the marina, with the South Pier used for "cliff-jump" style swimming.

== Transportation ==
Kincardine is centrally located along Highway 21 and at the west end of Highway 9. Kincardine Municipal Airport is a modern full-featured airport which can accommodate traffic ranging from light jets to rotary wing aircraft. The town also has a harbour on Lake Huron for tourists who want to travel by watercraft.

== Healthcare ==
The Kincardine and District General Hospital of the South Bruce Grey Health Centre is the hospital for the community. Further, the Kincardine Family Health Team, a Ministry of Health & Long-Term Care Initiative is located in the community offering programs and services surrounding health promotion and disease prevention. The Kincardine Family Health Team has locations in the Municipality of Kincardine and Township of Huron-Kinloss.

== Education ==
The Bluewater District School Board is the school board for the Kincardine area, and Kincardine District Secondary School is the local high school for most students. Approximately 800 students attended in the 2007/2008 year. There are five local elementary schools: Elgin Market Public School, Huron Heights Public School, St. Anthony's Catholic School, Kincardine Township-Tiverton Public School (located in Kincardine Township), and Ripley Huron Community School (located in Ripley).

== Notable people ==
- Samuel Andreyev, composer
- Paul Henderson, NHL hockey player
- Brenley MacEachern, Juno-nominated singer, member of music duo Madison Violet
- Andrew Malcolm, furniture manufacturer and MPP in the Legislative Assembly of Ontario
- James Malcolm, Member of Parliament of Canada and Minister of Trade and Commerce
- Malcolm McKenzie, Canadian politician, Liberal Member of Alberta's first Legislature 1909–1913
- Kevin Pollock, NHL referee
- Graham Ragsdale, Canadian Forces sniper
- Pat Riggin, NHL goaltender
- Jessica Stam, supermodel
- Jordan Willis, NHL goaltender
- Johnny Wilson, NHL forward
- Joel Gibb, frontman of The Hidden Cameras

== See also ==
- List of townships in Ontario
