= Paddy Walker House =

Walker House
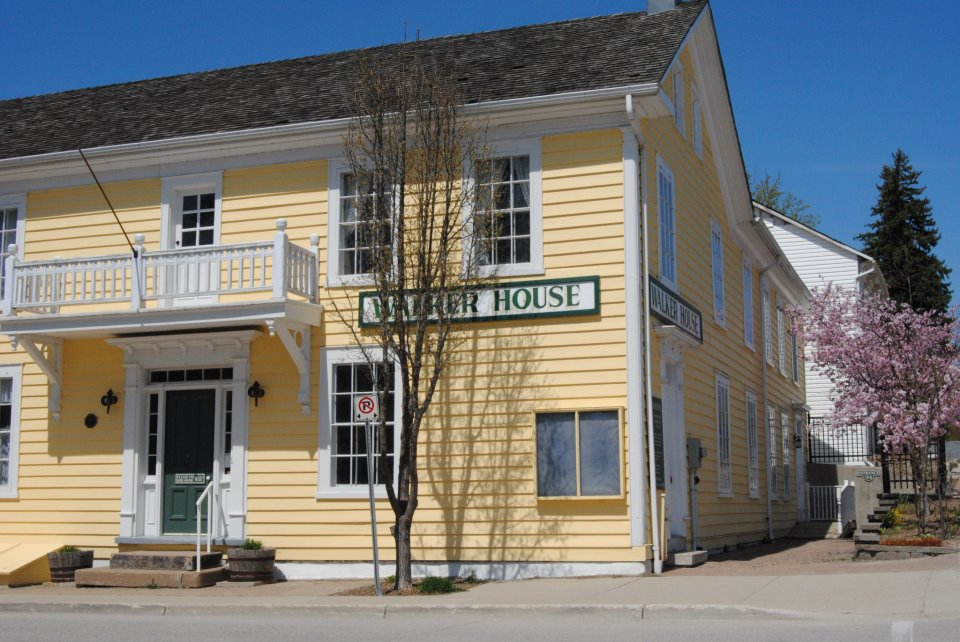

- Location of the house in southern Ontario
- Established: 2008
- Location: Kincardine, Ontario, Canada
- Coordinates: 44°10′39″N 81°38′16″W
- Type: Heritage centre
- Website: www.walkerhousekincardine.com

The Paddy Walker House (also known as the Walker House) is the town of Kincardine's oldest building and the oldest standing hotel in Bruce County, Ontario, Canada.

== History ==
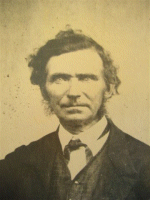
Paddy Walker

In 1850, Francis "Paddy" Walker travelled across the frozen Lake Huron from Goderich, Ontario to the 2 year old settlement of Penetangore (Kincardine, Ontario). Mr. Walker arrived in the settlement with his wife Jane and his seven sons. Realizing that when new settlers like himself arrived to Penetangore they would need somewhere to stay, Paddy Walker soon built a Hotel situated near the mouth of the Penetangore (later the Harbour).

The Walker House served as a hotel under the management of Paddy Walker and his descendants until 1942 when the Walker house was sold to Marie and Al Gairns. The Walker house was still used as a hotel under the ownership of Mr. and Mrs. Gairns until they decided to turn it into a rooming house. After the death of Mr. Gairns, Marie Gairns used the Walker House as her own private home well into the 1990s.

== Fire and revitalization ==
In January 1995, a fire broke out in the Walker House and Marie Gairns had to be rescued from the Walker House in her chair by local fireman.

The building was severely damaged and wasn't touched for three years and left to suffer from the natural elements. A rumor was spread that the Municipality of Kincardine was going to demolish the Walker house. The locals felt that that action would have too many negative results. As a result, the Paddy Walker Heritage Society was created, and the society bought the Walker House from Mrs. Gairns in 1998. Many restorations were done to the Walker House and the construction was completed in 2008 in time for the 2008 Kincardine Old Boys Reunion.

== The Walker House Today ==
The Walker House serves Kincardine and the surrounding region as a heritage centre, providing exhibits, programmes and hosting events that interpret local history.

The Walker House Heritage society is a meeting room for the Kincardine Heritage Society, as well as a local museum. It is closed during the winter months but open during the summer months as Kincardine's main industry is tourism.
